= Elizabeth Esty =

American politician (born 1959)

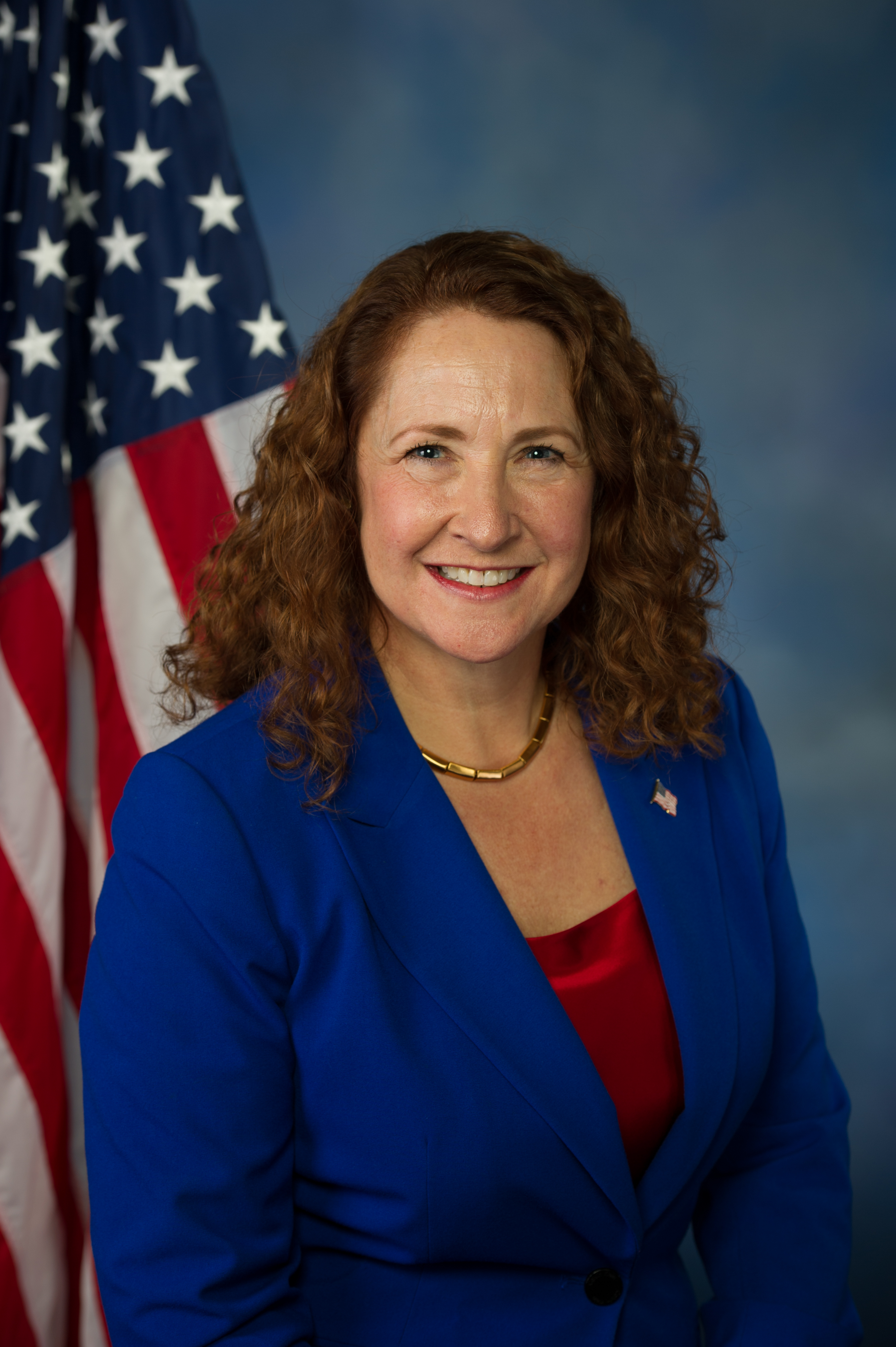

Member of the U.S. House of Representatives from Connecticut's 5th district
- In office January 3, 2013 – January 3, 2019
- Preceded by: Chris Murphy
- Succeeded by: Jahana Hayes

Member of the Connecticut House of Representatives from the 103rd district
- In office January 7, 2009 – January 5, 2011
- Preceded by: Al Adinolfi
- Succeeded by: Al Adinolfi

Personal details
- Born: Elizabeth Henderson; August 25, 1959 (age 67) Oak Park, Illinois, U.S.
- Party: Democratic
- Spouse: Daniel Esty (m. 1984)
- Children: 3
- Education: Harvard University (BA); Yale University (JD)

Elizabeth Esty (née Henderson; born August 25, 1959) is an American lawyer and politician who served as a U.S. Representative from Connecticut's 5th congressional district from 2013 to 2019. A Democrat, she previously was a member of the Connecticut House of Representatives, representing the 103rd Assembly District, which consisted of Cheshire and parts of Hamden and Wallingford. She also served two terms on the Cheshire Town Council. The 5th congressional district spans central and northwest Connecticut, including Waterbury, Danbury, New Britain, Meriden, Torrington, Litchfield County, the Farmington Valley, Newtown, and Esty's hometown of Cheshire.

Esty defeated two challengers in the August 14, 2012, Democratic primary to become the Democratic nominee in Connecticut's 5th congressional district, and on November 6, 2012, she defeated challenger Andrew Roraback, succeeding Chris Murphy, who was elected in the 2012 Senate Election. Esty defeated Mark Greenberg on November 4, 2014, in the state's most competitive district to win her first re-election. On November 8, 2016, Esty defeated Sherman First Selectman Clay Cope by a margin of 58%–42% to win re-election a second time.

In early 2018, Esty faced public criticism after news reports revealed that her former chief of staff had been accused of sexual harassment and threats of violence against staff but that she kept him on the payroll for another three months and wrote him a positive letter of reference. After initially insisting she would continue to serve, Esty announced that she would not seek reelection. She cited her failure to protect women on her staff from sexual harassment and threats of violence from her former chief of staff. Jahana Hayes succeeded Esty in Congress.

== Early life, education, and career ==
Elizabeth Henderson was born in 1959 in Oak Park, Illinois. Her father worked as an engineer in a construction company and the family moved numerous times during her childhood. She was raised in Minnesota and graduated from Winona Senior High School. She earned a Bachelor of Arts from Harvard University in 1981 and a Juris Doctor from Yale Law School in 1985. She also studied International Relations at L'Institut d'études politiques in Paris for a year on a Rotary Ambassadorial Scholarship. Esty volunteered for Planned Parenthood in college.

Esty has been a law clerk for a federal judge, a Supreme Court lawyer at Sidley Austin LLP in Washington, D.C., and professor at American University. She is a member of the Cheshire Public Library Board, Legal Advisor to the Connecticut League of Women Voters Consensus Project, chair of the board of trustees for the First Congregational Church of Cheshire, lay member of the Committee on Ministry New Haven Association of the United Church of Christ, and a member of the Parent-Teacher Association.

== Connecticut House of Representatives ==
=== Elections ===
In 2008, she challenged Republican State Representative Al Adinolfi of Connecticut's 103rd Assembly District. She defeated him 51%-49%. In 2010, Adinolfi challenged her in a rematch and defeated her 51%–49%.

=== Tenure ===
She opposed Governor Jodi Rell's proposal to eliminate the state's Office of Consumer Counsel. She cut her own pay by 10%. When aerospace manufacturer Pratt & Whitney closed its Cheshire plant in 2009, Esty was among several politicians who fought to get workers new job placements or early retirement packages. She opposes the death penalty.

=== Committee assignments ===
- Appropriations Committee
- Energy and Technology Committee
- Public Health Committee

== U.S. House of Representatives ==
=== Elections ===
==== 2012 ====
In 2012, Democratic U.S. Congressman Chris Murphy of Connecticut's 5th congressional district decided to retire in order to run for the U.S. Senate. Esty decided to run. She was endorsed by EMILY's List. She also won the newspaper endorsements from The New York Times, Hartford Courant and the Torrington Register-Citizen. She defeated Daniel Roberti and State House Speaker Chris Donovan in the primary.

In the November 6 general election, Esty defeated State Senator Andrew Roraback to become the district's next representative. Esty won despite the opposition of New York Mayor Michael Bloomberg, whose PAC channeled over a million dollars to her opponent.

Connecticut 5th Congressional District 2012
Party	Candidate	Votes	%
Democratic	Elizabeth Esty	142,201	51.62%
Republican	Andrew Roraback	133,256	48.37%
Write-In	John Pistone	12	0.00
Write-In	Russ Jaeger	10	0.00
Total votes		284,757	100.0

==== 2014 ====
In 2014, Esty defeated her Republican opponent, Mark Greenberg, earning 53.2% of the vote to Greenberg's 45.8%, despite Greenberg spending more than $1,600,000 of his own money on the campaign.

U.S. House, Connecticut District 5 General Election, 2014
Party	Candidate	Vote %	Votes
Democratic	Elizabeth Esty Incumbent	53.2%	113,564
Republican	Mark Greenberg	45.8%	97,767
Independent	John Pistone	0.9%	1,970
Total Votes			213,301
Source: Connecticut Secretary of the State

==== 2016 ====
In 2016, Esty defeated Republican Clay Cope, the First Selectman of Sherman, Connecticut, earning 58% of the vote to Cope's 42%. Esty won 27 of the district's 41 cities and towns – including seven in which Donald Trump outperformed Hillary Clinton. Esty won Cope's hometown of Sherman.

Esty received the endorsements of the Hartford Courant, Waterbury Republican-American, Danbury News-Times, Meriden Record-Journal, New Haven Register, Newtown Bee, and Lakeville Journal.

U.S. House, Connecticut District 5 General Election, 2016
Party	Candidate	Vote %	Votes
Democratic	Elizabeth Esty Incumbent	58%	179,252
Republican	Clay Cope	42%	129,801
N/A	Write-in	0%	29
Total Votes			309,082
Source: Connecticut Secretary of State

==== 2018 ====
Esty announced on April 2, 2018, that, contrary to earlier declarations, she would not seek re-election in the 2018 midterm election. She made this announcement some weeks after publication of accusations of sexual harassment against her chief of staff, Tony Baker. Esty had for a considerable time failed to examine these charges or exert any discipline but had instead approved a severance package for Baker that included $5,000 from public funds and, in addition, provided Baker with her personal recommendation for a position on the Sandy Hook Promise Council. Republicans and even Democrats, local newspapers, and bi-partisan citizens called for her resignation. She served out her term and left office on January 3, 2019.

=== Tenure ===
Esty introduced the Collinsville Renewable Energy Promotion Act in February 2013 allow the town of Canton, Connecticut, to take over two lapsed licenses from the Federal Energy Regulatory Commission (FERC) in order to refurbish two old local dams. The dams would be used to produce hydroelectric power.

In May 2013, Esty voted against repeal of the Patient Protection and Affordable Care Act. She then subsequently voted to delay the individual and business mandates in the law by one year.

Esty co-authored the STEM Education Act (H.R. 5031; 113th Congress) (H.R. 1020; 114th Congress). This bill strengthens science, technology, engineering and math (STEM) education efforts and expands the definition of STEM to include computer science. She said that "STEM education is critical to preparing our students for high-demand careers in engineering, manufacturing, and information technology." According to Esty, she frequently hears from "manufactures and small business owners that it's increasingly difficult to find workers with the right skill sets to fill the jobs in demand." The House easily approved this bill with a vote of 412-8 and it was signed into law in October 2015.

Esty also authored the Gold Star Fathers Act. This bill extends formal hiring preference for federal jobs to fathers of disabled and deceased veterans. (Previously, only Gold Star mothers were eligible for hiring preference.) Senator Ron Wyden (D-OR) introduced companion legislation in the U.S. Senate. The bill passed both chambers of Congress, and it was signed into law by Barack Obama on October 8, 2015.

Through her role on the Committee and Transportation and Infrastructure, Esty helped craft the Fixing America's Surface Transportation Act, which was passed by Congress on December 3, 2015, and signed into law by then-President Obama on December 4, 2015. Esty sponsored an amendment to ease weight limits on the weight of trucks transporting dairy products, which reduces the number of trucks needed to transport milk. That amendment was included in the final legislation. Esty also sponsored amendments to increase Buy America requirements for buses and rail cars, establish new National Electric Vehicle Charging, Hydrogen, Propane, and Natural Gas Fueling Corridors, and protect pollinator habitat and forage on transportation rights-of-way.

Esty sponsored multiple pieces of legislation designed to help cities and towns combat the opioid addiction epidemic. On March 3, 2016, she introduced the Prevent Drug Addiction Act, which calls for new consumer education campaigns on the risks of opioid addiction, strengthen training requirements for medical practitioners eligible to prescribe opioids or participate in opioid treatment programs, require opioid treatment programs to make acceptable arrangements for patients to receive needed medications on days when the program is closed for business to reduce the risk of relapse for patients in recovery, and create a new drug management program under the Medicare Part D Prescription Drug Plan to prevent high-risk Medicare beneficiaries from becoming addicted to prescription drugs. In May 2016, Esty served on the conference committee charged with crafting legislation to combat opioid addiction. Portions of Esty's Prevent Drug Addiction Act were included in the bill, including the pain management program for Medicare Part D beneficiaries. The final legislation, the Comprehensive Addiction and Recovery Act, was signed into law on July 22, 2016.

Connecticut's Fifth District includes Newtown, Connecticut, which was the site of the mass shooting at Sandy Hook Elementary School on December 14, 2012. Esty serves as a vice-chair of the House Gun Violence Prevention Task Force. She is an original cosponsor of the Public Safety and Second Amendment Rights Protection Act, which would require background checks on all commercial firearm sales. On May 29, 2014, Esty and a bipartisan group of House lawmakers introduced an amendment to increase funding to the National Instant Criminal Background Check System. The amendment passed the House by a vote of 260–145. On June 22, 2016, Esty and several Democrats held a 26-hour sit-in on the floor of the House of Representatives to protest Speaker of the House Paul Ryan's refusal to allow the House to vote on legislation related to gun violence prevention.

According to Esty's office, Esty reclaimed more than $10,000,000 in government benefits – including overdue veterans' benefits, Social Security payments, Medicare payments, and delayed tax refunds – for residents of Connecticut's Fifth District through her first two terms in office.

Esty was ranked as the 62nd most bipartisan member of the U.S. House of Representatives during the 114th United States Congress (and the most bipartisan member of the U.S. House of Representatives from Connecticut) in the Bipartisan Index created by The Lugar Center and the McCourt School of Public Policy that ranks members of the United States Congress by their degree of bipartisanship (by measuring the frequency each member's bills attract co-sponsors from the opposite party and each member's co-sponsorship of bills by members of the opposite party).

Shortly after the 115th Congress convened in January 2017, Esty was named the Vice Ranking Member of the Committee on Transportation and Infrastructure. She was also elected to the Veterans' Affairs Committee, where she served as Ranking Member of the Subcommittee on Disability Assistance and Memorial Affairs.

In partnership with Republican Rep. Barbara Comstock of Virginia, Esty introduced the Promoting Women in Entrepreneurship Act and the INSPIRE Women Act, a pair of bills designed to improve federal support for women in science, technology, math, and engineering fields. Both bills passed the House and Senate by unanimous consent and were signed into law by President Donald Trump on February 28, 2017.

=== Committee assignments ===
- Committee on Science, Space and Technology
  - Subcommittee on Research and Technology
- Committee on Transportation and Infrastructure (Vice Ranking Member)
  - Subcommittee on Highways and Transit
  - Subcommittee on Railroads, Pipelines, and Hazardous Materials
  - Subcommittee on Water Resources and Environment
- Committee on Veterans' Affairs
  - Subcommittee on Disability Assistance and Memorial Affairs (Ranking Member)

=== Caucus memberships ===
- New Democrat Coalition
- Congressional Arts Caucus
- Climate Solutions Caucus
- Problem Solvers Caucus

== Personal life ==
Elizabeth Henderson married Daniel C. Esty in 1984. Several years later, their first child, Sarah, was born while they were working in Washington, D.C. Elizabeth became a stay-at-home mother. The family moved to Connecticut in 1994 when Dan Esty started the environmental law and policy program at Yale, before accepting appointment as Commissioner of the Connecticut Department of Energy and Environmental Protection from Governor Dannel Malloy in March 2011.

After leaving office, she became involved in political reform efforts, including joining nine other former members of Congress to co-author a 2021 opinion editorial advocating reforms of Congress.

== See also ==
- Women in the United States House of Representatives

U.S. House of Representatives
Preceded by Chris Murphy	Member of the U.S. House of Representatives from Connecticut's 5th congressional district 2013–2019	Succeeded by Jahana Hayes
U.S. order of precedence (ceremonial)
Preceded by Rob Simmons as Former U.S. Representative	Order of precedence of the United States as Former U.S. Representative	Succeeded by James Shannon as Former U.S. Representative
