= Human trafficking in South America =

Human Trafficking or "trafficking in persons" is the recruiting, harboring, transporting, providing, or obtaining a person for mainly the purposes of forced labor or prostitution. Other reasons for human trafficking are the removal of organs, forced marriage, and other exploitations. South America is one of the biggest source and destination locations in the world and has struggled with the issue for many years. The ILO estimates that of the 20.9 million victims of human trafficking in 2012, 1.8 million were from Latin America. There are many factors that cause human trafficking, like a high demand for domestic servants, sex laborers, and factory workers, the existence of already established trafficking networks that often take advantage of young women and children, corruption in the governments and local law enforcement agencies, a governmental disinterest in the issue and a lack of opportunity for women in South American regions where trafficking occurs. People exploited in human trafficking are often impoverished, members of indigenous peoples, unemployed, victims of abuse, illiterate, substance users, homeless, or involved in gang activity. Research by the United States Department of State has also found that LGBTQ+ people are vulnerable to human trafficking. By far, sex trafficking is the leading type of human trafficking, making up 79 percent of all human trafficking. This is then followed by forced labor at 18 percent. About 20 percent of trafficking victims are children. Primary destinations for trafficking and illegal immigration are the United States, Spain, Britain, Italy, the Netherlands, Portugal, and Canada. Globalization, capitalism and societal attitudes facilitate and reduce the barriers to human trafficking.

== History of human trafficking in the region ==
The commercial use of humans within Latin and South America has been acknowledged since 1928 by the League of Nations. The commercial use of humans is mostly consisted of women and children. In 2000, human trafficking gain a lot of attention due to the Trafficking Victims Protection Act passed by the United States. While the act is a US policy, the act also consist of an anti-trafficking efforts that by the US to stop human trafficking in its southern neighbors. Currently, Latin America is the third largest source of trafficked humans. There is various theories as to why Central America, in particular, has seen increase cases of human trafficking. One theory is that due to the upheaval and political turmoil that occurred after the Spanish withdrew, crimes such as forced servitude and sexual exploitation increased without being checked. There it is the normalization of human exploitation that was left behind from colonialism. The acceptance of human exploitation stems from marginalization practices such as racism. The cultivation of conditions that allowed for human trafficking in Latin America can be dated back to the arrival of the first conquistadors in the 16th century.

Since the 15th century there's been a continuous pattern of exploitation and extraction of the land and people inhabiting that region. First with the Spanish, then the dictatorships that replaced, and recently along with the dictators is neoliberalism. With neoliberalism, there are outside companies paying workers close to nothing wages while over working them. Due to past civil wars, lack of government regulation, and instances of past violations against human rights, Latin and South Americans have become exceedingly distrusting of their current governments. This situation makes it ideal for human traffickers to traffic people.

== Types of human trafficking ==
=== Sex trafficking ===
Sex trafficking is the practice of kidnapping people, typically young women and children, to be forced into the practice of sexual slavery and prostitution. Sex trafficking is the most common form of human trafficking. According to a report by the UNODC, 79 percent of trafficking is for sex trafficking. Typically, people with histories of sexual assault or sexual violence and people who live in poverty are targeted and kidnapped. According to State Department officials, it is estimated that tens of thousands of Latin American women are trafficked each year, typically internationally. A large number of these victims come from Colombia or the Dominican Republic. According to a report made by the United Nations in 2016, multiple gangs, crime families, and drug trafficking organizations deal in human trafficking which may involve some 480,500 victims. These women and usually children are trafficked into prostitution, but can also be forced to work in pornography or stripping. Argentina and Brazil are very common destination countries for women from the Andes and some places in the Caribbean, like the Dominican Republic and Panama is a destination country for women from Colombia and Central America who are forced to work in the sex trade. Trafficking is a common occurrence along borders in Central and South America. The Mexican-Guatemalan border is especially popular due to undocumented migrants en route to the United States are often pushed into prostitution.

=== Forced labor ===
Forced labor is the practice of intimidating a person into performing types of labor, through intimidation or violence. The ILO reported that in 2012, about 1.8 million people in Latin America were laborers in forced labor. These numbers included victims of human trafficking. These numbers are estimated to be roughly 3.1 percent of the regions population, though it does not count the victims of human trafficking who are sent out internationally. Typically, men are approached by people looking for workers in urban areas where poverty and unemployment are common. From the 2014 UNODC report males make up anywhere from 67 to 70 percent of the trafficked victims for forced labor. These people promise good pay for work and often transport the workers to ranches and mines in remote areas. This is a common practice or occurrence in place like Peru, Brazil, Bolivia, and Paraguay where people are often forced to work on cattle ranches, lumber mills, cole mines and plantations where soy beans, cotton and corn are produced. Upon reaching their destination, the workers are told they are now in debt, and held in debt bondage. They are told that transportation costs will be taken out of their salaries. Other times, the workers aren't brought to the work site, but to a drop off point, where they sometimes wait for days or weeks for employers to come pick them up. Food, lodging and transportation are taken out of their salary, and they are held until their debt is paid. The indigenous people of Latin America are also highly susceptible to being taken into forced labor. Typically, they live in poverty and with discrimination and a low literacy rate working against them, they have no real way to protest against the laborers effectively. It is estimated that annually, about 1.5 million seasonal farm workers who are mostly from Latin America and the Caribbean Islands harvest produce in the United States. There have been an increasing amount of abuses due to forced labor because of the low wages, harsh working conditions, lack of legal protection and an increasing demand for cheap labor.

=== Trafficking of children ===
Typically, children are trafficked in countries that have large tourist attractions and centers on sex tourism. Street and orphaned children are the most vulnerable to be taken advantage of by traffickers, though there have been cases where the trafficked children still live with their family, and participate in commercial sexual activities to provide for the family. Some other factors that make a child vulnerable to becoming a victim of trafficking are poverty, infrequent attendance of school, involvement in criminal activity, drug or alcohol addiction, or physical or sexual abuse. Children are typically trafficked for the uses of illegal adoptions, child soldiers, sex slavey, or to work for an organized crime group. State Department officials estimate that roughly 1 million children work as domestic servants in Latin America and that 70 to 80 percent of unaccompanied children travel with smugglers. The UNODC noted that children made up 30 percent of the trafficked victims in the Americas.

== Structural factors that contribute to human trafficking ==
=== Links to organized crime ===
People are often trafficked by criminal organizations such as criminal gangs or mafia groups. Typically, organized crime groups take part in the sex trade and trafficking practice. In Guatemala, organized crime groups kidnap and transport women from other countries, often other Latin American countries, to participate in prostitution and sexual slavery. According to the Bilateral Safety Corridor Coalition, organized crime groups from Russia, Japan, Mexico, Central America, Ukraine and multiple other countries have been caught attempting to traffic people across the U.S.-Mexico border. The State Department states that there is evidence of children being forced to commit crimes in Ecuador, Chile, and Brazil.

=== Supply and demand of capitalism ===
Human trafficking is unique in that the supply and demand are the same thing. The high demand for human bodies incentivizes the exploitation and dehumanization of human beings. In a SAGA publication there is an approximation of 32 billion dollars the human trafficking industry generates annually. Supply and demand of human trafficking is normalized in capitalist societies where consumers feel it is their right to receive the services they paid for. Giving a monetary value to humans, makes those selling them see them as object and their property.

Due to the supply and demand of humans, the final destination for trafficked humans correlates with tourism. Tourism and sexual exploitation are positively correlated in modern day cities in Latin America.

=== Stigma and societal attitudes ===
Additional factors that perpetuates human trafficking, forced labor, and forced prostitution are stigmas and attitudes a society has in regard to individuals in the human trafficking industry. Research done by Jo Bindman, claims in general sex workers face significantly higher discrimination by law enforcements, governmental authority and society. This presents an issue concerning human trafficking as those who are unwilling forced into sex work are at a disadvantage of receiving help due to the conversation around sex work.

=== Systemic inequality ===
Due to inequality and disparities that result from globalization and the lack of regulation, there are certain groups who are more vulnerable than others of becoming victims of human trafficking. These groups include and is not limited to individual who are impoverished, lack job opportunities, queer, and/or engage in harmful cultural traditions. Those who are living in poverty and lack the opportunity to at acquire a safe, honorable job are easily susceptible to the deceiving, manipulative tactics of human traffickers. In their desperation, people find themselves in the human trafficking system.

=== Illegal immigration ===
Some people go to traffickers looking to be brought into a new country, typically illegally. The most common countries people are brought to are The United States, Britain, Italy, Canada, Spain and the Netherlands. These countries have come to rely on migrant workers doing jobs in agriculture, construction, manufacturing and domestic service for low paying wages. Because of a concern about job competition, security and many other issues related to taking in large amounts of foreign-born populations, this has caused many of these countries to strengthen and tighten their border security. Though this has only caused a rise in illegal immigration. Many people from Guatemala and Belize travel through Mexico to get to the United States border. Because of the increasing security along the borders, smugglers will take more dangerous routes, which makes the smuggling more costly. To pay for this, smugglers will force the migrants into forced labor or prostitution. According to Zdrojewski, many of the trafficked women and children in Central America originate from Nicaragua, Dominica Republic and Guatemala. Most immigration is from the south to the north, to the United States.

== Efforts to combat human trafficking ==
Human Trafficking is underreported making for there to be a substantial amount of data missing concerning human trafficking. The two reasoning behind this is one the inadequate legislation surrounding and lacking of testimonies from victims and witness. Most of the underrepresented types of human trafficking fall in categories of forced labor, domestic servitude, forced marriage, organ harvesting and children trafficking. In 2000, the Protocol to Prevent, Suppress, and Punish Trafficking in Persons, Especially Women and Children, also known as the Trafficking Protocol, supplements the United Nations convention against transnational organized crime. Its intended person is to prevent and fight against human trafficking by facilitating international corporation. Since the creation of the protocol more countries are implementing laws in effort to prevent further human trafficking. Human Trafficking in Latin America did not become a central issue until the late twentieth century and the beginning of the twenty-first century, after the U.S. Trafficking Victims Protection Act and the Trafficking Protocol from the United Nations. The TVPA has provided funding to support local efforts against trafficking.

Socially, there is an increase awareness about the issue and how to best support the victims. There are programs training individuals to recognize and care for human trafficked victims. However, many Latin American countries find it make progress against trafficking because they lack the resources and political power to enforce existing programs. Much of their resources and time goes into other issues such as drug trafficking and gang violence. Many countries even lack shelters for trafficked victims and follow up plans after the victim is freed.
