= PCIP =

PCIP may refer to:

- Protecting Children from Internet Pornographers Act of 2011, a proposed U.S. Internet legislation
- Nuclear receptor coactivator 3, one symbol for which is pCIP
