= Human trafficking in Michigan =

Human trafficking in Michigan includes trafficking and exploitation of illegal immigrants, kidnapping, and forced prostitution. As a result, laws were created to provide proper litigation of related cases, and large universities have also taken interest in combating this particular crime and bringing aid to the victims. The National Human Trafficking Resource Center reported receiving 717 emails and calls in the year 2015 about human trafficking in Michigan.

== Law ==
In 2006, Governor Jennifer Granholm signed House Bill 5747, introduced by Rep. Phil Pavlov, which specifically outlawed human trafficking in Michigan. The relevant state statutes are sections 750.462a to 750.462i. Effective April 1, 2011, an additional statute, 750.462j was enacted, which set grounds for further prosecution in human trafficking cases.

== Universities ==
There are several organizations and services providing research of human trafficking in the US, including the University of Michigan and Michigan State University.

=== Michigan State University ===
Jane White, the Director of the Michigan Human Trafficking Task Force at the School of Criminal Justice of Michigan State University, is the founder of the task force that has over ninety member agencies. Their mission statement is:

The Michigan Human Trafficking Task Force exists to facilitate a collaborative effort to prevent trafficking of persons within the State of Michigan, to pursue prosecution of perpetrators, and to protect and rehabilitate trafficking victims.

This task force provides awareness through speaking engagements and specialized training to professional groups and statewide conferences, initiates regional task forces, supports prosecution both at state-level and federal cases, and identifies resources for victims/survivors of both labor and sexual trafficking.

=== University of Michigan ===
The University of Michigan provides the "Human Trafficking Clinical Program". It consists of two sections, the Human Trafficking Clinic (HTC), and the Human Trafficking Law Project (HTLP). "The HTC is the first legal clinic solely dedicated to human trafficking in the United States." The HTLP is a database being constructed of all Human Trafficking litigation in the United States.

== Examples ==
Several stories and cases can be found via the University of Michigan website. Cases of truck stops being used in prostitution rings are also in the database of the University of Michigan's HTLP.

Henry Davis was sentenced to serve 40 years in prison after the police discovered a ring of forced prostitution. The women, including some as young as thirteen, had been kidnapped and imprisoned in a house in Detroit. They were forced to have sex with male visitors, strip at private parties, and sell jewelry at a strip mall. They were escorted everywhere, including the bathroom, and were beaten when they stepped out of line. The ring was discovered when one young woman, who had been kidnapped while waiting for a bus, escaped when she was taken to the mall to have her hair done and to sell jewelry. She then lead the police to the house where she had been imprisoned, leading to Davis' arrest.

Purpose Point Harvesting LLC, a Michigan farm labor contractor, was found liable in 2025 after an eight-day jury trial in the United States District Court for the Western District of Michigan. Five Guatemalan workers employed under the H-2A visa program alleged they paid illegal recruitment fees, had their passports confiscated, worked extremely long hours—sometimes up to 100 hours per week—but were only paid for fewer hours, and lived in inadequate housing. The jury held the company violated the Victims of Trafficking and Violence Protection Act of 2000 and the Fair Labor Standards Act. They awarded more than US $500,000 in total damages, including $450,000 in punitive damages. The case is a rare successful labor-trafficking verdict under H-2A visa abuse and is seen as an important precedent for migrant agricultural workers in Michigan.

== See also ==
- Human trafficking in California
- Human trafficking in Texas
