= Connecticut's 103rd House of Representatives district =

American legislative district

Connecticut's 103rd State House of Representatives district
Representative
Liz Linehan; D

Connecticut's 103rd House of Representatives district elects one member of the Connecticut House of Representatives. It encompasses parts of Cheshire, Hamden, and Wallingford. It has been represented by Democrat Liz Linehan since 2017.

== List of representatives ==
List of Representatives from Connecticut's 103rd State House District
Representative	Party	Years	District home	Note
Vincent Gagliardi	Democratic	1967–1973	East Haven	Seat created
Myron E. Yudkin	Republican	1973–1975	Woodbridge	
John P. Sponheimer	Democratic	1975–1981	Derby	
Peter M. Lerner	Republican	1981–1993	Woodbridge	
Lucien DiMeo	Republican	1993–1997	Hamden	
Craig Henrici	Democratic	1997–1999	Hamden	
Al Adinolfi	Republican	1999–2001	Cheshire	
Brendan Sharkey	Democratic	2001–2003	Hamden	
Al Adinolfi	Republican	2003–2009	Cheshire	
Elizabeth Esty	Democratic	2009–2011	Cheshire	
Al Adinolfi	Republican	2011–2017	Cheshire	
Liz Linehan	Democratic	2017–	Cheshire	

== Recent elections ==
=== 2020 ===
2020 Connecticut State House of Representatives election, District 103
Party	Candidate	Votes	%
Democratic	Liz Linehan (incumbent)	6,355	50.48
Republican	Pam Salamone	5,957	47.32
Independent Party	Pam Salamone	278	2.21
Total votes		12,590	100.00
Democratic hold			

=== 2018 ===
2018 Connecticut House of Representatives election, District 103
Party	Candidate	Votes	%
Democratic	Liz Linehan (Incumbent)	5,188	51.6
Republican	Diane Pagano	4,873	48.4
Total votes		10,061	100.00
Democratic hold			

=== 2016 ===
2016 Connecticut House of Representatives election, District 103
Party	Candidate	Votes	%
Democratic	Liz Linehan	5,637	50.38
Republican	Andrew Falvey	5,552	49.62
Total votes		11,189	100.00
Democratic gain from Republican			

=== 2014 ===
2014 Connecticut House of Representatives election, District 103
Party	Candidate	Votes	%
Republican	Al Adinolfi	4,348	52.9
Democratic	Kristen Selleck	3,554	43.3
Independent Party	Al Adinolfi (Incumbent)	313	3.8
Total votes		8,215	100.00
Republican hold			

=== 2012 ===
2012 Connecticut House of Representatives election, District 103
Party	Candidate	Votes	%
Republican	Al Adinolfi (Incumbent)	5,800	56.2
Democratic	Liz Linehan	4,514	43.8
Total votes		10,314	100.00
Republican hold			
