= Al Adinolfi =

American politician (1934–2019)

Member of the Connecticut House of Representatives from the 103rd district
- In office January 7, 2011 – January 9, 2017
- Preceded by: Elizabeth Esty
- Succeeded by: Liz Linehan
- In office January 8, 2003 – January 3, 2009
- Preceded by: Brendan Sharkey
- Succeeded by: Elizabeth Esty
- In office January 1999 – January 2001
- Preceded by: Craig Henrici
- Succeeded by: Brendan Sharkey

Personal details
- Born: August 24, 1934 Brooklyn, New York City, U.S.
- Died: December 18, 2019 (aged 85) Hartford, Connecticut, U.S.
- Party: Republican

Alfred C. Adinolfi (August 24, 1934 – December 18, 2019) was an American politician.

Adinolfi was born in New York City in Brooklyn. He served in the United States Air Force from 1952 to 1956. Adinolfi went to Pratt Institute in 1957 to study mechanical engineering. Adinolfi lived in Cheshire, Connecticut. He worked at DNE Technologies and was one of the managers. Adinolfi served on the Cheshire Town Council. He was a Republican member of the Connecticut House of Representatives from the 103rd District, in office from 2011 to 2017. He previously served in the State House from 1999 to 2001 and again from 2003 to 2009.

Adinolfi died on December 18, 2019, at a hospital in Hartford, aged 85.
