= Congressional Immigration Reform Caucus =

US Political Organisation

The Congressional Immigration Reform Caucus is a political organization made up of members of the United States Congress.

== Goals ==
According to the agenda posted on the founder's congressional website, and repeated in subsequent caucus declarations, the caucus was founded "to review current immigration policy, propose new immigration policies and provide a forum in Congress for addressing the positive and negative consequences of our immigration policies."

== History ==
=== Founding ===
The caucus was founded in May 1999 by Colorado Republican Tom Tancredo to bring together members of Congress opposing increased immigration and paths to citizenship for illegal immigrants.

== 113th United States Congress 2013-2015 ==
Chair: Ted Poe (R-TX)

Caucus members during the 113th US Congress included Congressmen Bill Flores (R-GA), Phil Gingrey (R-GA) and Lamar Smith (R-TX) as well as Congresswoman Diane Black (R-TN).

== 110th United States Congress 2007-2009 ==
Chair: Brian Bilbray (R-CA)

Caucus members during the 110th US Congress included Congressmen Ted Poe (R-TX), Lamar Smith (R-TX), Phil Gingrey (R-GA), Bill Sali (R-ID) and Roscoe Bartlett (R-MD). As the bipartisan Comprehensive Immigration Reform Act of 2007 approached a floor vote, caucus members coordinated with NumbersUSA to engage key senators to oppose and ultimately collapse the bill.

== 107th United States Congress 2001-2003 ==
Chair: Tom Tancredo (R-CO)

Caucus members opposed amnesty for undocumented US residents, blocking expansion of Section 245(i) of the Immigration and Nationality Act.

== See also ==
- Immigration and Nationality Act, Section 245
