= Promoting Women in Entrepreneurship Act =

- Long title: An Act to authorize the National Science Foundation to support entrepreneurial programs for women.
- Enacted by: the 115th United States Congress
- Effective: February 28, 2017

Citations
- Public law: Pub. L. 115–6 (text) (PDF)

Codification
- U.S.C. sections amended: 42 U.S.C. 1885a

Legislative history
- Introduced in the House as H.R. 255 by Elizabeth Esty (D–CT) on January 4, 2017; Passed the House on January 10, 2017 (voice vote); Passed the Senate on February 14, 2017 (unanimous consent); Signed into law by President Donald Trump on February 28, 2017

The Promoting Women in Entrepreneurship Act in the USA (Pub. L. 115–6 (text) (PDF), H.R. 255) is a 2017 public law amendment to the Science and Engineering Equal Opportunities Act (Pub. L. 96–516) to authorize the National Science Foundation to encourage its entrepreneurial programs to recruit and support women to extend their focus beyond the laboratory and into the commercial world.

== Background ==
The Promoting Women in Entrepreneurship Act was introduced in the United States House of Representatives on January 4, 2017, by Representative Elizabeth Esty of Connecticut and signed into law by President Donald Trump on February 28, 2017.

According to the Bureau of Labor Statistics, women account for 47% of the workforce, but make up only 25.6 percent of computer and mathematical occupations. In addition, only 15.4 percent of architecture and engineering jobs are filled by women. Congress also found that only 26 percent of women who earned STEM degrees actually worked in STEM related jobs. The president stated, “(Pub. L. 96–516) enables the National Science Foundation to support women inventors – of which there are many – researchers and scientists in bringing their discoveries to the business world, championing science and entrepreneurship and creating new ways to improve people’s lives.” Trump signed the bill in a room full of women including Representative Barbara Comstock, who introduced the Inspire Women Act, Senator Heidi Heitkamp, and First Lady Melania Trump. The bill was supported by both parties, with 36 Democrats and 8 Republicans signing as co-sponsors.

== Impact ==
The bill was designed to primarily improve the programs in place at the National Science Foundation in order to encourage more women to enter into the STEM fields. The Science and Engineering Equal Opportunities Act allocates funding for educational programs and for research in STEM fields, and this bill adds the ability for the Science Foundation to allocate new funding towards incentivizing women to join their educational and entrepreneurial programs. There has been little news regarding this act and its effects recently and the expected results have yet to come to fruition. However, the act still represents a trend within the Trump administration with regard to technology and women. The president has said that this issue was, "going to be addressed by my administration over the years with more and more of these bills coming out and address the barriers faced by female entrepreneurs and by those in STEM fields." Despite this, since the day of the law being signed, the Trump administration has yet to give a statement regarding future legislation that would further help improve the numbers of women in science and technology.

== See also ==
- Timeline of women's legal rights in the United States (other than voting)
