= Lamar Smith =

American politician (born 1947)

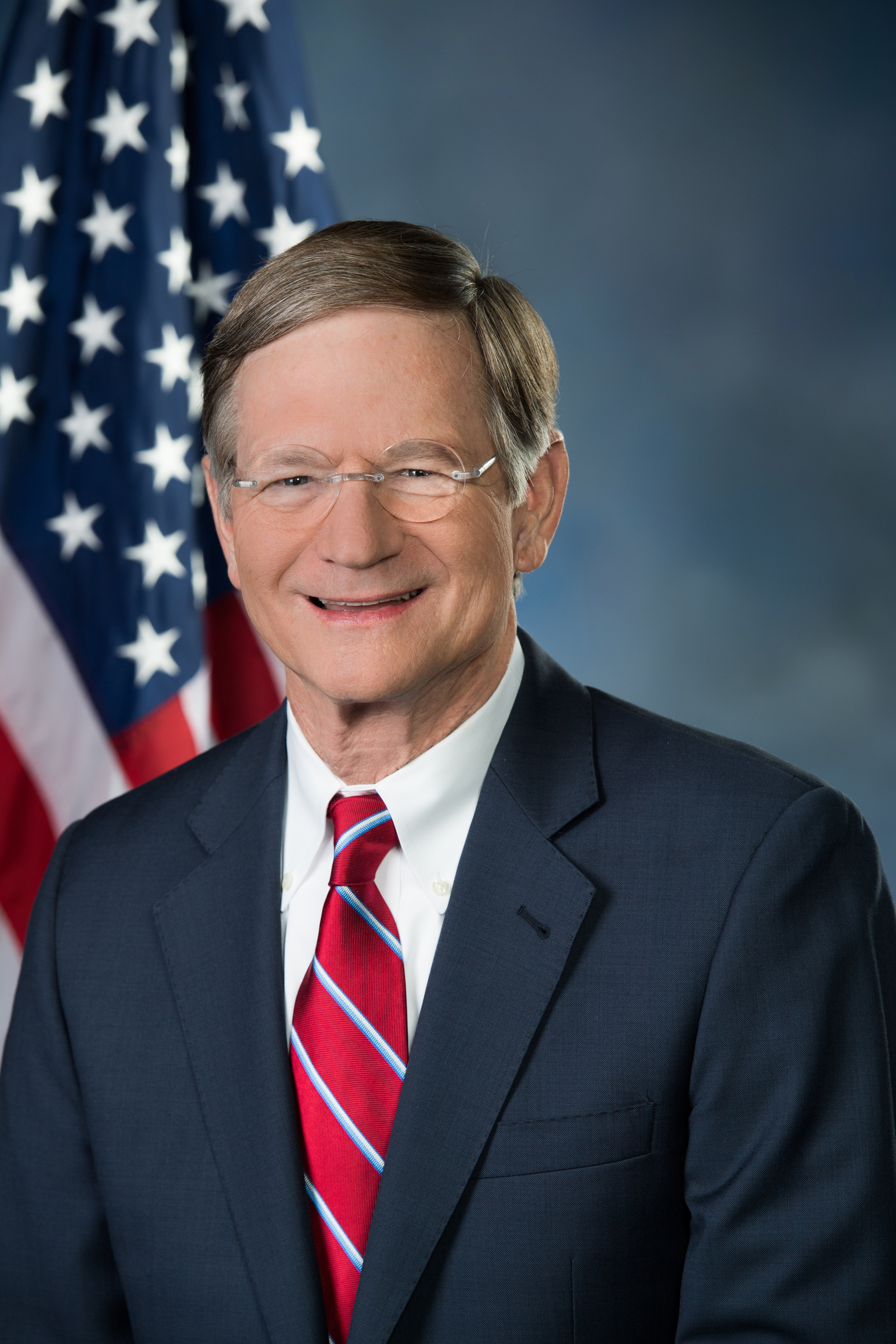

Chair of the House Science Committee
- In office January 3, 2013 – January 3, 2019
- Preceded by: Ralph Hall
- Succeeded by: Eddie Bernice Johnson

Chair of the House Judiciary Committee
- In office January 3, 2011 – January 3, 2013
- Preceded by: John Conyers
- Succeeded by: Bob Goodlatte

Chair of the House Ethics Committee
- In office January 3, 1999 – January 3, 2001
- Preceded by: James V. Hansen
- Succeeded by: Joel Hefley

Member of the U.S. House of Representatives from Texas's 21st district
- In office January 3, 1987 – January 3, 2019
- Preceded by: Tom Loeffler
- Succeeded by: Chip Roy

Member of the Bexar County Commission from the 3rd district
- In office January 1983 – January 1985
- Preceded by: Jeff Wentworth
- Succeeded by: Walter Bielstein

Member of the Texas House of Representatives from the 57th district
- In office December 15, 1981 – November 15, 1982
- Preceded by: James Nowlin
- Succeeded by: Chock Word

Personal details
- Born: Lamar Seeligson Smith; November 19, 1947 (age 78) San Antonio, Texas, U.S.
- Party: Republican
- Spouse(s): Jane Shoults (died 1991) Elizabeth Schaefer (m. 1992)
- Children: 2
- Education: Yale University (BA); Southern Methodist University (JD)
- Smith's voice Smith explaining how to use E-Verify. Recorded February 28, 2015

Lamar Seeligson Smith (born November 19, 1947) is an American politician and lobbyist who served in the United States House of Representatives for Texas's 21st congressional district for 16 terms, a district including most of the wealthier sections of San Antonio and Austin, as well as some of the Texas Hill Country. He is a member of the Republican Party. He sponsored the Stop Online Piracy Act (SOPA) and the Protecting Children From Internet Pornographers Act (PCIP). He also co-sponsored the Leahy–Smith America Invents Act.

As the head of the House Science Committee, Smith has been criticized for his denial of, and promotion of conspiracy theories about, climate change and for receiving funding from oil and gas companies. He is a former contributor to Breitbart News, a website known for publishing dubious claims about climate change.

In November 2017, Smith announced that he would retire from Congress at the end of his current term, and not seek re-election in 2018. In 2021, Smith registered as a lobbyist for the surveillance firm HawkEye 360 on behalf of Akin Gump Strauss Hauer & Feld. In 2022, he officially registered as a foreign agent.

== Early life, education, and legal career ==
Smith attended a private high school, then called Texas Military Institute, now known as TMI — The Episcopal School of Texas, and graduated in 1965. He then earned a B.A. in American Studies from Yale University (1969) and a J.D. from Southern Methodist University (1975).

In 1969, Smith was hired as a management intern by the Small Business Administration in Washington, D.C. He was a business and financial writer for the Christian Science Monitor (1970–1972), was admitted to the Texas bar in 1975, and went into private practice in San Antonio with the firm of Maebius and Duncan, Inc.

== State politics ==
In 1978, he was elected chairman of the Republican Party of Bexar County. In 1980, Smith was elected to the Texas House of Representatives representing Bexar County, the 57th District. He served on the Energy Resources Committee and the Fire Ants Select Committee. In 1982, he was elected to the 3rd Precinct of the Bexar County Commissioners Court and served from 1983 to 1986.

== U.S. House of Representatives ==
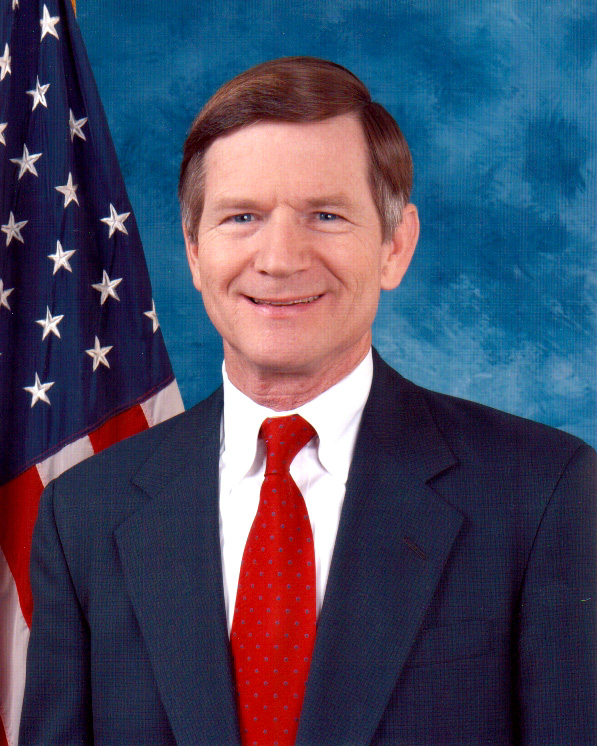
Earlier portrait of Congressman Lamar Smith

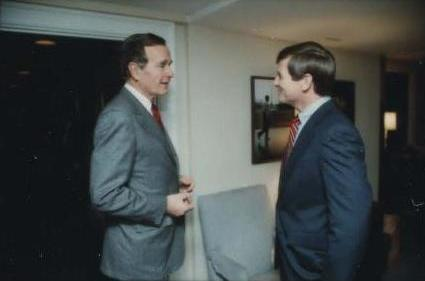
Smith greets President George H. W. Bush in 1991

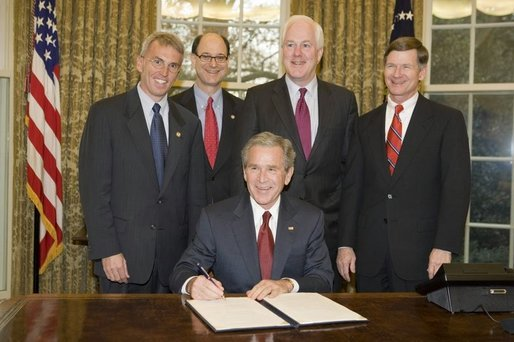
Smith watches as President George W. Bush signs an Executive Order in 2005

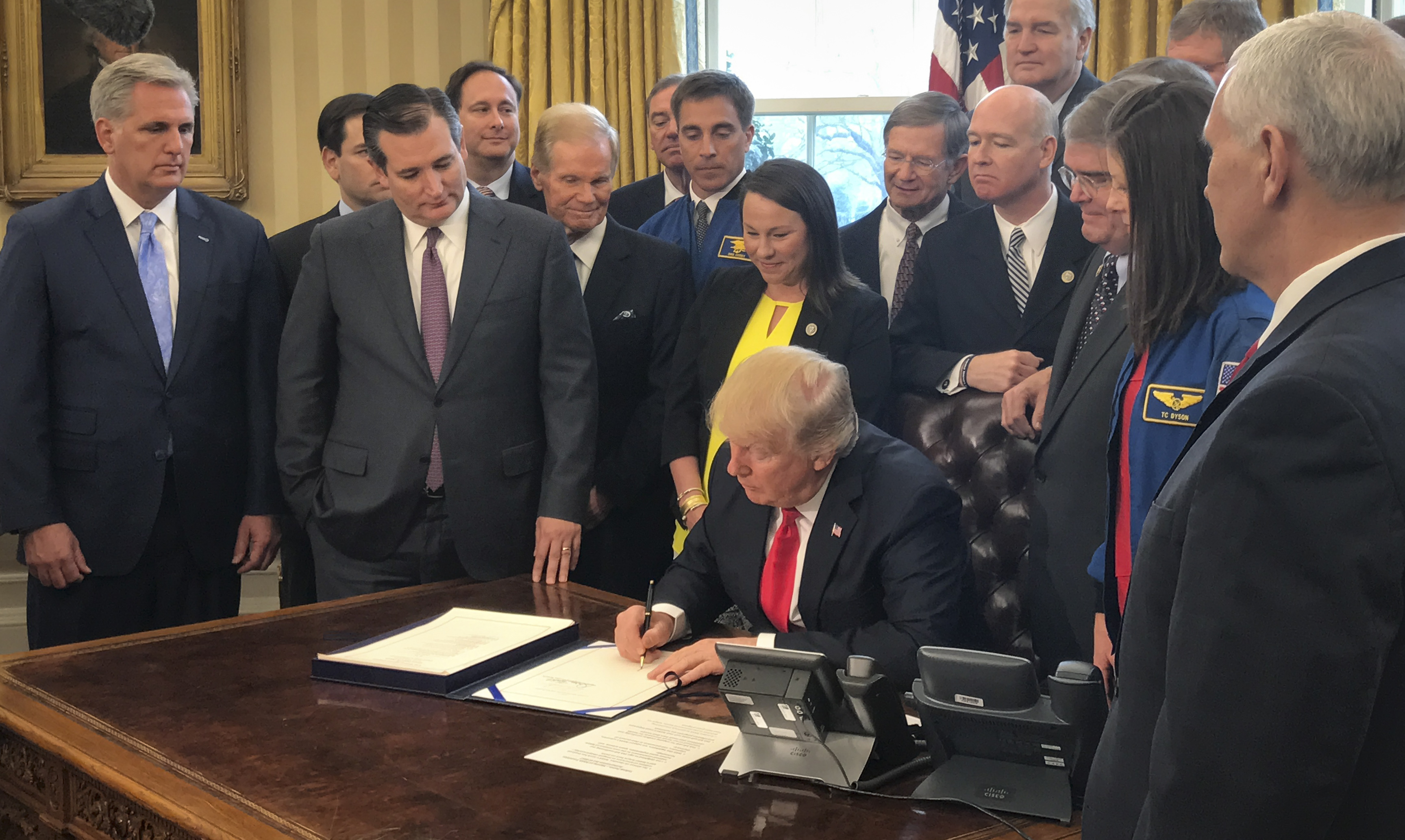
Smith looks on as President Donald Trump signs the NASA Transition Authorization Act of 2017

=== Elections ===
==== 1986 ====
In 1986, four-term incumbent Republican U.S. Congressman Tom Loeffler of Texas's 21st congressional district decided to retire to run for governor of Texas. Smith led a crowded six-way primary with 31% of the vote and then defeated Van Archer in the run-off election 54–46%. He won the general election with 61% of the vote.

==== 1988–2002 ====
During this time period, he never won re-election with less than 72% of the vote.

==== 2004 ====
Smith's district was significantly altered in the 2003 Texas redistricting. While he lost most of the Hill Country to the 23rd District, he picked up a significant portion of Austin, including the area around the University of Texas, a traditional bastion of liberalism. Smith won re-election with 62% of the vote, Smith's lowest winning percentage since his initial run in 1986.

==== 2006 ====
In 2006, the Supreme Court of the United States threw out the 23rd District in League of United Latin American Citizens v. Perry on the grounds that it violated the rights of Latino voters. The 23rd is the largest district in the nation (not counting the at-large districts), stretching across 800 road miles from El Paso to San Antonio. Due to its size, nearly every district in the El Paso-San Antonio corridor had to be redrawn. Smith regained most of the Hill Country, but kept a large portion of his share of Austin, including the area around the University of Texas.

In November 2006 the Texas Legislative Council found that nearly two-thirds of voters in District 21 cast ballots for statewide Republican candidates in 2004. In the November 2006 open election, Smith faced six candidates. He defeated Democrats John Courage and Gene Kelly 60–24–9%. This was Smith's lowest winning percentage of his career.

==== 2008 ====
He only faced one candidate, Libertarian nominee James Arthur Strohm, and defeated him with 80% of the vote.

==== 2010 ====
He faced two candidates, Democratic nominee Lainey Melnick and Libertarian nominee James Arthur Strohm, and won with 69% of the vote.

==== 2012 ====
Smith faced five challengers in the 2012 general election on November 6, 2012: Candace Duval (Dem), John-Henry Liberty (Lib), Fidel Castillo (Grn), Bill Stout (Grn), and Carlos Pena (Ind). He won the race with 63% of the vote.

==== 2014 ====
Smith won re-nomination to fifteenth House term in the Republican primary held on March 4, 2014. He received 40,262 votes (60.4 percent). His runner-up was Matt McCall (born c. 1963) of San Antonio, with 22,596 votes (33.9 percent). Michael J. Smith polled the remaining 3,772 votes (5.7 percent).

==== 2016 ====
Smith won re-nomination to a sixteenth term in the House in the Republican primary held on March 1. He received 69,872 votes (60.1 percent). Running against him once more was Matt McCall, who drew 33,597 votes (28.9 percent). McCall polled 11,000 more votes than he did in 2014, but his percent went down because of higher turnout. Two other candidates held the remaining 11 percent of the ballots cast.

Smith faced the Democrat Tom Wakely (born c. 1953) of San Antonio in the November 8 general election. Smith (Republican) won with 57.0%; Tom Wakely (Democratic) got 36.5%; Mark Loewe (Libertarian) got 4.1%; and Antonio Diaz (Green) got 2.4%. It was easily the closest race of Smith's career, and the closest since the GOP began its current run in the district; Loeffler won his first term in 1978 with 57 percent of the vote.

=== Tenure ===
==== Abortion ====
Smith has consistently supported restrictions on abortion. In 2009, Smith voted to prohibit federally funded abortions. In 2006, Smith voted for the Abortion Pain Bill, which would "ensure that women seeking an abortion are fully informed regarding the pain experienced by their unborn child", and the Child Interstate Abortion Notification Act, which would "prohibit taking minors across State lines in circumvention of laws requiring the involvement of parents in abortion decisions". In 2008, the National Right to Life Committee, an anti-abortion advocacy group, gave Representative Smith a rating of 100 on a point system in which points were assigned for actions in support of legislation they described as pro-life.

==== Digital Millennium Copyright Act (DMCA) ====
On April 23, 2006 CNET reported that Smith was introducing a bill that "would expand the DMCA's restrictions on software that can bypass copy protections and grant federal police more wiretapping and enforcement powers". The move sparked a negative response among technology enthusiasts in opposition to the Digital Millennium Copyright Act.

==== Marijuana ====
Smith is a strong opponent of marijuana legalization; as chairman of the House Committee on the Judiciary, Lamar blocked committee consideration of the Ending Federal Marijuana Prohibition Act of 2011, a bill to repeal the federal prohibition on marijuana and allow the states to set laws on cultivation, sales, use, and taxation. Smith stated that "marijuana use and distribution – has a high potential for abuse" and that "decriminalizing marijuana will only lead to millions more Americans becoming addicted to drugs and greater profits for drug cartels who fund violence along the U.S.-Mexico border."

==== Donations ====
In 2011 Smith had received $37,250 in campaign contributions from the Beer, Wine and Liquor Lobby, and $65,800 total between 2009 and 2011. He received more than $133,000 from the Content Industry, including Industry groups and individual companies through mid-2011. Another $60,000 was donated by these companies in the 2012 Election Cycle. Maplight.org listed the Beer, Wine, and Liquor Lobby as third among Smith's top ten campaign contributors, and Content Industry as #1.

==== Leahy–Smith America Invents Act ====
In 2011 Smith co-sponsored the Leahy–Smith America Invents Act, a bill that made significant changes to the U.S. patent system. The bill was signed into law by President Barack Obama on September 16, 2011. The law will switch U.S. rights to a patent from the present first-to-invent system to a first inventor-to-file system for patent applications filed on or after March 16, 2013.

==== Space Launch Liability Indemnification Extension Act ====
On November 20, 2013, Smith introduced the Space Launch Liability Indemnification Extension Act (H.R. 3547; 113th Congress), a bill that would extend until December 31, 2014, the current limitation on liability of commercial space launch companies. Under the current system, the space launch company is liable for any damages up to $500 million, after which the U.S. Government will pay the damages in the range of $500 million to $2.7 billion. Above $2.7 billion, the company is again responsible.

==== STEM Education Act of 2014 ====
On July 8, 2014, Smith introduced the STEM Education Act of 2014 (H.R. 5031; 113th Congress), a bill that would add computer science to the definition of STEM fields used by the United States federal government in determining grants and education funding. Smith said that "we have to capture and hold the desire of our nation's youth to study science and engineering so they will want to pursue these careers. A health and viable STEM workforce, literate in all STEM subjects including computer science, is critical to American industries. We must work to ensure that students continue to go into these fields so that their ideas can lead to a more innovative and prosperous America."

==== Stop Online Piracy Act (SOPA) ====
On October 26, 2011, Smith introduced the Stop Online Piracy Act (H.R. 3261), also known as SOPA. The bill sought to expand the ability of U.S. law enforcement to fight online trafficking in copyrighted intellectual property and counterfeit goods. SOPA faced significant opposition from internet freedom advocacy groups and web companies, and on January 15, 2012, House Majority Leader Eric Cantor cancelled a planned vote on the bill.

==== Protecting Children from Internet Pornographers (PCIP) Act ====
On May 25, 2011, Smith introduced the Protecting Children from Internet Pornographers Act of 2011, which sought to change sentencing rules and mandated that Internet service providers (ISPs) keep logs of customer data (such as name, IP addresses, credit card numbers, and bank account numbers) for at least a year. Representative Zoe Lofgren, (D-Calif.) and Rep. John Conyers (D-Mich.) criticized PCIP. Lofgren said a better name would be "Keep Every Americans' Digital Data for Submission to the Federal Government Without a Warrant Act". Conyers said the bill would allow use of the information for purposes entirely unrelated to fighting child pornography.

==== Taxes ====
Smith is a signer of Americans for Tax Reform's Taxpayer Protection Pledge.

==== Climate change ====
Smith has unequivocally stated that he believes the climate is changing, and that humans play a role in climate change. However, he questions the extent of the impact and accuses scientists of promoting a personal agenda unsupported by evidence. Smith has made a number of false and misleading claims about climate change.

As of 2015, Smith has received more than $600,000 from the fossil fuel industry during his career in Congress. In 2014, Smith got more money from fossil fuels than he did from any other industry. Smith publicly denies global warming. Under his leadership, the House Science committee has held hearings that feature the views of climate change deniers, subpoenaed the records and communications of scientists who published papers that Smith disapproved of, and attempted to cut NASA's earth sciences budget. He has been criticized for conducting "witch hunts" against climate scientists. In his capacity as chair of the House Committee on Science, Space and Technology, Smith issued more subpoenas in his first three years than the committee had for its entire 54-year history. In a June 2016 response letter to the Union of Concerned Scientists, Mr. Smith cited the work of the House Un-American Activities Committee in the 1950s as valid legal precedent for his investigation.

On December 1, 2016, as chair on the House Committee on Science, Space and Technology, he tweeted out on behalf of that committee a Breitbart News article denying climate change.

==== World Health Organization ====
In February 2018, Smith criticized the World Health Organization's (WHO) cancer research program for its finding that glyphosate, the active component in the herbicide Roundup, is probably carcinogen.

==== Travel ban executive order ====
Smith supported President Donald Trump's 2017 Executive Order 13769 to ban citizens of seven Muslim-majority countries from entering the United States, saying "I appreciate President Trump's effort to protect innocent Americans from those who might commit terrorist acts. We ought to take every reasonable step possible to protect the American people. Those from terrorist sponsoring countries should not be admitted until they can be properly vetted by our national security agencies."

=== Committee assignments ===
Smith served as chairman of the Committee on Science, Space and Technology for the 113th Congress, having replaced Ralph Hall. Smith has previously served on the Committee on Homeland Security, Committee on the Judiciary (Chairman), the Republican Study Committee, the Congressional Immigration Reform Caucus and the Tea Party Caucus.

On January 30, 2015, Law360 reported that Smith has sent letters to the U.S. Department of Health and Human Services, the Centers for Medicare and Medicaid Services, and to the chief technology officer at the White House Office of Science and Technology Policy, asking for an explanation of media claims of HealthCare.gov sharing private data supplied by subscribers with third-parties such as Google, Twitter, and YouTube.

Smith is a member of the Congressional Arts Caucus, the Congressional Constitution Caucus and the Congressional Western Caucus.

== Personal life ==
In 1992, he married Elizabeth Lynn Schaefer, a Christian Science practitioner and teacher, as was his first wife, Jane Shoults, before her death in 1991. They have two children, Nell Seeligson (born 1976) and Tobin Wells (born 1979), from his previous marriage.

== Electoral history ==
Texas's 21st congressional district: Results 1986–2016
Year	Name	Party	Votes	%	Name	Party	Votes	%	Name	Party	Votes	%	Name	Party	Votes	%
1986	Lamar Smith	Republican	100,346	61%	Pete Snelson	Democratic	63,779	39%	James Robinson	Libertarian	1,432	1%				
1988	Lamar Smith	Republican	203,989	93%	James Robinson	Libertarian	14,801	7%								
1990	Lamar Smith	Republican	144,570	75%	Kirby Roberts	Democratic	48,585	25%								
1992	Lamar Smith	Republican	190,979	72%	James Gaddy	Democratic	62,827	24%	William Grisham	Libertarian	10,847	4%				
1994	Lamar Smith	Republican	165,595	90%	Kerry Lowry	Independent	18,480	10%								
1996	Lamar Smith	Republican	205,830	76%	Gordon Wharton	Democratic	60,338	22%	Randy Rutenbeck	Natural Law	3,139	1%				
1998	Lamar Smith	Republican	165,047	91%	Jeffrey Blunt	Libertarian	15,561	9%								
2000	Lamar Smith	Republican	251,049	76%	Jim Green	Democratic	73,326	22%	C.W. Steinbrecher	Libertarian	6,503	2%				
2002	Lamar Smith	Republican	161,836	73%	John Courage	Democratic	56,206	25%	D.G. Roberts	Libertarian	4,051	2%				
2004	Lamar Smith	Republican	209,774	61%	Rhett Smith	Democratic	121,129	36%	Jason Pratt	Libertarian	10,216	3%				
2006	Lamar Smith	Republican	122,486	60%	John Courage	Democratic	49,957	25%	Gene Kelly	Democratic	18,355	9%	Tommy Calvert	Independent	5,280	3%
2008	Lamar Smith	Republican	243,471	80%	James Strohm	Libertarian	60,879	20%								
2010	Lamar Smith	Republican	162,924	69%	Lainey Melnick	Democratic	65,927	28%	James Strohm	Libertarian	7,694	3%				
2012	Lamar Smith	Republican	187,015	61%	Candace Duval	Democratic	109,326	35%	John-Henry Liberty	Libertarian	12,524	4%				
2014	Lamar Smith	Republican	135,660	72%	Antonio Diaz	Green	27,831	15%	Ryan Shields	Libertarian	25,505	13%				
2016	Lamar Smith	Republican	202,967	57%	Tom Wakely	Democratic	129,765	36%	Mark Loewe	Libertarian	14,735	4%	Antonio Diaz	Green	8,564	2%

== See also ==
- Equal Justice for United States Military Personnel Act of 2007

U.S. House of Representatives
Preceded by Tom Loeffler	Member of the U.S. House of Representatives from Texas's 21st congressional district 1987–2019	Succeeded by Chip Roy
Preceded by James V. Hansen	Chair of the House Ethics Committee; 1999–2001	Succeeded by Joel Hefley
Preceded by John Conyers	Ranking Member of the House Judiciary Committee; 2007–2011	Succeeded by John Conyers
New office	Ranking Member of the House Ethics Enforcement Task Force; 2007–2008	Position abolished
Preceded by John Conyers	Chair of the House Judiciary Committee; 2011–2013	Succeeded by Bob Goodlatte
Preceded by Ralph Hall	Chair of the House Science Committee; 2013–2019	Succeeded by Eddie Bernice Johnson
U.S. order of precedence (ceremonial)
Preceded by Jim Cooper as Former U.S. Representative	Order of precedence of the United States as Former U.S. Representative	Succeeded by David Dreier as Former U.S. Representative
