= STEM Education Act of 2014 =

- Long title: To define STEM education to include computer science, and to support existing STEM education programs at the National Science Foundation.
- Announced in: the 113th United States Congress
- Sponsored by: Rep. Lamar Smith (R, TX-21)
- Number of co-sponsors: 9

Codification
- U.S.C. sections affected: 42 U.S.C. § 1862n–1a, 42 U.S.C. § 1862n–1
- Agencies affected: National Aeronautics and Space Administration, National Science Foundation, National Oceanic and Atmospheric Administration, United States Environmental Protection Agency, United States Department of Energy, National Institute of Standards and Technology

Legislative history
- Introduced in the House as H.R. 5031 by Rep. Lamar Smith (R, TX-21) on July 8, 2014; Committee consideration by United States House Committee on Science, Space and Technology; Passed the House on July 14, 2014 (voice vote)

The STEM Education Act of 2014 (H.R. 5031) is a bill that would add computer science to the definition of STEM fields used by the United States federal government in determining grants and education funding. It would open up some training programs to teachers pursuing their master's degrees, not just teachers who had already earned one.

It was introduced and passed in the United States House of Representatives during the 113th United States Congress.

== Background ==
"STEM" is an acronym referring to the academic disciplines of science, technology, engineering, and mathematics. The term is typically used in the US when addressing education policy and curriculum choices in schools from k-12 through college to improve competitiveness in technology development. It has implications for workforce development, national security concerns and immigration policy. In the United States, the acronym began to be used in education and immigration debates in initiatives to begin to address the perceived lack of qualified candidates for high-tech jobs. It also addresses concern that the subjects are often taught in isolation, instead of as an integrated curriculum. Maintaining a citizenry that is well versed in the STEM fields is a key portion of the public education agenda of the United States.

== Provisions of the bill ==
There are three major components of the bill.

First, the bill would expand the definition of "STEM education" to include education in the field of computer science. This definition is used by NASA, the National Science Foundation, the National Oceanic and Atmospheric Administration, the National Institute of Standards and Technology, the Environmental Protection Agency, and the United States Department of Energy in their programs. This would "ensure federal grants and programs related to STEM education include computer science education."

Second, the bill would confirm the importance of STEM education outside of school.

A final provision of the bill would make "classroom teachers with bachelor’s degrees in STEM fields who are pursuing master’s degrees eligible for NSF-administered Master Teaching Fellowships in exchange for a four-year commitment to teach in high-need school districts."

== Procedural history ==
The STEM Education Act of 2014 was introduced into the United States House of Representatives on July 8, 2014 by Rep. Lamar Smith (R, TX-21). It was referred to the United States House Committee on Science, Space and Technology. On July 14, 2014, the House voted to pass the bill in a voice vote.

== Debate and discussion ==
The IEEE-USA supported the bill, with President Gary Blank saying that "IEEE-USA strongly supports federal, state and local efforts to improve K-12 science, technology, engineering and math education, particularly programs that increase student interest and engagement in engineering and computer science."

Rep. Elizabeth Esty (D-CT), who co-sponsored the bill, said that "STEM education is critical to preparing our students for high-demand careers in engineering, manufacturing, and information technology." According to Esty, she frequently hears from "manufactures and small business owners that it's increasingly difficult to find workers with the right skill sets to fill the jobs in demand."

Rep. Smith, who introduced the bill, said that "we have to capture and hold the desire of our nation's youth to study science and engineering so they will want to pursue these careers. A healthy and viable STEM workforce, literate in all STEM subjects including computer science, is critical to American industries. We must work to ensure that students continue to go into these fields so that their ideas can lead to a more innovative and prosperous America."

== See also ==
- List of bills in the 113th United States Congress
- STEM fields
