= Ted Poe =

American politician (born 1948)

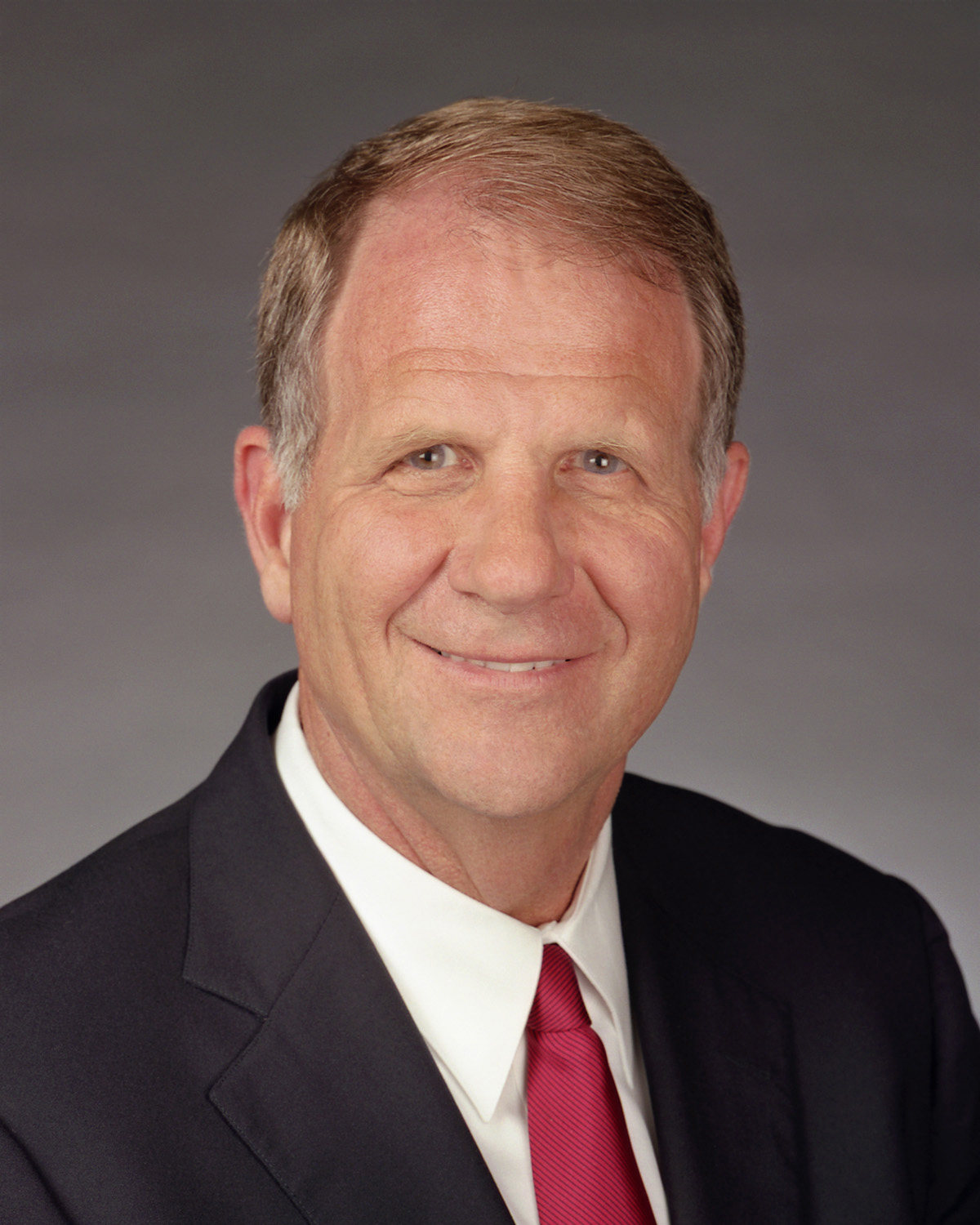

Member of the U.S. House of Representatives from Texas's 2nd district
- In office January 3, 2005 – January 3, 2019
- Preceded by: Nick Lampson (redistricted)
- Succeeded by: Dan Crenshaw

Personal details
- Born: Lloyd Theodore Poe; September 10, 1948 (age 78) Temple, Texas, U.S.
- Party: Republican
- Spouse: Carol Poe
- Education: Abilene Christian University (BA); University of Houston (JD)

Military service
- Branch/service: United States Air Force
- Years of service: 1970–1976
- Rank: Sergeant
- Unit: Air Force Reserve Command
- Poe's voice Poe on the efficacy of Project Exile in curbing gun violence. Recorded March 5, 2013

Lloyd Theodore Poe (born September 10, 1948) is an American politician who represented Texas's 2nd congressional district in the United States House of Representatives from 2005 to 2019. Poe was the first Republican to represent the 2nd district.

In November 2017, Poe announced that he would retire from Congress, and not seek re-election in 2018. He was succeeded by Dan Crenshaw.

== Judicial career ==
After serving as a chief felony prosecutor in Harris County (Houston) for eight years, Poe was appointed a felony court judge in Harris County in 1981, becoming one of the youngest judges in the state. In this position, he gained national prominence for his unusual criminal sentences that included ordering thieves to carry signs in front of stores from which they stole. However, in at least one case, Poe amended the sentence afterwards without notifying the victim's family.

== Elections to United States Congress ==
In November 2004, Poe ran for the U.S. House in the 2nd District. The district had previously been the 9th, represented by four-term Democrat Nick Lampson. However, as the result of a controversial mid-decade redistricting, the new 2nd was considerably more Republican than the old 9th. It lost Galveston and the area around the Johnson Space Center, while picking up several heavily Republican areas north of Houston, including Poe's home in Humble. Poe won 55% of the vote to Lampson's 43%. While Lampson trounced Poe in Beaumont and Port Arthur, Poe swamped Lampson in the Harris County portion of the district.

Poe made border security a centerpiece of his re-election strategy, calling for "more [National] Guardsmen on the border front".

In November 2006, Poe won a second term with 65.6% of the vote, defeating Democrat Gary Binderim, who took 32.7%.

In November 2008 and 2010, Poe did not face a Democratic challenger in the general election. In 2008, he defeated Libertarian Craig Wolfe, taking 88.9% of the vote to Wolfe's 11.1%. In 2010, he defeated Libertarian David Smith with 88.6 percent of the vote to Smith's 11.4 percent.

Poe's district was made significantly more compact in the 2010s round of redistricting. It was cut back to an exclusively Harris County-based district, wheeling from Humble through northern and western Houston to just outside downtown. This district was slightly less Republican than its predecessor, and Poe was elected three more times from this district with over 60 percent of the vote.

Poe announced on November 7, 2017, that he would not seek re-election in 2018.

== Committee assignments ==
- Committee on Foreign Affairs
  - Subcommittee on Europe and Eurasia
  - Subcommittee on Terrorism, Nonproliferation, and Trade (Chair)
  - Subcommittee on Oversight and Investigations (Vice Chair)
- Committee on the Judiciary
  - Subcommittee on Intellectual Property, Competition, and the Internet
  - Subcommittee on Crime, Terrorism, and Homeland Security
  - Subcommittee on Immigration Policy and Enforcement

In addition to Poe's committee assignments, he is the founder and co-chair of the Congressional Victim's Rights Caucus. Since 2012, he has been the head of the Congressional Serbian Caucus. He is also a member of the Republican Study Committee, the Congressional Immigration Reform Caucus, the Congressional Immigration Reform Caucus, the Tea Party Caucus, the House Baltic Caucus and the United States Congressional International Conservation Caucus.

== Political positions ==
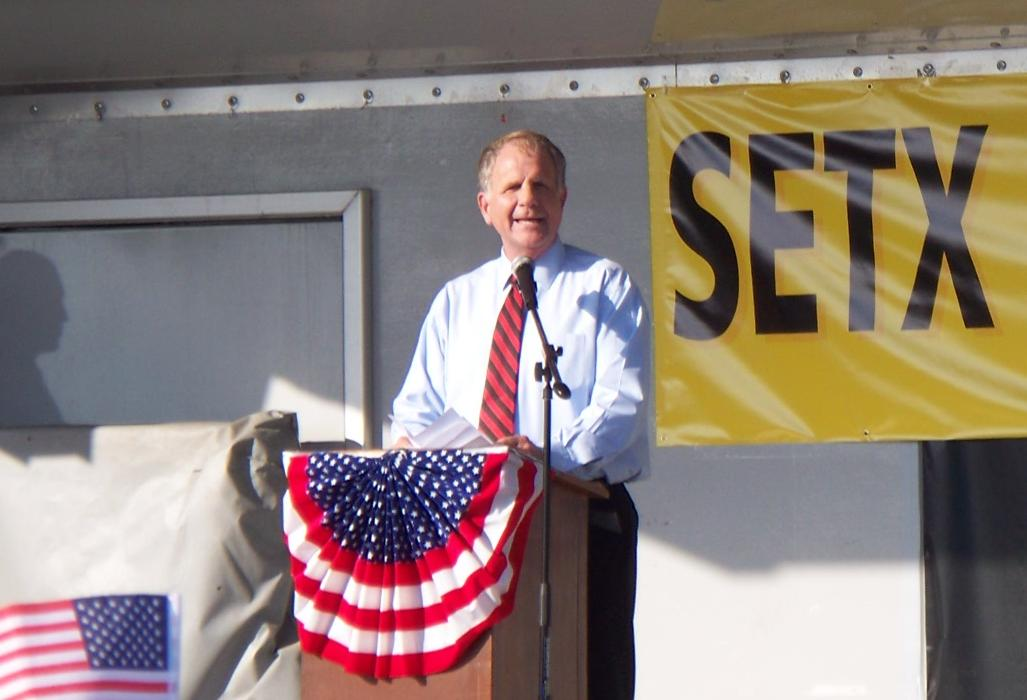
Ted Poe speaking at a Tea Party in Texas in 2009

=== Taxes ===
Poe is a signer of Americans for Tax Reform's Taxpayer Protection Pledge.

=== Abortion ===
Poe received a 0 rating from the abortion rights group NARAL in 2007 and a rating of 100 from the National Right to Life Committee in 2007–2008. He also voted for the Prohibiting Federal Funding of Abortion Services amendment on November 7, 2009.

=== Fiscal policy ===
In 2008, the National Taxpayers Union, an organization that supports "lower taxes and smaller government", gave Poe the grade B+, and in 2007 received a rating of 90 from the group Americans for Tax Reform, an organization that advocates "taxes [that] are simpler, [and] flatter". Poe voted against the 2009 Economic Stimulus Package (HR 1) and the 2010 Concurrent Budget Resolution (S. Con. Res. 13). The Club for Growth PAC gave him a power ranking of 85.85%.

=== Healthcare ===
Poe favors repealing the Affordable Care Act (Obamacare). Poe does not support what he calls "government-run health care". Poe voted "Nay" on the Health Care and Insurance Law Amendments bill on November 7, 2009. In 2008, Poe voted for the Medicare Bill (HR 6331). Poe supports healthcare reform that would "Allow insurance to be purchased across state lines, provide for a safety net for catastrophic injury or illness…and allow for a health savings account". Poe resigned from the Freedom Caucus in March 2017, after the Caucus's opposition to the American Health Care Act of 2017 contributed to Speaker Ryan's decision to pull the bill. Poe supported the March 2017 version of the American Health Care Act before its collapse.

On May 4, 2017, he voted to repeal the Patient Protection and Affordable Care Act (Obamacare) and pass the American Health Care Act.

=== Immigration ===
Poe is an advocate of stronger action against illegal immigration and increased security on the Mexico–United States border. He voted for the Secure Fence Act of 2006 and against the DREAM Act when it was introduced in 2010. He opposed the Obama administration's Deferred Action for Childhood Arrivals, calling it "an imperial decree" that violated immigration law.

Poe co-sponsored, along with fellow Republican Representative Steve King, the "Deport Foreign Convicted Criminals Act of 2011" (H.R. 3256), which would require the U.S. government to deny certain visas to citizens of nations that refuse to accept convicted foreign nationals that the U.S. is seeking to deport. If passed, the law would mandate visa denials to nationals of 153 nations worldwide. Poe's bill was opposed by the American Immigration Lawyers Association, which noted that the bill would block visas issued to citizens of American allies, including Israel, Britain, and Canada. The bill was also criticized by Democratic Representative Jerrold Nadler of New York, who called it "the most stupid bill I've ever seen" and stated it would wipe out the U.S. tourism industry.

=== Human trafficking ===
Poe introduced the Justice for Victims of Trafficking Act of 2013 and the Justice for Victims of Trafficking Act of 2015, a bill to combat human trafficking. The 2015 bill passed the House in a 420–3 vote and, following a delay, passed the Senate in a 99–0 vote. The bill was signed into law by President Barack Obama in May 2015.

== Controversies ==
In 1998, Judge Poe was known for creative sentencing, including ordering offenders to shovel manure, a practice which led to the nickname "The King of Shame." Poe explained, "The people I see have too good a self-esteem. I want them to feel guilty about what they've done. I don't want 'em to leave the courthouse having warm fuzzies inside." Poe's "public notice" sentences included ordering a drunk driver to stand outside a bar, wearing a sign that said "I killed two people while driving drunk."

As a state judge, in November 2002, Poe ruled that he would permit the PBS documentary show Frontline to videotape jury deliberations of a capital murder case. There was considerable concern that this would affect the result of the trial, possibly by skewing the composition of the jury, and the decision was appealed by Harris County prosecutors. The Texas Court of Criminal Appeals, the state's highest criminal appellate court, ruled against Poe's decision and prohibited the videotaping.

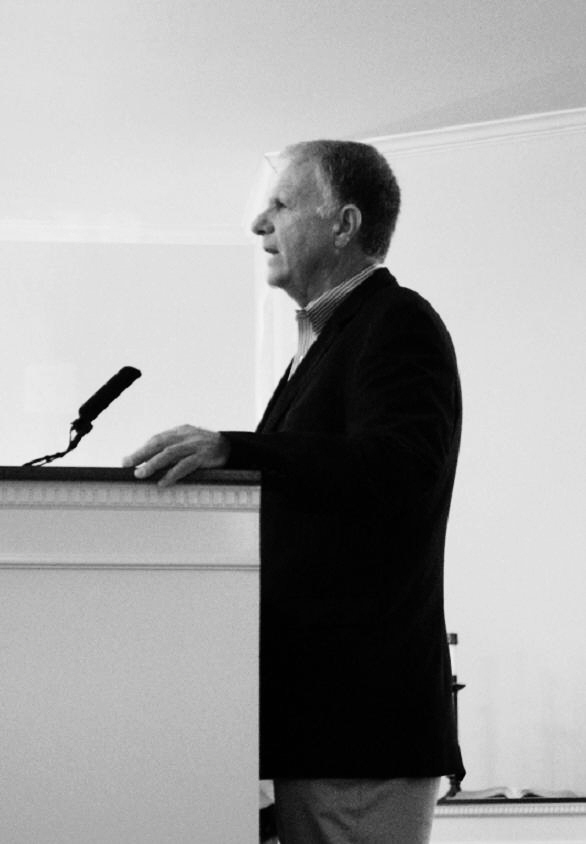
Poe speaking in 2009

On June 7, 2009, Poe signed on as a co-sponsor of H.R. 1503, the bill introduced as a reaction to conspiracy theories which claimed that U.S. president Barack Obama is not a natural born U.S. citizen. On July 23, 2009, he appeared on CNN's Lou Dobbs Tonight in which he claimed that Certifications of Live Birth issued by Hawaii State Department of Health cannot be used to obtain a U.S. passport, which is untrue. His support of H.R. 1503 and public advocacy for it earned him a negative editorial in the Houston Chronicle.

In August 2011, AlterNet reported that Poe, along with John Culberson and Michael McCaul, was attempting to remove the right of deceased soldiers' families to choose which prayers, if any, were to be read at a soldier's funeral. The three politicians were said to be attempting to impose Christian ceremonies on the military funerals of everybody who has served in the military, regardless of whether or not the deceased was Christian and with or without the consent of the family of the deceased. The three politicians stated their demands were a response to Veterans Affairs (VA) banning Christian prayers at military funerals. The VA, however, asserted that this claim was "blatantly false" and that VA respects a family's "rights to pray however they choose at our national cemeteries".

In 2017, his bill to have Congress monitor religious reform and interpretation in Saudi Arabia aroused international concerns that the United States was behind societal upheavals in that country.

== Personal life ==
Poe and his wife, Carol, have four children (Kim, Kara, Kurt, and Kellee).

Poe announced on July 13, 2016, that he had recently been diagnosed with leukemia and would be seeking treatment at University of Texas MD Anderson Cancer Center.

== In popular culture ==
Poe was interviewed about his controversial creative sentencing practices while still a Texas district judge by Jon Ronson for Ronson's 2015 book, So You've Been Publicly Shamed.

In 2011, Poe gave a speech on the house floor concerning excessive spending by the Justice Department on refreshments served at conferences at the Capitol Hilton. He expressed significant disapproval that muffins apparently costing $16 each were served at the conferences. The speech was made notable by his humorous opening line, "Madame Speaker, do you know the muffin man?" The speech was further popularized by his inclusion in a Songify the News video by the Gregory Brothers in which he is autotuned, appearing to sing a song about the muffin man.

U.S. House of Representatives
Preceded by Jim Turner	Member of the U.S. House of Representatives from Texas's 2nd congressional district 2005–2019	Succeeded by Dan Crenshaw
U.S. order of precedence (ceremonial)
Preceded by Randy Neugebauer as Former U.S. Representative	Order of precedence of the United States as Former U.S. Representative	Succeeded by Dave Loebsack as Former U.S. Representative
