= United States House Judiciary Subcommittee on Crime and Federal Government Surveillance =

Subcommittee of Committee on the Judiciary
- Active United States House of Representatives; 119th Congress

Leadership
- Chair: Andy Biggs (R)
- Ranking Member: Lucy McBath (D)

Structure
- Seats: 12 (12 currently filled) 7/7 5/5
- Political parties: Majority (7): Republican (6); Independent (1); Minority (5): Democratic (5)

Meeting place
- 2138, Rayburn House Office Building; Washington, D.C. 20515

Phone number
- (202)-225-6906

The Subcommittee on Crime and Federal Government Surveillance is a subcommittee within the House Judiciary Committee. It was previously known as the Subcommittee on Crime, Terrorism and Homeland Security.

== Jurisdiction ==
The Federal Criminal Code, the administration of justice, federal prosecutors, drug enforcement, sentencing, internal and homeland security, the Federal Rules of Criminal Procedure, the use of surveillance tools by federal law enforcement, and prisons.

== Members, 119th Congress ==
Majority	Minority
Andy Biggs, Arizona, Chair; Tom Tiffany, Wisconsin; Troy Nehls, Texas; Barry Moore, Alabama; Laurel Lee, Florida; Brad Knott, North Carolina	Lucy McBath, Georgia, Ranking Member; Jared Moskowitz, Florida; Dan Goldman, New York; Steve Cohen, Tennessee
Ex officio
Jim Jordan, Ohio	Jaime Raskin, Maryland

== Historical membership rosters ==
=== 115th Congress ===
Majority	Minority
Trey Gowdy, South Carolina, Chairman; Louie Gohmert, Texas, Vice Chair; Jim Sensenbrenner, Wisconsin; Steve Chabot, Ohio; Ted Poe, Texas; Jason Chaffetz, Utah; John Ratcliffe, Texas; Martha Roby, Alabama; Mike Johnson, Louisiana	Sheila Jackson Lee, Texas, Ranking Member; Val Demings, Florida; Karen Bass, California; Cedric Richmond, Louisiana; Hakeem Jeffries, New York; Ted Lieu, California; Jamie Raskin, Maryland
Ex officio
Bob Goodlatte, Virginia	Jerrold Nadler, New York

=== 116th Congress ===
Majority	Minority
Karen Bass, California, Chair; Sheila Jackson Lee, Texas; Val Demings, Florida, Vice Chair; Lucy McBath, Georgia; Ted Deutsch, Florida; Cedric Richmond, Louisiana; Hakeem Jeffries, New York; David Cicilline, Rhode Island; Ted Lieu, California; Madeleine Dean, Pennsylvania; Debbie Mucarsel-Powell, Florida; Steve Cohen, Tennessee	John Ratcliffe, Texas, Ranking Member (until May 22, 2020); Jim Sensenbrenner, Wisconsin; Steve Chabot, Ohio; Tom McClintock, California; Debbie Lesko, Arizona; Guy Reschenthaler, Pennsylvania; Ben Cline, Virginia; Greg Steube, Florida
Ex officio
Jerrold Nadler, New York	Doug Collins, Georgia (until March 12, 2020); Jim Jordan, Ohio (March 12, 2020 on)

=== 117th Congress ===
Majority	Minority
Sheila Jackson Lee, Texas, Chair; Karen Bass, California; Val Demings, Florida; Lucy McBath, Georgia; Madeleine Dean, Pennsylvania; Mary Gay Scanlon, Pennsylvania; Cori Bush, Missouri, Vice Chair; David Cicilline, Rhode Island; Ted Lieu, California; Lou Correa, California; Veronica Escobar, Texas; Steve Cohen, Tennessee	Andy Biggs, Arizona, Ranking Member; Steve Chabot, Ohio; Louie Gohmert, Texas; Greg Steube, Florida; Tom Tiffany, Wisconsin; Thomas Massie, Kentucky; Victoria Spartz, Indiana; Scott Fitzgerald, Wisconsin; Burgess Owens, Utah
Ex officio
Jerrold Nadler, New York	Jim Jordan, Ohio

=== 118th Congress ===
Majority	Minority
Andy Biggs, Arizona, Chair; Matt Gaetz, Florida; Tom Tiffany, Wisconsin; Troy Nehls, Texas; Barry Moore, Alabama; Laurel Lee, Florida; Russell Fry, South Carolina; Kevin Kiley, California	Sheila Jackson Lee, Texas, Ranking Member (until July 19, 2024); Lucy McBath, Georgia, Ranking Member (from July 30, 2024); Madeleine Dean, Pennsylvania; Cori Bush, Missouri; Steve Cohen, Tennessee
Ex officio
Jim Jordan, Ohio	Jerrold Nadler, New York

== See also ==
- United States House Committee on the Judiciary
