= Office of Consumer Counsel =

- OCC
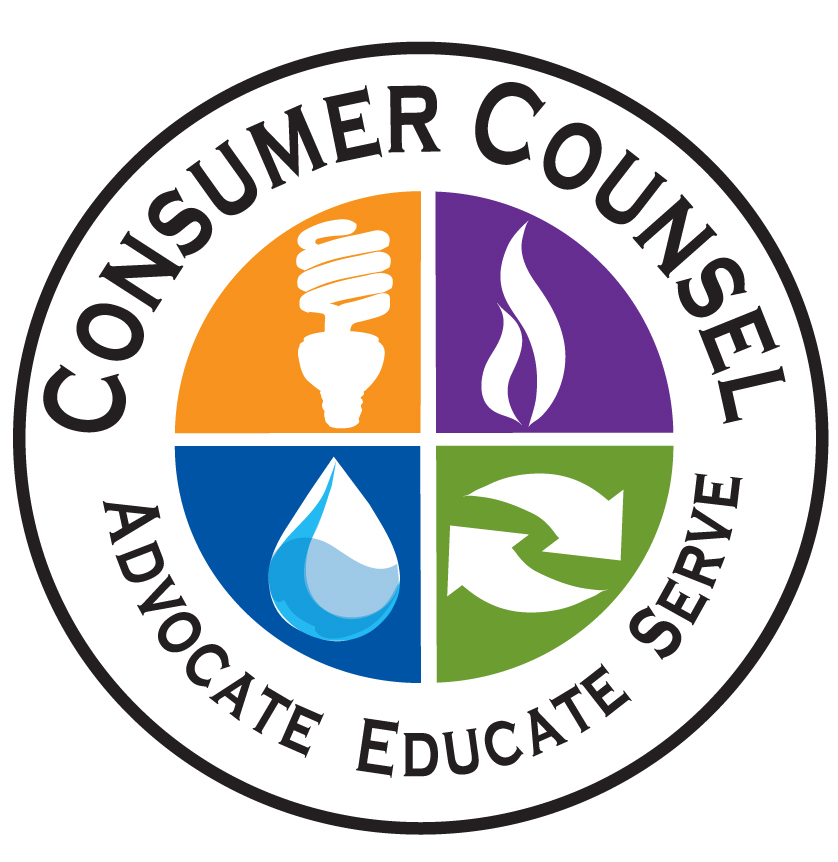
- Logo of the Connecticut Office of Consumer Counsel

- The Flag of Connecticut

Agency overview
- Formed: 1975
- Annual budget: $3.077 million(2021)(est)
- Agency executive: Claire E. Coleman, Consumer Counsel
- Website: https://www.ct.gov/occ/site/default.asp

The Office of Consumer Counsel (OCC) is an independent Connecticut state agency located in New Britain, Connecticut, that was created for the purpose of advocating for all utility ratepayers in Connecticut. Since its establishment in 1975 by Connecticut Public Act 75-486, the OCC has served as an independent voice for Connecticut's electric, natural gas, water, and telecommunications consumers through advocacy and consumer education.

== Scope of work ==
The OCC is authorized by Connecticut General Statutes section 16-2a to participate in any matter involving the interests of public utility consumers through administrative, judicial, or other forums. Primarily, OCC advocates before the Connecticut Public Utilities Regulatory Authority (PURA) which is an administrative forum regulating the rates and services of Connecticut's public utilities, and before the Connecticut Siting Council (CSC) when its dockets affect electric utility ratepayers. Where appropriate, the OCC appeals administrative decisions of PURA or CSC to court in order to secure a consumer-favorable outcome. In those forums and others, OCC's consumer-focused positions may align with those of other Connecticut governmental agencies such as the Attorney General's Office (AG) and/or private non-profit groups such as the Connecticut Industrial Energy Consumers (CIEC) and the AARP.

== Membership and affiliations ==
At the national level, OCC represents Connecticut utility ratepayer interests through the National Association of State Utility Consumer Advocates (NASUCA), which is an association of 44 consumer advocates in 40 states. Through Federal Energy Regulatory Commission (FERC) proceedings, OCC monitors issues related to maintaining the reliability of the electric grid, negotiating Reliability Must Run (RMR) contracts, and testifying before the FERC on whole market design, the effects of electric pricing, transmission proposals and other policies concerning utility ratepayers. As a member of the New England Power Pool (NEPOOL), the OCC represents Connecticut electricity consumers on a regional and national basis at NEPOOL meetings. On a state and local level, OCC represents Connecticut utility consumers through board membership on the Connecticut Energy Advisory Board (CEAB), the Connecticut Energy Efficiency Board (EEB), the Connecticut Economic Resource Center (CERC), and the Connecticut Low-Income Energy Advisory Board (LIEAB). Each year OCC engages with legislators during legislative session about proposed legislation, it coordinates with other groups reflecting similar positions, and testifies at legislative hearings. Due to its subject matter expertise on utility ratepayers, the OCC is routinely consulted by state legislators, such as the members of the General Assembly's Energy and Technology Committee, concerning the impact of energy policies which may require the OCC to provide written or oral testimony.

== Staff resources ==
The OCC consists of attorneys, accountants, financial analysts and support staff. As of 2022, OCC has 14 employee positions. In addition, the Consumer Counsel may hire expert witnesses to assist with the preparation of an advocacy matter. Utility customers of regulated Connecticut public utilities and customers of qualifying telephone companies, competitive electric suppliers, and video services companies that do business in Connecticut pay for both OCC's and PURA's expenses.

== Consumer counsel ==
The consumer counsel is appointed by the governor of Connecticut, and appears before the Executive Nominations Committee of the Connecticut General Assembly for final confirmation by either house of the state legislature. The consumer counsel serves for a 5-year term of office. Following her appointment by Governor Lamont, the current Consumer Counsel Claire E. Coleman was confirmed by the Connecticut legislature to serve a five-year term in February of 2022. A graduate of Cornell University and Northwestern University School of Law, Coleman worked as an energy attorney at Save the Sound (formerly Connecticut Fund for the Environment), and served as counsel to the U.S. House of Representatives Oversight and Government Reform Committee, where she conducted investigations into both private business practices and government programs and regulations, and prepared members of Congress for hearings on many areas of government policy and practice. She also worked as a litigation associate at Wiggin and Dana LLP in New Haven and Sullivan and Cromwell LLP in New York, and served as law clerk to the Honorable Ellen Bree Burns, United States District Judge for the District of Connecticut. Prior to her appointment to the OCC, Coleman served as the Undersecretary for Legal Affairs at the Connecticut Office of Policy and Management, where she provided legal and policy advice related to the formulation and implementation of the budget and public policy for the state. In this role, the Connecticut Conference of Municipalities honored Coleman as a Municipal Champion for her work on emergency COVID-19 pandemic executive orders that supported the efforts of local governments to respond to and govern during the pandemic. Coleman began serving as the Interim Consumer Counsel on December 3, 2021 and was confirmed by the Connecticut General Assembly during the regular legislative session in February 2022.

Consumer Counsels	Years of service
Claire E. Coleman	2021–Present
Richard E. Sobolewski (Acting)	2019–2021
Elin Swanson Katz	2011–2019
Mary J. Healey	2001–2011
Guy R. Mazza	1997–2001
John F. Merchant	1992–1996
Eugene M. Koss	1990–1991
James F. Meehan	1986–1989
Barry S. Zitser	1978–1985
David Silverstone	1975–1977
