= Liz Linehan =

American politician

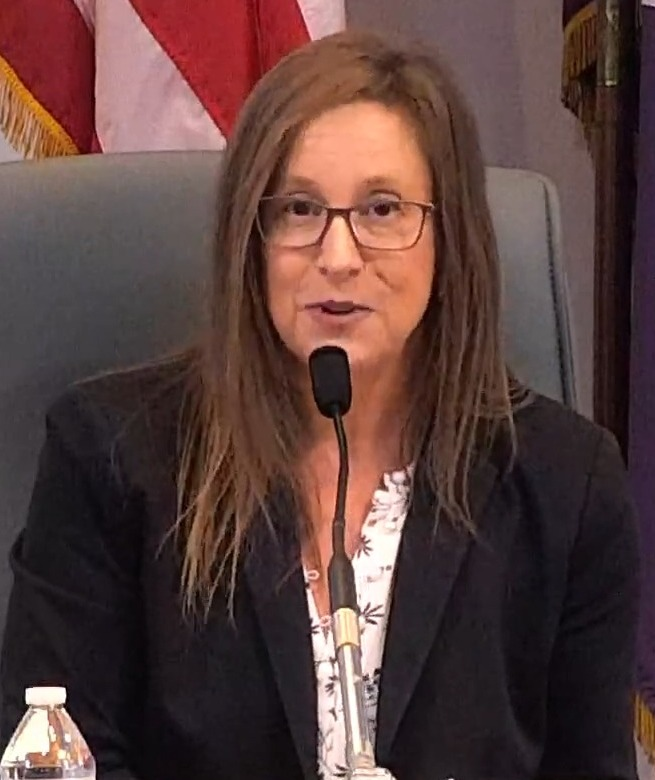
- Linehan in 2022

Member of the Connecticut House of Representatives from the 103rd district
- Incumbent
- Assumed office 2017
- Preceded by: Al Adinolfi

Personal details
- Born: 1974 (age 51–52) Cheshire, Connecticut, U.S.
- Party: Democratic
- Education: Central Connecticut State University (BA)
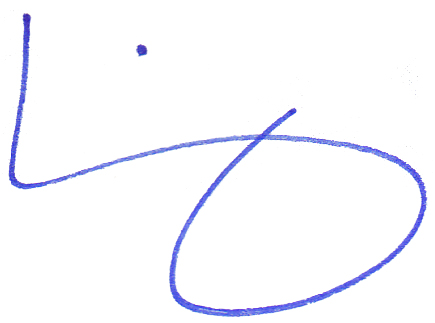
- Signature

Liz Linehan (born 1974) is an American politician serving as a member of the Connecticut House of Representatives from the 103rd district. She assumed office in 2017.

== Early life and education ==
Linehan was born and raised in Cheshire, Connecticut. She earned a Bachelor of Arts degree in communications from Central Connecticut State University.

== Career ==
Prior to entering politics, Linehan worked as a morning radio show producer and marketing professional. Linehan also served as a member of the Cheshire Town Council. She was elected to the Connecticut House of Representatives in 2016 and assumed office in 2017. Her district encompasses parts of Cheshire, Wallingford, and Southington.

During the 2017 legislative session, Linehan served as vice chair of the House Veterans' Affairs. From 2019 to 2024, she served as co-chair of the House Children Committee. Linehan introduced and helped pass a bill that trained police in communicating with autistic children in 2017. She also created the legislation for autistic drivers now known as the blue envelope program, in 2019.

Linehan created the Student-Manufacturer Connection Fair within the 103rd district.

Dan Drew chose Linehan to serve as his running mate for his campaign for governor, but he later withdrew from the race. Linehand's campaign for Lieutenant Governor with Drew lasted from September 2017 to January 2018.

A constituent of Linehan filed a restraining order against her due to Linehan confronting her in 2022. . Linehan contested the allegations in court and a judge denied the restrianting order. In 2024, Linehan became left her co-chair position to become a deputy speaker. During the 2025-2026 session, Linehan joined the Executive and Legislative Nominations Committee, and she left the Public Health Committee and Children Committee.
