= Victims of Trafficking and Violence Protection Act of 2000 =

United States federal criminal legislation

- Other short titles: William Wilberforce Trafficking Victims Protection Reauthorization Act
- Long title: An Act to combat trafficking in persons, especially into the sex trade, slavery, and involuntary servitude, to reauthorize certain Federal programs to prevent violence against women, and for other purposes.
- Nicknames: Trafficking Victims Protection Act
- Enacted by: the 106th United States Congress
- Effective: October 28, 2000

Citations
- Public law: Pub. L. 106–386 (text) (PDF)

Codification
- Acts amended: 2003, 2006, 2008, 2023

Legislative history
- Introduced in the House as H.R.3244 by Chris Smith (R–NJ) on November 8, 1999; Passed the House on May 9, 2000 (Voice Vote); Passed the Senate on July 27, 2000 (Unanimous consent); Signed into law by President Bill Clinton on October 28, 2000

Major amendments
- Human Trafficking Prevention Act of 2022

The Victims of Trafficking and Violence Protection Act of 2000 (TVPA) is a federal statute enacted in 2000 by the 106th United States Congress and signed into law by President Clinton. The law was later reauthorized by Congresses during the tenure of Presidents Bush, Obama, Trump, and Biden. In addition to its applicability to citizens, it authorizes protections for undocumented immigrants who are victims of severe forms of trafficking and violence.

In January 2023, the Trafficking Victims Protection Reauthorization Act of 2022 (TVPRA), was enacted as Pub. L. 117-348 (22 U.S.C. 7101 et seq.).

== History ==
The Trafficking Victims Protection Act was renewed in 2003, 2006, and 2008 (when it was renamed the William Wilberforce Trafficking Victims Protection Reauthorization Act of 2008). The law lapsed in 2011. In 2013, the entirety of the Trafficking Victims Protection Reauthorization Act was attached as an amendment to the Violence Against Women Act (VAWA) and passed. There are two stipulations an applicant has to meet in order to receive the benefits of the T-Visa. First, a victim of trafficking must prove/admit to being a victim of a severe form of trafficking, and second, must be a part of the prosecution of his or her trafficker. This law does not apply to immigrants seeking admission to the United States for other immigration purposes.

Pub. L. 115–93 (text) (PDF) reauthorized the TVPA in 2018, as part of the Trafficking Victims Protection Act of 2017.

Since the law requires the applicant to become part of the prosecution of his or her trafficker, trafficked persons may be fearful of retaliation upon the self or the family and thus serves as a major deterrent to individuals even considering application. The law contains provisions for the protection of those who are categorized as victims of human trafficking, primarily for sex, smuggling, and forced labor forms of exploitation.

The TVPA allowed for the establishment of the Department of State's Office to Monitor and Combat Trafficking in Persons, which coordinates with foreign governments to protect trafficking victims, prevent trafficking, and prosecute traffickers.

== Amendments ==
=== Proposed ===
- Justice for Victims of Trafficking Act of 2014 - this bill established in the Treasury the Domestic Trafficking Victims' Fund into which such penalties shall be deposited and which shall be used in FY2015-FY2019 to award grants or enhance victims' programming under the Trafficking Victims Protection Act of 2000, the Trafficking Victims Protection Reauthorization Act of 2005, and the Victims of Child Abuse Act of 1990. The bill also amended the Trafficking Victims Protection Act of 2000 to direct the United States Secretary of Health and Human Services (HHS) to make a determination, based on credible evidence, that a covered individual (i.e., a U.S. citizen or a permanent resident) has been a victim of a severe form of trafficking. It passed the House on May 20, 2014 under a suspension of the rules.
- Human Trafficking Prevention Act - this bill required regular training and briefings for some federal government personnel to raise awareness of human trafficking and help employees spot cases of it.

== Determinations ==
On September 27, 2016, President Barack Obama made a Presidential determination on Foreign Governments' Efforts Regarding Trafficking in Persons consistent with section 110 of the Trafficking Victims Protection Act of 2000 (22 U.S.C. § 7107).

On September 30, 2017, President Donald Trump made a Presidential determination under 22 U.S.C. § 7107 (Respect to the Efforts of Foreign Governments Regarding Trafficking in Persons).

== Notable civil cases ==
TVPRA has been used to establish civil liability for U.S. corporations that benefit from forced labor in their supply chains.

Ratha v. Phatthana Seafood Co. (2022). In 2016, Cambodian seafood workers sued a U.S. importer for benefiting from forced labor on Thai fishing vessels, alleging the importer knowingly purchased slave-caught fish, but the goods were never imported to the U.S. In 2022, the U.S. Court of Appeals for the Ninth Circuit affirmed the lower court's dismissal, ruling that civil liability requires actual benefit from completed trafficking acts, not attempts. The U.S. Congress amended the TVPRA through the Abolish Trafficking Reauthorization Act (ATRA), and expanded liability to include those who "attempt or conspire to benefit" from the violations. In March 2025, the Ninth Circuit issued an order for the case to be reheard en banc.

Doe v. Apple Inc. (2024). Cobalt miners from the Democratic Republic of Congo sued Apple, Alphabet, Microsoft, Dell, and Tesla for knowingly benefiting from child/forced labor in cobalt mining supply chains. In 2024, the U.S. Court of Appeals for the District of Columbia Circuit affirmed the lower court's dismissal on extraterritoriality grounds and held that TVPRA's civil remedy (18 U.S.C. § 1595) does not extend abroad unless tied to U.S.-based conduct.

== See also ==
- Bureau of International Labor Affairs
- Child Soldiers Prevention Act
- Human trafficking in the United States
- Office to Monitor and Combat Trafficking in Persons
- United States Department of State
- Thirteenth Amendment to the United States Constitution
- Headley v. Church of Scientology International
