= Public interest =

"Common well-being" or "general welfare"

In social science and economics, public interest is "the welfare or well-being of the general public" and society.

While it has earlier philosophical roots and is considered to be at the core of democratic theories of government, often paired with two other concepts, convenience and necessity, it first became explicitly integrated into governance instruments in the early part of the 20th century.

The public interest was rapidly adopted and popularised by human rights lawyers in the 1960s and has since been incorporated into other fields such as journalism and technology.

== Overview ==
Economist Lok Sang Ho, in his Public Policy and the Public Interest, argues that the public interest must be assessed impartially and, therefore, defines the public interest as the "ex ante welfare of the representative individual". Under a thought experiment, by assuming that there is an equal chance for one to be anyone in society and, thus, could benefit or suffer from a change, the public interest is by definition enhanced whenever that change is preferred to the status quo ex ante. This approach is "ex ante", in the sense that the change is not evaluated after the fact but assessed before the fact without knowing whether one would actually benefit or suffer from it.

This approach follows the "veil of ignorance" approach, which was first proposed by John Harsanyi but popularized by John Rawls in his 1971 Theory of Justice. Historically, however, the approach can be traced to John Stuart Mill, who, in his letter to George Grote, explained that "human happiness, even one's own, is in general more successfully pursued by acting on general rules, than by measuring the consequences of each act; and this is still more the case with the general happiness, since any other plan would not only leave everybody uncertain what to expect, but would involve perpetual quarrelling..."

This approach is attractive because only under impartiality can there be the possibility of consensus. This of course is still conditional: i.e., conditional on everybody doing the same thought experiment as Rawls suggested. Other than this, if everybody considers his own private interests from his point of view, then social welfare will have to be defined in an ex post fashion by summing up or otherwise defined over individually rated welfares or social states that would come about because of different social choices. This is the approach of social welfare functions. Whether these functions are based on individually ranked social states or individual cardinal utilities, the absence of consensus over social welfare functions is unavoidable.

The Institute of Chartered Accountants in England and Wales argues that applying a detailed definition is likely to result in unintended consequences, in Acting in the Public Interest (2012). Instead, each circumstance needs to be assessed based on criteria such as the relevant public, wants, and constraints. The key to assessing any public interest decision is transparency of the decision-making process, including balancing competing interests.

The need to consider the circumstances carefully in all dimensions is well taken, as is the need for transparency of the standards and procedures for policy making. It needs to be noted that in practice adversarial politics means that "balancing competing interests" amounts to politicians navigating through the web of divergent interests to procure their best political interests. The outcome will be a contest of political clout among different competing interests. Whether this promotes the public interest remains controversial.

== Governments ==
=== US ===
Public interest has been considered as the core of "democratic theories of government” and often paired with two other concepts, "convenience" and "necessity". In the United States, public interest, convenience and necessity appeared for the first time in the Transportation Act of 1920 and also appeared in the Radio Act of 1927. After that, these three concepts became critical criteria for making communication policies and solving some related disputes.

=== India ===
Indian constitution invokes the term "public interest" at nine places in its Articles 22 (6), 31A (b) and 31A (c) of fundamental rights of people, 263, 302, Entries 52, 54 and 56 of union list and Entry 33 of the concurrent list. Article 282 says the revenues of the Union or a State may be spent for public purposes. When a scheme or project is taken up under public interest by the Union instead of a State, such scheme should be a popular demand of the nationwide public without any opposition from the directly affected stakeholders before the implementation of such scheme. Otherwise, it becomes a public purpose scheme that would serve greater part of society but some would suffer from the implementation of such scheme. In the absence of interpretation (Dos and don'ts) of the term "public interest" by the courts in India, these Articles are being misused by the union lawmakers to usurp the constitutional powers of the state governments and the rights of people in contrast to the meaning of "public interest".

Indian constitution permits expenditure by state and union governments under heads public purpose per Article 282, national interest per Article 249 and public interest. The encompassing law is Article 38 of Directive Principles of State Policy for all activities of the State (legislative and executive wings of Union and states) which mandates to strive for promoting the welfare of the people by securing and protecting a social order in which justice, social, economic and political, shall inform all the institutions of the national life. When a Public Interest is felt by the Parliament, it shall be included in the Part IV of the constitution by issuing an amendment to the constitution per Article 368 procedure. As used in the constitution, public interest and national interest are sub groups of public purpose. For the Parliament to legislate with respect to a matter in the State List, public interest is applicable for matters of long duration whereas national interest is of short duration matters (less than six months).

== Public interest and public interest-related activities in other academic fields ==
A number of academic fields engage in activities that are connected to and support the goals of the public interest.

=== Engineering ===
Public interest engineering is centered around the development of human and environmentally sustainable structures and system. Public interest design focuses on collaborative efforts to incorporate the public good in designing products, structures, and systems. The Code of Ethics for Engineers from the National Society of Professional Engineers states "Engineers shall at all times strive to serve the public interest."

=== Government ===
e-Government (also known as digital government or open government) is the use of digital technologies to provide important governmental services to people and communities. The U.S. federal government has multiple initiatives involving using technology to support public interest and improved government. The United States Digital Service offers technology support to agencies of the federal government. The U.S. Digital Corps offers internships designed to help build a federal government workforce skilled in using technology to address local, state, national, and global needs. TechCongress places individuals with technology skills and backgrounds as technology policy advisers to Members of Congress. The 21st Century Integrated Digital Experience Act, passed in 2018, aims to improve how the public interacts with information on federal government websites. Open government resources are available from the federal government's Office of Personnel Management (OPM) in the Office of Inspector General.

=== History ===
Public history is an area in the field of history where professional and non-professional researchers seek to provide historical information to people and communities. Technology provides public historians with multiple ways to conduct and share their research. The New England Journal of History, an online publication housed at Dean College in Franklin, Massachusetts, has an entire section designed to publish the work of community members who use video cameras to record history in their backyards.

=== Journalism ===
Public interest journalism involves researching and reporting on issues of interest and relevance to people and communities. According to the Charitable Journalism Project, it is "journalism that serves the interests of the public." The Public Interest Journalism Initiative, established in Melbourne, Australia and in partnership with the University of Melbourne, is a news and public policy organization.

In 2023, The Center for Cooperative Media at Montclair State University, in partnership with the Rita Allen Foundation announced plans to fund cross-field civic science journalism collaborations intended to build awareness of civic science issues and potential solutions.

Public interest journalism is not present as a concept in all societies, but is growing in use - though between societies where the term is used, definitions vary.

=== Law ===
Public interest law is rooted in the commitment that members of the legal profession have to being an advocate for all members of society, especially those who lack the financial resources to advocate for themselves in the legal and justice system. Free legal aid for those who cannot afford representation is a well-known form of public interest law in the United States. Prior to the existence of public interest law, the legal needs and advocacy for disadvantaged or vulnerable populations could only be served only through legal aid organizations like the American Civil Liberties Union (ACLU) and the National Association for the Advancement of Colored People (NAACP)'s Legal Defense and Educational Fund (LDF). The efforts of philanthropic entities like the Ford Foundation facilitated the development of field-building publications, the establishment of public interest law organizations and support for educational and professional development opportunities. The impact of these efforts led to the legal aid clinic programs at Harvard University led by law professor Jeanne Charn and at UC Berkeley School of Law legal clinics led by law professor Jeffrey Selbin as well as the founding of the Council on Legal Education for Professional Responsibility.

=== Science ===
Citizen science involves efforts by everyday, non-professional community members to contribute to and support the development of scientific information in a variety of fields. Eclipse Soundscapes, a NASA-funded citizen science project, is designed to involve non-scientists in the study of how eclipses affect people and environments. Another example of citizen science that involves using technology for the public interest: the Great Backyard Bird Count initiative, which was started in 1998, encourages volunteers to observe birds in their communities and log their findings into the eBird database, begins its 25th year today. Around 385,000 people from 192 countries participated in the four-day program in 2022, and the data is used by researchers to track bird species and direct conservation efforts.

=== Technology ===
Public interest technology (PIT) shares origins with the field of science, technology, and society (STS), which according to Stanford University, started before World War II and was formalized in the 1980s and combines history, anthropology, sociology, economics, ethics, and other approaches to the relations between social contexts and the practices of science and engineering. Much like STS, public interest technology uses an interdisciplinary frame to posit questions about tech designed in service of the public interest emphasizing the importance of co-design and community engagement. The evolution of STS into public interest technology was in part due to what was parceived as still insufficient public engagement during the STS era, as evidenced in, for example, codes of ethics. PIT promotes "the development and realization of socially responsible solutions to the challenges in a technology-driven world." It has been characterized as people-centered problem solving. PIT emerged as a field of academic research and action in higher education in 2019 with the establishment of the Public Interest Technology University Network (PIT-UN) by New America.

== See also ==
- Cause lawyering
- Common good
- Condorcet paradox
- General will
- National interest
- Pareto optimality
- Public interest technology
- Public opinion
- Radio Act of 1927
- Telecommunications Act of 1996
- Self-interest
- Social Credit System
- Social Engineering
- Software in the Public Interest
- Public interest accounting
