= Public interest technology =

Public interest technology (PIT or PiTech) is an approach to the use of technology to promote "the development and realization of socially responsible solutions to the challenges in a technology-driven world." It has been characterized as "people-centered problem solving." PIT emerged as a field of academic research and action in higher education in 2019 with the establishment of the Public Interest Technology University Network (PIT-UN) by New America.

PIT applies technological expertise in an effort to advance the public interest and promote the public good. These goals are centered around the intentional inclusion of a collective need for justice, dignity and autonomy. PIT strives to encourage interoperability between technology, policy and society. PIT puts people at the center of policy making and improving community-driven problem-solving through the use of design, data and delivery skills and draws from technical fields like computer science, data science, and engineering, along with law, public policy, movement-building, philosophy, the social sciences, the arts and humanities, and more. PIT aims to improve "user experience" through the assessment of practices in an "iterative manner continuously learning, improving, and aiming to deliver better outcomes to the public."

The PIT ecosystem requires the cultivation of partnerships with a range of organizations, advocacy groups, policy makers, academic institutions, community groups and strategic partners. Most definitions of PIT emphasize that the development of these partnerships is critical and that the growth of the PIT ecosystem needs to be one that is inclusive, equitable, diverse, accessible, ethical and effective. In addition, while public interest technology can be developed and delivered by multinationals within an international business context, the emphasis is generally on the national or local context, such as the civic context.

== History ==
The general concept underlying PIT can be traced back to the end of the 20th century. For instance, using technology for the broad public interest was part of Tim Berners-Lee's original vision for the World Wide Web (WWW). He recalled "my growing realization that there was a power in arranging ideas in an unconstrained, weblike way." The field of PIT proper emerged from a collaboration of educational institutions, nonprofit organizations and the investment of philanthropic entities like the Ford Foundation and the MacArthur Foundation. PIT drew on existing concerns over technology's use. For instance, in 2001 Harvard University's Data Privacy Lab, founded by Dr. Latanya Sweeney, established the Technology Science Research Collaboration Network to "engage a network of scholars and students across the country to explore and scientifically investigate the unforeseen consequences of technology."

In February 2015, the NetGain Partnership brought together leaders in government, philanthropy, business, and the tech world to begin strategizing around the shared principles of building a stronger digital society focused on social change and progress. This gathering included discussions led by Ethan Zuckerman on the dangers of the WWW, Emily Bell on the shifting landscape of the news media landscape, Alicia Garza on the role of technology in activism and the dangers of increased surveillance, and Sunil Abraham on the digital divide and barriers to accessing technology from a global perspective.

This led to the investment in 2015 of over $18 million, in programs and initiatives aimed at a year long exploration of public interest technology. The initial grants were awarded to the Open Technology Institute of New America (known at the time as the New America Foundation), centering on open-source innovations and the development of open technology as central to the definition of PIT. A grant provided by New America to TechCongress assisted with the creation of the TechCongress Congressional Innovation Fellowship program, which aims to promote better technology policy making and leadership, another important tenet in the definition of PIT.

Professional pathways into public interest technology began with projects from Code for America. New Venture Fund's Media Democracy Fund created a university fellowship program to encourage students' interest in technology and public policy. The success of these projects set the stage for the development of the Public Interest Technology University Network in 2019.

Examples of technology investigated by PIT researchers include AI, council information systems, drones, government form submission systems, and platforms in cities.

=== Origin of the term and definition ===
Public interest technology (PIT) is an umbrella term used to describe an emergent discipline consisting of skilled technologists responsible for guaranteeing that all new technology is manufactured, disseminated, and enjoyed responsibly. One definition is that "Public interest technology refers to the study and application of technology expertise to advance the public interest/generate public benefits/promote the public good," while another states that it is "the application of design, data, and delivery to advance the public interest and promote the public good in the digital age." The term "public interest technology" was chosen because it contained an allusion to "public interest law" another field that was generated through philanthropic impetus. Fashioned using a similar framework to that of public interest law, PIT is intended to ensure that technology is created and shared in an inclusive and accountable way that protects or improves the lives of all people. Consequently, public interest technologists are "technology practitioners who focus on social justice, the common good, and/or the public interest."

== Career paths ==
Public interest technologists are people from a variety of disciplines who share a passion, perspective or expertise related to the conception, governance and presentation of technology. There is not currently a typical career-path for individuals interested in working in public interest, as a technologist. Public interest technologists may be, but are certainly not limited to, professionals from the following vocations: artists, designers, engineers, lawyers, lobbyists, policy makers, scientists.

== Futurism ==
Futurism relates closely to the development of public interest technology. Public interest technology is situated at the intersection of technological development and societal impact. The development of public interest technology has benefited from the application of systems thinking models. Futurism models allow for non-linear development of solutions to complex problems, a critical public interest technology lens. As Jenny Toomey and Latanya Sweeney point out: "As technology expands its reach everywhere, to meet the challenges of our day, we need the vision of public interest tech everywhere as well, in every sector, and through the many lenses it takes, be it civic tech, community tech, tech for good." A futurism frame allows for the building of collaborations across sectors that historically have not interacted: scientists, community organizers, developers, artists, designers, writers, social theorists and activists. As Chuck Robbins and Darren Walker state:"By fostering a new vanguard of cross-disciplinary experts to work across sectors and empowering them with the resources they need to succeed, we can bridge the gaps between the public interest and technology to power a more just and inclusive future for all."

== See also ==
- Citizen science
- Civic technology
- Sociotechnology
- PIT-UN
