= IPAA =

IPAA can refer to:

- Ileal Pouch-Anal Anastomosis, an alternative name for ileo-anal pouch
- Independent Petroleum Association of America
- Institute of Public Administration Australia
- Intellectual Property Attache Act
- International Peace Arch Association, a non-profit association involved with the maintenance of Peace Arch Park
