= Downhill Battle =

American non-profit organization

Downhill Battle is a non-profit organization based in Worcester, Massachusetts. It was founded by Nicholas Reville, Holmes Wilson, and Tiffiniy Cheng in August 2003.

Downhill Battle is known for its argument that the four major recording labels have an oligopoly that is bad for both musicians and music culture. It also believes that filesharing can strengthen the role of independent record labels in the music industry, and they help produce software that helps independent artists and journalists reach a wider audience. The group supports what they call "participatory culture" where everyone is a part of creating and sharing art and music.

Downhill Battle are also known for their projects such as Grey Tuesday, Eyes on the Screen, Banned Music, Peer-to-Peer Legal Defense Fund, and more. Downhill Battle made Spin Magazine's Top 100 moments that rocked the world at #81 for the moment when Downhill Battle launched Grey Tuesday and the Grey Album went viral.

The Downhill Battle team also founded the Participatory Culture Foundation (PCF) and Fight for the Future, a freedom of speech and privacy advocacy organization. PCF also has a set of Participatory Politics projects, including a politics news site and a messageboard service that has been a gathering space for self-organizing.

Downhillbattle.org was down for an extended period of time. It was reactivated on October 16, 2011.

== Software ==
- Blog Torrent, a BitTorrent client.
- Local Ink, first public tool for sending letters to local papers by zipcode with a user interface.
- Conversate, a pre-Facebook website for ad hoc sharing and discussion of links, media, email messages, anything, etc. with any grouping of friends and acquaintances.
