= COICA =

COICA may refer to:

- Coordinator of Indigenous Organizations of the Amazon River Basin, non-governmental organization based in Peru that coordinates national Amazonian indigenous organizations
- Combating Online Infringement and Counterfeits Act, failed 2010 legislation in the United States Senate that would have allowed the blocking the domain names of web sites accused of piracy
