= Internet Slowdown Day =

2014 online protest

A "spinning wheel of death" used to promote Internet Slowdown Day

Internet Slowdown Day, part of the "Battle for the Net" initiative, was a series of protests against the repeal of net neutrality laws coordinated by websites and advocacy groups in the United States occurring on September 10, 2014. The official site explains: "On September 10th, sites across the web will display an alert with a symbolic 'loading' symbol (the proverbial 'spinning wheel of death') and promote a call to action for users to push comments to the FCC, Congress, and the White House."

== Background ==
Internet Slowdown Day was held to raise public awareness and support for net neutrality, the principle that all internet traffic should be treated equally without discrimination or favoritism. This means that internet service providers (ISPs) can't block or prioritize certain websites simply because of their content or publisher.

Many ISPs endorse eliminating net neutrality, arguing that net neutrality laws are unnecessary and that ISPs should have more control over their own networks. ISPs also argue that net neutrality increases consumer costs while reducing internet access due to reduced investment in internet services. ISPs claim that net neutrality will prevent them from charging large companies extra fees for the bandwidth they use, placing the costs of building the additional bandwidth capacity onto consumers.

Supporters of net neutrality worry that eliminating net neutrality would threaten free speech on the internet, by allowing ISPs to block access to any website they want. Proponents of net neutrality also argue that it protects consumers by preventing ISPs from separating Internet traffic into a "fast lane" (for those companies who can afford to pay to have their content delivered at premium speeds) and a "slow lane" (for everyone else's websites).

In April 2014, FCC Chairman Tom Wheeler proposed new rules which would allow ISPs to offer "paid prioritization" to companies, allowing them to purchase faster internet speeds. Internet Slowdown Day organizer Fight for the Future argued that the proposed rules would allow ISPs "to create a two-tiered Internet, with slow lanes (for most of us) and fast lanes (for wealthy corporations that are willing to pay fees in exchange for fast service)." The organization also argued that the rules would hand power to Internet service providers and allow them to "discriminate against online content and applications."

== Protest on September 10, 2014 ("Internet Slowdown Day") ==
Contrary to what the name suggests, Internet Slowdown Day didn't actually slow down the Internet or any of the websites involved. Instead, participating websites displayed the "loading" icon to simulate what the Internet would look like if net neutrality laws were repealed and if ISPs were allowed to prioritize certain websites over others. Participating websites also displayed messages explaining the importance of net neutrality and that "'slow lanes' were about to be imposed on parts of the Internet." Site visitors were then directed to click on the "loading" icon which brought them directly to the FCC page, allowing them to submit complaints in favor of net neutrality.

== Impact of Internet Slowdown Day ==
Three million comments were sent to the FCC after Internet Slowdown Day, and an overwhelming majority showed strong public support for net neutrality. FCC Chairman Tom Wheeler also said he personally doesn't like "the idea that the Internet could be divided into haves and have-nots, and I will to work to make sure that does not happen."

In February 2015, the FCC voted 3-2 to reclassify the Internet as a public utility and impose rules that prevent ISPs from restricting access to certain websites and selling higher internet speeds to their clients.

Internet Slowdown Day was compared to the January 18, 2012 "Internet Blackout Day," where some of the most popular websites, including Reddit and Wikipedia, went "dark" to protest against SOPA and PIPA, two laws that would give authorities greater powers to shut down websites accused of copyright infringement. The Internet Blackout Day protests generated significant public awareness and backlash which contributed to the eventual withdrawal of the legislation. According to the protesters, the proposed legislation endangered free speech on the Internet.

== Participants ==
Participants of Internet Slowdown Day included streaming sites Netflix and Vimeo, image hosting sites Imgur and Tumblr, new sites Digg and Reddit, as well as other popular sites such as Automattic, Dwolla, Etsy, Foursquare, Grooveshark, I Can Has Cheezburger?, Kickstarter, Meetup, Mozilla, Namecheap, Twitter, Upworthy, Urban Dictionary, and Wikia. At least 76 different websites took part in the protest.

This day forced a lot of prominent names like Mark Zuckerberg and Tim Berners-Lee to call people to action to save Net Neutrality.

Internet Slowdown Day was organized by Demand Progress, Engine Advocacy, Fight for the Future and Free Press. Evan Greer, Campaign Director for Fight for the Future, told CBS News "If we lose net neutrality, we can expect the Internet to become more like Cable TV, where a small group of corporations get to choose which content most people see, and which content gets relegated to the 'slow lane.'" Greer also reiterated that net neutrality is essential to keeping the Internet a "level playing field."

Other activist organizations that participated in Internet Slowdown Day include:

- American Civil Liberties Union
- Common Cause
- Center for Media Justice
- ColorOfChange
- DailyKos
- Democracy for America
- Democrats.com
- Electronic Frontier Foundation
- Fight for the Future, protest co-organizer
- Free Press Action Fund
- Future of Music Coalition
- Greenpeace USA
- Harry Potter Alliance
- Media Alliance
- Media Mobilizing Project
- MoveOn
- National Hispanic Media Coalition
- OpenMedia
- Popular Resistance
- Presente.org
- Progressive Change Campaign Committee
- Progressives United
- Other 98%
- RootsAction
- Rootstrikers
- Sierra Club
- SumOfUs
- Voqal
- Women, Action & the Media
- Writers Guild of America, East
- Writers Guild of America, West
