= Digital rights =

Type of human and legal rights

Digital rights are the human rights and legal rights that enable individuals to access, use, create, and publish digital media, as well as to access and use computers, other electronic devices, and telecommunications networks. The concept is particularly related to the protection and realization of existing rights, such as the right to privacy and freedom of expression, in the context of digital technologies, particularly the Internet. The laws of several countries recognize a right to Internet access. Digital rights are often discussed in relation to issues such as online privacy, freedom of expression, access to information, and the regulation of digital technologies by states and private actors.

== Human rights and the Internet ==
A number of human rights have been particularly relevant in relation to the Internet. These include freedom of expression, privacy, and freedom of association.

=== APC Internet Rights Charter (2001) ===
The APC Internet Rights Charter was established by the Association for Progressive Communications (APC) during 2001. The APC states that "the ability to share information and communicate freely using the internet is vital to the realization of human rights as enshrined in the Universal Declaration of Human Rights, the International Covenant on Economic, Social and Cultural Rights, the International Covenant on Civil and Political Rights and the Convention on the Elimination of All Forms of Discrimination against Women." The APC Internet Rights Charter is an early example of a so-called Internet bill of rights, an important element of digital constitutionalism.

=== World Summit on the Information Society (WSIS) (2003-2004) ===
The WSIS Declaration of Principles was adopted during 2003 reaffirming human rights:

We reaffirm the universality, indivisibility, interdependence and interrelation of all human rights and fundamental freedoms, including the right to development, as enshrined in the Vienna Declaration. We also reaffirm that democracy, sustainable development, and respect for human rights and fundamental freedoms as well as good governance at all levels are interdependent and mutually reinforcing. We further resolve to strengthen the rule of law in international as in national affairs.

The WSIS Declaration also makes specific reference to the importance of the right to freedom of expression in the "Information Society" in stating:

We reaffirm, as an essential foundation of the Information Society, and as outlined in Article 19 of the Universal Declaration of Human Rights, that everyone has the right to freedom of opinion and expression; that this right includes freedom to hold opinions without interference and to seek, receive and impart information and ideas through any media and regardless of frontiers. Communication is a fundamental social process, a basic human need and the foundation of all social organisation. It is central to the Information Society. Everyone, everywhere should have the opportunity to participate and no one should be excluded from the benefits of the Information Society offers.

The 2004 WSIS Declaration of Principles also acknowledged the need to prevent the use of information and technologies for criminal purposes, while respecting human rights.

=== Internet Bill of Rights and Charter on Internet Rights and Principles (2007-2010) ===
At the IGF in Hyderabad in 2008 a merger between the Dynamic Coalitions on Human Rights for the Internet and on Principles for the Internet led to the Dynamic Coalition on Internet Rights and Principles, which based on the APC Internet Rights Charter and the Universal Declaration of Human Rights elaborated the Charter of Human Rights and Principles for the Internet presented at the IGF in Vilnius in 2010, which since has been translated into several languages.

=== Global Network Initiative (2008) ===
On October 29, 2008, the Global Network Initiative (GNI) was founded upon its "Principles on Freedom of Expression and Privacy". The Initiative was launched in the 60th Anniversary year of the Universal Declaration of Human Rights (UDHR) and is based on internationally recognized laws and standards for human rights on freedom of expression and privacy set out in the UDHR, the International Covenant on Civil and Political Rights (ICCPR) and the International Covenant on Economic, Social and Cultural Rights (ICESCR).

=== United Nations Human Rights Council (2011-2012) ===
Some of the 88 recommendations made by the United Nations Special Rapporteur on the promotion and protection of the right to freedom of opinion and expression in a May 2011 report to the Human Rights Council of the United Nations General Assembly supported the argument that internet access itself is or should become a fundamental human right.

67. Unlike any other medium, the Internet enables individuals to seek, receive and impart information and ideas of all kinds instantaneously and inexpensively across national borders. By vastly expanding the capacity of individuals to enjoy their right to freedom of opinion and expression, which is an "enabler" of other human rights, the Internet boosts economic, social and political development, and contributes to the progress of humankind as a whole...
79. The Special Rapporteur calls upon all States to ensure that Internet access is maintained at all times, including during times of political unrest.

The United Nations Human Rights Council declared internet freedom a Human Right in 2012.

== Notable laws by place ==
Several countries and regional unions have laws addressing digital rights:

- Costa Rica: A 30 July 2010 ruling by the Supreme Court of Costa Rica gave the fundamental right of access to digital technologies, especially the Internet.
- Estonia: In 2000, the parliament launched a massive program to expand internet access to the countryside, arguing that it is essential for life in the 21st century.
- European Union: In 2023, adopted a Declaration on Digital Rights.
- Finland: By July 2010, every person in Finland was to have access to a one-megabit per second broadband connection, according to the Ministry of Transport and Communications. And by 2015, access to a 100 Mbit/s connection.
- France: In June 2009, the Constitutional Council, France's highest court, declared access to the Internet to be a basic human right in a strongly-worded decision that struck down portions of the HADOPI law, a law that would have tracked abusers and without judicial review and automatically cut off network access to those who continued to download illicit material after two warnings
- Greece: Article 5A of the Constitution of Greece states that all persons have the right to participate in the Information Society and that the state has an obligation to facilitate the production, exchange, diffusion, and access to electronically transmitted information.
- Spain: Starting in 2011, Telefónica, the former state monopoly that holds the country's "universal service" contract, has to guarantee to offer "reasonably" priced broadband of at least one megabyte per second throughout Spain.
- United States: The Electronic Frontier Foundation has criticized the United States government in 2012 for considering during the Megaupload seizure process that people lose property rights by storing data on a cloud computing service.

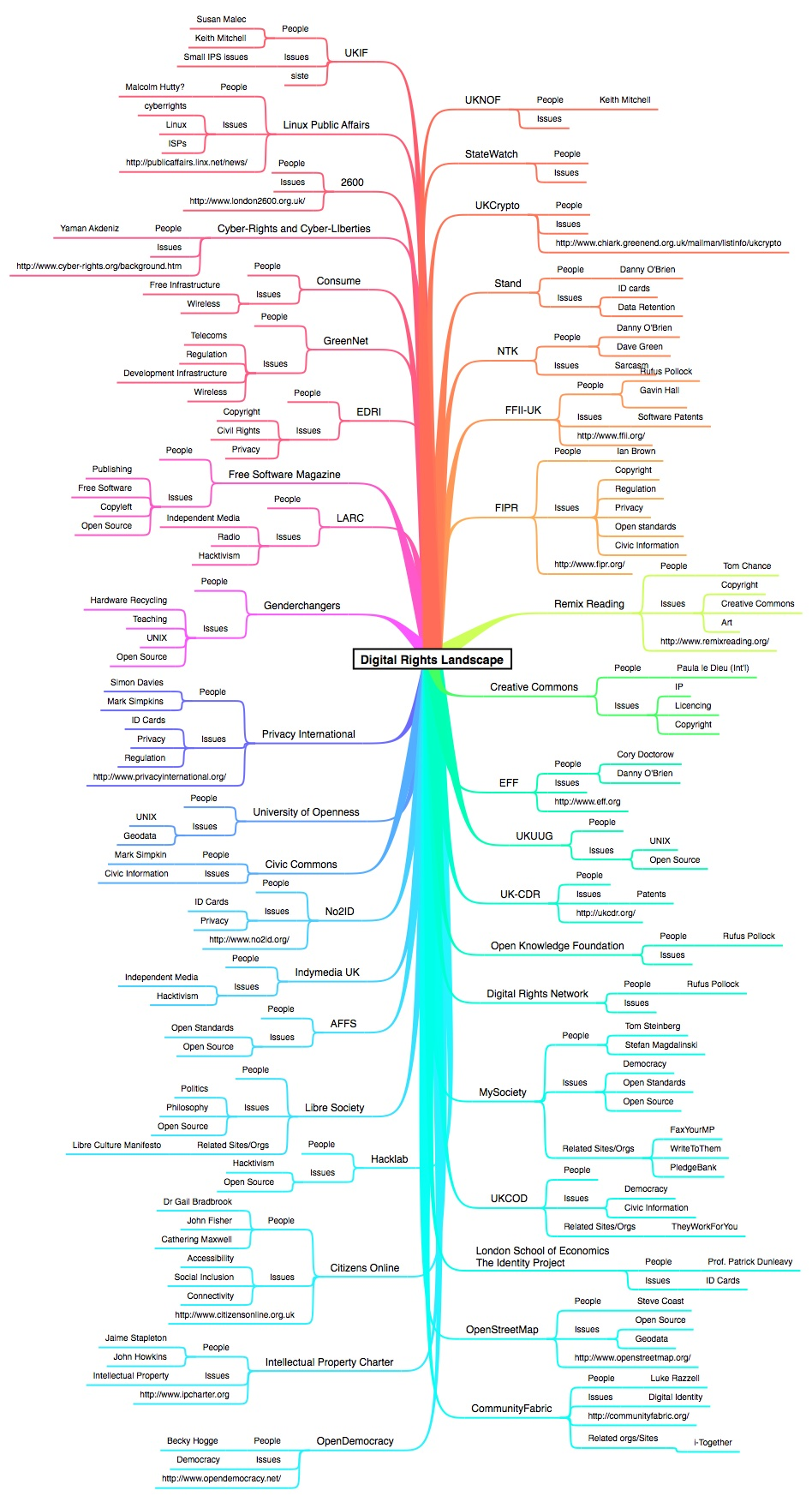
Digital rights landscape, 2005, by the Open Rights Group

== Surveys ==
=== BBC World Service global public opinion poll (2009-2010) ===
A poll of 27,973 adults in 26 countries, including 14,306 Internet users, was conducted for the BBC World Service by the international polling firm GlobeScan using telephone and in-person interviews between 30 November 2009 and 7 February 2010. GlobeScan Chairman Doug Miller interpreted the results as showing that people around the world see access to the internet as their fundamental right, a force for good, and most do not want governments to regulate it.

Findings from the poll include:

- Nearly four in five (78%) Internet users felt that the Internet had brought them greater freedom.
- Users in Europe and China were more supportive towards regulation of the internet by the government than those in South Korea or Nigeria.
- Opinion was evenly split between Internet users who felt that "the internet is a safe place to express my opinions" (48%) and those who disagreed (49%).
- The aspects of the Internet that cause the most concern include: fraud (32%), violent and explicit content (27%), threats to privacy (20%), state censorship of content (6%), and the extent of corporate presence (3%).
- Almost four in five Internet users and non-users around the world felt that access to the Internet was a fundamental right (50% strongly agreed, 29% somewhat agreed, 9% somewhat disagreed, 6% strongly disagreed, and 6% gave no opinion).

=== Internet Society's Global Internet User Survey (2012) ===
In July and August 2012 the Internet Society conducted online interviews of more than 10,000 Internet users in 20 countries, including questions on digital rights:

Question	No. of Responses	Responses
Access to the Internet should be considered a basic human right.	10,789	83% somewhat or strongly agree, 14% somewhat or strongly disagree, 3% don't know
Each individual country has the right to govern the Internet the way they see fit.	10,789	67% somewhat or strongly agree, 29% somewhat or strongly disagree, 4% don't know /not applicable
The Internet does more to help society than it does to hurt it.	10,789	83% somewhat or strongly agree, 13% somewhat or strongly disagree, 4% don't know / not applicable
Increased government control of the Internet would make me use the Internet less.	9,717	57% somewhat or strongly agree, 39% somewhat or strongly disagree, 5% don't know / not applicable
Increased government control of the Internet would increase the number of users.	9,717	40% somewhat or strongly agree, 52% somewhat or strongly disagree, 8% don't know / not applicable
Governments need to place a higher priority on expanding the Internet and its benefits in my country.	10,789	83% somewhat or strongly agree, 11% somewhat or strongly disagree, 5% don't know / not applicable
For the Internet to reach its full potential in my country people need to be able to access the Internet without data and content restrictions.	10,789	79% somewhat or strongly agree, 17% somewhat or strongly disagree, 4% don't know / not applicable

== Digital rights advocacy groups ==
- AccessNow
- Alliance for Universal Digital Rights (AUDRi)
- Center for Democracy and Technology
- Global Digital Human Rights (Global Shapers Moscow)
- Digital Rights Ireland
- Digital Rights Watch
- Electronic Frontier Foundation
- Entertainment Consumers Association
- European Digital Rights
- Free Software Foundation
- FreedomBox
- IT-Political Association of Denmark
- Open Rights Group
- Open Web Advocacy
- Paradigm Initiative, a Pan African digital rights group
- Public Knowledge
- SMEX
- TestPAC
- World Wide Web Foundation
- Xnet

== See also ==
- A Declaration of the Independence of Cyberspace
- Anti-Counterfeiting Trade Agreement (ACTA)
- Computer accessibility
- Digital divide
  - Global digital divide
  - National broadband plans from around the world
- Digital integrity
- Digital self-determination
- Digital rights management (DRM)
- Directorate-General for Information Society and Media (European Commission)
- Electronic civil disobedience
- Global internet usage
- Global Internet Freedom Task Force (GIFT) - An initiative within the U.S. Department of State
- Graduated response (aka Three strikes)
- Human rights in cyberspace
- Information ethics
- Information privacy
- Internet censorship
  - Internet censorship by country
- Internet privacy
- Network neutrality
- Philosophy of information
- Protect IP Act (PIPA)
- Right to Internet access
- Stop Online Piracy Act (SOPA)
- Trans-Pacific Partnership
- Transatlantic Trade and Investment Partnership
- United Nations
  - Charter of the United Nations
  - Universal Declaration of Human Rights
  - Vienna Declaration
- Universal service

=== Advocacy groups ===
- La Quadrature du Net
- Electronic Frontier Foundation
- Open Rights Group
- TestPAC US Political Action Committee that defends American Digital Rights
