= Jacqueline Shearer =

American documentary director

Jacqueline Shearer (November 30, 1946 – November 26, 1993) was an American producer and director of documentary films and television shows about African Americans. Shearer was born in Boston, Massachusetts and graduated from Brandeis University.

== Career ==
Shearer directed the short film "A Minor Altercation" in 1977. The film is a docudrama set during the Boston desegregation busing crisis centered around a fight between two girls, one Black and one white.

In 1990, she wrote and directed two episodes of the 14-part documentary series Eyes on the Prize, "The Promised Land (1967-68)" and "The Keys to the Kingdom (1974-80)." She also acted as a segment producer for the episode "Back to the Movement (1979-Mid 1980s). In 1991, she acted as the director and producer of "The Massachusetts 54th Colored Infantry," made as part of the PBS documentary series American Experience.

Her work includes a number of smaller projects, such as videos on tenants rights, video installations for the Birmingham Civil Rights Institute and Boston's Museum of African American History, and various public service announcements.

Her final project "Didn't Take Low," or "Addie and the Pink Carnations," was left unfinished due to a lack of funding and Shearer's health problems. The film was to be a docudrama exploring the lives of Black women domestic workers during the Great Depression.

Shearer was a founding member of the Boston chapter of The Newsreel, a leftist American filmmaking collective that produced and distributed politically radical films. She served in a variety of roles for the Independent Television Service, which provides funding and support for public television documentaries. She worked in an advisory capacity for the Corporation for Public Broadcasting, the Film Fund, and the New York State Council on the Arts.

Materials related to many of Shearer's unfinished projects can be found in the collection of Jackie Shearer papers at the New York Public Library. These projects include "Songs of My People," a documentary about African American music; Sophronia, a love story; an adaptation of Nella Larsen's novel Quicksand; and "The Southern Lady: Image and Reality."

== Personal life ==
Shearer died from colon cancer at the age of 46 in her home in Cambridge, Massachusetts.

== Filmography ==
- "A Minor Altercation" (1977)
- "Rape Culture" (1983)
- "Incident Report" (1987)
- Eyes on the Prize (1990) [two episodes: Episode Ten: The Promised Land and Episode Thirteen: The Keys to the Kingdom]
- American Experience (1991) [one episode: Season Four, Episode Three: The Massachusetts 54th Colored Infantry]
