= Orlando Bagwell =

American film director (born 1951)

Orlando Bagwell (born June 2, 1951) is an American film director. His films focus on the history of African Americans in the United States. He has won multiple awards.

== Early life and education ==
Bagwell was born in Baltimore, Maryland, on June 2, 1951. As a teenager, Bagwell arranged sensitivity workshops for the Catholic Youth Organization in Nashua, New Hampshire, where he showed films produced by others. At the time, Bagwell thought that he would enter a career in medicine. After spending a year at Boston University — where he faced significant criticism from other black students for choosing to keep a white roommate and for being unfamiliar with essential works like Soul on Ice, the Autobiography of Malcolm X, and other important texts from the militant '60s — Bagwell decided to take a year off from school to explore his identity. A friend exposed him to jazz, starting with Miles Davis' Bitches Brew. He purchased a conga drum, learned how to play it, and also used a 35-mm camera for enjoyment. Bagwell obtained both his bachelor's and master's degrees in broadcast journalism from Boston University.

== Career ==
While Bagwell was teaching, he received a chance to work as a cameraman for GBH's Say Brother (now known as Basic Black), and eventually he joined Frontline, where he captured the story of Rev. Jesse Jackson’s 1988 presidential campaign in Running with Jesse. In 1987, Bagwell launched Roja Productions, Inc., and directed the documentary Roots of Resistance: The Story of the Underground Railroad in collaboration with American Experience. In 2004, Bagwell began working with the Ford Foundation as the head of its Freedom of Expression unit.

Bagwell produced numerous documentaries in collaboration with GBH, such as two episodes from the series Eyes on the Prize (1987, Mississippi: Is this America? and Ain't Scared of Your Jails) and American Experience's Malcolm X: Make it Plain (1994), among other undertakings. Additionally, he served as executive producer for Africans in America: America's Journey Through Slavery (1998) and directed an episode of the series. Bagwell coached the actor who played Frederick Douglass as a child in the film Frederick Douglass: When the Lion Wrote History. He operates his production company, LakeHouse Films, located in New York City.

The Ford Foundation's JustFilms initiative, which Bagwell played a key role in founding, has produced works such as the 2012 Oscar-nominated documentary How to Survive a Plague, focusing on the early years of the AIDS crisis. He also taught a documentary program at Berkeley College.

== Reception ==
Bagwell has won four Emmy Awards, three Peabody Awards, two DuPont Awards, and several Grand Prize recognitions at film festivals. Jon Else said in the book True South: Henry Hampton and "Eyes on the Prize," the Landmark Television Series That Reframed the Civil Rights Movement that "Bagwell was, like Hampton, a mysteriously charismatic man with his own fierce vision who could go into a room and whip up enthusiasm and money for a great film".
