= Eyes on the Screen =

2005 documentary film sharing campaign

Eyes on the Screen was a project to disseminate the American television documentary series Eyes on the Prize via file sharing networks without regard to copyright restrictions, during the period the series was out of print, (1993-2006).

Operating independently from the series producers, Downhill Battle initiated the "Eyes on the Screen" project, along with civil rights activist Lawrence Guyot, in January 2005. They digitized copies of the VHS tapes to encourage the use of file sharing networks such as BitTorrent to distribute the film. They also called for public screening of the film, particularly on February 8, during Black History Month.

Others took exception to Downhill's use of the series as a tool in the cause of challenging existing copyright law. Some affiliated with the production of the series (particularly producer Henry Hampton's family) have objected that a series about the civil rights movement had now been repositioned as an icon of the copyright reform movement. They pointed out that widespread distribution of illegal copies would make investors and donors less interested in funding a public re-release.

They initially pursued legal action against Downhill Battle and warned several schools planning to screen the film to keep from screening the film as a part of Eyes on the Screen. Hampton's family, represented by the firm Akin and Gump, and Downhill Battle came to a settlement agreement.

As a result, soon after their campaign began, Downhill Battle removed their BitTorrent links and issued a statement asking that all digital and illegal copies of the series be destroyed. They expressed the hope "that our efforts have not interfered with Blackside's efforts" to bring back the series to the public. The campaign instead began to emphasize the promotion of public screening of the series in each state.

Eyes on the Prize cleared all copyright hurdles and was released on DVD about one year from the time of Eyes on the Screen.

Meanwhile, the Eyes on the Screen campaign had been endorsed by groups such as the Bay Area Veterans of the Civil Rights Movement, who wrote: "Therefore, in the spirit of the Southern Freedom Movement, we who once defied the laws and customs that denied people of color their human rights and dignity, we whose faces are seen in 'Eyes on the Prize,' we who helped produce it, tonight defy the media giants who have buried our story in their vaults by publicly sharing episodes of this forbidden knowledge with all who wish to see it."
