= Callie Crossley =

American broadcast journalist

- Crossley at Boston Book Festival in 2026
- Born: Memphis, Tennessee
- Citizenship: United States
- Education: Wellesley College (B.A., 1973)
- Occupations: Broadcast journalist, radio and television
- Writing career
- Notable work: Eyes on the Prize
- Notable awards: Alfred I. duPont–Columbia University Award Gold Baton, Academy Award nomination, Emmy Award, Wellesley College Alumnae Achievement Award
- Website: www.calliecrossley.com

Callie Crossley is an American broadcast journalist and radio presenter in the Boston area.

In March 2013 she began hosting a new radio program entitled Under the Radar and continues to contribute to WGBH Radio's "Boston Public Radio", where various commentators talk with guests about local and national politics, public affairs, arts, and culture.

== Education ==
Crossley is a graduate of Wellesley College class of 1973, and holds an Honorary Doctor of Arts from Pine Manor College, and a Cambridge College Honorary Doctorate of Humane Letters. She received a Nieman Fellowship, and a fellowship from the Institute of Politics at the Harvard University John F. Kennedy School of Government.

== Career ==
External videos
- Unedited interview conducted by Callie Crossley in 1985 with Andrew Young. From the Eyes on the Prize series, Film and Media Archive, Washington University in St. Louis and the American Archive of Public Broadcasting.

From December 2010 through June 2012, she was the host of The Callie Crossley Show, a one-hour daily talk show on WGBH-FM, 89.7. Past guests on The Callie Crossley Show include filmmaker Errol Morris, historian Howard Zinn, authors Junot Díaz, Frank Bruni, Edwidge Danticat, Colson Whitehead, Isabel Wilkerson, David Remnick, lawyer/author Charles Ogletree, actors Rachel Dratch, Leonard Nimoy, Anna Deavere Smith, and Wayne Brady, choreographer Bill T. Jones, and many more.

A television and radio commentator, moderator and public speaker, Crossley lectures on the collision of old and new media, media and politics, media literacy, and the intersection of race, gender and media. She is a frequent panelist on WGBH-TV's Beat the Press, and a frequent host of WGBH-TV's Basic Black. Crossley is a regular contributor on Public Radio International's The Takeaway, and has guest hosted NPR's Tell Me More with Michel Martin, for which she also contributes commentary about wine. She is an occasional commentator on CNN's Reliable Sources, and appears regularly on Fox Morning News WXFT-TV.

== Personal life ==
Callie Crossley, originally from Memphis, Tennessee, is a barbecue connoisseur with a southern heritage.

== Awards ==
Crossley produced two of the six hours in the 1987 television documentary series Eyes on the Prize, Show Four--"No Easy Walk" and Show 6--"Bridge to Freedom", which was nominated for an Academy Award for Best Documentary Feature in 1988 during the 60th Academy Awards.

Crossley received the 2013 Alumnae Achievement Award from Wellesley College, the highest honor given to alumnae for excellence and distinction in their fields of endeavor and has been presented annually since 1970.

Crossley is recognized as a "history maker" in the nation's largest African-American video oral history collection.

== Current activities ==
In addition to hosting her radio program, Crossley is a Woodrow Wilson Visiting Fellow Visiting Lecturer, guest lecturing at colleges and universities about media, politics, and the intersection of race, gender and media. She is a featured speaker on Forum Network, a public media service of PBS, NPR and Corporation for Public Broadcasting providing a free online video lecture series featuring the world's leading scientists, educators, artists and authors Forum Network. Crossley also serves as a judge for several major journalism awards- including the Alfred I. duPont-Columbia University Awards for Excellence in Broadcast Journalism – and she writes the blog "The Crushed Grape Report".

She sits on several Boston-based Boards including the Boston Museum, the Ford Hall Forum, Cambridge Reads, and the Boston Book Festival.
