= Combating Online Infringement and Counterfeits Act =

- Long title: Combating Online Infringement and Counterfeits Act
- Acronyms (colloquial): COICA
- Nicknames: Senate Bill S.3804

Codification
- Titles amended: Chapter 113 of Title 18 of the United States Code

Legislative history
- Introduced in the Senate as Combating Online Infringement and Counterfeits Act by Patrick Leahy (D–VT) on September 20, 2010; Committee consideration by House Judiciary Committee

United States Senate Bill S.3804, known as the Combating Online Infringement and Counterfeits Act (COICA) was a bill introduced by Senator Patrick Leahy (D-VT) on September 20, 2010. It proposed amendments to Chapter 113 of Title 18 of the United States Code that would authorize the Attorney General to bring an in rem action against any domain name found "dedicated to infringing activities," as defined within the text of the bill. Upon bringing such an action, and obtaining an order for relief, the registrar of, or registry affiliated with, the infringing domain would be compelled to "suspend operation of and lock the domain name."

The bill was supported by the Motion Picture Association of America, the U.S. Chamber of Commerce, the Screen Actors Guild, Viacom, and the International Alliance of Theatrical Stage Employees, Moving Picture Technicians, Artists and Allied Crafts of the United States.

It was opposed by organizations and individuals such as Center for Democracy and Technology, the Electronic Frontier Foundation, Demand Progress, the Distributed Computing Industry Association, Tim Berners-Lee, the American Civil Liberties Union and Human Rights Watch.

The bill passed the Senate Judiciary Committee with a vote of 19-0 but never received a full vote on the Senate floor. Senator Ron Wyden (D-OR) announced he would take the steps necessary to halt COICA so it is not enacted into law in 2010, and was successful, effectively killing this bill and requiring it to be resubmitted and for it to make it through a new committee again in 2011 with a different makeup of its members. The Act was rewritten as the Protect IP Act.

== Scope ==
=== Definition of infringement ===
The text of the bill defined an infringing website as one that is:

(A) primarily designed, has no demonstrable, commercially significant purpose or use other than, or is marketed by its operator, or by a person acting in concert with the operator, to offer:

(i) goods or services in violation of title 17, United States Code, or enable or facilitate a violation of title 17, United States Code, including by offering or providing access to, without the authorization of the copyright owner or otherwise by operation of law, copies of, or public performance or display of, works protected by title 17, in complete or substantially complete form, by any means, including by means of download, transmission, or otherwise, including the provision of a link or aggregated links to other sites or Internet resources for obtaining such copies for accessing such performance or displays; or

(ii) to sell or distribute goods, services, or materials bearing a counterfeit mark, as that term is defined in section 34(d) of the Act entitled 'An Act to provide for the registration and protection of trademarks used in commerce, to carry out the provisions of certain international conventions, and for other purposes', approved July 5, 1946 (commonly referred to as the 'Trademark Act of 1946' or the 'Lanham Act'; 15 U.S.C. § 1116(d)); and

(B) engaged in the activities described in subparagraph (A), and when taken together, such activities are central to the activity of the Internet site or sites accessed through a specific domain name.

=== Powers granted ===
The bill, if passed, would have allowed the Attorney General to bring an in rem action against the infringing domain name in United States District Court, and seek an order requesting injunctive relief. If granted, such an order would compel the register of the domain name in question to take the following actions:

Upon receipt of such order, the domain name registrar or domain name registry shall suspend operation of, and may lock, the domain name.

=== Nondomestic domains ===
If the infringing website had not been located in the United States, the bill empowered the Attorney General to bring a similar action in the United States District Court for the District of Columbia. Should an order for injunctive relief been granted, the Attorney General would then have been empowered to serve said order upon, and compel to perform the actions listed:

(i) a service provider, as that term is defined in section 512(k)(1) of title 17, United States Code, or other operator of a domain name system server shall take reasonable steps that will prevent a domain name from resolving to that domain name's Internet protocol address;

(ii) a financial transaction provider, as that term is defined in section 5362(4) of title 31, United States Code, shall take reasonable measures, as expeditiously as practical, to prevent--

(I) its service from processing transactions for customers located within the United States based on purchases associated with the domain name; and

(II) its trademarks from being authorized for use on Internet sites associated with such domain name; and

(iii) a service that serves contextual or display advertisements to Internet sites shall take reasonable measures, as expeditiously as practical, to prevent its network from serving advertisements to an Internet site accessed through such domain name.

=== Enforcement ===
Should a party fail to comply with an order served upon it by the Attorney General, the Attorney General would have been able to bring an in personam action against the party in question.

=== Justice Department lists ===
The bill also called for the creation, by the Justice Department, of two publicly available lists of domain names. The first list would have been composed of domain names against which the Attorney General has obtained injunctions. Domestic domains would be required to be locked by their registrars, and service providers, financial institutions, and advertisers would be required to block service to any nondomestic domains on this list. The second list would be a list of domains alleged by the Justice Department to be infringing, but against which no action had been taken. Any service provider who willingly took steps to block access to sites on this second list would gain immunity from prosecution under this bill.

== Proposed amendment ==
Due to various concerns from outside parties, Senator Patrick Leahy proposed an amendment to the legislation that responded to these concerns, while preserving the purpose of the legislation. The amendment:

- Struck provisions that would have authorized the Justice Department to publish a listing of domain names that provided access to websites dedicated to infringing activities, but against which it did not to seek a court order under the Act, in response to concerns from Internet service providers (ISPs), online companies, and public interest groups.
- Eased the burden on ISPs and payment processors that are required to take action pursuant to this Act. The amendment specified that an ISP shall not be required to modify its network or facilities to comply with an order or take steps with respect to domain name lookups performed by others. In addition, the amendment requires only that ISPs and payment processors act as expeditiously as reasonable.
- Provided more explicit protection from legal liability for any third-party registrar, registry, ISP, payment processor or advertising network that takes action pursuant to this Act.
- Required the Attorney General to develop a process in consultation with other law enforcement agencies to coordinate related investigations.

== Public reaction ==
Public reaction to the bill was negative by consumer groups, while the bill was generally lauded by artist's rights groups, various labor unions, and the entertainment and publishing industries. The announcement of the bill was rapidly followed by a wave of protest from digital rights activists, including the Electronic Frontier Foundation.Demand Progress's petition against COICA garnered more than 300,000 signatures.

On September 30, 2010, the EFF posted an update to their Deeplinks Blog, announcing that the hearing before the Senate Judiciary Committee had been delayed until after the 2010 midterm elections. On November 18, 2010, the Senate Judiciary Committee unanimously approved the bipartisan bill. On November 26, 2010, The New York Times reported that the U.S. government had seized the domain names of 82 websites, which digital rights advocates used as an example of overreaching enforcement that can already occur under current law, which they believe will take place more frequently and on a broader basis under the more lenient enforcement requirements set by COICA.

=== Senate opposition ===
Oregon Democratic Senator Ron Wyden opposed the bill after it passed the Senate Judiciary Committee on November 18, 2010, saying that unless it is changed, he will prevent it from coming to a vote on the full Senate floor this year. He said:

It seems to me that online copyright infringement is a legitimate problem, but it seems to me that COICA as written is the wrong medicine. Deploying this statute to combat online copyright infringement seems almost like using a bunker-busting cluster bomb when what you really need is a precision-guided missile. The collateral damage of this statute could be American innovation, American jobs, and a secure Internet.

== See also ==
- Anti Counterfeiting Trade Agreement (ACTA)
- Cyber Intelligence Sharing and Protection Act (CISPA)
- Digital Millennium Copyright Act (DMCA)
- Protect IP Act (PIPA)
- Stop Online Piracy Act (SOPA)
- Trans-Pacific Partnership
