= Media Democracy Fund =

Media Democracy Fund is a nonprofit grant making initiative that works with foundations and individual donors to support digital rights, internet access, online freedom of expression, internet privacy, internet security, and equality. Media Democracy Fund is hosted by the New Venture Fund.

== History ==
Media Democracy Fund was founded by Helen Brunner, and awarded its inaugural round of grants in 2006.

== Activities ==
Media Democracy Fund is known for creating, managing and funding campaigns to support the open internet, including the successful defeat of SOPA/PIPA in 2012, and the Federal Communications Commission’s Open Internet rulemaking in 2015.

Media Democracy Fund has provided seed funding for organizations that now serve as leaders in the field of digital rights, including Fight for the Future, Media Action Grassroots Network and Open Technology Institute.

== Structure ==
Media Democracy Fund is hosted by the New Venture Fund, and has an affiliated 501c4 project called Media Democracy Action Fund.

Media Democracy Fund maintains sub-funds that focus on specific issue areas, which include an Open Internet Defense Fund, Copyright Initiative, Surveillance Fund, Global Initiatives and Rapid Response Fund.
