= Moderator Mayhem =

2023 browser game

- Developers: Copia, Leveraged Play
- Publisher: Engine
- Engine: Vue.js
- Platform: web browser
- Release: May 2023
- Genre: Casual
- Mode: Single-player

Moderator Mayhem is a casual web-based video game designed by Engine, Randy Lubin, and Mike Masnick of Techdirt targeted towards policymakers. It was published in May 2023. The game is about the challenges of content moderation of user-generated content on social media.

According to Cory Doctorow, the video game is based on a card game Masnick used to teach people about the difficulties of content moderation.

It is designed for mobile phones but can also be played on personal computers.

A followup entitled Trust & Safety Tycoon was published in October 2023.

== Gameplay ==
The player acts as a content moderator for a fictional social media company and requires decision making under time pressure, getting feedback from a manager character along the way. In later rounds, the player is required to judge appeals, or rely on the advice of an AI-based content moderation system. The gameplay is primarily swipe-based.

While the gameplay describes the topics content moderators encounter in real life, it does not display prohibited content.

== Reception ==
Moderator Mayhem was recognized as a way to better understand content moderation and the effect of policy thereon. The hosts of This Week in Google podcast said the game demonstrates how policies affect people, and that the game itself is an example of journalism. Doctorow suggests it as important to discussions of content moderation, because of the impact of technology regulation on people's lives. Business Punk magazine suggests it may help the player appreciate the difficulty of the task of content moderation, while Rob Pegoraro of PC Magazine said the game showed him he did not want a job as a content moderator. Columbia Global Freedom of Expression noted the game's relevance to discussions of legal compliance, media safety and free speech.

Der Standard compared the game, as well as the followup Trust & Safety Tycoon to the border guard simulator Papers, Please.

Brendan Sinclair of GamesIndustry.biz appreciated both games' portrayals of the difficult choices moderators face but also wrote, "I'm a little concerned the takeaway people will have from it is that moderation is difficult so it's unreasonable to ask these companies to get it right."

== Trust & Safety Tycoon ==
In October 2023, Masnick, Lubin, and Leigh Beadon published a followup game titled Trust & Safety Tycoon. Players are tasked with hiring moderators and deciding what to automate, simulating real social media platforms. According to David Pierce of The Verge, it "is like a corporate training manual... but a good and useful one." The developers interviewed trust and safety workers as research for the game.

Unlike Moderator Mayhem, Trust & Safety Tycoon does not rely on time pressure. Instead, players have to "juggle ... user growth, ad revenue, moderator speed, and team morale."
