= Roots of Resistance: The Story of the Underground Railroad =

- Written by: Theodore Thomas
- Directed by: Orlando Bagwell
- Narrated by: Ruby Dee
- Country of origin: United States
- Original language: English

Production
- Producers: Orlando Bagwell; Susan Bellows
- Cinematography: Michael Chin
- Running time: 56 minutes

Original release
- Network: PBS
- Release: 1989

Roots of Resistance: The Story of the Underground Railroad is a 1989 for-television documentary on the Underground Railroad. It was produced by the Public Broadcasting Service as part of the American Experience series.

The documentary was directed by Orlando Bagwell.
