= Evan Greer =

American activist and musician

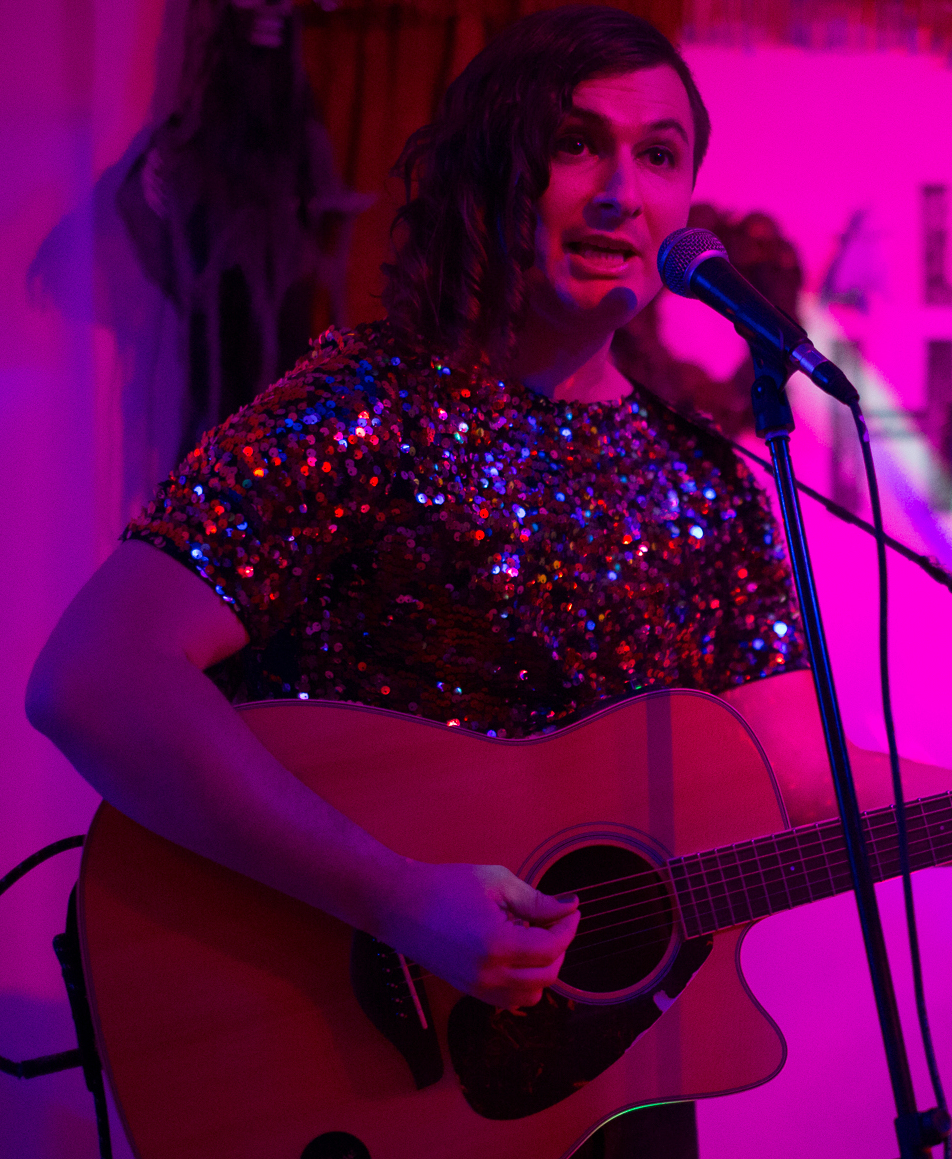
- Greer performing in 2017
- Occupations: Musician, writer, activist

Evan Greer is an American activist, writer, and musician from Boston, Massachusetts. They are the deputy director of the nonprofit advocacy group Fight for the Future. Greer is transgender and nonbinary.

== Writing and activism ==
Greer is the deputy director of Fight for the Future, having previously served as the organization's campaign director. They have written on a range of topics including Internet freedom, LGBTQ issues, surveillance, big tech, and human rights for outlets including The Washington Post, Wired, NBC News, Time, and The Guardian.

While in high school, Greer helped organize a protest against the Iraq War in 2003. They attended Swarthmore College, but dropped out to pursue music full time. In 2014 Greer helped organize the Internet Slowdown Day, an online protest in favor of net neutrality. In 2017, Fast Company called Greer "the woman leading the fight for net neutrality."

Through their work with Fight for the Future, Greer befriended Chelsea Manning and helped organize campaigns demanding Manning's release from prison. Upon Manning's release in 2017, Greer organized a benefit album to raise funds for her living expenses, with artists including Against Me!, Thurston Moore, Graham Nash, and Amanda Palmer.

In 2019, Greer penned an op-ed in BuzzFeed News with Rage Against the Machine guitarist Tom Morello about a campaign that prompted major music festivals like SXSW, Coachella, and Bonnaroo to say they will not use facial recognition surveillance at their events. Greer regards surveillance capitalism as "fundamentally incompatible with basic human rights and democracy."

In 2024, Greer protested a speech by Nancy Mace about her proposed bathroom bill, which would ban transgender people from using bathrooms other than those of their sex assigned at birth. Greer shouted towards Mace, "We have had dozens of trans people die this year because of the hate and lies that you are spreading. Are we building an internet with free speech for everyone or just the privileged few?" Mace answered back by misgendering them and making derogatory comments about their anatomy; Mace was then booed by the crowd.

== Music career ==
In 2009, Greer released the album Never Surrender. In 2016 they recorded a cover of the Anne Feeney song "You Will Answer" with the band Anti-Flag for a benefit album after Feeney was diagnosed with cancer. Greer and Feeney were longtime friends and touring partners. In 2019, Greer released the album She/Her/They/Them, which Billboard described as an "at-times folky, sometimes punk rock album". Vice characterized the album as "an eclectic mix of folk punk".

In 2021, they released the album Spotify is Surveillance. According to Greer, the album was "very much a product of the coronavirus quarantines", and called it "an open letter to transphobes." Greer noted in an interview with Fast Company that the album was also intended to raise awareness of the control of corporations such as Spotify over popular culture. The album features audio samples from Chelsea Manning and Ursula K. Le Guin. A review of the singles "Back Row" and "The Tyranny of Either/Or", noted that the songs "further show off her capacity for anthemic energy". Rolling Stone magazine described the latter as "a pop-punk anthem that could fit in with Green Day's nineties hits." A Pitchfork review of the album gave it a score of 6.7 out of 10.
