= Digital Rights Watch =

- Formation: 2016
- Founded at: Melbourne, Australia
- Type: NGO
- Legal status: Charity
- Purpose: Digital rights
- Website: digitalrightswatch.org.au
- Director: Lucie Krahulcova Chair: Elizabeth O'Shea

Digital Rights Watch is an Australian charity organisation founded in 2016 that aims to educate and uphold the digital rights of Australian citizens.

== History ==
In 2016, largely in response to the introduction of Australia's mandatory telecommunications data retention scheme, Digital Rights Watch was created at a meeting of representatives from Australian digital and human rights organisations, activists, political advisers, technology consultants and academics.

A new organisation was founded to coordinate a civil society response to the data retention scheme and other digital rights and civil liberties issues such as privacy. A key objective was building on and supporting existing policy and advocacy efforts.

== Focus ==
Digital Rights Watch's mission is to ensure that Australians are equipped, empowered, and enabled to uphold their digital rights. The organisation works on advocacy, policy reform and public-facing campaigns that push for ethical data use by corporations, good digital government practices and policies, a rights-based legal system, and empowered and informed citizens.

== Structure ==
Digital Rights Watch is an incorporated Association, registered as a national charity with the Australian Charities and Not-For-Profits Commission. It is a member-run organisation, with a board of directors elected once a year at its Annual General Meeting. The organisation also operates an Advisory Council, which informs and advises on policy and strategy.

Digital Rights Watch is a member of the CIVICUS World Alliance for Citizen Participation, the Australian Digital Inclusion Alliance, and the global Keep It On campaign. In October 2017, Digital Rights Watch's Chair Tim Singleton Norton received a special mention in the Access Now Global Heroes and Villains of Human Rights Awards.

Digital Rights Watch often works in partnerships with other Australian digital or human rights organisations such as the Human Rights Law Centre, Amnesty International Australia, Electronic Frontiers Australia, the Australian Privacy Foundation, ACFID and others. Digital Rights Watch also works with international groups such as Access Now, Electronic Frontiers Foundation, Open Media, EDRi, Privacy International and others.

== Campaigns ==
In August 2016, Digital Rights Watch coordinated a campaign, including media coverage, expressing concern over privacy issues raised in the Australian national census.

On 13 April 2017, Digital Rights Watch declared a national day of action against mandatory data retention, calling for all Australians to 'Get a VPN'.

In August 2017, Digital Rights Watch hosted an event as part of the Melbourne Writers Festival in which they profiled the personal metadata footprint of Professor Gillian Triggs, former President of the Australian Human Rights Commission.

In September 2017, Digital Rights Watch partnered with Privacy International to push for greater transparency over intelligence sharing operations between governments.

In May 2018, Digital Rights Watch launched the State of Digital Rights report, outlining several ways that Australian citizen's digital rights are being eroded.

Between October and December 2018, Digital Rights Watch coordinated a public campaign The Alliance for a Safe and Secure Internet against proposed legislation that gave increased powers to law enforcement to break encryption protocols.

In May 2019, Digital Rights Watch partnered with Electronic Frontiers Australia to launch the Save Australian Technology campaign.
