= Eyes on the Prize =

American civil rights movement documentary TV series

- Also known as: Eyes on the Prize I Eyes on the Prize II; Eyes on the Prize III
- Genre: Documentary film
- Directed by: Orlando Bagwell; Sheila Curran Bernard; Callie Crossley; James A. DeVinney; Madison D. Lacy; Louis Massiah; Thomas Ott; Samuel D. Pollard; Terry Kay Rockefeller; Jacqueline Shearer; Paul Stekler; Judith Vecchione
- Narrated by: Julian Bond
- Opening theme: "Keep Your Eyes on the Prize"
- Country of origin: United States
- Original language: English
- No. of episodes: 20

Production
- Executive producer: Henry Hampton
- Production location: United States
- Editors: Lillian Benson; Betty Ciccarelli; Daniel Eisenberg; Jeanne Jordan; Thomas Ott; Charles Scott
- Running time: 60 minutes
- Production company: Blackside

Original release
- Network: PBS
- Release: January 21, 1987 – March 5, 1990
- Network: HBO
- Release: February 25, 2025 – March 2025

Eyes on the Prize: America's Civil Rights Movement is a 14-hour American television series documentary about the civil rights movement in the United States. The series originally aired in two parts on PBS (episodes 1-6 aired weekly beginning in January 1987, and episodes 7-14 aired weekly beginning in January 1990); the series also aired in the United Kingdom on BBC2. Created and executive produced by Henry Hampton, and narrated by Julian Bond, the series uses archival footage, stills, and interviews by participants and opponents of the movement. The title of the series is derived from the title of the folk song "Keep Your Eyes on the Prize", which is used as the opening theme music in each episode.

The series won a number of Emmy Awards, Peabody Awards, and was nominated for an Academy Award.

In 2025, HBO broadcast a different, six-part series, Eyes on the Prize III: We Who Believe in Freedom Cannot Rest.

The first six episodes, Eyes on the Prize: America's Civil Rights Years, chronicles the time period between the United States Supreme Court ruling Brown v. Board of Education in 1954 and the Selma to Montgomery marches of 1965. It premiered on January 21, 1987, and concluded on February 25, 1987. The second eight episodes, Eyes on the Prize II: America at the Racial Crossroads, chronicles the time period from the national emergence of Malcolm X in 1964 to the 1983 election of Harold Washington as the first African-American mayor of Chicago. It aired from January 15, 1990, to March 5, 1990. The third part, Eyes on the Prize III: We Who Believe in Freedom Cannot Rest, chronicles those who work for racial justice from 1977 to 2015. It premiered on February 25, 2025, on HBO. The initial 14-hour documentary series was made widely available to educators on VHS tape, and re-released on DVD in 2006 by PBS.

== Broadcast ==
The film originated as two sequential projects. Part one, six hours long, was shown on PBS in early 1987 as Eyes on the Prize: America's Civil Rights Years 1954–1965. Eight more hours were broadcast in 1990 as Eyes on the Prize II: America at the Racial Crossroads 1965–1985.

In 1992, the documentary was released on home video. By the mid-1990s, both rebroadcasts and home video distribution were halted for several years due to expiration of rights and licenses of copyrighted archive footage, photographs and music used in the series. Copyright holders were demanding increasingly higher rates. Grants from the Ford Foundation and Gilder Foundation enabled Blackside and the rights clearance team to renew rights in 2005. While the return of Eyes on the Prize: America's Civil Rights Movement to public television and the educational market depended on the contributions of many, four individuals in particular are credited with achieving the complicated undertaking of rights renewals and the re-release of the series: Sandra Forman, Legal Counsel and Project Director; Cynthia Meagher Kuhn, Archivist and Rights Coordinator; Rena Kosersky, Music Supervisor; and Judi Hampton, President of Blackside and sister of Eyes executive producer and creator Henry Hampton (1940–1998). None of the archival material in the fourteen-hour documentary was removed or altered in any way.

PBS rebroadcast the first six hours on American Experience on three consecutive Mondays in October 2006, and rebroadcast the second eight hours in February 2008. After a gap of almost eight years, Eyes on the Prize was rebroadcast on World Channel on fourteen consecutive Sundays beginning on January 17, 2016.

PBS reissued an educational version of the series in the fall of 2006, making it available on DVD for the first time. It is now available to educational institutions and libraries from PBS on seven DVDs or seven VHS tapes. A consumer version of part one (1954–1965) was released in March 2010.

The licensing issues from 1993 to 2006 generated what was called Eyes on the Screen, an effort to disseminate the series by file sharing networks without regard to copyright restrictions.

== Episodes ==
=== America's Civil Rights Years 1954–1965 ===
No. overall	No. in season	Title	Directed by	Written by	Original release date
1	1	"Awakenings (1954–1956)"	Judith Vecchione	Steve Fayer	January 21, 1987
Chronicles the murder of Emmett Till in Mississippi and the Montgomery bus boycott in Alabama.
2	2	"Fighting Back (1957–1962)"	Judith Vecchione	Steve Fayer	January 28, 1987
Chronicles the school desegregation effort at Central High School by the Little Rock Nine in Arkansas from 1957 to 1958 and the later school desegregation effort at the University of Mississippi by James Meredith during the Ole Miss riot of 1962.
3	3	"Ain't Scared of Your Jails (1960–1961)"	Orlando Bagwell	Steve Fayer	February 4, 1987
Covers the Nashville sit-ins and boycotts that sought to end racial segregation at lunch counters in Tennessee and the Freedom Riders efforts to end segregation on interstate transportation and terminals throughout the southern United States.
4	4	"No Easy Walk (1961–1963)"	Callie Crossley & James A. DeVinney	Callie Crossley, James A. DeVinney, & Steve Fayer	February 11, 1987
Examines the failed attempt by the Southern Christian Leadership Conference (SCLC) in Albany, Georgia to end racial segregation and the subsequent lessons learned to win a major victory in Birmingham, Alabama during the Birmingham campaign. The film also covers the March on Washington, one of the largest political rallies for civil rights in the history of the United States.
5	5	"Mississippi: Is This America? (1962–1964)"	Orlando Bagwell	Steve Fayer	February 18, 1987
Chronicles the murder of Medgar Evers in 1963 and the murders of Chaney, Goodman, and Schwerner in 1964 in Mississippi. The film also covers the Mississippi Freedom Democratic Party (MFDP) attendance at the Democratic National Convention in Atlantic City during the United States presidential election of 1964.
6	6	"Bridge to Freedom (1965)"	Callie Crossley & James A. DeVinney	Callie Crossley, James A. DeVinney, & Steve Fayer	February 25, 1987
Examines the effort to restore voting rights in Selma, Alabama during the Selma to Montgomery marches.

=== America at the Racial Crossroads 1965–1985 ===
No. overall	No. in season	Title	Directed by	Written by	Original release date
7	1	"The Time Has Come (1964–66)"	James A. DeVinney & Madison D. Lacy	James A. DeVinney & Madison D. Lacy	January 15, 1990
Examines a lead member of the Nation of Islam - Malcolm X. It also chronicles the political organizing work of the Lowndes County Freedom Organization (LCFO) in Alabama and the shooting of James Meredith during the March Against Fear.
8	2	"Two Societies (1965–68)"	Sheila Curran Bernard & Samuel D. Pollard	Sheila Curran Bernard, Steve Fayer, & Samuel D. Pollard	January 22, 1990
Follows Martin Luther King Jr. during the Chicago Freedom Movement in Illinois, and the tumultuous Detroit Riot of 1967 in Michigan as well as the 1965 Watts Riot in California.
9	3	"Power! (1966–68)"	Louis J. Massiah & Terry Kay Rockefeller	Steve Fayer, Louis J. Massiah, & Terry Kay Rockefeller	January 29, 1990
Chronicles the election of Carl Stokes as the mayor of Cleveland and one of the first two African Americans to become mayor of a major U.S. city. The film also covers the formation of the Black Panther Party (BPP) and community control of the Ocean Hill-Brownsville school district in Brooklyn during the New York City teachers' strike of 1968.
10	4	"The Promised Land (1967–68)"	Jacqueline Shearer & Paul Stekler	Steve Fayer, Jacqueline Shearer, & Paul Stekler	February 5, 1990
Chronicles the final years of Martin Luther King Jr.'s life. It also covers the Poor People's Campaign and Resurrection City in Washington, D.C.
11	5	"Ain't Gonna Shuffle No More (1964–72)"	Sheila Curran Bernard & Samuel D. Pollard	Sheila Curran Bernard, Steve Fayer, & Samuel D. Pollard	February 15, 1990
Chronicles the emergence of boxer Muhammad Ali, the student movement at Howard University, and the gathering of the National Black Political Convention in Gary, Indiana.
12	6	"A Nation of Law? (1968–71)"	Louis J. Massiah, Thomas Ott, & Terry Kay Rockefeller	Steve Fayer, Louis J. Massiah, Thomas Ott, & Terry Kay Rockefeller	February 19, 1990
Chronicles the leadership and assassination of Fred Hampton of the Black Panther Party (BPP) in Chicago. The second part of the film covers the Attica Prison riot in Attica, New York.
13	7	"The Keys to the Kingdom (1974–80)"	Jacqueline Shearer & Paul Stekler	Steve Fayer, Jacqueline Shearer, & Paul Stekler	February 26, 1990
The documentary examines the Boston school desegregation crisis involving busing in Massachusetts. The second part of the film chronicles the election of Maynard Jackson as mayor of Atlanta and the first African American to become mayor of a major U.S. city in the southern United States. The last part of the film examines affirmative action and the landmark United States Supreme Court ruling Regents of the University of California v. Bakke (1978).
14	8	"Back to the Movement (1979–mid 80s)"	James A. DeVinney & Madison D. Lacy	James A. DeVinney, Steve Fayer, & Madison D. Lacy	March 5, 1990
Covers the Miami riot of 1980 and the election of Harold Washington as the first African-American mayor of Chicago. The film finishes with an overview of the Civil Rights Movement and its effect upon the United States and the world.

== Book ==
External videos
- Interview with Juan Williams on Eyes on the Prize, February 3, 1987, C-SPAN

The book Eyes on the Prize: America's Civil Rights Years, 1954–1965 was created as a companion volume to the series during post-production by the producers and publishing staff at Blackside, Inc. They were assisted by Juan Williams, a journalist with The Washington Post. First published by Viking Press in 1987, the book used a portion of the iconic photograph of the Selma to Montgomery march taken by Look magazine photographer James Karales on its cover.

== Reception ==
The series has been hailed by numerous critics as more than just a historical document.

== Awards ==
Both Eyes on the Prize and Eyes on the Prize II won Peabody Awards and Alfred I. duPont–Columbia University Awards.

The series also won six Emmy Awards, including two for Ain't Gonna Shuffle No More.

Episode six, Bridge to Freedom, produced by Callie Crossley and James A. DeVinney, was nominated for an Academy Award for Best Documentary Feature in 1988 during the 60th Academy Awards.

== See also ==
- American Archive of Public Broadcasting
- Civil rights movement in popular culture
- List of American Experience episodes
- List of American films of 1987
- List of American films of 1990
