= Engine (organization) =

Engine Advocacy
- Established: September 2011
- Headquarters: Washington, D.C.
- Board of directors: Marvin Ammori, Leah Belsky, Josh Mendelsohn, Derek Parham, Julie Samuels
- Website: www.engine.is

Engine is a non-profit group advocating for public policies that encourage the growth of technology startups across the United States. Engine is composed of a 501(c)(3) organization called Engine Research Foundation and a 501(c)(4) called Engine Advocacy. Engine Advocacy and Engine Foundation are the two branches of a non-profit organization that conducts economic research and policy analysis research and provides support and advice to technology startups. Engine Advocacy was an instrumental partner in the effort to defeat PIPA and SOPA in 2012. The organization researches and advocates around the issues of access to government grant programs like SBIR, open Internet, intellectual property law reform, privacy laws, Internet and spectrum access, and immigration reform. As of 2025, Engine operates independently of its funders and receives donations from a variety of organizations including Amazon, Andreessen Horowitz, the Consumer Technology Association, Google, Meta, Stand Together Fellowships, and Workday.

== History ==
Engine Advocacy was founded in September 2011 to advocate for public policies that benefit the startup economy. In December 2011, over 300 entrepreneurs and investors attended Engine Advocacy's first meeting. Engine supported the 2011 Startup Visa Act, a proposed amendment to the United States immigration law to create a visa category for foreign entrepreneurs who have raised capital from qualified American investors and the Startup Act and Startup Act 2.0. These pieces of legislation were intended to make the immigration process for entrepreneurs and startup employees easier. In 2012, Mike McGeary represented Engine Advocacy at the Republican National Convention and the Democratic National Convention. Engine Advocacy was involved in stopping SOPA passing the JOBS Act that year.

In April 2013, Engine Advocacy met with the United States House Committee on Small Business in Washington, D.C. to advocate for startups. Engine advocacy supported #iMarch, a virtual march on Washington in support of bipartisan comprehensive immigration reform in May 2013. The organization launched the "Keep Us Here" campaign in June 2013. The campaign aimed to facilitate communication between entrepreneurs, investors and D.C. policymakers with the use of a website that featured various methods of contact. In 2013, Engine Advocacy mapped where technology jobs are located in the United States based on the United States Census. The project's goal was to raise awareness of the technology industry's widespread impact.

Engine Advocacy and the New America Foundation's Open Technology Institute organized a letter sent to the Federal Communications Commission in May 2014 to express alarm over proposed net neutrality rules and urge regulators to protect Internet openness.

Engine Advocacy appointed Julie Samuels as executive director and president in 2014. Samuels served as a member of the board since the organization's foundation in 2011.

In 2014, Engine Advocacy lobbied on behalf of more than 500 technology startups and investors. In April of that year, Engine Advocacy hosted, along with the Consumer Electronics Association, a fly-in to Washington D.C. for tech entrepreneurs to lobby for patent reform.

In 2017, Engine established #StartupsEverywhere, a weekly article series spotlighting the work of early-stage startup founders and how federal policies have helped or hindered their business. As of 2026, Engine has published over 350 profiles in the series covering startups in all 50 states and several U.S. territories.

In 2023, Engine worked with Leveraged Play and Copia to release Moderator Mayhem a video game intended to teach policymakers about the difficulty of content moderation

== Research ==
Engine Research Foundation has conducted original research on high-tech entrepreneurship. In 2012, Engine commissioned a study on high-tech employment and wages in the United States from the Bay Area Council Economic Institute; the study found that the creation of one high tech job accounts for the creation of 4.3 other jobs in a local economy. A joint report with the Kauffman Foundation in 2013 found that high-tech startups are a key driver of job creation throughout the United States.
