= Internet Security Alliance =

Non-profit collaboration

- Type: Non-profit
- Industry: Information security
- Founded: 2001; 25 years ago in Virginia, United States
- Headquarters: Arlington, Virginia
- Key people: Larry Clinton, President and CEO
- Services: Public policy advocacy
- Website: isalliance.org

Internet Security Alliance (ISA) was founded in 2001 as a non-profit collaboration between Carnegie Mellon University's CyLab and Electronic Industries Alliance, a federation of trade associations. The Internet Security Alliance is focused on cyber security, acting as a forum for information sharing and leadership on information security, and advocacy for corporate security interests.

== International operations ==
The Internet Security Alliance operates with a global membership to provide international security for its partners. The organization's membership includes companies located on four continents, and the Executive Committee always includes at least one non-U.S.-based company. The Internet Security Alliance believes that international communication is crucial for long-term greater information security, as it allows for a more realistic approach to addressing the many challenges faced by users of the Internet.

== Publications ==
Published in 2009, The Financial Impact of Cyber Risk is the first known guidance document to attempt to approach the financial impact of cyber risks from the perspective of core business functions. It claims to provide guidance to CFOs and their colleagues responsible for legal issues, business operations and technology, privacy and compliance, risk assessment and insurance, and corporate communications.
