= Liberty Coalition =

Non-profit organization

The Liberty Coalition is a non-profit organization based in Washington, D.C. that connects politically diverse organizations and promotes transpartisan policies related to civil liberties and basic human rights.

The Liberty Coalition is associated with the Liberty and Privacy Network.

== History ==
The Liberty Coalition was founded in 2005 by Michael D. Ostrolenk, J. Bradley Jansen, and James Plummer.

In January 2006, the Coalition received national media attention upon co-sponsoring former Vice President Al Gore's speech, "Restoring the Rule of Law." Former Republican Congressman Bob Barr was scheduled to introduce Al Gore to emphasize the transpartisan nature of the event, however, technical difficulties made Barr's telecast impossible.

== Issue areas ==
The Liberty Coalition has nine working groups which focus on issues they consider to be important. They include:

- A Federal or National ID
- Financial privacy
- National Security Whistleblowers
- Domestic Spying and Surveillance
- The Department of Defense's recruitment database for teenagers
- Federally supported mass mental health screening
- The use of the material witness statute following 9/11
- Medical privacy
- Constitutional drug policy
- Consumer Privacy

== Partner organizations ==
The Liberty Coalition has numerous partner organizations that span the political spectrum. They are quick to note that the positions they take "should not be taken as an endorsement by any partner organization unless explicitly stated as such." A few include:

- American Association for Health Freedom
- Americans for Tax Reform
- Bill of Rights Defense Committee
- Center for Cognitive Liberty and Ethics
- Criminal Justice Policy Foundation
- Downsize DC
- First Amendment Foundation
- Defending Dissent Foundation
- Pain Relief Network
- Townhall.com
