= Public Interest Technology University Network =

The Public Interest Technology University Network (PIT-UN) is a consortium of universities and foundations that collaborate to develop the field of public interest technology. It was formed in March 2019.

The group currently has 59 member universities from across the U.S. and four international institutions.:

PIT-UN seeks to address challenges between industry and society. Member institutions are committed to bringing together students and educators from multiple disciplines together to solve the toughest challenges the U.S. and the world face, by building the nascent field of public interest technology and growing a new generation of civic-minded technologists. Through the development of curricula, research agendas, and experiential learning programs in the public interest technology space, the member institutions are using innovative tactics with the aim to develop graduates with multiple fluencies at the intersection of technology and policy.

In October 2019 the organization awarded US$3 million in grants to 21 institutions. The organization has since awarded more rounds of funding through the PIT University Network Challenge. In 2020 28 institutions were awarded grants totaling $4.4 million, and in November 2021 $3.61 million was awarded to 24 institutions. In October 2022, $2.3 million was awarded to 18 institutions. Grants are exclusively available via application to members of PIT-UN.

== Members ==
The full list of current PIT-UN members as of December 2022 is:

- Arizona State University
- Boston University
- California Polytechnic State University
- Carnegie Mellon University
- Case Western Reserve University
- Center for Education and Research on Innovation (CEPI FGV São Paulo Law School), Brazil
- Cleveland State University-Ohio
- Columbia University
- Cornell University
- Florida International University
- Fordham University
- Georgetown University
- Georgia Institute of Technology
- Georgia State University
- Harvard University
- Howard University
- Illinois Institute of Technology
- Indiana University
- Lane College
- LeMoyne-Owen College
- Massachusetts Institute of Technology
- Meharry Medical College
- Miami Dade College
- Nazareth College
- New York University
- Northeastern University
- Olin College of Engineering
- Pardee RAND Graduate School
- Pennsylvania State University
- Pepperdine University
- Princeton University
- Prairie View A & M University
- Rochester Institute of Technology
- San Jose State University
- Stanford University
- Stillman College
- Temple University
- The City University of New York
- The George Washington University
- The Ohio State University
- The University of Texas, Austin
- The University of the South (Sewanee)
- University of Arizona
- University of California, Berkeley
- University of California, Santa Cruz
- University of Chicago
- University of Edinburgh, Scotland
- University of Illinois, Chicago
- University of Massachusetts, Amherst
- University of Michigan
- University of Pennsylvania
- University of Rijeka, Croatia
- University of Szeged, Hungary
- University of Virginia
- University of Washington
- Virginia Tech
- William & Mary
- Worcester Polytechnic Institute

Educational institutions interested in joining PIT UN can review the process on Pitcases
