= Participatory Culture Foundation =

U.S. non-profit organization

The Participatory Culture Foundation (PCF) is a non-profit organization based in Worcester, Massachusetts. Its primary project is a free and open-source software Internet television platform called Miro, formerly called the Democracy player. It is also the developer of Broadcast Machine, an open-source video publishing tool.

A 501(c)(3) organization, the PCF's mission is to "develop technology and services that ensure everyone has access to all that the Internet has to offer", because "information is critical to building a more equitable and peaceful society".

== History ==
The organization was founded in February 2005. The Downhill Battle project precedes PCF.

PCF has received financial support from Andy and Deborah Rappaport and Mitch Kapor. It has also received support from the Surdna Foundation, Knight Foundation, and other private donors.

As of 2006, Nicholas Reville was a co-director of PCF. That year, PCF led a workshop at YearlyKos on how individual citizens can make professional-quality political ad videos and distribute them over the Internet.

On May 29, 2007, the Mozilla Foundation announced that it had awarded PCF a grant to continue their work on its open-source video projects.

== Projects ==
- Miro – a free/open-source broadcatching software application which allows subscribing to web feeds of downloadable audio and video
  - Miro Guide – a web-based directory of audio and video web feeds, integrated by default into the application
- Miro Community – a free web hosting service for user-submitted video; hosts mostly Theora-formatted video in HTML5-compatible web browsers
- Broadcast Machine – a desktop application allowing easy publishing of video files and updated internet television channels
- Amara (formerly Universal Subtitles) – enables collaboration on captions and subtitles
- The Channel Channel – a project to provide one-minute previews of internet channels; last updated in January 2007
- Video Bomb – a folksonomy-driven video directory
- Miro Video Converter – an application to convert any video to MP4, Theora or formats compatible with Android, iPod, iOS (iPhone, iPod Touch, iPad), and PlayStation Portable devices

== See also ==
- Participatory culture
- Public participation
