= Techdirt =

American Internet blog

- Country of origin: United States
- Owner: Floor64, Inc.
- Creator: Mike Masnick
- Editor: Mike Masnick
- Website: techdirt.com
- Commercial: Yes
- Registration: Optional
- Launched: 1997; 29 years ago
- Current status: Active

Techdirt is an American Internet blog that reports on technology's legal challenges and related business and economic policy issues, in context of the digital revolution. It focuses on intellectual property, patent, information privacy and copyright reform in particular.

== Description ==
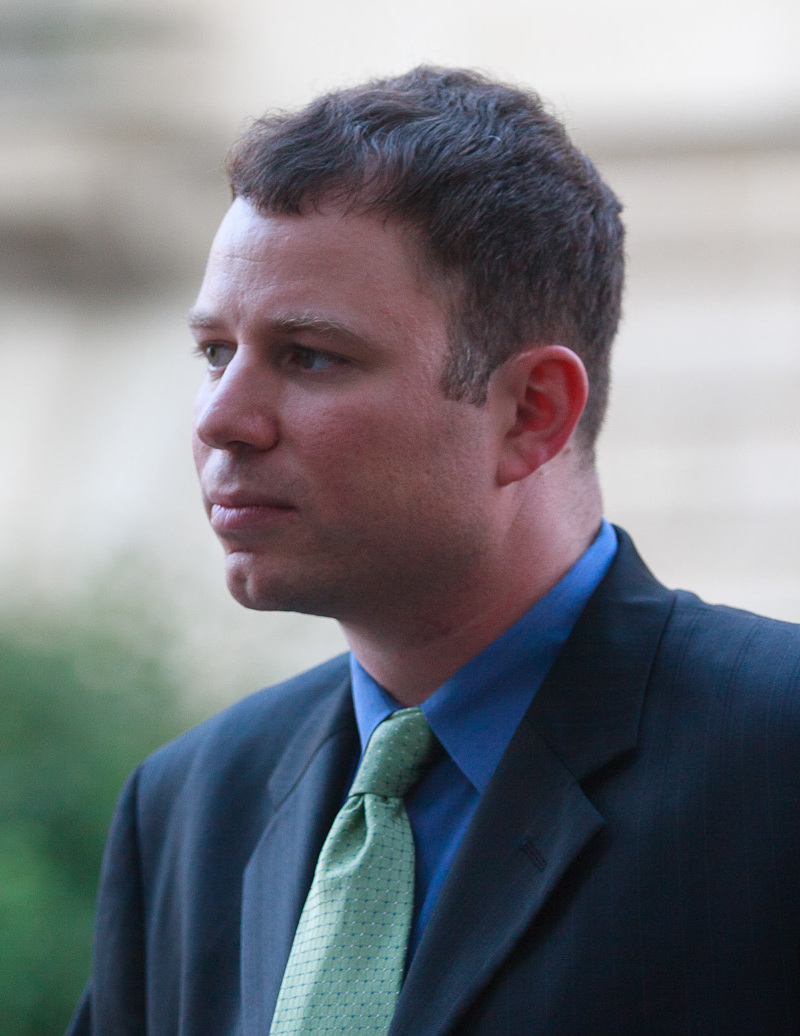
Techdirt founder Mike Masnick in 2012

The website was founded in 1997 by Mike Masnick. It was originally based on the weblog software Slash. Techdirt's content is based on reader submissions as well as the editorial staff's picks. The website makes use of MySQL, Apache, and PHP, and is hosted at ActionWeb. Techdirt is managed by Floor 64, a company located in Redwood City, California, US. As of 2009, Techdirt had eight full-time employees.

There is a guest editor section in Techdirt, called "Favorite Techdirt Posts of the Week", where several high-profile personalities of politics and culture contributed articles over the years; for instance Marietje Schaake, Member of the European Parliament for the Netherlands, Sen. Ron Wyden of Oregon or author Glyn Moody.

== Reception and impact ==
The popular term the "Streisand effect" - attempting to downplay an issue instead gives it more exposure - was coined on Techdirt by founder Mike Masnick in January 2005.

In 2003, Forbes Magazine selected Techdirt as one of the "Best Tech Blogs". In 2006 Bloomberg Businessweek praised Techdirt for its "sharp, pithy analysis of current tech issues". In 2007, Techdirt was nominated for the Webby Award in the section "Web Blog – Business". Techdirt has been named among the favorite blogs of PC Magazine in 2008. In 2015, Techdirt allowed readers to remove web ads.

In 2009, English singer Lily Allen created a blog critical of music piracy in which she plagiarized an entire post from Techdirt. Following an exchange with Techdirt, debating hypocrisy in the musician's handling of copyright infringement, Allen shut down her blog.

Marvin Ammori, a lawyer who advocates on network neutrality and Internet freedom, praised Techdirt in the 2011 Stop Online Piracy Act controversy, saying: "I'm not sure anyone did more to educate the public about SOPA than Techdirt." A study analyzing coverage of the SOPA-PIPA debates from 2010 to 2012 described Techdirt as "the single most important professional media site over the entire period, overshadowing the more established media."

== Shiva Ayyadurai lawsuit ==
In 2017, American entrepreneur Shiva Ayyadurai filed suit against Techdirt for defamation in response to a series of articles critical of Ayyadurai's claims to have invented email as a teenager in 1978, an assertion which has been dismissed by several experts. Techdirt announced its intention to fight the suit, describing it as a "First Amendment fight for its life". Masnick filed for the suit to be dismissed under California's anti-SLAPP statute. A federal judge dismissed the defamation claims on September 6, 2017. In June 2018, attorneys for Ayyadurai appealed the ruling to the United States Court of Appeals for the First Circuit. The two parties settled out-of-court in May 2019 with no money changing hands, and Techdirt's articles remaining online with an added link to a rebuttal on Ayyadurai's website.

During the lawsuit, Techdirt accepted funding from multiple sources to expand its reporting on free speech topics, including from the Freedom of the Press Foundation, Automattic, the Charles Koch Foundation, Union Square Ventures, and Craig Newmark.

== Other work ==
In 2012, Techdirt published a report on the state of the entertainment industry, arguing that despite the rise of online file sharing, the music industry and broader entertainment industry were still able to make significant money.

In 2018, Techdirt and Diegetic Games ran a Kickstarter campaign to publish a version of a CIA training card game that had been released to the public after a FOIA request.

Masnick and Techdirt run a think tank called Copia, which has received funding from companies such as Google and Yelp. Through this effort, Masnick has worked on multiple policy-focused video games, including Moderator Mayhem, a game focused on content moderation, and a followup titled Trust & Safety Tycoon.

The site has organized an annual game jam, wherein developers are tasked with developing games that are derivative works of works that had entered the public domain in the United States upon the beginning of the year.
