= IT-Political Association of Denmark =

Danish NGO

- Type: non-profit organization
- Founded: 2002, Denmark
- Headquarters: Denmark
- Revenue: 1,500 (2020)
- Website: www.itpol.dk

The IT-Political Association (Danish: IT-Politisk Forening, commonly known as IT-Pol) is a Danish non-profit NGO, which works to collect information on IT and convey this to politicians and the society to get the best possible grounds for legislation. The association is independent of political parties and communicates with politicians from all political parties. Membership is open to anyone.

IT-Pol is the Danish equivalent of the Electronic Frontier Foundation.

The Free Software privacy CD, Polippix, was started by the IT-Political Association.

== Issues ==
IT-Pol is primarily concerned with issues that restricts citizens and innovation.

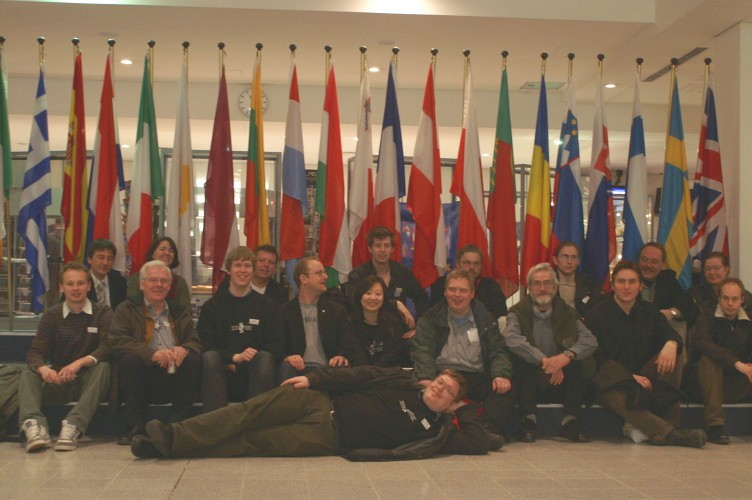
Members of IT-Pol in the European Parliament

=== Censorship ===
Denmark is one of the countries in which most ISPs filters DNS traffic by default. IT-Pol regards this policy as censorship, as the filter filters content that is legal to view in Denmark.

=== Privacy ===
The Danish surveillance law, Overvågningsloven (in Danish) was actively fought by IT-Pol. IT-Pol developed a CD called Polippix that can mitigate most of the Internet related surveillance included in the surveillance law.

=== Software patents ===
IT-Pol believes software patents are not beneficial for innovation and therefore fights Software Patents.

=== Copyright ===
IT-Pol believes the balance between society and rights holder should be pushed more towards the society.

=== Digital rights management ===
IT-Pol believes digital rights management causes problems for normal citizens and therefore is not in the interest of the citizens. IT-Pol therefore fights DRM.

=== Open Standards ===
IT-Pol believes open standards will foster innovation and remove lock-in. IT-Pol therefore promotes Open Standards and fights proprietary standards.

=== E-voting ===
IT-Pol believes E-voting should only be allowed if the election has an analog audit trail (paper trail).

=== Use of IT in the public sector ===
IT-Pol believes the public sector should use IT that makes interoperation with the citizens easier.

=== Spam ===
IT-Pol supports the ban on E-mail spam.
