= Demand Progress =

Internet activist organization

- Official logo
- Formation: 2010
- Type: 501(c)4 (sponsored by Sixteen Thirty Fund) and 501(c)(3) (sponsored by New Venture Fund)
- Legal status: Active
- Purpose: Civil liberties, anti-corporatocracy, and government reform advocacy
- Headquarters: Washington, D.C., and Providence, Rhode Island
- Region served: Worldwide, most focus on U.S.
- Members: Approximately 2 million members, open enrollment via email
- Executive director: David Segal
- Co-founder: Aaron Swartz
- Program director: David Moon
- Website: demandprogress.org

Demand Progress is a US-based internet activist-related entity encompassing a 501(c)4 arm sponsored by the Sixteen Thirty Fund and a 501(c)(3) arm sponsored by the New Venture Fund. It specializes in online-intensive and other grassroots activism to support Internet freedom, civil liberties, transparency, and human rights, and in opposition to censorship and corporate control of government. The organization was founded through a petition in opposition to the Combating Online Infringement and Counterfeits Act, sparking the movement that eventually defeated COICA's successor bills, the Stop Online Piracy Act and the PROTECT IP Act, two highly controversial pieces of United States legislation.

The organization has played key roles in forwarding the passage of net neutrality rules, blocking expansion of the Computer Fraud and Abuse Act, under which co-founder Aaron Swartz was indicted, and other key legislative efforts. Estimated membership in 2015 was over two million.

== Campaigns ==
Demand Progress has been involved in grassroots and direct lobbying campaigns in relation to the following efforts, among others:

=== Support ===
- Whistleblowing and whistleblowers such as that of Edward Snowden; also opposing the SEC's motions, which they themselves had admitted would stifle attempts at reporting wrongdoing.
- Reform of the Computer Fraud and Abuse Act, via Aaron's Law and other means.
- Support for Net Neutrality regulations, including co-leading the successful Internet Slowdown Day.
- Demand Progress has worked on various projects in tandem with numerous other similar organizations, such as Electronic Frontier Foundation, Center for Democracy and Technology, the American Civil Liberties Union, Fight for the Future, et al.

=== Opposition ===
- The Trans-Pacific Partnership agreement, a sweeping trade agreement involving many countries around the Pacific Rim is being negotiated in secret as of July 2015.
- President Obama's support for appointing chief presidential counter-terrorism supervisor John O. Brennan as a replacement for Secretary of State Hillary Clinton, on grounds of his association with political movements legitimizing extrajudicial killings, widely regarded by civil libertarians as state-sponsored terrorism.
- COICA, and its descendants PIPA and SOPA. It played a critical role in the passage of net neutrality rules in 2014–15 and has engaged in dozens of other campaigns since its inception.
- Backscatter X-ray or "nude scanning devices" used by the Transportation Security Administration (TSA).
- Government-mandated Internet IDs, a law proposed by (then) Commerce Secretary Gary Locke, which raised skepticism over the efficacy and questionable effects on privacy.
- Continuation of the Patriot Act, which was set to expire in 2013 but swiftly received large support in Senate for a 5-year reauthorization in late 2012, only a few weeks before congressional terms expired.
- Protecting Cyberspace as a National Asset Act, in regard to the "kill switch" controversy which saw a public concern for executive power to "authorize emergency measures to protect the nation's most critical infrastructure if a cyber vulnerability is being exploited or is about to be exploited".
- Modern debtors' prisons, which have also found opposition from justices in the various states where they are still legal.
- Censorship of Facebook, including advocacy for an "anti-censorship policy" after Facebook deactivated Korryn Gaines's account
- S. 978 (112th), an ill-defined bill which has the potential to allow copyright trolls to press charges against directors of online videos containing clips of copyrighted media, and furthermore anyone who embeds said content into her own website.
- The Motion Picture Association of America and United States Chamber of Commerce have stated their opposition to Demand Progress on numerous occasions, mainly in respect to their stance on internet censorship. David Moon, Demand Progress' program director, responded to their statements, noting that the mere existence of their retort was proof that "the proponents are panicking."
