= Fight for the Future =

US-based digital rights group

- Abbreviation: fightfortheftr
- Formation: October 2011; 15 years ago
- Type: 501(c)(4) non-profit organization
- Purpose: Digital rights
- Headquarters: Worcester, Massachusetts
- Website: www.fightforthefuture.org

Fight for the Future (often abbreviated fightfortheftr or FFTF) is an American nonprofit advocacy group in the area of digital rights that was founded in 2011. The group aims to promote causes related to copyright legislation, as well as online privacy and censorship through the use of the Internet.

== History ==
The organization was founded by Tiffiniy Cheng and Holmes Wilson in October 2011, and is incorporated in Boston, Massachusetts. There is no central office and all staff work remotely. Cheng and Wilson were previously involved in Participatory Culture Foundation, a nonprofit in the area of free culture. Initial funding for the organization was provided by Media Democracy Fund. Cheng and Wilson became friends when they attended the Massachusetts Academy of Math and Science, a school for talented students in Worcester. Cheng was born in a Macau refugee camp to parents who fled the Vietnam War. Before starting FFTF, the two also formed Participatory Culture Foundation, a nonprofit that works to increase cultural collaboration, and built Miro; an open-source video and music sharing platform; Open Congress, a legislation website; and Amara, a tool for crowdsourced video subtitling. After Cheng and Holmes left FFTF in 2018, Sarah Roth-Gaudette, former Chief Operating Officer, became the executive director. Roth-Gaudette previously managed campaigns for U.S. PIRG and MoveOn.org. Former Campaign Director Evan Greer is now deputy director. Greer is also an international punk folk musician and transgender activist.

== Copyright campaigns ==
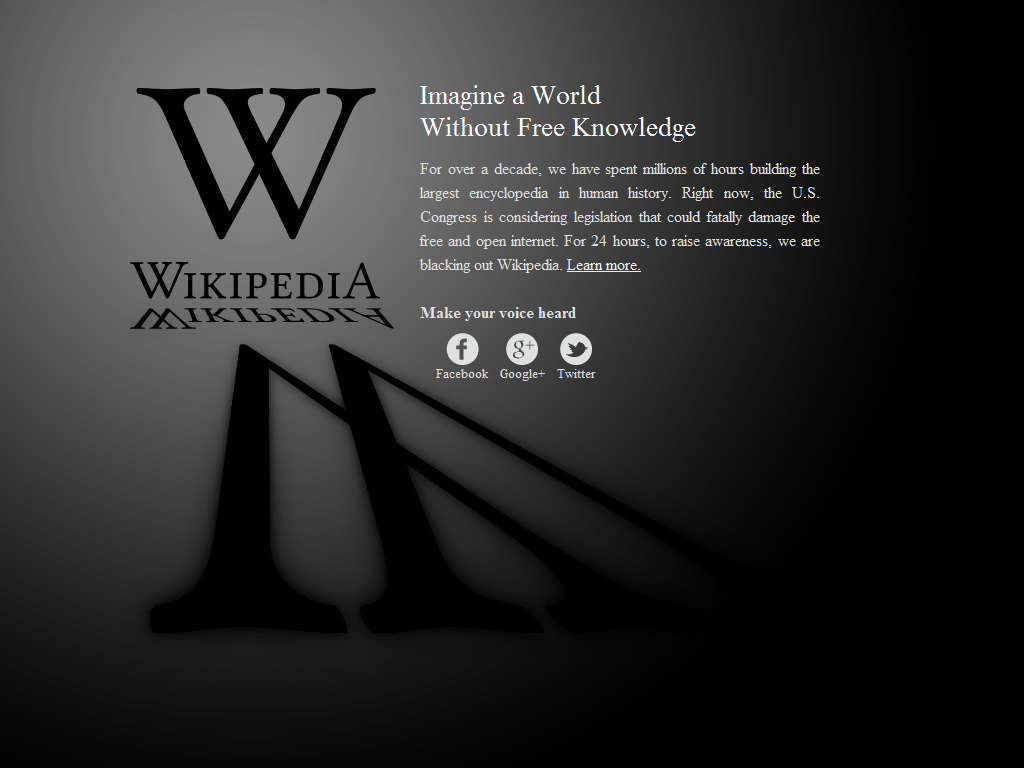
The sole page on the English Wikipedia during the January 18, 2012, blackout

=== SOPA and PIPA protests ===
Fight for the Future was involved in the online protests against the Stop Online Piracy Act and PROTECT IP Act in January 2012. The group was involved in coordinating the action in which a number of websites displayed messages advocating against the proposed bills. Protests were based on concerns that the bills, intended to provide more robust responses to copyright infringement (also known as piracy) arising outside the United States, contained measures that could possibly infringe online freedom of speech, websites, and Internet communities. Protesters also argued that there were insufficient safeguards in place to protect sites based upon user-generated content. According to FFTF, more than 115,000 websites joined the Internet protest. Major sites like Mozilla, Wikipedia, Google, Reddit, Tumblr, and Craigslist blacked out much of their homepage and directed visitors to links through which they could contact lawmakers. In addition to the online protests, there were simultaneous physical demonstrations in several U.S. cities, including New York City, San Francisco and Seattle, and separately during December 2011 a mass boycott of then-supporter GoDaddy.

=== Net neutrality campaigns ===
Fight for the Future created the Internet Defense League as a means of coordinating possible future protests, similar to the ones it helped organize in January 2012. The League was focused on the passage of net neutrality at the Federal Communications Commission (FCC). Working with Free Press and Demand Progress, FFTF launched the Battle for the Net to serve as the hub for the campaign.

=== Internet Slowdown Day ===
FFTF, together with Demand Progress, Engine Advocacy, and Free Press organized this Internet-wide protest on September 10, 2014, during which thousands of sites across the web displayed an alert with a symbolic 'loading' symbol to promote a call to action for users to push comments to the FCC, Congress, and the White House. The tool was credited with breaking a 1-day submission record of 780,000 comments to the FCC. On March 12, 2015, the FCC released the specific details of its new net neutrality rules, and on April 13, 2015, the final rule was published.

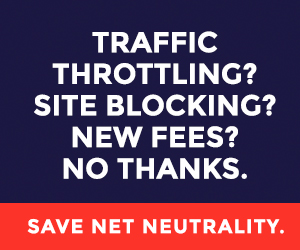
Banner supporting net neutrality

Fight for the Future organized the Day of Action to Save Net Neutrality on July 12, 2017, to advocate for net neutrality in which over 50,000 websites and apps that supported net neutrality displayed the dreaded "spinning wheel" of a stalled connection and mimic what could happen if the FCC rolled back the rules. The protest drove millions of phone calls, emails, tweets, faxes, and comments to Congress and the FCC. Major participants included Twitter, Etsy, OkCupid, Vimeo, ACLU, Change.org, Greenpeace, Reddit, Netflix, Spotify, 4chan, Airbnb, Mozilla, Tinder, PornHub, Expedia, Imgur, and Yelp.

=== Verizon protests ===
On December 7, 2017, a week before the FCC Chair Ajit Pai (former Verizon counsel) moved to repeal net neutrality, FFTF and Free Press organized over 700 protests in front of Verizon stores in every state in the country; nearly 300 people attended the rally in midtown Manhattan. A New York Times article highlighted the role of young people in these protests.

=== Congressional Review Act (CRA) ===
After the FCC voted to repeal the 2015 Open Internet Order, FFTF applied pressure on Congress to pass the CRA which would undo the FCC's decision. On May 16, 2018, fifty United States senators including three Republican Senators, voted to restore net neutrality under the CRA. FFTF's DemsAgainstThe.net campaign targeted the 16 House Democrats who did not support the Act, listing the total donations that each official received from the telecommunications industry. The Congressional term ended before the House could act, preventing the CRA from going through.

=== California net neutrality law (SB 822) ===
When Internet service providers (ISPs) made an estimated $1.3 million in donations to California lawmakers to try to weaken the state's robust net neutrality bill, FFTF activists fought back through phone calls, texts, ad buys, lawmaker scoreboards, and crowdfunded billboards. Following reports that Verizon throttled service to firefighters battling the worst wildfire in the state's history, more than 1,000 firefighters and other first responders signed on to an open letter calling for the restoration of the rules. The California bill passed with bipartisan backing on August 31, 2018. The LA Times and other major outlets credited the public outcry for the turnaround. After the U.S. Department of Justice challenged the law in court, the state agreed to delay its implementation until a final ruling. On October 1, 2019, the D.C. Circuit Court of Appeals ruled to allow states to pass their own rules.

=== FCC legal irregularities ===
FFTF challenged the FCC's claim that Distributed Denial of Service (DDoS) attacks prevented the filing of tens of thousands of pro-net neutrality comments. FFTF's Comcastroturf.com tool helped Internet users collectively investigate fraudulent comments submitted to the FCC's net neutrality docket using stolen identities and helped spark major investigations from members of Congress, state Attorneys General, the Wall Street Journal, the Government Accountability Office, and others. Comcast tried to shut down the site, and sent FFTF a cease and desist order which it later rescinded.

=== Save the Internet Act ===
The Act, which was introduced into Congress on March 8, 2019, sought to reverse the December 17, 2017 FCC order to repeal the 2015 Open Internet Order and codify it into law. FFTF's ‘The Whole Internet is Watching,’ protest provided a widget that let people and sites like Etsy, Tumblr, Twitter, Pornhub, BoingBoing, and GitHub embed the live stream of the House markup hearing on their home pages. The group said a record 300,000 tuned in to the event. When the full vote was held on April 10, FFTF reported registering six million views on their Twitch site. The bill passed the House on April 10, 2019.

=== Opposition to WCIT-12 ===
Along with AccessNow.org, the group has launched an online campaign opposing the changes proposed at the 2012 World Conference on International Telecommunications. The organization believes the changes would threaten the openness of the Internet.

== Surveillance and privacy campaigns ==
=== Reset the Net ===
In response to reports of mass surveillance by the National Security Agency (NSA), Fight for the Future called for increased privacy protections on the internet to decrease the efficiency of surveillance efforts. The organization participated in a day of action on June 5, 2014, to protest NSA surveillance, the anniversary of the date the first Edward Snowden story broke detailing the government's PRISM program, based on documents leaked by the former NSA contractor.

=== Restore the Fourth ===
On July 4, 2013, FFTF helped to organize ‘Restore the Fourth’ rallies in 100 cities across the US to protest against NSA, PRISM, and government spying.

=== Don’t Break Our Phones rallies ===
On Feb 14, 2016, FFTF organized rallies in front of 40 Apple stores around the nation, putting the spotlight on how tech giants are under increasing pressure to share their data with the government.

=== Broadband privacy billboards ===
In August 2016, Fight for the Future crowdfunded "You Betrayed Us" billboards in the districts of three Republican House leaders—Representative Marsha Blackburn of Tennessee, who heads a communications subcommittee; Representative Kevin McCarthy of California, the majority leader; and Speaker Paul D. Ryan of Wisconsin-who had voted to reverse broadband privacy laws enacted by the Obama FCC. The billboards included information on how much money the pictured lawmaker had received from the telecomm lobby.

=== Chelsea Manning ===
After whistleblower Chelsea Manning was jailed for disclosing to WikiLeaks nearly 750,000 military and diplomatic documents, she was imprisoned from 2010 until 2017 when her sentence was commuted. FFTF laid the groundwork for her release and crowdraising $140,000 in post-prison support. When Manning was again jailed on March 8, 2019, for her continued refusal to testify before a grand jury against Julian Assange, FFTF called for her immediate release. She was released on March 12, 2019.

=== Anti-ICE protests ===
After Salesforce signed a $40 million contract with ICE and U.S. Border Patrol, through NoTechForIce.com, FFTF brought together groups like Color of Change, RAICES, and Mijente, to demand that the company cancel their contract with Border Patrol. A protest was held during the company's flagship Dreamforce convention in San Francisco, where more than 170,000 people were in attendance. Salesforce ultimately agreed to meet with a group representing frontline communities and has since hired its first Chief Ethical and Humane Use Officer. FFTF publicized an internal email leaked from Microsoft-owned GitHub, the world's largest software development platform, that disclosed the renewal of a $200,000 ICE contract. The email prompted hundreds of the company's employees to demand the company cancel the contract. In October 2019, the group's NoMusicForICE campaign prompted more than 1,000 independent artists to call for the boycott of Amazon-backed events and partnerships over its contracts with ICE and other federal agencies.

=== Facial recognition ===
FFTF's BanFacialRecognition was the first major national campaign calling for a federal ban on law enforcement use of facial recognition technology; it has been endorsed by 30 major organizations. With the help of musicians including Rage Against the Machine's Tom Morello, Speedy Ortiz's Sadie Dupuis, Amanda Palmer, and rappers Atmosphere, the organization was able to get more than 40 of the world's largest music festivals to sign on, including SXSW, Coachella, Lollapalooza, and Bonarroo. Its AirlinePrivacy.com campaign called on airlines to drop facial recognition screening in partnership with U.S. border control and to book directly with companies that are not using it. Starting in 2023, US airlines have adopted facial recognition technology to eliminate the necessity of presenting a passport for boarding flights.

=== Amazon Ring ===
In response to Amazon Ring's practice of giving local law enforcement access to customers’ camera-enabled doorbells, FFTF launched a campaign which prompted Amazon to release the full list of 400+ cities where partnerships exist. More than 30 civil rights and immigration organizations participated in the campaign. FFTF's InvestigateAmazon.com campaign demanded that Congress investigate the threats the surveillance-based business model poses to security, privacy and civil liberties.

=== ISP sale of customer location data ===
After a Motherboard report found that a bounty hunter could purchase location data from Sprint, T-Mobile, and AT&T for as little as $300, FFTF organized a rapid response campaign calling on Congress and the FCC to investigate the dangers of the sale of sensitive personal information. Through this campaign, 20,000 people called for an investigation. By May 2019, all major carriers agreed to stop the practice.

== Other activities ==
=== Opposition to the Trans-Pacific Partnership ===
In the summer of 2016, Fight for the Future teamed up with musician Tom Morello's label Firebrand Records to launch a Rock Against the TPP multi-city tour, featuring concerts, teach-ins, and protests of the Trans-Pacific Partnership.

=== Gamers for Freedom ===
After Blizzard Entertainment, a top video game company, sought to suspend Chung Ng Wai, a professional gamer in Hong Kong, for expressing his support for Hong Kong protesters and refused to award him his prize money, FFTF organized Gamers for Freedom. The campaign teamed up with gamers, redditors, and others to protest the action and encouraged subscribers to cancel their membership.

=== HelloVote ===
In the 2016 elections, FFTF built HelloVote, the first ever SMS and Facebook messenger chatbot for registering to vote and helping others to get to the polls.

== Controversies ==
David Lowery of the University of Georgia accused Fight For The Future of being an "astroturf" organization funded by Silicon Valley interests disguised as a grassroots organization. Federal tax documents have shown large donations from major corporate backers including Union Square Ventures and Yelp among others.
