= TestPAC =

Political action committee

- Formation: 2012
- Purpose: net neutrality, civil liberties
- Headquarters: Phoenix, AZ
- Treasurer: Mitch Manzella
- Website: http://www.testpac.org

TestPAC (formerly known as "TestPAC, Please Ignore") is a crowdfunded, non-connected political action committee in the United States. Its Chairman is Jeromie Whalen. It is best known for its 2012 campaign to defeat incumbent U.S. Representative Lamar Smith (R-TX) in response to the Congressman's introduction of the Stop Online Piracy Act and H.R.1981

== History ==
TestPAC was registered with the Federal Election Commission on January 31, 2012. TestPAC started when several members of the Reddit community initiated a netroots boycott of GoDaddy.com and "Operation Pull Ryan", where Reddit members helped Paul Ryan's opponent, Rob Zerban raise $15,000 in 48 hours. When Ryan eventually came out in opposition of SOPA, activists Andy Posterick and Jeromie Whalen formed a political action committee for potential future campaigns.

TestPAC was originally registered as "TestPAC, Please Ignore." The name is a play on an inside joke on Reddit; the site's most popular post ever was titled "Test Post, Please Ignore."

== Overview ==
TestPAC crowdsources its mission, goals and campaigns from its member-base on the PAC's discussion forum on Reddit. Although most decisions are made among PAC members, major decisions are put to an official vote on the PAC's website. So far, the organization has held two official votes: one asking members whether to campaign against Lamar Smith and one to decide on a concept for a billboard advertisement.

TestPAC primarily relies on crowdfunding as a means of fundraising and solicits donations on social media websites such as Facebook, Twitter, and Reddit.

== Campaigns ==
In February 2012, TestPAC members voted between removing 13-term incumbent Lamar Smith from office or campaign finance reform as the PAC's first target issue. With 63% of the vote, members elected to start a campaign against Smith. The campaign was officially titled "Mr. Smith Comes Back From Washington". TestPAC chose the campaign primarily because of Smith's support of the controversial Stop Online Piracy Act and his introduction of H.R. 1981. Its strategy was to encourage registered Republicans and Democrats to vote against Smith in the 29 May 2012 semi-open Republican primary. On 4 April 2012, TestPAC released its first television commercial. Federal Election Commission records show that TEST PAC (committee ID C00511055) made $18,737.22 in independent expenditures in 2012. In the 29 May 2012 Republican primary for Texas's 21st congressional district, Smith won 52,383 votes (76.64%), ahead of Richard Mack with 10,104 votes (14.78%) and Richard Morgan with 5,866 votes (8.58%). The committee is now listed by the Federal Election Commission as an administratively terminated, nonqualified, unauthorised PAC.

== Leadership ==
Test PAC's leadership structure is volunteer-based and open to anyone. The PAC lists several officers on its website who organize operational elements of the PAC's campaigns and manage day-to-day operations of the organization. According to the Federal Election Commission, Andrew J Posterick is registered as the PAC Treasurer.
