= TechCongress =

American technology policy fellowship

- Founder: Travis Moore
- Services: Fellowship
- Website: www.techcongress.io

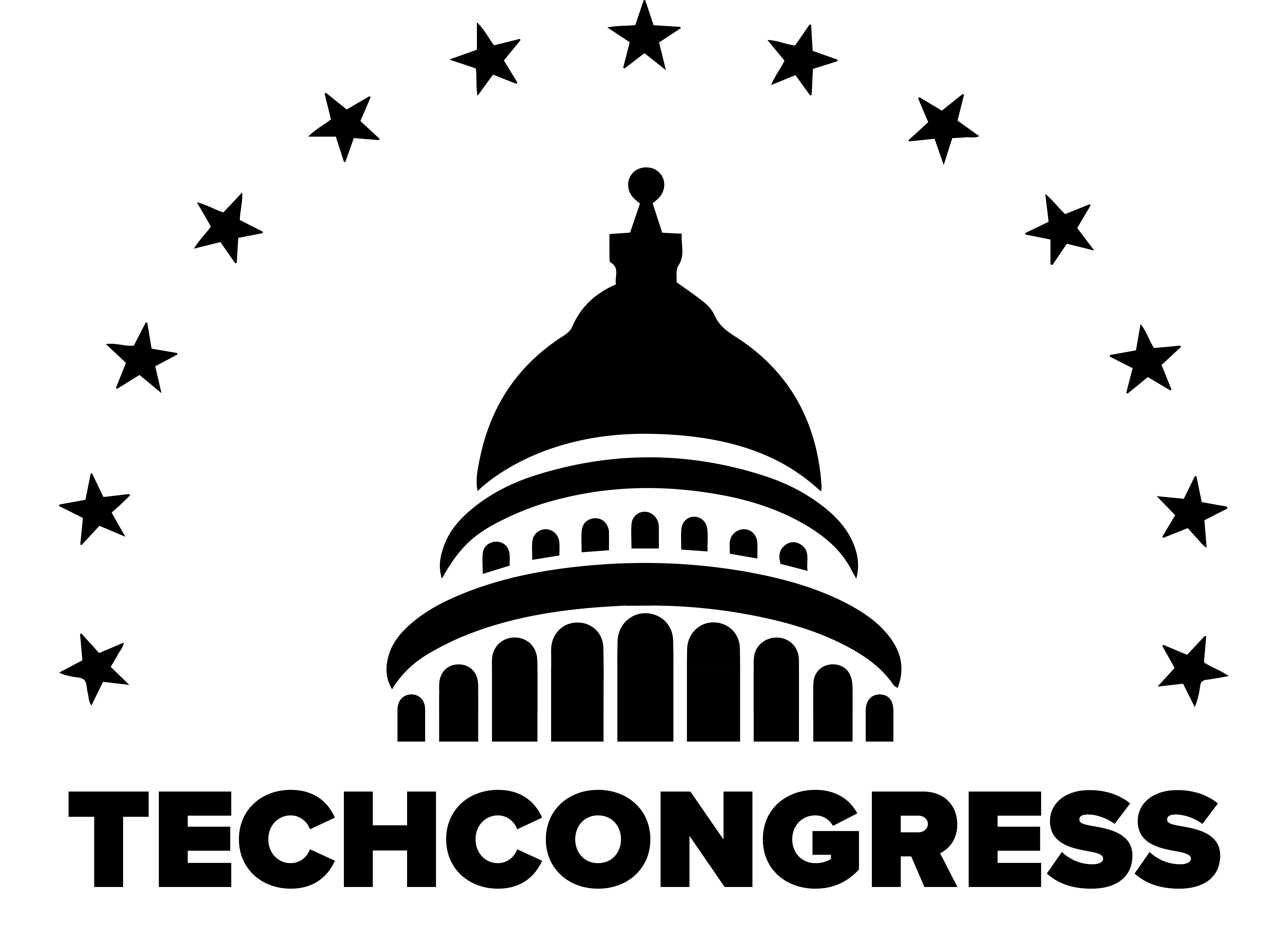
TechCongress logo

TechCongress is a technology policy fellowship associated with the US Congress created by Travis Moore. Tech experts and professionals spend one year with relevant Members or Committees in the House and Senate. The fellowship's goal is helping Congress aim for more informed decisions regarding technology and policy by allowing Congress to gain technical insight. At present, only 6 out of 15,000 staffers have a technical background. Fellows have worked for offices like House Speaker Nancy Pelosi, Senate Leader John Thune, Senator Elizabeth Warren, Senator Mark Warner, Senator Tom Cotton, and the House Appropriations Committee.

== Background ==
Travis Moore founded the fellowship as a solution to some of the issues he witnessed in his six years of experience in the House of Representatives, working for former Rep. Henry Waxman (D-Calif.)

TechCongress used an Indiegogo campaign to get seed funding for the fellowship. A total sum of $8,000 was raised in the first year. In 2022, the program was expanded due to a $2.5 million investment from the Knight Foundation.

It invites a wide variety of individuals with different backgrounds to be part of the fellowship. Fellows mainly come from technical backgrounds, involving work in the private sector.

Fellows are placed into different governmental bodies. They have a chance to work in the office of a member, committee, or a congressional support agency. Participants receive an $96,750 stipend for service as well as reimbursements for relocation, travel and health insurance. The fellowship lasts one year.

== Impact ==
The program has supported over 100 fellows in various Congressional offices who have worked on legislation related to artificial intelligence, cybersecurity, technology procurement, modernization efforts, open government.
