= Intellectual Property Attache Act =

Legislation

- Long title: "To promote a level playing field for American innovators abroad and American job creation by improving the intellectual property attache program, and coordinating and aligning intellectual property policy with compelling economic interests of the United States and freedom."
- Acronyms (colloquial): IPAA

Legislative history
- Introduced in the House by Rep. Lamar Smith on 2012-07-10

The Intellectual Property Attache Act (IPAA) was unveiled by U.S. Representative Lamar S. Smith on July 9, 2012. This act was a section of the previously unsuccessful Stop Online Piracy Act (SOPA) which did not pass its markup by the House Judiciary Committee. The bill's aim was to increase the presence of intellectual property attaches around the world. These attaches would play the role of intellectual property "diplomats" for the United States, encouraging other countries to enforce copyright laws. The attaches, currently linked to the US Patent and Trademark Office, would be set up in the Commerce Department.
