= Protecting Lawful Streaming Act =

United States law prohibiting large-scale streaming of copyrighted material

Protecting Lawful Streaming Act of 2020
- Announced in: the 116th United States Congress
- Sponsored by: Thom Tillis
- Number of co-sponsors: 9

Codification
- Titles affected: Title 18
- U.S.C. sections created: 18 U.S.C. § 2319C

Legislative history
- Introduced in the Senate by Thom Tillis on December 10, 2020

The Protecting Lawful Streaming Act of 2020 is a United States law that makes it a felony to engage in large-scale streaming of copyright material. The bill was introduced by Senator Thom Tillis on December 10, 2020. The bill was added to the omnibus Consolidated Appropriations Act, 2021 (CAA), and is located in Division Q, Title II, § 211 of the CAA. The CAA passed the house and the senate on December 21, 2020, and was signed into law by President Donald Trump on December 27, 2020.

== Background ==
Modern computer and information technology has sufficiently advanced, most notably around 2010, to allow streaming media to be an effective way of sharing video content on the Internet. This has led to a large amount of copyright infringement through unlawful redistribution, commonly referred to as "piracy". Piracy websites, typically running outside of United States jurisdiction, are created to share copyrighted films and television shows for free without consent of the copyright owners. U.S. Representative Lamar Smith in response to concerns from groups like the Motion Picture Association of America introduced the proposed Stop Online Piracy Act (SOPA) in 2011 which would have made it a criminal act to stream and share copyrighted material, granting the Department of Justice special powers to seize the domain(s) of sites suspected of infringing on SOPA. While supported by a number of entertainment and labor groups, SOPA was widely criticized by technology companies and free speech advocates for creating a chilling effect on web content and wide-scale online blackouts were held in protest. Due to the backlash, SOPA was pulled from consideration, permitting copyright owners to seek only civil penalties against these sites.

In announcing the bill, Senator Thom Tillis state that by 2020 these sites were taking away more than US$30 billion from copyright holders annually, justifying the need for closing the loophole.

== Legislative function ==
The bill specifically targets commercial or for-profit websites that operate as "digital transmission service[s]", that primarily function to stream copyrighted material without authorization of the copyright holders.

An example of one such website is NFLBite. The website provides its visitors with unauthorized sources that stream National Football League (NFL) games for free. The NFL has taken NFLBite to court through civil lawsuits in attempts to stop their streaming of full NFL games, but are unable to seek criminal charges due to limitations of U.S. copyright law. The bill adds to Title 18 of the United States Code that would make operating these sites a criminal felony, with a maximum penalty of up to ten years imprisonment for repeated offenses, and additional fines if convicted. This brings the act of offering such unauthorized streaming media at a large scale to the same scope of penalty as for offering illegal downloads or physical copies of the same content, closing the streaming media loophole.

Tillis stated that the bill is tailored to specifically target the websites themselves, and not "those who may use the sites nor those individuals who access pirated streams or unwittingly stream unauthorized copies of copyrighted works". Tillis' office and the tech advocacy group Public Knowledge clarified that the bill was not aimed at video game live streamers on platforms like Twitch, or their viewers.

== Legislative history ==
Tillis, who serves as the chairman of the Senate Judiciary Subcommittee on Intellectual Property, first discussed the bill to be introduced with the CASE Act and the Trademark Modernization Act as part of a package to be included with the Consolidated Appropriations Act, 2021 on December 4, 2020, according to congressional aides that had spoken to the website Protocol. The text of Tillis' bill had not be available, but according to Protocol, it "would provide the DOJ with the authority to charge commercial enterprises that are streaming certain kinds of works with felony copyright infringement". Similar concerns were raised by an article in The American Prospect. The bill's intent raised concerns from tech companies and free speech advocates as it was not clear if this would also target individual users, including online streamers.

Tillis assured those concerned that the bill was narrowly tailored towards commercial sites and would not criminalize individual users. He specifically stated that information in The American Prospect article was "false and inaccurate", and the bill was "drafted to not sweep in normal practices by online service providers and good faith business disputes". Tillis released the text of the bill to the public on December 10, 2020. Public Knowledge, who had raised concerns prior to this, said that after reviewing the bill's language that they consider the bill to be narrowly tailored and thanked Tillis for "working to prevent risk to end users and legitimate streamers and streaming platforms". The Computer & Communications Industry Association, which represents technology companies, also did not oppose the compromise language of the bill.

The bill's bipartisan co-sponsors included Patrick Leahy, Marsha Blackburn, Mazie Hirono, Catherine Cortez Masto, John Cornyn, Richard Blumenthal, Chris Coons, Kelly Loeffler, and David Perdue. The bill, along with the CASE Act and Trademark Modernization Act, were incorporated into the text of the December 21, 2020, version of the Consolidated Appropriations Act. Trump stated opposition to the combined bill and did not immediately sign it but ultimately signed it into law on December 27, 2020.

== See also ==
- Commercial Felony Streaming Act
- PROTECT IP Act
- Protecting Children from Internet Pornographers Act of 2011
- Stop Online Piracy Act
