= Consolidated Appropriations Act, 2021 =

Appropriations and pandemic relief bill

- Long title: An act making consolidated appropriations for the fiscal year ending September 30, 2021, providing coronavirus emergency response and relief, and for other purposes.
- Enacted by: the 116th United States Congress
- Effective: December 27, 2020

Citations
- Public law: Pub. L. 116–260 (text) (PDF)

Legislative history
- Introduced in the House as H.R. 133 (United States-Mexico Economic Partnership Act) by Henry Cuellar (D-TX) on January 3, 2019; Committee consideration by United States House Committee on Foreign Affairs; Passed the House on January 10, 2019 (voice vote); Passed the Senate on January 15, 2020 (unanimous consent) with amendment; House agreed to Senate amendment on December 21, 2020 (327–85 and 359–53 as the Consolidated Appropriations Act, 2021) with further amendment; Senate agreed to House amendment on December 21, 2020 (92–6); Signed into law by President Donald Trump on December 27, 2020

The Consolidated Appropriations Act, 2021 (H.R. 133) is a $2.3 trillion spending bill that combines $900 billion in stimulus relief for the COVID-19 pandemic in the United States with a $1.4 trillion omnibus spending bill for the 2021 federal fiscal year (combining 12 separate annual appropriations bills) and prevents a government shutdown. The bill is one of the largest spending measures ever enacted, surpassing the $2.2 trillion CARES Act, enacted in March 2020. The legislation is the first bill to address the pandemic since April 2020. According to the Senate Historical Office, at 5,593 pages, the legislation is the longest bill ever passed by Congress.

The bill was passed by both houses of Congress on December 21, 2020, with large bipartisan majorities in support. The bill was the product of weeks of intense negotiations and compromise between Democrats and Republicans during the lame-duck session. After initially criticizing the bill, President Donald Trump signed it into law on December 27.

== Legislative history ==
=== Background ===
Following the approval of some $2.5 trillion in stimulus in March and April, Senate majority leader Mitch McConnell cautioned against any further spending. (Note: On May 11, McConnell revealed that he was "in constant communication with the White House and if we decide to go forward we'll go forward together".) From then until mid-October, Republicans and Democrats proposed a series of prospective bills, with support mostly along party lines, and each side voicing criticism of the other party's inclusion of special interests. In September, a non-pandemic-related spending bill was passed to avoid a government shutdown, allowing Congress to focus on a separate relief bill. On November 4, McConnell spoke in favor of passing stimulus during the lame-duck session in November and December. Two days later, Larry Kudlow, the director of President Donald Trump's National Economic Council, indicated that, like McConnell, the Trump administration was interested in a targeted package smaller than $2–3 trillion.

=== Negotiations ===
On December 1, McConnell implied that some form of relief would come in the spending bill for the fiscal year of 2021. The next day, House speaker Nancy Pelosi and Senate minority leader Chuck Schumer endorsed a $908 billion bipartisan plan. (Note: This initially planned $288 billion in small business aid, $160 billion to state and local governments, $180 billion for $300 weekly unemployment benefits until March, $82 billion for education, $45 billion for transportation, and $16 billion for vaccines and testing. It would also provide temporary liability protections to give states time to develop their own policies.) A number of Republican senators subsequently endorsed it, with Lindsey Graham saying he had discussed it "extensively" with Trump.

On December 8, Mnuchin presented a $916 billion counter-proposal, which Pelosi and Schumer called "unacceptable" because it reduced funding for unemployment insurance from $180 billion to $40 billion, in exchange for a one-time $600 direct payment for adults and children. (Note: On December 13, Trump stated that "I want to see checks ... for more money than they're talking about going to people." On December 17, White House aids reportedly stopped from him from publicly asking Congress to increase direct payments in the current negotiations to between $1,200 and $2,000.)

On December 11, a one-week stopgap spending bill was signed into law to allow more time to negotiate stimulus.

The next week, two controversial measures from both parties were moved into a separate $160 billion bill called the Bipartisan State and Local Support and Small Business Protection Act of 2020. This bill included the Democrat's request for more state and local government aid, and the Republican's request for a strong COVID lawsuit liability shield for businesses.

Senators Josh Hawley and Bernie Sanders planned to bring to vote on December 18 a proposal for direct payments of the same amount provided by the CARES Act ($1,200 per adult making less than $75,000 annually and $500 per child), but this was blocked by Senator Ron Johnson (R-WI).

On December 18, a 48-hour stopgap bill was passed to keep the government funded through the weekend, with a one-day stopgap bill passed to prolong voting until that Monday, December 21.

At the request of Senator Pat Toomey, the bill was modified to require congressional approval of future emergency lending through the Fed, and to rescind about $429 billion in unused CARES Act funding.

In order to pass the bill more quickly, Congress used H.R. 133, previously the United States-Mexico Economic Partnership Act, as a legislative vehicle, amending the bill to contain its current text.

=== Challenges ===
During the last few days, logistical challenges arose as the bill, which consisted of some 5,500 pages of text, proved difficult to physically assemble due to printer malfunctions and a corrupted computer file. The file, representing the education portion of the bill, posed a problem in that all portions had to be combined into one overall file. Senator John Thune remarked, "Unfortunately, it's a bad time to have a computer glitch." The delays meant that the two votes in Congress were delayed late into the evening of December 21.

Several members of both parties voiced unhappiness with such a large bill being presented to them with little time to understand what was inside it. Representative Alexandria Ocasio-Cortez wrote, "It's not good enough to hear about what's in the bill. Members of Congress need to see & read the bills we are expected to vote on," and compared the process to "hostage-taking", while Representative Michael Burgess said, "This is a tough way to legislate, to save everything til the very end and then pass a very large bill." Senator Ted Cruz tweeted that the whole process was "ABSURD".

=== Congress passes the bill ===
On the evening of December 21 the votes were held, with large, bipartisan majorities supporting them. The bill was split into two parts in the House, with one portion passing 327–85 and another portion 359–53. The first vote, which included funding for federal agencies, was opposed by 41 Democrats and 43 Republicans. The stimulus portion was in the latter vote, and was supported by Democrats by a 230–2 margin and Republicans by a 128–50 margin (two independents made up the rest). Following that, there was a single vote in the Senate, which passed 92–6.

Also on the night of December 21, Trump signed a weeklong stopgap bill through December 28, avoiding a shutdown while the 5,593-page legislation was being processed. It was the biggest bill ever passed by Congress in terms of length of text. On December 24, Congress began the official process of sending the bill to Trump.

=== Presidential dispute and signing ===
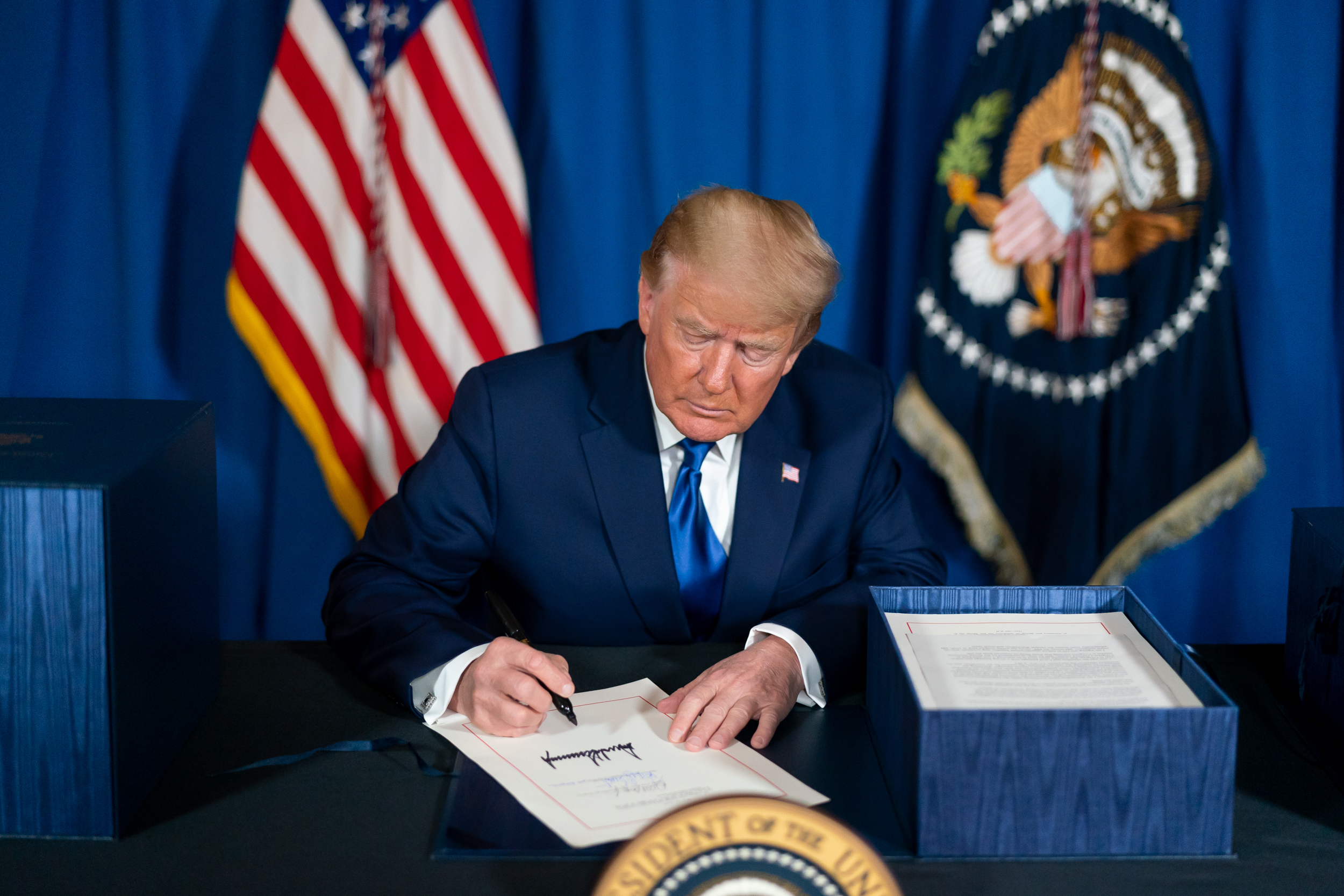
President Trump signs the bill in Mar-a-Lago.

Trump was largely absent from the final series of negotiations on the pandemic relief and omnibus legislation, as he had been focusing almost exclusively on promoting his claims that the 2020 presidential election had been stolen from him. Trump's Treasury Secretary Steven Mnuchin and other Trump administration officials were involved in the negotiations at each stage and expressed support for the final deal.

In a video released on the evening of December 22, a day after the bill's passage, Trump indicated his dissatisfaction with the bill, calling it a "disgrace" and criticizing it for including what he called "wasteful and unnecessary" spending (Trump complained about the inclusion of funds for foreign aid, the Smithsonian Institution, and the Kennedy Center) and not enough pandemic relief, (Note: Fox News's Fox & Friends, a favorite program of the president, had that morning criticized the bill's large number of unexpected items that were not directly related to government funding or pandemic relief. A Fox News article from December 23 speculates that the president may have gotten confused between provisions of the pandemic relief and those of the omnibus package.) calling the $600 individual payments "ridiculously low". Trump's last-minute statement shocked Congress and surprised administration officials, including Mnuchin, who was heavily involved in the negotiations. In the video, Trump complained about various spending line items in the bill for not being related to COVID-19, but these expenditures were part of the regular annual (fiscal year 2021) appropriations, not the COVID-19 stimulus portion of the bill. Moreover, the budget items that Trump complained about were part of Trump's own budget proposal for the year, and were similar to budget provisions in previous budgets signed by Trump.

Senate majority leader Mitch McConnell said that, if Trump vetoed the bill, the Senate was prepared to convene on December 29 for an override vote.

On the night of December 22, Trump asked Congress to send him a version of the bill with $2,000 rather than $600 individual payments. House speaker Pelosi and House majority leader Steny Hoyer signaled Democratic support of this change, while Senate minority leader Schumer encouraged Trump to sign the current bill, stating that "we're glad to pass more aid" at a later date. If no agreement can be reached, the government may shut down, and according to Trump, "the next administration will have to deliver a COVID relief package and maybe that administration will be me". It was speculated that Trump might use a pocket veto.

The president left for his Mar-a-Lago estate on December 23, leaving his intentions unclear. On December 24, House Democrats tried to pass, by unanimous consent, legislation to increase the size of the stimulus checks to $2,000, but House Republicans blocked the proposed increase. Many figures in both parties urged Trump to sign the bill, and planned fallback strategies to keep the government open in case he did not.

Two kinds of pandemic relief payments, Pandemic Unemployment Assistance and Pandemic Emergency Unemployment Compensation, expired on the morning of December 27. On the evening of December 27, after coming under heavy pressure from Democrats and Republicans, Trump signed the bill into law without his demands being met. Upon signing the bill, Trump released a statement containing various false statements and grievances. Trump indicated that he would create "a redlined version" of the bill accompanied by a "formal rescission request to Congress insisting that those funds be removed from the bill." Congress is not expected to act on this request. Trump's delay of nearly a week in signing the bill held up $900 billion in emergency relief funds, and because he did not sign the bill a day earlier, millions of Americans enrolled in unemployment programs were unlikely to receive a payment for the final week of 2020.

=== CASH Act ===
On December 28, the House passed the Caring for Americans with Supplemental Help Act (CASH Act), a standalone bill to increase direct payments to $2,000 for those who make under $75,000 annually. It would phase out for those who make up to $115,000. Projected to cost $464 billion, the House passed the bill by just over the two-thirds majority vote necessary, under a suspension of the rules.

On December 29, Senate minority leader Chuck Schumer moved to pass the bill by unanimous consent, but was blocked by Senate majority leader Mitch McConnell. Later that day, McConnell introduced legislation combining increased payments with two other Trump demands: a repeal of Section 230 of the Communications Decency Act (which the president had wanted to include in the National Defense Authorization Act for Fiscal Year 2021), and the establishment of a voter fraud study commission. (Note: In the wake of his loss in the 2020 election, Trump has repeatedly made baseless claims of fraud and demanded "an investigation".) McConnell later claimed that Trump had requested these items to be tied to the stimulus checks, but there is no record of this. Senator Chris Murphy (D-CT) has cautioned against sinking the $2,000 stimulus checks with "poison pills". On December 31, Schumer again tried to pass the bill by unanimous consent, which was again blocked by McConnell. Schumer suggested voting on the president's other two requests separately.

On December 30, McConnell criticized the CASH Act for failing to adequately phase out higher-income earners. (Note: McConnell has previously floated the possibility of a stimulus check for families who make less than $40,000 annually.) Bernie Sanders (with Josh Hawley's backing) tried to force a roll-call vote on the law by filibustering a vote to override Trump's veto of the 2021 defense bill. On January 1, 2021, Schumer again called for a vote on $2,000 stimulus checks but was blocked by a Republican senator—ending prospects for the act to be approved by the 116th Congress. On January 6, after Democrats won control of the Senate by winning two Senate seats in Georgia the night before, Schumer said the $2,000 payments were a top priority for him in the 117th Congress. President-elect Joe Biden also supported increasing the payments to $2,000.

== Provisions ==
=== Coronavirus relief ===
The Coronavirus Response and Relief Supplemental Appropriations Act, 2021 (CRRSAA) is Division M of the legislation, and Division N contains additional coronavirus provisions. It is a follow-on to such actions as the CARES Act and Paycheck Protection Program passed in March 2020, and comes after eight months of mostly little progress in negotiations between the different parties and houses of Congress. Many of the negotiations made little progress due to strongly held policy differences being contested. The incumbent president, having lost his bid for re-election, generally played little role in the later stages of the discussions.

The pandemic relief portion of the bill was estimated at about $900 billion by the Associated Press. On January 14, the Congressional Budget Office released its scoring with Division M as $184 billion and Division N as $682 billion, for a total of $866 billion with their breakdowns. The Associated Press' estimates were:

- $325 billion for small businesses
  - $284 billion in forgivable loans via the Paycheck Protection Program (Note: The New York Times notes that some businesses will profit from a "double dip" into this program, as they can report the extra money as a tax write-off.)
  - $20 billion for businesses in low-income communities
  - $15 billion for economically endangered live venues, movie theaters and museums
  - Expanded employee retention tax credit: gross receipts threshold reduced to 20%; small employer cap raised to 500; PPP borrowers eligible; worth up to $7,000 per employee per quarter.
- $166 billion for a $600 stimulus check, for most Americans with an adjusted gross income lower than $75,000 (Note: Reduced payments will be provided for those who make up to $87,000 annually. Income is based on 2019 tax reporting. Adult dependents do not qualify.)
- $120 billion for an extension of increased federal unemployment benefits ($300 per week until March 14, 2021)
- $82 billion for schools and universities, including $54 billion to public K-12 schools, $23 billion for higher education; $4 billion to a Governors Emergency Education Relief Fund; and slightly under $1 billion for Native American schools
- $69 billion for vaccines, testing, and health providers
  - Vaccine and treatment procurement and distribution, as well as a strategic stockpile, received over $30 billion
  - Testing, contact tracing, and mitigation received $22 billion
  - Health care providers received $9 billion
  - Mental health received $4.5 billion
- $25 billion for a federal aid to state and local governments for rental assistance programs (also covering rent arrears, utilities, and home energy costs)
- $13 billion to increase the monthly Supplemental Nutrition Assistance Program (SNAP/food stamp) benefit by 15% through June 30, 2021
- $13 billion round of direct payments to the farming and ranching industry, including
  - About $5 billion for payments of $20 per acre for row crop producers, which (according to an American Farm Bureau Federation analysis) would go to producers of corn ($1.8 billion), soybeans ($1.7 billion), wheat ($890 million), and cotton ($240 million).
  - Up to $1 billion for livestock and poultry farmers, plus certain "plus-up" payments for cattle producers
  - $470 million for dairy producers, plus additional $400 million for the USDA to purchase milk for processing into dairy products for donation to food banks
  - $60 million for small meat and poultry processors
- $10 billion for child care (specifically, the Child Care Development Block Grant program)
- $10 billion for the U.S. Postal Service (in the form of forgiveness of a previous federal loan)

The legislation also extends the Centers for Disease Control and Prevention-imposed eviction moratorium (halting evictions for failure to pay rent for tenants with annual incomes of less than $99,000) to January 31, 2021; the moratorium had initially been set to expire at the end of 2020.

=== Regular appropriations ===
The regular annual appropriations bills comprise Divisions A through L of the bill, and totals about $1.4 trillion. Among these provisions are:

- $1.375 billion for the Mexico–United States border wall
- Hyde Amendment, which prohibits federal funds from being used for abortions (Note: This is not actually an "amendment" or a specific piece of legislation. Prohibitions against funding abortions are scattered throughout the bill in multiple different divisions.)

==== Division A – Agriculture, rural development, FDA ====
- $114 billion for the Supplemental Nutrition Assistance Program (SNAP) and $25.118 billion for Child Nutrition Programs, including $42 million for the Summer Electronic Benefits Transfer program (including an expansion to new states), and $30 million for school meal equipment grants, and $6 billion in discretionary Women, Infants and Children funding
- $23.4 billion for agriculture, rural development, the FDA, and related agencies (an increase of $217 million from FY 2020
- $7 billion to expand broadband access for students, families and unemployed workers, including $300 million for rural broadband and $250 million for telehealth

==== Division B – Commerce, justice, science ====
- Justice spending, including:
  - $33.8 billion overall for the U.S. Department of Justice (an increase of $1.18 billion from FY 2020)
  - $3.385 billion in law enforcement grants (an increase of $107 million from FY 2020), including $513.5 million for Violence Against Women Act programs, $484 million for Byrne JAG, $386 million for the Community Oriented Policing Services Program, $244 million for the State Criminal Alien Assistance Program, $189 million for sexual assault kit and DNA evidence backlogs, $100 million for Second Chance Act prisoner reentry programs, $526.5 million for opioid crisis grant programs, $132 million for the STOP School Violence Act, and $85 million for National Instant Criminal Background Check improvement grants.
  - $409.4 million for First Step Act programs
  - $5 million for the creation of a database to track police misconduct
- $23.3 billion for NASA

==== Division C – Defense ====
- $695.9 billion for the U.S. Department of Defense (a decrease of $9.7 billion from FY 2020)
  - $68.7 billion for the Overseas Contingency Operations fund
  - A 3% rise in military pay
  - $2.3 billion for a second Virginia-class attack submarine, a key priority for certain legislators who have pressed for the construction of two attack subs per year
  - $2 billion for the Space Force

==== Division D – Energy and water development ====
- $39.62 billion for the U.S. Department of Energy (an increase of $1 billion from FY 2020)

==== Division E – Financial services, general government ====
- $13.49 billion for the U.S. Department of the Treasury (an increase of $429.9 million from FY 2020), including
  - $11.92 billion to the Internal Revenue Service
  - $270 million for the Community Development Financial Institutions Fund
  - $175 million for the Office of Terrorism and Financial Intelligence
  - $170 million for the Treasury Inspector General for Tax Administration
  - $127 million for Financial Crimes Enforcement Network
  - $41 million for the Treasury Inspector General
  - $25 million for the digitization of savings bonds records
  - $20 million for Committee on Foreign Investment in the United States programs and enforcement

==== Division F – Homeland security ====
- $51.88 billion for the U.S. Department of Homeland Security (an increase of $1.41 billion from FY 2020, if offsetting collections and major disaster funding are excluded)
- $21.67 billion for the Federal Emergency Management Agency (a decrease of $604.1 million from FY 2020, but $12.32 billion more than Trump's budget request)

==== Division G – Interior, environment ====
- $13.7 billion in discretionary funding for the U.S. Department of the Interior (an increase of $186 million from FY 2020), $3.12 billion for the National Park Service, $1.67 billion for the Bureau of Reclamation (water resources and Western drought programs), $1.27 billion for the Bureau of Land Management; $222.6 million for the Office of Surface Mining Reclamation and Enforcement, $515 million for the Payment in Lieu of Taxes program; funding for the Land and Water Conservation Fund
- $9.2 billion to the Environmental Protection Agency (an increase of $180 million from FY 2020)

==== Division H – Labor, health, education ====
- Labor funding, including:
  - $9.4 billion for the U.S. Department of Labor Employment and Training Administration, including $2.85 billion for Workforce Innovation and Opportunity Act training formula grants
  - $592 million for the Occupational Safety and Health Administration, $246 million for the Wage and Hour Division, $185 million for the Registered Apprenticeship Program, $96 million for the International Labor Affairs Bureau, $45 million for the Strengthening Community College Training Grants program
- $97 billion for "base discretionary funding" Health and Human Services, plus $24.7 billion in discretionary funding for the Administration for Children and Families, $42.9 billion for the National Institutes of Health, $7.9 billion for the Centers for Disease Control and Prevention, $5.9 billion for the Child Care and Development Block Grant, $2.8 billion for the Public Health and Social Services Emergency Fund, $6 billion for the Substance Abuse and Mental Health Services Administration, $7.5 billion for the Health Resources and Services Administration, $2.4 billion for the Ryan White HIV/AIDS program, $745 million for the Community Services Block Grant, $551 million to the Office of the HHS Secretary, and $62 million for the Office of Minority Health.
- Education spending, including:
  - $73.5 billion for the U.S. Department of Education (an increase of $785 million from FY 2020).
  - Funding for formula grants under the Elementary and Secondary Education Act, including $16.5 billion for Title I grants to low-income schools, $14.1 billion for Individuals with Disabilities Education, $2.1 billion for Title II teacher professional development state grants, $1.2 billion for Title IV Student Support and Academic Enrichment Grants, $10.7 billion for Head Start and $5.9 billion for Child Care and Development Block Grant, $1.3 billion for Career and Technical Education State Grants, and $1.1 billion for Federal TRIO Programs. All the formula grant programs' appropriations represented an increase from FY 2020.

==== Division I – Legislative branch ====
- $5.3 billion for the legislative branch, including $757.3 million for the Library of Congress, $675.1 million for the Architect of the Capitol, $661.1 million for the Government Accountability Office, $515.5 million for the Capitol Police, $117 million for the Government Publishing Office, $57.3 million for the Congressional Budget Office, $5 million for the Office of the Attending Physician, and $2 million for the House Modernization Initiatives Account. The bill does not include any pay increase for members of Congress.

==== Division J – Military construction and veterans affairs ====
- $243 billion in mandatory and discretionary funding for the U.S. Department of Veterans Affairs (including advance appropriations from the preceding year). VA funding increased by almost 12% from the previous fiscal year. VA appropriations include $10.3 billion for veterans' mental health (including $312 million specifically for suicide prevention), $3.2 billion to address the Veterans Benefits Administration backlog of disability claims, $16 billion for MISSION Act community care, $2.6 billion for VA electronic health record modernization, $1.9 billion for programs addressing veteran homelessness, and $1.2 billion for the Caregivers Program. The act also provides $130 billion in advance appropriations for fiscal year 2022 to ensure continuity of VA funding and prevent a future partial government shutdown from affecting the VA.
- Appropriations for military construction declined 28% from the prior fiscal year.

==== Division K – State and foreign operations ====
The act appropriated $55.5 billion for the U.S. Department of State, foreign operations, related programs, and the Overseas Contingency Operations (OCO) funds. This was an increase from the amount appropriated in the previous fiscal year, but lower than the bills approved by the House and Senate. The act also included funding for the U.S. contribution to the replenishment of the Global Fund to Fight Aids, Tuberculosis and Malaria, a goal of global health advocates. The foreign aid appropriations are an increase of about 1%.

- $16.68 billion for State Department operations
- $8 billion in Overseas Contingency Operations (OCO) funds
- $7.8 billion for humanitarian and disaster assistance
- $3.4 billion for the development assistance account
- $2.42 billion for democracy programs
  - $33 million for democracy promotion programs for Venezuela
- $2.1 billion for multilateral assistance
- $1.66 billion for USAID operating expenses and USAID Office of Inspector General
- $1.3 billion for the Foreign Military Financing program, including $1.3 billion for Egypt (with disbursement of those funds dependent on certain conditions)
- $1 billion for food security and agricultural development
- $906 million for the Millennium Challenge Corporation
- $875 million for education (including $100 million for Global Partnership for Education and $25 million for Education Cannot Wait)
- $500 million for missile defense systems for Israel
- $299 million for the U.S. International Development Finance Corporation

==== Division L – Transportation, housing and urban development ====
- $86.7 billion for the U.S. Department of Transportation (an increase of $553 million from FY 2020).
  - $49.1 billion for the Federal Highway Administration, 94% of which is allocated to states and local governments as part of the federal-aid highway program
  - $13 billion for the Federal Transit Administration
  - $2.8 billion for the Federal Railroad Administration, including the Consolidated Rail Infrastructure and Safety Improvements and Federal-State Partnership for State of Good Repair programs
  - $2 billion for Amtrak, of which $1.3 billion is for National Network Grants and $700 million is for Northeast Corridor Grants
  - $7.8 billion for the U.S. Army Corps of Engineers
- $60.3 billion in budget authority for the U.S. Department of Housing and Urban Development ($49.6 billion from discretionary appropriations, $10.7 billion from offsetting receipts), representing "an increase of $3.8 billion in programmatic funding" from FY 2020 and $12.3 billion more than Trump's budget request. Congress rejected Trump's proposal to eliminate all funding for the Public Housing Capital Fund, HOME, Community Development Block Grant, and Choice Neighborhoods programs.

=== Other provisions ===
Divisions O through Z and AA through FF contains additional legislation (called "authorizing matters") unrelated to coronavirus relief and annual appropriations. Additionally, the appropriations provisions of the bill contain various policy riders. The addition of such provisions to omnibus spending legislation ("loading up the Christmas tree") is common toward the end of a congressional session. Among these are:

- a directive to establish the Smithsonian American Women's History Museum and the National Museum of the American Latino within the Smithsonian Institution, with locations on or near the National Mall in Washington
- the re-authorization of intelligence programs
- copyright and trademark protections, including creation of a small-claims court in the United States Copyright Office via the CASE Act, and creating felony penalties for mass-streaming of copyrighted material via the Protecting Lawful Streaming Act
- Incorporation of the Aircraft Certification, Safety and Accountability Act, addressing aircraft safety issues in the wake of Boeing 737 MAX incidents
- Incorporation of the Leonel Rondon Pipeline Safety Act, named after a man killed in the 2018 Merrimack Valley gas explosions; the bill strengthens pipeline safety requirements
- Incorporation of the Preventing Online Sales of E-Cigarettes to Children Act, requiring in-person age verification when online purchases of e-cigarette and vaping products are delivered
- Incorporation of the Horseracing Integrity and Safety Act, establishing national safety standards for the horse racing industry, in a bid to combat horse doping—a subject of scandal in preceding years

==== Healthcare ====
- A ban on most surprise medical billing—unexpected, and sometimes large, bills from out-of-network providers that are charged to patients. The ban, which goes into effect in 2022, will require out-of-network providers to negotiate with insurers to obtain compensation, rather than billing insured patients directly. The ban on surprising billing will apply to physicians, hospitals, and air ambulances, but does not apply to ground ambulances. The ban on surprise billing had broad public support; a similar provision nearly passed in 2019, but was blocked amid concerns from health providers and the private-equity firms that own many of them.
- Reauthorizing funding for community health centers for three years
- Extension of Medicare and Medicaid reimbursement rates for health care providers and procedures
- Requiring ERISA health plan sponsors to attest that fees are fair and reasonable for the services provided

==== Tax provisions ====
- Various "tax extenders" extending expiring tax breaks; including making permanent a previous reduction in the excise tax for producers of beer, wine, and distilled spirits (a measure advocated for by the alcohol industry); extension of the wind production tax credit (advocated by the American Wind Energy Association); a tax extender for the motorsports entertainment industry (benefiting NASCAR and others); and a tax extender for buyers of "two-wheeled plug-in electric vehicles" (electric motorcycles and scooters)
- A tax deduction for corporate meal expenses; inclusion of this provision was pushed by Trump and administration officials, but was criticized by many House Democrats who referred to it as a needless "three-martini lunch" tax break, as well as by economists across the political spectrum. During negotiations, Democrats ultimately agreed to include the deduction in exchange for Republicans' agreement to the expansion of tax credits for the working poor and low-income families.

==== Education ====
- increasing the maximum Pell Grant amount by $150 (bringing it to $6,495)
- allowing incarcerated students to receive Pell Grants
- forgiving $1.3 billion in debt from federal loans made to 44 historically black colleges and universities
- simplifying the FAFSA form (reducing its size from 108 questions to 36 questions)
- appropriating $28 million to the Institute of Education Sciences

==== Foreign and human rights policy ====
- Incorporation of the Taiwan Assurance Act, directing the Department of State to review its guidance governing U.S.-Taiwan relations
- Incorporation of the Tibet Policy and Support Act, directing the establishment of a U.S. consulate in Tibet and reaffirming U.S. policy on the succession or reincarnation of the Dalai Lama, stating that "Interference by the Government of the People's Republic of China or any other government in the process of recognizing a successor or reincarnation of the 14th Dalai Lama and any future Dalai Lamas would represent a clear abuse of the right to religious freedom of Tibetan Buddhists and the Tibetan people."
- Incorporation of the Belarus Democracy, Human Rights, and Sovereignty Act, reauthorizing and expanding the Belarus Democracy Act of 2004, stating that it is U.S. policy to reject the allegedly fraudulent 2020 Belarusian presidential election; refusing to recognize Lukashenka as the legitimately elected leader of Belarus; and strengthening the current human rights sanctions regime on Belarus
- Establishment, within the Department of State, of an Office of Sanctions Coordination to coordinate sanctions policy both within the Department of State and externally with allies

==== Energy and environmental provisions ====
- A comprehensive update to clean energy research and development programs at the Department of Energy known as the Energy Act of 2020, authorizing over $35 billion in funding. The legislation is based on the American Energy Innovation Act proposed by Senate Energy and Natural Resources Committee Chair Lisa Murkowski
- $10 billion for water projects, such as coastal protection, flood control, and environmental projects of the U.S. Army Corps of Engineers. The legislation, which incorporated language from the Water Resources Development Act of 2020 (passed by the House earlier in the session) authorizes a record number of water projects
- A phase-out of hydrochlorofluorocarbons (HFCs), powerful greenhouse gases that contributes to climate change; the measure will decrease HFC usage by 85% over 15 years, to avert what would otherwise be an additional 0.5 °C of global warming. This aligns with the goals of the Kigali Amendment of the Montreal Protocol, which the United States had not ratified at the time of passage.
- Extending various energy efficiency tax incentives through 2021
- Making the 179D commercial building tax deduction for improvements to building energy efficiency
- Extending, through the end of 2021, the underground and surface-mine coal excise tax, which funds the Black Lung Disability Trust Fund
- Extending, through the end of 2025, the 9-cent-per-barrel excise tax on crude oil, which funds the Oil Spill Liability Trust Fund
- Reauthorize the Pipeline and Hazardous Materials Safety Administration (PHMSA), of the U.S. Department of Transportation, for five years. The PHMSA reauthorization was the result of a compromise, and did not include ambitious climate change mitigation and methane-control provisions initially proposed by House Democrats.
- Blocked the greater sage grouse from being listed under the Endangered Species Act
- Limiting oil and gas extraction in the area of Chaco Culture National Historical Park, New Mexico
- Small additions to the area of Saguaro National Park
- Redesignation of New River Gorge National River to New River Gorge National Park and Preserve

== Economic analyses ==
Economists projected that the relief act (in conjunction with the development and distribution of COVID-19 vaccines) would have a stimulative effect and would strengthen U.S. economic recovery in the second half of 2021, but came too late to avert a struggling economy in the first half of 2021. An analysis by economists Adam Hersh and Mark Paul, commissioned by the Groundwork Collaborative, a progressive think tank, concluded that Congress would need to enact a near-term stimulus about four times larger in order to obtain a full recovery.

The bill's omission of grants to state and local governments, which are struggling with budget shortfalls, was criticized by economists, who noted that the lack of revenue would lead to state and local governments eliminating jobs and raising taxes.

Economists stated that the $25 billion in rental assistance programs allocated by the bill were insufficient to prevent a looming eviction crisis.

== See also ==
- Economic impact of the COVID-19 pandemic in the United States
- List of COVID-19 pandemic legislation
- U.S. federal government response to the COVID-19 pandemic
