= Copyright bills in the 112th United States Congress =

There were different but similar copyright bills in the 112th United States Congress: The Stop Online Piracy Act (SOPA) in the House of Representatives and the PROTECT IP Act (PIPA) in the Senate. A typical route for legislation like this is to pass some version in both houses (so called companion bills), then refer the two bills to a conference committee, which would produce a single bill likely to pass both houses.

These bills were motivated by concerns of copyright holders that their copyright protection in being undermined by the illegal dissemination of copyrighted information via the Internet. Opponents of the proposed legislation say that the proposed remedies are far worse than the problem they are intended to solve.

== Economic impact of SOPA / PIPA ==
=== Negative impact on web hosting services ===
Journalist Rebecca MacKinnon argued that making companies liable for users' actions could have a chilling effect on user-generated sites like YouTube. "The intention is not the same as China’s Great Firewall, a nationwide system of Web censorship, but the practical effect could be similar". The Electronic Frontier Foundation (EFF) has warned that Etsy, Flickr and Vimeo all seem likely to shut down if the bill becomes law. According to critics, the bill would ban linking to sites deemed offending, even in search results and on services such as Twitter. Many cloud computing and Web hosting services may leave the US to avoid lawsuits.

The Motion Picture Association of America claimed the act's effect on business would be slight, noting that at least 16 countries block websites, and the internet still functions in those countries. Denmark, Finland and Italy blocked The Pirate Bay after courts ruled in favor of music and film industry litigation, and a coalition of film and record companies has threatened to sue British Telecom if it does not follow suit.

=== General threat to web-related businesses ===
A news analysis in the information technology magazine eWeek stated, "The language of SOPA is so broad, the rules so unconnected to the reality of Internet technology and the penalties so disconnected from the alleged crimes that this bill could effectively kill e-commerce or even normal Internet use. The bill also has grave implications for existing U.S., foreign and international laws and is sure to spend decades in court challenges." It was similarly claimed that, "any US consumer who uses a website overseas immediately gives the US jurisdiction the power to potentially take action against it."

On October 28, 2011, the EFF called the bill a "massive piece of job-killing Internet regulation," and said, "This bill cannot be fixed; it must be killed."

Gary Shapiro, CEO of the Consumer Electronics Association, stated that "The bill attempts a radical restructuring of the laws governing the Internet," and that "It would undo the legal safe harbors that have allowed a world-leading Internet industry to flourish over the last decade. It would expose legitimate American businesses and innovators to broad and open-ended liability. The result will be more lawsuits, decreased venture capital investment, and fewer new jobs." A similar claim was made by CrowdFlower.

Booz & Company on November 16 released a study, funded by Google, finding that almost all of the 200 venture capitalists and angel investors interviewed would stop funding digital media intermediaries if the House bill becomes law. More than 80 percent said they would rather invest in a risky, weak economy with the current laws than a strong economy with the proposed law in effect. If legal ambiguities were removed and good faith provisions in place, investing would increase by nearly 115 percent.

== Civil liberties issues with SOPA / PIPA ==
There were concerns that the bills were too vague and could be used for prior censorship. If WikiLeaks were accused of distributing copyrighted content, U.S. search engines could be served a court order to block search results pointing to WikiLeaks. Requiring search engines to remove links to an entire website altogether due to an infringing page would raise free speech concerns regarding lawful content hosted elsewhere on the site. proxy servers, such as those used during the Arab Spring, can also be used to thwart copyright enforcement and therefore may be made illegal by the act.

The bills could allegedly be used to block any web site with a page that was identified in the U.K. or France as containing hate speech or violations of celebrities' privacy. The Center for Democracy and Technology warned, "If SOPA and PIPA are enacted, the US government must be prepared for other governments to follow suit, in service to whatever social policies they believe are important—whether restricting hate speech, insults to public officials, or political dissent."

From the other side, the AFL-CIO's Paul Almeida stated that free speech was not a relevant consideration, because "The First Amendment does not protect stealing goods off trucks."

Floyd Abrams said “The Protect IP Act neither compels nor prohibits free speech or communication… the bill sets a high bar in defining when a website or domain is eligible for potential actions by the Attorney General…”.

Google chairman Eric Schmidt has stated that the measures called for in the PROTECT IP Act are overly simple solutions to a complex problem, and that the precedent set by pruning DNS entries is bad from the viewpoint of free speech and would be a step toward less permissive Internet environments, such as China's.

A group of Law professors said that the PROTECT IP and Stop Online Piracy bills could have the opposite of the intended impact, by driving users to unregulated, alternative DNS systems, and it could hinder the government from conducting legitimate Internet regulation. They question the constitutionality of both bills, believing they could have potentially disastrous technical consequences and would make US internet law more like the laws of repressive regimes. Both bills provide "nothing more than ex parte proceedings—proceedings at which only one side (the prosecutor or even a private plaintiff) need present evidence and the operator of the allegedly infringing site need not be present nor even made aware that the action was pending against his or her 'property.' This not only violates basic principles of due process by depriving persons of property without a fair hearing and a reasonable opportunity to be heard, it also constitutes an unconstitutional abridgement of the freedom of speech protected by the First Amendment."

== Technical issues regarding SOPA / PIPA ==
The DNS filtering provisions in the bill "raise serious technical and security concerns" and would "break the Internet", according to whitepaper by five Internet engineers. Other engineers and proponents of the act have called those concerns groundless and without merit.

One particular concern expressed by network experts was that hackers would offer workarounds to private users to allow access to government-seized sites, but these workarounds might also jeopardize security by redirecting unsuspecting users to scam websites. Supporters of the bill argued that widespread circumvention of the filtering would be unlikely. The DNS provisions were compared to car door locks, noting that while they aren't foolproof against thieves, we should still use them. A browser plugin called MAFIAAFire Redirector already exists that redirects visitors to an alternative domain when a site's primary domain has been seized. The Mozilla Foundation says that United States Department of Homeland Security (DHS) requested by phone that Mozilla remove the plugin, a request with which they have not yet complied. Instead, Mozilla's legal counsel has asked for further information from the DHS, including legal justification for the request.
