= Tibet Policy and Support Act =

American federal law passed in 2020

Tibetan Policy and Support Act
- Enacted by: the 116th United States Congress

Legislative history
- Introduced in the House as H.R. 4331 on September 13, 2019; Committee consideration by House Foreign Affairs; Passed the House on January 28, 2020 (392-22)

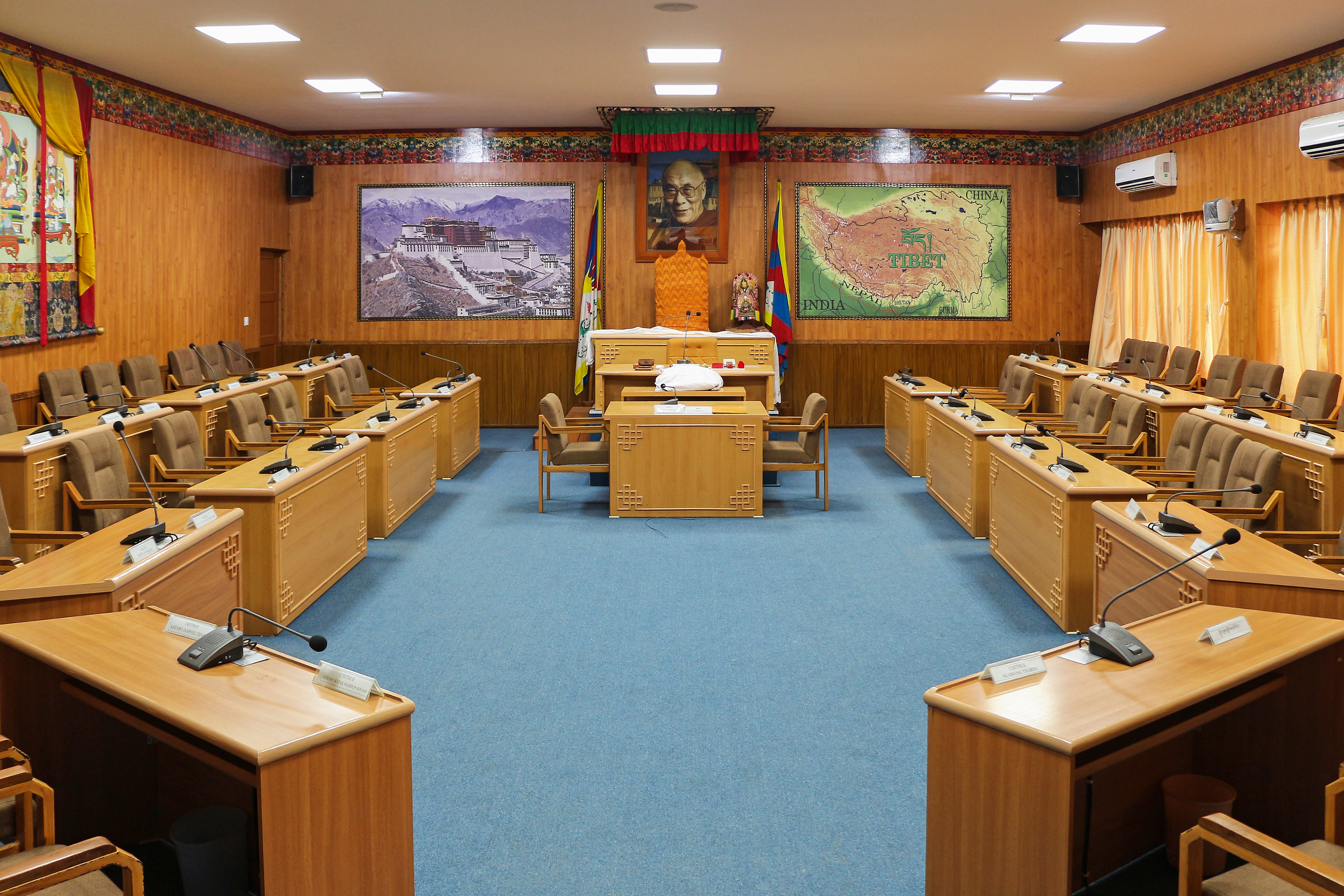
Parliament chamber of the Central Tibetan Administration or Tibetan Government-in-Exile in Dharamshala, India

The Tibetan Policy and Support Act is a federal law that outlines United States policy on Tibet.

== Legislative history ==
On January 28, 2020, the bill passed the US House of Representatives by a vote of 392–22.

On December 21, 2020, the bill was approved by the U.S. Congress as an amendment to the Consolidated Appropriations Act, 2021.

On December 27, 2020, the bill was signed into law.

== Legislation ==
The Tibetan Policy and Support Act would make it official United States policy that the succession of Tibetan Buddhist leaders, including the succession of the Dalai Lama, be left solely to Tibetan Buddhists to decide, without interference from the Chinese government. Chinese officials that interfere in the process of selecting Tibetan Buddhist leaders would be subject to sanctions under the Global Magnitsky Act, including denial of entry into the United States. The bill also calls for the creation of a new US consulate in Lhasa, the capital of the Tibet Autonomous Region.

== Reactions ==
=== Domestic ===
The United States Commission on International Religious Freedom (USCIRF) commended the US House of Representatives for passing the act, which the USCIRF had previously endorsed.

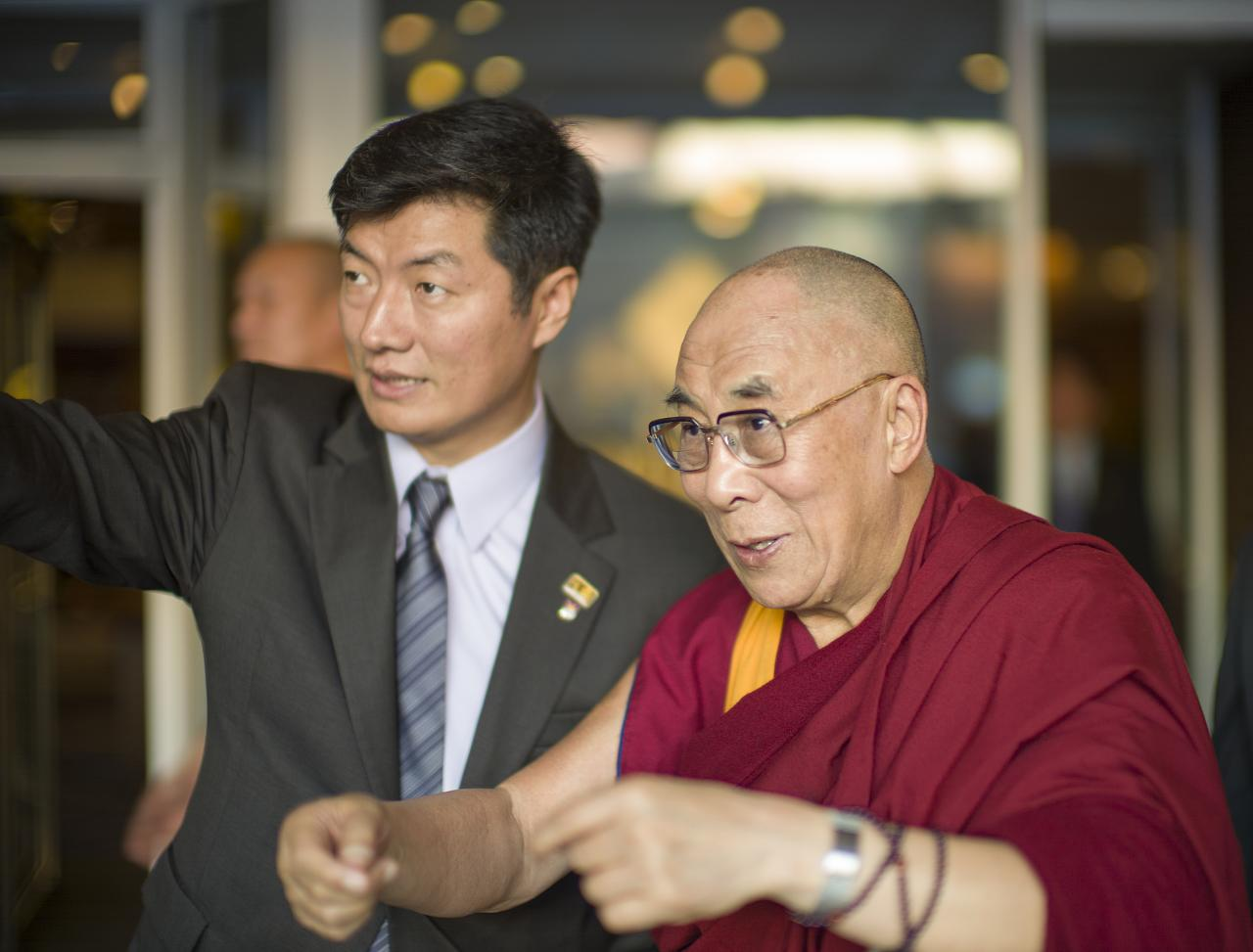
Tenzin Gyatso, the 14th Dalai Lama of Tibet with Prime Minister Lobsang Sangay of the Tibetan Government-in-Exile visit Boston in October 2012

Jim McGovern, Chair of the Tom Lantos Human Rights Commission and the Congressional-Executive Commission on China commented, "We are criticizing the Chinese Communist Party (CCP) and not the Chinese people, who are also suffering under China’s repression,... We stand in solidarity with the Tibetan people and revere His Holiness the Dalai Lama. We all are in this together and we expect the President to sign the Tibet Policy and Support Act into law soon."

=== Central Tibetan Administration ===
Lobsang Sangay, Sisur (Former President) of the Tibetan government-in-exile and graduate of the Harvard Law School, thanked the Government of the United States and the US House for passing The Tibetan Policy and Support Act.

=== China ===
Hua Chunying, China's Foreign Ministry spokesperson, said that the act severely violates the basic norms governing international relations and was the latest attempt to interfere in China's domestic affairs.

== See also ==
- Uyghur Human Rights Policy Act
