= ServInt =

American web hosting company (1995-2018)

The ServInt Corporation
- Type: Subsidiary
- Industry: Web hosting
- Founded: 1995
- Defunct: May 8, 2018
- Fate: Acquired
- Successor: Leaseweb
- Headquarters: Reston, United States
- Key people: Reed Caldwell (founder and CEO), Matthew Loschert (CTO)
- Website: www.servint.net

The ServInt Corporation was an American web hosting company based in Reston, Virginia. It sold managed virtual private servers and dedicated hosting services. Founded in 1995, the company was acquired by Leaseweb USA in 2018.

== History ==
ServInt was founded by Reed J. Caldwell in 1995. Caldwell initially ran it from a college dormitory with one employee, a $10,000 family loan, several student credit cards and a single Pentium-90 server running Linux 1.2.9. The company left the dormitory by the end of 1995 and was an early seller of managed dedicated servers. It operated its own network, which one 2005 account described as approaching Tier 1 status apart from domestic Sprint peering.

Before the dot-com crash of 2000, ServInt invested in a transnational content delivery network. Demand for the network fell after the crash, and the combination of its costs and the loss of customers led ServInt to file for Chapter 11 bankruptcy protection in February 2001. The company later left bankruptcy protection and refocused on managed web hosting. From 2002 it sold virtual private server, cloud hosting and dedicated server products from data centers in Virginia, California and Washington, D.C.

In December 2010, Netcraft reported that ServInt hosted WikiLeaks.

ServInt opposed the Stop Online Piracy Act. Its chief operating officer Christian Dawson argued publicly against the bill.

Leaseweb USA acquired ServInt on May 8, 2018.

== 2009 Rackspace outage ==
In July 2009, the competing host Rackspace had a series of outages. Caldwell published a post on the ServInt corporate blog defending Rackspace's handling of the outages and criticizing what he called disingenuous poaching by a rival host. The post did not name the rival, and Yan Ness, chief executive of OnlineTech, replied on his own company's blog. The writer Shel Israel described Caldwell's post as an example of "lethal generosity", and the trade publication Data Center Knowledge used the episode to discuss marketing to a competitor's customers during an outage.

== Services ==
ServInt's main products were managed virtual private servers and dedicated hosting. They were sold together with third-party software, including the Jelastic platform and WordPress.

== Locations ==
ServInt's offices were in Reston, Virginia. The company leased data center space from CoreSite in Northern Virginia and in Los Angeles. In June 2012 it opened a data center in Amsterdam, its first outside North America.
