= Commercial Felony Streaming Act =

United States Senate bill

The Commercial Felony Streaming Act (S. 978) was a bill that was introduced to the United States Senate on May 12, 2011.

== History ==
The bill was proposed by Amy Klobuchar, Chris Coons, and John Cornyn. It would have been an amendment to US Code Title 18 Section 2319, that would make unauthorized streaming of copyrighted material for the purpose of "commercial advantage or personal financial gain", a felony (under US copyright law at the time, unauthorized streaming was only a misdemeanor). The penalty could include up to five years of imprisonment. The bill defined illegal streaming as streaming ten or more times in a 180-day period. Furthermore, the value of the illegally streamed material would have to be greater than $2,500, or the licensing fees would have to be over $5,000.

Several articles were published, expressing concern as to whether the Act would have affected those who stream or post videos of copyrighted content (e.g. video games, TV shows, music) on public sites such as YouTube. The bill did not directly address this aspect. Although the Act would never become law, there was an outcry with several negative reactions against it on YouTube and other websites during the summer of 2011. Singer Justin Bieber was notably among the list of creators in opposition to the bill, and he stated that Klobuchar, the bill's sponsor, "needs to be locked up, put away in cuffs". Both Klobuchar and Coons stated that the Act was not intended to affect the aforementioned aspects, instead it would only target websites or people who profit from illegally streaming copyrighted material.

== Status ==
The bill was considered in committee and introduced to the full chamber during the 2011 congressional session. However, it never received a vote on the Senate floor, and its content was consolidated months later into the Stop Online Piracy Act which was ultimately never passed. Another bill with similar characteristics, the Protecting Lawful Streaming Act, which was specifically tailored to only target willful copyright infringement and which received no opposition from critics, was passed and signed into law by President Donald Trump in December 2020.

== See also ==
- PROTECT IP Act
- Stop Online Piracy Act
- Protecting Children from Internet Pornographers Act of 2011
- Protecting Lawful Streaming Act
