= Horseracing Integrity and Safety Authority =

Self-regulatory organization for Thoroughbred racing

Horseracing Integrity and Safety Authority (HISA)
- Founded: 2020; 6 years ago
- Headquarters: Lexington, Kentucky, U.S.
- CEO: Lisa Lazarus
- Chairperson: Charles Scheeler
- Budget: US$66 million (2023)
- Website: hisaus.org

The Horseracing Integrity and Safety Authority (HISA) is a private self-regulatory organization that regulates the sport of Thoroughbred horse racing in the United States. It is empowered by the federal Horseracing Integrity and Safety Act of 2020 to propose and enforce regulations related to safety and anti-doping aspects of the sport.

== History ==
The Horseracing Integrity and Safety Act was enacted into law in 2020 as Title XII of the US's Consolidated Appropriations Act, 2021. The authority's initial board of directors took office in May 2021.

The Act was subject to legal cases challenging its constitutionality. In November 2022, the Fifth Circuit Court of Appeals found the law to be unconstitutional, because it violated the private non-delegation doctrine by giving governmental authority to a private entity. In response, Congress amended the law to give the Federal Trade Commission more control over the Authority's rules. The Sixth Circuit Court of Appeals found the amended law to be constitutional in March 2023.

HISA's first racetrack safety regulations went into effect on July 1, 2022. Its anti-doping rules and enforcement program began on May 22, 2023.

== Regulatory functions ==
HISA has jurisdiction over races that are involved in interstate commerce, including those that are subject to off-track betting and advance-deposit wagering, and the horses and horsemen who participate in those races. The Authority propounds rules subject to modification and approval by the Federal Trade Commission.

=== Racetrack safety ===
HISA is charged with developing and enforcing rules for racetrack safety. It regulates matters such as track surface maintenance, veterinary oversight, injury data reporting, jockey safety, horseshoe requirements, and use of riding crops. A violation of the rules, such as a jockey striking a horse with a crop more than six times during a race, may be punished with a fine and suspension from racing.

=== Anti-doping and medication control ===
HISA is responsible for developing anti-doping and medication rules to ensure fairness and protect equine health. Administration of the rules, including collecting and testing of blood, urine, and hair samples, is delegated to the Horseracing Integrity & Welfare Unit, a subsidiary of Drug Free Sport International, a private drug-testing company.

== Opposition ==
Some states have not recognized the HISA, instead continuing to operate under safety and medication regulations on a state level. The Texas Racing Commission has refused to recognize the HISA on the grounds that it conflicts with its own state rules. In addition to Texas, racing jurisdictions in Louisiana and West Virginia continue to operate under state rules as of the implementation of the HISA while awaiting the resolution of legal challenges. The National Horsemen's Benevolent and Protective Association (HBPA) has also opposed the HISA.

In September 2023 Republican congressman Clay Higgins of Louisiana introduced a bill that would have replaced the HISA with a new agency. The legislation, H.R. 5693, was supported by the National HBPA as well as the United States Trotting Association, which governs harness racing in the United States.
