= Copyright Alternative in Small-Claims Enforcement Act of 2020 =

United States law on copyright remedies

CASE Act of 2020
- Long title: Copyright Alternative in Small-Claims Enforcement Act of 2020

Citations
- Public law: Pub. L. No. 116–260, Div. Q, Title II, § 212
- Statutes at Large: 134 Stat. 2176

Codification
- Titles affected: 17
- U.S.C. sections created: 17 U.S.C. §§ 1501–1511

Legislative history
- Introduced in the House as H.R. 2426 by Hakeem Jeffries (D–NY) on May 1, 2019; Committee consideration by United States House Committee on the Judiciary; Passed the House on October 22, 2019 (410-6); Passed the House as the Consolidated Appropriations Act, 2021, H.R. 133 on December 21, 2020 (359-53) with amendment; Senate agreed to House amendment on December 21, 2020 (92-6); Signed into law by President Donald Trump on December 27, 2020

The Copyright Alternative in Small-Claims Enforcement (CASE) Act of 2020 is a United States law that establishes a small claims court–type system within the United States Copyright Office, known as the Copyright Claims Board (CCB), for copyright owners to seek damages under US$30,000 for copyright violations.

The measure was introduced in the United States House of Representatives on May 1, 2019, and was passed on October 22, 2019. An identical version was introduced in the United States Senate on May 1, 2019.

The CASE Act, along with two other IP-related bills, were included as part of a omnibus spending and COVID-19 relief bill in December 2020, which was passed by Congress on December 21, 2020. President Donald Trump signed the bill into law on December 27, 2020. Following the rule-making process within the copyright office, the board began hearing these claims in June 2022.

== Background ==
Under federal law, copyright infringement cases must be pursued in federal courts. This can be an expensive and time-consuming option for small copyright owners, particularly for rightsholders of written and visual works. Infringements became more significant with the popularity of the Internet which made sharing material, including those that violated copyrighted, much easier.

While considering the matter of copyright protections for orphan works, the United States Congress recognized these challenges for smaller copyright owners in taking action to protect their own works. In March 2006, the House Committee on the Judiciary Subcommittee on Courts, the Internet, and Intellectual Property held a hearing titled "Remedies for Small Claims Copyright", which concluded by instructing the United States Copyright Office to study potential solutions to the matter. The copyright office published a report in September 2013 on alternatives to federal litigation for copyright infringements claims. The copyright office proposed the idea of a small claims tribunal system that could be run by the Office for copyright owners seeking damages up to US$30,000.

== Legislative history ==
Representative Hakeem Jeffries (D-New York) introduced the CASE Act in 2016 and 2017. The House Committee on the Judiciary held a legislative hearing on the 2017 version of bill on September 27, 2018.

Judy Chu (D-California) and Lamar Smith (R-Texas) introduced similar legislation on December 8, 2016, titled the Fairness for American Small Creators Act.

The CASE Act of 2019 was introduced on May 1, 2019, in the House of Representatives (H.R. 2426) by Representatives Hakeem Jeffries (D-NY) and Doug Collins (R-GA); and for the first time in the Senate (S. 1273) by Senators John Kennedy (R-Louisiana), Thom Tillis (R-North Carolina), Dick Durbin (D-Illinois), and Mazie Hirono (D-Hawaii). Original House co-sponsors include: House Committee on the Judiciary Chairman Jerry Nadler (D-NY) and House Committee on the Judiciary Intellectual Property Subcommittee Chairman Hank Johnson (D-Georgia), as well as Martha Roby (R-Alabama), Judy Chu (D-California), Ben Cline (R-Virginia), Ted Lieu (D-California), and Brian Fitzpatrick (R-Pennsylvania).

On October 22, 2019, the House passed H.R. 2426 by a vote of 410-6. Fifteen Members of Congress did not vote. The six "no" votes were: Justin Amash (I-Michigan), Warren Davidson (R-Ohio), Greg Gianforte (R-Montana), Trent Kelly (R-Mississippi), Thomas Massie (R-Kentucky), and Ralph Norman (R-South Carolina).

On September 12, 2019, the Senate Committee on the Judiciary approved the measure without amendment.

The CASE Act, along with the Trademark Modernization Act and the Protecting Lawful Streaming Act introduced by Senator Thom Tillis that would make commercial streaming of certain types of copyrighted content qualify as a felony crime, were passed as part of the Consolidated Appropriations Act, 2021 on December 21, 2020. Trump signed the bill into law on December 27, 2020.

The Copyright Office issued its final ruling on how the CASE Act would be implemented under the law were issued in March 2022, with Copyright Claims Board available to hear cases starting June 16, 2022.

== Provisions ==
Following the framework proposed by the Copyright Office, the CASE Act establishes a Copyright Claims Board within the Copyright Office. The Claims Board can decide copyright infringement claims filed by any copyright holder, declarations of non-infringement brought by users, and misrepresentation claims (under the Digital Millennium Copyright Act). This Board is made up of three attorneys, two of which must be knowledgeable in copyright law. For works timely registered with the Copyright Office, the maximum statutory damages are US$15,000 per work and US$30,000 per claim, while unregistered copyrighted works are eligible for half those amounts. Attorney fees and costs are generally unavailable in CCB proceedings. However, cases of bad faith attorney fees and costs may be available up to $5,000 if the conduct is egregious. The Claims Board may not issue injunctions but can order a party to cease infringement if the parties agree.

The process is voluntary; once a claim is filed, respondents have a sixty day period to opt-out. If the respondent does not opt out, the Claims Board will make a final determination and assessment of damages, if any. This method is not available to seek damages against infringement from federal or state governments or from foreign entities, nor for claims established in pending cases. The CASE Act also contains a provision allowing libraries and archives to preemptively opt out of all Copyright Claims Board proceedings before anyone files a claim against them.

The CASE Act provides some mechanisms for review of CCB decisions. If a party believes a CCB has erred in its ruling, the party can request reconsideration of a CCB decision. The CCB then reviews the decision for clear error. If the request for review is denied, the party can seek review of the CCB’s decision with the Register of Copyrights for abuse of discretion. If the Register of Copyrights finds no abuse of discretion, there are then some limited circumstances in which the party may then seek relief from the federal district court in the jurisdiction where the copyright infringement occurred. The party must demonstrate that the CCB decision resulted from fraud, corruption, or other misconduct, that the CCB exceeded its authority, the CCB failed to reach a final judgment, or a default or failure to prosecute judgment was entered, resulting from excusable neglect by the party.

== Support ==
On June 26, 2019, in a statement to the House of Representatives Committee on the Judiciary, U.S. Register of Copyrights Karyn A. Temple expressed the U.S. Copyright Office’s support for a small claims tribunal system. In her statement, she noted that “...low-dollar but still valuable copyrighted works are frequently infringed with impunity, and individual creators and small businesses often lacking [sic] an effective remedy... For this reason, the Copyright Office strongly supports a small claims tribunal structured along the lines of the proposal detailed in the Copyright Office’s 2013 report."

The bipartisan legislation is also supported by groups such as the Copyright Alliance, Professional Photographers of America, American Society of Media Photographers, International Authors Forum, the Authors Guild the Graphic Artists Guild, the NAACP, AFL-CIO, the American Conservative Union, and the American Bar Association, as well as the U.S. Chamber of Commerce, and thousands of independent creators and small businesses across the United States. Proponents of the bill support the Copyright Office’s findings that the small claims tribunal will provide a more financially accessible alternative to federal court, and will enable creators to protect their copyrighted material more effectively. Additionally, the Claims Board would be able to determine whether use of a copyrighted work constitutes fair use.

In response to criticism concerns, a statement to the Senate Judiciary Committee Subcommittee on Intellectual Property on July 30, 2019, Register Temple said, “I am pleased to note that the legislation that was recently passed out of the full Senate Judiciary Committee contains several provisions to help address these concerns... These provisions, combined with the extensive notice requirements and due process safeguards for respondents, would provide important safeguards against the use of the CCB by bad faith claimants.”

== Criticism ==
Public interest groups such as the Electronic Frontier Foundation (EFF), Public Knowledge, and the Authors Alliance have opposed the bill, claiming that the CASE Act is still not enough to appropriately protect individuals from "sophisticated actors" (corporations, copyright "trolls" and similar abusers). These critics argue that a copyright office tribunal established outside of the judicial system will be unconstitutional, an opt-out system from this tribunal will open up unknowing parties to be blindsided with little recourse, and the tribunal's statutory limits allow for outrageously steep penalties. Other law experts stated that the larger copyright owners may target fair use and de minimis usages and coerce those using legal usage of copyrighted works to either stop using them or seek legal support for the tribunal. Library Futures, which speaks on behalf of libraries, has critiqued that, though libraries and archives are protected, library workers are not.

There was also criticism from those that supported small copyright creators, stating that the opt-out provision gives infringers too much power to reject the use of the Claims Court and force creators to use the federal courts to seek penalties.
