= Stop Online Piracy Act =

Failed United States bill in 2011

- Long title: "To promote prosperity, creativity, entrepreneurship, and innovation by combating the theft of U.S. property, and for other purposes." —H.R. 3261
- Acronyms (colloquial): SOPA
- Nicknames: House Bill 3261

Legislative history
- Introduced in the House as H.R. 3261 by Lamar Smith (R–TX) on October 26, 2011; Committee consideration by House Judiciary Committee

The Stop Online Piracy Act (SOPA) was a proposed United States congressional bill to expand the ability of U.S. law enforcement to combat online copyright infringement and online trafficking in counterfeit goods. Introduced on October 26, 2011, by Representative Lamar Smith (R–TX), provisions included the requesting of court orders to bar advertising networks and payment facilities from conducting business with infringing websites, and search engines from linking to the websites, and court orders requiring Internet service providers to block access to the websites. The proposed law would have expanded existing criminal laws to include unauthorized streaming of copyrighted content, imposing a maximum penalty of five years in prison.

Proponents of the legislation said it would protect the intellectual-property market and corresponding industry, jobs, and revenue, and was necessary to bolster enforcement of copyright laws, especially against foreign-owned and operated websites. Proponents claimed that flaws in existing laws did not cover foreign-owned and operated websites, and cited examples of active promotion of rogue websites by U.S. search engines. The bill appeared to have strong, bipartisan support. It was introduced in the House and was sent to the House Judiciary Committee for consideration. It also received support from the Fraternal Order of Police, the National Governors Association, the National Conference of State Legislatures, the U.S. Conference of Mayors, the National Association of Attorneys General, the United States Chamber of Commerce, the Better Business Bureau, the AFL-CIO and 22 trade unions, and the National Consumers League.

Opponents argued that the proposed legislation threatened free speech and innovation, and enabled law enforcement to block access to entire Internet domains due to infringing content posted on a single blog or webpage. They also stated that SOPA would bypass the "safe harbor" protections from liability presently afforded to websites by the Digital Millennium Copyright Act. The American Library Association and others also claimed that the legislation's emphasis on stronger copyright enforcement would expose libraries to prosecution. Other opponents claimed that requiring search engines to delete domain names violated the First Amendment and could begin a worldwide arms race of unprecedented Internet censorship. Human rights organizations, including Reporters Without Borders, the Electronic Frontier Foundation, the American Civil Liberties Union, and Human Rights Watch also opposed the bill.

The move to protest against SOPA and PIPA was initiated when Fight for the Future organized thousands of the most popular websites in the world, including Reddit, Craigslist, and the English Wikipedia, to consider temporarily closing their content and redirecting users to a message opposing the proposed legislation. On January 18, 2012, the English Wikipedia, Google, and an estimated 7,000 other smaller websites ceased standard operation as part of a coordinated service blackout as an attempt to spread awareness and objection to the bill. A banner the next day said more than 162 million people viewed its banner. In many cases, websites replaced the entirety of their main content with facts regarding SOPA and the entity's case against its passing. Boycotts of companies and organizations that support the legislation were organized, along with an opposition rally held in New York City. Google announced that it had collected over 4.5 million signatures opposing the bill in their January petition. Access to websites of several pro-SOPA organizations and companies such as the RIAA, CBS, and others was impeded or blocked with denial-of-service attacks which started on January 19, 2012. Self-proclaimed members of the "hacktivist" group Anonymous claimed responsibility and stated the attacks were a protest of both SOPA and the United States Department of Justice's shutdown of Megaupload on that same day.

Some opponents of the bill supported the Online Protection and Enforcement of Digital Trade Act (OPEN) as an alternative. On January 20, 2012, Smith, who chaired the Judiciary Committee, postponed plans to draft the bill: "The committee remains committed to finding a solution to the problem of online piracy that protects American intellectual property and innovation ... The House Judiciary Committee will postpone consideration of the legislation until there is wider agreement on a solution." The bill was effectively dead at that point.

== History ==
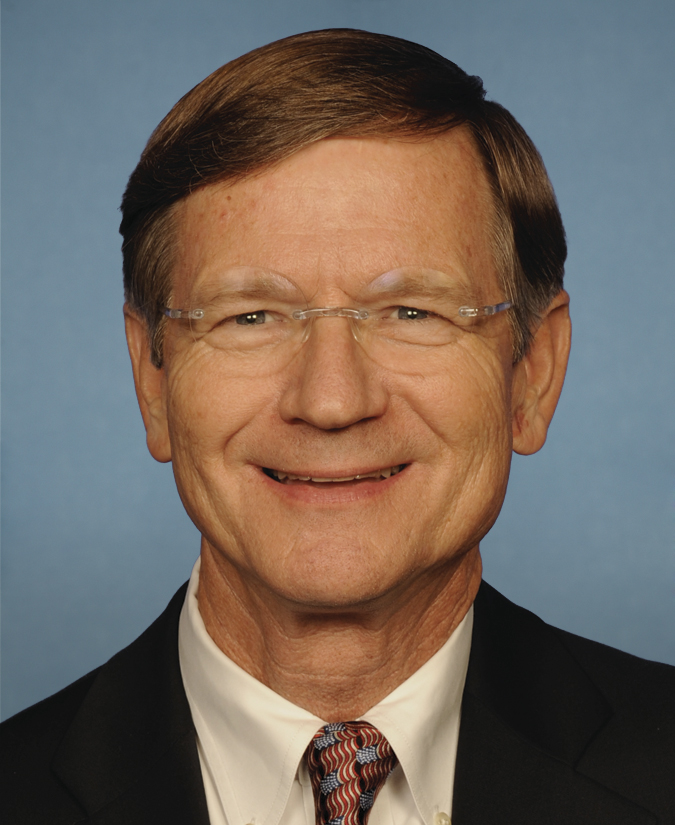
Rep. Lamar Smith (R-TX) introduced the SOPA bill.

Bill 3261 or H.R. 3261, was a proposed law that was introduced in the United States House of Representatives on October 26, 2011, by House Judiciary Committee Chair Representative Lamar S. Smith (R–TX) and a bipartisan group of 12 initial co-sponsors. Presented to the House Judiciary Committee, it builds on the similar PRO-IP Act of 2008 and the corresponding Senate bill, the PROTECT IP Act (PIPA).

The originally proposed bill would allow the United States Department of Justice, as well as copyright holders, to seek court orders against websites outside U.S. jurisdiction accused of enabling or facilitating copyright infringement. A court order requested by the DOJ could include barring online advertising networks and payment facilitators from conducting business with websites found to infringe on federal criminal intellectual-property laws, barring search engines from linking to such sites, and requiring Internet service providers to block access to such sites.

The bill establishes a two-step process for intellectual property-rights holders to seek relief if they have been harmed by a site dedicated to infringement. The rights holder must first notify, in writing, related payment facilitators and ad networks of the identity of the website, who, in turn, must then forward that notification and suspend services to that identified website, unless that site provides a counter notification explaining how it is not in violation. The rights holder can then sue for limited injunctive relief against the site operator, if such a counter notification is provided, or if the payment or advertising services fail to suspend service in the absence of a counter notification.

The second section covers penalties for streaming video and for selling counterfeit drugs, military materials, or consumer goods. The bill would increase penalties and expand copyright offenses to include unauthorized streaming of copyrighted content and other intellectual property offenses. The bill would criminalize unauthorized streaming of copyrighted content if they knowingly misrepresent the activity of the site, with a maximum penalty of five years in prison for ten such infringements within six months. The copyrighted content can be removed, and infringements can lead to the site being shut down. In July 2013, the Department of Commerce's Internet Policy Task Force issued a report endorsing "[a]dopting the same range of penalties for criminal streaming of copyrighted works to the public as now exists for criminal reproduction and distribution."

The bill provides immunity from liability to the ad and payment networks that comply with this Act or that take voluntary action to sever ties to such sites. Any copyright holder who knowingly misrepresents that a website is involved in copyright infringement would be liable for damages.

Supporters include the Motion Picture Association of America, pharmaceuticals makers, media businesses, and the United States Chamber of Commerce. They state it protects the intellectual-property market and corresponding industry, jobs and revenue, and is necessary to bolster enforcement of copyright laws, especially against foreign websites. They cite examples such as Google's $500 million settlement with the Department of Justice for its role in a scheme to target U.S. consumers with ads to illegally import prescription drugs from Canadian pharmacies.

Opponents stated that it violated the First Amendment, is Internet censorship, would cripple the Internet, and would threaten whistle-blowing and other free speech actions.

In October 2011, co-sponsor Representative Bob Goodlatte (R-VA), chairman of the House Judiciary Committee's Intellectual Property sub-panel, told The Hill that SOPA is a rewrite of the Senate's bill that addresses some tech-industry concerns, noting that under the House version of the legislation copyright holders won't be able to directly sue intermediaries such as search engines to block infringing websites and would instead need a court's approval before taking action against third parties.

On December 12, 2011, a revised version of the bill was tabled. Titled the "Manager's Amendment", it contained a number of changes in response to criticism of the original. As part of the revisions, the definition of sites that might be subject to enforcement was narrowed: the amendment limited such actions to sites that are designed or operated with the intent to promote copyright infringement, and it now only applies to non-US sites.

== Goals ==
=== Protecting intellectual property of content creators ===
According to Rep. Goodlatte, "Intellectual property is one of America's chief job creators and competitive advantages in the global marketplace, yet American inventors, authors, and entrepreneurs have been forced to stand by and watch as their works are stolen by foreign infringers beyond the reach of current U.S. laws. This legislation will update the laws to ensure that the economic incentives our Framers enshrined in the Constitution over 220 years ago—to encourage new writings, research, products, and services—remain effective in the 21st century's global marketplace, which will create more American jobs."

Rights holders see intermediaries—the companies who host, link to, and provide e-commerce around the content—as the only accessible defendants.

Sponsor Rep. John Conyers (D-MI) said, "Millions of American jobs hang in the balance, and our efforts to protect America's intellectual property are critical to our economy's long-term success." Smith added, "The Stop Online Piracy Act helps stop the flow of revenue to rogue websites and ensures that the profits from American innovations go to American innovators."

The Motion Picture Association of America (MPAA) representative who testified before the committee said that the motion picture and film industry supported two million jobs and 95,000 small businesses.

=== Protection against counterfeit drugs ===
Pfizer spokesman John Clark testified that patients could not always detect cleverly forged websites selling drugs that were either misbranded or simply counterfeit.

RxRights, a consumer-advocacy group, issued a statement saying that Clark failed "to acknowledge that there are Canadian and other international pharmacies that do disclose where they are located, require a valid doctor's prescription and sell safe, brand-name medications produced by the same leading manufacturers as prescription medications sold in the U.S." They had earlier said that SOPA "fails to distinguish between counterfeit and genuine pharmacies" and would prevent American patients from ordering their medications from Canadian pharmacies online.

Bill sponsor Smith accused Google of obstructing the bill, citing its $500 million settlement with the DOJ on charges that it allowed ads from Canadian pharmacies, leading to illegal imports of prescription drugs. Shipment of prescription drugs from foreign pharmacies to customers in the US typically violates the Federal Food, Drug and Cosmetic Act and the Controlled Substances Act.

== Impact on online freedom of speech ==
Mentioned on the Texas Insider, President Obama "will not support legislation that reduces freedom of expression", said interviewer Jay Carney.

On TIME's Techland blog, Jerry Brito wrote, "Imagine if the U.K. created a blacklist of American newspapers that its courts found violated celebrities' privacy? Or what if France blocked American sites it believed contained hate speech?" Similarly, the Center for Democracy and Technology warned, "If SOPA and PIPA are enacted, the US government must be prepared for other governments to follow suit, in service to whatever social policies they believe are important—whether restricting hate speech, insults to public officials, or political dissent."

Laurence H. Tribe, a Harvard University professor of constitutional law, released an open letter on the web stating that SOPA would "undermine the openness and free exchange of information at the heart of the Internet. And it would violate the First Amendment".

The AFL–CIO's Paul Almeida, arguing in favor of SOPA, has stated that free speech was not a relevant consideration, because "Freedom of speech is not the same as lawlessness on the Internet. There is no inconsistency between protecting an open Internet and safeguarding intellectual property. Protecting intellectual property is not the same as censorship; the First Amendment does not protect stealing goods off trucks."

=== Autocratic countries ===
According to the Electronic Frontier Foundation, proxy servers, such as those used during the Arab Spring, can also be used to thwart copyright enforcement and therefore may be regulated by the act.

John Palfrey, co-director of the Berkman Center for Internet & Society, expressed disagreement with the use of his research findings to support SOPA. He wrote that "SOPA would make many DNS circumvention tools illegal," which could put "dissident communities" in autocratic countries "at much greater risk than they already are." He added, "The single biggest funder of circumvention tools has been and remains the U.S. government, precisely because of the role the tools play in online activism. It would be highly counter-productive for the U.S. government to both fund and outlaw the same set of tools."

Marvin Ammori has stated the bill might make The Tor Project illegal. Initially sponsored by the U.S. Naval Research Laboratory, the Tor Project creates encryption technology used by dissidents in repressive regimes (that consequently outlaw it). Ammori says that the U.S. Supreme Court case of Lamont v. Postmaster General 381 U.S. 301 (1965) makes it clear that Americans have the First Amendment right to read and listen to such foreign dissident free speech, even if those foreigners themselves lack an equivalent free speech right (for example, under their constitution or through Optional Protocols under the United Nations International Covenant on Civil and Political Rights).

== Impact on websites ==
=== Websites that host user content ===
Opponents warned that SOPA could have a negative impact on online communities. Journalist Rebecca MacKinnon argued in an op-ed that making companies liable for users' actions could have a chilling effect on user-generated sites such as YouTube. "The intention is not the same as China's Great Firewall, a nationwide system of Web censorship, but the practical effect could be similar," Mackinnon stated. The Electronic Frontier Foundation (EFF) warned that websites Etsy, Flickr and Vimeo all seemed likely to shut down if the bill became law. Policy analysts for New America Foundation said this legislation would enable law enforcement to take down an entire domain due to something posted on a single blog, arguing, "an entire largely innocent online community could be punished for the actions of a tiny minority".

Additional concerns included the possible impact on common Internet functions such as links from one site to another or accessing data from the cloud. EFF claimed the bill would ban linking to sites deemed offending, even in search results and on services such as Twitter. Christian Dawson, Chief Operating Officer (COO) of Virginia-based hosting company ServInt, predicted that the legislation would lead to many cloud computing and Web hosting services moving out of the US to avoid lawsuits. Even without SOPA, the U.S. Immigration and Customs Enforcement agency (ICE) had already launched extradition proceedings against Richard O'Dwyer in the UK. O'Dwyer hosted the TVShack.net website which had links to material elsewhere and did not host any files. ICE stated that it intends to pursue websites even if their only connection to the USA is a .com or .net web domain.

The Electronic Frontier Foundation stated that the requirement that any site must self-police user generated content would impose significant liability costs and explains "why venture capitalists have said en masse they won't invest in online startups if PIPA and SOPA pass".

Proponents of the bill argued that filtering is already common. Michael O'Leary of the MPAA testified on November 16 that the act's effect on business would be more minimal, noting that at least 16 countries already block websites and that the Internet still functions in those countries. MPAA Chairman Chris Dodd noted that Google figured out how to block sites when China requested it. Some ISPs in Denmark, Finland, Ireland and Italy blocked The Pirate Bay after courts ruled in favor of music and film industry litigation, and a coalition of film and record companies has threatened to sue British Telecom if it does not follow suit. Maria Pallante of the United States Copyright Office said that Congress had updated the Copyright Act before and should again, or "the U.S. copyright system will ultimately fail." Asked for clarification, she said that the US currently lacks jurisdiction over websites in other countries.

=== Weakening of "safe harbor" protections ===
The 1998 Digital Millennium Copyright Act (DMCA) includes the Online Copyright Infringement Liability Limitation Act, that provides a "safe harbor" for websites that host content. Under that provision, copyright owners who felt that a site was hosting infringing content are required to request the site to remove the infringing material within a certain amount of time. SOPA would have bypassed this "safe harbor" provision by placing the responsibility for detecting and policing infringement onto the site itself, and allowing judges to block access to websites "dedicated to theft of U.S. property".

According to critics of the bill such as the Center for Democracy and Technology and the Electronic Frontier Foundation, the bill's wording was vague enough that a single complaint about a site could be enough to block it, with the burden of proof resting on the site. A provision in the bill states that any site would be blocked that "is taking, or has taken deliberate actions to avoid confirming a high probability of the use of the U.S.-directed site to carry out acts that constitute a violation." Critics have read this to mean that a site must actively monitor its content and identify violations to avoid blocking, rather than relying on others to notify it of such violations.

Law professor Jason Mazzone wrote, "Damages are also not available to the site owner unless a claimant 'knowingly materially' misrepresented that the law covers the targeted site, a difficult legal test to meet. The owner of the site can issue a counter-notice to restore payment processing and advertising, but services need not comply with the counter-notice."

Goodlatte stated, "We're open to working with them on language to narrow [the bill's provisions], but I think it is unrealistic to think we're going to continue to rely on the DMCA notice-and-takedown provision. Anybody who is involved in providing services on the Internet would be expected to do some things. But we are very open to tweaking the language to ensure we don't impose extraordinary burdens on legitimate companies as long as they aren't the primary purveyors [of pirated content]."

O'Leary submitted written testimony in favor of the bill that expressed guarded support of current DMCA provisions. "Where these sites are legitimate and make good faith efforts to respond to our requests, this model works with varying degrees of effectiveness," O'Leary wrote. "It does not, however, always work quickly, and it is not perfect, but it works."

=== Web-related businesses ===
An analysis in the information technology magazine eWeek stated, "The language of SOPA is so broad, the rules so unconnected to the reality of Internet technology and the penalties so disconnected from the alleged crimes that this bill could effectively kill e-commerce or even normal Internet use. The bill also has grave implications for existing U.S., foreign and international laws and is sure to spend decades in court challenges."

Art Bordsky of advocacy group Public Knowledge similarly stated, "The definitions written in the bill are so broad that any US consumer who uses a website overseas immediately gives the US jurisdiction the power to take action against it potentially."

On October 28, 2011, the EFF called the bill a "massive piece of job-killing Internet regulation," and said, "This bill cannot be fixed; it must be killed."

Gary Shapiro, CEO of the Consumer Electronics Association, spoke out strongly against the bill, stating, "The bill attempts a radical restructuring of the laws governing the Internet", and that "It would undo the legal, safe harbors that have allowed a world-leading Internet industry to flourish over the last decade. It would expose legitimate American businesses and innovators to broad and open-ended liability. The result will be more lawsuits, decreased venture capital investment, and fewer new jobs."

Lukas Biewald, founder of CrowdFlower, stated, "It'll have a stifling effect on venture capital... No one would invest because of the legal liability."

Booz & Company on November 16 published a Google-funded study finding that almost all of the 200 venture capitalists and angel investors interviewed would stop funding digital media intermediaries if the bill became law. More than 80 percent said they would rather invest in a risky, weak economy with the current laws than a strong economy with the proposed law in effect. If legal ambiguities were removed and good faith provisions in place, investing would increase by nearly 115 percent.

As reported by David Carr of The New York Times in an article critical of SOPA and PIPA, Google, Facebook, Twitter, and other companies sent a joint letter to Congress, stating "We support the bills' stated goals – providing additional enforcement tools to combat foreign 'rogue' Web sites that are dedicated to copyright infringement or counterfeiting. However, the bills as drafted would expose law-abiding U.S. Internet and technology companies to new uncertain liabilities, private rights of action and technology mandates that would require monitoring of Web sites. We are concerned that these measures pose a serious risk to our industry's continued track record of innovation and job creation, as well as to our nation's cybersecurity." Smith responded, saying, the article "unfairly criticizes the Stop Online Piracy Act", and, "does not point to any language in the bill to back up the claims. SOPA targets only foreign Web sites that are primarily dedicated to illegal and infringing activity. Domestic Web sites, like blogs, are not covered by this legislation." Smith also said that Carr incorrectly framed the debate as between the entertainment industry and high-tech companies, noting support by more than "120 groups and associations across diverse industries, including the United States Chamber of Commerce".

=== Users uploading illegal content ===
Lateef Mtima, director of the Institute for Intellectual Property and Social Justice at Howard University School of Law, expressed concern that users who upload copyrighted content to sites could potentially be held criminally liable themselves, saying, "Perhaps the most dangerous aspect of the bill is that the conduct it would criminalize is so poorly defined. While on its face the bill seems to attempt to distinguish between commercial and non-commercial conduct, purportedly criminalizing the former and permitting the latter, in actuality the bill not only fails to accomplish this but, because of its lack of concrete definitions, it potentially criminalizes conduct that is currently permitted under the law."

An aide to Rep. Smith said, "This bill does not make it a felony for a person to post a video on YouTube of their children singing to a copyrighted song. The bill specifically targets websites dedicated to illegal or infringing activity. Sites that host user content—like YouTube, Facebook, and Twitter—have nothing to be concerned about under this legislation."

=== Internal networks ===
A paper by the Center for Democracy and Technology claimed that the bill "targets an entire website even if only a small portion hosts or links to some infringing content."

According to A. M. Reilly of Industry Leaders Magazine, under SOPA, culpability for distributing copyright material is extended to those who aid the initial poster of the material. For companies that use virtual private networks (VPN) to create a network that appears to be internal but is spread across various offices and employees' homes, any of these offsite locations that initiate sharing of copyright material could put the entire VPN and hosting company at risk of violation.

Answering similar criticism in a CNET editorial, Recording Industry Association of America (RIAA) head, Cary Sherman wrote, "Actually, it's quite the opposite. By focusing on specific sites rather than entire domains, action can be targeted against only the illegal subdomain or Internet protocol address rather than taking action against the entire domain."

== Impact on web-browsing software ==
The Electronic Frontier Foundation expressed concern that free and open source software (FOSS) projects found to be aiding online piracy could experience serious problems under SOPA. Of special concern was the web browser Firefox, which has an optional extension, MAFIAAFire Redirector, that redirects users to a new location for domains that were seized by the U.S. government. In May 2011, Mozilla refused a request by the United States Department of Homeland Security to remove MAFIAAFire from its website, questioning whether the software had ever been declared illegal.

== Potential effectiveness ==
Edward J. Black, president and CEO of the Computer & Communications Industry Association, wrote in the Huffington Post that "Ironically, it would do little to stop actual pirate websites, which could simply reappear hours later under a different name, if their numeric web addresses aren't public even sooner. Anyone who knows or has that web address would still be able to reach the offending website."

An editorial in the San Jose Mercury-News stated, "Imagine the resources required to parse through the millions of Google and Facebook offerings every day looking for pirates who, if found, can just toss up another site in no time."

John Palfrey of the Berkman Center for Internet & Society commented, "DNS filtering is by necessity either overbroad or underbroad; it either blocks too much or too little. Content on the Internet changes its place and nature rapidly, and DNS filtering is ineffective when it comes to keeping up with it."

== Technical issues ==
=== Deep-packet inspection and privacy ===
According to Markham Erickson, head of NetCoalition, which opposes SOPA, the section of the bill that would allow judges to order internet service providers to block access to infringing websites to customers located in the United States would also allow the checking of those customers' IP address, a method known as IP address blocking. Erickson has expressed concerns that such an order might require those providers to engage in "deep packet inspection," which involves analyzing all of the content being transmitted to and from the user, raising new privacy concerns.

Policy analysts for New America Foundation say this legislation would "instigate a data obfuscation arms race" whereby by increasingly invasive practices would be required to monitor users' web traffic resulting in a "counterproductive cat-and-mouse game of censorship and circumvention [that] would drive savvy scofflaws to darknets while increasing surveillance of less technically proficient Internet users".

=== Domain Name System ===
The Domain Name System (DNS) servers, sometimes likened to a telephone directory, translate browser requests for domain names into the IP address assigned to that computer or network. The original bill requires these servers to stop referring requests for infringing domains to their assigned IP addresses. DNS is robust by design against failure and requires that a lack of response is met by inquiries to other DNS servers.

Andrew Lee, CEO of ESET North America, objected that since the bill would require internet service providers to filter DNS queries for the sites, this would undermine the integrity of the Domain Name System.

According to David Ulevitch, the San Francisco-based head of OpenDNS, the passage of SOPA could cause Americans to switch to DNS providers located in other countries who offer encrypted links, and may cause U.S. providers, such as OpenDNS itself, to move to other countries, such as the Cayman Islands.

In November 2011, an anonymous top-level domain, .bit, was launched outside of ICANN control, as a response to the perceived threat from SOPA, although its effectiveness (as well as the effectiveness of other alternative DNS roots) remains unknown.

On January 12, 2012, House sponsor Lamar Smith announced that provisions related to DNS redirection would be pulled from the bill.

=== Internet security ===
A white paper by several internet security experts, including Steve Crocker and Dan Kaminsky, wrote, "From an operational standpoint, a resolution failure from a nameserver subject to a court order and from a hacked nameserver would be indistinguishable. Users running secure applications need to distinguish between policy-based failures and failures caused, for example, by the presence of an attack or a hostile network, or else downgrade attacks would likely be prolific."

=== Domain Name System Security Extensions ===
Stewart Baker, former first Assistant Secretary for Policy at the Department of Homeland Security and former General Counsel of the National Security Agency, stated that SOPA would do "great damage to Internet security" by undermining Domain Name System Security Extensions (DNSSEC), a proposed security upgrade for DNS, since a browser must treat all redirects the same, and must continue to search until it finds a DNS server (possibly overseas) providing untampered results. On December 14, 2011, he wrote that SOPA was "badly in need of a knockout punch" due to its impact on security and DNS:

from the [Attorney General]'s point of view, the browser's efforts to find an authoritative DNS server will look like a deliberate effort to evade his blocking order. The latest version of SOPA will feed that view. It allows the AG to sue "any entity that knowingly and willfully provides ... a product ... designed by such entity or by another in concert with such entity for the circumvention or bypassing of" the AG's blocking orders. It's hard to escape the conclusion that this provision is aimed squarely at the browser companies. Browsers implementing DNSSEC will have to circumvent and bypass criminal blocking, and in the process, they will also circumvent and bypass SOPA orders.

DNSSEC is a set of protocols developed by the Internet Engineering Task Force (IETF) for ensuring internet security. A white paper by the Brookings Institution noted, "The DNS system is based on trust", adding that DNSSEC was developed to prevent malicious redirection of DNS traffic, and that "other forms of redirection will break the assurances from this security tool".

On November 17, Sandia National Laboratories, a research agency of the U.S. Department of Energy, released a technical assessment of the DNS filtering provisions in the House and Senate bills, in response to Representative Zoe Lofgren's (D-CA) request. The assessment stated that the proposed DNS filtering would be unlikely to be effective, would negatively impact internet security, and would delay full implementation of DNSSEC.

On November 18, House Cybersecurity Subcommittee chair Dan Lungren stated that he had "very serious concerns" about SOPA's impact on DNSSEC, adding, "we don't have enough information, and if this is a serious problem as was suggested by some of the technical experts that got in touch with me, we have to address it".

== Transparency in enforcement ==
Brooklyn Law School professor Jason Mazzone warned, "Much of what will happen under SOPA will occur out of the public eye and without the possibility of holding anyone accountable. For when copyright law is made and enforced privately, it is hard for the public to know the shape that the law takes and harder still to complain about its operation."

== Supporters ==
=== Legislators ===
The Stop Online Piracy Act was introduced by Representative Lamar Smith (R-TX) and was initially co-sponsored by Howard Berman (D-CA), Marsha Blackburn (R-TN), Mary Bono Mack (R-CA), Steve Chabot (R-OH), John Conyers (D-MI), Ted Deutch (D-FL), Elton Gallegly (R-CA), Bob Goodlatte (R-VA), Timothy Griffin (R-AR), Dennis A. Ross (R-FL), Adam Schiff (D-CA) and Lee Terry (R-NE). As of January 16, 2012, there were 31 sponsors.

=== Companies and organizations ===
The legislation has broad support from organizations that rely on copyright, including the Motion Picture Association of America, the Recording Industry Association of America, Entertainment Software Association, Macmillan US, Viacom, and various other companies and unions in the cable, movie, and music industries. Supporters also include trademark-dependent companies such as Nike, L'Oréal, and Acushnet Company.

Both the AFL–CIO and the U.S. Chamber of Commerce support H.R. 3261, and many trade unions and industry groups large and small, have also publicly praised the legislation. In a joint statement, the American Federation of Musicians (AFM), American Federation of Television and Radio Artists (AFTRA), Directors Guild of America (DGA), International Alliance of Theatrical Stage Employees, Moving Picture Technicians, Artists and Allied Crafts of the United States, Its Territories and Canada (IATSE), International Brotherhood of Teamsters (IBT), and Screen Actors Guild (SAG) all showed support for SOPA. Smaller trade organizations, such as A2IM, which represents independent musicians, have also backed the bill.

In June 2011, former Bill Clinton press secretary Mike McCurry and former George W. Bush advisor Mark McKinnon, business partners in Public Strategies, Inc., started a campaign which echoed McCurry's earlier work in the network neutrality legislative fight. McCurry represented SOPA/PIPA in Politico as a way to combat theft online, drawing a favorable comment from the MPAA. On the 15th, McCurry and Arts + Labs co-chair McKinnon sponsored the "CREATE – A Forum on Creativity, Commerce, Copyright, Counterfeiting and Policy" conference with members of Congress, artists and information-business executives.

On September 22, 2011, a letter signed by over 350 businesses and organizations—including NBCUniversal, Pfizer, Ford Motor Company, Revlon, NBA, and Macmillan US—was sent to Congress encouraging the passage of the legislation. Fightonlinetheft.com, a website of The Coalition Against Counterfeiting and Piracy (a project of the United States Chamber of Commerce Global Intellectual Property Center,) cites a long list of supporters including these and the Fraternal Order of Police, the National Governors Association, the U.S. Conference of Mayors, the National Association of Attorneys General, the Better Business Bureau, and the National Consumers League.

On November 22, the CEO of the Business Software Alliance (BSA) said, "valid and important questions have been raised about the bill." He said that definitions and remedies needed to be tightened and narrowed, but "BSA stands ready to work with Chairman Smith and his colleagues on the Judiciary Committee to resolve these issues".

On December 5, the Information Technology and Innovation Foundation, a non-partisan non-profit, published an article that blasted critics of SOPA and defended the bill. The report called opponents' claims about DNS filtering "inaccurate," their warnings against censorship as "unfounded" and recommended that the legislation be revised and passed into law.

On December 22, GoDaddy, one of the world's largest domain name registrars, stated that it supported SOPA. GoDaddy then rescinded its support, its CEO saying, "Fighting online piracy is of the utmost importance, which is why GoDaddy has been working to help craft revisions to this legislation—but we can clearly do better. It's very important that all Internet stakeholders work together on this. Getting it right is worth the wait. GoDaddy will support it when and if the Internet community supports it."

In January 2012, the Entertainment Software Association announced support for SOPA, although some association members expressed opposition. Creative America, a group representing television networks, movie studios, and entertainment unions, produced a "fact vs. fiction" flyer that aimed to correct misperceptions about rogue sites legislation.

=== Others ===
Professor and Intellectual Property rights lawyer, Hillel I. Parness, a Partner of Robins, Kaplan, Miller & Ciresi has reviewed the bill, stating in a legal analysis that "There's a court involved here." In regards to "safe harbors," he stated the safe harbor provisions created by the DMCA in 1998 would still apply. "I think the proponents of the bill would say, what we're looking at today is a very different kind of Internet. The fact that the courts have said that entities like YouTube can be passive when it comes to copyright infringement, and just wait for notices rather than having to take any affirmative action, is also frustrating to them", he said. Regarding censorship concerns, he explained that none of the criminal copyright statutes in the bill were new, and therefore, "if there was a risk of abuse, that risk has always been there. And I have confidence in the structure of our court system, that the prosecutors and the courts are held to certain standards that should not allow a statute such as this to be manipulated in that way."

Constitutional law expert Floyd Abrams, on behalf of the American Federation of Television and Radio Artists (AFTRA), the Directors Guild of America (DGA), the International Alliance of Theatrical and Stage Employees (IATSE), the Screen Actors Guild (SAG), the Motion Picture Association of America (MPAA) and others, reviewed the proposed legislation and concluded, "The notion that adopting legislation to combat the theft of intellectual property on the Internet threatens freedom of expression and would facilitate, as one member of the House of Representatives recently put it, 'the end of the Internet as we know it,' is thus insupportable. Copyright violations have never been protected by the First Amendment and have been routinely punished wherever they occur; including the Internet. This proposed legislation is not inconsistent with the First Amendment; it would protect creators of speech, as Congress has done since this Nation was founded, by combating its theft."

== White House position ==
On January 14, 2012, the Obama administration responded to a petition against the bill, stating that while it would not support legislation with provisions that could lead to Internet censorship, squelching of innovation, or reduced Internet security, it encouraged "all sides to work together to pass sound legislation this year that provides prosecutors and rights holders new legal tools to combat online piracy originating beyond U.S. borders while staying true to the principles outlined above in this response." More than 100,000 people petitioned the White House in protest. Three officials from the Obama administration articulated the White House's position on proposed anti-piracy legislation, balancing the need for strong antipiracy measures while respecting both freedom of expression and the way information and ideas are shared on the Internet. "While we believe that online piracy by foreign websites is a serious problem that requires a serious legislative response, we will not support legislation that reduces freedom of expression, increases cybersecurity risk, or undermines the dynamic, innovative global Internet."

== Opposition ==
=== Legislators ===
House Minority Leader Nancy Pelosi (D-CA) expressed opposition to the bill, as well as Representatives Darrell Issa (R-CA) and presidential candidate Ron Paul (R-TX), who joined nine Democrats to sign a letter to other House members warning that the bill would cause "an explosion of innovation-killing lawsuits and litigation". "Issa said the legislation is beyond repair and must be rewritten from scratch", reported The Hill. Issa and Lofgren announced plans for legislation offering "a copyright enforcement process modeled after the U.S. International Trade Commission's (ITC) patent infringement investigations". Politico referred to support as an "election liability" for legislators. Subsequently, proponents began hinting that key provisions might be deferred with opponents stating this was inadequate.

=== Companies and organizations ===
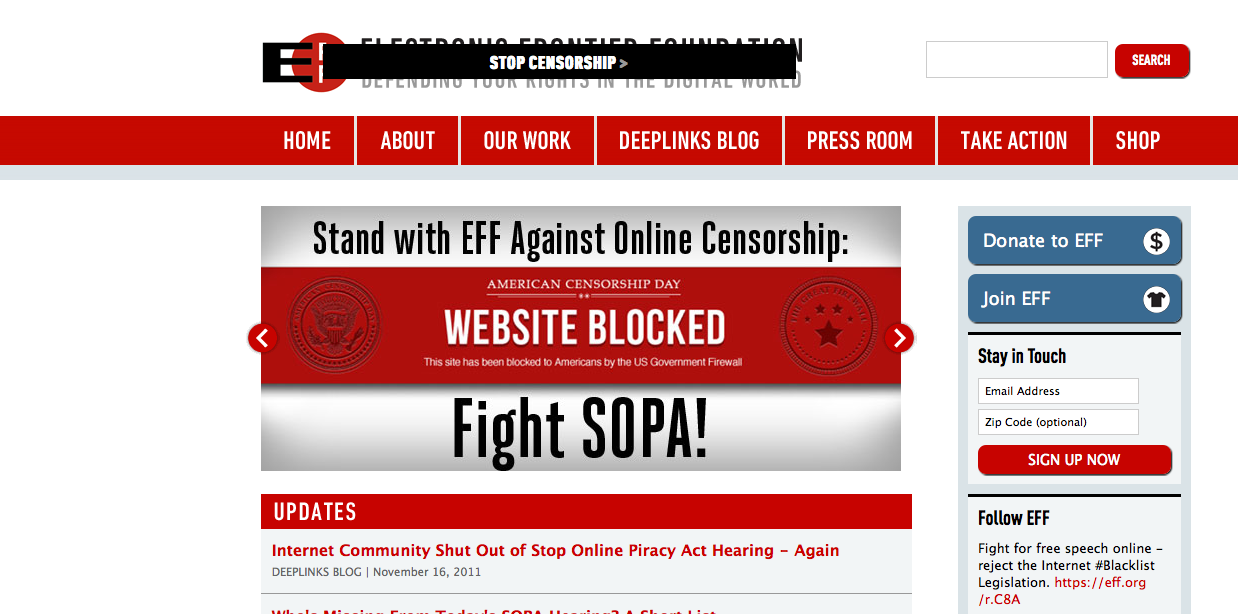
EFF home page with the American Censorship Day banner

Opponents include protest organizer, Fight for the Future, Google, Yahoo!, YouTube, Facebook, Twitter, AOL, LinkedIn, eBay, Mozilla Corporation, Mojang, Riot Games, Epic Games, Reddit, Wikipedia and the Wikimedia Foundation, in addition to human rights organizations such as Reporters Without Borders, the Electronic Frontier Foundation (EFF), the ACLU, and Human Rights Watch.

Kaspersky Lab, a major computer security company, demonstrated its opposition to SOPA and "decided to discontinue its membership in the BSA".

On December 13, 2011, Julian Sanchez of the libertarian think tank Cato Institute came out in strong opposition to the bill saying that while the amended version "trims or softens a few of the most egregious provisions of the original proposal... the fundamental problem with SOPA has never been these details; it's the core idea. The core idea is still to create an Internet blacklist..."

The Library Copyright Alliance (including the American Library Association) objected to the broadened definition of "willful infringement" and the introduction of felony penalties for noncommercial streaming infringement, stating that these changes could encourage criminal prosecution of libraries. A Harvard law professor's analysis said that this provision was written so broadly that it could make mainstream musicians felons for uploading covers of other people's music to sites like YouTube.

On November 22, Mike Masnick of Techdirt called SOPA "toxic" and published a detailed criticism of the ideas underlying the bill, writing that "one could argue that the entire Internet enables or facilitates infringement", and saying that a list of sites compiled by the entertainment industry included the personal site of one of their own artists, 50 Cent, and legitimate internet companies. The article questioned the effect of the bill on $2 trillion in GDP and 3.1 million jobs, with a host of consequential problems on investment, liability and innovation. Paul Graham, the founder of venture capital company Y Combinator opposed the bill, and banned all SOPA-supporting companies from their "demo day" events. "If these companies are so clueless about technology that they think SOPA is a good idea", he asks, "how could they be good investors?" Prominent pro-democracy movement, Avaaz.org started a petition in protest over SOPA and so far has got over 3.4 million signatures worldwide.

The Center for Democracy and Technology maintains a list of SOPA and PIPA opponents consisting of the editorial boards of The New York Times, the Los Angeles Times, 34 other organizations and hundreds of prominent individuals.

Zynga Game Network, creator of Facebook games Texas HoldEm Poker and FarmVille, wrote to the sponsors of both bills highlighting concerns over the effect on "the DMCA's safe harbor provisions ... [which]... have been a cornerstone of the U.S. Technology and industry's growth and success", and opposing the bill due to its impact on "innovation and dynamism".

=== Others ===
Computer scientist Vint Cerf, one of the founders of the Internet, now Google vice president, wrote to Smith, saying "Requiring search engines to delete a domain name begins a worldwide arms race of unprecedented 'censorship' of the Web", in a letter published on CNet.

On December 15, 2011, a second hearing was scheduled to amend and vote on SOPA. Many opponents remained firm even after Smith proposed a 71-page amendment to the bill to address concerns. NetCoalition, which works with Google, Twitter, eBay, and Facebook, appreciated that Smith was listening, but says it nonetheless could not support the amendment. Issa stated that Smith's amendment, "retains the fundamental flaws of its predecessor by blocking Americans' ability to access websites, imposing costly regulation on Web companies and giving Attorney General Eric Holder's Department of Justice broad new powers to police the Internet".

In December 2011, screenwriter and comics writer Steve Niles spoke out against SOPA, commenting, "I know folks are scared to speak out because a lot of us work for these companies, but we have to fight. Too much is at stake."

In January 2012, novelist, screenwriter and comics writer Peter David directed his ire at the intellectual property pirates whose activities he felt provoked the creation of SOPA. While expressing opposition to SOPA because of his view that the then-current language of the bill would go too far in its restriction of free expression, and would probably be scaled down, David argued that content pirates, such as the websites that had posted his novels online in their entirety for free downloads, as well as users who supported or took advantage of these activities, could have prevented SOPA by respecting copyright laws.

Twenty-one artists signed an open letter to Congress urging them to exercise extreme caution, including comedian Aziz Ansari, The Lonely Island music parody band, MGMT, OK Go, Jason Mraz and Trent Reznor of Nine Inch Nails. The letter reads, "As creative professionals, we experience copyright infringement on a very personal level. Commercial piracy is deeply unfair and pervasive leaks of unreleased films and music regularly interfere with the integrity of our creations. We are grateful for the measures policymakers have enacted to protect our works. [...] We fear that the broad new enforcement powers provided under SOPA and PIPA could be easily abused against legitimate services like those upon which we depend. These bills would allow entire websites to be blocked without due process, causing collateral damage to the legitimate users of the same services - artists and creators like us who would be censored as a result." Filmmaker Michael Moore also shut down his websites during the week of protest, while other celebrities, including Ashton Kutcher, Alec Baldwin, and rapper B.o.B expressed their opposition via Twitter. The Daily Show's Jon Stewart stated that SOPA will "break the Internet".

According to a New York Times report (February 8, 2012), Art Brodsky of Public Knowledge said, "The movie business is fond of throwing out numbers about how many millions of dollars are at risk and how many thousands of jobs are lost ... We don't think it correlates to the state of the industry." The report also noted that "some in the internet world, including Tim O'Reilly, ... go so far as to question whether illegitimate downloading and sharing is such a bad thing. In fact, some say that it could even be a boon to artists and other creators." Tim O'Reilly is quoted as saying, "The losses due to piracy are far outweighed by the benefits of the free flow of information, which makes the world richer, and develops new markets for legitimate content ... Most of the people who are downloading unauthorized copies of O'Reilly books would never have paid us for them anyway."

== International response ==
Organizations in the international civil and human rights community expressed concerns that SOPA would cause the United States to lose its position as a global leader in supporting a free and open Internet for public good.

On November 18, 2011, the European Parliament adopted by a large majority a resolution that "stresses the need to protect the integrity of the global Internet and freedom of communication by refraining from unilateral measures to revoke IP addresses or domain names".

Private individuals petitioned the Foreign and Commonwealth Office, asking for the British government to condemn the bill.

Vice-President of the European Commission and European Commissioner for Digital Agenda Neelie Kroes said she is "Glad [the] tide is turning on SOPA," explaining rather than having "bad legislation" there "should be safeguarding benefits of open net". "Speeding is illegal too but you don't put speed bumps on the motorway", she said.

== Protest actions ==
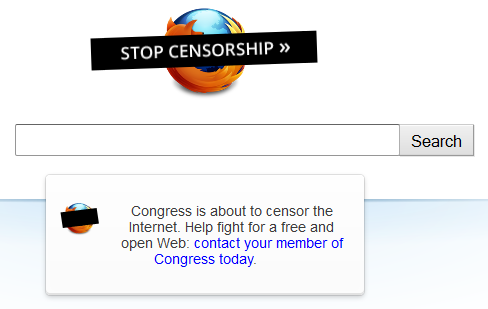
Mozilla's SOPA protest, displayed in Firefox on November 16, 2011

On November 16, 2011, Tumblr, Mozilla, Techdirt, the Center for Democracy and Technology were among many Internet companies that protested by participating in American Censorship Day. They displayed black banners over their site logos with the words "STOP CENSORSHIP."

Google linked an online petition to its site, and says it collected more than 7 million signatures from the United States.

Markham Erickson, executive director of NetCoalition, told Fox News that "a number of companies have had discussions about [blacking out services]" and discussion of the option spread to other media outlets.

In January 2012, Reddit announced plans to black out its site for twelve hours on January 18, as company co-founder Alexis Ohanian announced he was going to testify to Congress. "He's of the firm position that SOPA could potentially 'obliterate' the entire tech industry", Paul Tassi wrote in Forbes. Tassi also opined that Google and Facebook would have to join the blackout to reach a sufficiently broad audience. Other prominent sites that planned to participate in the January 18 blackout were Cheezburger Sites, Mojang, Major League Gaming, Boing Boing, BoardGameGeek, xkcd, SMBC and The Oatmeal.

Wider protests were considered and in some cases committed to by major internet sites, with high-profile bodies such as Google, Facebook, Twitter, Yahoo, Amazon, AOL, Reddit, Mozilla, LinkedIn, IAC, eBay, PayPal, WordPress and Wikimedia being widely named as "considering" or committed to an "unprecedented" internet blackout on January 18, 2012. On January 17, a Republican aide on Capitol Hill said that the protests were making their mark, with SOPA having already become "a dirty word beyond anything you can imagine".

A series of pickets against the bill were held at the U.S. Embassy in Moscow. Two picketers were arrested.

Fight for the Future, a non-profit, digital-rights advocacy group opposing the bill, said the protests against the bills were the biggest in Internet history, with over 115,000 sites known to have altered their webpages, 45,000 (39%) of which were WordPress blogs, among unknowably many uncounted ones.

SOPA supporters complained that the bill was being misrepresented amidst the protests. RIAA spokesman Jonathan Lamy said, "It's a dangerous and troubling development when the platforms that serve as gateways to information intentionally skew the facts to incite their users and arm them with misinformation", a sentiment echoed by RIAA CEO Cary Sherman who said "it's very difficult to counter the misinformation when the disseminators also own the platform". At the American Constitution Society's 2012 National Convention, the Democratic Party's chief counsel to the United States House Judiciary Subcommittee on Courts, Intellectual Property and the Internet said that the protests were "orchestrated by misinformation by a few actors," adding that "activism is welcome on the Hill, but... There's this thing called 'mob rule', and it's not always right."

=== Wikipedia blackout ===
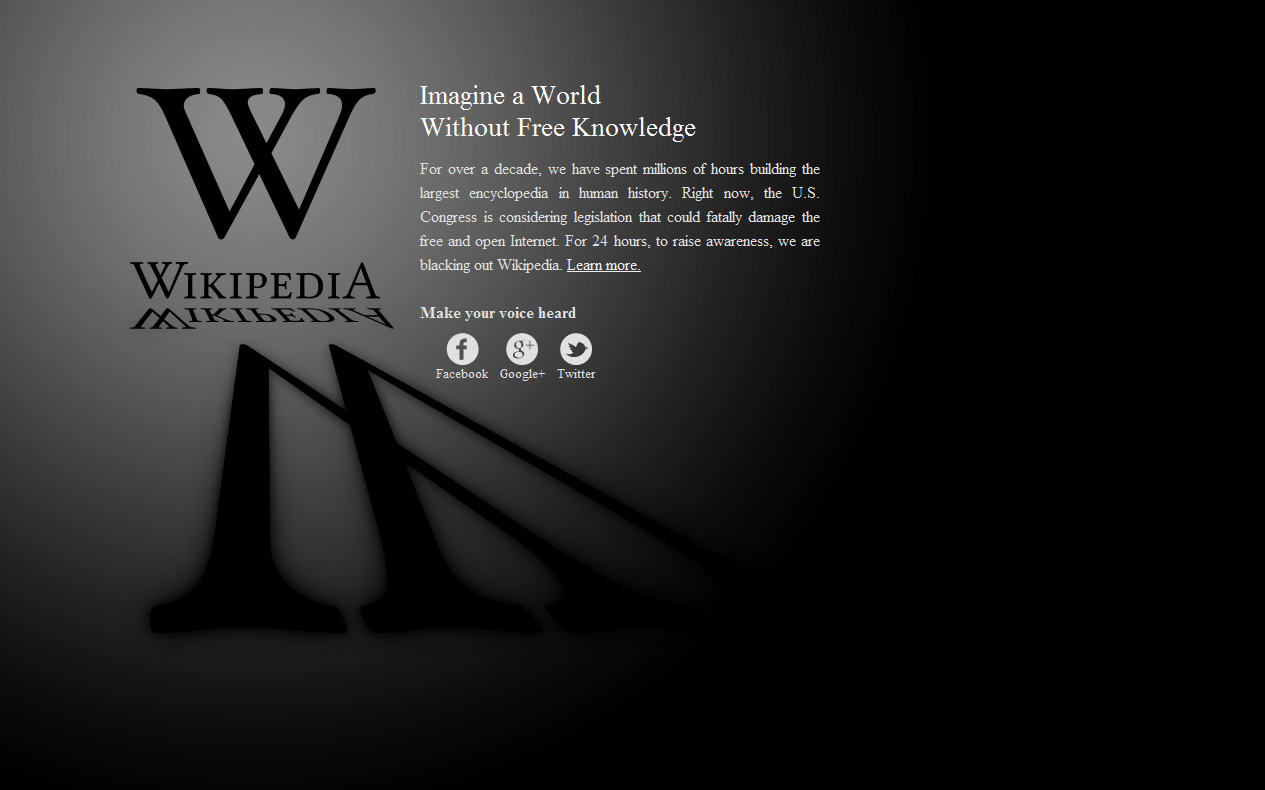
The English-language Wikipedia page on January 18, 2012, illustrating its international blackout in opposition to SOPA

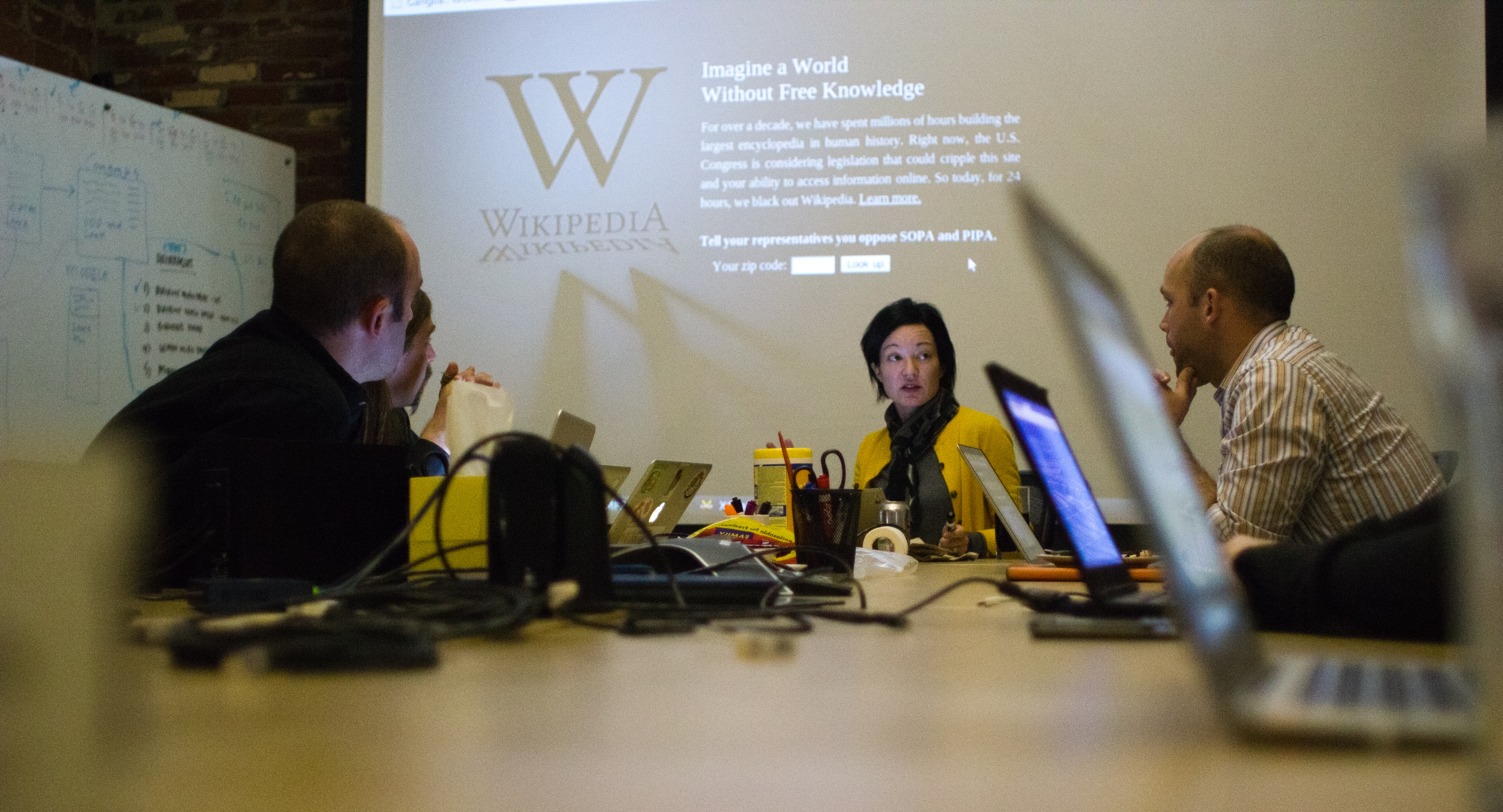
Sue Gardner at the Wikimedia Foundation on the evening of January 17, 2012, discussing the English Wikipedia blackout

The English Wikipedia blackout occurred for 24 hours on January 18–19, 2012. In place of articles (with the exception of those for SOPA and PIPA themselves), the site showed only a message in protest of SOPA and PIPA asking visitors to "Imagine a world without free knowledge." It is estimated in excess of 160 million people saw the banner. A month earlier, Wikipedia co-founder Jimmy Wales initiated discussion with editors regarding a potential knowledge blackout, a protest inspired by a successful campaign by the Italian-language Wikipedia to block the Italian DDL intercettazioni bill, terms of which could have infringed the encyclopedia's editorial independence. Editors and others mulled interrupting service for one or more days as in the Italian protest, or presenting site visitors with a blanked page directing them to further information before permitting them to complete searches. On January 16, the Wikimedia Foundation announced that the English-language Wikipedia would be blacked out for 24 hours on January 18.

SOPA's sponsor in the House, Chairman Smith, called Wikipedia's blackout a "publicity stunt" saying: "It is ironic that a website dedicated to providing information is spreading misinformation about the Stop Online Piracy Act." Smith went on to insist that SOPA "will not harm Wikipedia, domestic blogs or social networking sites".

=== Megaupload shutdown consequences ===
On January 19, Megaupload, a Hong Kong–based company providing file sharing services, was shut down by the US Department of Justice and the Federal Bureau of Investigation. Some commentators and observers have asserted that the FBI shutdown of Megaupload proves that SOPA and PIPA are unnecessary.

== Legislative history ==
The House Judiciary Committee held hearings on November 16 and December 15, 2011. The committee was scheduled to continue debate in January 2012, but on January 17 Chairman Smith said that "Due to the Republican and Democratic retreats taking place over the next two weeks, markup of the Stop Online Piracy Act is expected to resume in February." However, in the wake of online protests held on January 18, 2012, Rep. Lamar Smith has stated, "The House Judiciary Committee will postpone consideration of the legislation until there is wider agreement on a solution", and Sen. Reid announced that the PIPA test vote scheduled for January 24 would also be postponed.

=== November 16 House Judiciary Committee hearing ===
At the House Judiciary Committee hearing, there was concern among some observers that the set of speakers who testified lacked technical expertise. Technology news site CNET reported "One by one, each witness—including a lobbyist for the Motion Picture Association of America—said they weren't qualified to discuss... DNSSEC." Adam Thierer, a senior research fellow at the Mercatus Center, similarly said, "The techno-ignorance of Congress was on full display. Member after member admitted that they really didn't have any idea what impact SOPA's regulatory provisions would have on the DNS, online security, or much of anything else."

Lofgren stated, "We have no technical expertise on this panel today." She also criticized the tone of the hearing, saying, "It hasn't generally been the policy of this committee to dismiss the views of those we are going to regulate. Impugning the motives of the critics instead of the substance is a mistake."

Lungren told Politico's Morning Tech that he had "very serious concerns" about SOPA's impact on DNSSEC, adding "we don't have enough information, and if this is a serious problem as was suggested by some of the technical experts that got in touch with me, we have to address it. I can't afford to let that go by without dealing with it."

Gary Shapiro, CEO of the Consumer Electronics Association, stated, "The significant potential harms of this bill are reflected by the extraordinary coalition arrayed against it. Concerns about SOPA have been raised by Tea Partiers, progressives, computer scientists, human rights advocates, venture capitalists, law professors, independent musicians, and many more. Unfortunately, these voices were not heard at today's hearing."

An editorial in Fortune wrote, "This is just another case of Congress doing the bidding of powerful lobbyists—in this case, Hollywood and the music industry, among others. It would be downright mundane if the legislation weren't so draconian and the rhetoric surrounding it weren't so transparently pandering."

=== December 15 markup of the bill ===
Since its introduction, a number of opponents to the bill have expressed concerns. The bill was presented for markup by the House Judiciary Committee on December 15.

An aide to Smith stated that "He is open to changes but only legitimate changes. Some site[s] are totally capable of filtering illegal content, but they won't and are instead profiting from the traffic of illegal content."

==== Markup outcome ====
After the first day of the hearing, more than 20 amendments had been rejected, including one by Darrell Issa which would have stripped provisions targeting search engines and Internet providers. PC World reported that the 22–12 vote on the amendment could foreshadow strong support for the bill by the committee.

The Committee adjourned on the second day agreeing to continue debate early in 2012. Smith announced a plan to remove the provision that requires Internet service providers to block access to certain foreign websites. On January 15, 2012, Issa said he has received assurances from Rep. Eric Cantor that the bill would not come up for a vote until a consensus could be reached.

== MPAA's continued efforts to enact SOPA principles ==
The 2014 Sony Pictures hack revealed that the MPAA had continued its efforts to enact SOPA-like blocking principles since the bill died in Congress. The emails indicated that the MPAA was actively exploring new strategies to implement SOPA-like regulations, such as using the All Writs Act to "allow [the MPAA] to obtain court orders requiring site blocking without first having to sue and prove the target ISPs are liable for copyright infringement." The MPAA has also allied itself with National Association of Attorneys General president Jim Hood, who supports SOPA principles and has stated that "Google's not a government… they don't owe anyone a First Amendment right… [i]f you're an illegal site, you ought to clean up your act, instead of Google making money off it." On November 27, 2013, Hood sent a letter to Google outlining his grievances. It was later revealed that much of the letter was drafted by the law firm representing the MPAA.

On October 21, 2014, Hood issued a subpoena to Google for information about, among other items, its advertising partnerships and practices concerning illegal and sexual content. Google requested an injunction to quash the subpoena from the United States District Court of the Southern District of Mississippi, Northern Division, and had the request fulfilled on March 2, 2015. The injunction also prevented Hood from bringing a charge against Google for making third-party content available to internet users. Effectively, the injunction protected Google from having Hood's claims enforced until after the conclusion of the case.

An MPAA spokesperson criticized Google's use of the First Amendment, accusing the company of using freedom of speech "as a shield for unlawful activities." Leaders in the technology industry commended the federal court for issuing the injunction. In addition, one of Google's head lawyers noted that "[w]e're pleased with the court's ruling, which recognizes that the MPAA's long-running campaign to censor the web—which started with SOPA—is contrary to federal law."

== See also ==
- Anti-Counterfeiting Trade Agreement (ACTA)
- Combating Online Infringement and Counterfeits Act (COICA)
- Commercial Felony Streaming Act
- Children's Online Privacy Protection Act (COPPA)
- Copyright bills in the 112th United States Congress
- Copyright Term Extension Act (CTEA)
- Cybercrime Prevention Act of 2012 (Philippines)
- Cyber Intelligence Sharing and Protection Act
- Digital Economy Act 2010 (in the UK)
- Ley Sinde
- Preventing Real Online Threats to Economic Creativity and Theft of Intellectual Property Act (PROTECT IP Act, or PIPA), the corresponding Senate bill
- Protecting Children from Internet Pornographers Act of 2011
- Protests against SOPA and PIPA
- Russian State Duma Bill 89417-6
- Splinternet
- Trans-Pacific Partnership
- Trans-Pacific Strategic Economic Partnership (TPP)
- European Directive on Copyright in the Digital Single Market, which passed the European Parliament in March 2019 despite similar protests to the ones against SOPA/PIPA, expands copyright liability to websites. Also known as the "meme ban" among critics.
