= PROTECT IP Act =

US Senate Bill

- Long title: Preventing Real Online Threats to Economic Creativity and Theft of Intellectual Property Act of 2011
- Acronyms (colloquial): PIPA

Legislative history
- Introduced in the Senate as S. 968 by Patrick Leahy (D–VT) on May 12, 2011

The PROTECT IP Act (Preventing Real Online Threats to Economic Creativity and Theft of Intellectual Property Act, or PIPA) was a proposed law with the stated goal of giving the US government and copyright holders additional tools to curb access to "rogue websites dedicated to the sale of infringing or counterfeit goods", especially those registered outside the U.S. The bill was introduced on May 12, 2011, by Senator Patrick Leahy (D-VT) and 11 bipartisan co-sponsors. The Congressional Budget Office estimated that implementation of the bill would cost the federal government $47 million through 2016, to cover enforcement costs and the hiring and training of 22 new special agents and 26 support staff. The Senate Judiciary Committee passed the bill, but Senator Ron Wyden (D-OR) placed a hold on it.

The PROTECT IP Act is a re-write of the Combating Online Infringement and Counterfeits Act (COICA), which failed to pass in 2010. A similar House version of the bill, the Stop Online Piracy Act (SOPA), was introduced on October 26, 2011.

In the wake of online protests held on January 18, 2012, Senate Majority Leader Harry Reid announced that a vote on the bill would be postponed until issues raised about the bill were resolved.

== Content ==
The bill defines infringement as distribution of illegal copies, counterfeit goods, or anti-digital rights management technology. Infringement exists if "facts or circumstances suggest [the site] is used, primarily as a means for engaging in, enabling, or facilitating the activities described." The bill says that it does not alter existing substantive trademark or copyright law.

The bill provides for "enhancing enforcement against rogue websites operated and registered overseas" and authorizes the United States Department of Justice to seek a court order in rem against websites dedicated to infringing activities, if through due diligence, an individual owner or operator cannot be located. The bill requires the Attorney General to serve notice to the defendant. Once the court issues an order, it could be served on financial transaction providers, Internet advertising services, Internet service providers, and information location tools to require them to stop financial transactions with the rogue site and remove links to it. The term "information location tool" is borrowed from the Digital Millennium Copyright Act and is understood to refer to search engines but could cover other sites that link to content.

The PROTECT IP Act says that an "information location tool shall take technically feasible and reasonable measures, as expeditiously as possible, to remove or disable access to the Internet site associated with the domain name set forth in the order". In addition, it must delete all hyperlinks to the offending "Internet site".

Nonauthoritative domain name servers would be ordered to take technically feasible and reasonable steps to prevent the domain name from resolving to the IP address of a website that had been found by the court to be "dedicated to infringing activities." The website could still be reached by its IP address, but links or users that used the website's domain name would not reach it. Search engines—such as Google—would be ordered to "(i) remove or disable access to the Internet site associated with the domain name set forth in the [court] order; or (ii) not serve a hypertext link to such Internet site."

Trademark and copyright holders who have been harmed by the activities of a website dedicated to infringing activities would be able to apply for a court injunction against the domain name to compel financial transaction providers and Internet advertising services to stop processing transactions to and placing ads on the website but would not be able to obtain the domain name remedies available to the Attorney General.

== Supporters ==
=== Legislators ===
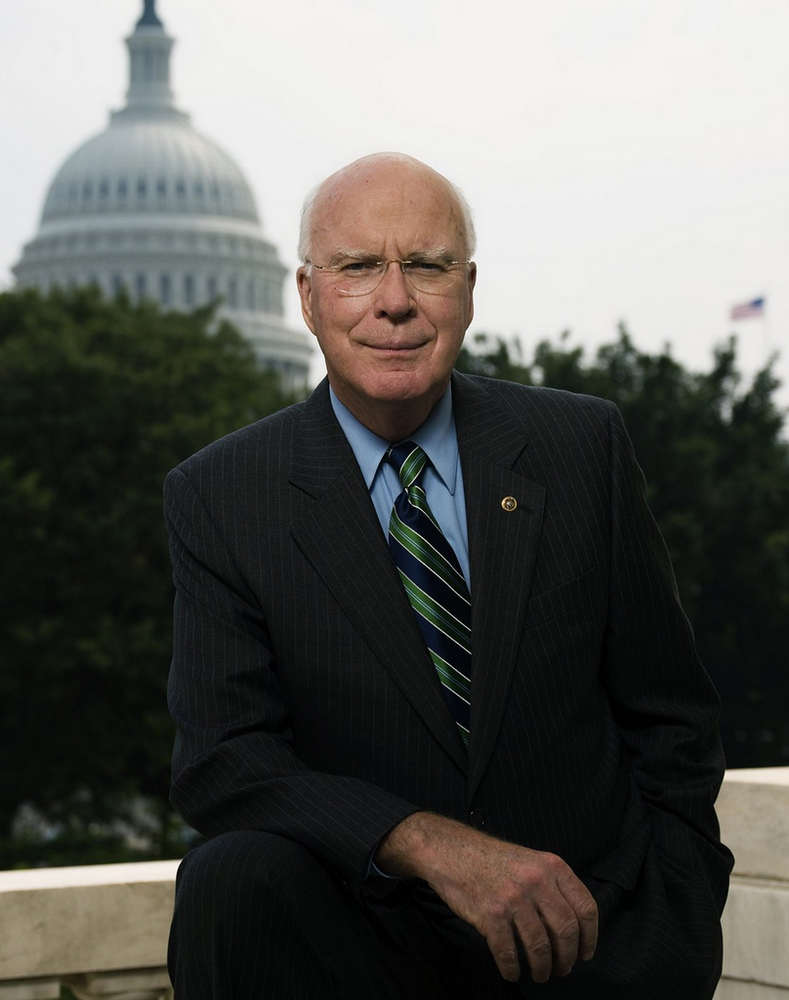
Sen. Patrick Leahy (D-Vt.)

The PROTECT IP Act has received bipartisan support in the Senate, with introduction sponsorship by Senator Patrick Leahy (D-VT), and, as of December 17, 2011, co-sponsorship by 40 Senators.

=== Companies and trade organizations ===
The bill is supported by copyright and trademark owners in business, industry, and labor groups, spanning all sectors of the economy. Supporters include the National Cable & Telecommunications Association, the Independent Film & Television Alliance, the National Association of Theatre Owners, the Motion Picture Association of America, the Directors Guild of America, the American Federation of Musicians, the American Federation of Television and Radio Artists, the International Alliance of Theatrical Stage Employees, the Screen Actors Guild, International Brotherhood of Teamsters, Nashville Songwriters Association International, Songwriters Guild of America, Viacom, Institute for Policy Innovation, Macmillan Publishers, Acushnet Company, Recording Industry Association of America, Copyright Alliance and NBCUniversal.

The U.S. Chamber of Commerce and AFL–CIO have come together in support of the bill. In May and September 2011, two letters signed by 170 and 359 businesses and organizations, respectively—including the National Association of Manufacturers (NAM), the Small Business & Entrepreneurship Council, Nike, 1–800 Pet Meds, L'Oreal, Rosetta Stone, Pfizer, Ford Motor Company, Revlon, NBA, and Sony—were sent to Congress which endorsed the Act and encouraged the passage of legislation to protect intellectual property and shut down rogue websites. David Hirschmann of the Chamber of Commerce complained about the state of the political debate in January 2012, saying that talk of loss of freedoms and censorship "has nothing to do with the substance of the bills." Hirschmann promised "to use every tool in our toolbox to make sure members of Congress know what's in these bills."

=== Others ===
Constitutional expert Floyd Abrams, representing the MPAA and related trade groups, wrote a Letter to Congress stating that the proposed PROTECT IP Act is constitutionally sound.

Daniel Castro of the Information Technology and Innovation Foundation (ITIF), a think tank funded in part by the Information Technology Industry Council and the publisher of a 2009 report titled "Steal These Policies" that formed the basis for both SOPA and PIPA, defended PIPA's predecessor bill (COICA) in March 2011, saying "nobody's talking about taking down someone's personal website because they happen to use a copyrighted photo." In January 2012 ITIF Senior Research Fellow Richard Bennett said that criticism of the legislation was misinformed and overblown: "[t]he critics either don't understand what the bills do or are misrepresenting what the bills do. There's sort of a hysterical climate of criticism where people are objecting to something the bills don't do and are promoting noble causes like free speech and democracy but there is not much connection between what they are complaining about and what's in the legislation."

== Opponents ==
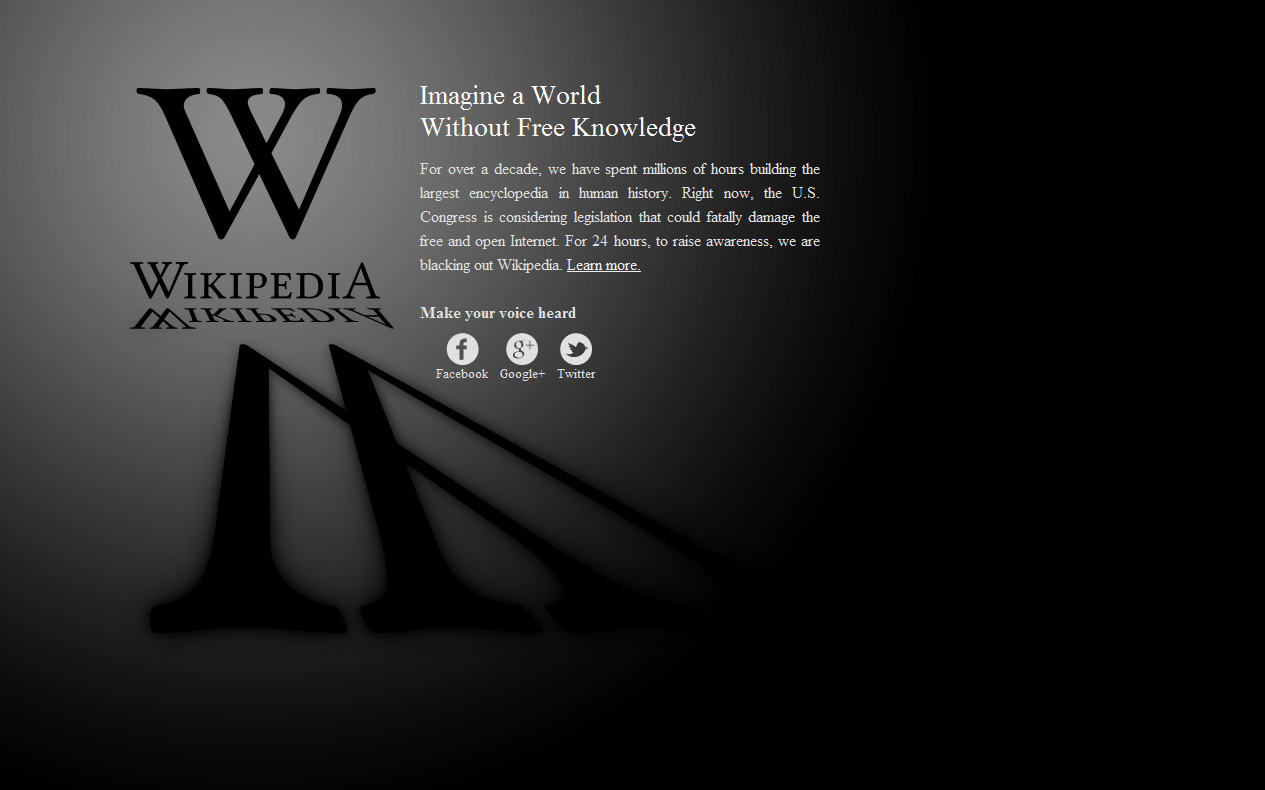
The English-language Wikipedia page on January 18, 2012, illustrating its international blackout in opposition to SOPA and PIPA.

=== Legislators ===
Oregon Senator Ron Wyden (D) has publicly voiced opposition to the legislation, and placed a Senate hold on it in May 2011, citing concerns over possible damage to freedom of speech, innovation, and Internet integrity. Massachusetts Senator Scott Brown (R) has also Opponents

The English-language Wikipedia page on January 18, 2012, illustrating its international blackout in opposition to SOPA and PIPA.

Oregon Senator Ron Wyden (D) has publicly voiced opposition to the legislation, and placed a Senate hold on it in May 2011, citing concerns over possible damage to freedom of speech, innovation, and Internet integrity. Massachusetts Senator Scott Brown (R) has also publicly announced his opposition to the bill and its House counterpart, SOPA. In addition to individual opposition, a bipartisan group of lawmakers led by Senator Wyden and Representative Darrell Issa proposed an alternative bill known as the Online Protection and Enforcement of Digital Trade Act (OPEN Act) to address intellectual property theft without compromising internet freedom.

=== Companies and organizations ===
Among those who oppose the legislation are the Mozilla Corporation, Facebook, Electronic Frontier Foundation, Yahoo!, eBay, American Express, Reddit, Google, Reporters Without Borders, Human Rights Watch, English Wikipedia, Entertainment Consumers Association and Uncyclopedia. Internet entrepreneurs including Reid Hoffman of LinkedIn, Twitter co-founder Evan Williams, and Foursquare co-founder Dennis Crowley signed a letter to Congress expressing their opposition to the legislation. The Tea Party Patriots have argued that the bill "is bad for consumers". A letter of opposition was signed by 130 technology entrepreneurs and executives and sent to Congress to express their concern that the law in its present form would "hurt economic growth and chill innovation in legitimate services that help people create, communicate, and make money online". English-language Wikipedia sites joined other Internet sites in protesting the PIPA and SOPA legislation by staging a "blackout" of service for 24 hours on January 18, 2012. Many websites protested, including: Wikipedia, CNet and Cheezburger network sites. Some websites denied access to their websites altogether. Campaigner Peter Bradwell of the Open Rights Group argues how this act could have a negative influence among other countries who are also considering this bill. "These two bills are too broad and so badly worded that perfectly lawful sites could be censored. One reason we're joining these protests is that we face very similar issues in UK copyright-enforcement policies. Highlighting these flaws should help UK policymakers avoid making the same mistakes."

=== Others ===
Law professors Mark Lemley (Stanford University), David S. Levine (Elon University), and David G. Post (Temple University) have criticized the PROTECT IP Act and SOPA.

== Reception ==
On January 14, 2012, White House officials posted a statement saying, "Any effort to combat online piracy must guard against the risk of online censorship of lawful activity and must not inhibit innovation by our dynamic businesses large and small", and "We must avoid creating new cybersecurity risks or disrupting the underlying architecture of the Internet."

=== Technical objections to DNS blocking and redirection ===
The bill originally contained measures which would allow the stripping of rogue websites out of the Domain Name System (DNS), the Internet's virtual "phone book." If a user entered the web address of a rogue site, it would appear the site did not exist. The bill's sponsors have said they are removing this provision.

According to Sherwin Siy of Public Knowledge, past attempts to limit copyright infringement online by way of blocking domains have always generated criticism that doing so would fracture the Domain Name System and threaten the global functionality of the Internet, with the original draft of this bill being no different. By design, all domain name servers worldwide should contain identical lists; with the changes initially proposed, servers inside the United States would have records different from their global counterparts, making URLs less universal.

Five Internet engineers (Steve Crocker, David Dagon, Dan Kaminsky, Danny McPherson, and Paul Vixie) prepared a whitepaper which states that the DNS filtering provisions in the original bill "raise serious technical and security concerns" and would "break the Internet", while other engineers and proponents of the act have called those concerns groundless and without merit. One concern expressed by network experts is that hackers would offer workarounds to private users to allow access to government-seized sites, but these workarounds might also jeopardize security by redirecting unsuspecting users to scam websites. Supporters of the bill, such as the MPAA and RIAA, have argued that widespread circumvention of the filtering would be unlikely. The CEO of the Information Technology and Innovation Foundation compared the DNS provisions to car door locks, noting that while they aren't foolproof against thieves, we should still use them.

A group of Law professors, quoting Crocker's whitepaper, say that the PROTECT IP and Stop Online Piracy Acts could have the opposite of the intended impact, driving users to unregulated alternative DNS systems, and hindering the government from conducting legitimate Internet regulation. They question the constitutionality of both bills, believing they could have potentially disastrous technical consequences and would make US Internet law more like those of repressive regimes. They go on to state that both bills provide "nothing more than ex parte proceedings—proceedings at which only one side (the prosecutor or even a private plaintiff) need present evidence and the operator of the allegedly infringing site need not be present nor even made aware that the action was pending against his or her 'property.' This not only violates basic principles of due process by depriving persons of property without a fair hearing and a reasonable opportunity to be heard, it also constitutes an unconstitutional abridgement of the freedom of speech protected by the First Amendment."

A browser plugin called MAFIAAFire Redirector was created in March 2011 that redirects visitors to an alternative domain when a site's primary domain has been seized. The Mozilla Foundation says that United States Department of Homeland Security (DHS) requested by phone that Mozilla remove the plugin, a request with which they have not yet complied. Instead, Mozilla's legal counsel has asked for further information from the DHS, including legal justification for the request.

The Information Technology and Innovation Foundation (ITIF) argued that concerns about the domain name remedy in the legislation were undercut by the already ongoing use of these approaches to counter spam and malware. According to Daniel Castro, an ITIF analyst, DNS blocking is practiced in several democracies without "breaking the internet", including the Netherlands, Austria, Belgium, Denmark, Finland and South Korea. ITIF's CEO compared the DNS provisions to car door locks, writing that even though they aren't foolproof they can still be useful.

On January 12, 2012, Sen. Patrick Leahy (D-VT.), Chairman of the Senate Judiciary Committee, said he would be willing to remove a controversial DNS-filtering provision from the bill. "I've authorized my staff to tell ... the other senators that I'm willing to hold that back in the final piece of legislation," Senator Leahy said. "That in itself will remove a lot of the opposition that we now have." Rep. Lamar Smith (R-TX), primary sponsor of the related House bill also expressed an intent to remove the DNS blocking provisions from SOPA.

=== Civil liberties issues ===
First Amendment scholars Laurence Tribe and Marvin Ammori raised concerns over how the PROTECT IP act would impact free speech, arguing that the act doesn't target just foreign rogue sites, and would extend to "domestic websites that merely 'facilitate' or 'enable' infringement. Thus, in their language, the bills target considerable protected speech on legitimate sites such as YouTube, Twitter, and Facebook." Ammori says that the PROTECT IP Act and the Stop Online Piracy Act "would miss their mark and silence a lot of non-infringing speech."

The bill has been criticized by Abigail Phillips of the Electronic Frontier Foundation for not being specific about what constitutes an infringing web site. For example, if WikiLeaks were accused of distributing copyrighted content, U.S. search engines could be served a court order to block search results pointing to Wikileaks. Requiring search engines to remove links to an entire website altogether due to an infringing page would raise free speech concerns regarding lawful content hosted elsewhere on the site.

Google chairman Eric Schmidt stated that the measures called for in PIPA are overly simple solutions to a complex problem, and that the precedent set by pruning DNS entries is bad from the viewpoint of free speech and would be a step toward less permissive Internet environments, such as China's. As the chairman of the company that owns the world's largest search engine, Schmidt said "If there is a law that requires DNSs to do X and it's passed by both Houses of Congress and signed by the President of the United States and we disagree with it then we would still fight it."

Constitutional law expert Floyd Abrams said, "The Protect IP Act neither compels nor prohibits free speech or communication... the bill sets a high bar in defining when a website or domain is eligible for potential actions by the Attorney General...".

=== Concern for user-generated sites ===
Opponents of the legislation warn that the PROTECT IP Act would have a negative impact on online communities. Journalist Rebecca MacKinnon argued in an op-ed that making companies liable for users' actions could have a chilling effect on user-generated sites like YouTube. "The intention is not the same as China's Great Firewall, a nationwide system of Web censorship, but the practical effect could be similar", she says. Policy analysts for New America Foundation say this legislation would enable law enforcement to take down an entire domain due to something posted on a single blog: "Yes, an entire, largely innocent online community could be punished for the actions of a tiny minority."

=== Business and innovation issues ===
A legal analysis by the Congressional Research Service (CRS) notes concerns by opponents such as American Express and Google that the inclusion of a private cause of action would result in stifled Internet innovation, protect outdated business models and at the cost of an overwhelming number of suits from content producers. "Legislation should not include a private right of action that would invite suits by 'trolls' to extort settlements from intermediaries or sites who are making good faith efforts to comply with the law," Google Senior Vice-president and General Counsel Kent Walker has said in Congressional testimony.

"Rogue sites jeopardize jobs for film and TV workers," according to the Motion Picture Association of America, which cites several government and independent industry studies on the effects of online piracy, including a report by Envisional Ltd. which concluded that one quarter of the content on the internet infringes copyright. The Recording Industry Association of America points to a 2007 study by the Institute for Policy Innovation which found that online piracy caused $12.5 billion in losses to the U.S. economy and more than 70,000 lost jobs.

"If we need to amend the DMCA, let's do it with a negotiation between the interested parties, not with a bill written by the content industry's lobbyists and jammed through Congress on a fast track," wrote venture capitalist and Business Insider columnist Fred Wilson in an October 29 editorial on the changes that the House and Senate versions of the proposed legislation would make to the safe harbor provisions of the DMCA. "Companies like Apple, Google, Facebook, and startups like Dropbox, Kickstarter, and Twilio are the leading exporters and job creators of this time. They are the golden goose of the economy and we cannot kill the golden goose to protect industries in decline," he said. The impact of the law on small businesses and entrepreneurs may also be disproportionate due to the high costs of complying with its legal, technical and administrative requirements.

== Online protests against the bill and announcement of delay ==
On January 18, 2012, widespread online protests against SOPA and PIPA were held that included an English Wikipedia blackout. These protests were initiated when Fight for the Future organized thousands of the most popular websites in the world, including Reddit, Craigslist, and the English Wikipedia, to consider temporarily closing their content and redirecting users to a message opposing the proposed legislation. Several senators who sponsored PIPA, including Roy Blunt (R-MO) and John Boozman (R-AR) announced that they would withdraw support for the bill; on January 20 Senate Majority Leader Reid announced that a vote on PIPA would be postponed. Senator Leahy issued a press release stating that he understood Reid's decision "but the day will come when the Senators who forced this move will look back and realize they made a knee-jerk reaction to a monumental problem. Somewhere in China today, in Russia today, and in many other countries that do not respect American intellectual property, criminals who do nothing but peddle in counterfeit products and stolen American content are smugly watching how the United States Senate decided it was not even worth debating how to stop the overseas criminals from draining our economy."

== See also ==
- Anti-Counterfeiting Trade Agreement (ACTA)
- Commercial Felony Streaming Act (Bill S.978)
- Communications Decency Act, contains pertinent definition of "interactive computer service"
- Copyright bills in the 2011-2012 United States Congress
- Copyright Term Extension Act, increased the length of copyright to as much as 120 years in some cases
- Cyber Intelligence Sharing and Protection Act
- PRO-IP Act, a 2008 law cited as a legal basis for Operation In Our Sites
- Protests against SOPA and PIPA
- Protecting Children from Internet Pornographers Act of 2011, another proposed law which may create online privacy issues.
- Stop Online Piracy Act (SOPA), the corresponding House bill
- Trade group efforts against file sharing
- Trans-Pacific Partnership
- Trans-Pacific Strategic Economic Partnership
