= List of organizations with official stances on SOPA and PIPA =

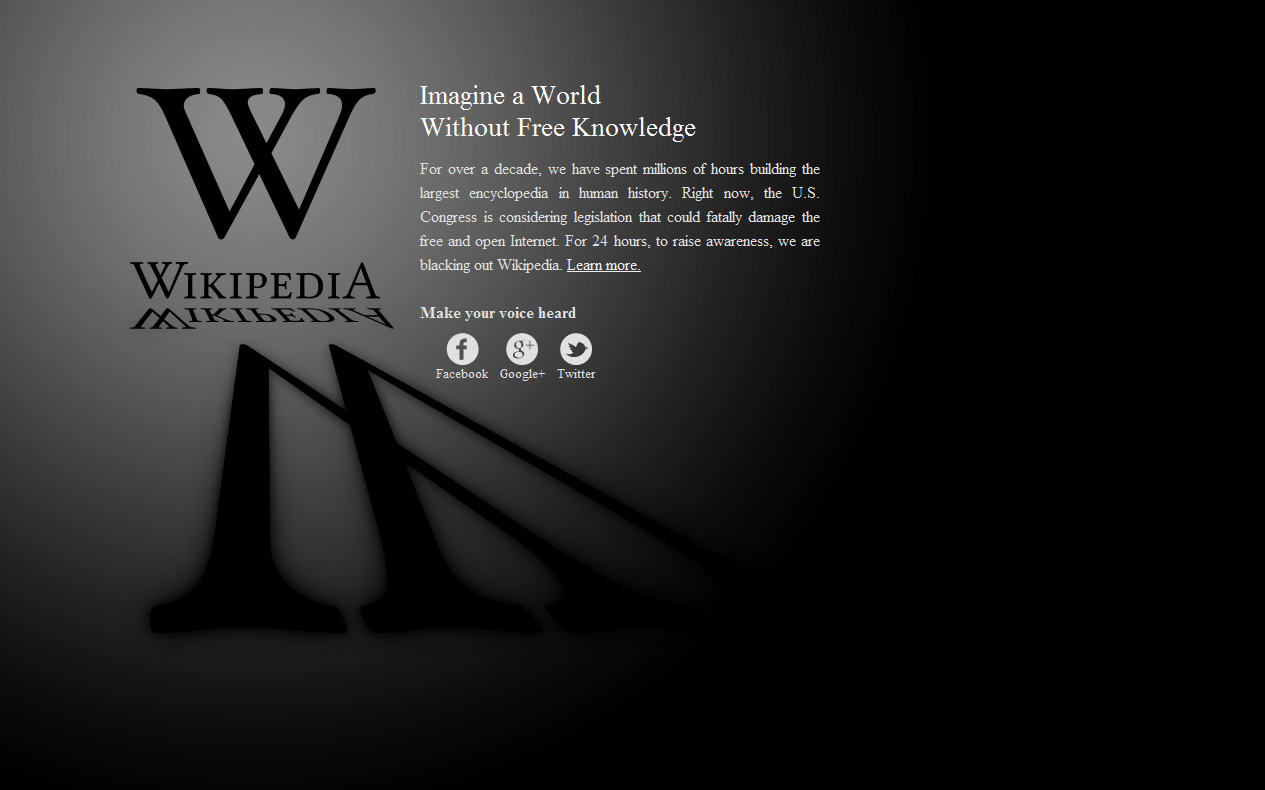
The landing page of English Wikipedia on January 18, 2012, during the site's blackout.

The Stop Online Piracy Act (SOPA) and PROTECT IP Act (PIPA) found broad support from organizations that rely on copyright, including the Motion Picture Association of America, the Recording Industry Association of America, Macmillan Publishers, Viacom, and various other companies and unions in the cable, movie, and music industries.

On December 22, 2011, Lamar Smith, the bill's sponsor, released a list of 142 organizations that support SOPA on the House Judiciary Committee's website. Other lists have been released by the organizations themselves.

Following the list's original release, it was updated multiple times. As of the morning of December 29, 2011, the official list had 18 fewer supporters, including only 124 of the original 142 supporters. The growing publicity of this list on websites such as Reddit resulted in what might be referred to as a public relations disaster for some of the supporters listed. Arguably the first and most prominent case regarded GoDaddy.com, a popular internet domain registrar and web hosting company which openly supported SOPA. GoDaddy sustained significant losses, losing over 72,000 domains in less than one week, as a result of a proposed boycott of their services, pending it renounce its support of SOPA. GoDaddy has since announced that it "no longer supports SOPA legislation," then amended that statement to "GoDaddy OPPOSES SOPA."

== Organizations supporting SOPA ==
Organizations that support the Stop Online Piracy Act include:

- 60 Plus Association
- Actors' Equity Association
- ABC
- Alliance for Safe Online Pharmacies (ASOP)
- American Bankers Association (ABA)
- American Federation of Musicians (AFM)
- American Federation of Television and Radio Artists (AFTRA)
- American Society of Composers, Authors and Publishers (ASCAP)
- Americans for Tax Reform
- Artists and Allied Crafts of the United States
- Association of American Publishers (AAP)
- Association of State Criminal Investigative Agencies
- Association of Talent Agents (ATA)
- Best Host News (BHN)
- BMI
- BMG Rights Management
- Building and Construction Trades Department
- Capitol Records Nashville
- CBS
- Cengage Learning
- Christian Music Trade Association
- Church Music Publishers' Association
- Coalition Against Online Video Piracy (CAOVP)
- Comcast
- NBCUniversal
- Concerned Women for America (CWA)
- Congressional Fire Services Institute
- Copyhype
- Copyright Alliance
- Coty, Inc.
- Council of Better Business Bureaus (CBBB)
- Council of State Governments
- Country Music Association
- Country Music Television
- Creative America
- Deluxe Digital Studios
- Directors Guild of America (DGA)
- Disney Publishing Worldwide, Inc.
- Elsevier
- Entertainment Consumers Association
- ESPN
- Estée Lauder Companies
- Foundation for Job Creation
- Fraternal Order of Police (FOP)
- Gospel Music Association
- Hachette Book Group
- HarperCollins Publishers Worldwide, Inc.
- Hyperion Books
- Independent Film & Television Alliance (IFTA)
- Information Technology and Innovation Foundation (ITIF)
- International Alliance of Theatrical and Stage Employees (IATSE)
- International AntiCounterfeiting Coalition (IACC)
- International Brotherhood of Electrical Workers (IBEW)
- International Brotherhood of Teamsters (IBT)
- International Trademark Association (INTA)
- International Union of Police Associations
- L'Oréal
- Lost Highway Records
- Macmillan
- Major County Sheriffs
- Major League Baseball
- Majority City Chiefs
- Marvel Entertainment, LLC
- MasterCard Worldwide
- MCA Records
- McGraw-Hill Education
- Mercury Nashville
- Minor League Baseball (MiLB)
- Minority Media & Telecom Council (MMTC)
- Motion Picture Association of America (MPAA)
- Moving Picture Technicians
- MPA – The Association of Magazine Media
- National Association of Manufacturers (NAM)
- National Association of Prosecutor Coordinators
- National Association of State Chief Information Officers
- National Basketball Association (NBA)
- National Cable & Telecommunications Association (NCTA)
- National Center for Victims of Crime
- National Criminal Justice Association
- National District Attorneys Association
- National Domestic Preparedness Coalition
- National Football League (NFL)
- National Governors Association, Economic Development and Commerce Committee
- National League of Cities
- National Narcotics Officers' Associations' Coalition
- National Sheriffs' Association (NSA)
- National Songwriters Association
- National Troopers Coalition
- News Corporation
- Pearson Education
- Penguin Group (USA), Inc.
- Pharmaceutical Research and Manufacturers of America (PhRMA)
- Pfizer, Inc.
- Provident Music Group
- Random House
- Raulet Property Partners
- Republic Nashville
- Revlon
- Scholastic, Inc.
- Screen Actors Guild (SAG)
- SESAC
- Showdog Universal Music
- Sony/ATV Music Publishing
- Sony Music Entertainment
- Sony Music Nashville
- State International Development Organization (SIDO)
- The National Association of Theatre Owners (NATO)
- Perseus Books Group
- United States Conference of Mayors
- Tiffany & Co.
- Time Warner
- True Religion Brand Jeans
- UMG Publishing Group Nashville
- Uncyclopedia (parodying Wikipedia)
- United States Chamber of Commerce
- United States Conference of Catholic Bishops
- United States Olympic Committee
- United States Tennis Association
- Universal Music
- Universal Music Publishing Group
- Viacom
- Visa Inc.
- W.W. Norton & Company
- Wallace Bajjali Development Partners, L.P.
- Warner Music Group
- Warner Music Nashville
- Wolters Kluwer Health
- Word Entertainment
- Zuffa, LLC
- Zumba Fitness, LLC

Note: 125 Organizations are listed.

=== Removed supporting organizations ===
Organizations that have had their names removed from the list of supporters of the Stop Online Piracy Act include:

- Apple Inc.
- Baker & Hostetler LLP
- Beachbody, LLC
- Covington & Burling LLP
- Cowan, DeBaets, Abrahams & Sheppard LLP
- Cowan, Liebowitz & Latman, P.C.
- Davis Wright Tremaine LLP
- EMI
- Entertainment Software Association (ESA)
- Go Daddy
- Graphic Artists Guild
- Irell & Manella LLP
- Jenner & Block LLP
- Kelley Drye & Warren LLP
- Kendall Brill & Klieger LLP
- Kinsella Weitzman Iser Kump & Aldisert LLP
- Lathrop & Gage LLP
- Loeb & Loeb LLP
- Mitchell Silberberg & Knupp LLP
- Morrison & Foerster LLP
- Patterson Belknap Webb & Tyler LLP
- Phillips Nizer, LLP
- Proskauer Rose LLP
- Robins, Kaplan, Miller & Ciresi LLP
- Shearman & Sterling LLP
- Simpson Thacher & Bartlett LLP
- Skadden, Arps, Slate, Meagher & Flom LLP

Note: 27 organizations are listed. (based on comparison between original 142 count list and current list as of December 29, 2011).

== Organizations opposing SOPA ==
- 38 Studios
- 4chan
- 7iber.com
- Amazon.com
- American Association of Law Libraries
- American Civil Liberties Union
- American Library Association
- Americans for Job Security
- American Society of News Editors
- Anonymous
- AOL
- Ars Technica
- Association of College and Research Libraries
- Association of Research Libraries
- Benetech
- BoardGameGeek
- BoingBoing
- Brookings Institution
- BuzzFeed
- Center for Democracy and Technology
- Cheezburger Network
- Cliche Games
- CloudFlare
- Competitive Enterprise Institute
- Computer & Communication Industry Association
- Consumer Electronics Association
- Consumer Federation of America
- Consumers Union
- cPanel
- Craigslist
- Creative Commons
- Creators' Freedom Project
- The Daily Californian
- Daily Kos
- The Daily WTF
- Demand Progress
- Democracy for America
- Democratic Underground
- Destructoid
- DeviantArt
- Diaspora
- Dinosaur Comics
- Disqus
- Domain.com
- Don't Censor the Net
- DreamHost
- DuckDuckGo
- eBay
- Educause
- Encyclopaedia Metallum
- Engine Advocacy
- Entertainment Consumers Association
- Electronic Frontier Foundation
- Embedly
- Epic Games
- ESET
- Etsy
- Facebook
- Fark
- Fight for the Future
- Flickr
- foursquare
- Freedom House
- Freepress.org
- Frozenbyte
- Funny or Die
- Future of Music Coalition
- The Ginever Alliance
- GigaOM
- Girls with Slingshots
- GitHub
- Gizmodo
- Good Magazine
- Good Old Games
- Google
- Greenpeace
- Grooveshark
- Hack a Day
- Hacker News
- Harvard Law School
- Heritage Action
- The Heritage Foundation
- HostGator
- Hover
- The Huffington Post
- The Hype Machine
- IAC
- identi.ca
- IGN
- Imgur
- Information Technology Industry Council
- Institute for Intellectual Property & Social Justice
- Internet Archive
- Internet Society
- Irregular Times
- Kaspersky Lab
- Kickstarter
- Know Your Meme
- Kornspace
- Lea-Linux
- Library Copyright Alliance
- LinkedIn
- Linode
- Los Angeles Times
- MAAWG
- Major League Gaming
- The Massachusetts Daily Collegian
- Massachusetts Institute of Technology Admissions
- McSweeney's
- Media Access Project
- Media Temple
- Megaupload
- Mercury Radio Arts
- MetaFilter
- Microsoft
- Middlebury College
- Minnesota Daily
- Miro
- Mojang
- MoveOn.org
- Mozilla Foundation
- NameCheap
- Name.com
- National Association of the Deaf
- NetCoalition.com
- New America Foundation's Open Technology Initiative
- Newgrounds
- The New York Times
- Nival
- NVIDIA
- The Oatmeal
- The Obama Administration
- The Oklahoma Daily
- OpenDNS
- The Orange County Register
- Open Rights Group
- O'Reilly Media
- PayPal
- PerezHilton.com
- Petzel
- Pop17
- Pornhub
- PPF (Open Congress)
- Pressthink.org
- The Pirate Bay
- Public Interest Registry
- Public Knowledge
- phpBB
- Questionable Content
- Quora
- Rackspace
- Rate Your Music
- The Raw Story
- Razer
- Red 5 Studios
- Red Hat
- Reddit
- Reporters Without Borders
- Riot Games
- Rock, Paper, Shotgun
- Runic Games
- San Jose Mercury News
- SaveHosting.org
- Scribd
- Sega
- ServInt
- Silicon Knights
- SiteGround
- A Small Orange
- A Softer World
- Something Positive
- SongMeanings
- SparkFun Electronics
- Special Libraries Association
- Surviving the World
- The Spectrum
- Square
- Stack Exchange/Stack Overflow
- StopBadware
- Syracuse University School of Information Studies
- Tea Party Patriots
- TechAmerica
- TechCrunch
- Techdirt
- TechFreedom
- Texts From Last Night
- Tor
- TorrentFreak
- Trion Worlds
- Tucows
- Tumblr
- Turntable.fm
- Twitpic
- Twitter
- The Verge/Vox Media
- UrbanDictionary
- U.S. PIRG The Federation of State PIRGs
- United States Student Association
- Urbanspoon
- Vimeo
- WebOS Internals
- Wikia
- Wikimedia Foundation
- Wired
- WordPress
- World Wide Web Virtual Library
- Writers Guild of America, West
- xda-developers
- XVideos
- Yahoo!
- Y Combinator
- Zynga

Note: 224 Organizations are listed.

For a complete list, see http://www.sopastrike.com/on-strike/

== See also ==
- English Wikipedia blackout
- Freedom of information
- List of US Congresspersons who support or oppose SOPA/PIPA
- Trans-Pacific Partnership
