= Move Your Domain Day =

Former annual observance

- Screenshot of Namecheap's Move Your Domain Day promotion
- Observed by: Webmasters, Internet activists
- Significance: Caused thousands of domain transfers
- Date: 29 December 2011, 22 January 2013, 5 February 2014, 27 January 2015, 2 February 2016, 6 March 2018
- Frequency: 6 times

Move Your Domain Day, or MoveYourDomainDay, was an annual observance encouraging owners of domain names to transfer their domain registration away from registrars that supported the Stop Online Piracy Act (SOPA), as part of the protests against SOPA. It was first held on 29 December 2011, the idea coming from a post on Reddit as a protest against prominent registrar GoDaddy's support for SOPA. In 2012, rival registrar Namecheap began an initiative to make Move Your Domain Day an annual event. Subsequent events were held on 22 January 2013, 5 February 2014, 27 January 2015, 2 February 2016, and 6 March 2018. The Electronic Frontier Foundation, Reddit, and domain registrars Name.com and Hover have also participated. Namecheap has defined the initiative as "an annual protest and a commemoration of sorts that will continue to shine a light on the issue of a free and open internet". No major Move Your Domain Day events have taken place since 2018.

== Events ==
=== 2011 event ===
The movement likely originated from a post made on Reddit on 22 December 2011, when a user stated that he would be moving 51 domains away from GoDaddy, and recommended others to do the same. The thread received significant attention from the Reddit community, gaining over 37,000 upvotes from users (but also over 32,000 downvotes) in favor of the initiative and many comments criticizing GoDaddy's support of the measure.

Notable examples of the backlash against GoDaddy include Ben Huh, CEO of the Cheezburger Network, who threatened to transfer over one thousand domains away from GoDaddy, and Wikimedia Foundation, the nonprofit company behind many websites including Wikipedia, which decided to move all its domains away from GoDaddy. In response to the backlash, numerous domain registrars offered coupons for discounted domain transfers, while also offering to donate a portion of profits to the Electronic Frontier Foundation. GoDaddy itself changed its stance on SOPA in the days prior to 29 December in an attempt to minimize damage.

Reports up to 29 December described GoDaddy as "hemorrhaging" customers. On 25 December 2011 (Christmas Day), GoDaddy lost a net 16,191 domains, mostly as a result of the boycott. However, on 29 December itself, GoDaddy gained a net of 20,748 domains, twice as many as it lost that day, attributed by Techdirt to a number of causes, in particular customers having moved early, and an appeased customer response to their change of position over SOPA.

=== 2013 event ===
In late 2012, Namecheap relaunched the initiative and set the date for the second Move Your Domain Day as 22 January 2013. On that day, Namecheap announced that domain transfers would be greatly discounted, and between $0.50 and $1.50 per domain transferred would be donated to the EFF (depending on the total number of transfers). In response to this announcement, Shari Steele, the executive director of the EFF, stated that the "EFF is pleased to join Namecheap in celebrating digital rights within the greater the Internet community. The funds donated from the Move Your Domain Day effort will ensure EFF can continue to fight for free expression for Internet users worldwide."

=== 2014 event ===
On 5 February 2014, registration of .com, .net, .org, .info and .biz domains had reduced prices of $3.98 for up to 50 domain transfers per account. Only domains that were not transferred from out of Namecheap were able to qualify. Donations were also given to the EFF.

=== 2015 event ===
Namecheap raised over $50,000 from the 2015 Move Your Domain Day event.

=== 2016 event ===
Namecheap held the fifth annual event on February 2, 2016.

=== 2017 ===
No Move Your Domain Day event was held in 2017.

=== 2018 event ===
In 2018, the final event was hosted by Namecheap after none in 2017. For each domain transfer, $1.50 was donated to the EFF. A total of nearly $31,000 was raised that day, bringing the total donated since 2011 to more than $392,000.

== See also ==
- Black World Wide Web protest
- Grassroots
- Internet activism
