= Cosmic Ray Deflection Society =

Satirical/environmental pseudoscientific organization

The Cosmic Ray Deflection Society is a satirical/environmental pseudoscientific organization, based in New Orleans, Louisiana. A worldwide membership of over 250 members, the group purports to believe the "deadly cosmic rays" are getting in through the hole in the ozone layer.

== History ==
It was organized in May 1984, by Also Aswell, in Greensboro, North Carolina, as a response to reports on the impending destruction of the ozone layer.

From the official website:

Knowing, that in some future time, when the ozone layer has been further destroyed by man-made chemicals such as Chlorofluorocarbon and exhaust fumes, the earth and its inhabitants will be mercilessly bombarded by deadly cosmic rays, the Cosmic Ray Deflection Society of North America, Inc. has been organized to discover ways of surviving the coming onslaught...Krudzna Ink is a loosely knit organization of crazed, forward thinking environmentalists dedicated to the survival of the human race in general, and life on the planet in particular...

In order to save themselves, members purport to believe:

An Anti-Cosmic Ray Suit (ACRaS) would be constructed! Man-made items that are really unnecessary and have no real value for our lives were attached to a hat and a shirt... By believing the collection of trinkets, tickets, plastics, toys, auto parts, jewelries, beads, buttons, and other trivial items would repel the cosmic rays, the CRs were actually repelled!!!

Members of the group call the point at which the cosmic rays actually start being repelled Critical Mass:

As you attach each piece to your cosmic ray deflection item be it hat, shirt, car, house, shield or footgear, you think that this will be the item that gives you critical mass...At some point it actually starts happening!!! We hope...

Members also practice unexpected behaviors, according to the Dysonberg Confusion Principle.

The society's motto is The Hat Comes First. The triangle formed with the tips of the thumbs and forefingers is the secret sign to remember ozone, O3 protects all.

Since the early days of cosmic ray deflection, several art cars, or Cosmic Ray Deflection Motor Vehicles, have joined the growing collection of CR items. Members are now working on a Cosmic Ray House and Garden with patio in New Orleans, as well as shields for urban wear.

The organization played an important role in the 1996 Black World Wide Web protest and the follow-up Blue Ribbon Online Free Speech Campaign. As a result, free speech issues were added to the organization's activities.

== Membership ==
The only requirements for membership into the CRDSNA is to build an anti-cosmic ray headpiece, (ACRaH.) and to attempt to read Dhalgren by Samuel R. Delany and The Electric Kool-Aid Acid Test test by Tom Wolfe.

A local chapter is approved by getting three members to make ACRaHs. Local chapters hold monthly covered dish meetings to help build a Cosmic Ray Cookbook for future publication. Chapters are urged to adopt a local outsider artist and help see to their daily needs on an ongoing basis. Chapter activities include promoting local environmental and free speech issues. Robert's Rules of Order govern all meetings.

== Dysonberg confusion principle ==
The Dysonberg confusion principle is the second theory developed by the Cosmic ray Deflection Society, which contends that cosmic rays have a low level of intelligence which allows them to be easily confused by actions contrary to what is considered normal. Once confused, cosmic rays tend to retreat on their own to whence they came.

Members of the satiric Cosmic Ray Deflection Society purport to believe that abnormal actions such as wearing Foster Grant brand sunglasses when not famous, lighting fireworks on Christmas, giving gifts on Independence Day, and celebrating the holiday of "Valloween" on Valentine's Day and Halloween each year confuses the cosmic rays. Then, if the rays are in a sufficient state of confusion, and one is also protected by a cosmic ray suit, one will not be affected by the rays.

== Chapters ==
- New Orleans, Louisiana
- Charleston, South Carolina
- San Francisco, California PDF
- Cosmic Ray Deflection Society of South America
- Greensboro, North Carolina
- Atlanta, Georgia
