= STW (disambiguation) =

STW or StW may refer to:

== Business ==
- Scott Tallon Walker Architects
- Stop the War Coalition, an anti-war group in the United Kingdom

== Mathematics ==
- The Shimura-Taniyama-Weil conjecture, a generalization of Fermat's Last Theorem.

== Music ==
- Salt the Wound, a deathcore band
- Silence the World, third album by the Swedish band Adept

== Television ==
- KSTW, a television station
- Secrets of a Teenage Witch, a 3D animated series
- STW-9, a television station in Perth, Australia
- Scott the Woz, a web comedy review series

== Utility companies ==
- Severn Trent Water
- Sewage treatment, Sewage Treatment Works

== Transport ==
- MTR station code for Sha Tin Wai station, Hong Kong
- National Rail station code for Strawberry Hill railway station, London, England

== Other ==
- Fortnite: Save the World, a survival game
- Search The Web, a milder version of computer jargon acronym STFW
- Shogun: Total War, a PC strategy game.
- Speed through water, nautical term
- Sport Touring Wagon, an alternative marketing name for Crossover (automobile) style vehicles.
- IATA code for Stavropol Shpakovskoye Airport
- Super Tourenwagen Cup, the German Supertouring car championship (until 1999)
- Surviving the World, a daily webcomic.
- "Stop the world", a global pause in a computer program for garbage collection.
- ScrewTurn Wiki, software
