= List of members of the U.S. Congress who support or oppose SOPA/PIPA =

The Stop Online Piracy Act (SOPA) and the PROTECT IP Act (PIPA) are two proposed draft laws that were being considered by the United States Congress. Their stated goals are to increase the ability of U.S. law enforcement to fight online trafficking in copyrighted intellectual property and counterfeit goods, and give the U.S. government and copyright holders additional tools to curb access to "rogue websites dedicated to infringing or counterfeit goods", especially those registered outside the United States.

Supporters of the laws argued that they are needed to protect the intellectual property of owners of content. Opponents of the laws argued that they endanger free speech and free expression by harmfully regulating the internet.

== Supporters of SOPA/PIPA ==
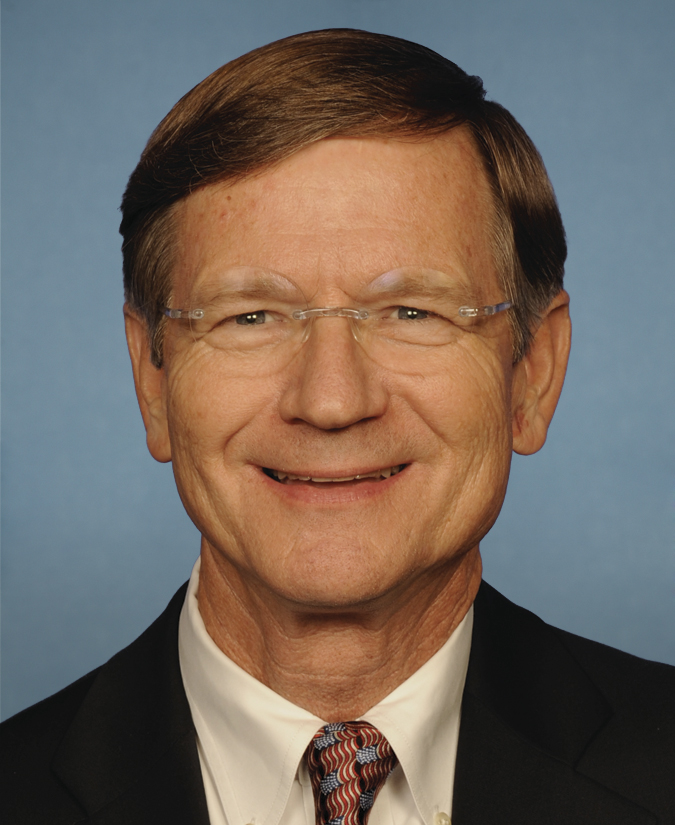
Rep. Lamar Smith (R-TX) introduced the SOPA bill.

SOPA is the bill under consideration by the U.S. House of Representatives. PIPA is the related bill under consideration by the U.S. Senate.

=== SOPA Sponsors ===
The Stop Online Piracy Act was introduced by Representative Lamar Smith (R-TX).

==== Sponsors at introduction ====
SOPA was initially co-sponsored by 12 Representatives:

- Howard Berman (D-CA)
- Mary Bono Mack (R-CA)
- Steve Chabot (R-OH)
- John Conyers (D-MI)
- Ted Deutch (D-FL)
- Elton Gallegly (R-CA)
- Bob Goodlatte (R-VA)
- Adam Schiff (D-CA)
- Marsha Blackburn (R-TN)
- Timothy Griffin (R-AR)
  Withdrew Sponsorship 1/18/2012
- Dennis A. Ross (R-FL)
  Withdrew Sponsorship 1/18/2012
- Lee Terry (R-NE)
  Withdrew Sponsorship, 1/18/2012

==== Subsequent sponsors ====
After its initial introduction, other Representatives became co-sponsors of SOPA:

- Mark Amodei [R-NV2]
- Joe Baca [D-CA43]
- John Barrow [D-GA12]
- Karen Bass [D-CA33]
- John Carter [R-TX31]
  Withdrew Sponsorship 1/24/2012
- Judy Chu [D-CA32]
- Jim Cooper [D-TN5]
- Peter T. King [R-NY3]
- John Larson [D-CT1]
- Ben R. Luján [D-NM3]
  Withdrew Sponsorship 1/23/2012
- Thomas Marino [R-PA10]
- Alan Nunnelee [R-MS1]
- Bill Owens [D-NY23]
- Steve Scalise [R-LA1]
  Withdrew Sponsorship 1/23/2012
- Brad Sherman [D-CA27]
- Debbie Wasserman Schultz [D-FL20]
- Melvin Watt [D-NC12]
- Tim Holden [D-PA-17]
  Withdrew Sponsorship 1/18/2012
- Benjamin Quayle [R-AZ-3]
  Withdrew Sponsorship 1/17/2012

=== Senators who support PIPA ===
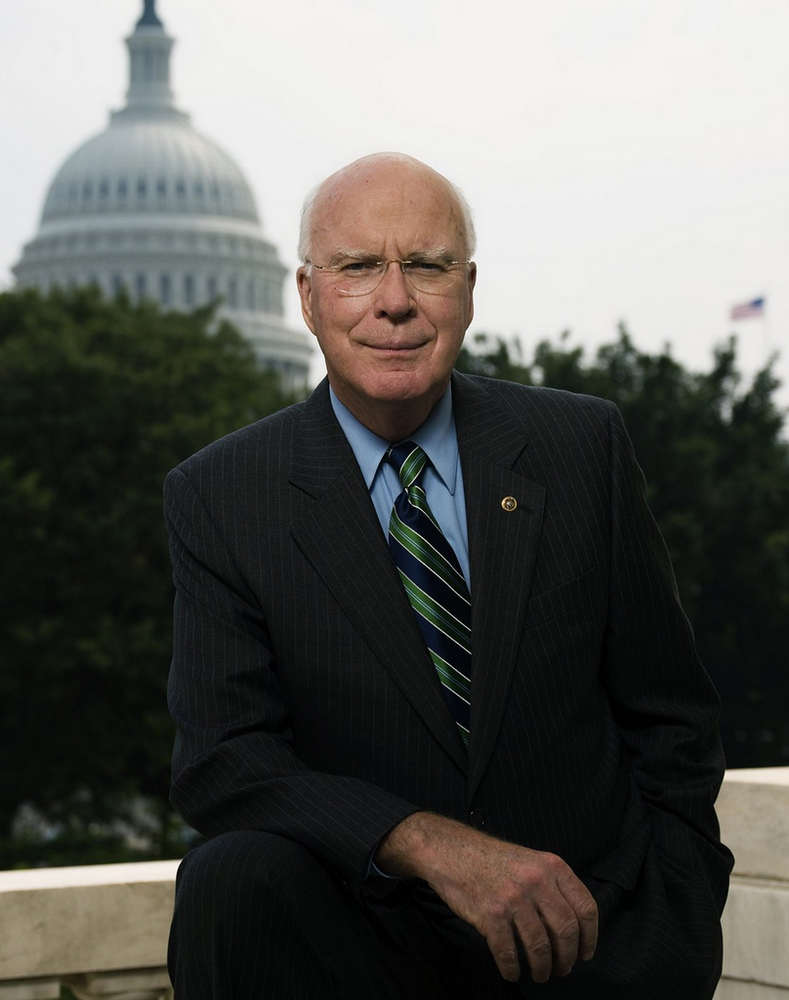
Senator Patrick Leahy (D-VT) introduced the PIPA bill to the US Senate

The Protect IP Act (PIPA) was introduced by Senator Patrick Leahy (D-VT). Senate Majority Leader Harry Reid planned to bring it to a vote on January 24. Reid rejected a request by six Senators for a postponement, saying "this is an issue that is too important to delay".

As of January 17, 2012, PIPA was co-sponsored by:

- Lamar Alexander (R-TN)
- Jeff Bingaman (D-NM)
- Richard Blumenthal (D-CT)
- Barbara Boxer (D-CA)
- Sherrod Brown (D-OH)
- Bob Casey, Jr. (D-PA)
- Saxby Chambliss (R-GA)
- Thad Cochran (R-MS)
- Chris Coons (D-DE)
- Bob Corker (R-TN)
- Dick Durbin (D-IL)
- Mike Enzi (R-WY)
- Dianne Feinstein (D-CA)
- Al Franken (D-MN)
- Kirsten Gillibrand (D-NY)
- Lindsey Graham (R-SC)
- Chuck Grassley (R-IA) Withdrawn 1/18/12
- Kay Hagan (D-NC)
- Johnny Isakson (R-GA)
- Tim Johnson (D-SD)
- Amy Klobuchar (D-MN)
- Herb Kohl (D-WI)
- Mary Landrieu (D-LA)
- Joseph Lieberman (I-CT)
- John McCain (R-AZ)
- Bob Menendez (D-NJ)
- Bill Nelson (D-FL)
- Jim Risch (R-ID)
- Chuck Schumer (D-NY)
- Jeanne Shaheen (D-NH)
- Tom Udall (D-NM)
- Sheldon Whitehouse (D-RI)

== Opponents of SOPA/PIPA ==
=== Representatives opposed to SOPA/PIPA ===
In December 2011, Representative Ron Paul spoke out against SOPA, deriding it as a bill that would "take over the Internet". Paul thus became the first major presidential candidate to publicly oppose the SOPA.

U.S. Representatives opposed to SOPA/PIPA

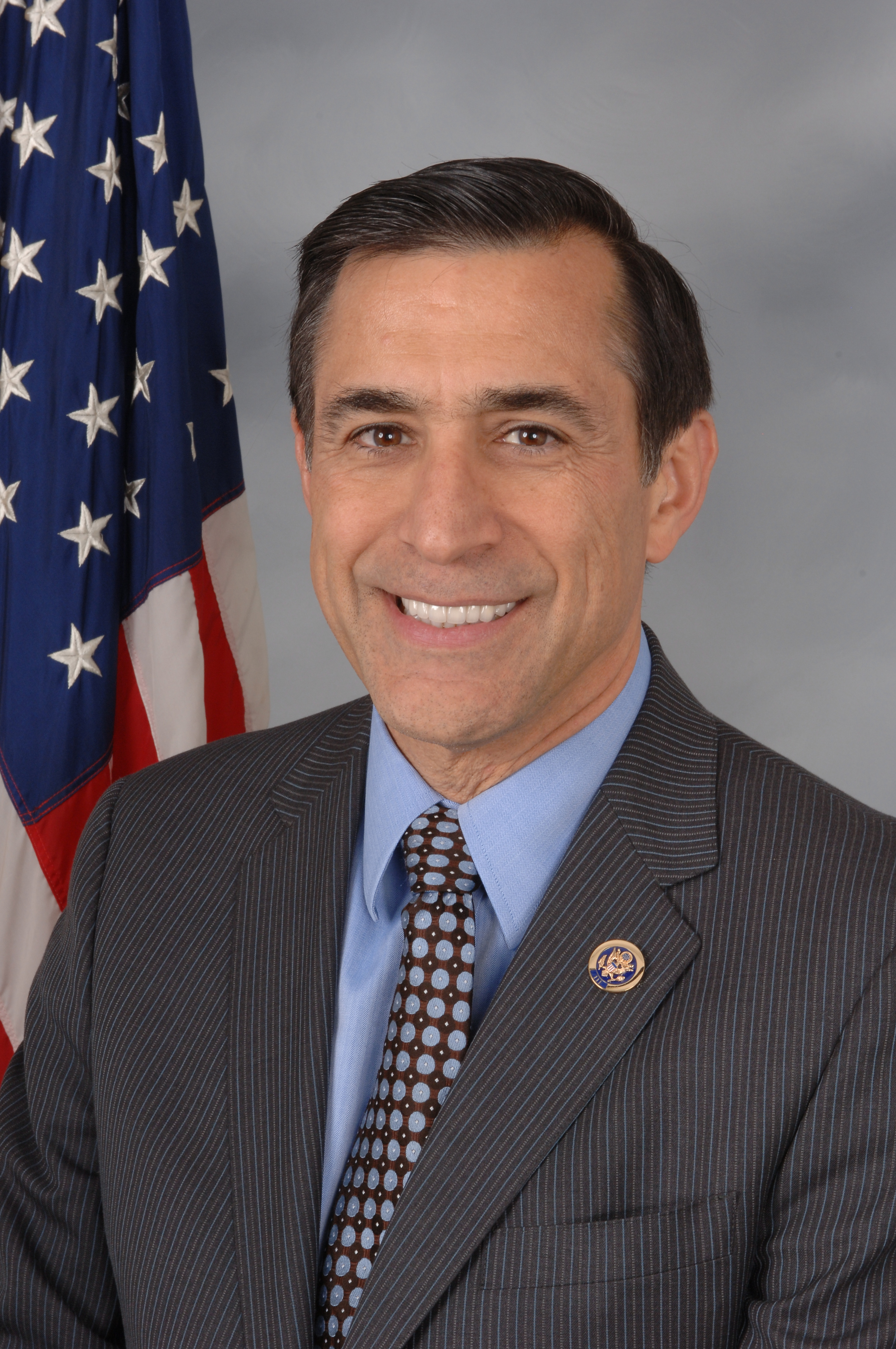
Rep. Darrell Issa, an early opponent of the SOPA bill.

1. Gary Ackerman (D-NY)
2. Todd Akin (R-MO)
3. Justin Amash (R-MI)
4. Rob Andrews (D-NJ)
5. Michele Bachmann (R-MN)
6. Spencer Bachus (R-AL)
7. Dan Benishek (R-MI)
8. Judy Biggert (R-IL)
9. Timothy Bishop (D-NY), 1/18/12
10. Earl Blumenauer (D-OR)
11. Bruce Braley (D-IA)
12. Paul Broun (R-GA)
13. John Campbell (R-CA)
14. Jason Chaffetz (R-UT)
15. Yvette Clarke (D-NY)
16. Mike Coffman (R-CO)
17. Gerald Connolly (D-VA)
18. Joe Courtney (D-CT)
19. Chip Cravaack (R-MN)
20. Peter DeFazio (D-OR)
21. Norman Dicks (D-WA)
22. Lloyd Doggett (D-TX)
23. Mike Doyle (D-PA)
24. Jeffrey Duncan (R-CA)
25. Keith Ellison (D-MN)
26. Anna Eshoo (D-CA)
27. Blake Farenthold (R-TX)
28. Jeff Flake (R-AZ)
29. Jeff Fortenberry (R-NE)
30. Chris Gibson (R-NY)·
31. Paul Gosar (R-AZ)
32. Tom Graves (R-GA)
33. Tim Griffin (R-AR)
34. Raúl Grijalva (D-AZ)
35. Richard Hanna (R-NY)
36. Martin Heinrich (D-NM)
37. Brian Higgins (D-NY)
38. Kathy Hochul (D-NY)
39. Tim Holden (D-PA)
40. Rush Holt (D-NJ)
41. Michael Honda (D-CA)
42. Tim Huelskamp (R-KS)
43. Darrell Issa (R-CA)
44. Timothy Johnson (R-IL)
45. Walter Jones (R-NC)
46. John Kline (R-MN)
47. Jim Langevin (D-RI)
48. Rick Larsen (D-WA)
49. Tom Latham (R-IA)
50. Zoe Lofgren (D-CA)
51. Nita Lowey (D-NY)
52. Connie Mack (R-FL)
53. Donald Manzullo (R-IL)
54. Kenny Marchant (R-TX)
55. Jim Matheson (D-UT)
56. Doris Matsui (D-CA)
57. Thaddeus McCotter (R-MI)
58. Jim McDermott (D-WA)
59. Patrick McHenry (R-NC)
60. Jerry McNerney (D-CA)
61. Michael Michaud (D-ME)
62. George Miller (D-CA)
63. Candice Miller (R-MI)
64. Brad Miller (D-NC)
65. James Moran (D-VA)
66. Richard Nugent (R-FL)
67. Bill Pascrell (D-NJ)
68. Ron Paul (R-TX)
69. Nancy Pelosi (D-CA)
70. Tom Petri (R-WI)
71. Erik Paulsen (R-MN)
72. Chellie Pingree (D-ME)
73. Joe Pitts (R-PA)
74. Todd Platts (R-PA)
75. Jared Polis (D-CO)
76. David Price (D-NC)
77. Ben Quayle (R-AZ)
78. Todd Rokita (R-IN)
79. Paul Ryan (R-WI), 1/9/12
80. Steve Scalise (R-LA)
81. Jan Schakowsky (D-IL)
82. Aaron Schock (R-IL)
83. Kurt Schrader (D-OR)
84. Tim Scott (R-SC)
85. Jim Sensenbrenner (R-WI)
86. José Serrano (D-NY)
87. Louise Slaughter (D-NY)
88. Adam Smith (D-WA)
89. Steve Southerland (R-FL)
90. Jackie Speier (D-CA)
91. Pete Stark (D-CA)
92. Lee Terry (R-NE)
93. Mike Thompson (D-CA)
94. William Thornberry (R-TX)
95. Paul Tonko (D-NY)
96. Niki Tsongas (D-MA)
97. Mike Turner (R-OH)
98. Joe Walsh (R-IL)
99. Tim Walz (D-MN)
100. Lynn Westmoreland (R-GA)
101. Kevin Yoder (R-KS)

==== Former SOPA supporters ====
- Benjamin Quayle (R-AZ) (withdrew Jan 18)
- Dennis A. Ross (R-FL) (withdrew Jan 18)
- Lee Terry (R-NE) (withdrew Jan 18)

=== Senators opposed to SOPA/PIPA ===
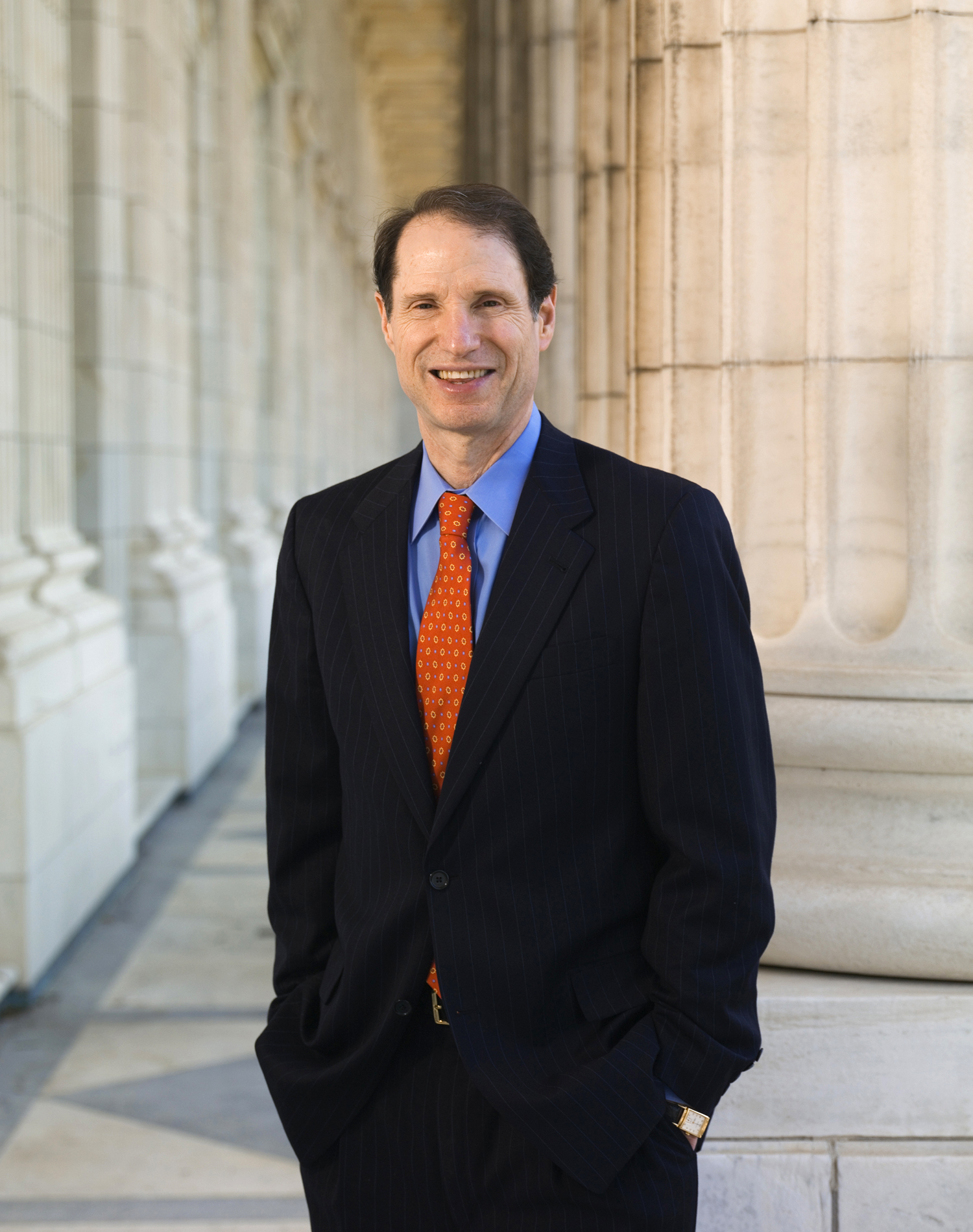
Senator Ron Wyden (D-OR) was one of the earliest opponents in the Senate.

Sen. Ron Wyden was one of the opposition leaders against PIPA. On November 28, 2011, Wyden issued a filibuster threat with Sen. Jerry Moran if SOPA/PIPA made it to the floor. A January 20, 2012, editorial in the Daily Kos described Wyden as "The biggest SOPA/PIPA hero". After Senator Wyden, Senator Moran was one of the first Senators to recognize the problems with PIPA and to take a stand against the bill Massachusetts Senator Scott Brown (R) also publicly voiced his opposition to the legislation as well as its sister bill in the House, SOPA.

Opposition

- Ron Wyden (D-OR)
- Bernie Sanders (I-VT)
- Rand Paul (R-KY)
- Mark Warner (D-VA)
- Kelly Ayotte (R-NH)
- Mark Begich (D-AK)
- John Boozman (R-AR) Jan 18
- Scott Brown (R-MA)
- Maria Cantwell (D-WA)
- Tom Coburn (R-OK) Jan 18
- John Cornyn (R-TX)
- Jim DeMint (R-SC) Jan 18
- James Inhofe (R-OK)
- Mike Johanns (R-NE)
- Ron Johnson (R-WI)
- Mark Kirk (R-IL)
- Mike Lee (R-UT)
- Jeff Merkley (D-OR) Jan 18
- Lisa Murkowski (R-AK)
- Marco Rubio (R-FL)
- Olympia Snowe (R-ME)
- Pat Toomey (R-PA)

==== Former PIPA supporters ====
- Jerry Moran (R-KS) Withdrawn: 6/27/11
- Kelly Ayotte (R-NH) Withdrawn 1/18/12
- Roy Blunt (R-MO) Withdrawn 1/18/12
- Ben Cardin (D-MD) Withdrawn 1/18/12
- Orrin Hatch (R-UT) Withdrawn 1/18/12
- Marco Rubio (R-FL) Withdrawn 1/18/12
- David Vitter (R-LA) Withdrawn 1/18/12
- Chuck Grassley (R-IA) Withdrawn 1/18/12

== Legislative narrative ==
=== Senate Judiciary Committee ===
In May 2011, the Senate Judiciary Committee unanimously voted to report in favor of PIPA.

- Patrick Leahy
- Herb Kohl
- Dianne Feinstein
- Chuck Schumer
- Richard Durbin
- Sheldon Whitehouse
- Amy Klobuchar
- Al Franken
- Chris Coons
- Richard Blumenthal
- Chuck Grassley
- Orrin Hatch
- Jon Kyl
- Jeff Sessions
- Lindsey Graham
- John Cornyn
- Mike Lee
- Tom Coburn

Source: 2011 Congressional Record, Vol. 157, Page S557

However, Senator Ron Wyden (D-OR) placed a "Senate hold" on the bill, postponing it from going to a full floor vote.

=== U.S. Senate ===
On January 13, six Republican co-sponsors of the bill released a letter of concern, reading in part:

"We have increasingly heard from a large number of constituents and other stakeholders with vocal concerns about possible unintended consequences of the proposed legislation, including breaches in cybersecurity, damaging the integrity of the Internet, costly and burdensome litigation, and dilution of First Amendment rights."

On January 17, Senator Ron Wyden announced his intention to filibuster PIPA if necessary.

January 18 saw the Internet Blackout protests in which websites coordinated to oppose SOPA/PIPA. In the wake of online protests, Senate Majority Leader Harry Reid announced that the PIPA vote previously scheduled for January 24 would be postponed.

=== SOPA in the House of Representatives ===
Representative Lamar S. Smith introduced SOPA. Smith remarked of the bill:

"The Stop Online Piracy Act helps American innovators by protecting U.S. intellectual property from foreign criminals."

=== Legislative timeline ===
- May 12, 2011 – PIPA introduced to Senate
- May 26, 2011 – Senate Judiciary Committee unanimously votes to report in favor of PIPA
- Oct 26, 2011 – SOPA introduced to House
- Nov 16, 2011 – House Judiciary Committee hearing on SOPA
- Dec 15, 2011 – House markup on SOPA
- Jan 13, 2012 – Six PIPA Co-sponsors write letter of concern
- Jan 14, 2012 – White House issues formal response to SOPA/PIPA petition
- Jan 18, 2012 – Internet Blackout protest; 6 Senators withdraw support: Kelly Ayotte, John Boozman, Roy Blunt, Orrin Hatch, Mark Kirk, Marco Rubio. Two Representatives withdraw support: Benjamin Quayle, Lee Terry
- Jan 20, 2012 – Senate Majority Leader Reid announces vote on PIPA will be postponed
- Jan 24, 2012 – Senate vote on PIPA which was scheduled for this date has been postponed

== See also ==
- List of organizations with official stances on the Stop Online Piracy Act
