= Protests against SOPA and PIPA =

Series of protests from 2011 to 2012

- Part of Internet censorship in the United States
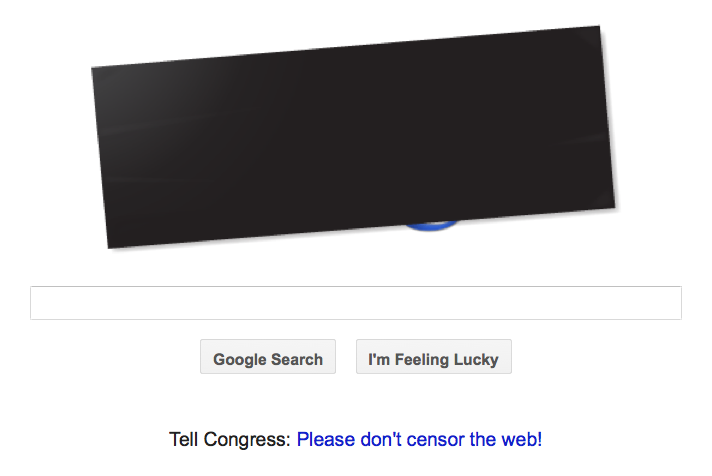
- An online protest by Google. On January 18, 2012, as a Google Doodle, Google placed a censor bar over their logo (the 2010–2013 logo), which when clicked took visitors to pages with information about SOPA and PIPA.
- Date: November 16, 2011 – January 18, 2012 (2 months and 2 days); Main phase: January 18, 2012
- Goals: Defeat of proposed SOPA and PIPA legislation
- Methods: Online protests, physical demonstrations in various cities and locales
- Result: SOPA and PIPA withdrawn from legislature; bills effectively defeated

Lead figures
| Fight for the Future (organizer); Notable websites and groups protesting: Anonymous; Boing Boing; Cheezburger; Craigslist; Flickr; Google; Internet Archive; Mojang; Roblox Corporation; Mozilla; Reddit; Techdirt; Tumblr; Twitter; Wikipedia; WordPress; xkcd | United States government; Major bill supporters: Motion Picture Association of America; Recording Industry Association of America; Entertainment Software Association |

On January 18, 2012, a series of coordinated protests occurred against two proposed laws in the United States Congress—the Stop Online Piracy Act (SOPA) and the PROTECT IP Act (PIPA). These followed smaller protests in late 2011. Protests were based on concerns that the bills, intended to provide more robust responses to copyright infringement (also known as piracy) arising outside the United States, contained measures that could possibly infringe online freedom of speech, websites, and Internet communities. Protesters also argued that there were insufficient safeguards in place to protect sites based upon user-generated content.

The move to a formal protest was initiated when Fight for the Future organized thousands of the most popular websites in the world, including the English Wikipedia, to temporarily close or interrupt their content and redirect users to a message opposing the proposed legislation. Websites such as Google, Reddit, Mozilla, and Flickr soon featured protests against the acts. Some shut down completely, while others kept some or all of their content accessible. According to Fight for the Future, more than 115,000 websites joined the Internet protest. In addition to the online protests, there were simultaneous physical demonstrations in several U.S. cities, including New York City, San Francisco and Seattle, and separately during December 2011 a mass boycott of then-supporter GoDaddy. The protests were reported globally.

The January protest, initially planned to coincide with the first SOPA hearing of the year, drew publicity and reaction. Days prior to the action, the White House issued a statement that it would "not support legislation that reduces freedom of expression, increases cybersecurity risk, or undermines the dynamic, innovative global Internet". On January 18, 2012, itself, more than 8 million people looked up their representative on Wikipedia, 3 million people emailed Congress to express opposition to the bills, more than 1 million messages were sent to Congress through the Electronic Frontier Foundation, an online petition at Google recorded over 4.5 million signatures, Twitter recorded at least 2.4 million SOPA-related tweets, and lawmakers collected "more than 14 million names—more than 10 million of them voters—who contacted them to protest" the bills.

During and after the January protest, a number of politicians who had previously supported the bills expressed concerns with the proposals in their existing form, while others withdrew their support entirely. Internationally, "scathing" criticism of the bills was voiced from World Wide Web inventor Tim Berners-Lee, as well as the European Commissioner for Digital and Frontier Technologies. Some observers were critical of the tactics used; the Boston Herald described the service withdrawals as evidence of "how very powerful these cyber-bullies can be". Motion Picture Association Chairman Chris Dodd stated that the coordinated shutdown was "an abuse of power given the freedoms these companies enjoy in the marketplace today". Others such as The New York Times saw the protests as "a political coming of age for the tech industry".

By January 20, 2012, the political environment regarding both bills had shifted significantly. The bills were removed from further voting, ostensibly to be revised to take into consideration the issues raised, but according to The New York Times, it was probably "shelved" following a "flight away from the bill". Opponents of the bills noted that they had been "indefinitely postponed" but cautioned that they were "not dead" and "[would] return".

== Background ==
=== Background to bills ===
The Stop Online Piracy Act (SOPA) and the PROTECT IP Act (PIPA) are bills that were introduced into the United States House of Representatives and the United States Senate in the last quarter of 2011. Both are responses to the problem of enforcement of U.S. laws against websites outside U.S. jurisdiction. While the Digital Millennium Copyright Act and other existing laws have generally been considered effective against illegal content or activities on U.S.-based sites, action is more difficult against overseas websites. SOPA and PIPA proposed to rectify this by cutting off infringing sites from their U.S.-based funding (particularly advertising), payment processors, appearances on search engines, and visibility on web browsers, instead. Major providers of all these services are predominantly U.S.-based. Notably, the provisions also involved modifying the Domain Name System, a crucial service that underpins the entire Internet and allows computers to locate each other reliably around the world.

Supporters included, but were not limited to, media companies and industry associations such as the Motion Picture Association, the Recording Industry Association of America and the Entertainment Software Association. Supporters generally identified a need to have more effective laws to combat the illegal domestic sales of products and services, the counterfeiting and sale of products (such as prescription drugs, athletic shoes, and cosmetics), and worldwide copyright infringing activities which were problematic to prevent inasmuch as they originated outside the United States.

Those opposed included a mixture of technology and Internet firms and associations, content creators such as the Wikipedia community, free software authors, free speech organizations, lawmakers, and other websites and organizations, as well as members of the public using their services. They generally identified two main areas of severe side-effects: (1) effects on Internet websites, communities and user-generated content, and (2) effects on critically fundamental internet architecture and security:

- Effects on websites, web communities and user-generated content – The scope, language, definitions, procedures, remedies, and provision for immunity following wrongful allegations was seen as insufficiently narrow and well-defined. Legal analysts suggested that draconian court orders could be obtained without undue difficulty to "take down" an entire site, without dialog or notification, due process, or liability for compensation if incorrect, even if the site were legitimate. Perceived consequences included serious undermining of free speech on the Internet, devastation of the Internet's communities, and widespread closure and chilling of websites, particularly those including user-created content or organizations such as libraries providing reference information. Observers also noted the laws could be used strategically against legitimate competitors or during elections.
- Effects on critical Internet architecture – Technical experts testified that the proposed DNS measures conflicted with the fundamental basis of the Internet and would "break" ongoing attempts to make the net more secure against malicious use.

Google's policy director, Bob Boorstin, stated that a site like YouTube supporting user-generated content "would just go dark immediately" to comply with the legislation. Tumblr, one of the first websites active in grassroots activism against the bills, added a feature that "censored" its website on November 16, 2011, and the social media aggregator Reddit also became deeply involved.

=== Legislative and protest timeline ===
On November 16, 2011, a first hearing by the U.S. House Judiciary Committee was marked by online protests involving blackened website banners, popularly described as "American Censorship Day".

On December 15, 2011, the first House Judiciary Committee mark-up hearing took place for SOPA, prior to its eventual move to the House floor. During the markup session, several proposed amendments to address technological and other concerns were defeated. The mark-up process was put on hold to be resumed after the new year.

Around this time, numerous websites began displaying banners and messages promoting their readerships to contact Congress to stop the progress of the bill, and some websites began to discuss or endorse a possible "Internet blackout" before any vote on SOPA in the House, as a means of further protest. Reddit was the first major site to announce an "Internet blackout" for January 18, 2012, and several other sites shortly followed, coordinating actions for that day.

A notable political response to the November 2011 protests was the outlining in early December of a bipartisan third, alternative, bill with the support of technology companies such as Google and Facebook, which unusually had been posted on the Internet to allow public comment and suggestions in light of the widespread protests related to the SOPA and PIPA bills. It was formally introduced as the Online Protection and Enforcement of Digital Trade Act in the Senate on December 17 by Senator Ron Wyden, and, in the House on January 18, by Representative Darrell Issa. It proposed placing enforcement in the hands of the United States International Trade Commission, keeping provisions that targeted payments and advertising for infringing websites, and tightly targeted wording to avoid many other key areas of concern with SOPA and PIPA.

Online discussions of a blackout and concerns over the bills continued unabated after the markup hearing and increased in prominence. On January 11, 2012, Senator Patrick Leahy, the main sponsor for PIPA, said of the DNS filtering provision, "I will therefore propose that the positive and negative effects of this provision be studied before implemented", reported by some papers as removal of those provisions. Opposers deemed this a tactical withdrawal allowing reintroduction at a later stage and ignoring other concerns as well as provisions in PIPA, and evidence that the bill had not been understood or checked by its own creators and that proposals for a blackout were gaining impact. Momentum for the protests continued unchanged since the bills had merely been postponed, and due to their other contentious provisions.

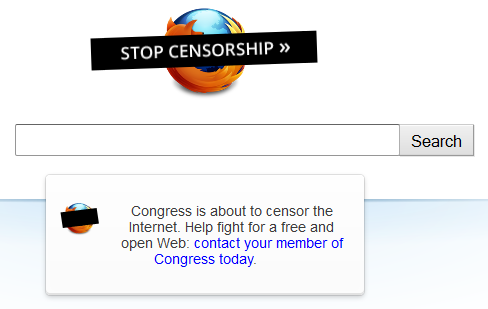
Mozilla's SOPA protest, displayed here in Firefox, used censor bars as an ironic graphic device.

== Protests of November 16, 2011 ("American Censorship Day") ==
On November 16, 2011, SOPA was discussed by the U.S. House Committee on the Judiciary. Tumblr, Mozilla, Techdirt, and the Center for Democracy and Technology were among many Internet companies who protested by participating in "American Censorship Day", by displaying black banners over their site logos with the words "Stop Censorship" in all caps.

== December 2011 boycott of GoDaddy ==
On December 22, 2011, users at Reddit proposed a boycott and a public day for switching away from then–SOPA supporter GoDaddy, the largest ICANN-accredited registrar in the world, known as Move Your Domain Day. The date was later set as December 29, 2011.

Popular websites that moved domains included Imgur, the Wikimedia Foundation, and I Can Has Cheezburger?—which stated it would remove over 1,000 domains from GoDaddy if they continued their support of SOPA.

On December 23, 2011, GoDaddy withdrew its support for SOPA, releasing a statement saying "GoDaddy will support it when and if the Internet community supports it". CEO Warren Adelman stated when asked, that he couldn't commit to changing GoDaddy's position on the record in Congress, but said "I'll take that back to our legislative guys, but I agree that's an important step", when pressed, he said "We're going to step back and let others take leadership roles". Further outrage was due to the fact that many Internet sites would be subject to shutdowns under SOPA, but GoDaddy was in a narrow class of exempted businesses that would have immunity, whereas many other domain operators would not.

On December 26, 2011, a Google bomb was started against GoDaddy to remove them from the No. 1 place on Google for the term "Domain Registration" in retaliation for supporting SOPA. This was then disseminated through Hacker News. Reddit users noted that by December 22, 2011, SOPA supporters were discovering the backlash that could arise from ignoring social media users.

Reports up to December 29, 2011, described GoDaddy as "hemorrhaging" customers. On December 25, 2011, (Christmas Day) GoDaddy lost a net 16,191 domains as a result of the boycott. However, on December 29, 2011, itself, GoDaddy gained a net of 20,748 domains, twice as many as it lost that day, attributed by Techdirt to a number of causes, in particular customers having moved early, and an appeased customer response to their change of position over SOPA.

== Protests of January 18, 2012 ==
=== Protestors ===
==== Wikimedia community ====
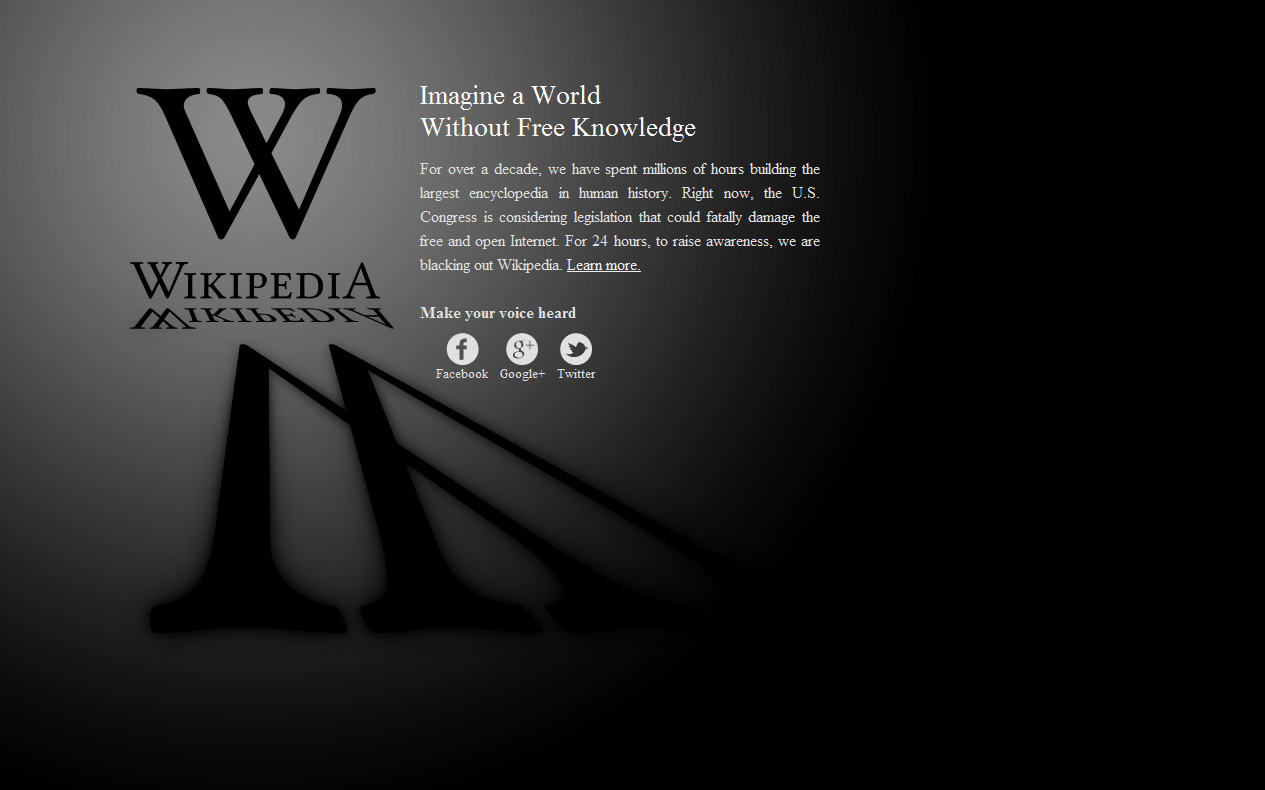
A screenshot of the English Wikipedia landing page, symbolically its only page during the blackout on January 18, 2012

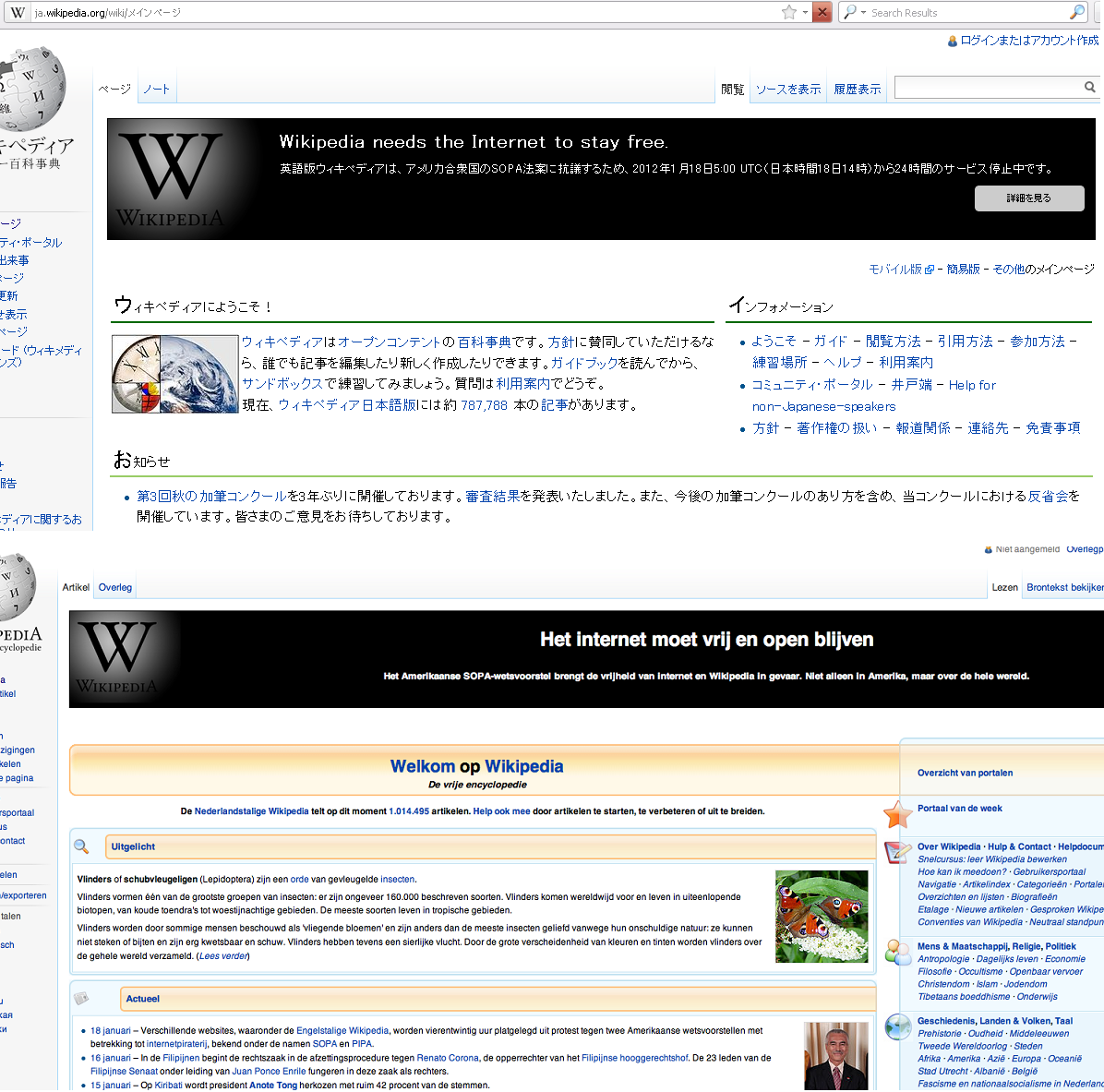
Main pages of the Japanese Wikipedia and the Dutch Wikipedia on January 18, expressing support for the English Wikipedia protest

The staff at the Wikimedia Foundation the moment the blackout happened

On December 10, 2011, Wikipedia co-founder Jimmy Wales drew attention to concerns over SOPA, which he described as a "much worse law" than the DDL intercettazioni (Wiretapping Bill) in Italy some months earlier, and which was being fast-tracked through the United States Congress under a "misleading title". He stated he was attending high-level meetings on this, and wanted to gauge the sense of the English Wikipedia community on the issue, and specifically on the question of a blackout similar to that held successfully in October 2011 by Italian Wikipedia editors over the proposed media censorship law in that country:

I thought this would be a good time to take a quick reading of the community feeling on this issue. To be clear, this is NOT a vote on whether or not to have a strike. This is merely a straw poll to indicate overall interest. If this poll is firmly "opposed" then I'll know that now. But even if this poll is firmly in "support" we'd obviously go through a much longer process to get some kind of consensus around parameters, triggers, and timing.

Following initial informal discussions which resulted in a positive response, a formal consultation titled "SOPA Initiative" was opened by the community to consider specific proposals and preferred options. These included matters such as location (United States only or worldwide), and whether content should be disabled completely or still accessible after a click-through page. Eventually, the discussion led to a decision strongly in favor of a 24-hour global blackout of the site on January 18, 2012, disabling normal reading and editing functions, affirmed in a vote of approximately 1,800 editors. The blocking action was purposely not complete; users could access Wikipedia content from the mobile interface or mirror sites, or if they disabled JavaScript or other web browser functions. Within hours of the start of the blackout, many websites posted instructions for disabling the banner, by altering URLs, using browser add-ons such as Adblock Plus or Greasemonkey, or interrupting the page from loading completely.

The vote formally affected the English Wikipedia only, other language editions and Wikimedia projects were left free to decide whether to hold their own protests given the potential worldwide impact of the legislation, with technical support on offer from the Foundation.

On January 17, 2012, Jimmy Wales affirmed the results of the community's decision and that the Wikimedia Foundation, which hosts the English Wikipedia website, would support the community's decision. He called for a "public uprising" against the proposed legislation, which critics feared would threaten free speech. He added that factors such as funding or donations had not been part of the community's considerations, but the matter had arisen as "a principled stand" from the community, and that in his view "our best long-term prospect for Wikipedia in terms of our survival... depends on us being principled". He commented on editors' reasons for the decision:

Free speech includes the right to not speak. We are a community of volunteers. We have written this thing that we believe to be a gift to the world. We don't charge people for it. It's freely available to anybody who wants to (use it). We are a charity. And I think it's important for people to realize that the ability of our community to come together and give this kind of gift to the world depends on a certain legal infrastructure that makes it possible for people to share knowledge freely -- that the First Amendment is incredibly important in terms of the creation of this kind of thing.

Wikimedia Executive Director Sue Gardner posted an announcement of the Foundation's support for the blackout proposal on Wikimedia's blog. The post received over 7000 responses from the general public within the first 24 hours of its posting. The blackout was to run for 24 hours starting at 05:00 UTC (midnight Eastern Standard Time) on January 18, 2012.

Despite the support of those polled for the action, a small number of Wikipedia editors blacked out their own user profile pages or resigned their administrative positions in protest of the blackout; one editor stated his "main concern is that it puts the organization in the role of advocacy, and that's a slippery slope".

Approximately 90% out of the 2097 editors who took part in the votes supported joining the blackout action. It is estimated that only less than half the voters were from the United States, which suggests that Wikipedia acted as a platform for an international community to express its opinion. The most common rationale expressed by about a fifth of the editors was the sentiment that "SOPA was perceived as a worldwide threat". A majority of editors who opposed the participation were concerned with the perceived dissonance between Wikipedia's encyclopedic ethos, neutrality and active participation in a political issue (sentiment endorsed by about 4% of the vote participants); only 0.3% of participating editors suggested they support a tougher copyright regime.

==== Other websites ====
According to protest organizer Fight for the Future, more than 115,000 websites participated in the protest, including Google and Firefox. Websites that participated in the blackout included Craigslist, Boing Boing, A Softer World, Cake Wrecks, Cyanide & Happiness, Demand Progress, Destructoid, Entertainment Consumers Association, Free Press, Fail Blog, Newgrounds, GOOD Worldwide, GOG.com, GamesRadar+, I Can Has Cheezburger?, Internet Archive, Marxists Internet Archive, Jay Is Games, Mojang Studios, MoveOn, Mozilla, MS Paint Adventures, Rate Your Music, Reddit, Roblox, Oh No They Didn't, Tucows, blip.tv, Tumblr, TwitPic, Twitter, The Oatmeal, VGMusic.com, Wikia, WordPress, the webcomic xkcd as well as the corporate site of the Linux distribution openSUSE and the congressional websites of Silicon Valley representatives Anna Eshoo and Zoe Lofgren. Google announced their intention to join the blackout by altering their logo for U.S. visitors for the day, almost entirely obscuring it with an interactive black redaction swath. Clicking through the specially designed logo took readers to an informational page about the bills, and the opportunity to sign a petition to be sent to Congress stating their concerns.

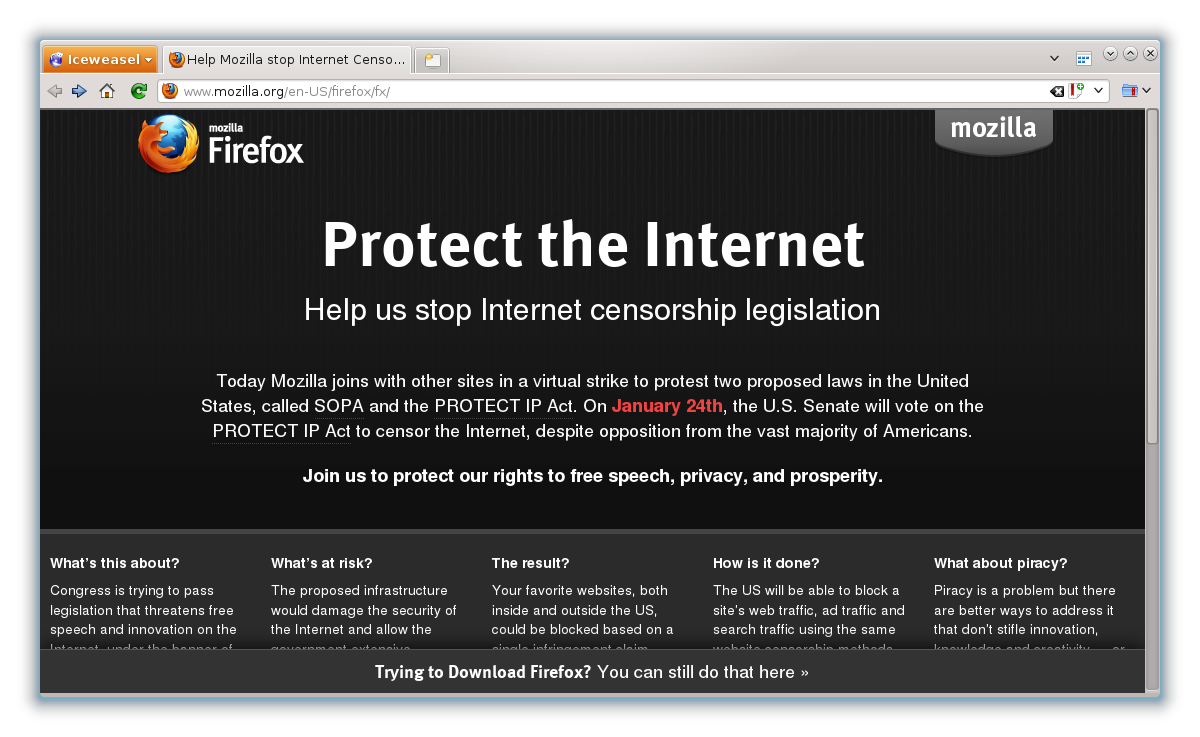
The Mozilla Foundation's default page was blacked out with links included on to how to contact one's elected representatives.

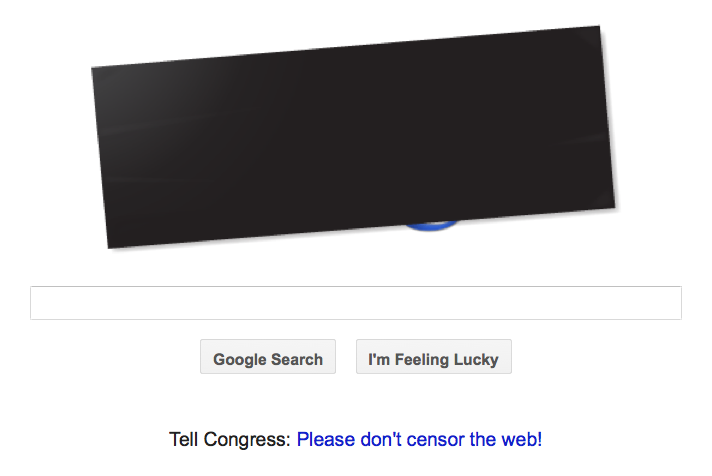
Google placed a censor bar over their normal logo, which when clicked took visitors to pages with information on SOPA and PIPA.

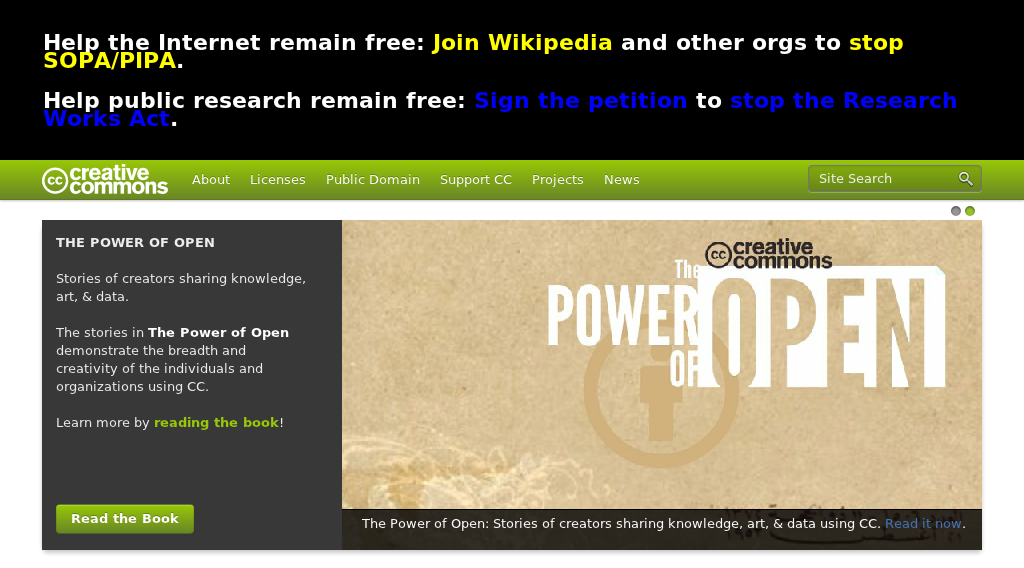
Sites like the Creative Commons provided a black banner and additional information to their visitors.

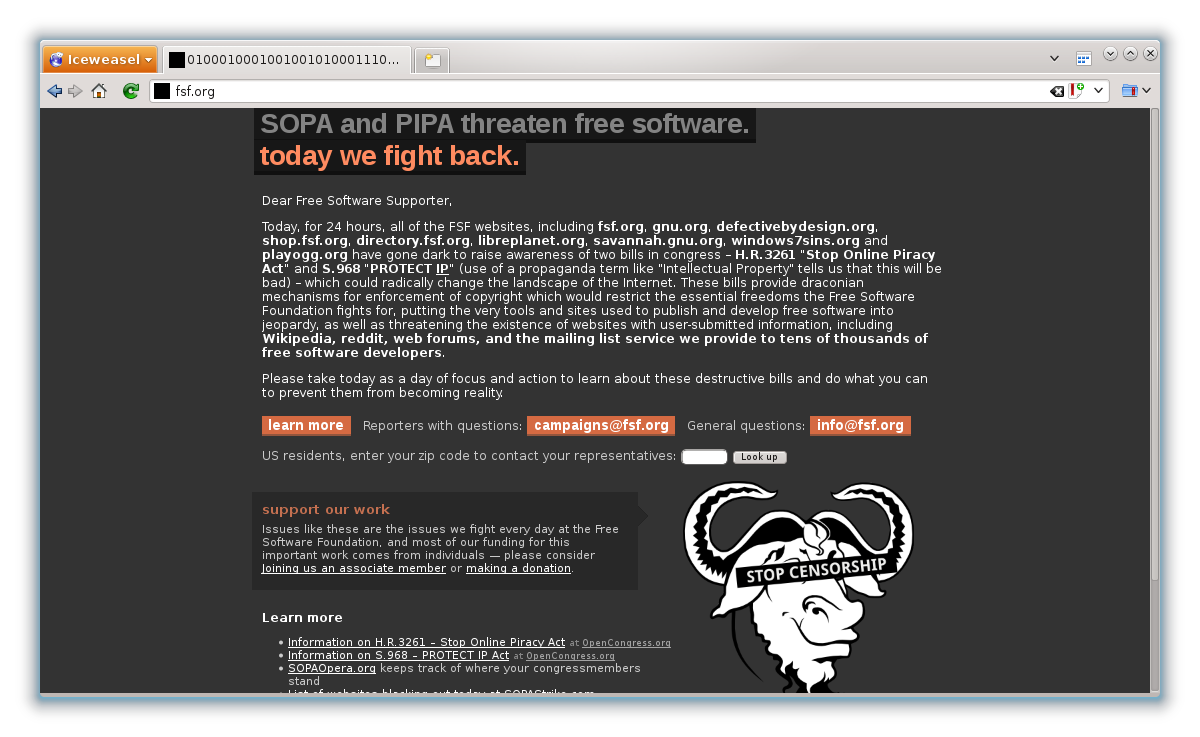
Many sites, like the Free Software Foundation, blacked out their pages and directly encouraged viewers to take action.

The Mozilla Foundation altered the default start page of their Firefox web browser, blacking it out and providing links with more information on the SOPA/PIPA bills and the opposition to them, and to allow users to email their Congressional representatives.

Mojang's bestselling game Minecraft made a splash text that said "SOPA means LOSER in Swedish!"

Wired magazine's online site used JavaScript to place black bars on most of the text on their page, as if the text were redacted. Outside of their key article regarding SOPA/PIPA, readers could remove the bars with a mouse click.

The photo-sharing website Flickr created the ability for a registered user to "censor" an unlimited number (up from an initial limit of ten) of photos. The user-selected photographs were greyed out and included informational text, as a demonstration of how SOPA/PIPA regulation would affect the site.

4chan ran a banner and "censored" posts by users on all image boards, which could be viewed by hovering over them.

A video was circulated by the League for Gamers (founded by Mark Kern and supported by ScrewAttack, Extra Credits, and LoadingReadyRun) protesting the Entertainment Software Association's support of SOPA by gathering support to boycott the ESA's popular E3 convention.

==== Physical demonstrations ====
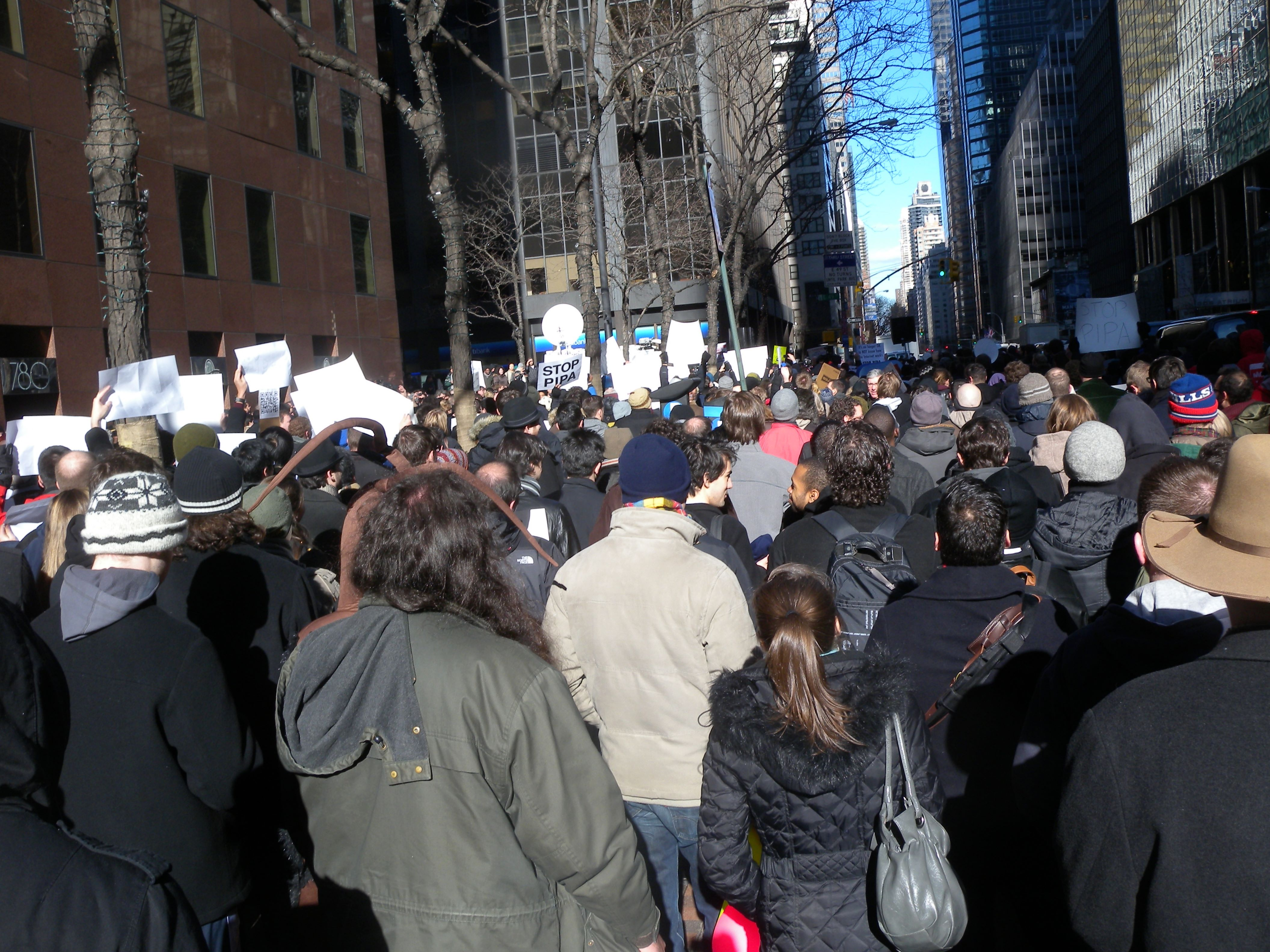
Anti-SOPA/PIPA protesters in New York City, in coordination with the Internet blackout

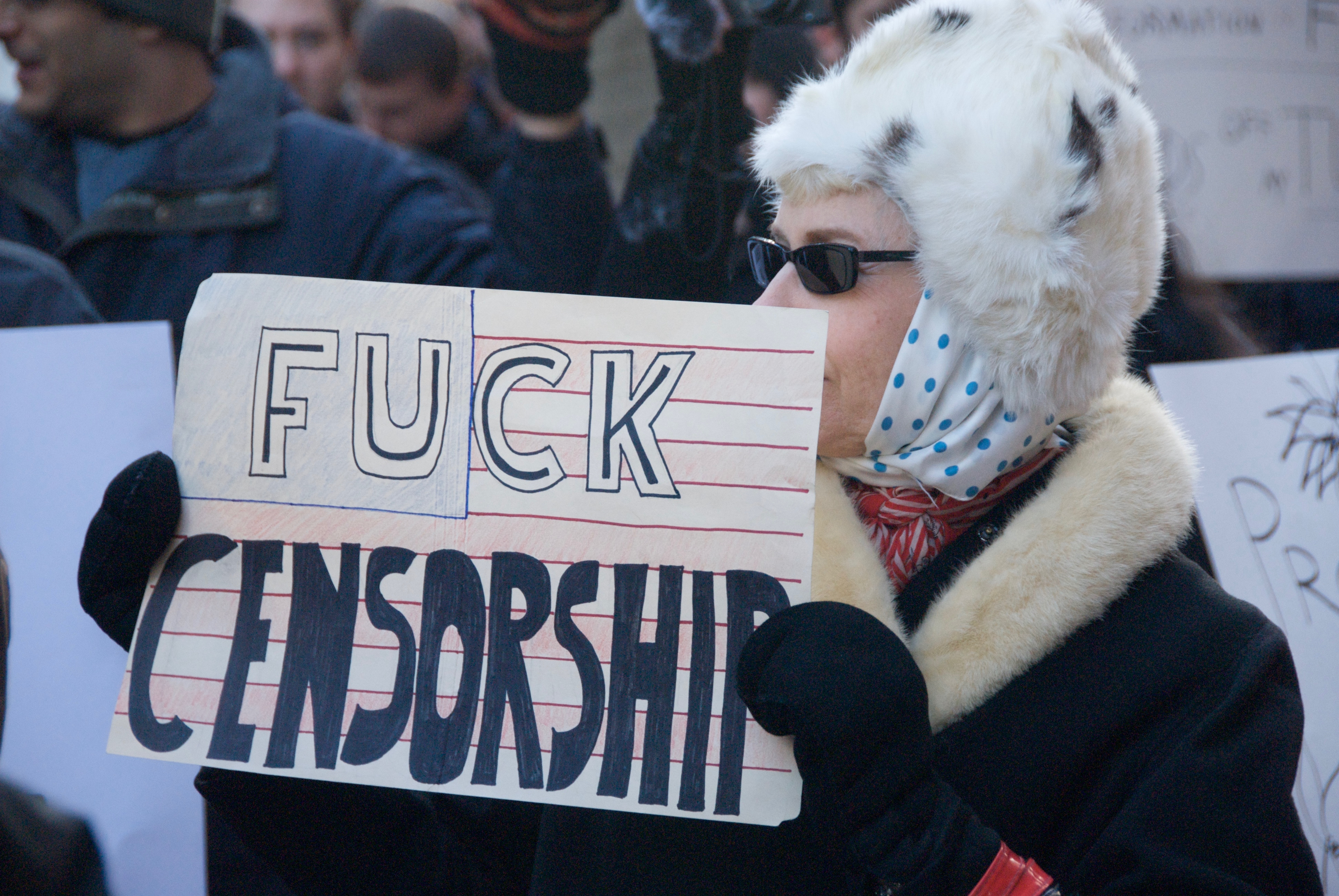
SOPA-PIPA protest, January 18, 2012, in front of Senators Chuck Schumer's and Kirsten Gillibrand's offices, New York City

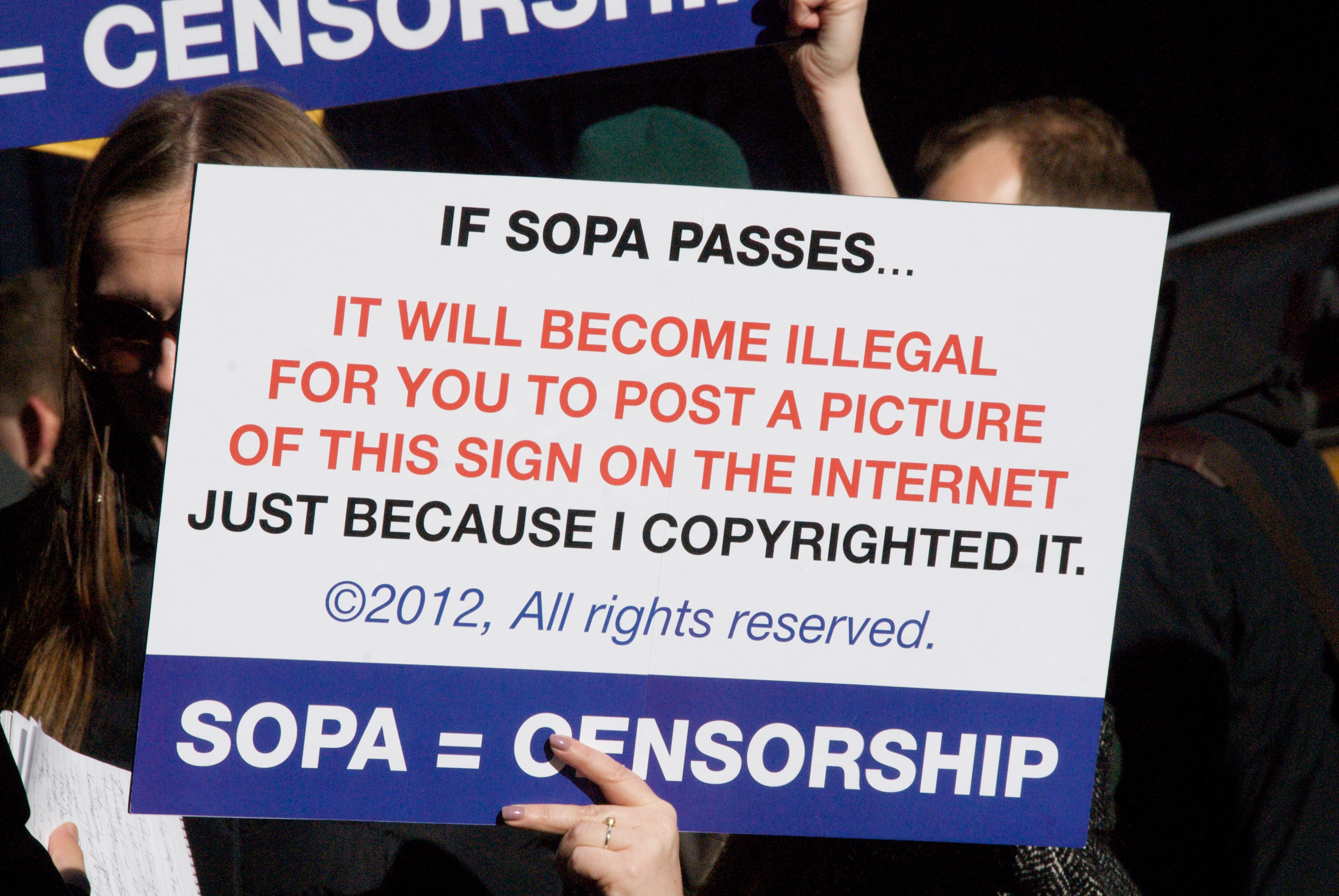
SOPA-PIPA protest, January 18, 2012, in front of Senators Chuck Schumer's and Kirsten Gillibrand's offices, New York City

In addition to the online blackouts, protests in cities such as New York City, San Francisco, and Seattle were held on January 18 to raise awareness of the two bills.

A series of pickets against the bills were held at the U.S. Embassy in Moscow. Two picketers were arrested.

=== Reaction ===
==== Pre-protest ====
The announcement of the blackout was reported worldwide. Media that covered the story included Australian Broadcasting Corporation, Canadian Broadcasting Corporation, BBC, der Spiegel, Le Figaro, Le Monde, Libération, Fox News, The Guardian, Menafn, News Corp Australia, Sky News, The Age, The Hindu, The New York Times, Taipei Times, The Washington Post, The Wall Street Journal, and The Times of India.

Several media organizations including The Washington Post, The Guardian, and NPR encouraged a "crowdsourcing solution for those left searching for answers" during the Wikipedia blackout by inviting users to ask questions on Twitter using the hashtag #altwiki.

An executive of the Motion Picture Association (MPAA) dubbed the blackout plan an example of the "gimmicks and distortion" that inflamed passions while failing to solve the problem of copyright infringement by "draw[ing] people away from trying to resolve what is a real problem, which is that foreigners continue to steal the hard work of Americans". Former U.S. Senator and MPAA Director Chris Dodd stated that the coordinated shutdown was "also an abuse of power given the freedoms these companies enjoy in the marketplace today".

Dick Costolo, CEO of social networking site Twitter, rejected calls for Twitter to join the protest, tweeting that "[c]losing a global business in reaction to single-issue national politics is foolish". Originally, some thought Costolo referred to all of the blackout movements on January 18, 2012, but he subsequently clarified that he was referring to a hypothetical blackout of Twitter and that he was supportive of the Wikipedia blackout itself.

The sponsor of the bill, Representative Lamar Smith, called the blackout a "publicity stunt," and stated with reference to Wikipedia that "it is ironic a website dedicated to providing information is spreading misinformation about the Stop Online Piracy Act".

On January 17, 2012, in response to growing concerns over PIPA and SOPA, the White House stated that it "will not support legislation that reduces freedom of expression, increases cybersecurity risk, or undermines the dynamic, innovative global Internet".

==== January 18, 2012 ====
The Wikimedia Foundation reported that there were over 162 million visits to the blacked-out version of Wikipedia during the 24-hour period, with at least 8 million uses of the site's front page to look up contact information for their U.S. Congressional representatives. The usage of Wikipedia's front page increased enormously during the blackout with 17,535,733-page views recorded, compared with 4,873,388 on the previous day. A petition created and linked to by Google recorded over 4.5 million signatures, while the Electronic Frontier Foundation reported that more than 1 million email messages were sent to congressmen through their site during the blackout. MSNBC reported that over 2.4 million Twitter messages about SOPA, PIPA, and the blackouts were made during a 16-hour period on January 18, 2012, by Twitter users, including Facebook founder Mark Zuckerberg, who had not used the service since 2009, to encourage his followers to contact their congressmen. Ron Wyden, a key opponent of the bills, said that "lawmakers had collected more than 14 million names — more than 10 million of them voters" to protest the legislation.

Time reported that before the day had ended, "the political dominoes began to fall... then trickle turned into flood". It named ten senators who had announced their switch to opposing the bills and stated that "nearly twice that many House members" had done so.

During the blackout, libraries at several universities used the outage to remind students that the traditional paper encyclopedias were available for research. Students who grew up turning to the internet to look up information were encouraged to visit the library as an alternative source of information. On Twitter, a joke hashtag #factswithoutWikipedia trended with users posting humorous fake "facts". "Startled" Internet users frustrated or angry at their loss of Wikipedia for the day used Twitter as an outlet; politicians likewise turned to Twitter when overwhelmed by the public communications flood in support of the blackout. CTV News in Canada published a "survival guide" for "getting around the blackout" on their national website, citing Wikipedia as the answer to "burning questions such as "Are chinchillas rodents?" and "What does 'rickrolling' mean?" The guide provided detailed instructions on how to circumvent the ban and access the English Wikipedia during the protest. CTV referred to the protest as "a date that will live in ignorance". CreativeFuture, a coalition representing movie studios, entertainment unions, and television networks, used the blackout to prompt those affected by it to enjoy other forms of entertainment in place of their normal Internet activities; such ads appeared at Times Square in New York City and on various websites.

==== Post-protest ====
Erik Möller of the Wikimedia Foundation talking about the Blackout at the opening of the San Francisco Wikipedia Hackathon (two days after the blackout)

The impact of the coordinated action was generally considered to be significant. Yochai Benkler of the Berkman Klein Center for Internet & Society stated that the January 18 blackout was "a very strong public demonstration to suggest that what historically was seen as a technical system of rules that only influences the content industry has become something more," further adding "You've got millions of citizens who care enough to act. That's not trivial." California House member Darrell Issa called the collective effort an unprecedented means for upsetting a backroom lobbying effort, and the immediate political efficacy of the widespread online protest was characterised in terms of a sleeping giant having awakened and of a new player being in town. One Silicon Valley lobbyist said the content industry had "a lot to learn", noting that they don't have grassroots support: "There are no Facebook pages to call your congressman to support PIPA and SOPA." The New York Times, which framed the netizens' revolt in terms of the new economy versus the old economy, headlined the activism as a "political coming of age for the tech industry". James Grimmelmann, an associate professor at New York Law School, opined two months later that "Legal systems are like Soylent Green: they're made out of people. If you want to protect civil liberties using law, you need to get people on your side who share your vision of what law stands for. That's why the SOPA protests were so effective. They converted an argument about justice into real-world political power."

Newspaper editorials had mixed views. The Boston Herald called the protest a "hissy fit" by "Internet powerhouses" saying, "within hours of the online protest, political supporters of the bill... began dropping like flies, thus proving how very powerful these cyber-bullies can be". The New York Times described the protest as "Noted, but as a Brief Inconvenience" and, as well, offered an opinion about the protest and possible accomplishments. BBC News technology writer Rory Cellan-Jones was of the opinion that the blackout achieved its objectives but possibly at some cost to Wikipedia's reputation. Bill Keller was of the view that "Jimmy Wales... assumed a higher profile as a combatant for the tech industry [and] supplied an aura of credibility to a libertarian alliance that ranged from the money-farming Megatrons of Google to the hacker anarchists of Anonymous."

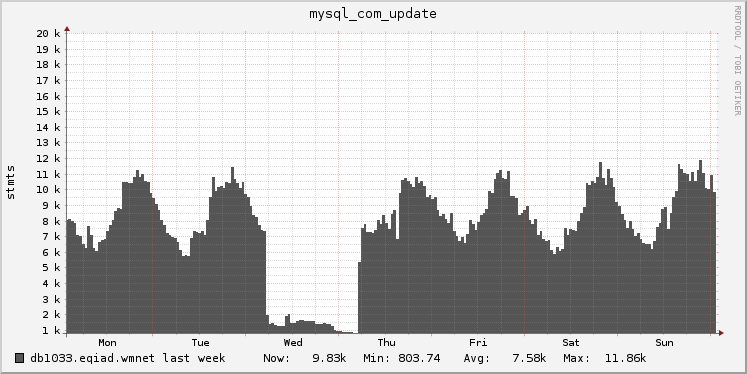
Wikipedia editing levels before, during, and after the blackout

Media columnist David Carr wrote in The New York Times that there were two lessons, one being that "People who don't understand the Web should not try to re-engineer it", and the other that while businesses generally prize their relations with their customers, in the struggle between media and technology companies, the latter have "a much more chronic [i.e. ongoing], intimate relationship with consumers" and would more than likely prevail.

Motion Picture Association chairman Chris Dodd admitted that the content industry had lost the public relations battle with the Internet industry, adding that "[y]ou've got an opponent who has the capacity to reach millions of people with a click of a mouse and there's no fact-checker. They can say whatever they want." Dodd called for Hollywood and Silicon Valley to work out a compromise on the legislation, but was also criticized for a statement on Fox News to the effect that politicians would risk having campaign funding cut off if they did not support media industry proposals. The legal director of public interest group Public Knowledge was quoted on that organization's website as writing:

Threats like that are no way to conduct the serious, sober discussions needed to figure out exactly what ails the movie industry and to come up with solutions. It was Hollywood's arrogance in pushing bills through Congress without proper vetting that caused them to be withdrawn; these threats also are not helpful to figuring out what ails the industry and how to solve their issues.

Among other media industry reactions, CreativeFuture was of the view that "[t]hey've misidentified this issue as an issue about your Internet, your Internet is being jeopardized. In fact their business model is being asked to be subjected to regulation. They're misleading their huge base." Recording Industry Association of America President Cary Sherman noted that the major television networks supported the legislation but, unlike Wikipedia and Google, did not use their platforms to try to shape public opinion: "when Wikipedia and Google purport to be neutral sources of information that is not only not neutral but affirmatively incomplete and misleading, they are duping their users into accepting as truth what are merely self-serving political declarations."

Rep. Lamar Smith, who sponsored SOPA, flatly stated in a commentary on Fox News that "This bill does not threaten the Internet. But it does threaten the profits generated by foreign criminals who target the U.S. market and willfully steal intellectual property by trafficking in counterfeit or pirated goods." While speaking on the Senate floor on January 23 Senator Leahy reiterated his objections to the protests, saying:

Websites like Wikipedia and YouTube... would not be subject to the provisions of the bill. That Wikipedia and some other websites decided to "go dark" on January 18, 2012 was their choice, self imposed and was not caused by the legislation and could not be.
It was disappointing that sites linked to descriptions of this legislation that were misleading and one-sided. The Internet should be a place for discussion, for all to be heard and for different points of view to be expressed. That is how truth emerges and democracy is served. Last week, however, many were subjected to false and incendiary charges and sloganeering designed to inflame emotions.

===== International responses =====
World Wide Web inventor Tim Berners-Lee "scathingly" attacked the SOPA and PIPA legislation. Speaking at an industry event in Florida, he praised the protests by major sites for the attention they had drawn, and described the bills as a "grave threat to the openness of the Internet" that "had to be stopped":

The laws have been put together to allow an industry body to ask the government to turn off a web site and the government can make people turn off the site without trial. There are times when that could be very powerful and damaging, like before an election and it is crossing a line and we have to protect the Internet as an open space, we have to respect it.

Two days later, Vice-President of the European Commission and European Commissioner for the Digital Agenda Neelie Kroes described the bills as "bad legislation" that would "threaten the basic foundation of the success of the web." She also said there "should be safeguarding benefits of open net." "Speeding is illegal too but you don't put speed bumps on the motorway," she said.

== Related protests ==
SOPA and PIPA protests were overlapped and followed by protests against the Anti-Counterfeiting Trade Agreement (ACTA) treaty, which would have been similar in its effects. The ACTA treaty was signed by 22 European Union Member States in Europe, and was expected to be signed before March 2012 by the remaining states of Cyprus, Estonia, Netherlands and Slovakia. It would have then gained legal force over the whole European Union. On February 11, more than 200 European cities took part in a widespread protest against ACTA. Although protests were held in Europe, the signing of ACTA was led by USA, Australia, Canada, South Korea, Japan, New Zealand, Morocco, and Singapore, which were first to sign the treaty at a ceremony on October 1, 2011, in Tokyo.

== Legislative impact and aftermath ==
During the day of January 18, six of PIPA's sponsors in the Senate, including Marco Rubio, PIPA's co-sponsor, Orrin Hatch, Kelly Ayotte, Roy Blunt, John Boozman, and Mark Kirk, stated that they would withdraw their support for the bills. Several other congressmen issued statements critical of the current versions of both bills.

By the following day, eighteen of the 100 senators, including eleven of the original sponsors of the PIPA bill, had announced that they no longer supported PIPA. By one account, the shift in stated positions on SOPA/PIPA by members of Congress had gone overnight from 80 for and 31 against to 65 for and 101 against. An initial floor vote was scheduled for January 24, prior to the Internet blackout, but following these responses, Senate Majority Leader Harry Reid announced that the vote will be postponed, urging the bill's main sponsor, Senator Patrick Leahy, to work out compromise in the bill "to forge a balance between protecting Americans' intellectual property, and maintaining openness and innovation on the Internet". Similarly, the House Judiciary Subcommittee chairman, Representative Lamar Smith, announced that further voting on SOPA would be placed on hold "until there is wider agreement on a solution". Later, an updated The New York Times news story reported that the two bills were "indefinitely shelved". House Committee on Oversight Chairman Darrell Issa commented that "This unprecedented effort has turned the tide against a backroom lobbying effort by interests that aren't used to being told 'no'", describing the events as a "responsible and transparent exercise of freedom of speech". Opposers cautioned that although "postponed," the bills were "not dead" and "would return".

Months after the protests, in July 2012, The New York Times summarized events as follows:

Wikipedia went black to protest SOPA and more than seven million people signed online petitions, many of which said the bills would "break the Internet." Congress, overwhelmed by the popular opposition, quickly backpedaled, leaving the legislation to die.

The development of the electronic grassroots campaign has been the subject of academic analysis.

== Other proposed laws ==
According to the Electronic Frontier Foundation (EFF), "SOPA and PIPA are really only the tip of the iceberg. The same forces behind these domestic U.S. laws have continued to both push for other states to pass similar domestic laws, as well as to secretly negotiate international trade agreements that would force signatory nations to conform to the same legal standards."

Examples cited by EFF include:

- The Anti-Counterfeiting Trade Agreement (ACTA), a pending international treaty signed by the United States in October 2011, is similar to SOPA. On July 4, 2012, the European Parliament declined its consent, effectively rejecting it, 478 votes to 39, and 165 abstentions.
- The Trans-Pacific Strategic Economic Partnership Agreement (TPP)
- Special 301 Reports – a United States law mandating annual global copyright and IP law reports, explicitly to protect and act in favour of US intellectual property owners against any other country's domestic or foreign policies or actions not conforming to United States' positions. Threat of action under Special 301 has been used to insert U.S. lobbyist–written legislation into other countries' laws.

Examples considered similar to SOPA/PIPA by other analyses:

- Ireland's proposed law "S.I. No. 337/2011 – European Communities (Electronic Communications Networks and Services) (Universal Service and Users' Rights) Regulations 2011" has been described by news media as "Ireland's SOPA". As a statutory instrument, no parliamentary vote is required to pass this into law.
- Russia's proposed law Duma Bill 89417–6, titled "On protection of children from information harmful to their health and development" has also been described as "Russia's SOPA": poorly defined (overly broad and unclear definitions of which sites are liable under its censorship provisions), and using a flawed blocking mechanism (the blocking of IP addresses, which can be shared by many sites).
- USA's CISPA bill (Cyber Intelligence Sharing and Protection Act), which would allow for the sharing of Internet traffic information between the U.S. government and technology and manufacturing companies, has been described as "worse than SOPA and PIPA".

== Legacy ==
In January 2022, Tiffiniy Cheng of Techdirt wrote that "The SOPA Blackout not only killed the bill in 2012, but shook Congress so profoundly that no significant copyright legislation has been introduced in the ten years since. Because the Blackout achieved so much progress against the political order in a matter of weeks, this moment in history rewrote what we collectively think is possible in the political realm; in particular among the political set, even though triumphs of this proportion remain elusive, and power is even more entrenched."

== See also ==
- Black World Wide Web protest – 1996 online activism action; the first major Internet protest
- Internet activism – Use of the internet to facilitate activism
- Italian Wikipedia § 2011 mass blanking protest
- List of organizations with official stances on SOPA and PIPA
- New Zealand Internet Blackout – 2009 New Zealand internet services protest
- Trans-Pacific Partnership § Intellectual properties

== Bibliography ==
- Musil, Steven (January 16, 2012). "Wikipedia to join Web blackout protesting SOPA". CBS News.
- Rainey, James (January 16, 2012). "Wikipedia blackout to protest SOPA progress in Congress". Los Angeles Times.
