= Edward DeMarco =

Former director of the Federal Housing and Finance Agency

Acting Director of the Federal Housing Finance Agency
- In office September 1, 2009 – January 6, 2014
- Preceded by: James B. Lockhart III
- Succeeded by: Mel Watt

Personal details
- Education: University of Notre Dame; University of Maryland, College Park

Edward Joseph DeMarco is an American government official who served as the acting director of the Federal Housing Finance Agency (FHFA), the conservator for Fannie Mae and Freddie Mac, from 2009 through 2014. According to DeMarco, FHFA's mandate from Congress is to preserve and conserve the assets of Fannie Mae and Freddie Mac. "[I]n their current state that translates directly into minimizing taxpayer losses. We are also charged with ensuring stability and liquidity in housing financing and maximizing assistance to homeowners."

== Early Career and Education ==
DeMarco received a B.A. in economics from the University of Notre Dame and a Ph.D. in economics from the University of Maryland (1991). His thesis at U. Maryland was Taxes in a model of bank portfolio choice.

DeMarco worked in the U.S. General Accounting Office for seven years (1986–1993). He then worked at the U.S. Treasury as director of the Office of Financial Institutions Policy (1993–2003) where he oversaw analyses of public policy issues involving government sponsored enterprises and other financial institutions. He then moved to the Social Security Administration (SSA) where he was the Assistant Deputy Commissioner for Policy (2003–2006). There he ran the SSA's policy, research, and statistics functions. His penultimate role before acting director of the FHFA was COO and Deputy Director Office of Federal Housing Enterprise Oversight (OFHEO) which he held for three years (October 2006-August 2009). In August 2009, President Obama promoted DeMarco to the position of acting director of Federal Housing Finance Agency.

== Criticism ==
A Change.org petition from March 2012 claims that DeMarco is "the biggest obstacle to serious economic recovery. ... He oversees 60% of the country's home loans. Regardless of expert advice to provide principal reduction to homeowners whose homes are underwater, DeMarco has personally blocked it. While DeMarco stands by, the 5 largest private banks are already agreeing to provide principal reduction to homeowners under the 50 state Attorney Generals' Settlement" DeMarco (2012) reported that Fannie Mae and Freddie Mac hold only 29 percent of the seriously delinquent loans (where the homeowner has missed at least 3 or more payments or is in foreclosure), which leaves 71 percent outside the conservatorship of FHFA: Only 3.8 percent of loans managed by Fannie Mae and Freddie Mac are seriously delinquent, while 13.5 percent of other loans are seriously delinquent. He provided further details about foreclosure prevention efforts both in and outside FHFA, noting that the FHFA re-default rates are lower than outside his purview.

Nobel economist and The New York Times columnist Paul Krugman called for DeMarco's firing in his blog on July 31, 2012. Krugman said that DeMarco had rejected a Treasury Department request to offer debt relief to homeowners, with Treasury covering 63 percent of the debt relief. Krugman said DeMarco's rejection was based on the net loss debt relief would cost taxpayers. Krugman questioned DeMarco's analysis, but also said that "deciding whether debt relief is a good policy for the nation as a whole is not DeMarco's job. His job — as long as he keeps it, which I hope is a very short period of time — is to run his agency. If the Secretary of the Treasury, acting on behalf of the president, believes that it is in the national interest to spend some taxpayer funds on debt relief, in a way that actually improves the FHFA's budget position, the agency's director has no business deciding on his own that he prefers not to act." Three days later, in The New York Times, Krugman reiterated that DeMarco's efforts, along with other Republican policy makers in the legislative branch, have stalled the economy, and called again for Obama to fire DeMarco and replace him with a recess appointment. Timothy Geithner is said to oppose DeMarco on this issue as well. DeMarco defended his position, claiming that allowing the debt relief would present a notable moral hazard, perhaps causing some homeowners to strategically allow themselves into debt to receive assistance. DeMarco was also criticized in the book by Atif Mian and Amir Sufi, the house of debt, 2014. According to the two authors, "public policies should do everything possible to support family expenses. One of these policies was ... the debt forgiveness"

Political offices
Preceded by James Lockhart	Director of the Federal Housing Finance Agency; Acting; 2009–2014	Succeeded by Mel Watt
