= Mel Watt =

American politician (born 1945)

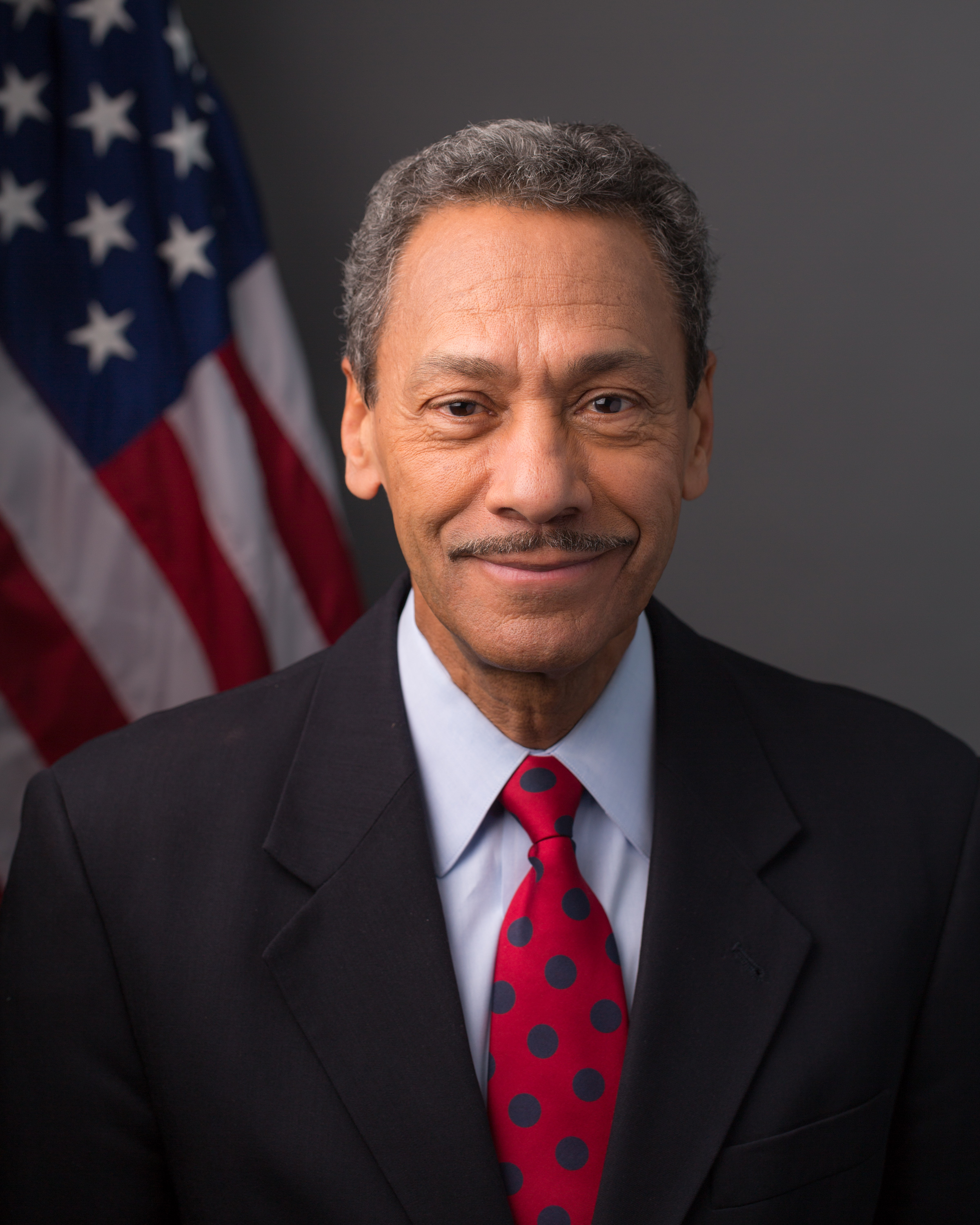
- Official portrait, 2014

Director of the Federal Housing Finance Agency
- In office January 6, 2014 – January 6, 2019
- President: Barack Obama; Donald Trump
- Preceded by: Edward DeMarco (acting)
- Succeeded by: Joseph Otting (acting)

Member of the U.S. House of Representatives from North Carolina's 12th district
- In office January 3, 1993 – January 6, 2014
- Preceded by: Constituency reestablished
- Succeeded by: Alma Adams

Member of the North Carolina Senate from the 33rd district
- In office January 1985 – January 1987
- Preceded by: Constituency established
- Succeeded by: Jim Richardson

Personal details
- Born: Melvin Luther Watt; August 26, 1945 (age 80) Steele Creek, North Carolina, U.S.
- Party: Democratic
- Spouse: Eulada Watt
- Children: 2
- Education: University of North Carolina, Chapel Hill (BS); Yale University (JD)

Melvin Luther Watt (born August 26, 1945) is an American politician who served as director of the Federal Housing Finance Agency from 2014 to 2019. He was appointed by President Barack Obama. He is a former United States representative for North Carolina's 12th congressional district, from 1993 to 2014. He is a member of the Democratic Party.

A lawyer from Charlotte, North Carolina, Watt served one term as a state senator and was the campaign manager for Charlotte mayor Harvey Gantt.

On May 1, 2013, President Barack Obama nominated Watt to lead the Federal Housing Finance Agency, which, among other agencies, administers or has oversight for the FHA, Fannie Mae, and Freddie Mac. The U.S. Senate confirmed Watt on December 10, 2013, and he resigned from the House on January 6, 2014.

On September 27, 2018, Watt was called to testify before Congress about allegations that he had sexually harassed a female employee at the Federal Housing Finance Agency. On November 29, 2018, Watt was found guilty of two counts of misconduct. He ended his term as director on January 6, 2019, and issued the following quote: "In my view, it's time for me to ride off into the sunset because the standards have become so confused that it's difficult to operate in them," he said, according to a transcript of his interview with investigators.

== Early life, education and career ==
Watt was born in Steele Creek, located in Mecklenburg County. He is the son of Evelyn Lucille (née Mauney) and Graham Edward Watt.

Watt is a graduate of York Road High School in Charlotte. He was a Phi Beta Kappa graduate of the University of North Carolina at Chapel Hill in 1967 with a B.S. degree in Business Administration. In 1970, he received a J.D. from Yale Law School and was a published member of the Yale Law Journal.

== Early career ==
Watt practiced law from 1970 to 1992, specializing in minority business and economic development law. He has been a partner in several small businesses.

Watt was the campaign manager of Harvey Gantt's campaigns for mayor of Charlotte and for the United States Senate election in North Carolina in 1990. Watt served as a member of the North Carolina Senate from January 1985 to January 1987.

== U.S. House of Representatives ==
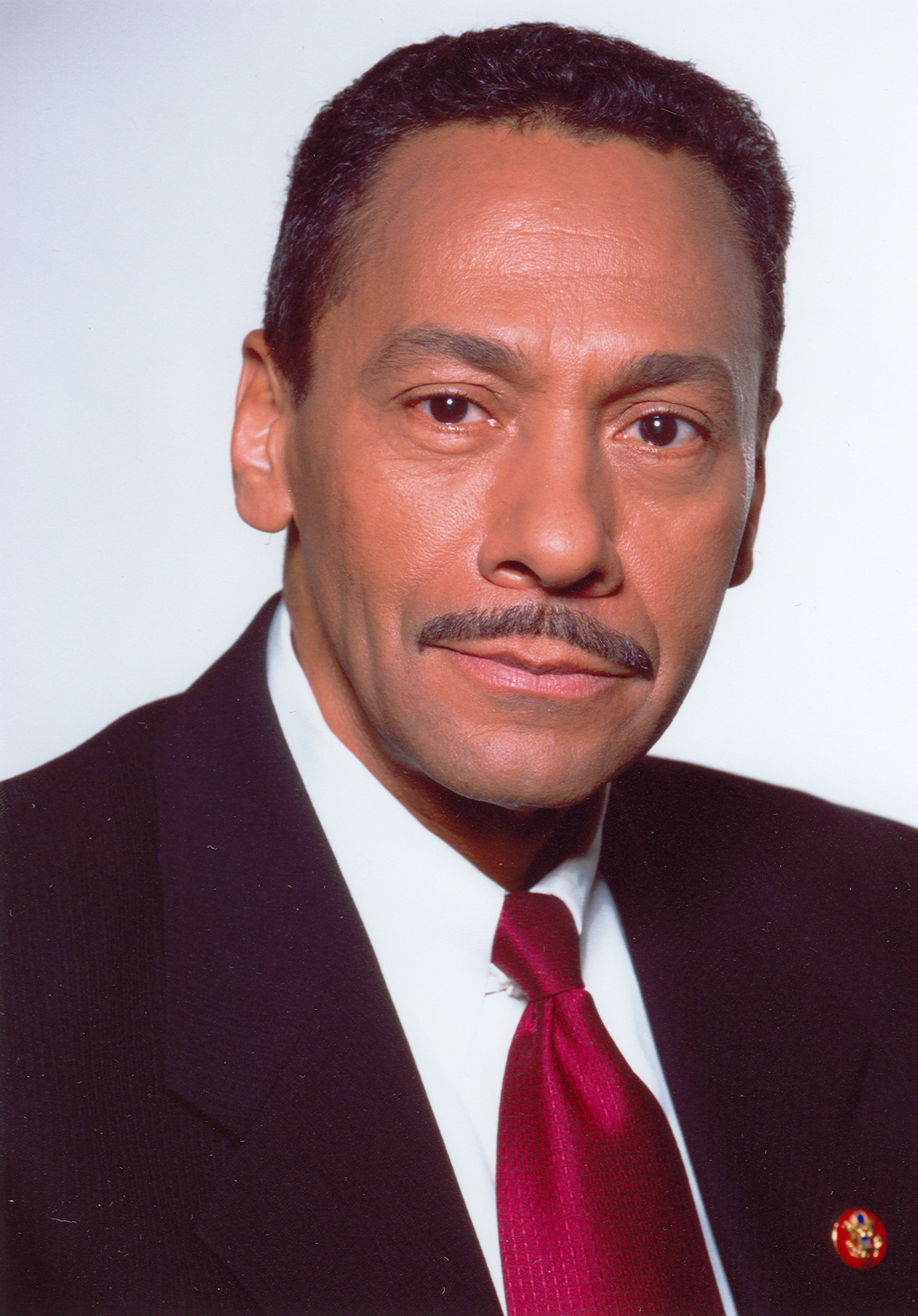
Watt's final Congressional portrait

In 1992, Watt entered the Democratic primary for the newly created 12th District, a 64 percent black-majority district stretching from Gastonia to Durham. He won the four-way Democratic primary—the real contest in this heavily Democratic district—with 47 percent of the vote. He then easily won the general election by defeating Barbara Gore Washington (R) and Curtis Wade Krumel (L) with 70 percent of the vote, becoming the first Democrat to represent a significant portion of Charlotte since 1953. In 1993, the original version of his district was thrown out in Shaw v. Reno, and was reconfigured to exclude its far western and far eastern portions. The new 12th, however, was no less Democratic than its predecessor, and Watt was reelected 10 more times. He only faced one relatively close race against Republican Scott Keadle.

=== Committee assignments ===
- Committee on Financial Services
  - Subcommittee on Financial Institutions and Consumer Credit
  - Subcommittee on Insurance, Housing and Community Opportunity
- Committee on the Judiciary
  - Subcommittee on Commercial and Administrative Law
  - Subcommittee on Intellectual Property, Competition, and the Internet (Ranking Member)

He previously served on the Joint Economic Committee.

=== Caucus memberships ===
- Congressional Black Caucus
  - (Watt was unanimously elected and served as the Chairman of the Congressional Black Caucus 2005–2006.)
- Congressional Progressive Caucus
- International Conservation Caucus

=== Legislative history ===
In 2010, Watt sponsored the Coin Modernization, Oversight, and Continuity Act. In 2011, Watt became a co-sponsor of Bill H.R.3261, otherwise known as the Stop Online Piracy Act. In 2013, Watts supported the Amash–Conyers Amendment, and was against the Innovation Act.

== Director of the Federal Housing Finance Agency ==
=== Nomination and confirmation ===
On May 1, 2013, President Obama announced his intent to nominate Watt to serve as the director of the Federal Housing Finance Agency. Almost immediately, the nomination drew criticism from Republicans, some of whom complained that no politician should lead the agency. Other Republican senators have argued that he lacks technical expertise on housing finance. Obama formally nominated Watt to the post on May 7, 2013.

In July 2013, the Senate Banking Committee advanced Watt's nomination on a party-line vote.

On October 28, 2013, Senate Majority Leader Harry Reid motioned to invoke cloture on Watt's nomination, setting up a key test of whether his nomination could overcome procedural hurdles and move to a final up-or-down vote. The motion failed on October 31, with 56 votes in favor, shy of the 60 needed to pass.

After a series of procedural votes on December 10, 2013, the Senate voted 57–40 to invoke cloture on Watt's nomination, ending the Republican filibuster under the Senate's recently modified rules for cloture on executive branch nominees. Later that same day, the Senate confirmed Watt in a 57–41 vote.

Watt was investigated in July 2018 for sexually harassing an employee.

== Controversies ==
=== Accusation by Ralph Nader of use of "racial epithet" ===
In 2004, Ralph Nader attended a meeting with the Congressional Black Caucus, at which Nader clashed with members of the caucus over his presidential bid. After the meeting, Nader alleged that Watt twice uttered an "obscene racial epithet" towards him. It was alleged that Watt said: "You're just another arrogant white man — telling us what we can do — it's all about your ego — another fucking arrogant white man." Although Nader (who is of Lebanese descent) wrote a letter to the Caucus and to Watt asking for an apology, none was offered.

=== Opposition to Federal Reserve auditing ===
In 2009, fellow congressman Ron Paul reported to Bloomberg that while Paul's bill HR 1207, which mandates an audit of the Federal Reserve, was in subcommittee, Watt had substantially altered the substance of the bill, a move which had "gutted" the bill's protections. According to Bloomberg News, on October 20, 2009, "The bill, with 308 co-sponsors, has been stripped of provisions that would remove Fed exemptions from audits of transactions with foreign central banks, monetary policy deliberations, transactions made under the direction of the Federal Open Market Committee (FOMC) and communications between the Board, the reserve banks and staff, Paul said today." Paul said there is "nothing left" in the bill after Watt's actions.

Paul responded when he and Alan Grayson of Florida passed a competing amendment hours before the bill cleared the House Financial Services Committee to restore the bill's original language and undo Watt's attempts to weaken its effects. Watt won support from Chairman Barney Frank of Massachusetts and the Congressional Black Caucus, both of which backed his amendment. Eight of the ten Black Caucus members on the committee voted against the Paul-Grayson amendment. Watt and Frank voted to inhibit the bill's approval. With pressure from the Congressional Black Caucus to delay consideration of the bill by the full House of Representatives, it is unclear when HR 1207 will face a final vote.

The country's largest bank Bank of America is headquartered in Charlotte in Watt's congressional district and has threatened to leave. The Sunlight Foundation reported that 45% of Watt's campaign contributions for 2009 are from corporations in the real estate, insurance and finance industries, the seventh-highest percentage of any member of Congress. Watt's largest contributors included American Express, Wachovia, Bank of America and the American Bankers Association.

=== Ethics investigation ===
Congressman Watt was formally investigated by the Office of Congressional Ethics over a series of fundraising events he was involved in. On December 9, 2009, Watt held a fundraiser and soon after withdrew a proposal he had introduced to subject auto dealers to more stringent regulations. The fundraiser brought donors mainly from large finance companies such as Goldman Sachs. Watt was later cleared of charges or wrongdoing.

In what the nonpartisan Citizens for Responsibility and Ethics in Washington (CREW) called "disgraceful", Watt introduced legislation to slash funding for the Office of Congressional Ethics.

=== Racial gerrymandering ===
In 1993, the design of his district was challenged as an instance of racial gerrymandering. The Supreme Court held in Shaw v. Reno that the unusual shape of the district required strict scrutiny of its racial purpose. Although it is rare for a law to survive strict scrutiny, the districting plan was upheld on remand as "narrowly tailored to further the state's compelling interest in complying with the Voting Rights Act".

== Political campaigns ==
In 1992, Watt was elected to the U.S. House of Representatives from North Carolina's newly created 12th Congressional District and became one of only two African American members elected to Congress from North Carolina in the 20th century, the other being Eva M. Clayton.

=== Recent election results ===
==== 2010 ====
US House of Representatives 12th District General Election 2010
Party	Candidate	Votes	%
Democratic	Mel Watt	103,495	63.88
Republican	Greg Dority	55,315	34.14
Libertarian	Lon Cecil	3,197	1.97
Total votes		162,007	100.00

==== 2012 ====
US House of Representatives 12th District General Election 2012
Party	Candidate	Votes	%
Democratic	Mel Watt	246,451	79.66
Republican	Jack Brosch	62,924	20.34
Libertarian	Lon Cecil	0	0
Total votes		309,375	100.00

== See also ==
- List of African-American United States representatives
- North Carolina Democratic Party

U.S. House of Representatives
New constituency	Member of the U.S. House of Representatives from North Carolina's 12th congressional district 1993–2014	Succeeded by Alma Adams
Preceded by Elijah Cummings	Chair of the Congressional Black Caucus; 2005–2007	Succeeded by Carolyn Cheeks Kilpatrick
Political offices
Preceded by Edward DeMarco; Acting	Director of the Federal Housing Finance Agency; 2014–2019	Succeeded by Joseph Otting; Acting
U.S. order of precedence (ceremonial)
Preceded by Stephen L. Neal as Former U.S. Representative	Order of precedence of the United States as Former U.S. Representative	Succeeded by Patrick McHenry as Former U.S. Representative
