= SongMeanings =

Music website

- Owners: Michael Schiano, Brian Adams
- Revenue: Non-profit
- Website: songmeanings.com
- Registration: required
- Launched: March 5, 2001; 25 years ago
- Current status: online

SongMeanings is a music website that encourages users to discuss and comment on the underlying meanings and messages of individual songs. As of May 2015, the website contains over 110,000 artists, 1,000,000 lyrics, 14,000 albums, and 530,000 members.

== History ==
SongMeanings was created by Michael Schiano and Brian Adams. Schiano states that the website's objective is to discuss "factual song meanings, personal experiences through the song, or even just their dismay for a song". The website was created in late 2000 by Schiano after he was inspired by a debate surrounding the meaning behind music group Ben Folds Five's song, "Brick".

In September 2011, SongMeanings agreed to terms with LyricFind to provide licensed lyrics. This agreement makes SongMeanings a legal entity amongst the hundreds of illegal lyrics sites.

In April 2012, TechCrunch announced a partnership between The Echo Nest and SongMeanings. In this partnership, SongMeanings makes available community discussions around the meanings of various lyrics.

SongMeanings for over a decade operated under songmeanings.net. During July 2013, SongMeanings began operating under songmeanings.com having acquired the domain a few months earlier.

== Lyrics ==
The website has received significant coverage in mainstream news for its discussions on certain songs. In July 2005, users fiercely debated the meanings of the lyrics to Coldplay's song, "Speed of Sound". The News & Observer called SongMeaning's discussions on the meaning to the lyrics of 50 Cent's "Wanksta" particularly "illuminating". Attention was brought to SongMeanings in July 2007 when it was used to discuss what Tyondai Braxton meant in his underground song "Atlas". However, one of the most hotly debated songs is the Eagles' "Hotel California" with thousands of users weighing in on the true meaning of the song; leading theories include addiction and a secret message from a satanic cult. Writing for British newspaper The Guardian, Laura Barton discussed SongMeanings in an article focusing on the problem of mishearing lyrics in a song, the inability to determine what the lyrics are due to a lack of sleevenotes when downloading songs, and whether or not it is even essential to know the lyrics in order to understand a song. From the website, she chose the discussion on The Beatles's song, "I Am the Walrus", as an example, due to its cryptic lyrics. Barton quoted one of the comments from the website, which considered the song as a "philosophy of life", and that it was a song that was a prime example of one that "threw into disarray the import placed upon lyrics". She then rebutted this by choosing Elton John's "Your Song" as a better example of this.

== Reception ==
SongMeanings has been recommended by several publications. The Herald & Review asked its readers, "Looking for an intense discussion on the meaning and influence of [50 Cent's] "In Da Club"? Maybe this site will help. It's also good if you're trying to figure out what exactly The Decemberists' "Sixteen Military Wives" means." The Jakarta Post also mentioned the site in an article on useful music- and lyrics-related websites. David Turim of the Chicago Tribune called it a "pretty fascinating site for any contemporary music fan".
