= Black World Wide Web protest =

1996 online activism action

The Turn the Web Black protest, also called the Great Web Blackout, the Turn Your Web Pages Black protest, and Black Thursday, was a February 8–9, 1996, online activism action, led by the Voters' Telecommunications Watch and the Center for Democracy and Technology, paralleling the longer-term Blue Ribbon Online Free Speech Campaign organized by the Electronic Frontier Foundation. It protested the Communications Decency Act (CDA), a piece of rider legislation for Internet censorship attached to the Telecommunications Act of 1996, and passed by the United States Congress on February 1, 1996. Timed to coincide with President Bill Clinton's signing of the bill on February 8, 1996, numerous websites had their background color turned to black for 48 hours to protest the CDA's perceived curtailment of freedom of expression. Thousands of websites, including a number of major ones, joined in the protest. The campaign was noted by major media outlets such as CNN, Time magazine and The New York Times.

== Background ==
The legislation which gave rise to the protest threatened fines or imprisonment for those accused of distributing "indecent" or "patently offensive" materials without providing some way of blocking access to minors. Opponents of the bill compared this to demanding librarians assess the age of library users before allowing them access to a particular book in the collection.

The Communications Decency Act was stuck down as unconstitutional by the U.S. Supreme Court in a 9–0 vote on June 26, 1997, upholding an earlier federal district court ruling. The majority of Justices found the CDA violated adults' First Amendment free speech rights with its overbroad suppression and vague language, despite any legitimate interest of the government in protecting children from "harmful materials". A concurring minority opinion, penned by Justice Sandra Day O'Connor and Chief Justice William H. Rehnquist, argued that the law might have been constitutional if limited to situations concerning an intent and knowledge to provide indecent materials to children.

== See also ==
- Protests against SOPA and PIPA, also undertaken to oppose a proposed law
