= CreativeFuture =

CreativeFuture is an advocacy organization of over 540 American entertainment organizations and 190,000 individuals with a goal of combating copyright infringement (commonly called piracy) and protecting American intellectual property. Its predecessor organization, Creative America endorsed the Stop Online Piracy Act and the PROTECT IP Act in 2011. The organization now advocates for voluntary industry solutions and effective public policies.

== History ==
Creative America was formed on July 6, 2011 with the goal of “protecting American jobs” and “serving as the unified voice of the more than 2 million Americans… whose jobs are supported by film and television, as well as people in other creative fields.” In October 2011, Creative America launched a national campaign to educate the public about copyright infringement, and to draw support for the Protect IP Act.

In February 2014, Creative America re-launched as CreativeFuture, and Ruth Vitale, the former co-president of Paramount Classics, became executive director.

== Supporters ==
CreativeFuture is supported by labor groups SAG-AFTRA, IATSE, and the Directors Guild of America and entertainment companies including CBS Corporation, NBCUniversal, The Walt Disney Company, Sony Pictures Entertainment, Viacom, Time Warner, Annapurna Pictures, New Regency, Participant Media, and others.

At its relaunch in 2014, CreativeFuture was initially supported by a coalition of 65 companies and organizations. Today, it is backed by more than 540 companies and organizations and more than 190,000 individuals from film, television, music, book publishing, photography, and other creative industries.

== Activities ==
=== Legislation ===
CreativeFuture supported H.R. 1695, a Bill that would make the Register of Copyrights a Presidentially-appointed, Senate-confirmed position, similar to other federal offices with oversight over major sectors of the American economy. On April 26, 2017, the House of Representatives passed H.R. 1695, (378-48).

=== Advocacy ===
In 2016, CreativeFuture opposed a proposal from the Federal Communications Commission (FCC) that would have required cable companies to “unlock” their set-top boxes and allowed third parties to produce their own.

During the 2016 presidential elections, CreativeFuture delivered petitions with over 70,000 signatures to political candidates and elected officials that advocated for strong copyright laws.

On May 2, 2017, CreativeFuture supported the introduction of the Register of Copyrights Selection and Accountability Act.

On October 12, 2017, CreativeFuture presented leaders in Congress with a petition signed by over 75,000 Americans that asks for strong copyright protections in the North American Free Trade Agreement (NAFTA).

In April 2018, CreativeFuture sent letters urging midterm candidates for Congress to hold Silicon Valley more accountable for what transpires on their platforms.

On May 15, 2018, CreativeFuture urged the Senate Committee on the Judiciary to take prompt action on S. 2823 – a legislative package that includes three other Bills presented to the same Congress: The Music Modernization Act (MMA) (S. 2334), the CLASSICS Act (S. 2393), and the AMP Act (S. 2625).

=== Advertising Partnerships ===
CreativeFuture works closely with the Trustworthy Accountability Group (TAG) - a program for advertisers created by the American Association of Advertising Agencies (4A's), the Association of National Advertisers (ANA), and the Interactive Advertising Bureau (IAB). Together, they work with brands and advertising agencies to keep ads off pirate sites.

=== Youth Outreach ===
CreativeFuture works with iKeepSafe to highlight their Copyright and Creativity for Ethical Digital Citizens educational modules and the International Alliance of Theatrical Stage Employees (IATSE) to include their members in school outreach.

=== Publications ===
In 2012, CreativeFuture launched a blog on its main website, written by staff and CreativeFuture members.

In February 2016, CreativeFuture launched StandCreative, a series of blogs written by emerging and established artists – across all creative disciplines – who have struggled to protect their works online.

In January 2017, CreativeFuture launched StandCreative II: Behind the Scenes, a series of interviews with creative professionals who work behind-the-scenes performing jobs most people might never have heard of.

CreativeFuture also publishes op-eds in various publications such as The New York Times, The Hill, The Hollywood Reporter, Variety, and others.
