= Surviving the World =

- Lesson 321 – "Archivals"
- Author(s): Lucas Landherr
- Website: survivingtheworld.net
- Current status/schedule: Completed
- Launch date: 31 May 2008
- End date: 1 June 2018
- Genre(s): Comedy

Surviving the World is a photo-based webcomic by professor Lucas Landherr, under the pseudonym Dante Shepherd. Taglined "Daily Lessons in Science, Literature, Love and Life," Surviving the World ran from 2008 to 2018. The webcomic consists of individual photographs of Landherr standing next to chalkboard, delivering humorous "life lessons". Surviving the World reached broad success, amassing millions of page views and helping Landherr through his education.

== Concept ==
In the first half of 2008, Lucas Landherr was a doctoral student of chemical engineering at Cornell University and was looking for a creative outlet. He did not want the scientific community to know that he had a side job as an artist, so he worked under the pseudonym Dr. Dante J.T. Shepherd. He was writing a script for a television show about college life, titled 101. He wanted more than just a few people to see his work, and asked online if anyone was willing to adapt it into an off-beat comic book. When no one with adequate art skills came forward, Landherr decided to create a webcomic himself using a photocomic format. The title 101 was already taken on the blogging site he was hosting on, so he changed the project's name to Surviving the World. Most of the first 100 pages were taken directly from Landherr's original script.

While reading Jeph Jacques' webcomic Questionable Content, Landherr recognized the creative potential of webcomics. Because he had no experience drawing, Landherr's webcomic consisted purely of photographs. Each photograph featured Landherr wearing a white lab coat and Red Sox hat, standing next to a chalkboard on which a daily lesson is written in big white capital letters. Speaking with the Northeastern University paper, Landherr said that his webcomic "really helped sustain me throughout my final two years of graduate school and my post-doc."

Landherr posted over 3,000 unique photographs on his website, focusing on a large variety of topics, such as reality TV and social networks. Surviving the World features obscure witticisms such as "If the 'best years' of your life took place in high school, then, for your sake, I hope you died tragically at 19" and "If you brush your teeth and it isn't a performance art, then clearly you're doing it wrong."

== History ==
Landherr launched several Kickstarter campaigns in the 2010s, raising tens of thousands of dollars to produce page-a-day calendars. By 2016, Surviving the World had amassed millions of page views, receiving an average of 10,000 visitors per day. Landherr took part in a 2016 exhibit by Waterfall Arts in Belfast, Maine, where artists represent chemical elements through art and cartoons. Here he presented Thorium as the Norse god Thor, and transformed Seaborgium into a portrait of Glenn T. Seaborg.

Surviving the World ended on June 1, 2018, shortly after the webcomic's tenth anniversary.

== Reception ==
Stephanie Mlot of the Frederick News-Post described Surviving the World as "one of [her] favorite discoveries. The pure obscurity of the man in the white lab coat and Red Sox cap add mystery and intrigue to an already random commodity."

Jules Rivera of Comic Related criticized the fact that Surviving the World pages consist purely of individual, unedited photographs, saying that though he finds the webcomic amusing, he does not consider it a webcomic: "It's a photographic affirmation at best."
