= United States House Judiciary Subcommittee on the Constitution and Limited Government =

Subcommittee of Committee on the Judiciary
- Active United States House of Representatives; 119th Congress

Leadership
- Chair: Chip Roy (R)
- Ranking Member: Mary Gay Scanlon (D)

Structure
- Seats: 16 (16 currently filled) 9/9 7/7
- Political parties: Majority (9): Republican (9); Minority (7): Democratic (7)

Meeting place
- 2138, Rayburn House Office Building; Washington, D.C. 20515

Phone number
- (202)-225-6906

The Subcommittee on the Constitution and Limited Government is one of six subcommittees of the United States House Committee on the Judiciary. Until 2019 it was called the Subcommittee on the Constitution and Civil Justice, and between 2019 and 2023, the Subcommittee on the Constitution, Civil Rights and Civil Liberties.

== Jurisdiction ==
Constitutional rights, constitutional amendments, Federal civil rights, voting rights, claims against the United States, non-immigration private claims bills, ethics in government, tort liability, federal charters of incorporation, and other matters.

== Members, 119th Congress ==
Majority	Minority
Chip Roy, Texas, Chair; Tom McClintock, California; Thomas Massie, Kentucky; Harriet Hageman, Wyoming; Wesley Hunt, Texas; Glenn Grothman, Wisconsin; Mark Harris, North Carolina; Bob Onder, Missouri; Brandon Gill, Texas	Mary Gay Scanlon, Pennsylvania, Ranking Member; Steve Cohen, Tennessee; Pramila Jayapal, Washington; Becca Balint, Vermont; Sydney Kamlager-Dove, California; Dan Goldman, New York
Ex officio
Jim Jordan, Ohio	Jaime Raskin, Maryland

== Historical membership rosters ==
=== 115th Congress ===
Majority	Minority
Steve King, Iowa, Chairman; Louie Gohmert, Texas; Karen Handel, Georgia	Steve Cohen, Tennessee, Ranking Member; Jamie Raskin, Maryland; Ted Deutch, Florida
Ex officio
Bob Goodlatte, Virginia	Jerrold Nadler, New York

=== 116th Congress ===
Majority	Minority
Steve Cohen, Tennessee, Chair; Jamie Raskin, Maryland, Vice Chair; Eric Swalwell, California; Mary Gay Scanlon, Pennsylvania; Madeleine Dean, Pennsylvania; Sylvia Garcia, Texas; Veronica Escobar, Texas; Sheila Jackson Lee, Texas	Mike Johnson, Louisiana, Ranking Member; Louie Gohmert, Texas; Jim Jordan, Ohio; Guy Reschenthaler, Pennsylvania; Ben Cline, Virginia; Kelly Armstrong, North Dakota
Ex officio
Jerrold Nadler, New York	Doug Collins, Georgia (until March 12, 2020); Jim Jordan, Ohio (March 12, 2020 on)

=== 117th Congress ===
Majority	Minority
Steve Cohen, Tennessee, Chair; Jamie Raskin, Maryland; Deborah K. Ross, North Carolina; Hank Johnson, Georgia; Sylvia Garcia, Texas; Cori Bush, Missouri; Sheila Jackson Lee, Texas	Mike Johnson, Louisiana, Ranking Member; Tom McClintock, California; Chip Roy, Texas; Michelle Fischbach, Minnesota; Burgess Owens, Utah
Ex officio
Jerrold Nadler, New York	Jim Jordan, Ohio

=== 118th Congress ===
Majority	Minority
Mike Johnson, Louisiana, Chair (until October 25, 2023); Chip Roy, Texas, Chair (from October 26, 2023); Tom McClintock, California; Dan Bishop, North Carolina; Kevin Kiley, California; Harriet Hageman, Wyoming; Wesley Hunt, Texas; Russell Fry, South Carolina	Mary Gay Scanlon, Pennsylvania, Ranking Member; Steve Cohen, Tennessee; Veronica Escobar, Texas; Cori Bush, Missouri; Sheila Jackson Lee, Texas; Hank Johnson, Georgia; Becca Balint, Vermont
Ex officio
Jim Jordan, Ohio	Jerrold Nadler, New York

== See also ==
- United States Senate Judiciary Subcommittee on the Constitution, Civil Rights and Property Rights
