= United States House Judiciary Subcommittee on the Administrative State, Regulatory Reform, and Antitrust =

Subcommittee of Committee on the Judiciary
- Active United States House of Representatives; 119th Congress

Leadership
- Chair: Scott L. Fitzgerald (R)
- Ranking Member: Jerrold Nadler (D)

Structure
- Seats: 14 (14 currently filled) 8/8 6/6
- Political parties: Majority (8): Republican (8); Minority (6): Democratic (6)

Meeting place
- 2138, Rayburn House Office Building; Washington, D.C. 20515

Phone number
- (202)-225-6906

United States House Judiciary Subcommittee on the Administrative State, Regulatory Reform, and Antitrust is a subcommittee within the House Committee on the Judiciary. The Subcommittee's equivalent in the Senate is the Senate Judiciary Subcommittee on Competition Policy, Antitrust and Consumer Rights. It was previously known as the Subcommittee on Antitrust, Commercial and Administrative Law.

== Jurisdiction ==
Bankruptcy and commercial law, bankruptcy judgeships, administrative law, independent counsel, state taxation affecting interstate commerce, interstate compacts, antitrust matters, other appropriate matters as referred by the chairman, and relevant oversight.

== Members, 119th Congress ==
Majority	Minority
Scott Fitzgerald, Wisconsin, Chair; Darrell Issa, California; Ben Cline, Virginia; Lance Gooden, Texas; Harriet Hageman, Wyoming; Mark Harris, North Carolina; Derek Schmidt, Kansas; Michael Baumgartner, Washington	Jerrold Nadler, New York, Ranking Member; Lou Correa, California; Becca Balint, Vermont; Chuy García, Illinois; Zoe Lofgren, California; Hank Johnson, Georgia
Ex officio
Jim Jordan, Ohio	Jaime Raskin, Maryland

== Historical membership rosters ==
=== 118th Congress ===
Majority	Minority
Thomas Massie, Kentucky, Chair; Darrell Issa, California; Ken Buck, Colorado; Matt Gaetz, Florida; Dan Bishop, North Carolina; Victoria Spartz, Indiana; Scott L. Fitzgerald, Wisconsin; Cliff Bentz, Oregon; Lance Gooden, Texas; Jeff Van Drew, New Jersey; Ben Cline, Virginia; Harriet Hageman, Wyoming; Nathaniel Moran, Texas	David Cicilline, Rhode Island, Ranking Member (until May 31, 2023); Lou Correa, California, Ranking Member (from May 31, 2023); Hank Johnson, Georgia; Eric Swalwell, California; Ted Lieu, California; Pramila Jayapal, Washington; Mary Gay Scanlon, Pennsylvania; Joe Neguse, Colorado; Lucy McBath, Georgia; Zoe Lofgren, California; Steve Cohen, Tennessee; Glenn Ivey, Maryland; Becca Balint, Vermont
Ex officio
Jim Jordan, Ohio	Jerrold Nadler, New York

=== 117th Congress ===
Majority	Minority
David Cicilline, Rhode Island, Chair; Joe Neguse, Colorado; Eric Swalwell, California; Mondaire Jones, New York; Ted Deutch, Florida; Hakeem Jeffries, New York; Jamie Raskin, Maryland; Pramila Jayapal, Washington, Vice Chair; Val Demings, Florida; Lou Correa, California; Mary Gay Scanlon, Pennsylvania; Lucy McBath, Georgia; Madeleine Dean, Pennsylvania; Hank Johnson, Georgia	Ken Buck, Colorado, Ranking Member; Darrell Issa, California; Matt Gaetz, Florida; Mike Johnson, Louisiana; Greg Steube, Florida; Dan Bishop, North Carolina; Michelle Fischbach, Minnesota; Victoria Spartz, Indiana; Scott L. Fitzgerald, Wisconsin; Cliff Bentz, Oregon; Burgess Owens, Utah
Ex officio
Jerrold Nadler, New York	Jim Jordan, Ohio

=== 116th Congress ===
Majority	Minority
David Cicilline, Rhode Island, Chair; Hank Johnson, Georgia; Jamie Raskin, Maryland; Pramila Jayapal, Washington; Val Demings, Florida; Mary Gay Scanlon, Pennsylvania; Joe Neguse, Colorado, Vice Chair; Lucy McBath, Georgia	Jim Sensenbrenner, Wisconsin, Ranking Member; Matt Gaetz, Florida; Ken Buck, Colorado; Kelly Armstrong, North Dakota; Greg Steube, Florida
Ex officio
Jerrold Nadler, New York	Doug Collins, Georgia (until March 12, 2020); Jim Jordan, Ohio (since March 12, 2020)

=== 115th Congress ===
Majority	Minority
Tom Marino, Pennsylvania, Chairman; Blake Farenthold, Texas, Vice Chair; Darrell Issa, California; Doug Collins, Georgia; Ken Buck, Colorado; John Ratcliffe, Texas; Matt Gaetz, Florida	David Cicilline, Rhode Island, Ranking Member; Hank Johnson, Georgia; Eric Swalwell, California; Pramila Jayapal, Washington, until April 2018; Brad Schneider, Illinois; Jamie Raskin, Maryland, until April 2018; Val Demings, Florida
Ex officio
Bob Goodlatte, Virginia	Jerrold Nadler, New York

== Significant hearings ==
- Equal Justice for Our Military Act of 2009 (June 11, 2009)

== See also ==
- United States House Committee on the Judiciary
- United States Senate Judiciary Subcommittee on Antitrust, Competition Policy and Consumer Rights
