= United States House Judiciary Subcommittee on Courts, Intellectual Property, Artificial Intelligence, and the Internet =

Subcommittee within the U.S. House Judiciary Committee

Subcommittee of Committee on the Judiciary
- Active United States House of Representatives; 119th Congress

Leadership
- Chair: Darrell Issa (R)
- Ranking Member: Hank Johnson (D)

Structure
- Seats: 16 (16 currently filled) 9/9 7/7
- Political parties: Majority (9): Republican (8); Independent (1); Minority (7): Democratic (7)

Meeting place
- 2138, Rayburn House Office Building; Washington, D.C. 20515

Phone number
- (202)-225-6906

The House Judiciary Subcommittee on Courts, Intellectual Property, Artificial Intelligence, and the Internet is a subcommittee within the House Judiciary Committee. It was established in 2011. Artificial intelligence was added to the subcommittee's title in 2025.

== Jurisdiction ==
The subcommittee has jurisdiction over the following areas:

- Administrative Office of the United States Courts
- Federal Rules of Evidence
- Federal Rules of Civil Procedure and Federal Rules of Appellate Procedure
- Judicial ethics
- Copyright law of the United States
- United States patent law
- United States trademark law
- Information technology

== Members, 119th Congress ==
Majority	Minority
Darrell Issa, California, Chair; Thomas Massie, Kentucky; Scott Fitzgerald, Wisconsin; Ben Cline, Virginia; Lance Gooden, Texas; Kevin Kiley, California (until March 18, 2026); Laurel Lee, Florida; Russell Fry, South Carolina; Michael Baumgartner, Washington	Hank Johnson, Georgia, Ranking Member; Zoe Lofgren, California; Ted Lieu, California; Joe Neguse, Colorado; Deborah Ross, North Carolina; Sydney Kamlager-Dove, California
Ex officio
Jim Jordan, Ohio	Jaime Raskin, Maryland

== Historical membership rosters ==
=== 115th Congress ===
Majority	Minority
Darrell Issa, California, Chairman; Doug Collins, Georgia, Vice Chair; Lamar S. Smith, Texas; Steve Chabot, Ohio; Trent Franks, Arizona; Jim Jordan, Ohio; Ted Poe, Texas; Jason Chaffetz, Utah; Tom Marino, Pennsylvania; Raúl Labrador, Idaho; Blake Farenthold, Texas; Ron DeSantis, Florida; Matt Gaetz, Florida; Andy Biggs, Arizona	Hank Johnson, Georgia, Ranking Member; Ted Deutch, Florida; Karen Bass, California; Cedric Richmond, Louisiana; Hakeem Jeffries, New York; Eric Swalwell, California; Ted Lieu, California; Brad Schneider, Illinois; Zoe Lofgren, California; Steve Cohen, Tennessee; David Cicilline, Rhode Island; Pramila Jayapal, Washington
Ex officio
Bob Goodlatte, Virginia	Jerrold Nadler, New York

=== 116th Congress ===
Majority	Minority
Hank Johnson, Georgia, Chair; Ted Deutch, Florida; Cedric Richmond, Louisiana; Hakeem Jeffries, New York; Ted Lieu, California; Greg Stanton, Arizona; Zoe Lofgren, California; Steve Cohen, Tennessee; Karen Bass, California; Eric Swalwell, California; Lou Correa, California, Vice Chair	Martha Roby, Alabama, Ranking Member; Steve Chabot, Ohio; Jim Jordan, Ohio; John Ratcliffe, Texas; Matt Gaetz, Florida; Mike Johnson, Louisiana; Andy Biggs, Arizona; Guy Reschenthaler, Pennsylvania; Ben Cline, Virginia
Ex officio
Jerrold Nadler, New York	Doug Collins, Georgia (until March 12, 2020); Jim Jordan, Ohio (since March 12, 2020)

=== 117th Congress ===
Majority	Minority
Hank Johnson, Georgia, Chair; Ted Deutch, Florida; Hakeem Jeffries, New York; Ted Lieu, California; Karen Bass, California; Eric Swalwell, California; Mondaire Jones, New York; Deborah Ross, North Carolina; Joe Neguse, Colorado	Darrell Issa, California, Ranking Member; Steve Chabot, Ohio; Louie Gohmert, Texas; Matt Gaetz, Florida; Mike Johnson, Louisiana; Tom Tiffany, Wisconsin; Thomas Massie, Kentucky; Dan Bishop, North Carolina; Michelle Fischbach, Minnesota; Scott Fitzgerald, Wisconsin; Cliff Bentz, Oregon
Ex officio
Jerrold Nadler, New York	Jim Jordan, Ohio

=== 118th Congress ===
Majority	Minority
Darrell Issa, California, Chair; Thomas Massie, Kentucky; Scott Fitzgerald, Wisconsin; Cliff Bentz, Oregon; Ben Cline, Virginia; Lance Gooden, Texas; Kevin Kiley, California; Nathaniel Moran, Texas; Laurel Lee, Florida; Russell Fry, South Carolina	Hank Johnson, Georgia, Ranking Member; Ted Lieu, California; Joe Neguse, Colorado; Deborah Ross, North Carolina; Adam Schiff, California; Zoe Lofgren, California; Madeleine Dean, Pennsylvania; Glenn Ivey, Maryland
Ex officio
Jim Jordan, Ohio	Jerrold Nadler, New York

== See also ==
- United States House Committee on the Judiciary
