= United States House Judiciary Subcommittee on Immigration Integrity, Security, and Enforcement =

US House committee

Subcommittee of Committee on the Judiciary
- Active United States House of Representatives; 119th Congress

Leadership
- Chair: Tom McClintock (R)
- Ranking Member: Pramila Jayapal (D)

Structure
- Seats: 26 (24 currently filled) 14/14 10/12
- Political parties: Majority (14): Republican (14); Minority (10): Democratic (10)

Meeting place
- 2138, Rayburn House Office Building; Washington, D.C. 20515

Phone number
- (202)-225-6906

The Subcommittee on Immigration Integrity, Security and Enforcement is a standing subcommittee within the United States House Committee on the Judiciary. It was previously known as the Subcommittee on Immigration and Citizenship.

== Jurisdiction ==
Immigration and naturalization, border security and drug interdiction, admission of refugees, treaties, conventions and international agreements, claims against the United States, private immigration and claims bills, and non-border enforcement.

== Members, 119th Congress ==
| Majority | Minority |
|---|---|
| Tom McClintock, California, Chair; Andy Biggs, Arizona; Tom Tiffany, Wisconsin; Chip Roy, Texas; Jeff Van Drew, New Jersey; Troy Nehls, Texas; Barry Moore, Alabama; Wesley Hunt, Texas; Russell Fry, South Carolina; Glenn Grothman, Wisconsin; Brad Knott, North Carolina; Bob Onder, Missouri; Derek Schmidt, Kansas; Brandon Gill, Texas | Pramila Jayapal, Washington, Ranking Member; Jerry Nadler, New York; Lou Correa, California; Mary Gay Scanlon, Pennsylvania; Deborah Ross, North Carolina; Chuy García, Illinois; Jasmine Crockett, Texas; Zoe Lofgren, California; Steve Cohen, Tennessee |
Ex officio
| Jim Jordan, Ohio | Jaime Raskin, Maryland |

== Historical membership rosters ==
=== 118th Congress ===
| Majority | Minority |
|---|---|
| Tom McClintock, California, Chair; Ken Buck, Colorado; Andy Biggs, Arizona; Tom Tiffany, Wisconsin; Victoria Spartz, Indiana; Chip Roy, Texas, Vice Chair; Barry Moore, Alabama; Jeff Van Drew, New Jersey; Troy Nehls, Texas; Wesley Hunt, Texas | Pramila Jayapal, Washington, Ranking Member; Zoe Lofgren, California; Lou Correa, California; Sylvia Garcia, Texas; Joe Neguse, Colorado; Veronica Escobar, Texas; Sheila Jackson Lee, Texas (until July 19, 2024); Mary Gay Scanlon, Pennsylvania |
Ex officio
| Jim Jordan, Ohio | Jerry Nadler, New York |

=== 117th Congress ===
| Majority | Minority |
|---|---|
| Zoe Lofgren, California, Chair; Pramila Jayapal, Washington; Lou Correa, California; Sylvia Garcia, Texas; Joe Neguse, Colorado; Veronica Escobar, Texas; Sheila Jackson Lee, Texas; Joe Neguse, Colorado, Vice Chair; Mary Gay Scanlon, Pennsylvania | Tom McClintock, California, Ranking Member; Ken Buck, Colorado; Andy Biggs, Arizona; Tom Tiffany, Wisconsin; Chip Roy, Texas; Victoria Spartz, Indiana |
Ex officio
| Jerry Nadler, New York | Jim Jordan, Ohio |

=== 116th Congress ===
| Majority | Minority |
|---|---|
| Zoe Lofgren, California, Chair; Pramila Jayapal, Washington, Vice Chair; Lou Correa, California; Sylvia Garcia, Texas; Joe Neguse, Colorado; Debbie Mucarsel-Powell, Florida; Veronica Escobar, Texas; Sheila Jackson Lee, Texas; Mary Gay Scanlon, Pennsylvania | Ken Buck, Colorado, Ranking Member; Andy Biggs, Arizona; Tom McClintock, California; Debbie Lesko, Arizona; Kelly Armstrong, North Dakota; Greg Steube, Florida |
Ex officio
| Jerry Nadler, New York | Doug Collins, Georgia (until March 12, 2020); Jim Jordan, Ohio (since March 12, 2020) |

=== 115th Congress ===
| Majority | Minority |
|---|---|
| Jim Sensenbrenner, Wisconsin, Chairman; Raul Labrador, Idaho, Vice Chair; Lamar S. Smith, Texas; Steve King, Iowa; Jim Jordan, Ohio; Ken Buck, Colorado; Mike Johnson, Louisiana; Andy Biggs, Arizona | Zoe Lofgren, California, Ranking Member; Luis Gutierrez, Illinois; Pramila Jayapal, Washington; Sheila Jackson Lee, Texas; David Cicilline, Rhode Island |
Ex officio
| Bob Goodlatte, Virginia | Jerry Nadler, New York |
