= United States House Judiciary Task Force on Judicial Impeachment =

On June 19, 2008, the Judicial Conference of the United States delivered to the United States House of Representatives notification certifying "its determination that consideration of impeachment of United States District Judge Thomas Porteous (E.D. La.) may be warranted." Later that year, the 110th Congress authorized its Judiciary Committee to establish a task Force to run an impeachment inquiry. The task force's authority was renewed by the 111th Congress on January 13, 2009. In May of that year, its authority was expanded to include an investigation of Samuel Kent, a judge of the United States District Court for the Southern District of Texas, leading to his impeachment by the House of Representatives on June 19, 2009.

== Judge Thomas Porteous ==
On June 18, 2008, the Judicial Conference of the United States transmitted a certificate to the Speaker of the U.S. House of Representatives expressing the Conference's determination that consideration of impeachment of Judge Porteous might be warranted. The certificate stated that there was substantial evidence that Judge Porteous "repeatedly committed perjury by signing false financial disclosure forms under oath", thus concealing "cash and things of value that he solicited and received from lawyers appearing in litigation before him". In a specific case, "he denied a motion to recuse based on his relationship with lawyers in the case ... and failed to disclose that the lawyers in question had often provided him with cash. Thereafter, while a bench verdict (that is, a verdict by a judge sitting without a jury) was pending, he solicited and received from the lawyers appearing before him illegal gratuities in the form of cash and other things of value", thus depriving "the public of its right to his honest services". The certificate concluded that this conduct "constituted an abuse of his judicial office" in violation of the Canons of the Code of Conduct for United States Judges.

The certificate also stated that there was substantial evidence that Porteous had "repeatedly committed perjury by signing false financial disclosure forms under oath" in connection with his bankruptcy, allowing "him to obtain a discharge of his debts while continuing his lifestyle at the expense of his creditors", and that he had "made false representations to gain the extension of a bank loan with the intent to defraud the bank".

On September 18, 2008, the House Judiciary Committee voted unanimously to proceed with an investigation of the bribery and perjury allegations. On October 15, 2008, House Judiciary Chair John Conyers announced that Alan I. Barron had been hired as Special Counsel to lead an inquiry into Judge Porteous' impeachment. Representatives Adam Schiff (D-CA) and Bob Goodlatte (R-VA) were designated as Chair and Ranking Member, respectively, to lead the task force conducting the inquiry.

On January 13, 2009, the U.S. House of Representatives passed H. Res. 15 by voice vote, authorizing and directing the Committee on the Judiciary to inquire whether the House should impeach Judge Porteous. The resolution was sponsored by Rep. John Conyers, Chairman of the Judiciary Committee, and was proposed because the investigation ended with the previous Congress and a renewal was needed. In October 2009, Reps. Conyers and Lamar Smith introduced a resolution asking to access the judge's tax returns as part of the investigation. The resolution was referred to the Rules Committee and, at the same time, a timeframe was established which called for the investigation to end in November 2009; the Judicial Task force on Judicial Impeachment would decide by the end of the year if impeachment would be recommended to the Judiciary Committee. If the recommendation was for impeachment, the Committee would take up the matter in early 2010. The task force scheduled the first hearings on the case for November 17 and 18, with more meetings in December before a final recommendation was made.

On November 13, Porteous sued the task force, claiming that the panel was violating his Fifth Amendment rights by using testimony given under immunity in making the case against him. On January 21, 2010, the panel voted unanimously to recommend four articles of impeachment to the full Judiciary Committee, which, on January 27, voted to send the articles of impeachment to the full House.

=== Trial of Thomas Porteous ===
Speaker Nancy Pelosi appointed several members of the task force as managers in the impeachment trial, namely Schiff and Rep. Bob Goodlatte, R-Virginia, were named the lead impeachment managers for the Senate trial, The articles of impeachment were sent to the Senate, where the proceedings were started on March 17.

Judicial impeachment trials are rather different than Presidential ones. The President pro Tempore appointed Claire McCaskill to be the chairperson of a select impeachment trial committee, which would conduct all but the closing arguments of the trial. Orrin Hatch was vice Chairman and he and McCaskill served as co-judges.

After a version of Voir dire, a jury of senators was chosen to serve on the committee: Amy Klobuchar, Minnesota; Sheldon Whitehouse, Rhode Island; Tom Udall, New Mexico; Jeanne Shaheen, New Hampshire; Edward Kaufman, Delaware, for the Democrats, and Jim DeMint, South Carolina; John Barrasso, Wyoming; Roger Wicker, Mississippi; Mike Johanns, Nebraska; and James Risch, Idaho, for the Republicans.

Trials take a long time to organize, and after an organizational meeting on April 13, 2010, the first sessions of the trial did not begin until August 2. The managers and defense attorney Jonathan Turley had to what was to all a typical trial. It lasted until September 21. A report finding Porteous provisionally guilty was sent to the Senate floor on December 1, and Turley and Schiff gave their closing statements to the full Senate on December 7. The judge was removed from office the following day by a near-unanimous vote.

The trial process had lasted nearly a year.

== Judge Samuel Kent ==
On May 14, 2009, Judge Kent refused to resign after he was sentenced to prison. The House Judiciary Committee then voted to begin an impeachment investigation. Proceedings continued after the judge resigned in June 2009 but set an effective date for his resignation in 2010. Hearings were held on June 2.

Chaired by Rep Adam Schiff, it featured the emotional and sometimes halting testimony of Cathy McBroom and Donna Wilkerson. The two Texas women sat side by side at the witness table, never smiling, and recounted the events that Kent's guilty plea acknowledged had occurred. Both women quoted Kent as frequently saying: "I am the government." Wilkerson described trying to tell her teenage daughter to never endure any sexual misconduct, even if it meant harsh consequences such as losing her job.

Kent and his lawyer, Dick DeGuerin, refused to attend, calling it a "circus".

On June 9, the Task Force reported four articles to the full House Judiciary Committee, which sent them to the full House the next day, After his formal impeachment on June 19, Kent resigned as the Senate trial was being organized.

== Members of the task force ==
The members of the House Judiciary Committee Task Force on Judicial Impeachment during the 111th Congress were:

Democratic Party members
Adam Schiff, Chairman	CA 29
Sheila Jackson-Lee	TX 18
Bill Delahunt	MA 10
Steve Cohen	TN 9
Hank Johnson	GA 4
Charlie Gonzalez	TX 20
Pedro Pierluisi	PR at-large

Republican Party members
Bob Goodlatte, Ranking Member	VA 6
Jim Sensenbrenner	WI 5
Dan Lungren	CA 3
Randy Forbes	VA 4
Louie Gohmert	TX 1
