= United States House Judiciary Subcommittee on Oversight =

US House committee

Subcommittee of Committee on the Judiciary
- Active United States House of Representatives; 119th Congress

Leadership
- Chair: Jeff Van Drew (R)
- Ranking Member: Jasmine Crockett (D)

Structure
- Seats: 8 (7 currently filled) 5/5 2/3
- Political parties: Majority (5): Republican (5); Minority (2): Democratic (2)

Meeting place
- 2138, Rayburn House Office Building; Washington, D.C. 20515

Phone number
- (202)-225-6906

The Subcommittee on Oversight is a standing subcommittee within the United States House Committee on the Judiciary. It was created for the 118th Congress as the Subcommittee on Responsiveness and Accountability to Oversight.

== Jurisdiction ==
From the committee's website, the subcommittee's jurisdiction includes:

The Subcommittee on Responsiveness and Accountability To Oversight has jurisdiction over the responsiveness of agencies, departments, and entities to oversight requests of the Committee and any Subcommittee of the Committee and the operations of their congressional liaisons or offices of legislative affairs, with respect to the necessity or desirability of enacting, changing, or repealing any legislation within the jurisdiction of the Committee.

== Members, 119th Congress ==
Majority	Minority
Jeff Van Drew, New Jersey, Chair; Barry Moore, Alabama; Bob Onder, Missouri; Derek Schmidt, Kansas; Brandon Gill, Texas	Jasmine Crockett, Texas, Ranking Member; Jared Moskowitz, Florida; Hank Johnson, Georgia
Ex officio
Jim Jordan, Ohio	Jaime Raskin, Maryland

== Historical membership rosters ==
=== 118th Congress ===
Majority	Minority
Ben Cline, Virginia, Chair; Jeff Van Drew, New Jersey; Nathaniel Moran, Texas; Laurel Lee, Florida	Eric Swalwell, California, Ranking Member; Glenn Ivey, Maryland
Ex officio
Jim Jordan, Ohio	Jerry Nadler, New York
