= United States House Committee on the Judiciary =

Standing committee of the United States House of Representatives

House Judiciary Committee
Standing committee
- Active United States House of Representatives; 119th Congress

History
- Formed: June 6, 1813

Leadership
- Chair: Jim Jordan (R); Since January 7, 2023
- Ranking Member: Jamie Raskin (D); Since January 3, 2025

Structure
- Seats: 44 (44 currently filled) 25/25 19/19
- Political parties: Majority (25): Republican (24); Independent (1); Minority (19): Democratic (19)

Jurisdiction
- Senate counterpart: Senate Committee on the Judiciary

Subcommittees
- Immigration Integrity, Security, and Enforcement; Courts, Intellectual Property, Artificial Intelligence, and the Internet; The Administrative State, Regulatory Reform, and Antitrust; Crime and Federal Government Surveillance; The Constitution and Limited Government; Oversight

Meeting place
- 2138, Rayburn House Office Building; Washington, D.C. 20515

Website
- judiciary.house.gov (Republican) democrats-judiciary.house.gov (Democratic)

Phone number
- (202)-225-6906

The United States House Committee on the Judiciary, also called the House Judiciary Committee, is a standing committee of the United States House of Representatives. It is charged with overseeing the administration of justice within the federal courts, federal administrative agencies, and federal law enforcement entities. The Judiciary Committee is often involved in the impeachment process against federal officials. Because of the legal nature of its oversight, committee members usually have a legal background, but this is not required.

In the 119th Congress, the chair of the committee is Republican Jim Jordan of Ohio, and the ranking minority member is Democrat Jamie Raskin of Maryland.

== History ==
The committee was created on June 3, 1813, for the purpose of considering legislation related to the judicial system. This committee approved impeachment resolutions/articles of impeachment against presidents in four instances: against Andrew Johnson (in 1867), Richard Nixon (in 1974), Bill Clinton (in 1998), and Donald Trump (in 2019).

In the 115th Congress, the chair of the committee was Republican Bob Goodlatte of Virginia, and the ranking minority member was initially Democrat John Conyers of Michigan. On November 26, 2017, Conyers stepped down from his position as ranking member, while he faced an ethics investigation. On November 28, 2017, Jerrold Nadler of New York was named as acting ranking member.

In the 116th Congress, the House flipped from Republican to Democratic control. Doug Collins, a Republican from Georgia's 9th congressional district, became ranking member and served from 2019 to 2020. In early 2020, Collins stepped down from his leadership position when he became a candidate in the 2020 special election held to replace retiring U.S. senator Johnny Isakson. Under House Republican rules, members must relinquish leadership positions if they launch a bid for another office. Collins was succeeded as ranking member by Jordan, who represents Ohio's 4th congressional district, but who has never taken a bar examination or practiced law.

=== Predecessor committees ===
- Claims: Functions merged in 1946
- Immigration and Naturalization: Functions merged in 1946
- Internal Security: Functions merged in 1975
  - Un-American Activities: Functions merged into Internal Security in 1969
- Patents: Functions merged in 1946
- Revision of Laws: Functions merged in 1946
- War Claims: Functions merged in 1946

== Members, 119th Congress ==
Majority	Minority
Jim Jordan, Ohio, Chair; Darrell Issa, California; Andy Biggs, Arizona; Tom McClintock, California; Tom Tiffany, Wisconsin; Thomas Massie, Kentucky; Chip Roy, Texas; Scott L. Fitzgerald, Wisconsin; Ben Cline, Virginia; Lance Gooden, Texas; Jeff Van Drew, New Jersey; Troy Nehls, Texas; Barry Moore, Alabama; Kevin Kiley, California (until March 18, 2026); Harriet Hageman, Wyoming; Laurel M. Lee, Florida; Wesley Hunt, Texas; Russell Fry, South Carolina; Kevin Kiley, California; Glenn Grothman, Wisconsin; Brad Knott, North Carolina; Mark Harris, North Carolina; Bob Onder, Missouri; Derek Schmidt, Kansas; Brandon Gill, Texas; Michael Baumgartner, Washington	Jamie Raskin, Maryland, Ranking Member; Jerrold Nadler, New York; Zoe Lofgren, California; Steve Cohen, Tennessee; Hank Johnson, Georgia; Eric Swalwell, California (until April 14, 2026); Ted Lieu, California; Pramila Jayapal, Washington; Lou Correa, California; Mary Gay Scanlon, Pennsylvania; Joe Neguse, Colorado; Lucy McBath, Georgia; Deborah K. Ross, North Carolina; Becca Balint, Vermont; Chuy García, Illinois; Sydney Kamlager-Dove, California; Jared Moskowitz, Florida; Dan Goldman, New York; Jasmine Crockett, Texas; Summer Lee, Pennsylvania

Kevin Kiley was a member until March 18, 2026, and was removed following his departure from the Republican Party; he was reinstated on April 15 at a lower rank. Eric Swalwell was a member until his departure on April 14, 2026.

Resolutions electing members: H.Res. 13 (Chair), H.Res. 14 (Ranking Member), H.Res. 31 (R), H.Res. 40 (D), H.Res. 1176 (Kiley), H.Res. 1352 (Lee)

== Subcommittees ==
Subcommittee	Chair	Ranking Member
Administrative State, Regulatory Reform, and Antitrust	Scott Fitzgerald (R-WI)	Jerry Nadler (D-NY)
The Constitution and Limited Government	Chip Roy (R-TX)	Mary Gay Scanlon (D-PA)
Courts, Intellectual Property, Artificial Intelligence, and the Internet	Darrell Issa (R-CA)	Hank Johnson (D-GA)
Crime and Federal Government Surveillance	Andy Biggs (R-AZ)	Lucy McBath (D-GA)
Immigration Integrity, Security, and Enforcement	Tom McClintock (R-CA)	Pramila Jayapal (D-WA)
Oversight	Jeff Van Drew (R-NJ)	Jasmine Crockett (D-TX)

== Committee leadership ==
Chairs
Name	Party	State	Start	End
Charles Ingersoll	Democratic-Republican	PA	1813	1815
Hugh Nelson	Democratic-Republican	VA	1815	1819
John Sergeant	Democratic-Republican	PA	1819	1822
Hugh Nelson	Democratic-Republican	VA	1822	1823
Daniel Webster	Federalist	MA	1823	1827
Philip Barbour	Democratic	VA	1827	1829
James Buchanan	Democratic	PA	1829	1831
Warren Davis	Democratic	SC	1831	1832
John Bell	Democratic	TN	1832	1834
Thomas Foster	Whig	GA	1834	1835
Samuel Beardsley	Democratic	NY	1835	1836
Francis Thomas	Democratic	MD	1836	1839
John Sergeant	Whig	PA	1839	1841
Daniel Barnard	Whig	NY	1841	1843
William Wilkins	Democratic	PA	1843	1844
Romulus Saunders	Democratic	NC	1844	1845
George Rathbun	Democratic	NY	1845	1847
Joseph Ingersoll	Whig	PA	1847	1849
James Thompson	Democratic	PA	1849	1851
James McLanahan	Democratic	PA	1851	1853
Frederick Stanton	Democratic	TN	1853	1855
George Simmons	Whig & Republican	NY	1855	1857
George Houston	Democratic	AL	1857	1859
John Hickman	Republican	PA	1859	1863
James Wilson	Republican	IA	1863	1869
John Bingham	Republican	OH	1869	1873
Benjamin Butler	Republican	MA	1873	1875
James Knott	Democratic	KY	1875	1881
Thomas Reed	Republican	ME	1881	1883
John Tucker	Democratic	VA	1883	1887
David Culberson	Democratic	TX	1887	1889
Ezra Taylor	Republican	OH	1889	1891
David Culberson	Democratic	TX	1891	1895
David Henderson	Republican	IA	1895	1899
George Ray	Republican	NY	1899	1903
John Jenkins	Republican	WI	1903	1909
Richard Parker	Republican	NJ	1909	1911
Henry Clayton	Democratic	AL	1911	1914
Edwin Webb	Democratic	NC	1914	1919
Andrew Volstead	Republican	MN	1919	1923
George Graham	Republican	PA	1923	1931
Hatton Sumners	Democratic	TX	1931	1947
Earl Michener	Republican	MI	1947	1949
Emanuel Celler	Democratic	NY	1949	1953
Chauncey Reed	Republican	IL	1953	1955
Emanuel Celler	Democratic	NY	1955	1973
Peter Rodino	Democratic	NJ	1973	1989
Jack Brooks	Democratic	TX	1989	1995
Henry Hyde	Republican	IL	1995	2001
Jim Sensenbrenner	Republican	WI	2001	2007
John Conyers	Democratic	MI	2007	2011
Lamar Smith	Republican	TX	2011	2013
Bob Goodlatte	Republican	VA	2013	2019
Jerry Nadler	Democratic	NY	2019	2023
Jim Jordan	Republican	OH	2023	present

Ranking members
Name	Party	State	Start	End
Emanuel Celler	Democratic	NY	1947	1949
Earl Michener	Republican	MI	1949	1951
Chauncey Reed	Republican	IL	1951	1953
Emanuel Celler	Democratic	NY	1953	1955
Chauncey Reed	Republican	IL	1955	1956
Kenneth Keating	Republican	NY	1956	1959
William McCulloch	Republican	OH	1959	1973
Edward Hutchinson	Republican	MI	1973	1977
Robert McClory	Republican	IL	1977	1983
Hamilton Fish	Republican	NY	1983	1995
John Conyers	Democratic	MI	1995	2007
Lamar Smith	Republican	TX	2007	2011
John Conyers	Democratic	MI	2011	2017
Jerry Nadler	Democratic	NY	2017	2019
Doug Collins	Republican	GA	2019	2020
Jim Jordan	Republican	OH	2020	2023
Jerry Nadler	Democratic	NY	2023	2025
Jamie Raskin	Democratic	MD	2025	present

== Historical membership rosters ==
=== 118th Congress ===
Majority	Minority
Jim Jordan, Ohio, Chair; Darrell Issa, California; Ken Buck, Colorado; Matt Gaetz, Florida; Mike Johnson, Louisiana (until October 25, 2023); Andy Biggs, Arizona; Tom McClintock, California; Tom Tiffany, Wisconsin; Thomas Massie, Kentucky; Chip Roy, Texas; Dan Bishop, North Carolina; Victoria Spartz, Indiana; Scott L. Fitzgerald, Wisconsin; Cliff Bentz, Oregon; Ben Cline, Virginia; Lance Gooden, Texas; Jeff Van Drew, New Jersey; Troy Nehls, Texas; Barry Moore, Alabama; Kevin Kiley, California; Harriet Hageman, Wyoming; Nathaniel Moran, Texas; Laurel Lee, Florida; Wesley Hunt, Texas; Russell Fry, South Carolina; Kelly Armstrong, North Dakota (from December 5, 2023)	Jerry Nadler, New York, Ranking Member; Zoe Lofgren, California; Sheila Jackson Lee, Texas (until July 19, 2024); Steve Cohen, Tennessee; Hank Johnson, Georgia; Adam Schiff, California (until November 13, 2024); David Cicilline, Rhode Island (until May 31, 2023); Eric Swalwell, California; Ted Lieu, California; Pramila Jayapal, Washington; Lou Correa, California; Mary Gay Scanlon, Pennsylvania; Joe Neguse, Colorado; Lucy McBath, Georgia; Madeleine Dean, Pennsylvania; Veronica Escobar, Texas; Deborah Ross, North Carolina; Cori Bush, Missouri; Glenn Ivey, Maryland; Becca Balint, Vermont (from June 13, 2023); Chuy García, Illinois (from September 10, 2024); Erica Lee Carter, Texas (from November 20, 2024)

Resolutions electing members: H.Res. 14 (Chair), H.Res. 15 (Ranking Member), H.Res. 70 (R), H.Res. 71 (D), H.Res. 502 (D), H.Res. 908 (R), H.Res. 1431 (García), H.Res. 1585 (Carter)

Subcommittees

Subcommittee	Chair	Ranking Member
Administrative State, Regulatory Reform and Antitrust	Thomas Massie (R-KY)	David Cicilline (D-RI) (until 5/31/23); Lou Correa (D-CA) (from 5/31/23)
The Constitution and Limited Government	Mike Johnson (R-LA) (until 10/25/23); Chip Roy (R-TX) (from 10/26/23)	Mary Gay Scanlon (D-PA)
Courts, Intellectual Property and the Internet	Darrell Issa (R-CA)	Hank Johnson (D-GA)
Crime and Federal Government Surveillance	Andy Biggs (R-AZ)	Sheila Jackson Lee (D-TX) (until 7/19/24)
Immigration Integrity, Security, and Enforcement	Tom McClintock (R-CA)	Pramila Jayapal (D-WA)
Responsiveness and Accountability to Oversight	Ben Cline (R-VA)	Eric Swalwell (D-CA)
Weaponization of the Federal Government (Select)	Jim Jordan (R-OH)	Stacey Plaskett (D-VI)

=== 117th Congress ===
Majority	Minority
Jerry Nadler, New York, Chair; Zoe Lofgren, California; Joe Neguse, Colorado; Hank Johnson, Georgia; Steve Cohen, Tennessee; David Cicilline, Rhode Island; Jamie Raskin, Maryland; Greg Stanton, Arizona; Eric Swalwell, California; Lou Correa, California; Lucy McBath, Georgia; Veronica Escobar, Texas; Ted Lieu, California; Sheila Jackson Lee, Texas; Deborah Ross, North Carolina; Pramila Jayapal, Washington; Madeleine Dean, Pennsylvania; Mary Gay Scanlon, Pennsylvania; Sylvia Garcia, Texas; Cori Bush, Missouri	Jim Jordan, Ohio, Ranking Member; Darrell Issa, California; Chip Roy, Texas; Mike Johnson, Louisiana; Tom Tiffany, Wisconsin; Tom McClintock, California; Victoria Spartz, Indiana; Matt Gaetz, Florida; Scott L. Fitzgerald, Wisconsin; Cliff Bentz, Oregon; Ken Buck, Colorado; Greg Steube, Florida; Andy Biggs, Arizona; Thomas Massie, Kentucky; Michelle Fischbach, Minnesota; Dan Bishop, North Carolina; Burgess Owens, Utah

Resolutions electing members: H.Res. 9 (Chair), H.Res. 10 (Ranking Member), H.Res. 62 (D), H.Res. 63 (R)

Subcommittees

Subcommittee	Chair	Ranking Member
Antitrust, Commercial and Administrative Law	Ken Buck (R-CO)	David Cicilline (D-RI)
The Constitution, Civil Rights and Civil Liberties	Mike Johnson (R-LA)	Steve Cohen (D-TN)
Courts, Intellectual Property and the Internet	Darrell Issa (R-CA)	Hank Johnson (D-GA)
Crime, Terrorism and Homeland Security	Andy Biggs (R-AZ)	Sheila Jackson Lee (D-TX)
Immigration and Citizenship	Tom McClintock (R-CA)	Zoe Lofgren (D-CA)
Weaponization of the Federal Government	Jim Jordan (R-OH)	TBA

=== 116th Congress ===
Majority	Minority
Jerry Nadler, New York, Chair; Zoe Lofgren, California; Sheila Jackson Lee, Texas; Steve Cohen, Tennessee; Hank Johnson, Georgia; Ted Deutch, Florida; Karen Bass, California; Cedric Richmond, Louisiana; Hakeem Jeffries, New York; David Cicilline, Rhode Island; Eric Swalwell, California; Ted Lieu, California; Jamie Raskin, Maryland; Pramila Jayapal, Washington; Val Demings, Florida; Lou Correa, California; Mary Gay Scanlon, Pennsylvania, Vice Chair; Sylvia Garcia, Texas; Joe Neguse, Colorado; Lucy McBath, Georgia; Greg Stanton, Arizona; Madeleine Dean, Pennsylvania; Debbie Mucarsel-Powell, Florida; Veronica Escobar, Texas	Jim Jordan, Ohio, Ranking Member (since March 20, 2020); Jim Sensenbrenner, Wisconsin; Steve Chabot, Ohio; Louie Gohmert, Texas; Doug Collins, Georgia, Ranking Member (until March 12, 2020); Ken Buck, Colorado; Martha Roby, Alabama; Matt Gaetz, Florida; Mike Johnson, Louisiana; Andy Biggs, Arizona; Tom McClintock, California; Debbie Lesko, Arizona; Guy Reschenthaler, Pennsylvania; Ben Cline, Virginia; Kelly Armstrong, North Dakota; Greg Steube, Florida; Tom Tiffany, Wisconsin (since July 1, 2020)

Sources: H.Res. 24 (Chair), H.Res. 25 (Ranking Member), H.Res. 46 (D), H.Res. 68 (R), H.Res. 903 (R), H.Res. 1037 (R)

Subcommittees

Subcommittee	Chair	Ranking Member
Antitrust, Commercial and Administrative Law	David Cicilline (D-RI)	Jim Sensenbrenner (R-WI)
The Constitution, Civil Rights and Civil Liberties	Steve Cohen (D-TN)	Mike Johnson (R-LA)
Courts, Intellectual Property and the Internet	Hank Johnson (D-GA)	Martha Roby (R-AL)
Crime, Terrorism and Homeland Security	Karen Bass (D-CA)	John Ratcliffe (R-TX)
Immigration and Citizenship	Zoe Lofgren (D-CA)	Ken Buck (R-CO)

=== 115th Congress ===
Majority	Minority
Bob Goodlatte, Virginia, Chair; Jim Sensenbrenner, Wisconsin; Lamar S. Smith, Texas; Steve Chabot, Ohio; Darrell Issa, California; Steve King, Iowa; Louie Gohmert, Texas; Jim Jordan, Ohio; Ted Poe, Texas; Tom Marino, Pennsylvania; Trey Gowdy, South Carolina; Raúl Labrador, Idaho; Doug Collins, Georgia; Ron DeSantis, Florida; Ken Buck, Colorado; John Ratcliffe, Texas; Martha Roby, Alabama; Matt Gaetz, Florida; Mike Johnson, Louisiana; Andy Biggs, Arizona; John Rutherford, Florida; Karen Handel, Georgia; Keith Rothfus, Pennsylvania	Jerrold Nadler, New York, Ranking Member; Zoe Lofgren, California; Sheila Jackson Lee, Texas; Steve Cohen, Tennessee; Hank Johnson, Georgia; Ted Deutch, Florida; Luis Gutiérrez, Illinois; Karen Bass, California; Cedric Richmond, Louisiana; Hakeem Jeffries, New York; David Cicilline, Rhode Island; Eric Swalwell, California; Ted Lieu, California; Jamie Raskin, Maryland, Vice Ranking Member; Pramila Jayapal, Washington; Brad Schneider, Illinois; Val Demings, Florida

Sources: H.Res. 6 (Chair), H.Res. 45 (D), H.Res. 51 (R) and H.Res. 95 (D)

=== 114th Congress ===
Majority	Minority
Bob Goodlatte, Virginia, Chair (113th); Jim Sensenbrenner, Wisconsin; Lamar S. Smith, Texas; Steve Chabot, Ohio; Darrell Issa, California; Randy Forbes, Virginia; Steve King, Iowa; Trent Franks, Arizona; Louie Gohmert, Texas; Jim Jordan, Ohio; Ted Poe, Texas; Jason Chaffetz, Utah; Tom Marino, Pennsylvania; Trey Gowdy, South Carolina; Mark Amodei, Nevada; Raúl Labrador, Idaho; Blake Farenthold, Texas; Doug Collins, Georgia; Ron DeSantis, Florida; Mimi Walters, California; Ken Buck, Colorado; John Ratcliffe, Texas; Dave Trott, Michigan; Mike Bishop, Michigan	John Conyers, Michigan, Ranking Member; Jerrold Nadler, New York; Zoe Lofgren, California; Sheila Jackson Lee, Texas; Steve Cohen, Tennessee; Hank Johnson, Georgia; Pedro Pierluisi, Puerto Rico; Judy Chu, California; Ted Deutch, Florida; Luis Gutierrez, Illinois; Karen Bass, California; Cedric Richmond, Louisiana; Suzan DelBene, Washington; Hakeem Jeffries, New York; David Cicilline, Rhode Island; Scott Peters, California

Sources:

- Resolutions electing Republican members: H.Res. 6 (Chairs) and H.Res. 17 (R)
- Resolutions electing Democratic members: H.Res. 7 (D) and H.Res. 22 (D)

=== 112th Congress ===
Majority	Minority
Lamar S. Smith, Texas, Chair; Jim Sensenbrenner, Wisconsin; Howard Coble, North Carolina; Elton Gallegly, California; Bob Goodlatte, Virginia; Dan Lungren, California; Steve Chabot, Ohio; Darrell Issa, California; Mike Pence, Indiana; Randy Forbes, Virginia; Steve King, Iowa; Trent Franks, Arizona; Louie Gohmert, Texas; Jim Jordan, Ohio; Ted Poe, Texas; Jason Chaffetz, Utah; Timothy Griffin, Arkansas; Tom Marino, Pennsylvania; Trey Gowdy, South Carolina; Dennis A. Ross, Florida; Sandy Adams, Florida; Ben Quayle, Arizona; Mark Amodei, Nevada	John Conyers, Michigan, Ranking Member; Howard Berman, California; Jerrold Nadler, New York; Bobby Scott, Virginia; Mel Watt, North Carolina; Zoe Lofgren, California; Sheila Jackson Lee, Texas; Maxine Waters, California; Steve Cohen, Tennessee; Hank Johnson, Georgia; Pedro Pierluisi, Puerto Rico; Michael Quigley, Illinois; Judy Chu, California; Ted Deutch, Florida; Linda Sánchez, California; Jared Polis, Colorado

Sources:

- Resolutions electing Republican members: H.Res. 6 (Chair), H.Res. 37 (Members)
- Resolutions electing Democratic members H.Res. 7 (Ranking member), H.Res. 39 (Members)

=== 111th Congress ===
Majority	Minority
John Conyers, Michigan, Chair; Howard Berman, California; Rick Boucher, Virginia; Jerrold Nadler, New York; Bobby Scott, Virginia; Mel Watt, North Carolina; Zoe Lofgren, California; Sheila Jackson Lee, Texas; Maxine Waters, California; Bill Delahunt, Massachusetts; Steve Cohen, Tennessee; Hank Johnson, Georgia; Pedro Pierluisi, Puerto Rico; Michael Quigley, Illinois; Judy Chu, California; Ted Deutch, Florida; Luis Gutierrez, Illinois; Tammy Baldwin, Wisconsin; Charles Gonzalez, Texas; Anthony Weiner, New York; Adam Schiff, California; Linda Sánchez, California; Daniel Maffei, New York; Jared Polis, Colorado	Lamar S. Smith, Texas, Ranking Member; Jim Sensenbrenner, Wisconsin; Howard Coble, North Carolina; Elton Gallegly, California; Bob Goodlatte, Virginia; Dan Lungren, California; Darrell Issa, California; Randy Forbes, Virginia; Steve King, Iowa; Trent Franks, Arizona; Louie Gohmert, Texas; Jason Chaffetz, Utah; Tom Rooney, Florida; Gregg Harper, Mississippi

== Task forces ==
=== Antitrust Task Force: 108th Congress ===
Chair: Jim Sensenbrenner (R-WI); Ranking member: John Conyers (D-MI)

The Antitrust Task Force during the 108th Congress existed from March 26, 2003, to September 26, 2003. All Judiciary Committee members also served as members of the Task Force, and conducted hearings and investigations into consolidation of the Bell Telephone Companies.

=== Antitrust Task Force: 110th Congress ===
Chair: John Conyers (D-MI); Ranking member: Steve Chabot (R-OH)

The Antitrust Task Force during the 110th Congress was established February 28, 2007, as a temporary subcommittee to examine the pending merger between XM Radio and Sirius Satellite Radio. The task force operated like any other subcommittee, except that it only has a six-month term. House Rules limit each full committee to just five subcommittees, and any task force, special subcommittee, or other subunit of a standing committee that is established for a cumulative period longer than six months in a Congress counts against that total. A longer term for the task force would cause the Judiciary Committee to exceed this limit.

=== Judicial Impeachment: 110th and 111th Congresses ===
Chair: Adam Schiff (D-CA) Ranking member: Bob Goodlatte (R-VA)

Established in September 2008, the Judicial Task force on Judicial Impeachment was to look into charges against district judge Thomas Porteous. The investigation was not completed by the end of the 110th Congress, and it was reestablished after the 111th Congress convened in January 2009. The responsibilities of the Task Force were expanded to include the case of Judge Samuel B. Kent, leading to hearings and his subsequent impeachment by the full House of Representatives. The task force finally voted to impeach Porteous on January 21, 2010.

== Projects ==
- Administrative Law, Process and Procedure Project (2005–2006)

== Hearings ==
- The Use and Misuse of Presidential Clemency Power for Executive Branch Officials (hearing) (2007)
- "Equal Justice for Our Military Act of 2009, HR 569 (111th Congress) (2009)" (PDF). gpo.gov. Archived from the original (PDF) on June 11, 2011.. Congress holds a hearing to consider granting members of the U.S. Armed Forces access to the Supreme Court of the United States.

== See also ==
- List of United States House of Representatives committees
- United States congressional committee
- United States Senate Committee on the Judiciary
