= Congressional Taiwan Caucus =

U.S. Congress Taiwan relations group

- Republican Co-Chairs: Rep. Mario Díaz-Balart (R-FL) and Rep. Andy Barr (R-KY)
- Democratic Co-Chair: Rep. Ami Bera (D-CA)
- Political position: Bipartisan
- Seats in the House: 114 / 435

The Congressional Taiwan Caucus is a Congressional Member Organization in the United States Congress with 114 members. The caucus focuses exclusively on improving US–Taiwan relations.

Its counterpart in the Senate is the Senate Taiwan Caucus.

== History ==
The caucus was founded on April 9, 2002. Congressmen Sherrod Brown (D-OH), Steve Chabot (R-OH), Dana Rohrabacher (R-CA), and Robert Wexler (D-FL) were the founding co-chairs.

== Members ==
Congressional Taiwan Caucus in the 118th United States Congress

There is no official source available to the public regarding the accurate list of the caucus. According to public information including news reports, these Congressional members are in the caucus:

=== Current ===
- Rep. Mario Díaz-Balart (R) (FL-25) Co-Chair
- Rep. Andy Barr (R) (KY-6) Co-Chair
- Rep. Ami Bera (D) (CA-6) Co-Chair
- Rep. Rick Allen (R) (GA-12)
- Rep. Don Bacon (R) (NE-2)
- Rep. Troy Balderson (R) (OH-12)
- Rep. Nanette Barragán (D) (CA-44)
- Rep. Andy Biggs (R) (AZ-5)
- Rep. Gus Bilirakis (R) (FL-12)
- Rep. Sanford Bishop (D) (GA-2)
- Rep. Suzanne Bonamici (D) (OR-1)
- Rep. Brendan Boyle (D) (PA-2)
- Rep. Ken Calvert (R) (CA-42)
- Rep. Salud Carbajal (D) (CA-24)
- Rep. André D. Carson (D) (IL-7)
- Rep. John Carter (R) (TX-31)
- Rep. Ed Case (D) (HI-1)
- Rep. Joaquin Castro (D) (TX-20)
- Rep. Sheila Cherfilus-McCormick (D) (FL-20)
- Rep. Judy Chu (D) (CA-27)
- Rep. Katherine Clark (D) (MA-5)
- Rep. Michael Cloud (R) (TX-27)
- Rep. Tom Cole (R) (OK-4)
- Rep. Bonnie Watson Coleman (D) (NJ-12)
- Rep. Gerald E. Connolly (D) (VA-11)
- Rep. Jim Costa (D) (CA-16)
- Rep. Angie Craig (D) (CA-4)
- Rep. Rick Crawford (R) (MN-2)
- Rep. Danny Davis (D) (IL-7)
- Rep. Suzan DelBene (D) (WA-1)
- Rep. Scott DesJarlais (R) (TN-4)
- Rep. Lloyd Doggett (D) (TX-37)
- Rep. Tom Emmer (R) (MN-6)
- Rep. Pat Fallon (R) (TX-4)
- Rep. Brian Fitzpatrick (R) (PA-1)
- Rep. Chuck Fleischmann (R) (TN-3)
- Rep. Bill Foster (D) (IL-11)
- Rep. Virginia Foxx (R) (NC-6)
- Rep. Lois Frankel (D) (FL-21)
- Rep. Scott Franklin (R) (FL-18)
- Rep. Andrew Garbarino (R) (NY-2)
- Rep. Carlos Antonio Giménez (R) (FL-28)
- Rep. Jimmy Gomez (D) (CA-34)
- Rep. Tony Gonzales (R) (TX-23)
- Rep. Lance Gooden (R) (TX-5)
- Rep. Paul Gosar (R) (AZ-4)
- Rep. Joshua S. Gottheimer (D) (NJ-5)
- Rep. Sam Graves (R) (MO-6)
- Rep. Al Green (D) (TX-9)
- Rep. Mark Green (R) (TN-7)
- Rep. Glenn Grothman (R) (WI-6)
- Rep. Michael Guest (R) (MS-3)
- Rep. Kevin Hern (R) (OK-1)
- Rep. Jim Himes (D) (CT-4)
- Rep. Darrell Issa (R) (CA-41)
- Rep. Hakeem Jeffries (D) (NY-8)
- Rep. Hank Johnson (D) (GA-4)
- Rep. Mike Johnson (R) (LA-4)
- Rep. David Joyce (R) (OH-14)
- Rep. Marcy Kaptur (D) (OH-9)
- Rep. Bill Keating (D) (MA-9)
- Rep. Mike Kelly (R) (PA-16)
- Rep. Ro Khanna (D) (CA-17)
- Rep. Nicholas Langworthy (R) (NY-23)
- Rep. Rick Larsen (D) (WA-2)
- Rep. John Larson (D) (CT-1)
- Rep. Young Kim (R) (CA-39)
- Rep. Nick LaLota (R) (NY-1)
- Rep. Robert E. Latta (R) (OH-5)
- Rep. Mike Lawler (R) (NY-17)
- Rep. Mike Levin (D) (CA-49)
- Rep. Ted Lieu (D) (CA-33)
- Rep. Zoe Lofgren (D) (CA-19)
- Rep. Barry Loudermilk (R) (GA-11)
- Rep. Frank Lucas (R) (OK-3)
- Rep. Nicole Malliotakis (R) (NY-11)
- Rep. Brian Mast (R) (FL-21)
- Rep. Doris Matsui (D) (CA-7)
- Rep. Michael McCaul (R) (TX-10)
- Rep. Jim McGovern (D) (MA-2)
- Rep. Patrick McHenry (R) (NC-10)
- Rep. Lisa McClain (R) (MI-09)
- Rep. Tom McClintock (R) (CA-5)
- Rep. Gregory Meeks (D) (NY-5)
- Rep. Grace Meng (D) (NY-6)
- Rep. Mariannette Miller-Meeks (R) (IA-1)
- Rep. Alex Mooney (R) (WV-2)
- Rep. Joe Morelle (D) (NY-25)
- Rep. Seth Moulton (D) (MA-6)
- Rep. Greg Murphy (R) (NC-3)
- Rep. Richard Neal (D) (MA-1)
- Rep. Jay Obernolte (R) (CA-23)
- Rep. Andy Ogles (R) (TN-5)
- Rep. Frank Pallone Jr. (D) (NJ-6)
- Rep. Scott Perry (R) (PA-10)
- Rep. Scott Peters (D) (CA-52)
- Rep. Mike Quigley (D) (IL-5)
- Rep. Jamie Raskin (D) (MD-8)
- Rep. Mike Rogers (R) (AL-3)
- Rep. John Rose (R) (TN-6)
- Rep. David Rouzer (R) (NC-7)
- Rep. Andrea Salinas (D) (OR-6)
- Rep. Linda Sánchez (D) (CA-38)
- Rep. Mary Gay Scanlon (D) (PA-5)
- Rep. David Schweikert (R) (AZ-6)
- Rep. Austin Scott (R) (GA-8)
- Rep. Pete Sessions (R) (TX-17)
- Rep. Brad Sherman (D) (CA-30)
- Rep. Mike Simpson (R) (ID-2)
- Rep. Adam Smith (D) (WA-9)
- Rep. Chris Smith (R) (NJ-4)
- Rep. Elise Stefanik (R) (NY-21)
- Rep. Greg Steube (R) (FL-17)
- Rep. Glenn Thompson (R) (PA-15)
- Rep. Mike Thompson (D) (CA-4)
- Rep. Tom Tiffany (R) (WI-7)
- Rep. Dina Titus (D) (NV-1)
- Rep. Jill Tokuda (D) (HI-2)
- Rep. Paul Tonko (D) (NY-20)
- Rep. Lori Trahan (D) (MA-3)
- Rep. Mike Turner (R) (OH-10)
- Rep. Marc Veasey (D) (TX-33)
- Rep. Ann Wagner (R) (MO-2)
- Rep. Tim Walberg (R) (MI-7)
- Rep. Mike Waltz (R) (FL-6)
- Rep. Debbie Wasserman Schultz (D) (FL-23)
- Rep. Bruce Westerman (R) (AR-4)
- Rep. Frederica Wilson (D) (FL-24)
- Rep. Joe Wilson (R) (SC-2)
- Rep. Steve Womack (R) (AR-3)

=== Former ===
- Rep. Jim Banks (R) (IN-3)
- Rep. Jack Bergman (R) (MI-1)
- Fmr. Rep. Mo Brooks (R) (AL-5) Retired at end of 117th Congress.
- Fmr. Rep. Corrine Brown (D) (FL-5)- Lost 2016 election
- Fmr. Rep. Ken Buck (R) (CO-4)
- Fmr. Rep. Michael C. Burgess (R) (TX-26)
- Fmr. Rep. Matt Cartwright (D) (PA-8)
- Fmr. Rep. Steve Chabot (R) (OH-1) Former Co-Chair
- Fmr. Rep. John Curtis (R) (UT-3)
- Rep. Gerry Connolly (D) (VA-11) Former Co-Chair. Died May 21, 2025 (aged 75)
- Rep. Tom Cotton (R-AR) - now Senator
- Rep. Elijah Cummings (D) (MD)
- Fmr. Rep. Ted Deutch (D) (FL-22) Retired at end of 117th Congress
- Fmr. Rep. Anna Eshoo (D) (CA-18)
- Fmr. Rep. Drew Ferguson (R) (GA-3)
- Fmr. Rep. Kay Granger (R) (TX-12)
- Fmr. Rep. Garret Graves (R) (LA-6)
- Fmr. Rep. Vicky Hartzler (R) (MO-4) Retired at end of 117th Congress
- Fmr. Rep. Jaime Herrera Beutler (R) (WA-3) Lost renomination in 2022
- Fmr. Rep. Jody Hice (R) (GA-10) Retired at end of 117th Congress
- Fmr. Rep. Bill Johnson (R) (OH-6)
- Fmr. Rep. Eddie Bernice Johnson (D) (TX-30) Retired at end of 117th Congress
- Fmr. Rep. Walter B. Jones Jr. (R-NC)
- Fmr. Rep. Adam Kinzinger (R) (IL-16) Retired at end of 117th Congress
- Fmr. Rep. Doug Lamborn (R) (CO-5)
- Fmr. Rep. Jim Langevin (D) (RI-2) Retired at end of 117th Congress
- Fmr. Rep. Debbie Lesko (R) (AZ-8)
- Rep. Sheila Jackson Lee (D) (TX-18)
- Fmr. Rep. Blaine Luetkemeyer (R) (MO-3)
- Fmr. Rep. Carolyn Maloney (D) (NY-12)
- Fmr. Rep. Sean Maloney (D) (NY-18)
- Rep. Markwayne Mullin (R) (OK-2)
- Fmr. Rep. Grace Napolitano (D) (CA-32)
- Rep. Donald Payne Jr. (D) (NJ-10)
- Fmr. Rep. Katie Porter (D) (CA-45)
- Fmr. Rep. David Price (D) (NC-4) Retired at end of 117th Congress
- Fmr. Rep. Kathleen Rice (D) (NY-4) Retired at end of 117th Congress
- Fmr. Rep. Tom Rice (R) (SC-7) Lost renomination in 2022
- Rep. Ed Royce (R-CA)
- Fmr. Rep. Tim Ryan (D) (OH-13) Retired at end of 117th Congress
- Fmr. Rep. Adam Schiff (D) (CA-28)
- Rep. Kurt Schrader (D) (OR-5) Lost renomination in 2022
- Fmr. Rep. Albio Sires (D) (NJ-8) Co-Chair Retired at end of 117th Congress
- Fmr. Rep. Jackie Speier (D) (CA-14) Retired at end of 117th Congress
- Fmr. Rep. Mike Turner (R) (OH-10)
- Fmr. Rep. Chris Van Hollen (D-MD) - now Senator since 2017
- Rep. Jackie Walorski (R) (IN-2)
- Fmr. Rep. Mimi Walters (R) CA-45)
- Rep. David Scott (D) (GA-13)
