= Zoe Lofgren =

American politician and lawyer (born 1947)

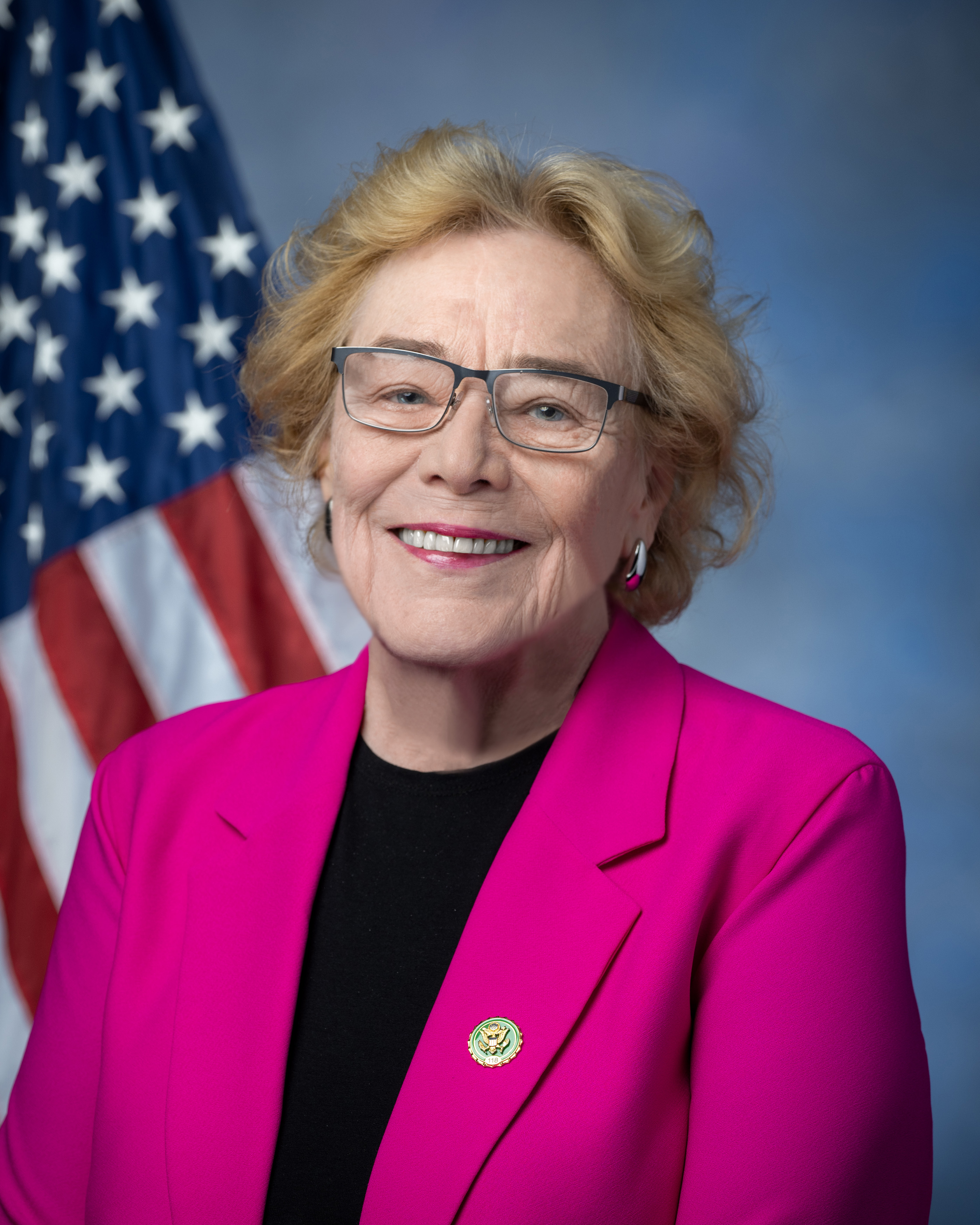
- Official portrait, 2024

Ranking Member of the House Science Committee
- Incumbent
- Assumed office January 3, 2023
- Preceded by: Frank Lucas

Chair of the House Administration Committee
- In office January 3, 2019 – January 3, 2023
- Preceded by: Gregg Harper
- Succeeded by: Bryan Steil

Chair of the House Ethics Committee
- In office January 3, 2009 – January 3, 2011
- Preceded by: Gene Green (acting)
- Succeeded by: Jo Bonner

Member of the U.S. House of Representatives from California
- Incumbent
- Assumed office January 3, 1995
- Preceded by: Don Edwards
- Constituency: 16th district (1995–2013); 19th district (2013–2023); 18th district (2023–present)

Personal details
- Born: Susan Ellen Lofgren; December 21, 1947 (age 78) San Mateo, California, U.S.
- Party: Democratic
- Spouse: John Collins (m. 1978)
- Children: 2
- Education: Stanford University (BA); Santa Clara University (JD)
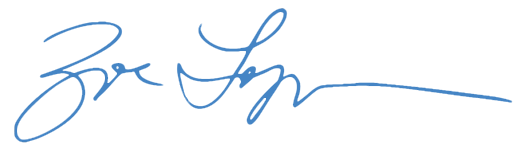
- Signature
- Website: House website Campaign website
- Lofgren's voice Lofgren supporting the DISCLOSE Act of 2010, a campaign finance reform bill Recorded June 24, 2010

Susan Ellen "Zoe" Lofgren (/ˈzoʊ ˈlɒfɡrɪn/ ZOH LOF-grin; born December 21, 1947) is an American politician and lawyer serving as a U.S. representative from California. A member of the Democratic Party, Lofgren is in her 16th term in Congress, having been first elected in 1994. Lofgren has long served on the House Judiciary Committee, and chaired the House Administration Committee in the 116th and 117th Congresses.

Lofgren was the 16th district's first female U.S. representative, before part of the district was redistricted into the 19th congressional district. She currently represents the 18th district, which covers much of Santa Clara County, including Gilroy, Morgan Hill, and most of San Jose. Representing a district covering much of Silicon Valley, Lofgren has been noted for her activity in tech-related policy areas such as net neutrality and digital surveillance.

== Early life, education and career ==
Lofgren was born in San Mateo, California, the daughter of Mary Violet, a school cafeteria employee, and Milton R. Lofgren, a beer truck driver. Her grandfather was Swedish. Lofgren attended Gunn High School (1966) in Palo Alto, and while in high school, Lofgren was a member of the Junior State of America, a student-run political debate, activism, and student governance organization. She earned her B.A. degree in political science from Stanford University in 1970 and her Juris Doctor degree from Santa Clara University School of Law in 1975.

After graduating from Stanford, Lofgren worked as a staffer for Congressman Don Edwards. She served on the House Judiciary Committee when the committee prepared articles of impeachment against President Richard Nixon in 1973.

In 1978, Lofgren married John Marshall Collins. Returning to San Jose, she worked in Don Edwards's district office while earning her J.D. degree. After two years as partner at a San Jose immigration law firm, she was elected to the board of San Jose City College. In 1981, she was elected to the Santa Clara County Board of Supervisors, representing downtown San Jose and nearby communities, where she served for 13 years.

== U.S. House of Representatives ==
=== Elections ===
In 1994, Lofgren entered a six-way Democratic primary in what was then the 16th district, when Edwards retired after 32 years in Congress. The district, then as now, is a Democratic stronghold, and it was understood that whoever won the Democratic primary would be only the second person to represent this district since its creation in 1963 (it was numbered as the 9th district from 1963 to 1975, as the 10th from 1975 to 1993, the 16th from 1993 to 2013, and has been the 19th since 2013). A decided underdog, she managed to defeat the favorite, former San Jose mayor Tom McEnery, by just over 1,100 votes. She breezed to victory in November, and has been reelected every two years since with no substantive opposition.

During the 2004, 2006 and 2008 elections, Lofgren's campaign paid approximately $350,000 to two businesses her husband operates: Collins and Day and John Marshall Collins P.C. over a six-year period to support campaign efforts.

=== Tenure ===
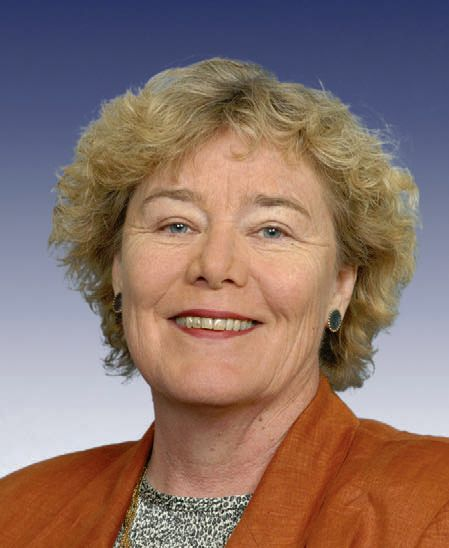
Lofgren during the 109th Congress

Lofgren chairs the 46-member California Democratic Congressional Delegation. She serves on the Judiciary Committee and chairs the House Judiciary Subcommittee on Immigration, Citizenship, Refugees, Border Security, and International Law. In 2007, she co-sponsored the Violent Radicalization and Homegrown Terrorism Prevention Act, which the ACLU characterized as "legislating against thought". In April 2011, she became the first member of Congress to call for federal investigation into the Secure Communities deportation program.

Beginning in 2009, Lofgren served as chair of the House Ethics Committee. In doing so, she presided over a rare sanction of censure, against longtime member Charles B. Rangel. In 2009, Lofgren was appointed and served as an impeachment manager in the impeachment trial of Judge Samuel B. Kent. In 2010, Lofgren was appointed and served as an impeachment manager (prosecutor) in the impeachment trial of Judge Thomas Porteous.

In the Stop Online Piracy Act House Judiciary Committee hearings, she defended the current state of the internet in opposition of the bill. She has also opposed the data retention requirements in the H.R. 1981 (the Protecting Children from Internet Pornographers Act of 2011).

In February 2013, Lofgren became one of the sponsors of the Fair Access to Science and Technology Research Act to expedite open access to taxpayer-funded research.

In May 2016, Lofgren was publicly reprimanded during a House Judiciary Committee hearing after calling witness Gail Heriot of the United States Commission on Civil Rights an "ignorant bigot" because Heriot's written testimony before the hearing had suggested that calling oneself a female does not cause one to be a female. Following the oral warning from acting committee chairman Steve King, Lofgren responded, "I cannot allow that kind of bigotry to go into the record unchallenged".

In January 2020, Lofgren was selected as one of seven impeachment managers who presented the impeachment case against President Donald Trump during his first trial before the United States Senate. This marked her third time serving as an impeachment manager.

As of October 2021, Lofgren had voted in line with Joe Biden's stated position 100% of the time.

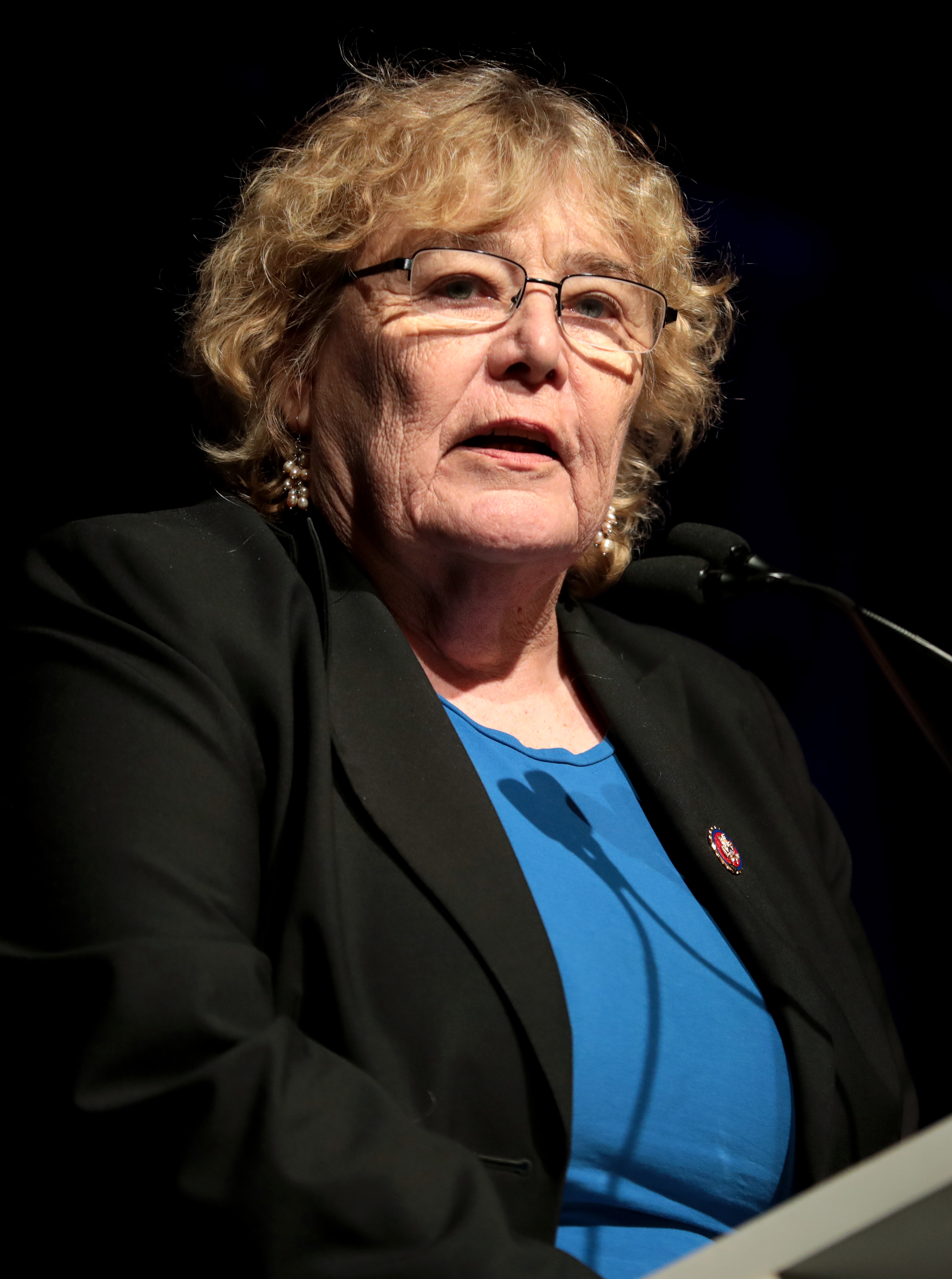
Lofgren speaking to the California Democratic Party State Convention in June 2019

=== Committee assignments ===
For the 119th Congress:

- Committee on Science, Space, and Technology (Ranking Member)
  - As Ranking Member of the committee, Rep. Lofgren is entitled to sit as an ex officio member in all subcommittee meetings, per the committee's rules.
- Committee on the Judiciary
  - Subcommittee on Courts, Intellectual Property, and the Internet
  - Subcommittee on Immigration Integrity, Security, and Enforcement
  - Subcommittee on the Administrative State, Regulatory Reform, and Antitrust

=== Caucuses ===
- Congressional Asian Pacific American Caucus (Associate member, former)
- Congressional Progressive Caucus (former)
- Congressional Arts Caucus
- Congressional Equality Caucus
- Afterschool Caucuses
- Congressional NextGen 9-1-1 Caucus
- Congressional Solar Caucus
- Congressional Taiwan Caucus
- Congressional Freethought Caucus
- Congressional Wildlife Refuge Caucus
- Medicare for All Caucus
- Congressional Coalition on Adoption
- Rare Disease Caucus

== Political positions ==
=== Abortion ===
Lofgren is pro-choice and has a 100% rating from NARAL Pro-Choice America, an organization that advocates for abortion rights and tracks congressional records on the topic. In 2013, she was chosen as the lead House Democrat to argue against the Pain-Capable Unborn Child Protection Act, which would have banned abortions after the mother was 20 weeks pregnant. Lofgren said, "Passage of the bill is wrong. It's the wrong policy for the freedom of American women." She opposed the overturning of Roe v. Wade, calling it "a bleak day" and vowing to keep abortion safe and accessible in California.

=== Tech policy ===
Lofgren, whose district covers much of Silicon Valley, has been noted for her activity in tech industry regulation and privacy policy. In 2012, she was one of two Democrats in Congress to oppose the Federal Trade Commission's (FTC) then-ongoing antitrust probe of Google. Lofgren criticized the European Commission's decision to fine Google $2.7 billion in 2017 over alleged anti-competitive behavior, arguing that the fine was "unfair to the U.S. companies participating in European markets".

In 2013, in the wake of the prosecution and subsequent suicide of Internet activist Aaron Swartz (who used a script to download scholarly research articles in excess of what JSTOR terms of service allowed), Lofgren introduced a bill, Aaron's Law (H.R. 2454, S. 1196) to exclude terms of service violations from the 1986 Computer Fraud and Abuse Act and from the wire fraud statute. By May 2014, Aaron's Law had stalled in committee. Brian Knappenberger, author of a documentary on Swartz, alleges this occurred due to Oracle Corporation's financial interest in maintaining the status quo.

In 2021, Lofgren opposed a series of bipartisan proposals aiming to "break up" Big Tech companies through antitrust enforcement. Alongside a group of other members of the California congressional delegation, she criticized the "antitrust package" due to concerns about its impact on the U.S. tech industry. Following allegations that Lofgren's opposition to antitrust measures were potentially influenced by her daughter's employment as a corporate counsel for Google, Lofgren was defended by colleagues Ro Khanna and Anna Eshoo, who called these criticisms "ad hominem attacks".

In 2022, Lofgren was one of 16 Democrats to vote against the Merger Filing Fee Modernization Act of 2021, an antitrust package that would crack down on corporations for anti-competitive behavior.

In 2025, Lofgren introduced the Foreign Anti‑Digital Piracy Act (FADPA), which establishes a procedure allowing copyright owners and exclusive licensees to ask U.S. district courts to require internet providers to block access to foreign websites or online services that are alleged to facilitate copyright infringement.

=== Energy policy ===
Lofgren has routinely voted for bills that would expand renewable energy investments. She believes that a clean energy infrastructure is required to curb the effects of climate change. In 2018, Lofgren co-sponsored the Nuclear Energy Innovation Capabilities Act. In February 2019, she co-sponsored the Green New Deal resolution (H.Res. 109).

=== Health care ===
Lofgren is a member of the Medicare for All Caucus and co-sponsored the legislation introduced by Representative John Conyers in 2017. She rescinded her sponsorship of a similar bill introduced by Representative Pramila Jayapal in 2019, arguing that the bill's two-year timeline was not feasible. Lofgren continues to support a public option for health insurance, and 2021 co-sponsored Jayapal's bill to lower the Medicare eligibility age from 65 to 60.

=== Net neutrality ===
Lofgren is a supporter of net neutrality policies to prevent internet service providers (ISPs) from engaging in data discrimination. In 2018, she signed a discharge petition to force a vote on net neutrality protections in Congress.

=== 2024 presidential nominee ===
On July 19, 2024, Lofgren called for Joe Biden to withdraw from the 2024 United States presidential election.

== Personal life ==
In 1978, Lofgren married John Marshall Collins, an attorney. The couple met at an election party. They have two children and twin grandsons. Lofgren's daughter, Sheila Collins, is a corporate counsel at Google.

== Electoral history ==
Electoral history of Zoe Lofgren
Year	Office		Party	Primary			General			Result	Swing	Ref.
Year	Office		Party	Total	%	P.	Total	%	P.	Result	Swing	Ref.
1994	U.S. House	16th	Democratic	16,168	45.3	1st	74,935	65	1st	Won	Hold	
1996	U.S. House	16th	Democratic	37,224	100	1st	94,020	65.65	1st	Won	Hold	
1998	U.S. House	16th	Democratic	58,947	100	1st	85,503	72.82	1st	Won	Hold	
2000	U.S. House	16th	Democratic	72,515	100	1st	115,118	72.1	1st	Won	Hold	
2002	U.S. House	16th	Democratic	34,247	100	1st	72,370	67.1	1st	Won	Hold	
2004	U.S. House	16th	Democratic	50,254	100	1st	129,222	70.9	1st	Won	Hold	
2006	U.S. House	16th	Democratic	46,286	100	1st	98,929	72.8	1st	Won	Hold	
2008	U.S. House	16th	Democratic	39,616	100	1st	146,481	71.3	1st	Won	Hold	
2010	U.S. House	16th	Democratic	48,757	100	1st	105,841	67.9	1st	Won	Hold	
2012	U.S. House	19th	Democratic	60,726	65.2	1st	162,300	73.2	1st	Won	Hold	
2014	U.S. House	19th	Democratic	63,845	76	1st	85,888	67.2	1st	Won	Hold	
2016	U.S. House	19th	Democratic	107,773	76.1	1st	181,802	73.9	1st	Won	Hold	
2018	U.S. House	19th	Democratic	97,096	99	1st	162,496	73.8	1st	Won	Hold	
2020	U.S. House	19th	Democratic	104,456	62.7	1st	224,385	71.7	1st	Won	Hold	
2022	U.S. House	18th	Democratic	50,104	56.1	1st	99,677	65.8	1st	Won	Hold	
2024	U.S. House	18th	Democratic	49,370	51.2	1st	147,674	64.4	1st	Won	Hold	
2026	U.S. House	18th	Democratic	65,291	54.86	1st	TBD					
Source: Secretary of State of California | Statewide Election Results

== Publications ==
=== Articles ===
- Congress hands China another win, The Hill, March 22, 2024

== See also ==
- PROTECT IP Act
- Aaron's Law
- Women in the United States House of Representatives

U.S. House of Representatives
Preceded by Don Edwards	Member of the U.S. House of Representatives from California's 16th congressional district 1995–2013	Succeeded by Jim Costa
Preceded by Gene Green; Acting	Chair of the House Ethics Committee; 2009–2011	Succeeded by Jo Bonner
Preceded by Jo Bonner	Ranking Member of the House Ethics Committee; 2011	Succeeded by Linda Sánchez
Preceded by Jeff Denham	Member of the U.S. House of Representatives from California's 19th congressional district 2013–2023	Succeeded by Jimmy Panetta
Preceded by Gregg Harper	Chair of the House Administration Committee; 2019–2023	Succeeded by Bryan Steil
Preceded by Roy Blunt	Chair of the Joint Printing Committee; 2019–2021	Succeeded by Amy Klobuchar
Preceded by Roy Blunt	Chair of the Joint Library Committee; 2021–2023	Succeeded by Amy Klobuchar
Preceded by Anna Eshoo	Member of the U.S. House of Representatives from California's 18th congressional district 2023–present	Incumbent
Preceded by Frank Lucas	Ranking Member of the House Science Committee; 2023–present	Incumbent
U.S. order of precedence (ceremonial)
Preceded by Lloyd Doggett	United States representatives by seniority 19th	Succeeded by Robert Aderholt
Preceded by Lloyd Doggett	Order of precedence of the United States	Succeeded by Jim McGovern
