= Hank Johnson =

American politician (born 1954)

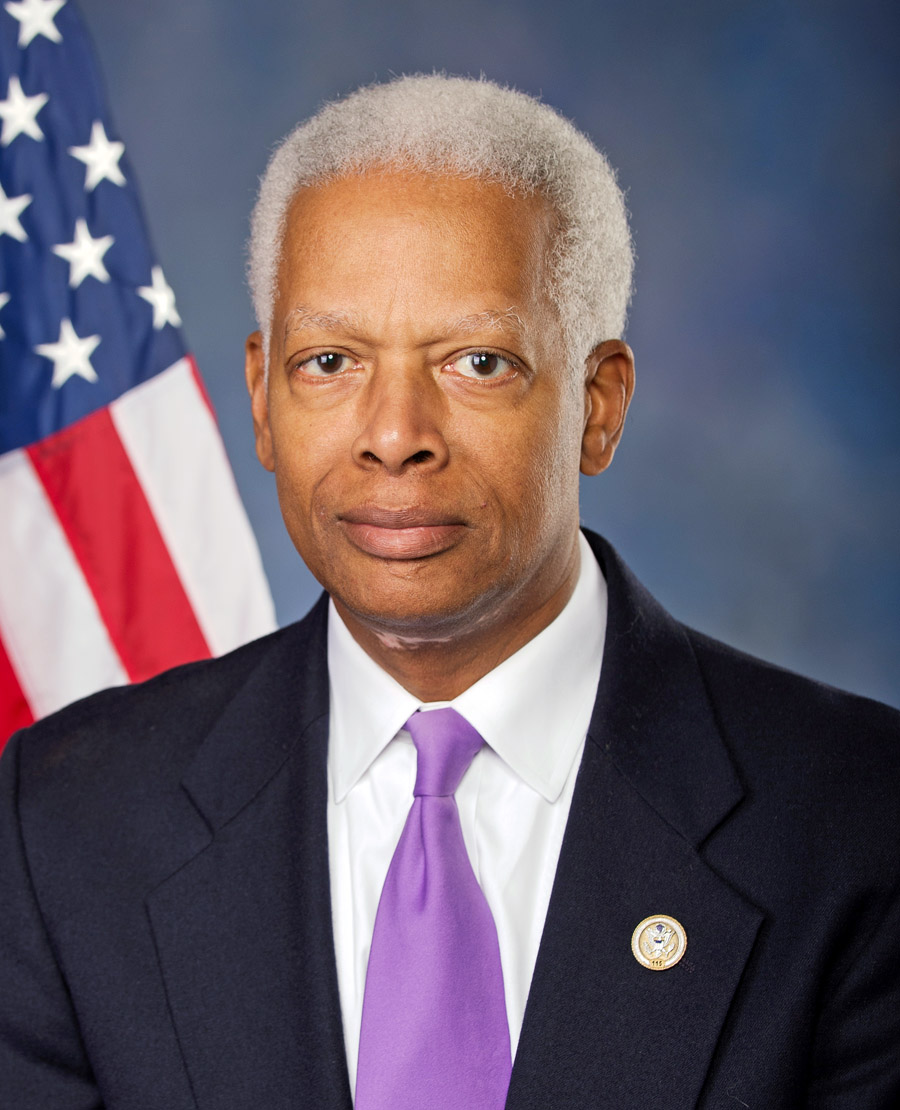
- Official portrait, 2017

Member of the U.S. House of Representatives from Georgia's 4th district
- Incumbent
- Assumed office January 3, 2007
- Preceded by: Cynthia McKinney

Personal details
- Born: Henry Calvin Johnson Jr. October 2, 1954 (age 72) Washington, D.C., U.S.
- Party: Democratic
- Spouse: Mereda Davis (m. 1979)
- Children: 2
- Education: Clark Atlanta University (BA); Texas Southern University (JD)
- Website: House website Campaign website
- Johnson's voice Johnson supporting the Bulletproof Vest Partnership grant program Recorded May 14, 2019

Henry Calvin Johnson Jr. (born October 2, 1954) is an American lawyer and politician serving as the U.S. representative for Georgia's 4th congressional district since 2007. He is a member of the Democratic Party. The district is anchored in Atlanta's inner eastern suburbs, including the majority of DeKalb County—which encompasses Decatur, Lithonia, Stone Mountain, Dunwoody, Brookhaven, and Doraville—as well as parts of Gwinnett County, including Peachtree Corners, Lawrenceville, Duluth, and Norcross, along with a small portion of the city of Atlanta.

== Life, education, and career ==
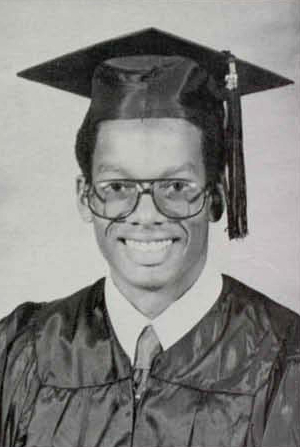
Johnson in the Clark College yearbook, 1976

Johnson grew up in Washington, D.C. His father worked for the Bureau of Prisons and was the director of classifications and paroles. Up to that time, he was the highest ranking African-American in the bureau.

Johnson received his Bachelor of Arts degree from Clark College (now Clark Atlanta University) in 1976, where he joined the Kappa Alpha Alpha chapter of Omega Psi Phi, Decatur, Georgia. He received his Juris Doctor from the Texas Southern University Thurgood Marshall School of Law in Houston in 1979, and practiced law in Decatur, Georgia, for more than 25 years.

From 1989 to 2001, Johnson served as an associate judge of the DeKalb County magistrate's court. He was elected to the DeKalb County Commission in 2000 and served from 2001 to 2006.

== U.S. House of Representatives ==
=== Elections ===
==== 2006 ====
In 2006, Johnson challenged Representative Cynthia McKinney in the Democratic primary for the 4th district—the real contest in this heavily Democratic, black-majority district. He forced McKinney into a runoff by holding her under 50% in the July 18 primary: McKinney got 47.1% of the vote; Johnson 44.4%, and a third candidate 8.5%.

In the August 8 runoff, although there were about 8,000 more voters, McKinney got about the same number of votes as in the July primary. Johnson won with 41,178 votes (59%) to McKinney's 28,832 (41%).

On October 6, 2006, Congressional Quarterly's "On Their Way", which features promising candidates soon to arrive in Washington, featured Johnson.

In November, Johnson defeated the Republican nominee, Catherine Davis, with 76% of the vote—one of the largest percentages for a Democrat in a contested election, and the largest in the district's history. But he had effectively assured himself of a seat in Congress by winning the primary: with a Cook Partisan Voting Index of D+22, the 4th was the second-most Democratic district in Georgia (only the neighboring 5th, covering most of Atlanta, was more Democratic).

Johnson made aggressive use of the internet to court supporters and attract national attention to his primary challenge to McKinney. The National Journal wrote that of all congressional candidates nationwide in 2006, "Johnson had the most unique blog strategy by far." The National Journal ranked Johnson's use of the internet to defeat McKinney—and the broader trend of challengers using the blogosphere to challenge entrenched incumbents—as the third most significant blog-related story of 2006. Johnson was the first congressional candidate invited to blog for The Hill's Congress Blog, typically reserved for members of Congress. "I'm tremendously excited about the opportunity to use this unique medium to strengthen democracy by increasing open interaction between constituents and candidates," Johnson wrote. "I hope to provide you with an inside view of this hotly-contested, high stakes runoff."

==== 2008 ====
Johnson was unopposed for reelection in 2008, winning 99.9% of the vote against write-in candidates Loren Christopher Collins, Faye Coffield and Jacob Perasso.

On July 30, 2007, Johnson was the first Democratic congressman in Georgia to publicly endorse Barack Obama in the 2008 Democratic presidential primary.

==== 2010 ====
Johnson was reelected over the Republican nominee, business owner Liz Carter, receiving 131,760 of 176,467 votes, or 74.67%. Carter, who is white, made headlines during the campaign by maintaining that she had been initially barred from appearing at a candidate forum hosted by Newsmakers Journal due to her race, an assertion the forum's organizers denied.

In 2010, Johnson suggested before a House Armed Services Committee hearing that relocating Navy personnel to Guam could cause the small island to “become so overly populated that it will tip over and capsize”, a claim that has since haunted his public image and is often used to discredit him.

==== 2012–present ====
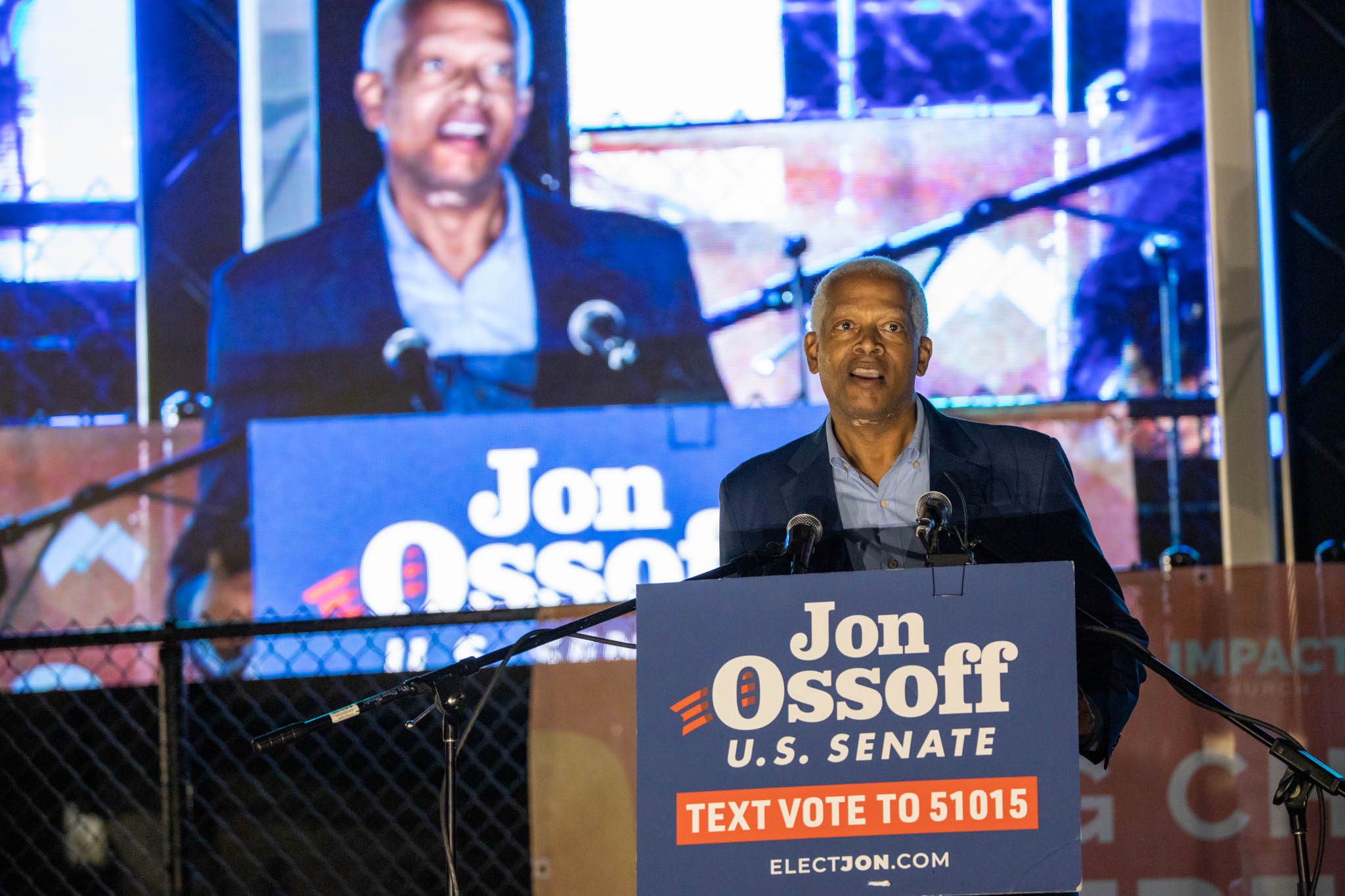
Johnson speaking at a campaign rally for Jon Ossoff on November 10, 2020

Johnson was re-elected in an uncontested election in 2012 and 2014.

He won reelection over Republican Victor Armendariz in 2016, over Republican Joe Profit in 2018, over Republican Johsie Ezammudeen in 2020, over Republican Jonathan Chavez in 2022, and over Republican Eugene Yu in 2024.

=== Tenure ===
On November 18, 2008, the Democratic Caucus elected Johnson Regional Whip for the Eighth Region (GA, FL, MS, AL, U.S. Virgin Islands).

==== Iraq War ====
On January 25, 2007, Johnson responded to President George W. Bush's State of the Union address by criticizing the war in Iraq, saying, "This war has proven to be one of the gravest missteps in the recent history of our country. It is time for President Bush to face the music and respond to the urgent demands of a frustrated country."

On February 8, 2007, Johnson introduced his first bill: a resolution requesting that Defense Secretary Robert Gates take U.S. troops off of street patrol duty in Iraq. "There is no military solution for the civil war in Iraq", Johnson said. "It is time for Iraqi troops, who have been trained, to assume responsibility for patrolling their own streets. Clearly, deploying our troops this way has only escalated the number of U.S. casualties, and this must stop". According to the Atlanta Journal-Constitution, Johnson's resolution was "interesting in that it goes beyond broad directives and proposes something very specific".

On March 23, 2007, Johnson voted to pass H.R. 1591 and attracted attention by blogging about his decision to vote for it. H.R. 1591 passed the House on March 23, 2007, and the Senate on April 26, but Bush, citing the Iraqi withdrawal timeline among the many particulars as being unacceptable, vetoed the bill on May 1; Congress tried to override the veto the next day but was unable to garner the votes. On May 24, 2007, Johnson voted to cut funding for the Iraq War unless provisions included binding requirements upon the Iraqi government. On May 25, 2007, a compromise bill, the U.S. Troop Readiness, Veterans' Care, Katrina Recovery, and Iraq Accountability Appropriations Act, 2007, was enacted.

==== Israel ====
Johnson has been a critic of Israel's occupation policies and has not altered his stance despite criticism.

On July 25, 2016, in a speech in Philadelphia before the U.S. Campaign to End the Israeli Occupation, Johnson said that the Israel occupation of the West Bank had created highways to which Palestinians are denied access, and which cut off Palestinian neighborhoods from each other; that walls and Israeli checkpoints restrict Palestinian freedom of movement; that Jewish people take homes when Palestinian residents miss spending a night there, and fly an Israeli flag, while Palestinians are not permitted to fly their own. He was also purported to have said Palestinian homes were stolen or destroyed. He added that "there is a steady [stream], almost like termites" and that "settlement activity has marched forwards with impunity".

The Anti-Defamation League cited the words as "offensive and unhelpful", as well as tweeting "demonization, dehumanization of settlers doesn't advance peace". Dov Wilker of the American Jewish Committee was reported as saying Johnson had compared Jewish Israelis to "vermin" and was using a centuries-old antisemitic trope. Rabbi David Wolpe called it an antisemitic smear and questioned Johnson's apology, writing, "'I am sorry I said something stupid and antisemitic'—that would have been a fitting apology".

Johnson apologized on Twitter for his "poor choice of words" but added that Israeli settlements were undermining the two-state solution. In a statement his office made to The Atlanta Journal-Constitution, he clarified that his termite metaphor referred to the corrosive process of settlement policies, "not the people". J Street responded to Johnson's clarification by stating there should be no place for slurs, but, in their view, Johnson was speaking of the settlement enterprise, not of individuals. Media coverage, they added, should focus on opposition to settlement growth rather than on the misrepresentations by an irresponsible media outlet.

Wilker held several meetings with Johnson to foster greater understanding and communication. In 2018, Johnson accepted his invitation to attend a vigil at Shearith Israel in the aftermath of the Pittsburgh synagogue shooting for a national initiative called #ShowUpForShabbat. In 2019, Johnson appeared at the American Jewish Committee's National Board of Governors Institute "Conversations With Congress" where the group told Johnson: "we were obviously grateful when you apologized for a previous comment a few years back that was unintentionally anti-Semitic and how you handled it so well with the Atlanta Jewish community, how can we better educate members of Congress and others about these problematic tropes."

==== Civil justice ====
Johnson has supported legislation aimed at strengthening the U.S. civil justice system. In March 2016, he and Representative John Conyers introduced legislation to protect consumers' access to civil courts, the Restoring Statutory Rights Act. The legislation would "ensure that the state, federal, and constitutional rights of Americans are enforceable" and that consumers are not forced into secretive private arbitration hearings.

==== Economic positions ====
Johnson voted against the Troubled Asset Relief Program (TARP) bailout bill in November 2008. He voted for the Recovery and Reinvestment Act of 2009, the stimulus package supported by Democrats in Congress and President Obama.

In 2007, Johnson's H.Con.Res.80, a resolution calling for peaceful resolution to the Ugandan civil war between the Government of Uganda and the Lord's Resistance Army, unanimously passed the House and Senate. His first successful piece of legislation, it was jointly introduced in the Senate by senators Russ Feingold and Sam Brownback.

==== Joe Wilson ====
In 2009, Johnson demanded censure of Representative Joe Wilson after Wilson shouted "you lie" during Obama's speech to a joint session of the 111th United States Congress on September 9, 2009, about his plan for health care reform; Johnson argued that the comment had an unseen racial undertone and that, if Wilson was not formally rebuked, "we will have people with white hoods running through the countryside again".

==== Comments on Guam tipping over ====
During a March 25, 2010, House Armed Services Committee hearing about the U.S. military installation in Guam, Johnson said to Admiral Robert F. Willard, Commander of U.S. Pacific Command, "My fear is that the whole island will become so overly populated that it will tip over and capsize", to which Willard replied, "We don't anticipate that." The next day, Johnson's office said that he was tremendously deadpan and had used a facetious metaphor to draw attention to the potential negative impact of adding 8,000 Marines and dependents to an island of 180,000 people.

==== Effectiveness in Congress ====
In 2014, Johnson was named the 18th most effective Democrat in the 112th Congress according to a study by Vanderbilt University and the University of Virginia (UVA). He was also ranked higher than any of his Republican colleagues from Georgia. The study judged effectiveness by looking at a lawmaker's "proven ability to advance a member's agenda items through the legislative process and into law." The scorecard looked at the number of bills a member introduced or sponsored, the bills' significance, and how far each made it in the legislative process.

==== Impeachments ====
Johnson was a member of the United States House Judiciary Task Force on Judicial Impeachment, a task force of the House Judiciary Committee created in 2008. The task force carried out impeachment inquiries into judges Thomas Porteous and Samuel B. Kent. In 2009, Johnson was in the unanimous majority voting to adopt all four articles of impeachment against Kent. All House members participating in the vote voted in favor of each article, with the exception of one member who voted "present" on the fourth article. Johnson was thereafter appointed and served as an impeachment manager (prosecutor) for Kent's impeachment trial. In 2010, he also voted in the unanimous majority that approved all four articles of impeachment against Porteous. He was also appointed and served as an impeachment manager for Porteous's impeachment trial.

On September 24, 2019, Johnson called for the impeachment of President Donald Trump due to the Trump–Ukraine scandal. This was the same day that the related impeachment inquiry was launched. Johnson sat on the House Committee on the Judiciary, which played a significant role in the inquiry. When the committee voted on approving articles of impeachment against Trump to be forwarded to the full House, Johnson voted in favor of approving both articles. In the full House vote on the adoption of the two articles of impeachment against Trump, Johnson voted with the majority to adopt them and thereby approve the first impeachment of Trump. In 2021, he voted for the adoption of sole article of impeachment against Trump in his second impeachment.

==== Washingtonian "Best & Worst" of 2014 ====
On October 5, 2014 The Washingtonian published its 15th biennial "Best & Worst of Congress" list. Johnson was voted "Most Clueless" by congressional staffers.

==== Arbitration ====
Johnson introduced the Forced Arbitration Injustice Repeal Act.

=== Committee assignments ===
For the 119th Congress:

- Committee on the Judiciary
  - Subcommittee on Courts, Intellectual Property, Artificial Intelligence, and the Internet (Ranking Member)
  - Subcommittee on Oversight
  - Subcommittee on the Administrative State, Regulatory Reform, and Antitrust
- Committee on Transportation and Infrastructure
  - Subcommittee on Aviation
  - Subcommittee on Highways and Transit
  - Subcommittee on Railroads, Pipelines, and Hazardous Materials

=== Caucus memberships ===
- Black Maternal Health Caucus
- Congressional Equality Caucus
- Congressional Progressive Caucus
- Congressional Black Caucus
- Congressional Taiwan Caucus
- Congressional Caucus for the Equal Rights Amendment
- Congressional Freethought Caucus
- Congressional Arts Caucus
- U.S.-Japan Caucus
- Medicare for All Caucus
- Tom Lantos Human Rights Commission
- Rare Disease Caucus
- United States–China Working Group
- Congressional Caucus on Turkey and Turkish Americans

== Personal life ==
Johnson is married to attorney and DeKalb County commissioner Mereda Davis Johnson; they have two children.

In December 2009, Johnson revealed that he had been battling Hepatitis C (HCV) for over a decade, which resulted in slow speech and a tendency to regularly get "lost in thought in the middle of a discussion". He said he learned he had the disease in 1998 but did not know how he contracted it. HCV-induced liver dysfunction often leads to hepatic encephalopathy, a cause of confusion. Symptoms are often reversible with treatment. The disease damaged his liver and led to thyroid problems. He was treated with a combination of ribavirin and interferon at Walter Reed Army Medical Center. In February 2010, Johnson successfully completed an experimental treatment for Hepatitis C, which resulted in restored mental acuity, weight gain and increased energy.

Johnson is one of only four Buddhists to have served in the United States Congress. The others are Representative Derek Tran of California, Senator Mazie Hirono and former representative Colleen Hanabusa, both of Hawaii. Johnson is a member of the Nichiren Buddhism-based new religious movement Soka Gakkai International, and has spoken fondly about the group's long-time leader, Daisaku Ikeda, and Soka Gakkai's efforts to abolish nuclear weapons. He spoke at the opening of the SGI-USA's Buddhist Center in Washington, D.C., in 2008, and spoke on the lay practitioner group's podcast in 2020. Johnson's membership in the organization caused controversy when he was first sworn in; the Cult Education Institute's Cult News ran a headline on Johnson's membership and noting the group's perceived reverence for Ikeda and how fringe Soka Gakkai is within Buddhism.

== See also ==
- List of African-American United States representatives
- List of Buddhist members of the United States Congress

U.S. House of Representatives
Preceded by Cynthia McKinney	Member of the U.S. House of Representatives from Georgia's 4th congressional district 2007–present	Incumbent
U.S. order of precedence (ceremonial)
Preceded by Joe Courtney	United States representatives by seniority 59th	Succeeded by Jim Jordan
Preceded by Doris Matsui	Order of precedence of the United States	Succeeded by Joe Courtney
