= Jeff Van Drew =

American politician (born 1953)

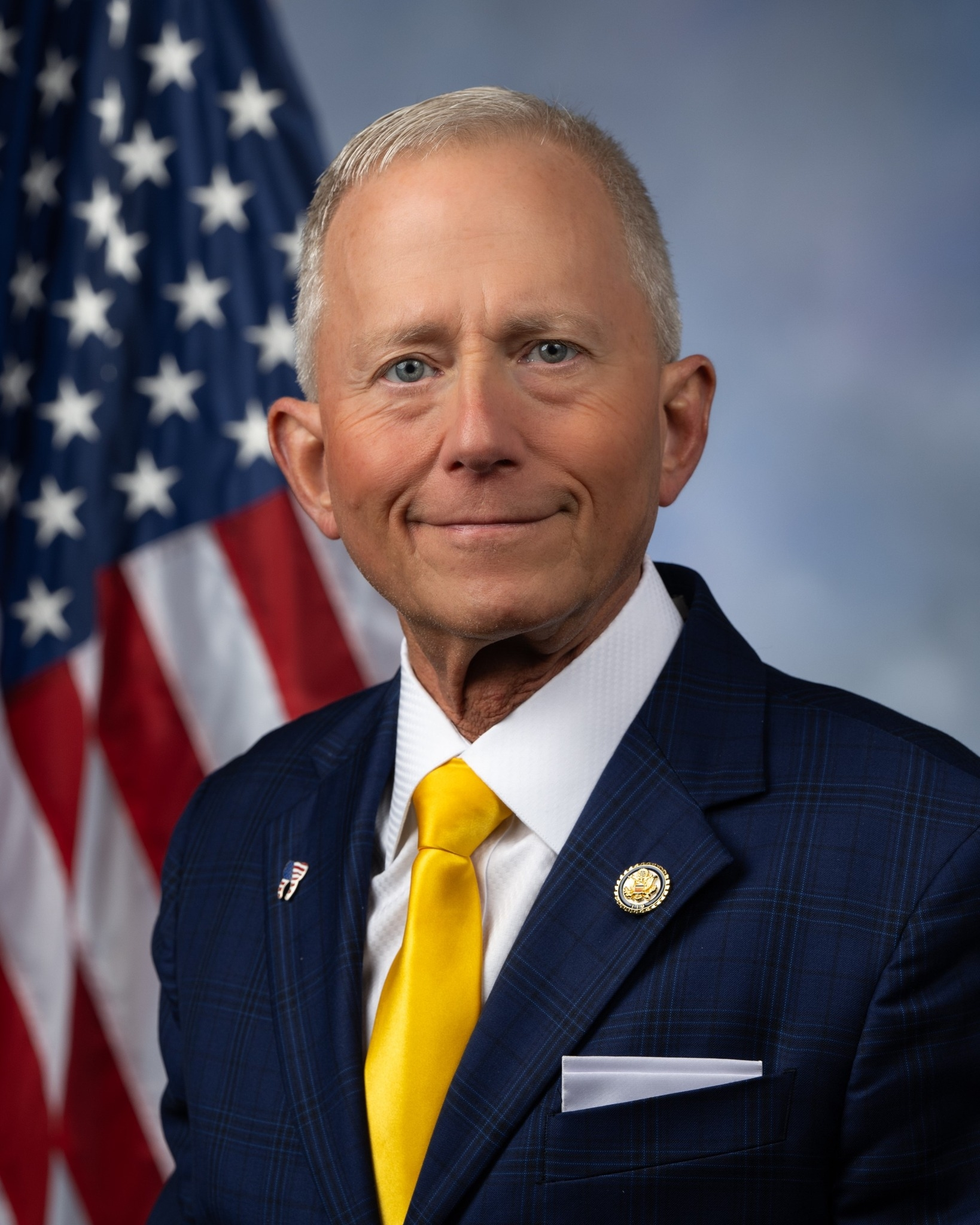
- Official portrait, 2025

Member of the U.S. House of Representatives from New Jersey's 2nd district
- Incumbent
- Assumed office January 3, 2019
- Preceded by: Frank LoBiondo
- Succeeded by: Zack Mullock (elect)

Member of the New Jersey Senate from the 1st district
- In office January 8, 2008 – December 31, 2018
- Preceded by: Nicholas Asselta
- Succeeded by: Bob Andrzejczak

Member of the New Jersey General Assembly from the 1st district
- In office January 8, 2002 – January 8, 2008
- Preceded by: John C. Gibson
- Succeeded by: Matthew W. Milam

Member of the Cape May County Board of Chosen Freeholders
- In office January 1, 2001 – January 8, 2002
- Preceded by: Mark Videtto
- Succeeded by: Leonard Desiderio
- In office January 1, 1995 – January 1, 1998
- Preceded by: Gary Jessel
- Succeeded by: Mark Videtto

Personal details
- Born: Jefferson Van Drew; February 23, 1953 (age 73) New York City, New York, U.S.
- Party: Democratic (before 2020); Republican (2020–present)
- Spouse: Ricarda Van Drew (m. 1974)
- Children: 2
- Education: Rutgers University–New Brunswick (BS); Fairleigh Dickinson University (DMD)
- Website: House website Campaign website

Jefferson H. Van Drew (born February 23, 1953) is an American politician serving as the U.S. representative for New Jersey's 2nd congressional district since 2019. He was first elected as a Democrat and later switched to the Republican Party in 2020.

Before being elected to Congress, Van Drew held several public offices, including fire commissioner, township committee member, Mayor of Dennis Township, New Jersey, and Cape May County Freeholder. He represented New Jersey's 1st legislative district in the New Jersey General Assembly from 2002 to 2008, and represented the same district in the New Jersey Senate from 2008 to 2018.

Van Drew was the Democratic nominee in New Jersey's 2nd congressional district in the 2018 election. He was elected with 52.9% of the vote to Republican Seth Grossman's 45.2%. After opposing the first impeachment of Donald Trump, Van Drew joined the Republican Party shortly afterward. He was reelected in 2020, defeating Democratic challenger Amy Kennedy. Van Drew later supported the unsuccessful attempts to overturn the 2020 United States presidential election. He lost reelection to Democrat Zack Mullock in 2026.

== Early life, education, and career ==
Van Drew was born in New York City. He attended Eastside High School in Paterson, New Jersey, for two years, before transferring to St. Mary’s High School in Perth Amboy, where he graduated in 1971, alongside fellow classmate and future New Jersey Republican congressman Chris Smith.

Van Drew graduated with a B.S. from Rutgers University and received a Doctor of Dental Medicine (D.M.D.) degree from Fairleigh Dickinson University. He operated a dental practice in South Jersey for 30 years before retiring.

== Early political career ==
Van Drew served on the Dennis Township Committee in 1991, and as mayor from 1994 to 1995 and from 1997 to 2003. He served on the Cape May County Board of Chosen Freeholders from 1994 to 1997 and from 2000 to 2002. He was a Dennis Township Fire Commissioner from 1983 to 1986.

In 1994, as a Cape May County Freeholder, Van Drew made support for a local community college a major campaign issue. In 2002, ground was broken on the site of the future Atlantic Cape Community College campus in Cape May County.

Van Drew ran unsuccessfully for State Assembly in 1997, losing to Republican incumbents Nicholas Asselta and John C. Gibson.

Van Drew was a member of the Democratic Party while a local officeholder.

== New Jersey Legislature ==
Van Drew represented the 1st Legislative District in the New Jersey General Assembly from 2002 to 2008. He represented the same district in the New Jersey Senate from 2008 to 2018. He was a Democrat during this period.

On November 6, 2007, Van Drew was elected to the New Jersey Senate, defeating Republican incumbent Nicholas Asselta. In November 2011, Van Drew defeated Republican challenger David S. DeWeese, 24,557 votes to 20,857. He was reelected in 2013, defeating Upper Township Republican businesswoman Susan Adelizzi Schmidt by 20 points.

For the 2018–19 session, Van Drew served in the Senate as Chair of the Community and Urban Affairs Committee, Vice Chair of the Military and Veterans' Affairs, and on the Joint Committee on Housing Affordability and the Intergovernmental Relations Commission. In 2008, he sponsored the Fair Market Drug Pricing Act to establish the New Jersey Rx Card Program to reduce prescription drug prices.

== U.S. House of Representatives ==
=== Elections ===
==== 2018 ====
New Jersey's 2nd congressional district had been represented by Republican Frank LoBiondo since 1995, who served 11 terms before announcing his retirement on November 7, 2017. The district is the southernmost in New Jersey and the state's largest by area, encompassing rural farms from Salem County to the Jersey Shore and Atlantic City. President Barack Obama won the district in 2008 and 2012, and President Donald Trump won in 2016. Upon LoBiondo's retirement announcement, The Cook Political Report changed the district's rating in the 2018 midterms from "Safe Republican" to "Toss-Up".

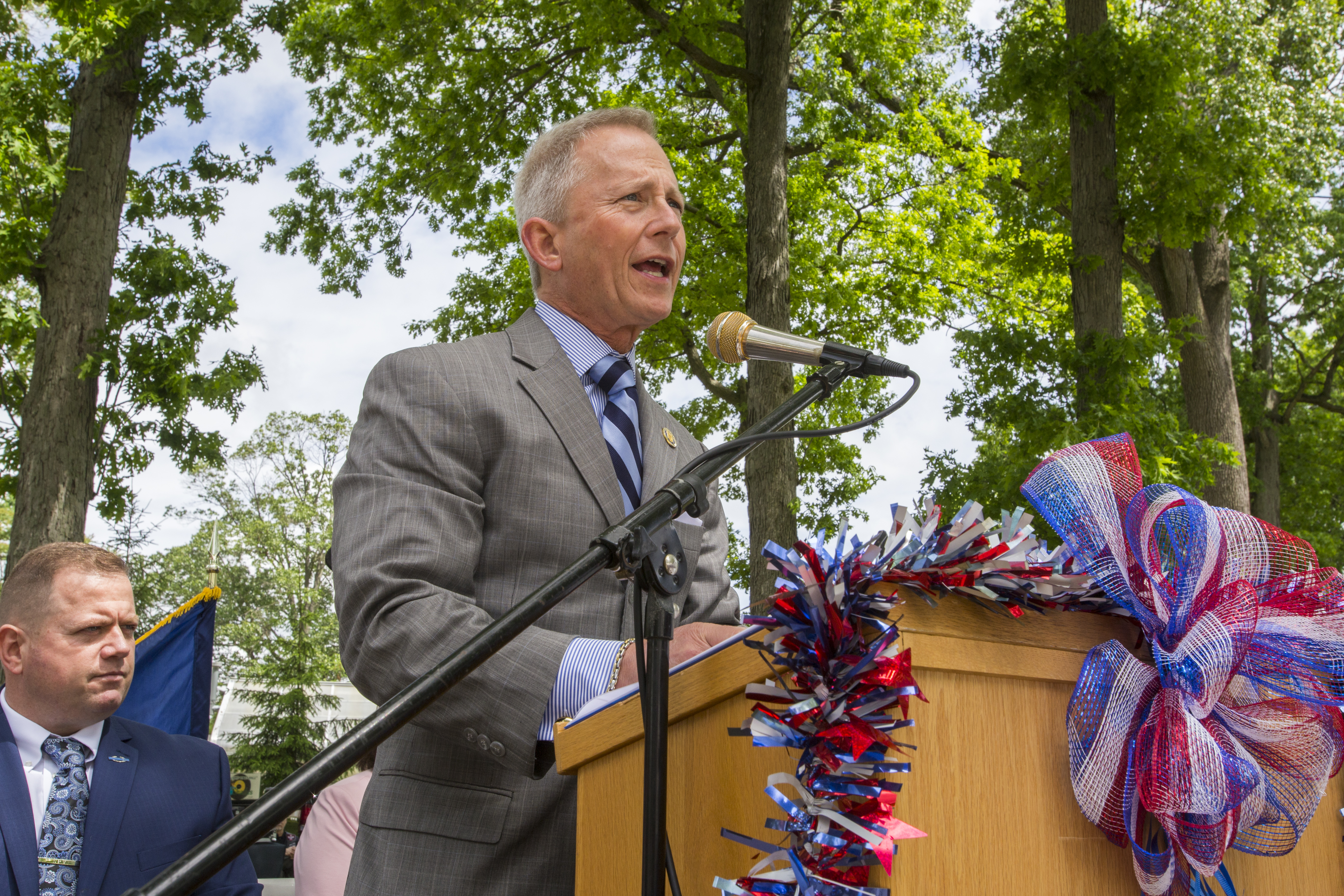
Van Drew speaking at a 2017 Memorial Day event

On November 29, 2017, Van Drew announced he would run for the open seat, aiming "to bring economic opportunity and good jobs to South Jersey." Eight county chairs in the district endorsed him, as did New Jersey Democratic leader George Norcross. In February 2018, the Democratic Congressional Campaign Committee included Van Drew in its Red to Blue program, which provided resources and donors to candidates in districts that were targeted to be flipped from Republican to Democratic. In the June 5 primary, Van Drew faced William Cunningham, Tanzie Youngblood, and Nate Kleinman. Sean Thom dropped out ahead of the primary. As of May 16, Van Drew had raised $412,555 for his campaign. Van Drew won the primary with 55.4% of the vote. The same night, former Atlantic County Freeholder Seth Grossman won the Republican nomination.

After Van Drew's primary win, The Cook Political Report and Sabato's Crystal Ball changed the district's rating to "Likely Democratic". In the November 6 general election, Van Drew defeated Grossman, 52.9%-45.2%. His district was one of four New Jersey congressional districts to flip from Republican to Democratic in 2018.

==== 2020 ====
In late November 2019, Van Drew vowed that he would remain a Democrat even though he opposed Trump's impeachment. In December 2019, it was reported that Van Drew was considering switching to the Republican Party for the 2020 elections, after internal polling showed his stance against Trump's impeachment imperiled him with Democratic voters in his district. After a private meeting between Van Drew and Trump, most of his senior aides resigned in protest. The planned conversion was met with praise and criticism by members of both parties. After reports that he was planning to switch parties, the Blue Dog Coalition, a caucus of fiscally conservative Democrats, dropped him from their ranks. The Cook Political Report changed the rating for the district from "Toss-up" to "Leans Republican" on December 16. On December 19, Van Drew announced that he would join the Republican Party.

Van Drew hired former Trump administration political director Bill Stepien as a campaign adviser. Van Drew officially switched his party affiliation on January 7, 2020. On January 28, Trump held a rally for Van Drew at the Wildwoods Convention Center, joined by Van Drew, State Senators Chris Brown and Mike Testa, and White House counselor Kellyanne Conway.

After the primary, Van Drew became the Republican nominee and faced Democratic nominee Amy Kennedy. In August 2020, the Cook Political Report rated the congressional race a "toss up". On August 27, Van Drew spoke at the 2020 Republican National Convention, discussing his discomfort in his relationship with his former Democratic colleagues in the House and why he supported Trump's reelection. Van Drew defeated Kennedy in the general election, 52% to 46%, or by about 20,000 votes.

==== 2022 ====
Van Drew ran for reelection in the 2022 elections. He won the primary with 82% of the vote, defeating two challengers for the Republican nomination. He won the general election with 59.3% of the vote to Democratic nominee Tim Alexander's 39.6%.

==== 2024 ====
On December 8, 2023, Van Drew announced his intention to run for re-election in the 2024 elections. He was unopposed in the Republican primary and won the general election with 58.1% of the votes.

==== 2026 ====
On November 3, 2026, Van Drew was defeated by Zack Mullock in the 2026 elections.

=== Tenure ===
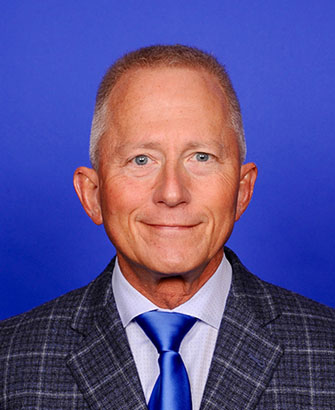
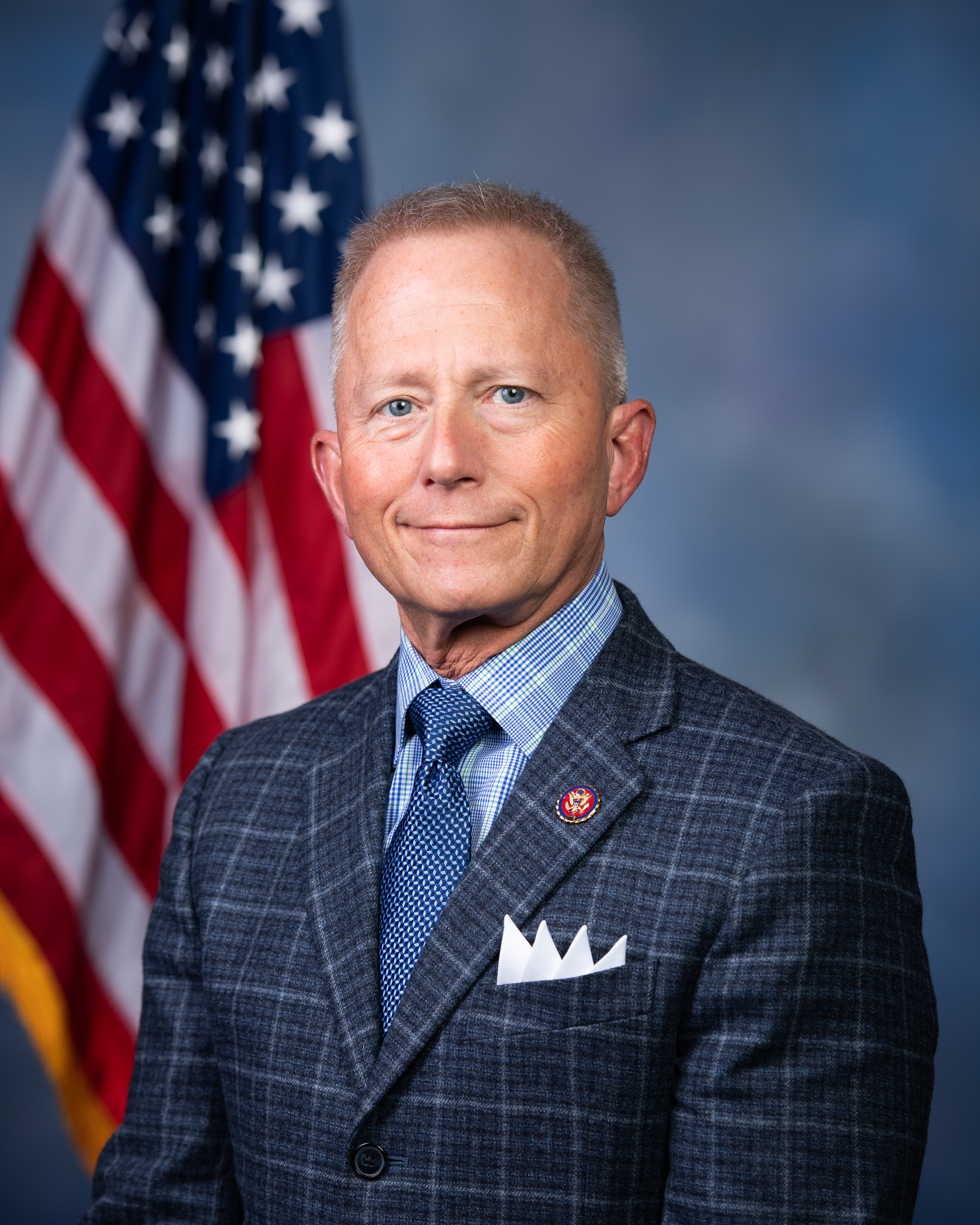
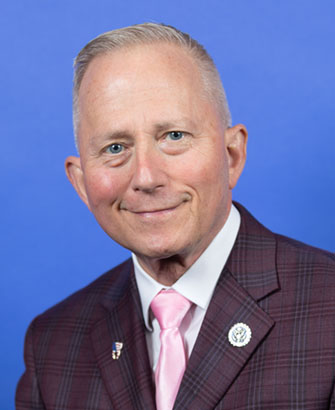
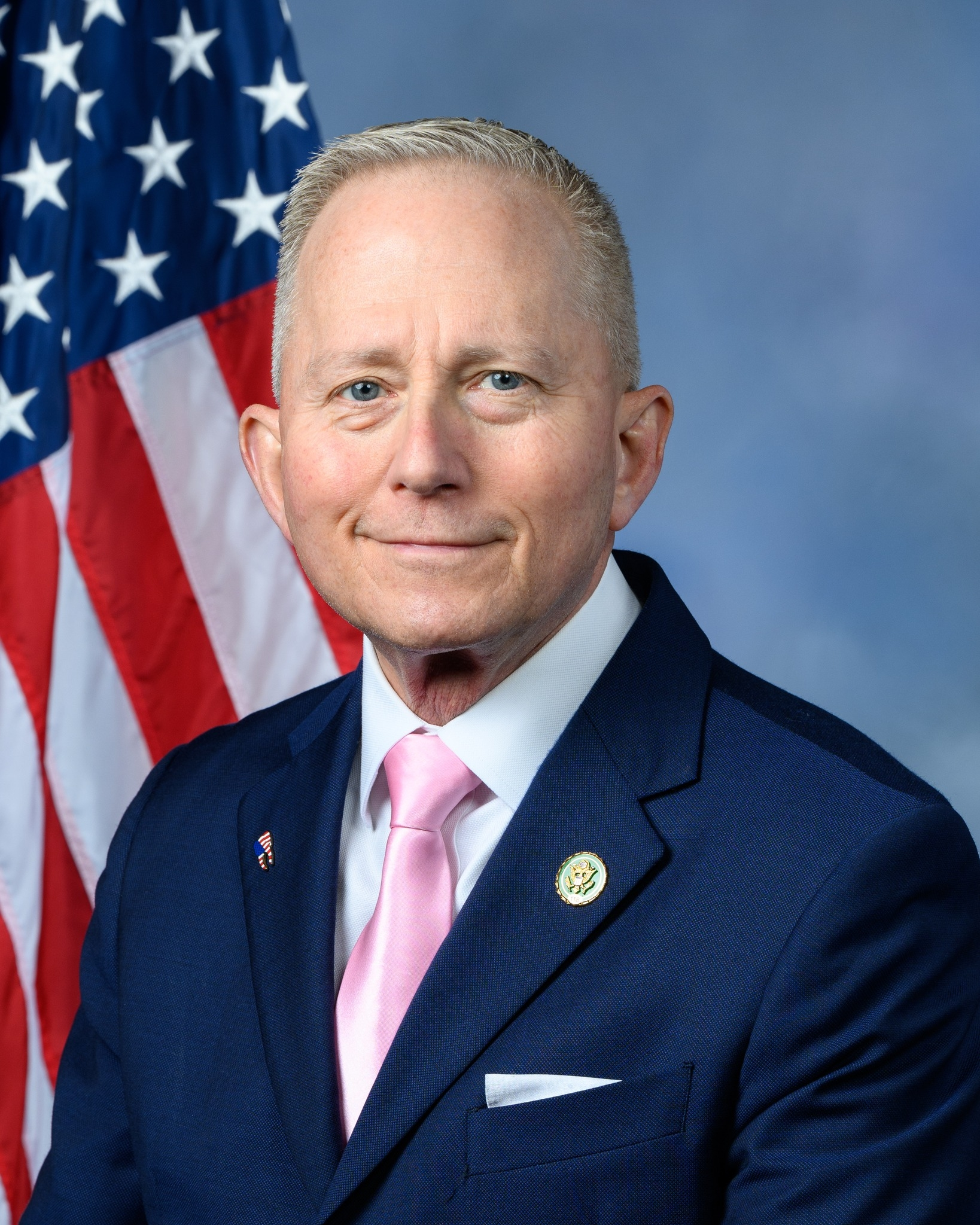
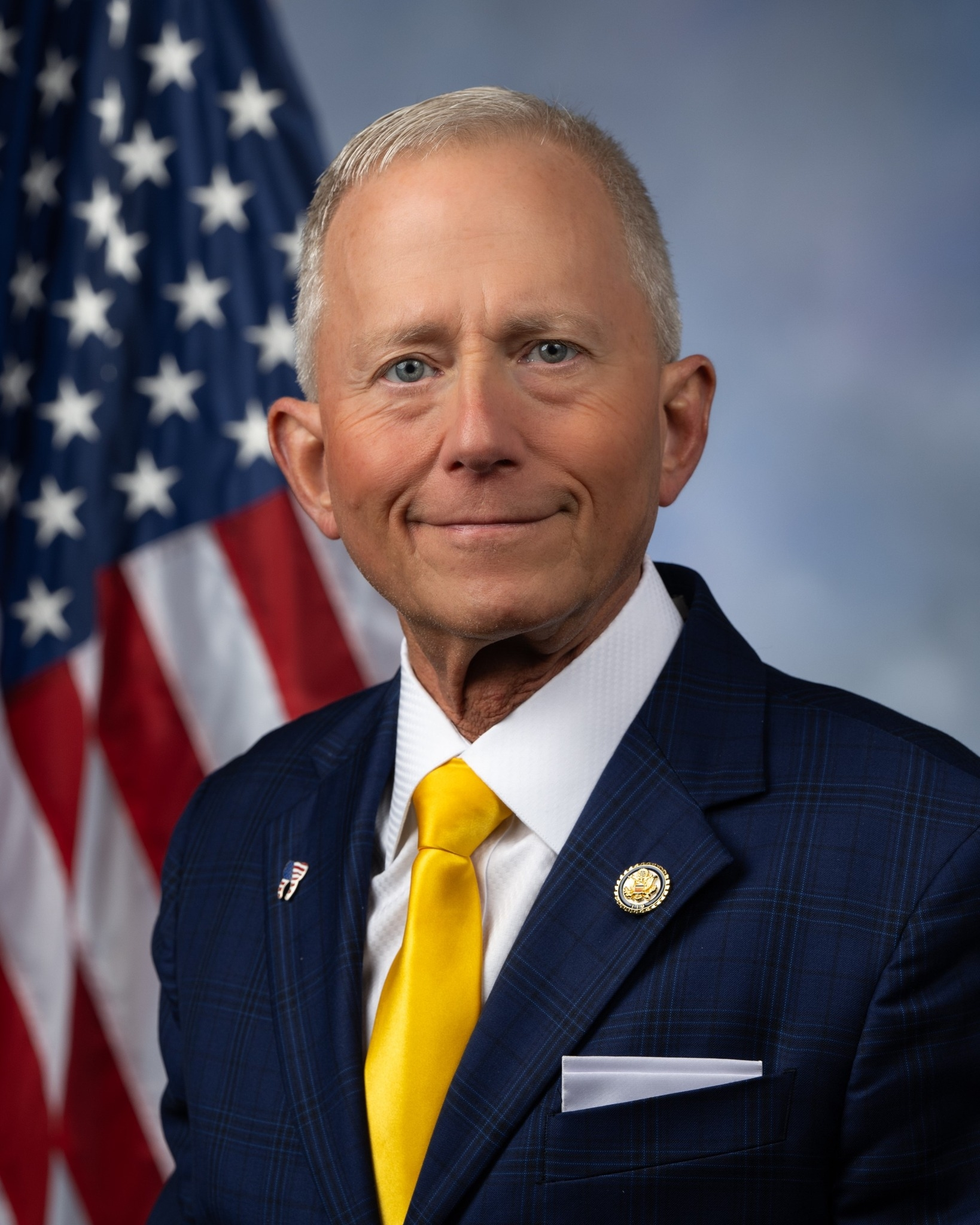
Van Drew's official House portraits over the years.

Van Drew was the first Democrat to represent the district since 1995.

Van Drew said during his campaign that, if elected, he would not support Nancy Pelosi to be the next Speaker of the House. His first vote in Congress was "no" for Speaker which was recorded as "present" under the rules.

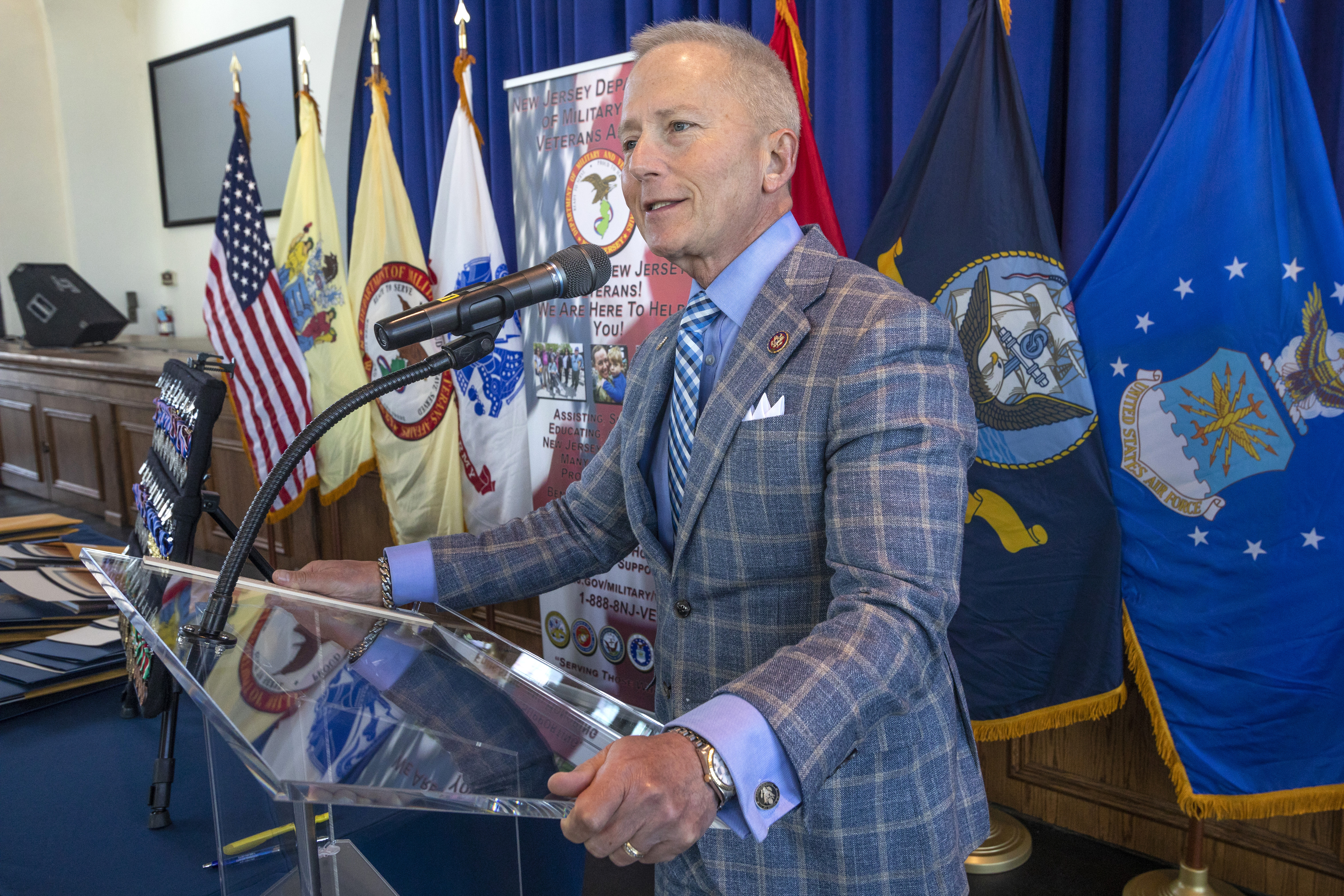
Van Drew in October 2019

In October 2019, he announced that he would oppose the impeachment inquiry against Donald Trump. On October 31, 2019, he and Collin Peterson were the only Democrats to vote against the rules for an impeachment inquiry against Trump. He was also one of two Democrats to vote against both articles of impeachment on December 18, 2019, along with Peterson, although it had already been leaked before the vote that he was planning to switch parties.

Before switching parties, Van Drew voted in line with Democrats 89.7% of the time during his tenure in Congress.

On December 19, 2019, Van Drew publicly announced his decision to join the Republican Party, telling Trump that he had his "undying support." As a result, Trump endorsed him for reelection. Van Drew officially switched his party affiliation on January 7, 2020.

In December 2020, Van Drew was one of 126 Republican members of the House of Representatives to sign an amicus brief in support of Texas v. Pennsylvania, a lawsuit filed at the United States Supreme Court contesting the results of the 2020 presidential election, in which Joe Biden defeated Trump, though the filing erroneously placed Van Drew as representing a district in South Carolina. On January 6, 2021, Van Drew was one of 147 Republican lawmakers who objected to the certification of electoral votes in the 2020 presidential election after Trump supporters stormed the U.S. Capitol and forced an emergency recess of Congress. Van Drew says he received a death threat from a journalist because of the objection.

On February 4, 2021, Van Drew voted against removing Marjorie Taylor Greene from her positions on the House Budget and the Education and Labor committees over comments she had made and conspiracy theories she had espoused.

In May 2021, Van Drew joined a majority of Republicans who voted to oust Liz Cheney from House Republican leadership, saying, "she is not providing the leadership that would create unity within our caucus and it's very important as we go into the next election, it's very important as we deal with policy issues, that we are unified and we are strong, and I don't think that brand and style of leadership that she used was creating that but rather was splitting people apart."

On November 5, 2021, Van Drew and 12 other House Republicans broke with their party to vote with a majority of Democrats for the Infrastructure Investment and Jobs Act.

On May 22, 2025, Van Drew voted for the Republican One Big Beautiful Bill Act that significantly cut Medicaid, despite previously signing a letter opposing such reductions. The legislation included an expansion of Section 199A, a tax provision set to expire at the end of the year, which could personally benefit Van Drew, who reported over $5,000 in pass-through rental income. The deduction is estimated to cost $730 billion over the next decade, with proposed changes adding an additional $50 billion.

=== Political positions ===
==== Agriculture ====
Van Drew opposes federal preemption of state and local agricultural laws, including laws related to farm animal welfare. In October 2023, Van Drew was one of 16 House Republicans to sign a letter to the House Agriculture Committee opposing the inclusion of the Ending Agricultural Trade Suppression (EATS) Act in the 2023 farm bill, which would have invalidated California's Proposition 12 and other state laws prohibiting the sale of animal products raised in battery cages, gestation crates, and veal crates. In March 2024, Van Drew signed another House Republican letter opposing the EATS Act, claiming that it would result in foreign-owned agribusiness companies such as the Chinese-owned WH Group gaining influence over the U.S. agricultural sector.

==== Energy ====
Van Drew helped found and co-chaired the Offshore Wind Caucus in Congress. However, in 2024, Van Drew left the caucus. Over the years, he had become a vocal critic of offshore wind. Van Drew argued that offshore wind kills whales. In 2025, Van Drew collaborated with President Donald Trump to freeze offshore wind energy projects in the United States.

==== Foreign and defense policy ====
In September 2021, Van Drew was among 135 House Republicans to vote for the National Defense Authorization Act of 2022, which contains a provision that would require women to register for the draft.

In July 2021, Van Drew voted for the bipartisan ALLIES Act, which would increase by 8,000 the number of special immigrant visas for Afghan allies of the U.S. military during its invasion of Afghanistan, while also reducing some application requirements that caused long application backlogs; the bill passed the House, 407–16.

Van Drew voted against H.R. 7691, the Additional Ukraine Supplemental Appropriations Act, 2022, which would provide $40 billion in emergency aid to the Ukrainian government.

Van Drew was one of 18 Republicans to vote against Sweden and Finland joining NATO.

==== LGBTQIA+ rights ====
In 2021, Van Drew co-sponsored the Fairness for All Act, the Republican alternative to the Equality Act. The bill would prohibit discrimination on the basis of sex, sexual orientation, and gender identity, and protect the free exercise of religion.

In 2021, Van Drew was one of 29 Republicans to vote to reauthorize the Violence Against Women Act. The bill expanded legal protections for transgender people, and contained provisions allowing transgender women to use women's shelters and serve time in prisons matching their gender identity.

Van Drew was one of 31 Republicans to vote for the LGBTQ Business Equal Credit Enforcement and Investment Act.

On July 19, 2022, Van Drew and 46 other Republican representatives voted for the Respect for Marriage Act, which would codify the right to same-sex marriage in federal law. On December 8, 2022, he voted against the final passage of the Respect for Marriage Act as amended by the US Senate.

In 2023, Van Drew sponsored H.R.216, the My Child, My Choice Act, which would revoke federal education funding for schools that do not require teachers to obtain written parental consent before teaching lessons specifically related to gender identity, sexual orientation, or transgender studies, and for other purposes.

==== Fiscal Responsibility Act of 2023 ====
Van Drew was among the 71 Republicans who voted against final passage of the Fiscal Responsibility Act of 2023 in the House.

==== Second Amendment Rights ====
In response to the Killing of Alex Pretti, Van Drew stated that Pretti could not be a peaceful protestor since he was armed: “Peaceful protesters don’t have 9mm weapons with two extra magazines."

==== Support for expunging Trump's impeachments ====
In the 118th Congress he co-sponsored a pair of resolutions meant to expunge the impeachments of Donald Trump. In the 119th United States Congress, he again co-sponsored resolutions to expunge Trump's impeachments.

=== Committee assignments ===
For the 119th Congress:

- Committee on the Judiciary
  - Subcommittee on Immigration Integrity, Security, and Enforcement
  - Subcommittee on Oversight (Chair)
- Committee on Transportation and Infrastructure
  - Subcommittee on Aviation
  - Subcommittee on Coast Guard and Maritime Transportation
  - Subcommittee on Highways and Transit

=== Caucus memberships ===
- Republican Governance Group
- Congressional LGBTQ+ Equality Caucus (2019 until 2020, rejoined 2021, left 2022)
- Congressional Motorcycle Caucus
- Rare Disease Caucus

== Political positions ==
In his run for State Senate in 2007, Van Drew remarked, "I'm proud to be a Democrat because to me it always represented working people, middle-class people and issues of compassion." He represented Republican-leaning Cape May County in the assembly, and accordingly took politically moderate positions. He was one of the most conservative Democrats in the state senate. As of January 2021, FiveThirtyEight, which tracks congressional votes, reports that Van Drew voted with Trump 27.5% of the time. During the 116th Congress he voted with Trump's position 25% of the time and in the 117th Congress, he voted with Trump's position 100% of the time. As of November 2022, he had voted with Biden's position in Congress 24% of the time.

During his congressional primary campaign, Van Drew had a 100% rating from the National Rifle Association of America (NRA). In 2007 and 2008, he received $2,700 from the National Shooting Sports Foundation, and in 2008, he received $1,000 from the NRA. In 2010, Van Drew sponsored legislation that would allow residents to carry a handgun after going through a background check, taking a firearms training course, passing a test, and paying a $500 fee. In 2013, he was the only Democrat to vote against a series of ten gun control bills after the Sandy Hook Elementary School shooting. Van Drew also voiced support for expanded background checks and the regulation for silencers. Despite his pro-gun stance, the gun-control group Moms Demand Action designated Van Drew a "Gun Sense Candidate".

In 2012, while serving in the State Senate, Van Drew was one of two Democrats to vote against a bill to legalize same-sex marriage in New Jersey. During his 2013 reelection campaign, the socially conservative nonprofit group New Jersey Family First sent out flyers stating that Van Drew "supports traditional marriage and letting the people vote on the definition of marriage", while his Republican opponent Susan Adelizzi Schmidt was supportive of same-sex marriage. In 2022, Van Drew initially voted for the passage of the Respect for Marriage Act; however, he later reversed that position and voted against the final passage of the Respect for Marriage Act as amended by the US Senate.

Also in 2012, Van Drew was the only Democrat to vote against raising the state minimum wage above the federal minimum wage of $7.25. On his campaign website, he highlighted his support for fully funding the Children's Health Insurance Program and protecting net neutrality. Van Drew also supported a state constitutional amendment requiring parental approval for abortions, which he later withdrew. As state senator, he also withdrew sponsorship of a bill to reinstate the death penalty in the state, which he had favored while serving as a state assemblyman.

Van Drew opposes offshore drilling on the Atlantic coast. In 2019, he joined Republican John Rutherford to introduce the Atlantic Coastal Economies Protection Act, which would prohibit seismic air gun testing in the Atlantic Ocean. Van Drew previously voted to withdraw from Regional Greenhouse Gas Initiative and supported the construction of a pipeline through the Pinelands.

In 2020, Van Drew said that he was pro-choice but opposed late-term abortions, and in 2018, he expressed his support for Roe v. Wade (the landmark decision that legalized abortion nationwide), saying, "any efforts to weaken or undermine [abortion rights] will face my fierce opposition." In 2022, Van Drew criticized those responsible for leaking Justice Samuel Alito's Dobbs v. Jackson Women's Health Organization draft opinion, saying, "This is a clear effort to inflict public backlash of a Supreme Court decision to intimidate the justices to reverse their position". After the Supreme Court overturned Roe, his office issued a press release saying that Van Drew supports the overturning of Roe and letting the states set abortion law. In a 2022 debate, he said, "Personally I am pro-life."

In 2024, amidst the 2024 New Jersey drone sightings, Van Drew claimed that Iran had launched a drone mothership that was off the coast of New Jersey.

== Electoral history ==
United States House of Representatives elections, 2024
Party	Candidate	Votes	%
Republican	Jeff Van Drew (incumbent)	215,946	58.1
Democratic	Joe Salerno	153,117	41.2
Green	Thomas Cannavo	2,557	0.7
Total votes		371,620	100.0
Republican hold			

United States House of Representatives elections, 2022
Party	Candidate	Votes	%
Republican	Jeff Van Drew (incumbent)	139,217	58.9
Democratic	Tim Alexander	94,522	40.0
Total votes		236,484	100.0
Republican hold			

United States House of Representatives elections, 2020
Party	Candidate	Votes	%
Republican	Jeff Van Drew (incumbent)	195,526	51.9
Democratic	Amy Kennedy	173,849	46.2
Total votes		376,547	100.0
Republican hold			

August 9, 2020 Republican primary results
Party	Candidate	Votes	%
Republican	Jeff Van Drew (incumbent)	45,226	82.4
Republican	Bob Patterson	9,691	17.6

United States House of Representatives elections, 2018
Party	Candidate	Votes	%
Democratic	Jeff Van Drew	125,755	52.9%
Republican	Seth Grossman	110,491	45.2%
Libertarian	John Ordille	1,631	0.6%
Independent	Steven Fencihel	1,046	0.4%
Independent	Anthony Parisi Sanchez	964	0.4%
Independent	William R. Benfer	816	0.4%
Total votes		240,703	100.00
Democratic gain from Republican			

June 5, 2018 Democratic primary results
Party	Candidate	Votes	%
Democratic	Jeff Van Drew	15,654	55.4
Democratic	Tanzira "Tanzie" Youngblood	5,417	19.2
Democratic	William Cunningham	4,739	16.8
Democratic	Nate Kleinman	2,443	8.6
Total votes		28,253	100

2017 New Jersey State Senate District 1 Election
Party	Candidate	Votes	%
Democratic	Jeff Van Drew (incumbent)	35,464	64.8%
Republican	Mary Gruccio	18,589	34.0%
Independent	Anthony Parisi Sanchez	652	1.2%
Democratic hold			

2013 New Jersey State Senate District 1 Election
Party	Candidate	Votes	%
Democratic	Jeff Van Drew (incumbent)	34,624	59.4%
Republican	Susan Adelizzi Schmidt	22,835	39.2%
Independent	Tom Greto	825	1.4%
Democratic hold			

2011 New Jersey State Senate District 1 Election
Party	Candidate	Votes	%
Democratic	Jeff Van Drew (incumbent)	24,557	54.0
Republican	David S. DeWeese	20,857	45.9
Democratic hold			

2007 New Jersey State Senate District 1 Election
Party	Candidate	Votes	%
Democratic	Jeff Van Drew	28,240	55.7
Republican	Nicholas Asselta (incumbent)	22,469	44.3
Democratic gain from Republican			

== Personal life ==
Van Drew and his wife, Ricarda, have two children. He is a resident of Dennis Township. Van Drew has served as president of the New Jersey Dental Society and a board expert of the New Jersey Board of Dentistry.

Van Drew is a Freemason at Cannon Lodge No. 104 in South Seaville, New Jersey. Van Drew identifies his religion as being a Roman Catholic.

U.S. House of Representatives
Preceded by Frank LoBiondo	Member of the U.S. House of Representatives from New Jersey's 2nd congressional district 2019–present	Incumbent
U.S. order of precedence (ceremonial)
Preceded by Lauren Underwood	United States representatives by seniority 234th	Succeeded by Greg Murphy
