= Otto Beatty Jr. =

American politician (1940–2021)

Member of the Ohio House of Representatives
- In office April 22, 1980 – May 30, 1999
- Preceded by: Phale Hale
- Succeeded by: Joyce Beatty
- Constituency: 31st district (1980‍–‍1993); 21st district (1993‍–‍1999)

Personal details
- Born: January 26, 1940 Columbus, Ohio, U.S.
- Died: May 14, 2021 (aged 81) Columbus, Ohio, U.S.
- Resting place: Green Lawn Cemetery
- Party: Democratic
- Spouse: Joyce Birdsong (m. 1992)
- Education: Howard University (BA, MABA); Ohio State University (JD)
- Occupation: Lawyer; real estate investor; politician

Otto Beatty Jr. (January 26, 1940 – May 14, 2021) was a member of the Ohio House of Representatives and a Democrat. Beatty was an African-American. He was first elected in 1979, and was subsequently elected until 1999, when he resigned and was succeeded by his wife, Joyce Beatty.

== Personal life ==
Beatty was born in Columbus, Ohio, and graduated from the University High School. He received his bachelor and masters degrees in business administration from Howard University and his law degree from Ohio State University Moritz College of Law. Beatty was admitted to the Ohio bar and practiced law in Columbus, Ohio. Beatty died on May 14, 2021.
