= Cultural Arts Center =

Cultural center in Columbus, Ohio

Priscilla R. Tyson Cultural Arts Center

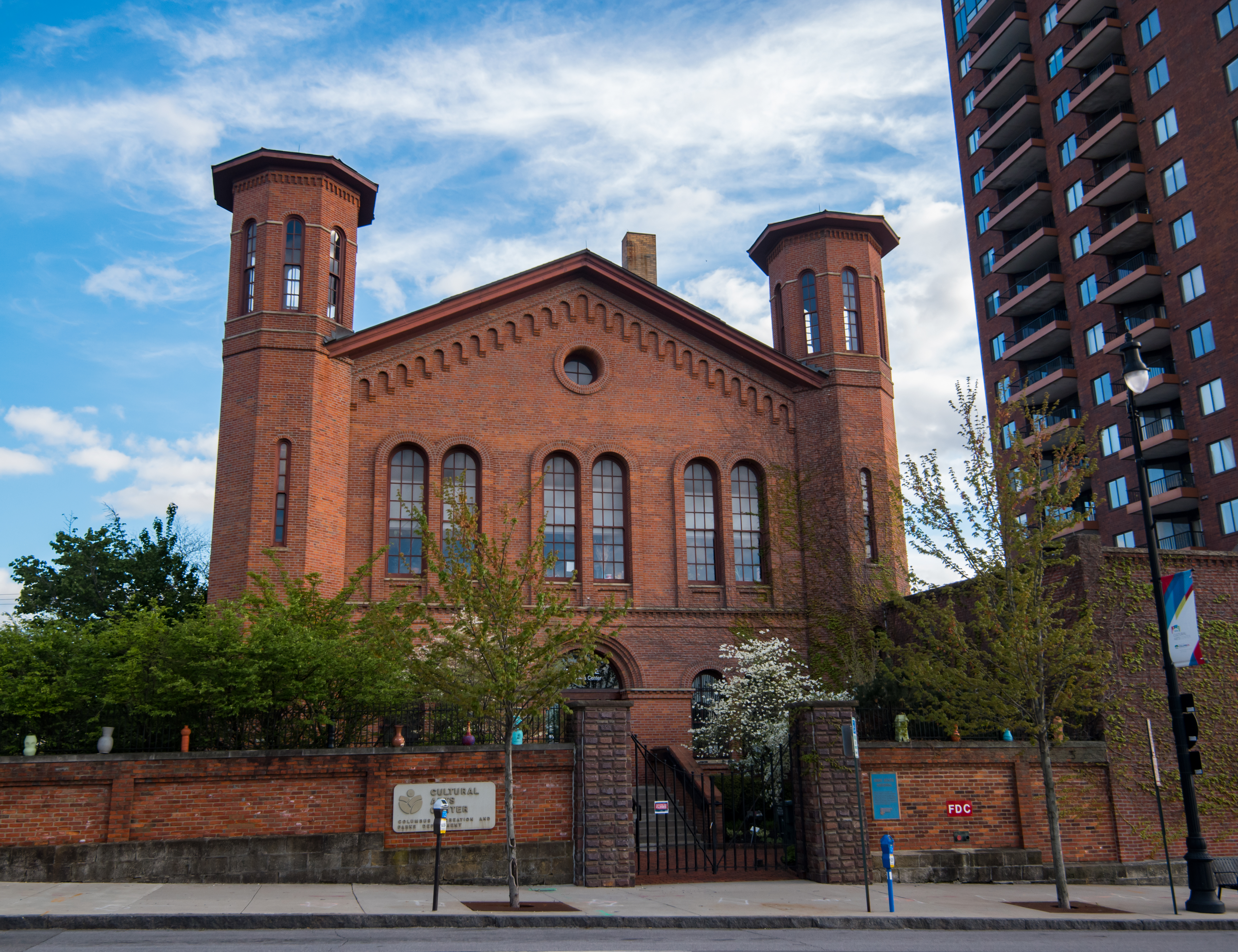
- Former name: Ohio State Arsenal
- Established: 1976
- Location: 139 West Main Street; Columbus, Ohio 43215; USA
- Type: Cultural center
- Public transit access: 3, 6, 9 CoGo
- Website: Official website
- Ohio State Arsenal
- U.S. National Register of Historic Places
- Columbus Register of Historic Properties
- The art center among Scioto Mile parks
- Coordinates: 39°57′19″N 83°00′12″W
- Architectural style: Italianate
- NRHP reference No.: 74001495
- CRHP No.: CR-2

Significant dates
- Added to NRHP: July 18, 1974
- Designated CRHP: February 8, 1982

The Priscilla R. Tyson Cultural Arts Center is a combination art gallery and teaching space, primarily for visual artists and crafters, in downtown Columbus, Ohio. It is a 38,500 square-foot space at 139 West Main Street, and is part of the city's Scioto Mile tourist district. Features of the space include a ceramics lab in the basement, with painting and weaving labs on upper floors. It offers community oriented arts classes at a variety of levels, and is also utilized as an events space.

== History ==
The site of the center was originally a state penitentiary, in 1814. It was demolished and rebuilt in 1861 as it exists today by prisoner labor as the Ohio State Arsenal. This brick Italianate arsenal building housed weapons and horses during the American Civil War. Historical artifacts on site include an eagle-and-shield from the battleship USS Ohio and a bell from the missile cruiser the USS Columbus. A proposed flag of Ohio briefly flew over the arsenal. The arsenal building was added to the National Register of Historic Places on July 18, 1974. The Cultural Arts Center is also featured on many of Columbus's historical tours.

Access to the building was acquired by the city from the state through a 99-year lease at a cost of $1/year. It was transformed into an arts center starting in 1976, with the help of a $1.4 million grant from the US Department of Commerce, with the official opening on June 11, 1978. The arts center was formerly housed in the old Engine House No. 12, from 1952 to 1978.

The building was named for Priscilla Tyson, the longest-serving female councilmember on the Columbus City Council, in 2023.
