= First impeachment of Donald Trump =

2019 US presidential impeachment

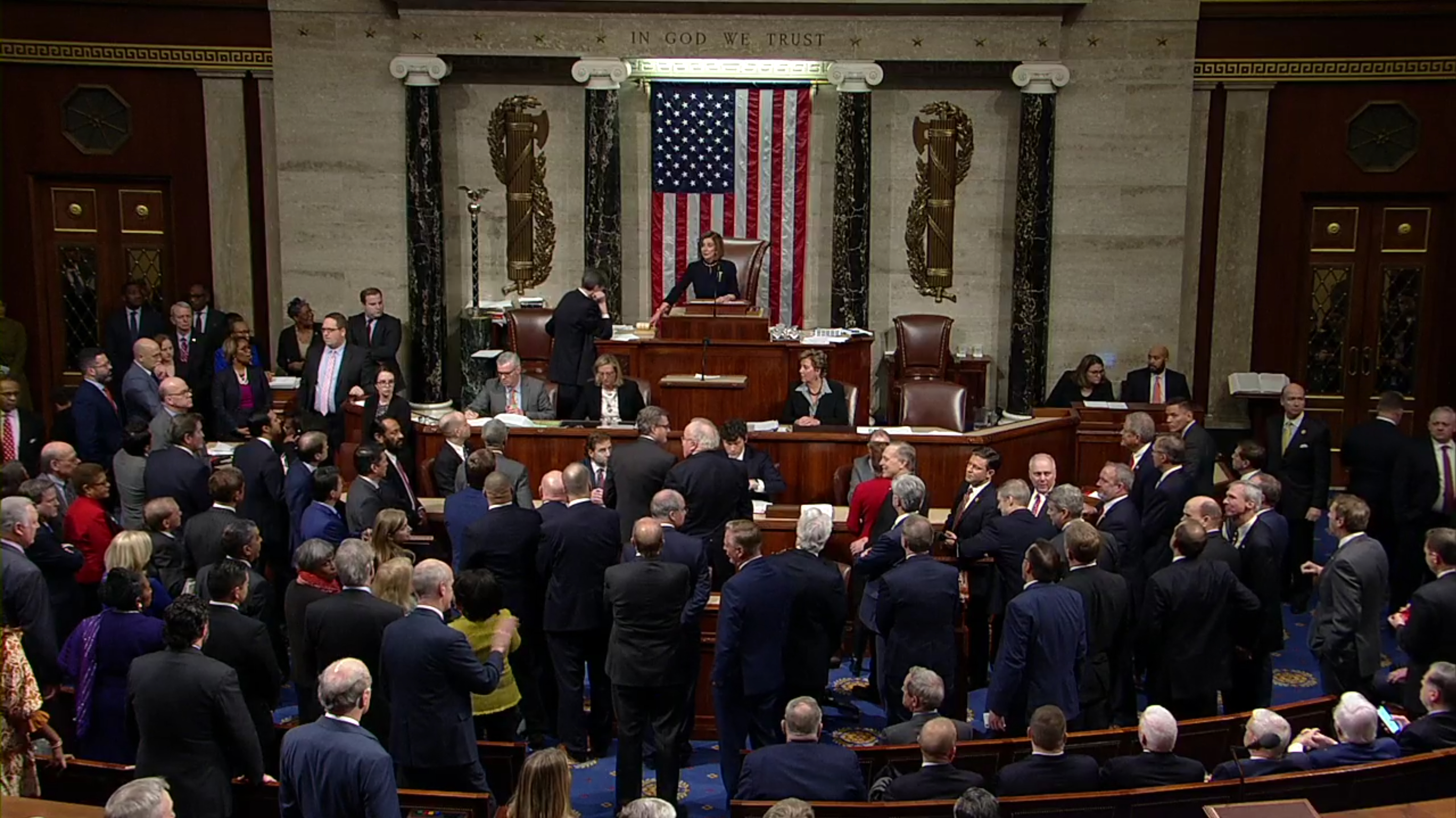
- Members of the House of Representatives vote on two articles of impeachment.
- Accused: Donald Trump, 45th President of the United States
- Proponents: Nancy Pelosi (Speaker of the House of Representatives); Adam Schiff (Chair of the House Intelligence Committee); Jerry Nadler (Chair of the House Judiciary Committee)
- Date: December 18, 2019 – February 5, 2020 (1 month, 2 weeks and 4 days)
- Outcome: Acquitted by the U.S. Senate, remained in the office of President of the United States
- Charges: Abuse of power, obstruction of Congress
- Cause: Allegations that Trump unlawfully solicited Ukrainian authorities to influence the 2020 U.S. presidential election

Congressional votes

Voting in the U.S. House of Representatives
- Accusation: Abuse of power
- Votes in favor: 230
- Votes against: 197
- Present: 1
- Not voting: 3
- Result: Approved
- Accusation: Obstruction of Congress
- Votes in favor: 229
- Votes against: 198
- Present: 1
- Not voting: 3
- Result: Approved

Voting in the U.S. Senate
- Accusation: Article I – Abuse of power
- Votes in favor: 48 "guilty"
- Votes against: 52 "not guilty"
- Result: Acquitted (2/3 "guilty" votes necessary for a conviction)
- Accusation: Article II – Obstruction of Congress
- Votes in favor: 47 "guilty"
- Votes against: 53 "not guilty"
- Result: Acquitted (67 "guilty" votes necessary for a conviction)

Donald Trump, serving as the 45th president of the United States, was impeached for the first time on December 18, 2019; however, he was not removed from office. On that date, the House of Representatives adopted two articles of impeachment against Trump: abuse of power and obstruction of Congress. On February 5, 2020, the Senate voted to acquit Trump on both articles of impeachment.

Trump's first impeachment took place after a formal House inquiry found that he had solicited foreign interference in the 2020 U.S. presidential election from Ukraine to help his re-election bid, and had then obstructed the inquiry itself by telling his administration officials to ignore subpoenas for documents and testimony. The inquiry reported that Trump withheld military aid (Note: The aid was intended to help Ukraine in its war against Russian-backed separatist forces in Donbas.) and an invitation to the White House from Ukrainian president Volodymyr Zelenskyy in order to influence Ukraine to announce an investigation into Trump's political opponent Joe Biden, and to promote a discredited conspiracy theory that Ukraine – not Russia – was behind interference in the 2016 presidential election. The inquiry stage of Trump's impeachment lasted from September to November 2019 in the wake of an August whistleblower complaint alleging Trump's abuse of power. A set of impeachment hearings before the House Judiciary Committee began on December 4, 2019; on December 13, the committee voted 23–17 (along party lines) to recommend articles of impeachment for abuse of power and obstruction of Congress. Two days later, the full House approved both articles in a mostly party-line vote. Trump is the third U.S. president in history to be impeached and the first to be impeached without support for the impeachment from his own party.

The articles of impeachment were submitted to the Senate on January 16–31, 2020, initiating an impeachment trial. The trial saw no witnesses or documents being subpoenaed, as Republican senators rejected attempts to introduce subpoenas. On February 5, Trump was acquitted on both counts by the Senate, as neither count received 2/3 votes to convict.

Trump remained in office for the remainder of his first term. However, he was impeached for a second time in 2021 following the January 6 United States Capitol attack, making him the first U.S. president in history to be impeached twice. Trump was again acquitted by the Senate in February 2021 after he had left office.

== Background ==
Donald Trump is the third U.S. president to be impeached by the House of Representatives, after Andrew Johnson in 1868 and Bill Clinton in 1998. Before Trump, Johnson was the only president to be impeached in his first term. (Note: Johnson sought election to a full term, but failed to gain the nomination of his (Democratic) party, and the election was won by (Republican candidate) Ulysses S. Grant.) The House Judiciary Committee also voted to adopt three articles of impeachment against Richard Nixon, but he resigned prior to the full House vote. (Note: Nixon was pardoned for his crimes by his successor, Gerald Ford.) The Senate voted to acquit both Johnson and Clinton in their trials. (Note: Clinton was found to be guilty of civil contempt of court stemming from the Jones v. Clinton case over his testimony. Clinton ended up agreeing to a five-year suspension from practicing law in Arkansas. The Supreme Court suspended Clinton from the Supreme Court bar for his Arkansas suspension. Clinton would resign from the bar during the appeal process of disbarment from the court.)

"Impeaching Donald John Trump, President of the United States, for high crimes and misdemeanors" by Congressman Brad Sherman

Congress's first efforts to impeach Trump were initiated by Democratic representatives Al Green and Brad Sherman in 2017. In December 2017, an impeachment resolution failed in the House with a 58–364 vote margin. Following the 2018 elections, the Democrats gained a majority in the House and launched multiple investigations into Trump's actions and finances. Speaker of the House Nancy Pelosi initially resisted calls for impeachment. In May 2019, however, she indicated that Trump's continued actions, which she characterized as obstruction of justice and refusal to honor congressional subpoenas, might make an impeachment inquiry necessary.

Investigations into various scandals in the Trump administration, which could lead to articles of impeachment, were initiated by various House congressional committees led by Pelosi in February 2019. A formal impeachment investigation began in July 2019, and several subpoenas were issued; while most were honored, several were not. The Trump administration asserted executive privilege, which led to several lawsuits, including In re: Don McGahn.

=== Trump–Ukraine scandal ===
Whistleblower complaint dated August 12, 2019, regarding a July 25 phone conversation between Trump and Zelenskyy

Memorandum of the phone call between Trump and Zelenskyy released by the White House on September 25, 2019

Volodymyr Zelenskyy with Donald Trump in New York City on September 25, 2019

The Trump–Ukraine scandal revolved around efforts by U.S. president Donald Trump to coerce Ukraine and other foreign countries into providing damaging narratives about 2020 Democratic Party presidential primary candidate Joe Biden, as well as information relating to the origins of previous political attacks against him, such as the claims investigated by Robert Mueller. Trump enlisted surrogates within and outside his official administration, including his lawyer Rudy Giuliani and Attorney General William Barr, to pressure Ukraine and other foreign governments to cooperate in investigating conspiracy theories concerning American politics. Trump blocked but later released payment of a congressionally mandated $400 million military aid package to allegedly obtain quid pro quo cooperation from Volodymyr Zelenskyy, the president of Ukraine. A number of contacts were established between the White House and the government of Ukraine, culminating in a phone call between Trump and Zelenskyy on July 25, 2019. Less than two hours later, on behalf of the president, senior executive budget official Michael Duffey discreetly instructed the Pentagon to continue withholding military aid to Ukraine. (Note: This remained classified until December 2019.)

The scandal reached public attention in mid-September 2019 after a whistleblower complaint made in August 2019. The complaint raised concerns about Trump using presidential powers to solicit foreign electoral intervention in the 2020 U.S. presidential election. The Trump White House has corroborated several allegations raised by the whistleblower. A non-verbatim transcript of the Trump–Zelenskyy phone call confirmed that Trump requested investigations into Joe Biden and his son Hunter, as well as a discredited conspiracy theory involving a Democratic National Committee server, while repeatedly urging Zelenskyy to work with Giuliani and Barr on these matters. The White House also confirmed that the record of the call had been transferred to a highly classified system. White House acting chief of staff Mick Mulvaney said one reason why Trump withheld military aid to Ukraine was Ukrainian "corruption related to the DNC server", referring to a debunked theory that Ukrainians framed Russia for hacking into the DNC computer system. After the impeachment inquiry began, Trump publicly urged Ukraine and China to investigate the Bidens. Bill Taylor, the Trump administration's top diplomat to Ukraine, testified that he was told that U.S. military aid to Ukraine and a Trump–Zelenskyy White House meeting were conditioned on Zelenskyy publicly announcing investigations into the Bidens and alleged Ukrainian interference in the 2016 U.S. elections. United States ambassador to the European Union Gordon Sondland testified that he worked with Giuliani at Trump's "express direction" to arrange a quid pro quo with the Ukraine government.

=== Inquiry ===
On the evening of September 24, 2019, Pelosi announced that six committees of the House of Representatives would begin a formal impeachment inquiry into President Trump. Pelosi accused the President of betraying his oath of office, national security, and the integrity of the country's elections. The six committees charged with the task were those on Financial Services, the Judiciary, Intelligence, Foreign Affairs, Oversight and Reform, and Ways and Means.

In October 2019, three congressional committees (Intelligence, Oversight, and Foreign Affairs) deposed witnesses, including Ambassador Taylor, Laura Cooper (the deputy assistant secretary of defense for Russian, Ukrainian, and Eurasian affairs), and former White House official Fiona Hill. Witnesses testified that they believed that President Trump wanted Zelenskyy to publicly announce investigations into the Bidens and Burisma (a Ukrainian natural gas company on whose board Hunter Biden had served) and 2016 election interference. On October 8, in a letter from White House counsel Pat Cipollone to House speaker Pelosi, the White House officially responded that it would not cooperate with the investigation due to concerns including that there had not yet been a vote of the full House and that interviews of witnesses were being conducted behind closed doors. On October 17, Mulvaney said in response to a reporter's allegation of quid pro quo, "We do that all the time with foreign policy. Get over it." He walked back his comments later that day, asserting there had been "absolutely no quid pro quo" and that Trump had withheld military aid to Ukraine over concerns of the country's corruption.

On October 29, 2019, Massachusetts representative Jim McGovern introduced a resolution referred to the House Rules Committee, which set forth the "format of open hearings in the House Intelligence Committee, including staff-led questioning of witnesses, and [authorization for] the public release of deposition transcripts". This resolution, formally authorizing the impeachment inquiry, was approved by the House by a vote of 232 to 196 on October 31, 2019. In November 2019, the House Intelligence Committee held a number of public hearings in which witnesses testified publicly. On November 13, Taylor and Kent testified publicly. Ambassador Marie Yovanovitch testified before the committee on November 15, 2019. Lieutenant Colonel Alexander Vindman, the National Security Council's head of European affairs, and Jennifer Williams, Vice President Mike Pence's chief European security adviser, testified together on the morning of November 19, 2019. Later that day, Kurt Volker, the former U.S. special representative for Ukraine, and Tim Morrison, the former national security presidential adviser on Europe and Russia, gave public testimony before the House Intelligence Committee. Also subpoenaed were Foreign Service officers Catherine Croft, Jennifer Williams, Christopher Anderson, and Suriya Jayanti.

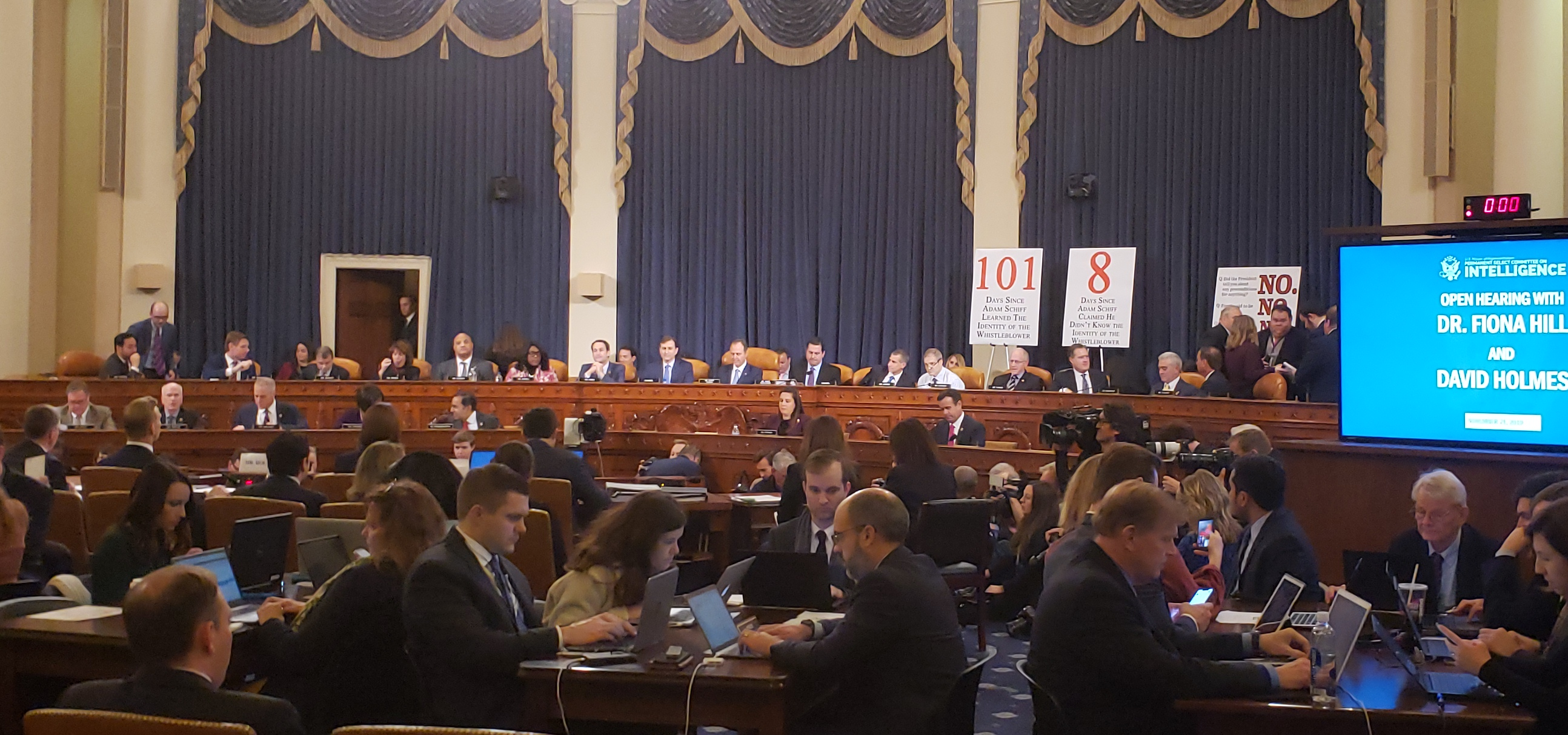
Open hearing testimony of Fiona Hill and David Holmes on November 21, 2019

On November 20, 2019, Ambassador Sondland testified that he conducted his work with Giuliani at the "express direction of the president", and that he understood a potential White House invitation for Zelenskyy to be contingent on Ukraine announcing investigations into the 2016 elections and Burisma. Later that day, Cooper and David Hale, the under secretary of state for political affairs, testified jointly before the committee. On November 21, 2019, Fiona Hill – who, until August 2019, was the top Russia expert on the National Security Council – criticized Republicans for promulgating the "fictional narrative" that Ukraine rather than Russia interfered in the 2016 election, asserting that the theory was planted by Russia and played into its hands. Testifying alongside Hill was David Holmes, the current head of political affairs in the U.S. Embassy in Ukraine.

On December 3, the House Intelligence Committee voted 13–9 along party lines to adopt a final report and also send it to the House Judiciary Committee. The report's preface states:

[T]he impeachment inquiry has found that President Trump, personally and acting through agents within and outside of the U.S. government, solicited the interference of a foreign government, Ukraine, to benefit his reelection. In furtherance of this scheme, President Trump conditioned official acts on a public announcement by the new Ukrainian President, Volodymyr Zelenskyy, of politically-motivated investigations, including one into President Trump's domestic political opponent. In pressuring President Zelenskyy to carry out his demand, President Trump withheld a White House meeting desperately sought by the Ukrainian President, and critical U.S. military assistance to fight Russian aggression in eastern Ukraine.

The Republicans of the House committees had released a countering report the previous day, saying in part that the evidence did not support the accusations: "The evidence presented does not prove any of these Democrat allegations, and none of the Democrats' witnesses testified to having evidence of bribery, extortion, or any high crime or misdemeanor", said the draft report. This report also painted the push to impeachment as solely politically motivated – the report's executive summary stated, "The Democrats are trying to impeach a duly elected President based on the accusations and assumptions of unelected bureaucrats who disagreed with President Trump's policy initiatives and processes". During the inquiry, the Trump administration's public arguments were limited to assertions that the president had done nothing wrong and that the process was unfair.

== Impeachment ==
=== Judiciary Committee hearings ===
Impeachment of Donald J. Trump, President of the United States—Report of the Committee on the Judiciary, House of Representatives

On December 5, Speaker Pelosi authorized the Judiciary Committee to begin drafting articles of impeachment.

A set of impeachment hearings was brought before the Judiciary Committee, with Trump and his lawyers being invited to attend. The administration declined as the President was scheduled to attend a NATO summit in London. In a second letter on December 6, Cipollone again said that the White House would not offer a defense or otherwise participate in the impeachment inquiry, writing to chairman Jerry Nadler, "As you know, your impeachment inquiry is completely baseless and has violated basic principles of due process and fundamental fairness." Nadler responded in a statement, "We gave President Trump a fair opportunity to question witnesses and present his own to address the overwhelming evidence before us. After listening to him complain about the impeachment process, we had hoped that he might accept our invitation."

The first hearing, held on December 4, 2019, was an academic discussion on the definition of an impeachable offense. The witnesses invited by Democrats were law professors Noah Feldman from Harvard, Pamela S. Karlan from Stanford, and Michael Gerhardt from the University of North Carolina. Republicans invited Jonathan Turley, a constitutional scholar at George Washington University; Turley, who had testified in favor of the impeachment of President Bill Clinton in 1999, testified against impeaching Trump, citing a lack of evidence. It was observed that he contradicted his own opinion on impeachment from when Clinton was on trial.

Potential articles of impeachment outlined during the hearing include abuse of power for arranging a quid pro quo with the president of Ukraine, obstruction of Congress for hindering the House's investigation, and obstruction of justice for attempting to dismiss Robert Mueller during his investigation of Russian interference in the 2016 election. On December 5, Pelosi requested that the House Judiciary Committee draft articles of impeachment. After the vote, Pelosi said that, while this was "a great day for the Constitution", it was "a sad day for America". She also said, "I could not be prouder or more inspired by the moral courage of the House Democrats. We never asked one of them how they were going to vote. We never whipped this vote."

=== Articles of impeachment ===
Articles of impeachment read into the Congressional Record by Reading Clerk Joe Novotny

House Resolution 755—Articles of Impeachment Against President Donald J. Trump

On December 10, 2019, Democrats on the House Judiciary Committee announced they would levy two articles of impeachment, designated H. Res. 755: (1) abuse of power, and (2) obstruction of Congress, in its investigation of the President's conduct regarding Ukraine. Draft text of the articles was released later that day, as well as a report by the judiciary committee outlining the constitutional case for impeachment and asserting that "impeachment is part of democratic governance". The committee planned to vote on the articles on December 12, but postponed it to the next day after the 14-hour partisan debate on the final versions of the articles lasted until after 11:00 p.m. EST. On December 13, the Judiciary Committee voted along party lines to pass both articles of impeachment; both articles passed 23–17, with all Democrats present voting in support and all Republicans voting in opposition. Democrat Ted Lieu was ill and not present to vote.

On December 16, the House Judiciary Committee released a 658-page report on the articles of impeachment, specifying criminal bribery and wire fraud charges as part of the abuse of power article. The articles were forwarded to the full House for debate and a vote on whether to impeach the president on December 18.

House Judiciary Committee vote on whether to report House Resolution 755 favorably to the House of Representatives
Party	Article I (Abuse of power)				Article II (Obstruction of Congress)			
Party	Aye/Yes	Nay	Present	Not voting	Aye/Yes	Nay	Present	Not voting
Democratic (24)	23	–	–	1: Ted Lieu	23	–	–	1: Ted Lieu
Republican (17)	–	17	–	–	–	17	–	–
Total (41)	23	17	0	1	23	17	0	1
Result	Agreed to (Note: Agreement based on a simple majority. Of the 41 members, Ted Lieu, who represented California's 33rd, was ill and not present to vote, leaving 40 votes. Being an even number, half plus one is needed for a majority, yielding 21 as the number of Aye votes for agreement.)				Agreed to			

=== House vote ===
Article I, Section 2, Clause 5 of the U.S. Constitution states that "The House of Representatives ... shall have the sole Power of Impeachment."

Steny Hoyer's full statement ahead of house vote

On December 17, the House Rules Committee held a hearing to write the rules governing the debate over impeachment. The first of three votes was on the rules governing debate: 228 to 197, with all Republicans and two Democrats voting no. This was followed by six hours of debate. One of the highlights of this contentious event was Georgia representative Barry Loudermilk comparing the impeachment inquiry of President Trump to the trial of Jesus Christ, saying that the Christian savior was treated far better by the authorities. Maryland representative Steny Hoyer contributed closing arguments: "All of us feel a sense of loyalty to party ... It's what makes our two-party system function. It's what helps hold presidents and majorities accountable. But party loyalty must have its limits."

House votes on Article I and II of House Resolution 755

The formal impeachment vote in the House of Representatives took place on December 18, 2019. Shortly after 8:30 p.m. EST, both articles of impeachment passed. The votes for the charge of abuse of power were 230 in favor, 197 against, and 1 present: House Democrats all voted in support, except Collin Peterson and Jeff Van Drew, who voted against, and Tulsi Gabbard, who voted "present"; all House Republicans voted against, although Justin Amash, an independent who was previously Republican, voted in support of both articles. The votes for the charge of obstruction of Congress were 229 in favor, 198 against, and 1 present: all Democrats voted in support, except Peterson, Van Drew, and Jared Golden, who voted against; and Gabbard, who again voted "present"; all Republicans voted against.

Days before the impeachment vote, it was leaked that Jeff Van Drew was planning to switch parties from Democratic to Republican. A day after the vote, he officially announced that he was switching parties.

Three representatives pending retirement did not vote: Republican Duncan D. Hunter, who was banned from voting under the House's rules after pleading guilty to illegally using campaign funds; Democrat José E. Serrano, who had a health setback after being diagnosed with Parkinson's disease earlier in the year; and Republican John Shimkus, who was visiting his son in Tanzania.

Voting results on House Resolution 755 (Impeaching Donald John Trump, President of the United States, for high crimes and misdemeanors)
Party	Article I (Abuse of power)				Article II (Obstruction of Congress)			
Party	Yea	Nay	Present	Not voting	Yea	Nay	Present	Not voting
Democratic (233)	229	2: Collin Peterson; Jeff Van Drew	1: Tulsi Gabbard	1: José E. Serrano	228	3: Collin Peterson; Jeff Van Drew; Jared Golden	1: Tulsi Gabbard	1: José E. Serrano
Republican (197)	–	195	–	2: John Shimkus; Duncan D. Hunter	–	195	–	2: John Shimkus; Duncan D. Hunter
Independent (1)	1: Justin Amash	–	–	–	1: Justin Amash	–	–	–
Total (435) (Note: Of the 435 House seats for the 116th Congress's first session, four were vacant: Maryland's 7th, New York's 27th, Wisconsin's 7th, and California's 25th. Three members were not present for the vote: Duncan D. Hunter from California's 50th was banned from voting, José E. Serrano from New York's 15th was prevented from voting due to medical issues; and John Shimkus from Illinois's 15th was on personal trip to Tanzania. This left 428 votes but, being an even number, half plus one is needed for a majority, yielding 215 as the number of yea votes for adoption.)	230	197	1	3	229	198	1	3
Result	Adopted (Note: Adoption based on a simple majority.)				Adopted			

Full list of member votes on House Resolution 755
District	Member	Party	Article I	Article II
Alabama 1	Bradley Byrne	Republican	Nay	Nay
Alabama 2	Martha Roby	Republican	Nay	Nay
Alabama 3	Mike Rogers	Republican	Nay	Nay
Alabama 4	Robert Aderholt	Republican	Nay	Nay
Alabama 5	Mo Brooks	Republican	Nay	Nay
Alabama 6	Gary Palmer	Republican	Nay	Nay
Alabama 7	Terri Sewell	Democratic	Yea	Yea
Alaska at-large	Don Young	Republican	Nay	Nay
Arizona 1	Tom O'Halleran	Democratic	Yea	Yea
Arizona 2	Ann Kirkpatrick	Democratic	Yea	Yea
Arizona 3	Raúl Grijalva	Democratic	Yea	Yea
Arizona 4	Paul Gosar	Republican	Nay	Nay
Arizona 5	Andy Biggs	Republican	Nay	Nay
Arizona 6	David Schweikert	Republican	Nay	Nay
Arizona 7	Ruben Gallego	Democratic	Yea	Yea
Arizona 8	Debbie Lesko	Republican	Nay	Nay
Arizona 9	Greg Stanton	Democratic	Yea	Yea
Arkansas 1	Rick Crawford	Republican	Nay	Nay
Arkansas 2	French Hill	Republican	Nay	Nay
Arkansas 3	Steve Womack	Republican	Nay	Nay
Arkansas 4	Bruce Westerman	Republican	Nay	Nay
California 1	Doug LaMalfa	Republican	Nay	Nay
California 2	Jared Huffman	Democratic	Yea	Yea
California 3	John Garamendi	Democratic	Yea	Yea
California 4	Tom McClintock	Republican	Nay	Nay
California 5	Mike Thompson	Democratic	Yea	Yea
California 6	Doris Matsui	Democratic	Yea	Yea
California 7	Ami Bera	Democratic	Yea	Yea
California 8	Paul Cook	Republican	Nay	Nay
California 9	Jerry McNerney	Democratic	Yea	Yea
California 10	Josh Harder	Democratic	Yea	Yea
California 11	Mark DeSaulnier	Democratic	Yea	Yea
California 12	Nancy Pelosi	Democratic	Yea	Yea
California 13	Barbara Lee	Democratic	Yea	Yea
California 14	Jackie Speier	Democratic	Yea	Yea
California 15	Eric Swalwell	Democratic	Yea	Yea
California 16	Jim Costa	Democratic	Yea	Yea
California 17	Ro Khanna	Democratic	Yea	Yea
California 18	Anna Eshoo	Democratic	Yea	Yea
California 19	Zoe Lofgren	Democratic	Yea	Yea
California 20	Jimmy Panetta	Democratic	Yea	Yea
California 21	TJ Cox	Democratic	Yea	Yea
California 22	Devin Nunes	Republican	Nay	Nay
California 23	Kevin McCarthy	Republican	Nay	Nay
California 24	Salud Carbajal	Democratic	Yea	Yea
California 26	Julia Brownley	Democratic	Yea	Yea
California 27	Judy Chu	Democratic	Yea	Yea
California 28	Adam Schiff	Democratic	Yea	Yea
California 29	Tony Cárdenas	Democratic	Yea	Yea
California 30	Brad Sherman	Democratic	Yea	Yea
California 31	Pete Aguilar	Democratic	Yea	Yea
California 32	Grace Napolitano	Democratic	Yea	Yea
California 33	Ted Lieu	Democratic	Yea	Yea
California 34	Jimmy Gomez	Democratic	Yea	Yea
California 35	Norma Torres	Democratic	Yea	Yea
California 36	Raul Ruiz	Democratic	Yea	Yea
California 37	Karen Bass	Democratic	Yea	Yea
California 38	Linda Sánchez	Democratic	Yea	Yea
California 39	Gil Cisneros	Democratic	Yea	Yea
California 40	Lucille Roybal-Allard	Democratic	Yea	Yea
California 41	Mark Takano	Democratic	Yea	Yea
California 42	Ken Calvert	Republican	Nay	Nay
California 43	Maxine Waters	Democratic	Yea	Yea
California 44	Nanette Barragán	Democratic	Yea	Yea
California 45	Katie Porter	Democratic	Yea	Yea
California 46	Lou Correa	Democratic	Yea	Yea
California 47	Alan Lowenthal	Democratic	Yea	Yea
California 48	Harley Rouda	Democratic	Yea	Yea
California 49	Mike Levin	Democratic	Yea	Yea
California 50	Duncan D. Hunter	Republican	Not voting	Not voting
California 51	Juan Vargas	Democratic	Yea	Yea
California 52	Scott Peters	Democratic	Yea	Yea
California 53	Susan Davis	Democratic	Yea	Yea
Colorado 1	Diana DeGette	Democratic	Yea	Yea
Colorado 2	Joe Neguse	Democratic	Yea	Yea
Colorado 3	Scott Tipton	Republican	Nay	Nay
Colorado 4	Ken Buck	Republican	Nay	Nay
Colorado 5	Doug Lamborn	Republican	Nay	Nay
Colorado 6	Jason Crow	Democratic	Yea	Yea
Colorado 7	Ed Perlmutter	Democratic	Yea	Yea
Connecticut 1	John B. Larson	Democratic	Yea	Yea
Connecticut 2	Joe Courtney	Democratic	Yea	Yea
Connecticut 3	Rosa DeLauro	Democratic	Yea	Yea
Connecticut 4	Jim Himes	Democratic	Yea	Yea
Connecticut 5	Jahana Hayes	Democratic	Yea	Yea
Delaware at-large	Lisa Blunt Rochester	Democratic	Yea	Yea
Florida 1	Matt Gaetz	Republican	Nay	Nay
Florida 2	Neal Dunn	Republican	Nay	Nay
Florida 3	Ted Yoho	Republican	Nay	Nay
Florida 4	John Rutherford	Republican	Nay	Nay
Florida 5	Al Lawson	Democratic	Yea	Yea
Florida 6	Michael Waltz	Republican	Nay	Nay
Florida 7	Stephanie Murphy	Democratic	Yea	Yea
Florida 8	Bill Posey	Republican	Nay	Nay
Florida 9	Darren Soto	Democratic	Yea	Yea
Florida 10	Val Demings	Democratic	Yea	Yea
Florida 11	Daniel Webster	Republican	Nay	Nay
Florida 12	Gus Bilirakis	Republican	Nay	Nay
Florida 13	Charlie Crist	Democratic	Yea	Yea
Florida 14	Kathy Castor	Democratic	Yea	Yea
Florida 15	Ross Spano	Republican	Nay	Nay
Florida 16	Vern Buchanan	Republican	Nay	Nay
Florida 17	Greg Steube	Republican	Nay	Nay
Florida 18	Brian Mast	Republican	Nay	Nay
Florida 19	Francis Rooney	Republican	Nay	Nay
Florida 20	Alcee Hastings	Democratic	Yea	Yea
Florida 21	Lois Frankel	Democratic	Yea	Yea
Florida 22	Ted Deutch	Democratic	Yea	Yea
Florida 23	Debbie Wasserman Schultz	Democratic	Yea	Yea
Florida 24	Frederica Wilson	Democratic	Yea	Yea
Florida 25	Mario Díaz-Balart	Republican	Nay	Nay
Florida 26	Debbie Mucarsel-Powell	Democratic	Yea	Yea
Florida 27	Donna Shalala	Democratic	Yea	Yea
Georgia 1	Buddy Carter	Republican	Nay	Nay
Georgia 2	Sanford Bishop	Democratic	Yea	Yea
Georgia 3	Drew Ferguson	Republican	Nay	Nay
Georgia 4	Hank Johnson	Democratic	Yea	Yea
Georgia 5	John Lewis	Democratic	Yea	Yea
Georgia 6	Lucy McBath	Democratic	Yea	Yea
Georgia 7	Rob Woodall	Republican	Nay	Nay
Georgia 8	Austin Scott	Republican	Nay	Nay
Georgia 9	Doug Collins	Republican	Nay	Nay
Georgia 10	Jody Hice	Republican	Nay	Nay
Georgia 11	Barry Loudermilk	Republican	Nay	Nay
Georgia 12	Rick W. Allen	Republican	Nay	Nay
Georgia 13	David Scott	Democratic	Yea	Yea
Georgia 14	Tom Graves	Republican	Nay	Nay
Hawaii 1	Ed Case	Democratic	Yea	Yea
Hawaii 2	Tulsi Gabbard	Democratic	Present	Present
Idaho 1	Russ Fulcher	Republican	Nay	Nay
Idaho 2	Mike Simpson	Republican	Nay	Nay
Illinois 1	Bobby Rush	Democratic	Yea	Yea
Illinois 2	Robin Kelly	Democratic	Yea	Yea
Illinois 3	Dan Lipinski	Democratic	Yea	Yea
Illinois 4	Jesús "Chuy" García	Democratic	Yea	Yea
Illinois 5	Mike Quigley	Democratic	Yea	Yea
Illinois 6	Sean Casten	Democratic	Yea	Yea
Illinois 7	Danny K. Davis	Democratic	Yea	Yea
Illinois 8	Raja Krishnamoorthi	Democratic	Yea	Yea
Illinois 9	Jan Schakowsky	Democratic	Yea	Yea
Illinois 10	Brad Schneider	Democratic	Yea	Yea
Illinois 11	Bill Foster	Democratic	Yea	Yea
Illinois 12	Mike Bost	Republican	Nay	Nay
Illinois 13	Rodney Davis	Republican	Nay	Nay
Illinois 14	Lauren Underwood	Democratic	Yea	Yea
Illinois 15	John Shimkus	Republican	Not voting	Not voting
Illinois 16	Adam Kinzinger	Republican	Nay	Nay
Illinois 17	Cheri Bustos	Democratic	Yea	Yea
Illinois 18	Darin LaHood	Republican	Nay	Nay
Indiana 1	Pete Visclosky	Democratic	Yea	Yea
Indiana 2	Jackie Walorski	Republican	Nay	Nay
Indiana 3	Jim Banks	Republican	Nay	Nay
Indiana 4	Jim Baird	Republican	Nay	Nay
Indiana 5	Susan Brooks	Republican	Nay	Nay
Indiana 6	Greg Pence	Republican	Nay	Nay
Indiana 7	André Carson	Democratic	Yea	Yea
Indiana 8	Larry Bucshon	Republican	Nay	Nay
Indiana 9	Trey Hollingsworth	Republican	Nay	Nay
Iowa 1	Abby Finkenauer	Democratic	Yea	Yea
Iowa 2	Dave Loebsack	Democratic	Yea	Yea
Iowa 3	Cindy Axne	Democratic	Yea	Yea
Iowa 4	Steve King	Republican	Nay	Nay
Kansas 1	Roger Marshall	Republican	Nay	Nay
Kansas 2	Steve Watkins	Republican	Nay	Nay
Kansas 3	Sharice Davids	Democratic	Yea	Yea
Kansas 4	Ron Estes	Republican	Nay	Nay
Kentucky 1	James Comer	Republican	Nay	Nay
Kentucky 2	Brett Guthrie	Republican	Nay	Nay
Kentucky 3	John Yarmuth	Democratic	Yea	Yea
Kentucky 4	Thomas Massie	Republican	Nay	Nay
Kentucky 5	Hal Rogers	Republican	Nay	Nay
Kentucky 6	Andy Barr	Republican	Nay	Nay
Louisiana 1	Steve Scalise	Republican	Nay	Nay
Louisiana 2	Cedric Richmond	Democratic	Yea	Yea
Louisiana 3	Clay Higgins	Republican	Nay	Nay
Louisiana 4	Mike Johnson	Republican	Nay	Nay
Louisiana 5	Ralph Abraham	Republican	Nay	Nay
Louisiana 6	Garret Graves	Republican	Nay	Nay
Maine 1	Chellie Pingree	Democratic	Yea	Yea
Maine 2	Jared Golden	Democratic	Yea	Nay
Maryland 1	Andy Harris	Republican	Nay	Nay
Maryland 2	Dutch Ruppersberger	Democratic	Yea	Yea
Maryland 3	John Sarbanes	Democratic	Yea	Yea
Maryland 4	Anthony Brown	Democratic	Yea	Yea
Maryland 5	Steny Hoyer	Democratic	Yea	Yea
Maryland 6	David Trone	Democratic	Yea	Yea
Maryland 8	Jamie Raskin	Democratic	Yea	Yea
Massachusetts 1	Richard Neal	Democratic	Yea	Yea
Massachusetts 2	Jim McGovern	Democratic	Yea	Yea
Massachusetts 3	Lori Trahan	Democratic	Yea	Yea
Massachusetts 4	Joe Kennedy III	Democratic	Yea	Yea
Massachusetts 5	Katherine Clark	Democratic	Yea	Yea
Massachusetts 6	Seth Moulton	Democratic	Yea	Yea
Massachusetts 7	Ayanna Pressley	Democratic	Yea	Yea
Massachusetts 8	Stephen F. Lynch	Democratic	Yea	Yea
Massachusetts 9	Bill Keating	Democratic	Yea	Yea
Michigan 1	Jack Bergman	Republican	Nay	Nay
Michigan 2	Bill Huizenga	Republican	Nay	Nay
Michigan 3	Justin Amash	Independent	Yea	Yea
Michigan 4	John Moolenaar	Republican	Nay	Nay
Michigan 5	Dan Kildee	Democratic	Yea	Yea
Michigan 6	Fred Upton	Republican	Nay	Nay
Michigan 7	Tim Walberg	Republican	Nay	Nay
Michigan 8	Elissa Slotkin	Democratic	Yea	Yea
Michigan 9	Andy Levin	Democratic	Yea	Yea
Michigan 10	Paul Mitchell	Republican	Nay	Nay
Michigan 11	Haley Stevens	Democratic	Yea	Yea
Michigan 12	Debbie Dingell	Democratic	Yea	Yea
Michigan 13	Rashida Tlaib	Democratic	Yea	Yea
Michigan 14	Brenda Lawrence	Democratic	Yea	Yea
Minnesota 1	Jim Hagedorn	Republican	Nay	Nay
Minnesota 2	Angie Craig	Democratic	Yea	Yea
Minnesota 3	Dean Phillips	Democratic	Yea	Yea
Minnesota 4	Betty McCollum	Democratic	Yea	Yea
Minnesota 5	Ilhan Omar	Democratic	Yea	Yea
Minnesota 6	Tom Emmer	Republican	Nay	Nay
Minnesota 7	Collin Peterson	Democratic	Nay	Nay
Minnesota 8	Pete Stauber	Republican	Nay	Nay
Mississippi 1	Trent Kelly	Republican	Nay	Nay
Mississippi 2	Bennie Thompson	Democratic	Yea	Yea
Mississippi 3	Michael Guest	Republican	Nay	Nay
Mississippi 4	Steven Palazzo	Republican	Nay	Nay
Missouri 1	Lacy Clay	Democratic	Yea	Yea
Missouri 2	Ann Wagner	Republican	Nay	Nay
Missouri 3	Blaine Luetkemeyer	Republican	Nay	Nay
Missouri 4	Vicky Hartzler	Republican	Nay	Nay
Missouri 5	Emanuel Cleaver	Democratic	Yea	Yea
Missouri 6	Sam Graves	Republican	Nay	Nay
Missouri 7	Billy Long	Republican	Nay	Nay
Missouri 8	Jason Smith	Republican	Nay	Nay
Montana at-large	Greg Gianforte	Republican	Nay	Nay
Nebraska 1	Jeff Fortenberry	Republican	Nay	Nay
Nebraska 2	Don Bacon	Republican	Nay	Nay
Nebraska 3	Adrian Smith	Republican	Nay	Nay
Nevada 1	Dina Titus	Democratic	Yea	Yea
Nevada 2	Mark Amodei	Republican	Nay	Nay
Nevada 3	Susie Lee	Democratic	Yea	Yea
Nevada 4	Steven Horsford	Democratic	Yea	Yea
New Hampshire 1	Chris Pappas	Democratic	Yea	Yea
New Hampshire 2	Ann McLane Kuster	Democratic	Yea	Yea
New Jersey 1	Donald Norcross	Democratic	Yea	Yea
New Jersey 2	Jeff Van Drew	Democratic	Nay	Nay
New Jersey 3	Andy Kim	Democratic	Yea	Yea
New Jersey 4	Chris Smith	Republican	Nay	Nay
New Jersey 5	Josh Gottheimer	Democratic	Yea	Yea
New Jersey 6	Frank Pallone	Democratic	Yea	Yea
New Jersey 7	Tom Malinowski	Democratic	Yea	Yea
New Jersey 8	Albio Sires	Democratic	Yea	Yea
New Jersey 9	Bill Pascrell	Democratic	Yea	Yea
New Jersey 10	Donald Payne Jr.	Democratic	Yea	Yea
New Jersey 11	Mikie Sherrill	Democratic	Yea	Yea
New Jersey 12	Bonnie Watson Coleman	Democratic	Yea	Yea
New Mexico 1	Deb Haaland	Democratic	Yea	Yea
New Mexico 2	Xochitl Torres Small	Democratic	Yea	Yea
New Mexico 3	Ben Ray Luján	Democratic	Yea	Yea
New York 1	Lee Zeldin	Republican	Nay	Nay
New York 2	Peter T. King	Republican	Nay	Nay
New York 3	Thomas Suozzi	Democratic	Yea	Yea
New York 4	Kathleen Rice	Democratic	Yea	Yea
New York 5	Gregory Meeks	Democratic	Yea	Yea
New York 6	Grace Meng	Democratic	Yea	Yea
New York 7	Nydia Velázquez	Democratic	Yea	Yea
New York 8	Hakeem Jeffries	Democratic	Yea	Yea
New York 9	Yvette Clarke	Democratic	Yea	Yea
New York 10	Jerry Nadler	Democratic	Yea	Yea
New York 11	Max Rose	Democratic	Yea	Yea
New York 12	Carolyn Maloney	Democratic	Yea	Yea
New York 13	Adriano Espaillat	Democratic	Yea	Yea
New York 14	Alexandria Ocasio-Cortez	Democratic	Yea	Yea
New York 15	José E. Serrano	Democratic	Not voting	Not voting
New York 16	Eliot Engel	Democratic	Yea	Yea
New York 17	Nita Lowey	Democratic	Yea	Yea
New York 18	Sean Patrick Maloney	Democratic	Yea	Yea
New York 19	Antonio Delgado	Democratic	Yea	Yea
New York 20	Paul Tonko	Democratic	Yea	Yea
New York 21	Elise Stefanik	Republican	Nay	Nay
New York 22	Anthony Brindisi	Democratic	Yea	Yea
New York 23	Tom Reed	Republican	Nay	Nay
New York 24	John Katko	Republican	Nay	Nay
New York 25	Joseph Morelle	Democratic	Yea	Yea
New York 26	Brian Higgins	Democratic	Yea	Yea
North Carolina 1	G. K. Butterfield	Democratic	Yea	Yea
North Carolina 2	George Holding	Republican	Nay	Nay
North Carolina 3	Greg Murphy	Republican	Nay	Nay
North Carolina 4	David Price	Democratic	Yea	Yea
North Carolina 5	Virginia Foxx	Republican	Nay	Nay
North Carolina 6	Mark Walker	Republican	Nay	Nay
North Carolina 7	David Rouzer	Republican	Nay	Nay
North Carolina 8	Richard Hudson	Republican	Nay	Nay
North Carolina 9	Dan Bishop	Republican	Nay	Nay
North Carolina 10	Patrick McHenry	Republican	Nay	Nay
North Carolina 11	Mark Meadows	Republican	Nay	Nay
North Carolina 12	Alma Adams	Democratic	Yea	Yea
North Carolina 13	Ted Budd	Republican	Nay	Nay
North Dakota at-large	Kelly Armstrong	Republican	Nay	Nay
Ohio 1	Steve Chabot	Republican	Nay	Nay
Ohio 2	Brad Wenstrup	Republican	Nay	Nay
Ohio 3	Joyce Beatty	Democratic	Yea	Yea
Ohio 4	Jim Jordan	Republican	Nay	Nay
Ohio 5	Bob Latta	Republican	Nay	Nay
Ohio 6	Bill Johnson	Republican	Nay	Nay
Ohio 7	Bob Gibbs	Republican	Nay	Nay
Ohio 8	Warren Davidson	Republican	Nay	Nay
Ohio 9	Marcy Kaptur	Democratic	Yea	Yea
Ohio 10	Mike Turner	Republican	Nay	Nay
Ohio 11	Marcia Fudge	Democratic	Yea	Yea
Ohio 12	Troy Balderson	Republican	Nay	Nay
Ohio 13	Tim Ryan	Democratic	Yea	Yea
Ohio 14	David Joyce	Republican	Nay	Nay
Ohio 15	Steve Stivers	Republican	Nay	Nay
Ohio 16	Anthony Gonzalez	Republican	Nay	Nay
Oklahoma 1	Kevin Hern	Republican	Nay	Nay
Oklahoma 2	Markwayne Mullin	Republican	Nay	Nay
Oklahoma 3	Frank Lucas	Republican	Nay	Nay
Oklahoma 4	Tom Cole	Republican	Nay	Nay
Oklahoma 5	Kendra Horn	Democratic	Yea	Yea
Oregon 1	Suzanne Bonamici	Democratic	Yea	Yea
Oregon 2	Greg Walden	Republican	Nay	Nay
Oregon 3	Earl Blumenauer	Democratic	Yea	Yea
Oregon 4	Peter DeFazio	Democratic	Yea	Yea
Oregon 5	Kurt Schrader	Democratic	Yea	Yea
Pennsylvania 1	Brian Fitzpatrick	Republican	Nay	Nay
Pennsylvania 2	Brendan Boyle	Democratic	Yea	Yea
Pennsylvania 3	Dwight Evans	Democratic	Yea	Yea
Pennsylvania 4	Madeleine Dean	Democratic	Yea	Yea
Pennsylvania 5	Mary Gay Scanlon	Democratic	Yea	Yea
Pennsylvania 6	Chrissy Houlahan	Democratic	Yea	Yea
Pennsylvania 7	Susan Wild	Democratic	Yea	Yea
Pennsylvania 8	Matt Cartwright	Democratic	Yea	Yea
Pennsylvania 9	Dan Meuser	Republican	Nay	Nay
Pennsylvania 10	Scott Perry	Republican	Nay	Nay
Pennsylvania 11	Lloyd Smucker	Republican	Nay	Nay
Pennsylvania 12	Fred Keller	Republican	Nay	Nay
Pennsylvania 13	John Joyce	Republican	Nay	Nay
Pennsylvania 14	Guy Reschenthaler	Republican	Nay	Nay
Pennsylvania 15	Glenn Thompson	Republican	Nay	Nay
Pennsylvania 16	Mike Kelly	Republican	Nay	Nay
Pennsylvania 17	Conor Lamb	Democratic	Yea	Yea
Pennsylvania 18	Mike Doyle	Democratic	Yea	Yea
Rhode Island 1	David Cicilline	Democratic	Yea	Yea
Rhode Island 2	James Langevin	Democratic	Yea	Yea
South Carolina 1	Joe Cunningham	Democratic	Yea	Yea
South Carolina 2	Joe Wilson	Republican	Nay	Nay
South Carolina 3	Jeff Duncan	Republican	Nay	Nay
South Carolina 4	William Timmons	Republican	Nay	Nay
South Carolina 5	Ralph Norman	Republican	Nay	Nay
South Carolina 6	Jim Clyburn	Democratic	Yea	Yea
South Carolina 7	Tom Rice	Republican	Nay	Nay
South Dakota at-large	Dusty Johnson	Republican	Nay	Nay
Tennessee 1	Phil Roe	Republican	Nay	Nay
Tennessee 2	Tim Burchett	Republican	Nay	Nay
Tennessee 3	Chuck Fleischmann	Republican	Nay	Nay
Tennessee 4	Scott DesJarlais	Republican	Nay	Nay
Tennessee 5	Jim Cooper	Democratic	Yea	Yea
Tennessee 6	John Rose	Republican	Nay	Nay
Tennessee 7	Mark E. Green	Republican	Nay	Nay
Tennessee 8	David Kustoff	Republican	Nay	Nay
Tennessee 9	Steve Cohen	Democratic	Yea	Yea
Texas 1	Louie Gohmert	Republican	Nay	Nay
Texas 2	Dan Crenshaw	Republican	Nay	Nay
Texas 3	Van Taylor	Republican	Nay	Nay
Texas 4	John Ratcliffe	Republican	Nay	Nay
Texas 5	Lance Gooden	Republican	Nay	Nay
Texas 6	Ron Wright	Republican	Nay	Nay
Texas 7	Lizzie Pannill Fletcher	Democratic	Yea	Yea
Texas 8	Kevin Brady	Republican	Nay	Nay
Texas 9	Al Green	Democratic	Yea	Yea
Texas 10	Michael McCaul	Republican	Nay	Nay
Texas 11	Mike Conaway	Republican	Nay	Nay
Texas 12	Kay Granger	Republican	Nay	Nay
Texas 13	Mac Thornberry	Republican	Nay	Nay
Texas 14	Randy Weber	Republican	Nay	Nay
Texas 15	Vicente Gonzalez	Democratic	Yea	Yea
Texas 16	Veronica Escobar	Democratic	Yea	Yea
Texas 17	Bill Flores	Republican	Nay	Nay
Texas 18	Sheila Jackson Lee	Democratic	Yea	Yea
Texas 19	Jodey Arrington	Republican	Nay	Nay
Texas 20	Joaquin Castro	Democratic	Yea	Yea
Texas 21	Chip Roy	Republican	Nay	Nay
Texas 22	Pete Olson	Republican	Nay	Nay
Texas 23	Will Hurd	Republican	Nay	Nay
Texas 24	Kenny Marchant	Republican	Nay	Nay
Texas 25	Roger Williams	Republican	Nay	Nay
Texas 26	Michael C. Burgess	Republican	Nay	Nay
Texas 27	Michael Cloud	Republican	Nay	Nay
Texas 28	Henry Cuellar	Democratic	Yea	Yea
Texas 29	Sylvia Garcia	Democratic	Yea	Yea
Texas 30	Eddie Bernice Johnson	Democratic	Yea	Yea
Texas 31	John Carter	Republican	Nay	Nay
Texas 32	Colin Allred	Democratic	Yea	Yea
Texas 33	Marc Veasey	Democratic	Yea	Yea
Texas 34	Filemon Vela Jr.	Democratic	Yea	Yea
Texas 35	Lloyd Doggett	Democratic	Yea	Yea
Texas 36	Brian Babin	Republican	Nay	Nay
Utah 1	Rob Bishop	Republican	Nay	Nay
Utah 2	Chris Stewart	Republican	Nay	Nay
Utah 3	John Curtis	Republican	Nay	Nay
Utah 4	Ben McAdams	Democratic	Yea	Yea
Vermont at-large	Peter Welch	Democratic	Yea	Yea
Virginia 1	Rob Wittman	Republican	Nay	Nay
Virginia 2	Elaine Luria	Democratic	Yea	Yea
Virginia 3	Bobby Scott	Democratic	Yea	Yea
Virginia 4	Donald McEachin	Democratic	Yea	Yea
Virginia 5	Denver Riggleman	Republican	Nay	Nay
Virginia 6	Ben Cline	Republican	Nay	Nay
Virginia 7	Abigail Spanberger	Democratic	Yea	Yea
Virginia 8	Don Beyer	Democratic	Yea	Yea
Virginia 9	Morgan Griffith	Republican	Nay	Nay
Virginia 10	Jennifer Wexton	Democratic	Yea	Yea
Virginia 11	Gerry Connolly	Democratic	Yea	Yea
Washington 1	Suzan DelBene	Democratic	Yea	Yea
Washington 2	Rick Larsen	Democratic	Yea	Yea
Washington 3	Jaime Herrera Beutler	Republican	Nay	Nay
Washington 4	Dan Newhouse	Republican	Nay	Nay
Washington 5	Cathy McMorris Rodgers	Republican	Nay	Nay
Washington 6	Derek Kilmer	Democratic	Yea	Yea
Washington 7	Pramila Jayapal	Democratic	Yea	Yea
Washington 8	Kim Schrier	Democratic	Yea	Yea
Washington 9	Adam Smith	Democratic	Yea	Yea
Washington 10	Denny Heck	Democratic	Yea	Yea
West Virginia 1	David McKinley	Republican	Nay	Nay
West Virginia 2	Alex Mooney	Republican	Nay	Nay
West Virginia 3	Carol Miller	Republican	Nay	Nay
Wisconsin 1	Bryan Steil	Republican	Nay	Nay
Wisconsin 2	Mark Pocan	Democratic	Yea	Yea
Wisconsin 3	Ron Kind	Democratic	Yea	Yea
Wisconsin 4	Gwen Moore	Democratic	Yea	Yea
Wisconsin 5	Jim Sensenbrenner	Republican	Nay	Nay
Wisconsin 6	Glenn Grothman	Republican	Nay	Nay
Wisconsin 8	Mike Gallagher	Republican	Nay	Nay
Wyoming at-large	Liz Cheney	Republican	Nay	Nay

=== Immediate response ===
A day after Trump's impeachment, the evangelical magazine Christianity Today published an editorial calling for his removal from office, stating that the president "attempted to use his political power to coerce a foreign leader to harass and discredit one of the president's political opponents. That is not only a violation of the Constitution; more importantly, it is profoundly immoral." On December 21, conservative Bill Kristol and a group calling itself "Republicans for the Rule of Law" released an ad encouraging viewers to call their senators to demand top Trump officials be forced to testify in his impeachment trial.

Trump questioned the validity of the impeachment, citing Harvard law professor Noah Feldman, who argued that the impeachment technically had not taken place until the articles were handed to the Senate. Jonathan Turley later refuted this argument in an op-ed. Trump tweeted or retweeted over 20 messages criticizing Pelosi's handling of the impeachment during the first week of his holiday vacation to Mar-a-Lago. On Christmas Day, he tweeted:

Why should Crazy Nancy Pelosi, just because she has a slight majority in the House, be allowed to Impeach the President of the United States? Got ZERO Republican votes, there was no crime, the call with Ukraine was perfect, with "no pressure." She said it must be "bipartisan & overwhelming," but this Scam Impeachment was neither. Also, very unfair with no Due Process, proper representation, or witnesses. Now Pelosi is demanding everything the Republicans weren't allowed to have in the House. Dems want to run majority Republican Senate. Hypocrites!

Attorney George T. Conway III and others noted that if the relevant witnesses were not allowed to testify, Trump's defenders would be negatively affected by "the very evidence they sought to suppress".

=== Impasse and final vote ===
Prior to the House impeachment vote, Senate majority leader Mitch McConnell and Senate Judiciary Committee chairman Lindsey Graham expressed their intentions not to be impartial jurors, contrary to the oath they must take. McConnell said, "I'm not an impartial juror. This is a political process. There is not anything judicial about it. Impeachment is a political decision." Graham said, "I am trying to give a pretty clear signal I have made up my mind. I'm not trying to pretend to be a fair juror here ... I will do everything I can to make [the impeachment trial] die quickly."

On December 15, with the support of all 47 Senate Democrats, Senate minority leader Charles Schumer wrote a letter to McConnell calling for Mick Mulvaney, Robert Blair, (Note: One of Mulvaney's top aides until being promoted by Trump on December 23 to a special representative for global telecommunications policy.) John Bolton, (Note: The former national security advisor did not attend his scheduled House deposition on November 7, 2019, and threatened to take legal action if he was subpoenaed. According to a House Intelligence Committee official, this is evidence of the president's obstruction of Congress. On January 6, 2020, Bolton said that he would be willing to testify in the Senate trial if subpoenaed. However, Trump has said that he would invoke executive privilege to keep him from testifying.) and Michael Duffey to testify, suggesting that pre-trial proceedings take place on January 6, 2020. Two days later, McConnell rejected the call for witnesses to testify, saying that the Senate's role is simply to act as "judge and jury" and not to aid the impeachment process. He also suggested that witnesses be called during the trial, as had happened after Clinton's impeachment. (Note: Graham also proposed that the trial "use the Clinton model, where you ... let the House managers ... make the argument, let the president make his argument why the two articles are flawed, and then we'll decide whether we want witnesses.") (Note: Senators Susan Collins and Mitt Romney expressed their openness to calling witnesses. McConnell, Graham, Murkowski, and Collins suggested that this happen later in the trial, with McConnell citing the 100–0 agreement on a similar process following Clinton's impeachment.) Schumer said that he "did not hear a single sentence, a single argument as to why the witnesses I suggested should not give testimony", citing bipartisan public support for testimony which could fill in gaps caused by Trump having prevented his staff from testifying in the House investigation. On January 2, 2020, Schumer called newly unredacted emails from Trump administration officials "a devastating blow to Senator McConnell's push to have a trial without the documents and witnesses we've requested". (Note: A further 20 emails remain fully undisclosed.) At least four Republican senators needed to vote with Democrats for witnesses to be called. Republicans suggested calling Joe and Hunter Biden to testify; the former stated his objection to this, but said he would obey a subpoena. Rudy Giuliani stated his willingness to testify or even try the impeachment "as a racketeering case", despite being Trump's personal attorney and allegedly attempting to help him politically while searching for evidence against the Bidens in Ukraine. On January 10, 2020, Trump told Laura Ingraham of Fox News that he would likely invoke executive privilege to keep Bolton from testifying "for the sake of the office".

On December 18, 2019, the day of the impeachment, Pelosi declined to comment on when the impeachment resolution would be transmitted to the Senate, stating, "So far we haven't seen anything that looks fair to us." The following day, McConnell met with Schumer briefly to discuss the trial. After the Senate reconvened from its holiday break, Graham proposed that he and McConnell "change the rules of the Senate so we could start the trial without [Pelosi], if necessary". On January 7, 2020, McConnell announced he had the caucus backing to pass a blueprint for the trial, which discussed witnesses and evidence after the opening arguments. Pelosi called for the resolution to be published before she could proceed with the next steps, but McConnell asserted that the House had no leverage and that there would be no negotiating over the trial. This prompted several Democratic senators to voice their readiness to have the trial begin. On January 9, Pelosi said she would deliver the articles soon, but continued to cite a need for Republican transparency in the Senate; that same day, McConnell informed members of his caucus that he expected the trial to begin the next week, and Senator Josh Hawley announced that McConnell had signed on as a co-sponsor to his resolution to dismiss articles of impeachment not sent to the Senate within 25 days. On January 10, Pelosi announced she had "asked Judiciary Committee Chairman Jerry Nadler to be prepared to bring to the Floor next week a resolution to appoint managers and transmit articles of impeachment to the Senate".

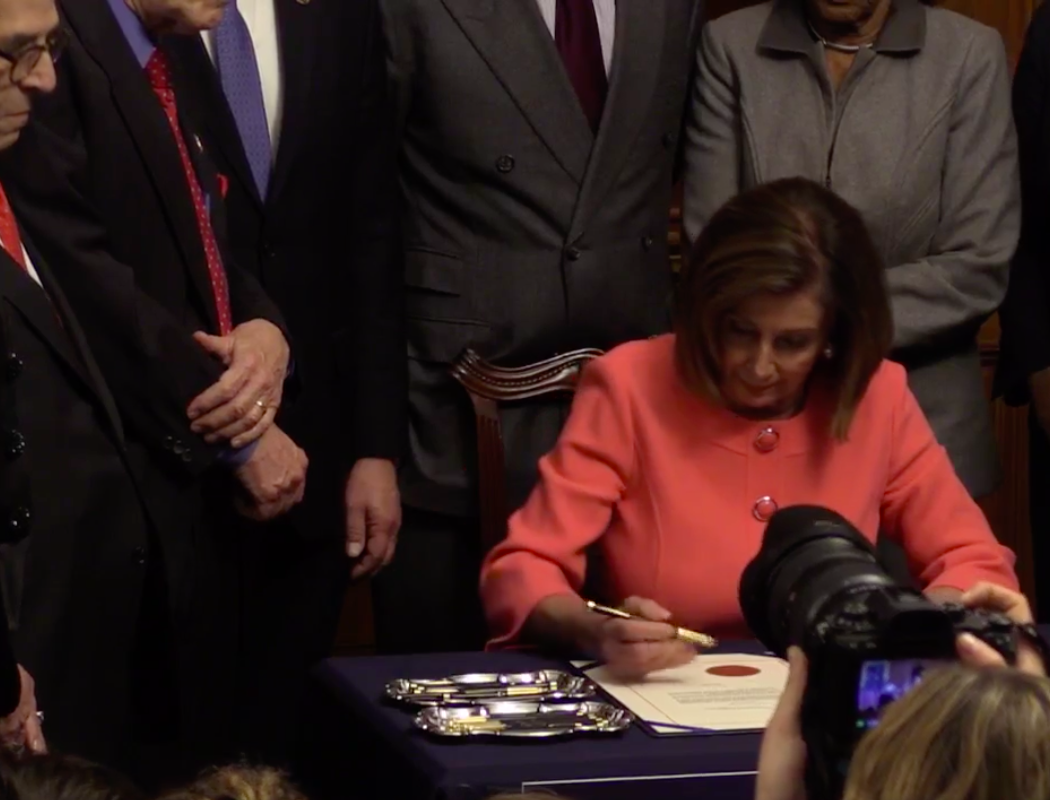
Nancy Pelosi endorsing the articles of impeachment on January 15, 2020

On January 14, 2020, Pelosi announced the House managers who would prosecute the case in the Senate. On January 15, the House voted on Resolution 798, which appointed the impeachment managers and approved the articles of impeachment to be sent to the Senate. Later that afternoon, Pelosi held a rare public engrossment ceremony, followed by a stately procession of the managers and other House officers across the Capitol building, where the third impeachment of a U.S. president was announced to the Senate. Except for the managers, who would conduct the trial, the House's involvement in the impeachment process came to an end.

Voting results on House Resolution 798 (Appointing and authorizing managers for the impeachment trial of Donald John Trump, President of the United States)
Party	Yea	Nay	Present	Not voting
Democratic (232)	227	1: Collin Peterson	–	4: Lacy Clay; Ann Kirkpatrick; Tulsi Gabbard; John Lewis
Republican (197)	–	192	–	5: Kenny Marchant; Rick Crawford; Debbie Lesko; Tom McClintock; Mike Simpson
Independent (1)	1: Justin Amash	–	–	–
Total (435) (Note: Of the 435 House seats for the 116th Congress's first session, five were vacant: Maryland's 7th, New York's 27th, Wisconsin's 7th, California's 25th, and California's 50th. Nine members were not present for the vote, four Democrats and five Republicans: Lacy Clay from Missouri's 1st, Ann Kirkpatrick from Arizona's 2nd, Tulsi Gabbard from Hawaii's 2nd, John Lewis from Georgia's 5th, Kenny Marchant from Texas's 24th, Rick Crawford from Arkansas's 2nd, Debbie Lesko from Arizona's 8th, Tom McClintock from California's 4th, and Mike Simpson Idaho's 2nd. This left 421 votes, half of which rounded up yields 211 as the number of yea votes for adoption.)	228	193	0	9
Result	Adopted			

== Trial ==
=== Preparation ===
While the impeachment inquiry was underway, Senate majority leader Mitch McConnell started planning a possible trial. On October 8, 2019, he led a meeting on the subject, advising his caucus to say that they opposed the House process and as little else as possible. In November, he shot down the idea that the articles of impeachment should be dismissed, stating that "the rules of impeachment are very clear, we'll have to have a trial." On December 12, as the articles were being considered by the House Judiciary Committee, McConnell met with White House counsel Pat Cipollone and Director of Legislative Affairs Eric Ueland. McConnell stated later that day, "Everything I do during this I'm coordinating with the White House counsel. There will be no difference between the president's position and [ours] ... I'm going to take my cues from the president's lawyers." McConnell added that the coordination with the White House would also pertain to whether witnesses would be allowed to testify, and told Sean Hannity of Fox News that there was no chance Trump would be convicted, expressing his hope that all Senate Republicans would acquit the president of both charges. Republican senators Lisa Murkowski and Susan Collins criticized McConnell's comments regarding coordinating with the White House. Collins was also critical of Democratic senator Elizabeth Warren for prejudging the trial.

=== Officers ===
The U.S. Constitution stipulates that the chief justice of the United States presides over impeachment proceedings when the president is tried. (Note: The office of Chief Justice is only mentioned once in the constitution and it is in relation to impeachment trials of the president.) The current chief justice was John Roberts, who was appointed by President George W. Bush in 2005. The House managers, acting as prosecutors for the case, were several Democratic representatives, consisting of Adam Schiff as lead manager, Jerry Nadler, Zoe Lofgren, Hakeem Jeffries, Val Demings, Jason Crow, and Sylvia Garcia. Trump named a defense team led by White House Counsel Pat Cipollone and his private attorney Jay Sekulow, who previously represented Trump in the Russia investigation. They were joined by celebrity law professor Alan Dershowitz, former independent counsel Kenneth Starr, former deputy independent counsel Robert Ray, former Florida attorney general Pam Bondi, and former federal prosecutor Jane Raskin.

=== Process and schedule ===
Article I, Section 3, Clause 6 of the U.S. Constitution states that "[t]he Senate shall have the sole Power to try all Impeachments." Per the Senate's impeachment rules adopted in 1986, the submission of the articles to the Senate initiated the trial. The articles were formally delivered on January 15, 2020, and were presented the following day.

At the end of the session on January 21, the Senate voted along party lines to pass McConnell's proposed trial rules and reject 11 amendments proposed by Democrats. McConnell stated that he wanted to follow the rules laid down during the Clinton trial in 1999, which had the morning reserved for Senate business and the afternoon hours reserved for the trial, but his resolution increased the hours spent per day on opening arguments from six to eight hours. The resolution also included provisions for a vote on whether to subpoena witnesses or documents after opening arguments.

The prosecution's opening arguments and presentation of evidence took place between January 22 and 24, 2020. On the first day, Schumer called the previous evening "a dark night for the Senate", when the White House, in response to a Freedom of Information Act lawsuit, released new evidence including a string of heavily redacted emails revealing details about how the Office of Management and Budget froze aid to Ukraine. (Note: The night after the Senate voted against subpoenaing witnesses in the trial, the Justice Department and a lawyer for the Office of Management and Budget acknowledged that some of the emails which remain undisclosed due to executive privilege contain details about why military aid to Ukraine was frozen.)

Trump's defense presentation began on January 25. The primary arguments were a lack of direct evidence of wrongdoing and that Democrats were attempting to use the impeachment to steal the 2020 election. (Note: Trump has also argued that the impeachment's timing was designed to hurt Bernie Sanders' presidential campaign by forcing him to focus on the trial instead.) Professor Alan Dershowitz argued that while a president can be impeached for committing a criminal act, irrespective of motive, the idea of a quid pro quo being a basis for removal from office requires that the 'quo' be something illegal, and that simply having mixed motives for requesting a legal act (an investigation into alleged corruption) would not be sufficient grounds for impeachment. He observed that all politicians act with an eye and motive toward re-election and that such motive neither makes illegal acts lawful nor unlawful act legal. This position was criticized by Democratic political consultant and commentator Paul Begala in an editorial that did not address the legality/illegality aspect of the analysis.

On January 31, after a planned debate session, the Senate voted 51–49 against allowing subpoenas to call witnesses, including former national security advisor John Bolton, (Note: In his book The Room Where It Happened, published later that year, Bulton describes Trump's involvement in the freezing of aid to Ukraine.) or documents. 51 Republican senators voted against calling witnesses, while 45 Democratic senators, two independents who typically voted Democratic, and two Republicans (Mitt Romney and Susan Collins) voted for witnesses.

=== Acquittal ===
Under the U.S. Constitution, two-thirds of the Senate is required to convict the president. The possible penalties are the removal from office and disqualification from holding office in the future. On February 5, 2020, the Senate acquitted Trump on both counts. The votes were 48–52 to convict on the first count and 47–53 to convict on the second count, both short of the two-thirds majority needed to convict, therefore resulting in acquittal. The votes were sharply divided along party lines. Mitt Romney became the first senator in history from an impeached president's party to vote to convict, voting "guilty" on the first count.

Voting results
Party	Article I (Abuse of power)		Article II (Obstruction of Congress)	
Party	Guilty	Not guilty	Guilty	Not guilty
Democratic (45)	45	–	45	–
Republican (53)	1: Mitt Romney	52	–	53
Independent (2)	2: Angus King; Bernie Sanders	–	2: Angus King; Bernie Sanders	–
Total (100)	48	52	47	53
Result	Not guilty (Note: Guilt based on "the Concurrence of two thirds of the Members present" according to the Constitution (Article 1, Section 3, Clause 6). There are 100 Senate seats (two per U.S. state) and all Senators were present at the trial. Two-thirds of 100 is 66.6̅, so 67 guilty votes are needed for a guilty verdict.)		Not guilty	

== Public opinion ==
Before the trial, in mid-January 2020, Americans were sharply divided on whether Trump should be removed from office, with Democrats largely supporting removal, Republicans largely opposing, and independents divided. A USA Today / Suffolk University poll conducted between December 10 and 14, 2019, found that 45% of respondents supported the impeachment and removal of Trump from office, while 51% opposed it. A CNN poll conducted from December 12 to 15 also found 45% supported impeachment and removal, compared to 47% who opposed the idea. A Gallup poll released on the day of Trump's impeachment found that the president's approval rating increased by six points during the impeachment process, while support for the impeachment fell. Another CNN poll conducted between January 16 and 19, 2020, found that 51% supported Trump's removal from office, compared to 45% who opposed it. An NBC / Wall Street Journal poll released on January 2, 2020, showed 46% favored removal from office and 49% opposed, with the in favor/opposed being almost exclusively along party lines. Businesses, such as Roger's Frigate, placed signs in support of Trump.

Polling of Americans on the impeachment and removal from office of Trump
Poll source	Date(s) conducted	Sample size	Margin of error	Support (Note: These polls are color-coded relative to the margin of error (×2 for spread). If the poll is within the doubled margin of error, both colors are used. If the margin of error is, for example, 2.5, then the spread would be 5, so a 50% support / 45% oppose would be tied.)	Oppose	Undecided
Yahoo! News / YouGov	December 4–6, 2019	1500	± 2.8%	47%	39%	14%
Monmouth University	December 4–8, 2019	903	± 3.3%	45%	50%	5%
Fox News	December 8–11, 2019	1000 RV	± 3%	50%	41%	5%
NPR / PBS NewsHour / Marist	December 9–11, 2019	1744	± 3.5%	46%	49%	5%
USA Today / Suffolk	December 10–14, 2019	1000 RV	± 3%	45.2%	50.5%	4.3%
Quinnipiac University	December 11–15, 2019	1390 RV	± 4.1%	45%	51%	4%
CNN / SSRS	December 12–15, 2019	888 RV	± 3.7%	45%	47%	9%
	December 18, 2019	Donald Trump is impeached by the House of Representatives				
Politico / Morning Consult	December 19–20, 2019	1387 RV	± 3.0%	51%	42%	6%
The Economist / YouGov	December 22–24, 2019	1500	± 2.9%	44%	41%	14%
CNN / SSRS	January 16–19, 2020	1156	± 3.4%	51%	45%	4%
NBC / The Wall Street Journal	January 26–29, 2020	1000 RV	± 3.1%	46%	49%	5%

== Aftermath ==
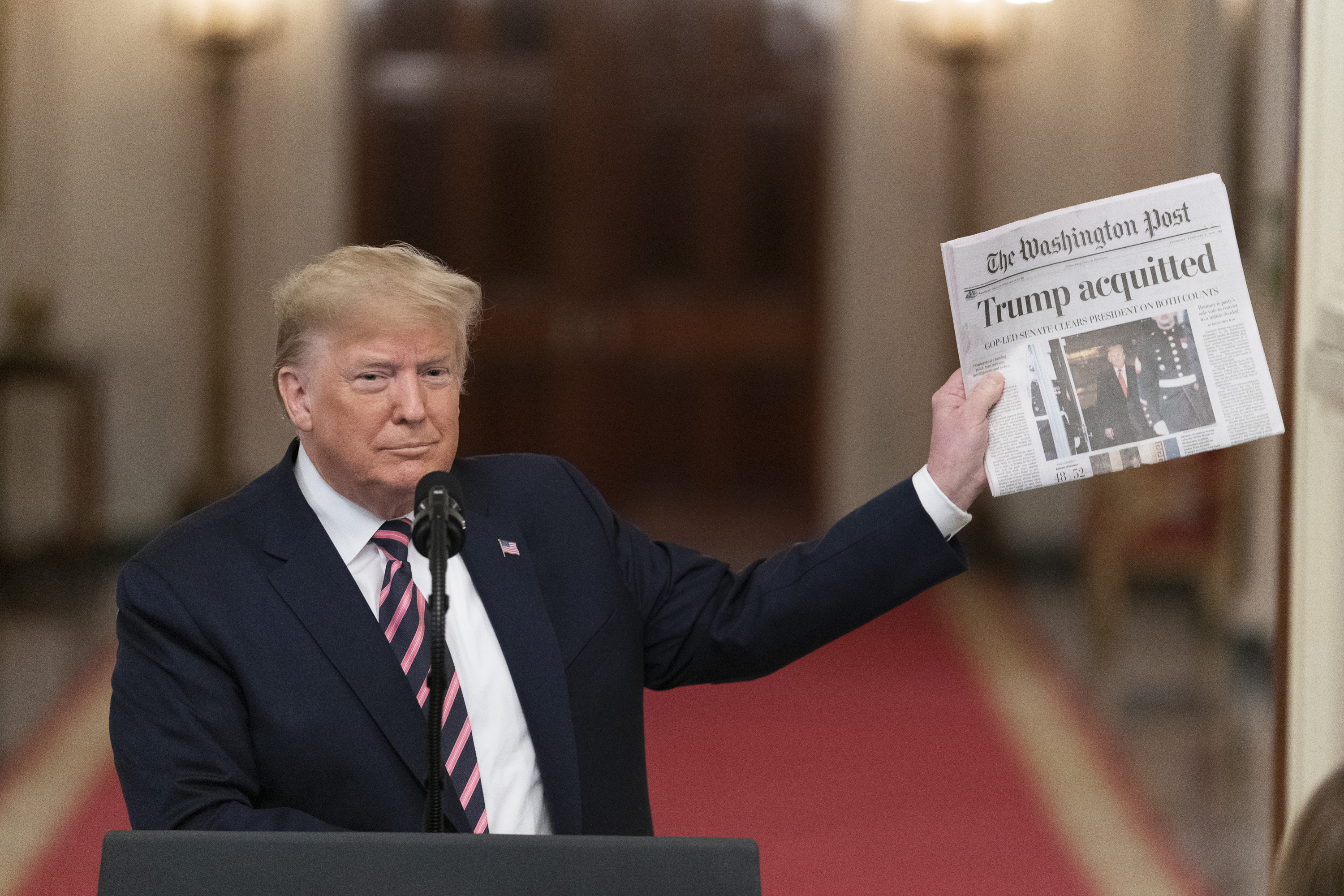
Donald Trump holds up a copy of The Washington Post reporting his acquittal during remarks on February 6, 2020, in the East Room of the White House.

Two days after the Senate acquitted him in the impeachment trial, Trump fired two witnesses who had testified in the impeachment inquiry about his conduct. On February 7, Gordon Sondland's ambassadorship was terminated, and Lieutenant Colonel Alexander Vindman was escorted from the White House after a dismissal from his job on the National Security Council. At the same time, Vindman's twin brother, Yevgeny, likewise an Army lieutenant colonel on the National Security Council, was also dismissed. Shortly before the firings, Trump said he was "not happy" with Alexander Vindman; after the firings, Trump said he "didn't know" Alexander Vindman but he was "very insubordinate". Alexander Vindman's lawyer responded that his client "was asked to leave for telling the truth. His honor, his commitment to right, frightened the powerful." Sondland reacted by stating that he was "grateful to President Trump for the opportunity to serve".

In January of 2020, John Bolton's memoir The Room Where It Happened confirmed the central basis for the impeachment, revealing that Trump did in fact withhold aid attempting to pressure Ukraine to announce investigations into the Bidens.

In April 2020, Trump fired Inspector General of the Intelligence Community Michael K. Atkinson. Trump further complained that Atkinson "never even came in to see me. How can you [forward the complaint] without seeing the person?"; he also concluded that Atkinson was "not a big Trump fan". Atkinson responded that he believed Trump had fired him for "having faithfully discharged my legal obligations as an independent and impartial inspector general, and from my commitment to continue to do so".

After 24 years in the House, Schiff would be elected to the Senate in November 2024.

Biden would be elected president of the United States in November 2020. The subsequent storming of the U.S. Capitol would lead to Trump's unprecedented second impeachment.

== See also ==
- List of federal political scandals in the United States
- Second impeachment of Donald Trump
- Proposed expungements of the impeachments of Donald Trump
