= The Room Where It Happened =

2020 memoir by John Bolton

The Room Where It Happened: A White House Memoir
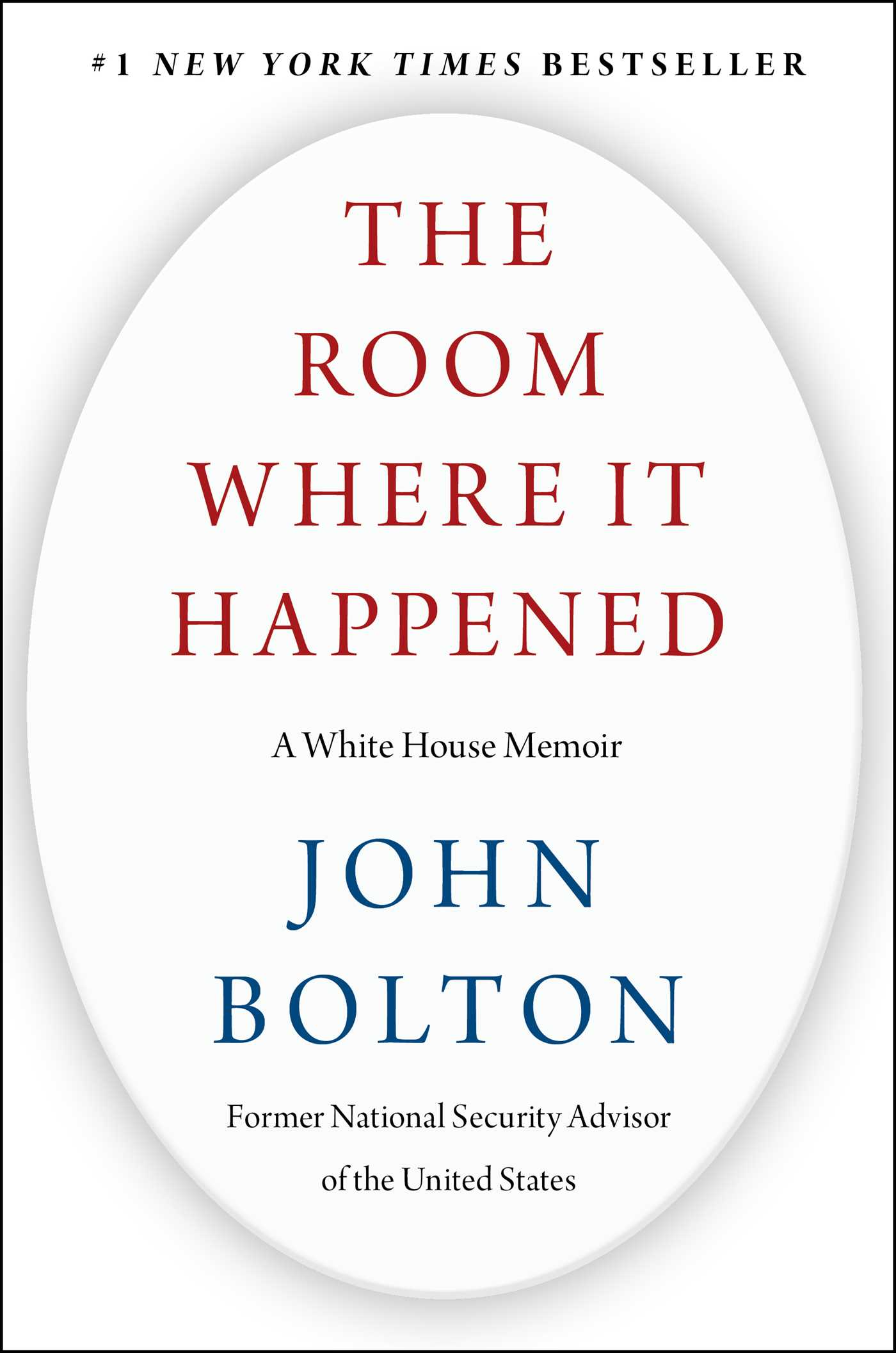
- Author: John Bolton
- Language: English
- Subject: Presidency of Donald Trump
- Genre: Essay; Memoir
- Publisher: Simon & Schuster
- Publication date: June 23, 2020
- Publication place: United States
- Media type: Print (hardback, paperback)
- Pages: 592
- ISBN: 9781982148034

The Room Where It Happened: A White House Memoir is a memoir by John Bolton, who served as National Security Advisor for U.S. president Donald Trump from April 2018 to September 2019. Bolton was reportedly paid an advance of $2 million by the publisher.

In late December 2019, one copy of the manuscript was provided to the White House for standard pre-publication review. In late January 2020, during the Senate impeachment trial, news of the book broke. Bolton's team was surprised that multiple copies of the manuscript had apparently been made and circulated. Leaked information about the book's contents increased the pressure for having Bolton testify in the Senate trial of Trump.

According to Bolton's original draft manuscript, William Barr and Bolton had a conversation about concerns Trump had appeared to have undue influence over two US Justice Department investigations of companies in China and Turkey; specifically regarding China's paramount leader Xi Jinping with regard to ZTE and President Recep Tayyip Erdoğan with regard to Halkbank. Bolton alleged that Trump, in an attempt to win re-election in agricultural states in the 2020 election, "[pleaded] with Xi to ensure he'd win. [Trump] stressed the importance of farmers, and increased Chinese purchases of soybeans and wheat in the electoral outcome". (Bolton also wrote that he wanted to directly quote Trump, but could not due to "the government's pre-publication review process".) He also stated that Trump asked if Finland was a part of Russia, and was unaware the United Kingdom is a nuclear power. Bolton alleged Trump intervened in U.S. law enforcement and practiced "obstruction of justice as a way of life."

On June 16, 2020, the Trump administration sought to block release of the book by Simon & Schuster, contending that Bolton had breached nondisclosure agreements he signed as a condition of his employment and that the book endangered national security. U.S. federal judge Royce Lamberth denied this request on June 20. On June 21, pirated copies of the book appeared online. The book was released on June 23. Later that summer, the Justice Department opened a criminal investigation into whether the book revealed classified information, empaneling a grand jury that subpoenaed the publisher's communications records.

The book is named after the song "The Room Where It Happens" from the 2015 stage musical Hamilton.

== Contents ==
In the book, Bolton claims that:

=== United States ===
- Trump has had a pattern of intervening against U.S. law enforcement and that White House Counsel Pat Cipollone "was plainly stunned at Trump's approach to law enforcement, or lack thereof."
- Bolton wrote, that Trump "had to be repeatedly talked out of withdrawing from NATO".

=== China ===
- Trump asked Chinese leader Xi Jinping to help him win re-election, offering to reduce U.S. tariffs in exchange "for some increases in Chinese farm-product purchases, to help with the crucial farm-state vote."
- Trump voiced approval for the Chinese government's building of the Xinjiang re-education camps for the Uyghur population.
- Trump refused to publicly criticize China's human rights violations and refused to issue a statement marking the 1989 Tiananmen Square massacre, saying "that was 15 years ago."
- Trump did not want to get involved with the 2019–20 Hong Kong protests saying "We have human-rights problems too".

=== Korea ===
- South Korean president Moon Jae-in's ideas and positions regarding North Korea were "schizophrenic."
- During Trump's 2018 Singapore summit with Kim Jong-un, secretary of State Mike Pompeo passed Bolton a note characterizing Trump as "so full of shit" and also characterized Trump's diplomacy with North Korea as having "zero probability of success." Without denying the specific allegations, Pompeo later denounced Bolton as a "traitor" and described the book as containing "a number of lies, fully-spun half-truths, and outright falsehoods."
- The 2018 North Korea–United States Singapore Summit was "South Korea's creation, related more to its 'unification' agenda than serious strategy on Kim's part or ours."

=== Europe ===
- Trump did not know whether or not Finland is a part of Russia.
- Bolton confirmed the central accusation of Trump's first impeachment that he withheld aid to Ukraine in an attempt to pressure the Ukrainian government into announcing an investigation into Democrats, Joe Biden and his son, Hunter.
- Trump was unaware that the United Kingdom is a nuclear power.

=== Middle East ===
- Trump told Turkish President Recep Tayyip Erdoğan that he (Trump) would "take care" of Geoffrey Berman's investigation against Turkey's state-owned bank Halkbank accused of bank fraud charges and laundering up to $20 billion on behalf of Iranian entities.
- Trump defended Saudi Arabian Crown Prince Mohammed bin Salman after the assassination of Jamal Khashoggi to distract from Ivanka Trump's email scandal.
- Trump gave Israeli Prime Minister Benjamin Netanyahu the green light to attack Iran. In 2019, Netanyahu, Bolton and Secretary of State Mike Pompeo successfully sabotaged Trump's attempts to open diplomatic channels with Iran.

=== Venezuela ===
- Bolton makes evident Washington's confused and vacillating policy towards the government of Venezuelan President Nicolás Maduro, criticizing Trump for acting so erratically in policies on Venezuela. Ultimately, Bolton suggests, Trump's strategy was only based on his personal agenda and reelection.
- Bolton tried to persuade Trump to endorse Juan Guaidó as soon as he was declared president, but the president had doubts about Guaidó, whom he considered a "child" in front of the "rude" Nicolás Maduro. Likewise, Trump doubted that Maduro fell, saying that he was 'too smart and too hard'. According to Bolton, Trump also suggested that Venezuela was part of the United States.
- Bolton claims in the book that Trump said it would be "legal" to invade Venezuela and that the South American country was "really part of the United States". Bolton alleges Trump said it'd be 'cool' to invade Venezuela.

== Publication and release ==
On March 3, 2020, Simon & Schuster pushed back the release date from March 17 to May 12, saying that the "new date reflects the fact that the government [pre-publication security] review of the work is ongoing". On April 29, the release date was pushed from May 12 to June 23 and the book length was increased from 528 to 576 pages. On June 17, 2020, The Washington Post and The New York Times published excerpts from the book after having obtained pre-publication copies, and The Wall Street Journal published an "exclusive excerpt" from the book with a byline by John Bolton. On June 21, a pirated copy of the book appeared online. On June 23, the book was released as scheduled. In its first week, the book sold 780,000 copies.

=== Trump administration responses ===
As Trump faced an impeachment trial that raised the possibility Bolton might provide testimony, the White House on January 23 issued a formal threat to stop Bolton from publishing his book, citing national security concerns. Bolton had submitted his manuscript to the National Security Council for security review in December 2019, and after months of discussions, was told on April 27 by Ellen Knight—the NSC's senior director for prepublication review—that no other classification issues remained. However, the White House did not provide Bolton written notice that he could proceed with publication, and in May another NSC official, Michael Ellis, was assigned to further review the manuscript. Knight is a career NSC staffer, while Ellis was acting at the direction of Trump political appointees under national security advisor Robert O'Brien. The Trump administration asserted that Bolton did not inform it of his decision to proceed with publication, while Bolton asserts he was not advised of the second review by Ellis.

On June 16, 2020—after the book had been shipped to distribution warehouses awaiting official release the following week—the Trump administration filed a civil lawsuit against Bolton in the United States District Court for the District of Columbia, alleging breach of contract for failing to submit his manuscript for prepublication security review, seeking to confiscate his $2 million advance, asserting the manuscript was "rife with classified information." The next day, the Department of Justice filed an emergency application for a temporary restraining order and preliminary injunction against Bolton, "seeking to enjoin publication of a book containing classified information." By that day, media outlets had acquired copies of the book and had begun publishing articles on its contents.

Several groups, including the American Civil Liberties Union, the Knight First Amendment Institute at Columbia University, PEN American Center, the Reporters Committee for Freedom of the Press, the Association of American Publishers, Dow Jones & Company, The New York Times Company, and The Washington Post filed amicus briefs opposing the motion for a temporary restraining order. Simon & Schuster released a statement calling the lawsuit "nothing more than the latest in a long running series of efforts by the Administration to quash publication of a book it deems unflattering to the President" and an attempt to infringe Bolton's "First Amendment right to tell the story of his time in the White House to the American public".

Bolton's attorney, Chuck Cooper, asserted that the White House was slow-walking the review process to prevent the book, which contained extensive harsh criticism of Trump, from being released during the 2020 election campaign. Cooper had written to Knight when he submitted the manuscript in December, to recount a phone conversation they'd had, stating, "it is our understanding that the process of reviewing submitted materials is restricted to those career government officials and employees regularly charged with responsibility for such reviews. Accordingly, we understand that the contents of Ambassador Bolton's manuscript will not be reviewed or otherwise disclosed to any persons not regularly involved in that process." His letter also noted that, per Bolton's 2018 agreement with the government, there was a 30 working-day limit for the prepublication review. Trump asserted the book contained "highly classified" information but also characterized the book as "pure fiction."

In its June 17 brief filed with the court, the Justice Department provided six examples of what it asserted were classified items that remained in the book, including some characterized as "exceptionally restricted," meaning they could jeopardize intelligence sources and methods. Trump had previously asserted that every conversation with him is "highly classified," and Bolton stated in his book that the prepublication review prohibited him from quoting the president's exact words but not from characterizing what Trump said. For example, Bolton characterized Trump as "pleading with Xi to ensure he'd win" the 2020 election, while Vanity Fair—citing the original manuscript it had seen—showed Bolton quoted Trump telling Xi, "Make sure I win" and "I will probably win anyway, so don't hurt my farms.… Buy a lot of soybeans and wheat and make sure we win."

During a hearing on June 19, Justice Lamberth castigated Bolton for proceeding to publish his book without formal clearance, but expressed doubt he could block publication. A Justice Department attorney acknowledged that Ellis had received no training in reviewing classified information until that month, and that as many as half of the items Ellis had marked as classified may not have been so when Bolton wrote his manuscript, and Ellis' review was the first time they were flagged. Both Lamberth and Cooper noted that while the Justice Department provided an affidavit from Ellis in its brief, it did not include any statement from Knight. After the hearing, which was held via video conference due to the COVID-19 pandemic, Lamberth reviewed the Justice Department evidence in a closed-door session.

On June 20, Judge Lamberth ruled that "Bolton likely published classified materials" and "has exposed his country to harm and himself to civil (and potentially criminal) liability," but denied the government's motion for a temporary restraining order, as "the government has failed to establish that an injunction will prevent irreparable harm." Lamberth elaborated: "While Bolton's unilateral conduct raises grave national security concerns, the government has not established that an injunction is an appropriate remedy. For reasons that hardly need to be stated, the Court will not order nationwide seizure and destruction of a political memoir." Cooper welcomed the "decision by the Court denying the Government's attempt to suppress Ambassador Bolton's book" but disagreed "with the Court's preliminary conclusion at this early stage of the case that Ambassador Bolton did not comply fully with his contractual prepublication obligation to the Government." Cooper had argued before Lamberth the previous day that the particular version of the agreement Bolton had signed did not require that he receive written clearance to proceed to publication.

In September 2020, Knight asserted that her decisions about what in the book should be deemed classified were overridden by White House officials, notably legal advisors close to the president. She claimed she was forced out of the NSC after she declined to sign a statement that would support a government lawsuit against Bolton for publishing his book without White House authorization.

Lamberth ruled on October 1 that the government suit could proceed, rejecting the defense argument that a close parsing of Bolton's nondisclosure agreements showed they required he be aware he was publishing classified information to be charged and that Knight's verbal assurances established that he was not aware.

The Justice Department dropped its criminal inquiry of Bolton in June 2021 and moved to end efforts to confiscate proceeds from his book.

== Reactions ==
On June 22, South Korea took issue with Bolton's account of events surrounding the 2019 North Korea–United States Hanoi Summit, with South Korean national security adviser Chung Eui-yong saying that "[u]nilaterally publishing consultations made based on mutual trust violates the basic principles of diplomacy and could severely damage future negotiations."

On June 18, 2020, during an ABC News interview, Bolton gave his rebuttal to Trump's previous tweets in which Trump called him a "wacko" and a "sick puppy" and that Bolton's book is "a compilation of lies and made up stories" by saying that "[t]he president isn't worried about foreign governments reading this book. He's worried about the American people reading this book."

Turkey criticized Bolton's book, saying it included misleading accounts of conversations between Trump and Turkish President Erdoğan.

Secretary of State Mike Pompeo accused Bolton of being a "traitor". Pompeo claimed that "from the excerpts I've seen published, John Bolton is spreading a number of lies, fully-spun half-truths and outright falsehoods … I was in the room too."

Bolton used the title of one of the musical Hamilton's songs, "The Room Where It Happens", as the title of his book. Lin-Manuel Miranda, the creator of the musical, reacted by posting the rewritten lyrics of another Hamilton song on Twitter: "Let me tell you what I wish I'd known/When I was young and dreamed of glory/You have no control/Who lives, who dies, who [borrows your song title to write a cash-in book when they could have testified before Congress] tells your story...".

== Reviews ==
German author Klaus Brinkbäumer, a New York-based contributor to the weekly newspaper Die Zeit, criticized the book as "cowardly [and] stupid... So submissive and vain; and apolitical, so amazingly unhistorical and unintelligent." Brinkbäumer goes on to say that the book only exists due to the $2 million advance payment Bolton received.

The New York Times book review by Jennifer Szalai called the book "exceedingly tedious and slightly unhinged", 500 pages of "minute and often extraneous details" and "bloated with self-importance".

The Guardian book review by Peter Conrad said it was a "punchy but self-aggrandising memoir" and that, "[d]espite the promise of the book's title, Bolton was not in the room during Trump's extended confab with Putin in Helsinki, from which Putin emerged as cockily as a strutting bantam while Trump stumbled out like a trodden hen with ruffled feathers."

== See also ==
- First impeachment of Donald Trump
- Fear: Trump in the White House
- Fire and Fury
