= Joyce Beatty =

American politician (born 1950)

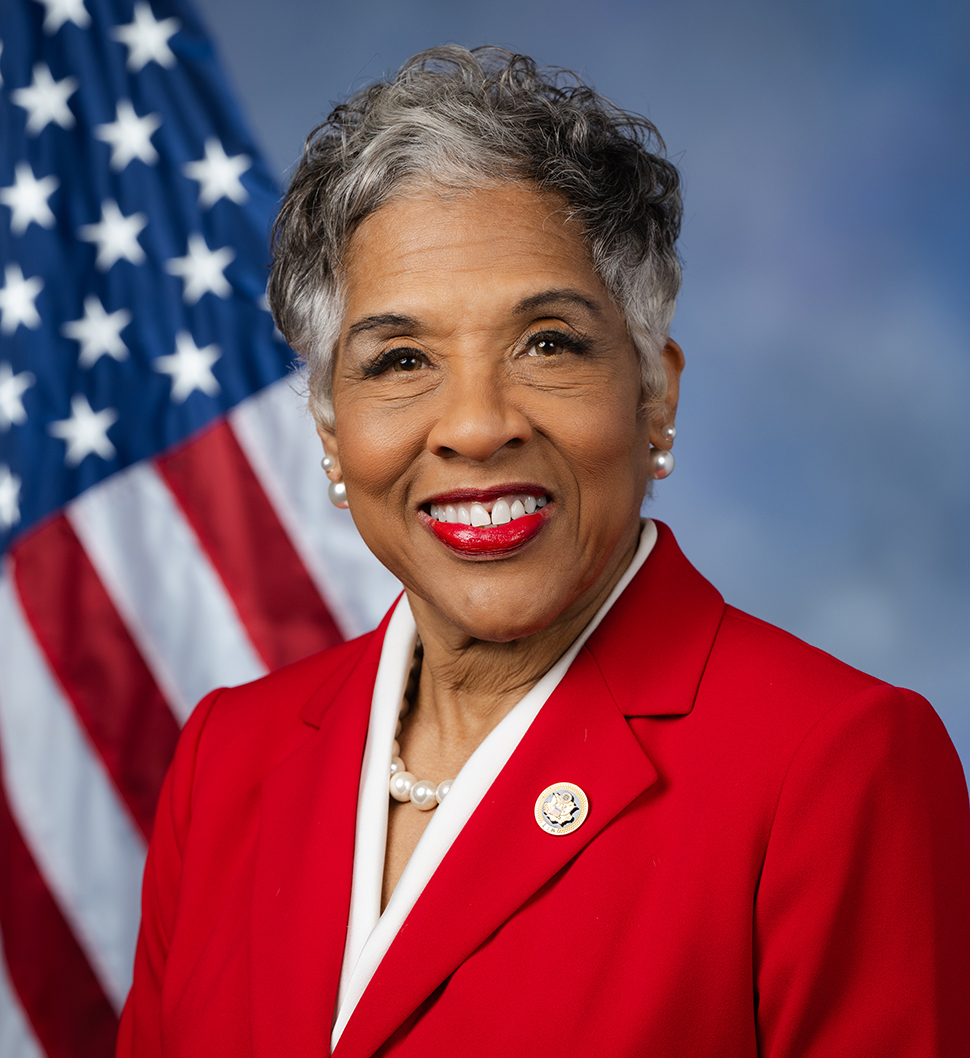
- Official portrait, 2025

Chair of the Congressional Black Caucus
- In office January 3, 2021 – January 3, 2023
- Preceded by: Karen Bass
- Succeeded by: Steven Horsford

Member of the U.S. House of Representatives from Ohio's 3rd district
- Incumbent
- Assumed office January 3, 2013
- Preceded by: Mike Turner (redistricted)

Minority Leader of the Ohio House of Representatives
- In office January 15, 2006 – January 5, 2009
- Preceded by: Chris Redfern
- Succeeded by: William G. Batchelder

Member of the Ohio House of Representatives
- In office May 31, 1999 – December 31, 2008
- Preceded by: Otto Beatty Jr.
- Succeeded by: W. Carlton Weddington
- Constituency: 21st district (1999‍–‍2003); 27th district (2003‍–‍2008)

Personal details
- Born: Joyce Marie Birdsong; March 12, 1950 (age 76) Dayton, Ohio, U.S.
- Party: Democratic
- Spouses: John Hannah (m. 1970; div. 1990); Otto Beatty Jr. (m. 1992; died 2021)
- Children: 2
- Education: Central State University (BA); Wright State University (MS); University of Cincinnati (attended)
- Website: House website Campaign website
- Beatty's voice Beatty on Black History Month. Recorded February 1, 2023

Joyce Marie Beatty (/ˈbeɪti/ BAY-tee, née Birdsong, March 12, 1950), is an American politician serving as U.S. representative for Ohio's 3rd congressional district since 2013 and as chair of the Congressional Black Caucus from 2021 to 2023. A member of the Democratic Party, Beatty represented the 27th district in the Ohio House of Representatives from 1999 to 2008, serving for a time as minority leader. She was also previously senior vice president of outreach and engagement at Ohio State University.

In 2012, Beatty ran in the newly redrawn Ohio's 3rd congressional district, based in Columbus, and won the Democratic primary, defeating former U.S. representative Mary Jo Kilroy. She went on to defeat Republican Chris Long in the general election. Beatty was married to Otto Beatty Jr., who was a former Ohio state representative.

== Early life, education, and early political career ==
Beatty was born on March 12, 1950, in Dayton, Ohio. She has a Bachelor of Arts in speech from Central State University and a 1975 Master of Science in counseling psychology from Wright State University, and has studied at the University of Cincinnati. Beatty served as Montgomery County health and human services director by administering the county's health levy and area public nursing homes, including Stillwater Nursing Home. In 2003, she received an honorary doctorate from Ohio Dominican University. Beatty served as a delegate for John Kerry on the Ohio delegation to the 2004 Democratic National Convention in Boston.

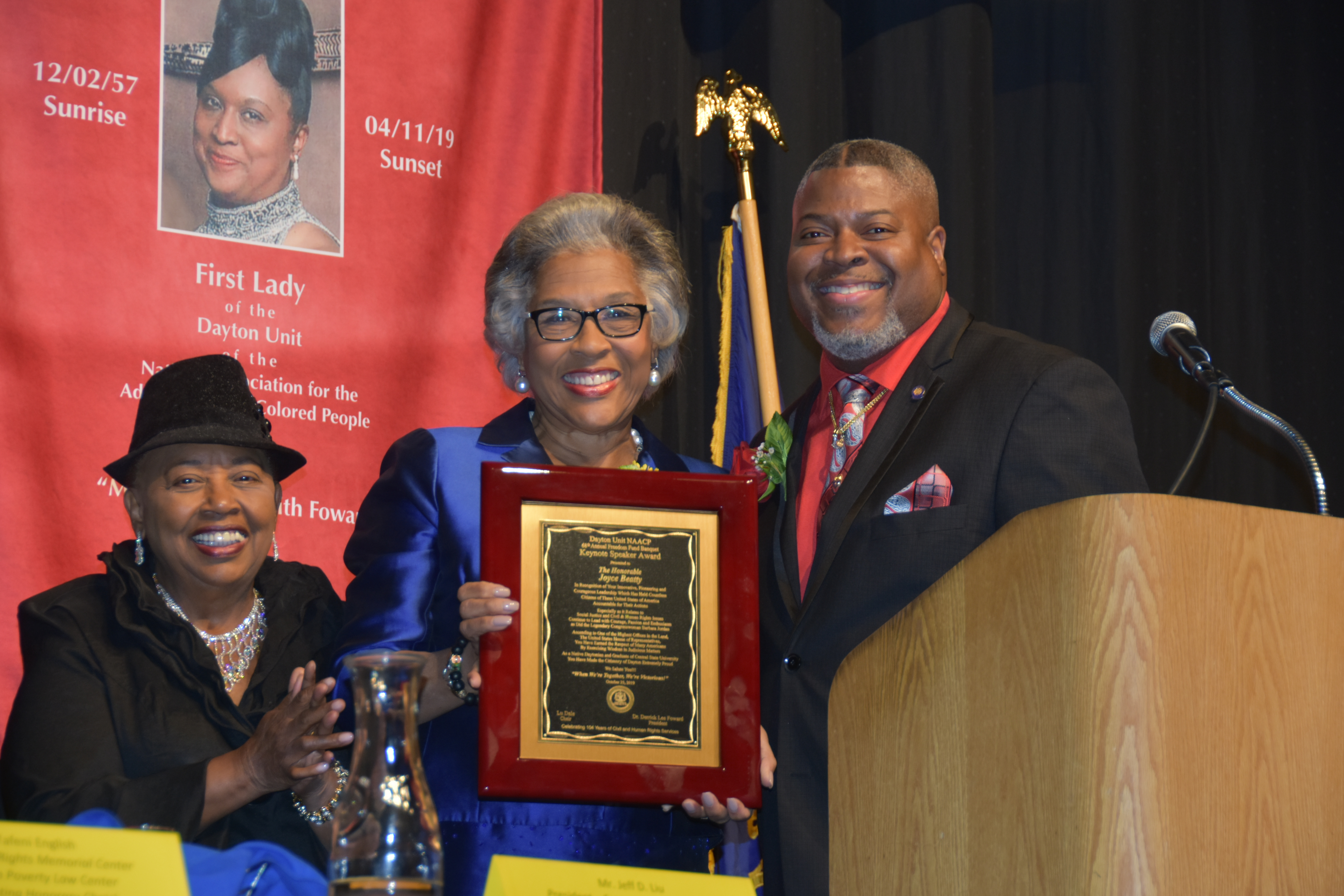
Beatty receiving the Dayton NAACP Leadership Award, 2019

Beatty was married to attorney and former state representative Otto Beatty Jr. She has been a national spokesperson for the American Heart Association. She served on the Columbus American Heart Association Board, Ohio Democratic Committee, Women's Fund, NAACP, and Delta Sigma Theta sorority. In addition, she was a legislative chair of The Links and chair of the Columbus Urban League Board. She won the 2002 YWCA Woman of Achievement Award, Ohio Health Speaking of Women Health Award, NAACP Freedom Award, Woman of Courage Award, Urban League Leadership Recognition Award, and Dayton NAACP 2019 Leadership Award.

== Ohio House of Representatives ==
=== Elections ===
In 1999, longtime state representative Otto Beatty Jr. of Ohio's 21st House district decided to resign early to begin an opportunity in the private sector. His wife, Joyce Beatty, was appointed to his seat. She won a full term in 2000 with 82% of the vote. After redistricting, she decided to run in the newly redrawn Ohio's 27th House district and was reelected in 2002, with 82% of the vote. In 2004, she was reelected to a third term unopposed. In 2006, she was reelected to a fourth term, with 87% of the vote. Term limits kept Beatty from seeking another term in 2008.

=== Tenure ===
After Chris Redfern left to become chair of the Ohio Democratic Party, Beatty was named minority leader. She served in that capacity during the Ohio 127th General Assembly. She was the first female Democratic House leader in Ohio history.

== U.S. House of Representatives ==
=== Elections ===
==== 2012 ====
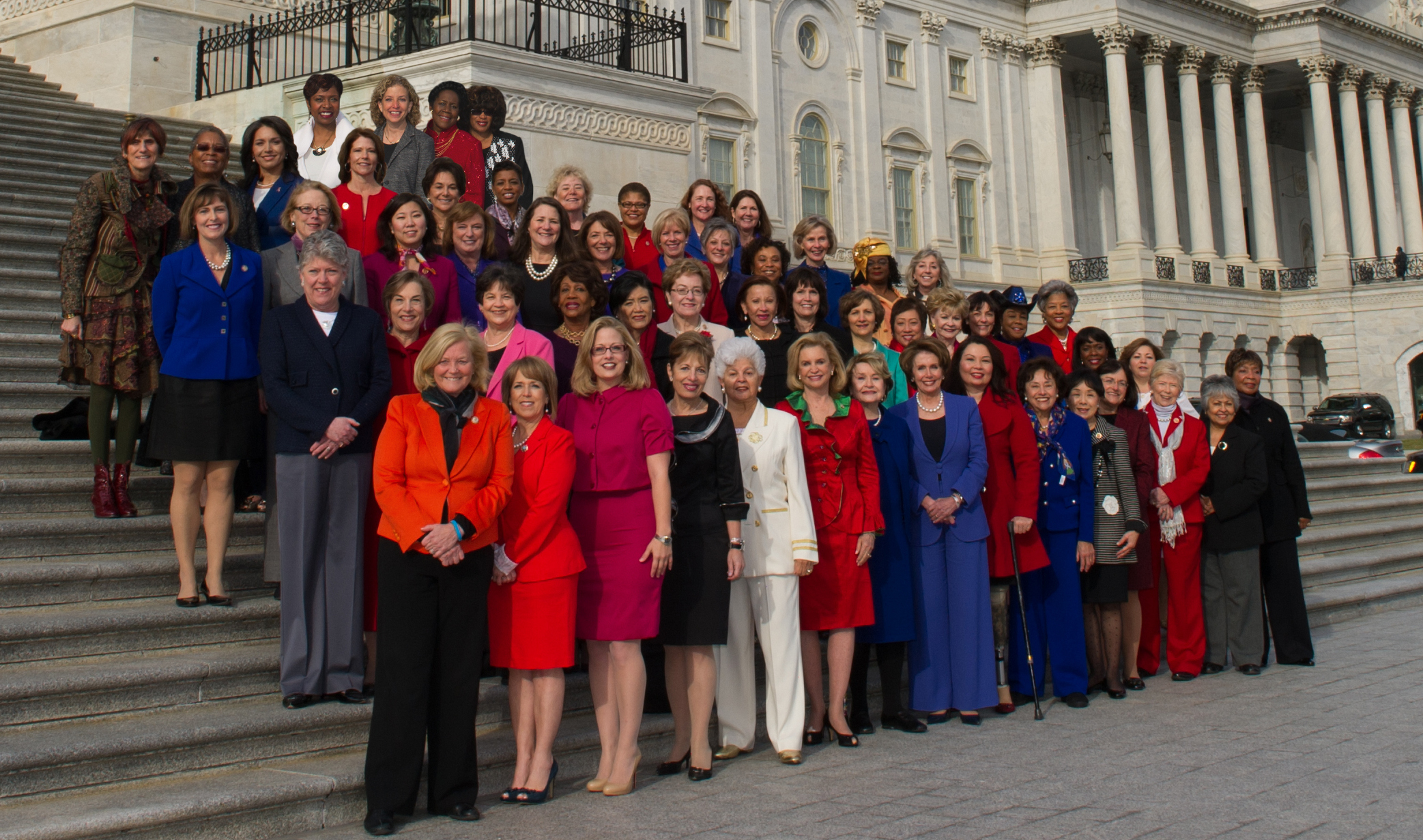
Beatty with the House of Representatives Democratic Women of the 113th Congress

On March 6, 2012, Beatty defeated former congresswoman Mary Jo Kilroy, Columbus city councilwoman Priscilla Tyson, and state representative Ted Celeste 38%–35%-15%-12% to win the Ohio 3rd congressional district Democratic primary. She received early support from the Ohio Legislative Black Caucus, Columbus Mayor Michael B. Coleman, and various other Central Ohio political figures, including Representative Tracy Maxwell Heard and former representative W. Carlton Weddington. In the general election, she defeated Republican Chris Long, 68.3%–26.3%.

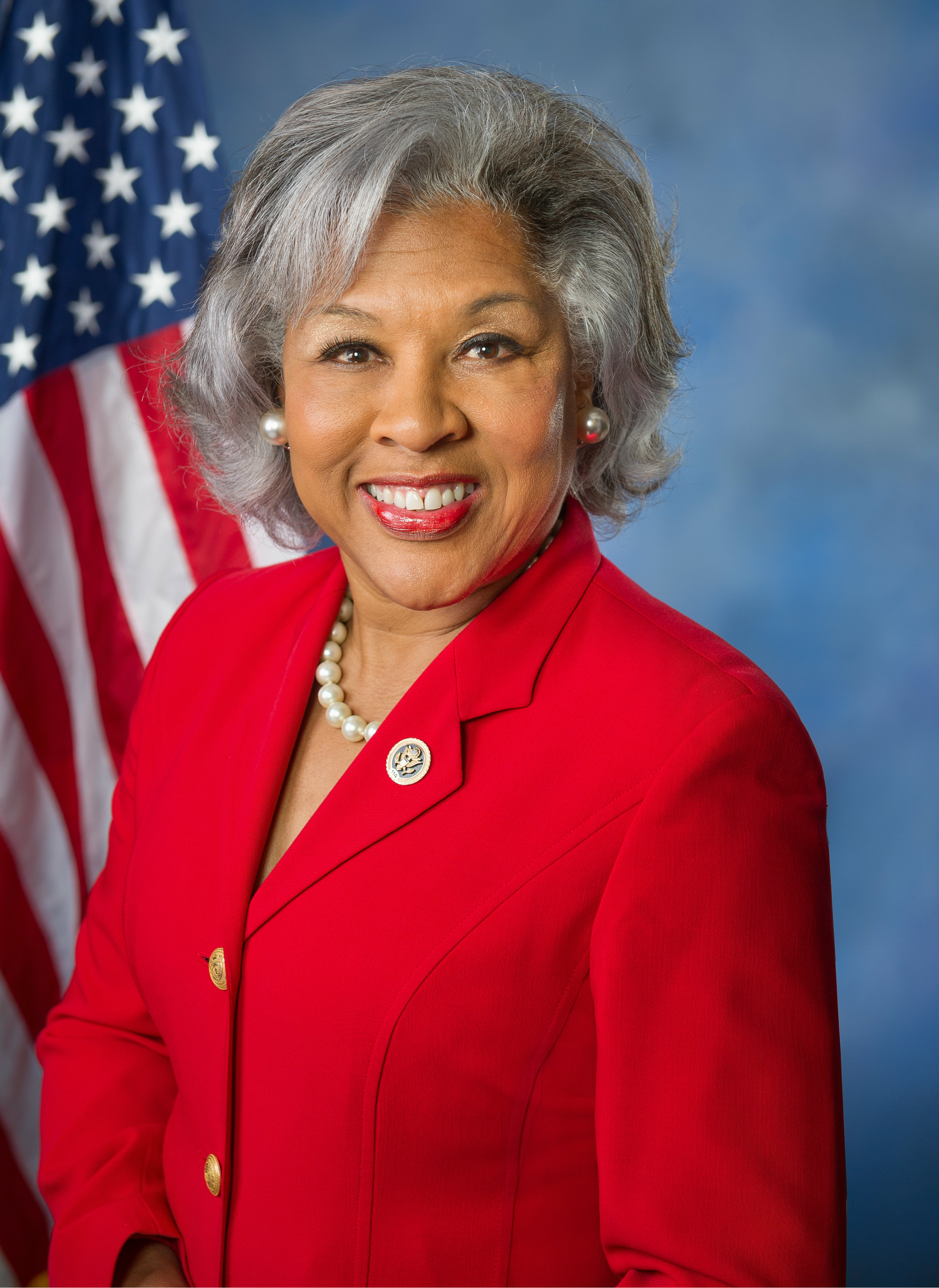
Beatty in 2013

==== 2020 ====
Ohio 3rd district, based in Columbus, election results, 2020

Starting in late 2019 and into early 2020, Beatty was campaigning for her fifth term as representative of Ohio's 3rd congressional district. She faced her first primary challenge since she was elected in 2012, with The Columbus Dispatch writing that the "winner of the Democratic primary almost certainly will go to Washington representing the heavily Democratic district." At the end of 2019, it was reported she had $1.7 million in her campaign account. In February 2020, she was criticized for accepting campaign contributions from financial services PACs while also overseeing the House Financial Services Committee. According to OpenSecrets, at the time, Beatty had raised $5.1 million as a candidate for the U.S. and Ohio Houses, of which $1.5 million was from the finance, insurance, and real estate industries. In her defense, she argued that she had a "record of grilling bank executives who come before her committee and that much of the money from those PACs came from lower-level employees" and that although Congress needed campaign finance reform, the PAC contributions were "legal under current rules".

In March 2020, The Intercept reported that Beatty and her husband sold one of their Columbus properties in 2013 "to a developer while Otto Beatty sat on the zoning board that approved the sale", leading to accusations of gentrification and "money in politics" by Beatty's political opposition. Beatty called the criticism a "distortion" of her husband's record. Otto Beatty, in an interview with The Dispatch, said his wife had nothing to do with the property's pricing: it had been sold when he was on the Downtown Commission, which "reviewed a request to demolish the existing structures on the property and replace them with a high-rise apartment building". Arguing at the time in favor of demolition and redevelopment, Otto Beatty noted he did not take part in the final vote.

On April 28, 2020, Beatty won the Democratic primary, defeating challenger Morgan Harper, a self-described progressive. Harper, who had been backed by the Sunrise Movement, a group that backed Representative Alexandria Ocasio-Cortez, lost with 32% of the vote to Beatty's 68%. Beatty defeated Republican nominee Mark Richardson with 71% of the vote.

=== Tenure ===
Beatty discussing why she voted in support of the articles of impeachment in the first impeachment of Donald Trump

From 2013 to 2020, five of the 88 bills Beatty sponsored became law, all of them wrapped into broader bills. In 2020, she noted she had "helped to secure" local funding for the revitalization of parts of Dayton and research at Ohio State.

On June 21, 2013, the National Journal published an article titled "Nearly One in Five Members of Congress Gets Paid Twice", which reported that Beatty's state pension of $253,323 is the highest and, combined with her congressional salary, was greater than President Obama's total government compensation.

Beatty supported both the first and second impeachments of Donald Trump.

On July 15, 2021, Beatty was one of nine protesters the United States Capitol Police arrested for illegally demonstrating in the Hart Senate Office Building. She and approximately 20 other voting rights protesters sought to push the Senate to support the For the People Act and the John Lewis Voting Rights Act. After multiple warnings from the police, Beatty was arrested for violating a Washington, D.C., law against "crowding, obstructing, or incommoding".

On June 12, 2025, Beatty was one of the four Democrats who did not vote on the $9-billion spending cuts put forward by the Department of Government Efficiency; house Republicans passed the rescission package by 2 votes.

=== Committee assignments ===
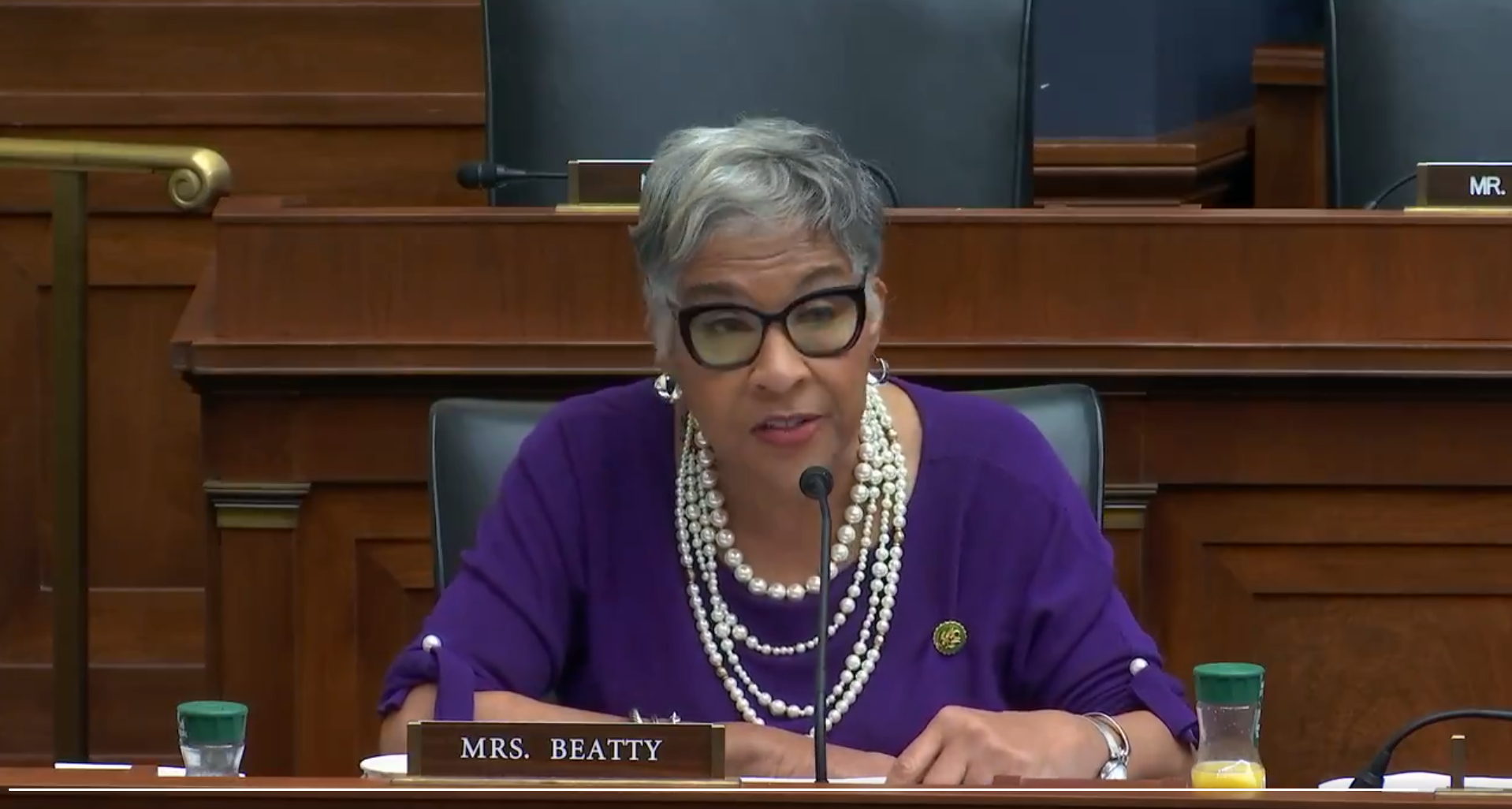
Beatty speaking in support of an amendment while on the House Financial Services Committee

- Committee on Financial Services (113th Congress – present)
  - Subcommittee on Diversity and Inclusion, chair
  - Subcommittee on Housing, Community Development and Insurance
  - Subcommittee on Oversight and Investigations
- Joint Economic Committee (116th Congress – present)

=== Caucus memberships ===
- Black Maternal Health Caucus
- Congressional Black Caucus
- Congressional Equality Caucus
- Medicare for All Caucus
- Congressional Coalition on Adoption
- Rare Disease Caucus

== Political positions ==
=== Abortion ===
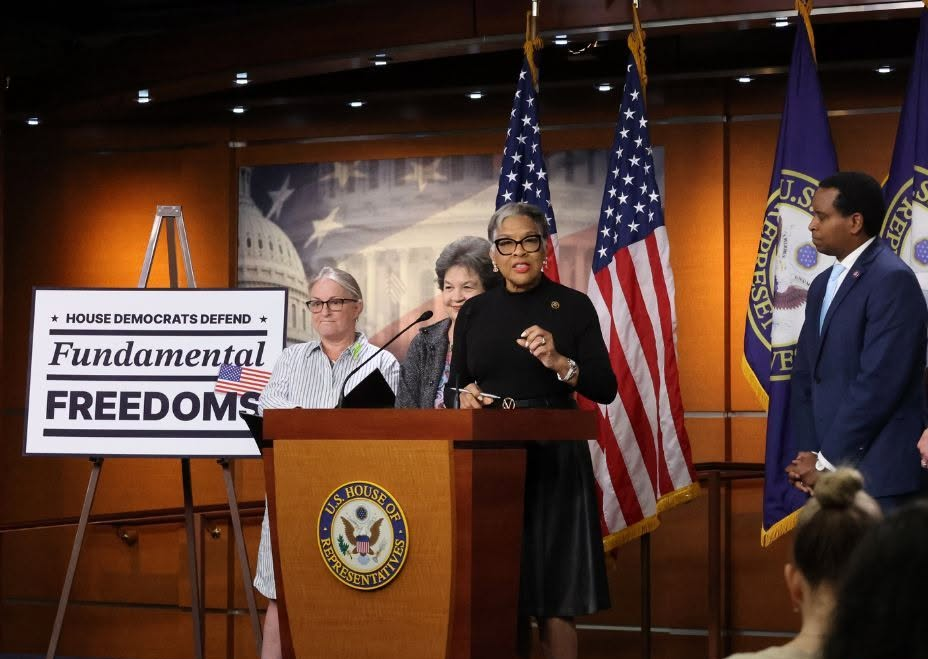
Beatty speaking in support of reproductive healthcare, 2024

Beatty is pro-choice.

=== Cannabis ===
At one point, Beatty opposed legalizing cannabis for recreational use, but in December 2020, she voted for the Marijuana Opportunity Reinvestment and Expungement Act (HR 3617), which would remove cannabis from the federal Controlled Substances Act, provide a pathway for expungements and resentencing for marijuana convictions, and create a community reinvestment fund to help create an equitable cannabis industry.

=== Immigration ===
Beatty voted for a defense bill that included $1.3 billion for fencing at the United States–Mexico border.

=== Economy ===
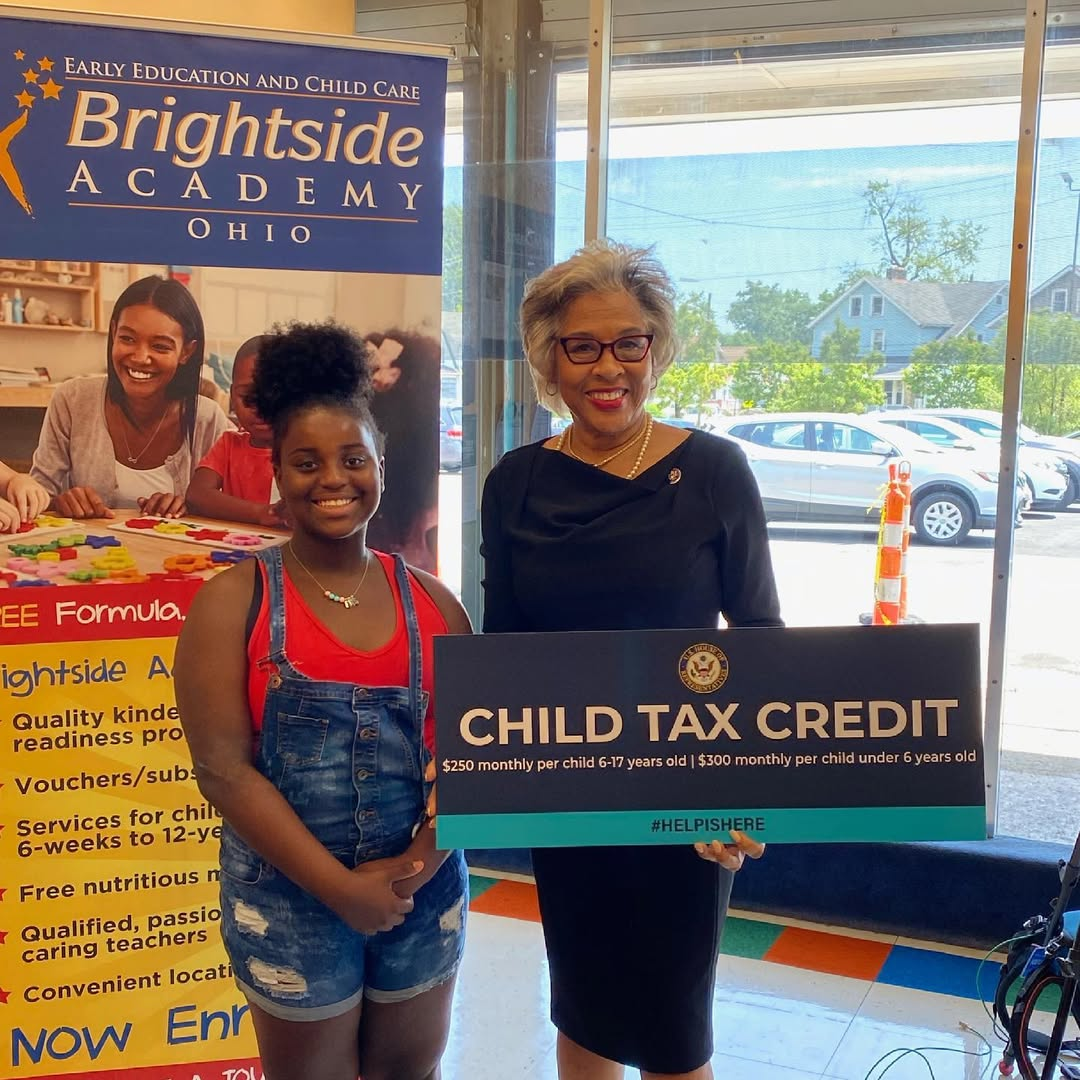
Beatty showing support for the Child Tax Credit, 2021

Beatty opposes decreasing corporate taxes.

=== Environment ===
Beatty supports "parts of" the Green New Deal.

=== Foreign affairs ===
Beatty voted to provide Israel with support after the October 7 attacks.

=== Health care ===
Beatty supported the Affordable Care Act (also known as Obamacare) and opposed its repeal. In 2019, she introduced the End Price Gouging for Insulin Act bill, which would lower insulin prices nationwide. Beatty's father was diabetic, as was her husband. She has supported efforts in Ohio by Hearcel Craig and Beth Liston to regulate insulin prices. In 2019, she supported "some of" the "health-care fixes that focus on smaller changes to the Affordable Care Act rather than a complete overhaul of the system." In March 2020, she voted with a majority of U.S. representatives for a $8.3-billion bill to combat COVID-19.

=== Kennedy Center renaming ===
Beatty was appointed as an ex officio Congressional member of the board of directors of the Kennedy Center by then-Speaker Nancy Pelosi in 2019.

During a vote on the proposal to rename the Kennedy Center and include President Donald Trump's name on the building, Beatty stated that she was repeatedly muted during a group call of the Kennedy Center board and not allowed to register her opposition. Beatty sued Trump and members of the board over the name change, calling the vote a "thinly veiled sham", and said the name change violated federal law. On May 29, 2026, US District Judge Christopher R. Cooper ruled in favor of her lawsuit, requiring Trump's name to be removed from the building, and stopping the Center's announced two-year closure.

== Federal electoral history ==
Ohio's 3rd congressional district (2012)
Party	Candidate	Votes	%
Democratic	Joyce Beatty	201,897	68.3
Republican	Chris Long	77,901	26.3
Libertarian	Richard Ehrbar	9,462	3.2
Green	Bob Fitrakis	6,387	2.2
Independent	Jeff Brown (write-in)	5	0.0
Total votes		295,652	100.0
Democratic gain from Republican			

Ohio's 3rd congressional district (2014)
Party	Candidate	Votes	%
Democratic	Joyce Beatty (incumbent)	91,769	64.1
Republican	John Adams	51,475	35.9
Independent	Ralph A. Applegate (write-in)	17	0.0
Total votes		143,261	100.0
Democratic hold			

Ohio's 3rd congressional district (2016)
Party	Candidate	Votes	%
Democratic	Joyce Beatty (incumbent)	199,791	68.6
Republican	John Adams	91,560	31.4
Total votes		291,351	100.0
Democratic hold			

Ohio's 3rd congressional district (2018)
Party	Candidate	Votes	%
Democratic	Joyce Beatty (incumbent)	181,575	73.6
Republican	Jim Burgess	65,040	26.4
Independent	Millie Milam (write-in)	62	0.0
Total votes		246,677	100.0
Democratic hold			

Ohio's 3rd congressional district (2020)
Party	Candidate	Votes	%
Democratic	Joyce Beatty (incumbent)	227,420	70.8
Republican	Mark Richardson	93,569	29.2
Write-in		103	0.0
Total votes		321,092	100.0
Democratic hold			

Ohio's 3rd congressional district (2022)
Party	Candidate	Votes	%
Democratic	Joyce Beatty (incumbent)	182,324	70.5
Republican	Lee Stahley	76,455	29.5
Write-in		18	0.0
Total votes		258,797	100.0
Democratic hold			

Ohio's 3rd congressional district (2024)
Party	Candidate	Votes	%
Democratic	Joyce Beatty (incumbent)	242,632	70.7
Republican	Michael Young	100,355	29.3
Total votes		342,987	100.0
Democratic hold			

== See also ==
- List of African-American United States representatives
- Women in the United States House of Representatives

Ohio House of Representatives
Preceded by Chris Redfern	Minority Leader of the Ohio House of Representatives; 2006–2009	Succeeded by William G. Batchelder
U.S. House of Representatives
Preceded by Mike Turner	Member of the U.S. House of Representatives from Ohio's 3rd congressional district 2013–present	Incumbent
Preceded by Karen Bass	Chair of the Congressional Black Caucus; 2021–2023	Succeeded by Steven Horsford
U.S. order of precedence (ceremonial)
Preceded by Andy Barr	United States representatives by seniority 99th	Succeeded by Ami Bera
