= Roger's Frigate =

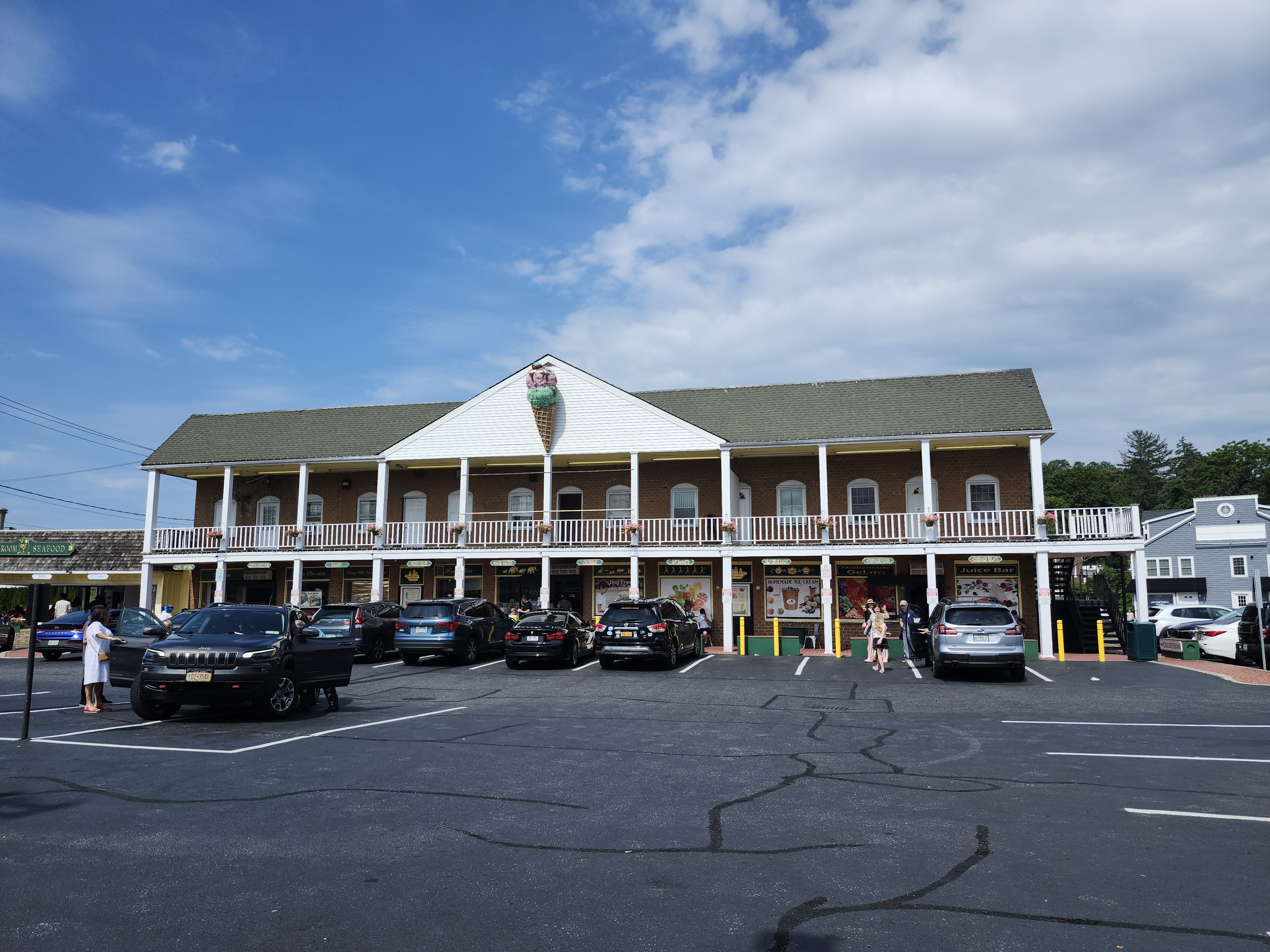
- Roger's Frigate in 2026
- Interactive map of Roger's Frigate

Restaurant information
- Location: 99 Main St A, Port Jefferson, New York, United States
- Coordinates: 40.9469°N 73.0689°W

The Roger's Frigate, also known as the Port Jefferson Frigate, is a candy shop owned by George Wallis that is in Port Jefferson, New York.

== History ==
At one point in the 1990s, George Wallis bought the Roger's Frigate.

In 2002, Wallis replaced a statue of Thomas Jefferson with a statue of an eagle meant to honor victims of the 9/11 attacks. Jeanne Garant, Felix J. Grucci Jr., Robert J. Gaffney, and Charles Lefkowitz were at the statue's unveiling.

In 2017, the Roger' Frigate was the subject of criticism for hanging a banner that said, "In Trump We Trust". Around two dozen people called to complain. The shop previously hung a banner that just said "Trump", which they were issued a summons for. The shop received a second summons due to the "In Trump We Trust" sign, in which section 250-31D(2)(iv) of the village code was cited. Roger Rutherford, the store's general manager at the time responded by stating that the business's “free speech rights have been targeted.”

In 2020, Roger's Frigate rehung the "In Trump We Trust" sign in support of Trump during his impeachment trial. Rutherford argued that the town was using a double standard when enforcing the regulation, with the store being targeted for its political beliefs. While Margot Garant, Port Jefferson's mayor, argued the reason is apolitical and just about having a uniform look. Rutherford also said that the sign was beneficial to their business, saying, "People are coming by taking pictures, love the sign and all in support of our president." Roger's Frigate eventually conceded and removed the sign, but put it back up 4 years later.

Later in that same year, Roger's Frigate put up a sign that said "Impeach Cuomo", referring to then New York Governor Andrew Cuomo. The shop was protesting Cuomo's orders to shut down businesses. Officials of the city responded by saying the sign was illegal. In response to the officials, Rutherford said Roger's Frigate wasn't going to get a permit because the city objected his political views. Judge Tara Higgins later ruled that Roger Frigate's right to freedom of speech outweighed the village sign ordinance.
