= Priscilla Tyson =

Former Columbus Councilwoman

- Education: Franklin University
- Occupation: Councillor (2007–2022), politician
- Employer: City Year (1997–2010); Columbus City Council (2007–2021); Lazarus; National City Corp. (1977–1993); OhioHealth (1993–1997)
- Political party: Democratic Party
- Position held: councillor (2007–2021), board member

Priscilla R. Tyson (born April 4, 1955) is a former Columbus Councilwoman and is the longest-serving female councilmember in the Columbus City Council's history. She is the founding director for City Year Columbus. She also spearheaded the passage of Columbus' CROWN Act to end hair discrimination.

== Personal life ==
Tyson was born on April 4, 1955. Tyson grew up on the East Side of Columbus on St. Claire Avenue. Her father had died when she was 6 months old. She has 4 siblings, 3 sisters and 1 brother. She was raised by her mother and step-father. In 1994, her name was Priscilla H. Butler. She married attorney Renny Tyson in 1999. She has 5 children.

== Education ==
She attended Garfield Elementary School, which has now been transformed into the King Arts Complex. She attended Eastmoor Middle School and then graduated from Eastmoor High School in 1973. She graduated from Franklin University with a Bachelor of Science degree in Business Administration. She was the first of her family to earn a college degree.

== Career ==
During high school, Tyson worked for a paint company. She went on to work for Lazarus department store during her college years. From 1977 to 1993, Tyson was the vice president of National City Bank, now owned by PNC. From 1993 to1997, she was the vice president of community relations at Ohio Health Systems. She was the first Black vice president in the company. From 1994, Mayor Greg Lashutka asked Tyson to serve on the Columbus Civil Service Commission, despite her being a Democrat. She would serve 14 years on that Commission from 1993 to 2007. In 1997, she founded Columbus' City Year Chapter and led the organization for 13 years. In 2005, she opened her own art gallery called "Star Arts Gallery Limited."

In 2006, Kevin Boyce, who was a Columbus City Council member at the time, had encouraged her to apply to fill a seat vacancy. In January 2007, she was appointed to Columbus City Council after a seat became vacant. In the 2007 election, Tyson defeated Republican Heidi Samuel by 64.5%. In the 2012 election for Ohio's 3rd Congressional District, she lost the Democratic primary to Joyce Beatty. In 2016, she was selected as the Council President Pro Tempore by her fellow council members. That same year she sponsored a city ordinance to raise the age to buy tobacco to 21 years old.

In 2017, Tyson won reelection to the Columbus City Council, alongside fellow incumbents Shannon Hardin and Mitchell Brown. That same year Tyson co-sponsored an $1.1 million funding package to help redevelop buildings for the Pointdexter Village Museum.

In 2021, as the city council chair for the Health and Human Services Committee, Tyson encouraged the public to wear masks and get vaccinated during the COVID-19 pandemic.

After deciding not to run for another term, Tyson retired as city councilwoman on December 31, 2021. She spent 14 years on the council. Throughout her time as council member, she had been involved with numerous projects. She also assisted in launching a complete review of the Columbus zoning code. During her time on the council's Finance Committee, she spearheaded the effort to pass Columbus' largest General Fund and Capital Improvement Budgets. She advocated for the established of the Commission on Black Girls in 2018, which researches and analyzes Black girls' quality of life in the city and state. She also spearheaded the passage and implementation of the Columbus CROWN Act that aims to bans hair discrimination.

== Affiliations ==
Tyson was a board member and Finance Committee member for the National League of Cities (NLC). She was President of the NLC's National Black Caucus of Local Elected Officials and a member of the Ohio Municipal League. She had also served as the Services to Youth chair of The Links, Inc. Additionally, she was a board member of the Columbus Education Commission, Community Shelter Board, Great Columbus Art Council, and the Phoenix Theater Board. She has also been shown to be a member of Columbus Carrousels Inc. as of 2011.

== Awards and honors ==
In 1996, Tyson was honored as Women of Achievement by Columbus' YWCA chapter. In 2012, she was awarded the Dr. Martin Luther King, Jr. Award alongside Reverend Dale Snyder by the Columbus Education Association.

In 2022, the city of Columbus renamed the Cultural Arts Center in Tyson's honor for her contributions to the arts and the center is now called the "Priscilla R. Tyson Cultural Arts Center."
