= United States House Rules Subcommittee on Legislative and Budget Process =

Subcommittee of Committee on Rules
- Active United States House of Representatives; 119th Congress

Leadership
- Chair: Nick Langworthy (R)
- Ranking Member: Teresa Leger Fernandez (D)

Structure
- Seats: 6 (6 currently filled) 4/4 2/2
- Political parties: Majority (4): Republican (4); Minority (2): Democratic (2)

Meeting place
- H312, The Capitol; Washington, D.C. 20515

Phone number
- (202)-225-9191

The Subcommittee on Legislative and Budget Process is a subcommittee within the House Rules Committee.

According to the Committee rules, this Subcommittee has general responsibility for measures or matters related to relations between the Congress and the Executive Branch.

== Members, 117th Congress ==
Majority	Minority
Joe Morelle, Chair; Mary Gay Scanlon; Deborah K. Ross; Joe Neguse; Jim McGovern	Michael Burgess, Ranking Member; Tom Cole

== Members, 116th Congress ==
Majority	Minority
Alcee Hastings, Chair; Joe Morelle, Vice Chair; Mary Gay Scanlon; Donna Shalala; Jim McGovern	Rob Woodall, Ranking Member; Michael Burgess

== Members, 115th Congress ==
Majority	Minority
Rob Woodall, Georgia, Chairman; Michael C. Burgess, Texas; Bradley Byrne, Alabama; Dan Newhouse, Washington; Ken Buck, Colorado	Alcee Hastings, Florida, Ranking Member; Jared Polis, Colorado
