= Brian Keane (political advisor) =

American author and environmentalist

Brian F. Keane
- Occupations: Author, environmentalist

Brian F. Keane is an American author and environmentalist who served as a legislative assistant to Congressman Les Aspin and an aide to Congressman Joe Moakley. He was the former presidential campaign advisor to the late US Senator Paul Tsongas. He served as director of External Affairs at Conservation Law Foundation for four years and left this post in 2002 when he founded his company, SmartPower Inc.

== Career ==
Keane was the former president of the American University Alumni Association. He is a former board member of the Center for Environmental Policy at American University.

Keane is a notable public speaker on energy efficiency and renewable energy.

In 2005, Keane was named in Connecticut's "Outstanding Forty Under 40". He has been awarded the Green Power Pilot Award by the EPA and the US Department of Energy.

== Books ==
In October 2012, Lyons Press published Keane's book, Green Is Good: Save Money, Make Money, and Help Your Community Profit from Clean Energy.
