= United States House Rules Subcommittee on Rules and the Organization of the House =

Subcommittee of Committee on Rules
- Active United States House of Representatives; 119th Congress

Leadership
- Chair: Michelle Fischbach (R)
- Ranking Member: Mary Gay Scanlon (D)

Structure
- Seats: 6 (6 currently filled) 4/4 2/2
- Political parties: Majority (4): Republican (4); Minority (2): Democratic (2)

Meeting place
- H312, The Capitol; Washington, D.C. 20515

Phone number
- (202)-225-9191

The Subcommittee on Rules and Organization of the House is a subcommittee within the House Rules Committee

Under the Committee rules, as amended for the 110th Congress, the Rules and the Organization of the House subcommittee will have general responsibility for measures or matters related to relations between the two Houses of Congress, relations between the Congress and the Judiciary, and internal operations of the House.

This subcommittee has the primary responsibility for the continued examination of the committee structure and jurisdictional issues of all House Committees.

In the past, the subcommittee has considered measures dealing with "fast track" procedures for consideration of trade legislation, prohibitions on unfunded mandates, the recodification of the rules of the House, issues relating to a 21st-century Congress and the impact of technology on the process and procedures of the House.

== Members, 117th Congress ==
Majority	Minority
Norma J. Torres, Chair; Ed Perlmutter, Vice Chair; Mary Gay Scanlon; Joe Neguse; Jim McGovern	Guy Reschenthaler, Ranking Member; Tom Cole

== Members, 116th Congress ==
Majority	Minority
Norma Torres, Chair; Ed Perlmutter, Vice Chair; Mary Gay Scanlon; Joe Morelle; Jim McGovern	Debbie Lesko, Ranking Member; Rob Woodall

== Members, 115th Congress ==
Majority	Minority
Doug Collins, Georgia, Chairman; Bradley Byrne, Alabama; Dan Newhouse, Washington; Liz Cheney, Wyoming; Pete Sessions, Texas	Louise Slaughter, New York, until March 16, 2018; Jim McGovern, Massachusetts, Ranking Member; Norma Torres, California, since September 12, 2018
