= Friends of Ireland (U.S. Congress) =

Organization in the US congress on Northern Ireland

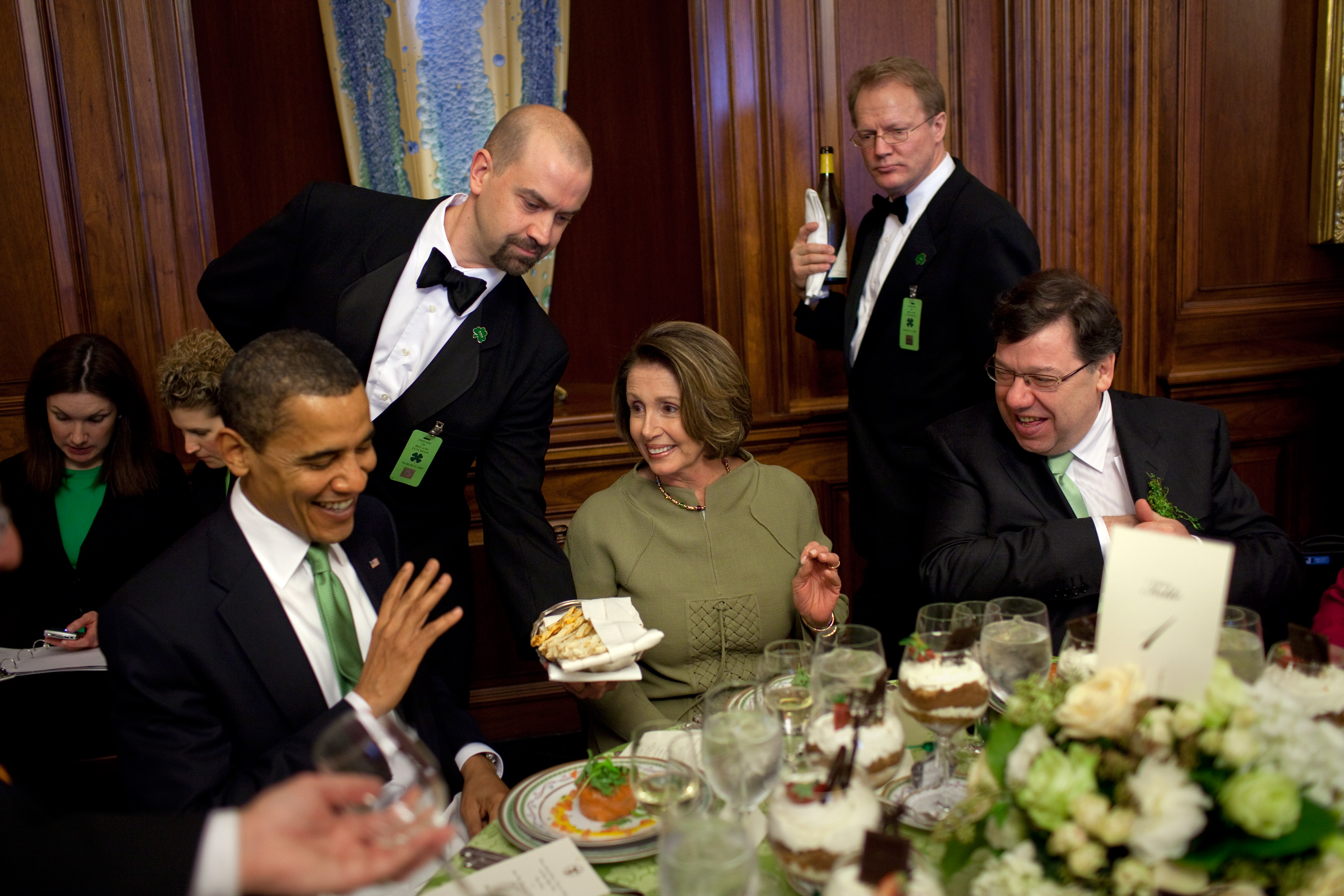
House Speaker Nancy Pelosi hosts the 2009 Friends of Ireland luncheon held annually in Washington D.C. With her are President Barack Obama and Taoiseach Brian Cowen.

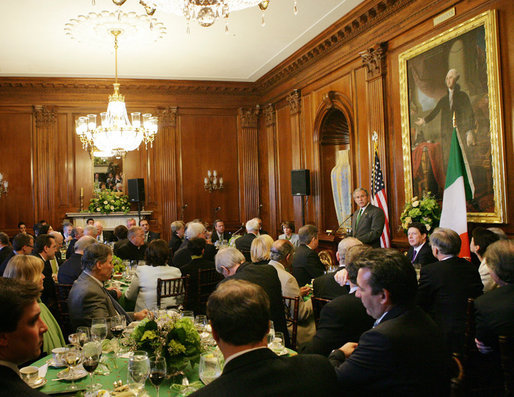
President George W. Bush speaks at the 2008 Friends of Ireland luncheon in the Rayburn Room of the U.S. Capitol.

Congressional Friends of Ireland Caucus in the 118th United States Congress

The Congressional Friends of Ireland, or Friends of Ireland, is an organization in the United States Congress that was founded in 1981 by Irish-American politicians Senator Ted Kennedy, Senator Daniel Moynihan and House Speaker Tip O'Neill to support initiatives for peace and reconciliation in Northern Ireland.

"The Friends of Ireland is a bipartisan group of Senators and Representatives opposed to violence and terrorism in Northern Ireland and dedicated to maintaining a United States policy that promotes a just, lasting, and peaceful settlement of the conflict that has cost more than 3,100 lives over the past quarter century", according to a statement by Kennedy in the Senate on 22 March 1994.

Representative Richard Neal (D-Massachusetts) is the current chair of this bipartisan group of senators and representatives. In chapter 9 of his book "Irish America and the Ulster Conflict 1968-1995," (Blackstaff Press, 1995) Andrew J. Wilson writes that the Congressional Friends of Ireland played a significant role in the Anglo-Irish Agreement of 1985.

Prior to the formation of the caucus in 1981, the phrase "Congressional friends of Ireland" was in use in the United States as early as 1920 when The New York Times wrote, "An editorial article in the current issue of The Freeman gives the Congressional friends of Ireland and the Irish vote a gentle but somewhat disconcerting prod."

The group has been involved with several ceremonial luncheons and receptions for Irish and United States political leaders.

== Membership ==
In the 119th Congress, the membership is as follows:

=== Leadership ===
- Jahana Hayes (D-CT)
- Richard Neal (D-MA)
- Mike Kelly (R-PA)

=== Members ===
- Rep. Gabe Amo (D-RI)
- Rep. Wesley Bell (D-MO)
- Rep. Brendan Boyle (D-PA)
- Rep. Jim Costa (D-CA)
- Rep. Joe Courtney (D-CT)
- Rep. Pat Fallon (R-TX)
- Rep. Scott Fitzgerald (R-WI)
- Rep. Brian Fitzpatrick (R-PA)
- Rep. Chrissy Houlahan (D-PA)
- Rep. John Joyce (R-PA)
- Rep. Bill Keating (D-MA)
- Rep. Tim Kennedy (D-NY)
- Rep. Bob Latta (R-OH)
- Rep. Mike Lawler (R-NY)
- Rep. Stephen Lynch (D-MA)
- Rep. Ryan Mackenzie (R-PA)
- Rep. Seth Magaziner (D-RI)
- Rep. Nicole Malliotakis (R-NY)
- Rep. Brian Mast (R-FL)
- Rep. Betty McCollum (D-MN)
- Rep. Jim McGovern (D-MA)
- Rep. Riley Moore (R-WV)
- Rep. Seth Moulton (D-MA)
- Rep. Kevin Mullin (D-CA)
- Rep. Greg Murphy (R-NC)
- Rep. Frank Pallone (D-NJ)
- Rep. Chellie Pingree (D-ME)
- Rep. Mike Quigley (D-IL)
- Rep. Mary Gay Scanlon (D-PA)
- Rep. Adam Smith (D-WA)
- Rep. Bryan Steil (R-WI)
- Rep. Tom Suozzi (D-NY)
