= United States House Committee on Rules =

Standing committee of the United States House of Representatives

House Rules Committee
Standing committee
- Active United States House of Representatives; 119th Congress

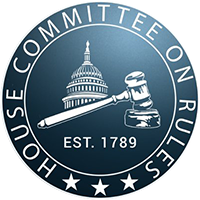

History
- Formed: April 2, 1789

Leadership
- Chair: Virginia Foxx (R); Since 2025
- Ranking Member: Jim McGovern (D); Since 2023

Structure
- Seats: 13 (13 currently filled) 9/9 4/4
- Political parties: Majority (9): Republican (9); Minority (4): Democratic (4)

Jurisdiction
- Purpose: Special Rules and Original Jurisdiction
- Policy areas: Rules and joint rules (other than those relating to the Code of Official Conduct) and the order of business of the House and Recesses and final adjournments of Congress.
- Senate counterpart: Committee on Rules and Administration

Subcommittees
- Legislative and Budget Process; Rules and Organization of the House

Meeting place
- H312, The Capitol; Washington, D.C. 20515

Website
- rules.house.gov (Republican) democrats-rules.house.gov (Democratic)

Phone number
- (202)-225-9191

The Committee on Rules (or more commonly the Rules Committee) is a committee of the United States House of Representatives. It is responsible for the rules under which bills will be presented to the House of Representatives, unlike other committees, which often deal with a specific area of policy. The committee is often considered one of the most powerful committees as it influences the introduction and process of legislation through the House. Thus it has garnered the nickname the "traffic cop of Congress". A "special rule" resolution (also referred to simply as a "rule") is a simple resolution of the House of Representatives, usually reported by the Committee on Rules, to permit the immediate consideration of a legislative measure, notwithstanding the usual order of business, and to prescribe conditions for its debate and amendment.

== Jurisdiction ==
The 'regular' process to pass a bill in the house is complicated and prone to delays and obstruction by the minority. Because of this, in practice, bills (other than those that are uncontroversial) are almost always debated under a so-called 'special rule' reported by the Rules Committee. This rule usually restricts the lengths of debate and number and type of amendments allowed (if any).

=== Special rules ===
When a bill is reported out of another committee with legislative jurisdiction, it is placed on the appropriate House Calendar for debate. Common practice, though, is for bills reported from committees to be considered in the Rules Committee, which then passes a so-called "special rule" (a resolution allowing for consideration of a bill, establishing how long and under what rules the full body will debate the proposition). A "special rule" resolution (also known simply as a "rule") is privileged under the Standing Rules of the House, meaning it is immediately subject to a debate and a vote by the full House upon being reported by the Rules Committee. If a "special rule" resolution providing for consideration of a bill is passed, then such bill must be considered by the House at such a time and under such limitations as the resolution has set. In practice, a bill can get to a floor vote only if a "special rule" resolution providing for its consideration is passed (unless the Speaker grants a vote on suspension of the rules, which requires two-thirds of votes cast in order to pass).

Consideration by the full body can occur in one of two forums: the Committee of the Whole, or on the floor of the full House of Representatives itself. Different traditions govern whether the Committee of the Whole or the House itself will debate a given resolution, and the Rules Committee generally sets the forum under which a proposition will be debated and the amendment/time limitations for every measure, too. For instance, there might be a limit on the number or types of amendments (proposed changes to the bill). Amendments might only be allowed to specific sections of the bill, or no amendments might be allowed at all. Besides control over amendments, the rule issued by the Rules Committee also determines the amount of speaking time assigned on each bill or resolution. If the leadership wants a bill pushed forward quietly, for instance, there might be no debate time scheduled; if they want attention, they might allow time for lengthy speeches in support of the bill.

Between control over amendments, debate, and when measures will be considered, the Rules Committee exerts vast power in the House. As such, the majority party will usually be very keen on controlling it tightly. While most House committees maintain membership in a rough proportion to the full chamber (if the majority party controls 55% of the House, it will tend to have 55% of committee seats), membership on the Rules Committee is disproportionately in favor of the majority party. Furthermore, the rules committee typically operates in a very partisan fashion, advancing "special rule" resolutions to the floor on straight party line votes in nearly all cases.

== History ==
The Rules Committee was formed on April 2, 1789, during the first Congress. However, it had nowhere near the powerful role it has today. Instead, it merely proposed general rules for the House to follow when debating bills (rather than passing a special rule for each bill), and was dissolved after proposing these general rules. These general rules still have a great impact on the tone of the House floor today.

The Rules Committee, for a long time, lay dormant. For the first fifty years of its existence, it accomplished little beyond simply reaffirming these rules, and its role was very noncontroversial. On June 16, 1841, it made a major policy change, reducing from 2/3 to 1/2 the fraction of votes needed in the House to close debate and vote on a bill.

In 1880, the modern Rules Committee began to emerge from the reorganization of the House Committees. When the Republican Party took over the House in the election of 1880, they quickly realized the power that the Rules Committee possessed. One member, Thomas Brackett Reed (R-Maine), used a seat on the Rules Committee to vault himself to the Speakership, and gained so much power that he was referred to as "Czar Reed".

In the 1890s and 1900s, Reed and his successor, Joseph Gurney Cannon (R-Illinois) used the Rules Committee to centralize the power of the Speakership. Although their power to place members in committees and perform other functions was limited by a forced rule change in 1910, the Rules Committee retained its power. However, it ceased to function as the personal project of the Speaker, as it had originally; instead, as the seniority system took root, it was captured by a coalition of conservative Democrats and Republicans. This state of affairs would continue until the 1960s.

In 1961, Speaker Sam Rayburn (D-Texas), acting on the wishes of the new President John F. Kennedy and the Democratic Study Group, introduced a bill to enlarge the committee from 12 members to 15, to decrease the power of the arch-conservative chair, Howard W. Smith (D-Virginia). The bill passed, 217 votes to 212. However, it was only partially successful; the Rules Committee continued to block legislation including civil rights and education bills.

By 1975, however, the Rules Committee was firmly under the command of the Speaker once again. Under Tip O'Neill (D-Mass.), the Speaker was given authority under House Democratic Caucus rules to appoint all Rules Committee Democrats subject to caucus ratification, and in 1989 the Republican Conference did the same. As before, its primary role is to come up with special rules, to help or obstruct the chances of legislation reported to it.

== General types of rules ==
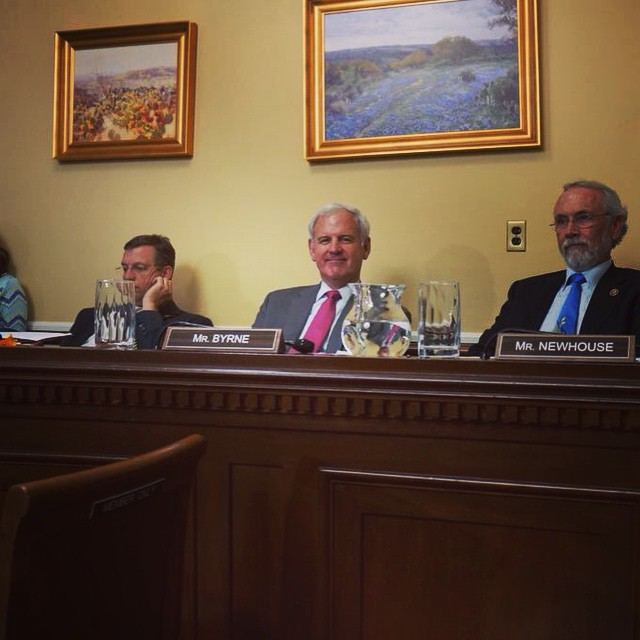
Representative Bradley Byrne while in session. He served on the House Committee on Rules from 2015 to 2018.

The Rules Committee issues the following types of "special rule" resolutions:

- Open rule: Allows any member to offer any amendment in compliance with house rules under the five minute rule (a member argues for the amendment for 5 minutes, an opponent then argues against the amendment for 5 minutes, other members may then "strike the last word" to speak further on the Amendment, and the house then votes on the amendment). Debate continues until no one offers an amendment. This type of Rule has not been used since June 10, 2014.
- Modified open rule: Much like an open rule, but may require amendments to be preprinted in the congressional record beforehand, and may impose a total time limit for the consideration of all amendments, or for debate on each amendment. This type of rule has not been used by action of the Committee since May 26th, 2016. One such rule was included in the 118th Congress's Rules package.
- Structured rule – Members submit amendments to the rules committee, and the rules committee selects which amendments may be considered on the floor.
- Closed rule – Eliminates the opportunity to amend the bill on the floor, except under unanimous consent.

Most "special rule" resolutions offer time for "general debate" before any amendment consideration begins (it is also possible for the rules committee to issue a rule for "general debate" only and later issue a second rule for amendment consideration) and allow for one motion to send the bill back to its committee of origination, with or without instructions for how to modify the bill. Such resolutions may also include necessary authority for district work periods, and may waive or modify certain points of order or rules of the house if desired by the committee, and the committee is also allowed to self-execute amendments right in the rule rather than delegating this ability to the full house floor.

== Members, 119th Congress ==
Majority	Minority
Virginia Foxx, North Carolina, Chair; Michelle Fischbach, Minnesota; Ralph Norman, South Carolina; Chip Roy, Texas; Erin Houchin, Indiana; Nick Langworthy, New York; Austin Scott, Georgia; Morgan Griffith, Virginia; Brian Jack, Georgia	Jim McGovern, Massachusetts, Ranking Member; Mary Gay Scanlon, Pennsylvania; Joe Neguse, Colorado; Teresa Leger Fernandez, New Mexico

Resolutions electing members: H.Res. 38 (R), H.Res. 40 (D)

== Subcommittees ==
The Rules Committee operates with two subcommittees, one focusing on legislative and budget matters and one focusing on the internal operations of the House.

Subcommittee	Chair	Ranking Member
Legislative and Budget Process	Nick Langworthy	Mary Gay Scanlon
Rules and the Organization of the House	Michelle Fischbach	Teresa Leger Fernandez

Source: Full membership

== Leadership, 1849–1853 and 1880–present ==
The Committee on Rules was created as a select committee but became a standing committee for the 31st and 32nd Congresses (1849–1853). In 1853, the panel reverted to being a select committee and remained one until 1880.

From 1880 to the revolt against Speaker Joseph Gurney Cannon in March 1910, the Speaker of the House also served as chair of the Rules Committee.

Beginning in 1999 with Republican David Dreier of California, the chair of the Rules Committee became a member of the elected Republican leadership, appointed by the Speaker of the House of Representatives.

Howard W. Smith of Virginia is the longest-serving chair (1955–1967) since the committee's founding. David Dreier of California is the youngest chair of the Rules Committee, assuming the position at the age of 46. He is also the longest-serving chair (1999–2007, 2011–2013) since 1967. Louise Slaughter of New York is the first woman to chair the committee (2007–2011).

Chairs
Name	Party	State	Start	End	Notes
David Kaufman	Democratic	Texas	1849	1851	Died in office January 31, 1851
George Jones	Democratic	Tennessee	1851	1853	
Samuel Randall	Democratic	Pennsylvania	1880	1881	
Warren Keifer	Republican	Ohio	1881	1883	
John Carlisle	Democratic	Kentucky	1883	1889	
Thomas Reed	Republican	Maine	1889	1891	1st term
Charles Crisp	Democratic	Georgia	1891	1895	
Thomas Reed	Republican	Maine	1895	1899	2nd term
David Henderson	Republican	Iowa	1899	1903	
Joseph Cannon	Republican	Illinois	1903	1910	
John Dalzell	Republican	Pennsylvania	1910	1911	
Robert Henry	Democratic	Texas	1911	1917	
Edward Pou	Democratic	North Carolina	1917	1919	1st term
Philip Campbell	Republican	Kansas	1919	1923	
Bertrand Snell	Republican	New York	1923	1931	
Edward Pou	Democratic	North Carolina	1931	1934	2nd term. Died in office April 1, 1934.
William Bankhead	Democratic	Alabama	1934	1935	
John O'Connor	Democratic	New York	1935	1939	
Adolph Sabath	Democratic	Illinois	1939	1947	1st term
Leo Allen	Republican	Illinois	1947	1949	1st term
Adolph Sabath	Democratic	Illinois	1949	1952	2nd term. Died in office November 6, 1952.
Leo Allen	Republican	Illinois	1953	1955	2nd term
Howard Smith	Democratic	Virginia	1955	1967	
William Colmer	Democratic	Mississippi	1967	1973	
Ray Madden	Democratic	Indiana	1973	1977	
James Delaney	Democratic	New York	1977	1979	
Richard Bolling	Democratic	Missouri	1979	1983	
Claude Pepper	Democratic	Florida	1983	1989	Died in office May 30, 1989
Joe Moakley	Democratic	Massachusetts	1989	1995	
Gerald Solomon	Republican	New York	1995	1999	
Dave Dreier	Republican	California	1999	2007	1st term
Louise Slaughter	Democratic	New York	2007	2011	
Dave Dreier	Republican	California	2011	2013	2nd term
Pete Sessions	Republican	Texas	2013	2019	
Jim McGovern	Democratic	Massachusetts	2019	2023	
Tom Cole	Republican	Oklahoma	2023	2024	
Michael Burgess	Republican	Texas	2024	2025	
Virginia Foxx	Republican	North Carolina	2025	present	

Ranking members
Name	Party	State	Start	End
Adolph Sabath	Democratic	Illinois	1947	1949
Leo Allen	Republican	Illinois	1949	1953
Howard Smith	Democratic	Virginia	1953	1955
Leo Allen	Republican	Illinois	1955	1961
Clarence Brown	Republican	Ohio	1961	1965
Allen Smith	Republican	California	1965	1973
David Martin	Republican	Nebraska	1973	1975
Jimmy Quillen	Republican	Tennessee	1975	1991
Gerald Solomon	Republican	New York	1991	1995
Joe Moakley	Democratic	Massachusetts	1995	2001
Martin Frost	Democratic	Texas	2001	2005
Louise Slaughter	Democratic	New York	2005	2007
Dave Dreier	Republican	California	2007	2011
Louise Slaughter	Democratic	New York	2011	2018
Jim McGovern	Democratic	Massachusetts	2018	2019
Tom Cole	Republican	Oklahoma	2019	2023
Jim McGovern	Democratic	Massachusetts	2023	present

== Historical members and subcommittees ==
=== 114th Congress ===
Majority	Minority
Pete Sessions, Texas's 32nd, Chair; Virginia Foxx, North Carolina's 5th, Vice Chair; Tom Cole, Oklahoma's 4th; Rob Woodall, Georgia's 7th; Michael C. Burgess, Texas's 26th; Steve Stivers, Ohio's 15th; Doug Collins, Georgia's 9th; Bradley Byrne, Alabama's 1st; Dan Newhouse, Washington's 4th	Louise Slaughter, New York's 25th, Ranking Member; James P. McGovern, Massachusetts's 2nd; Alcee Hastings, Florida's 20th; Jared Polis, Colorado's 2nd

Sources: H.Res. 6 (Chairs), H.Res. 7 (D), H.Res. 17 (R) and H.Res. 22 (D).

=== 115th Congress ===
Majority	Minority
Pete Sessions, Texas's 32nd, Chair; Tom Cole, Oklahoma's 4th, Vice Chair; Rob Woodall, Georgia's 7th; Michael C. Burgess, Texas's 26th; Doug Collins, Georgia's 9th; Bradley Byrne, Alabama's 1st; Dan Newhouse, Washington's 4th; Ken Buck, Colorado's 4th; Liz Cheney, Wyoming's at-large	Jim McGovern, Massachusetts's 2nd, Ranking Member; Louise Slaughter, New York's 25th, until March 16, 2018; Alcee Hastings, Florida's 20th; Jared Polis, Colorado's 2nd, Vice Ranking Member; Norma Torres, California's 35th, from April 11, 2018

Sources: H.Res. 6 (R), H.Res. 7 (D), H.Res. 816 (D)

=== 116th Congress ===
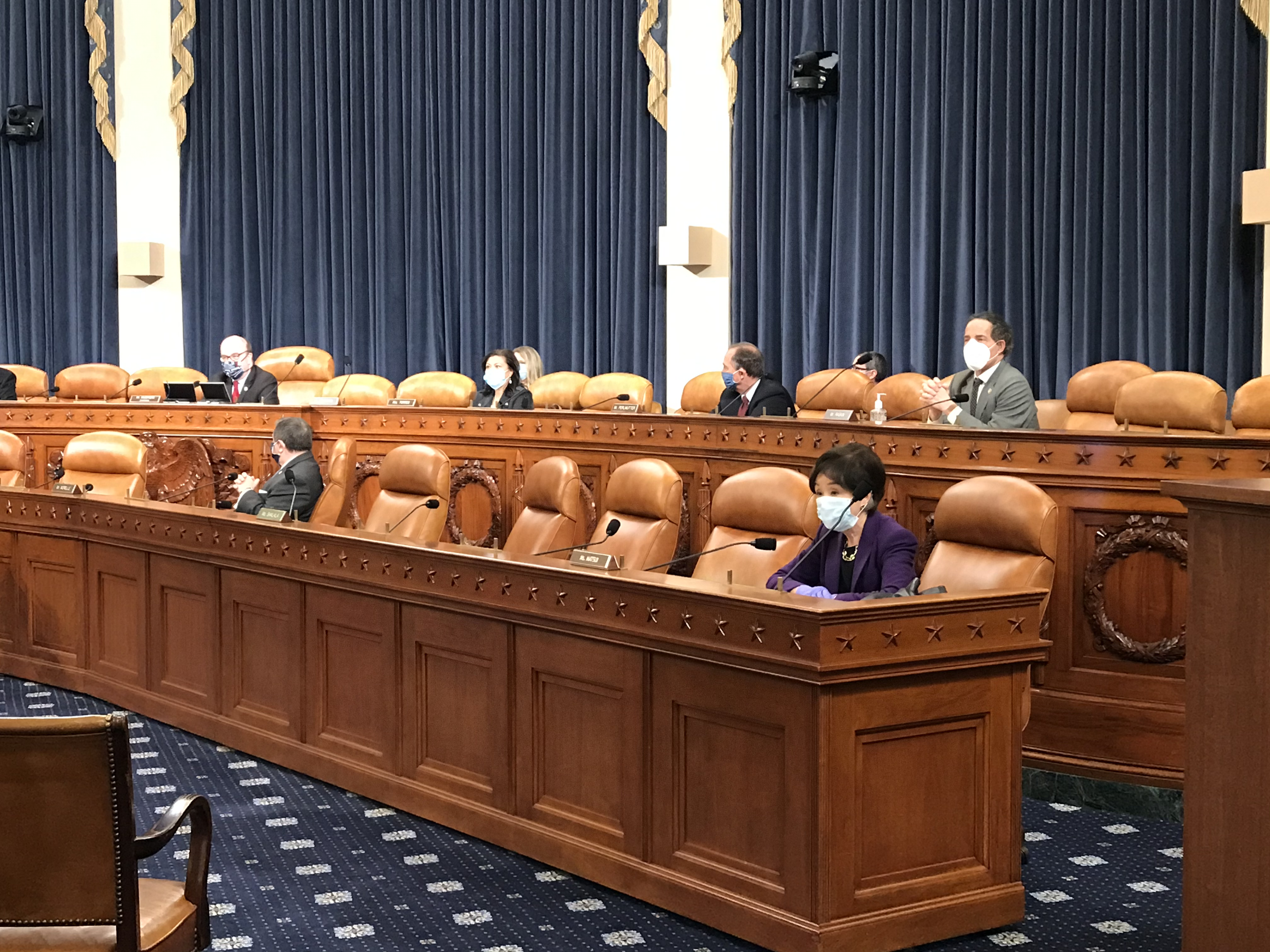
Members of the Committee social distancing at a hearing during the COVID-19 pandemic in April 2020

Majority	Minority
Jim McGovern, Massachusetts's 2nd, Chair; Alcee Hastings, Florida's 20th, Vice Chair; Norma Torres, California's 35th; Ed Perlmutter, Colorado's 7th; Jamie Raskin, Maryland's 8th; Mary Gay Scanlon, Pennsylvania's 5th; Joseph Morelle, New York's 25th; Donna Shalala, Florida's 27th; Mark DeSaulnier, California's 11th (until April 22, 2020); Doris Matsui, California's 6th (since April 22, 2020)	Tom Cole, Oklahoma's 4th, Ranking Member; Rob Woodall, Georgia's 7th; Michael C. Burgess, Texas's 26th; Debbie Lesko, Arizona's 8th

Sources: H.Res. 7 (Chair), H.Res. 8 (Ranking Member), H.Res. 24 (D), H.Res. 25 (R), H.Res. 26 (D), H.Res. 125 (D), H.Res. 934 (D)

=== 117th Congress ===
Majority	Minority
Jim McGovern, Massachusetts, Chair; Norma Torres, California; Ed Perlmutter, Colorado; Jamie Raskin, Maryland; Mary Gay Scanlon, Pennsylvania; Joseph Morelle, New York; Mark DeSaulnier, California, Vice-Chair; Deborah K. Ross, North Carolina; Joe Neguse, Colorado (since May 12, 2021)	Tom Cole, Oklahoma, Ranking Member; Michael C. Burgess, Texas; Guy Reschenthaler, Pennsylvania; Michelle Fischbach, Minnesota

Sources: H.Res. 35 (D), H.Res. 36 (R), H.Res. 63 (R), H.Res. 384 (D),

Subcommittees

Subcommittee	Chair	Ranking Member
Expedited Procedures	Jamie Raskin (D-MD)	Michelle Fischbach (R-MN)
Legislative and Budget Process	Joseph Morelle (D-NY)	Michael C. Burgess (R-TX)
Rules and the Organization of the House	Norma Torres (D-CA)	Guy Reschenthaler (R-PA)

=== 118th Congress ===
Majority	Minority
Michael C. Burgess, Texas, Chair; Tom Cole, Oklahoma, Chair (until April 10, 2024); Guy Reschenthaler, Pennsylvania, Vice Chair; Michelle Fischbach, Minnesota; Thomas Massie, Kentucky; Ralph Norman, South Carolina; Chip Roy, Texas; Erin Houchin, Indiana; Nick Langworthy, New York; Austin Scott, Georgia	Jim McGovern, Massachusetts, Ranking Member; Mary Gay Scanlon, Pennsylvania; Joe Neguse, Colorado; Teresa Leger Fernandez, New Mexico

Resolutions electing members: H.Res. 14 (Chair), H.Res. 15 (Ranking Member), H.Res. 56 (R), H.Res. 57 (D), H.Res. 1133 (R)

Subcommittees

Subcommittee	Chair	Ranking Member
Legislative and Budget Process	Michelle Fischbach	Teresa Leger Fernandez
Rules and the Organization of the House	Michael C. Burgess	Mary Gay Scanlon

== See also ==
- List of United States House of Representatives committees
- United States Senate Committee on Rules and Administration
