= Ermold v. Davis =

2025 6th Circuit Court of Appeals case

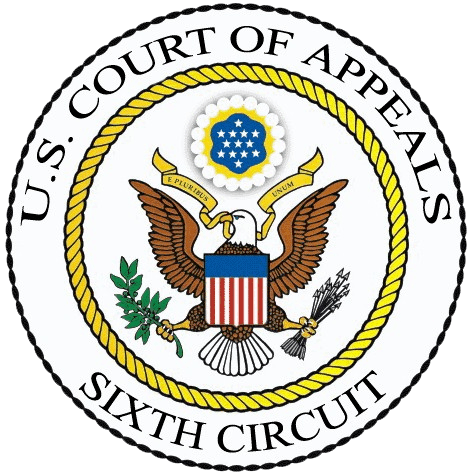
- Court: United States Court of Appeals for the Sixth Circuit
- Citations: David Ermold; David Moore v. Kim Davis, Text.

Case history
- Appealed to: Supreme Court of the United States

Ermold v. Davis was a Sixth Circuit case involving former Rowan County Clerk Kim Davis, who was sued and found personally liable for refusing to issue marriage licenses to same-sex couples following Obergefell v. Hodges. The Sixth Circuit rejected her argument that her First Amendment religious rights protected her from liability for her official state actions. Davis sought to appeal this decision to the Supreme Court, asking the Court to review the Sixth Circuit's ruling and, additionally, to overturn Obergefell. On November 10, 2025, the Supreme Court declined the petition for a writ of certiorari without comment, leaving the Sixth Circuit's ruling and the award of damages against Davis intact.

== U.S. Court of Appeals for the Sixth Circuit ==
On May 21, 2024, Kim Davis appealed the United States District Court for the Eastern District of Kentucky personal liability verdict, arguing she was entitled to qualified immunity, shielded by the Free Exercise Clause, and protected under the Kentucky Religious Freedom Restoration Act (RFRA). The case was argued on January 30, 2025, and the Sixth Circuit issued its decision on March 6, 2025. Judge Helene White wrote the opinion, joined by Judge Andre Mathis, with Judge Chad Readler concurring in part and in the judgment.

The Sixth Circuit affirmed the lower court's judgment against Davis, upholding the jury's award of damages.

=== Free exercise and state action ===
The court rejected Davis's claim that her conduct was protected by the First Amendment's Free Exercise Clause. It held that the First Amendment does not protect a government official from liability for state action taken under color of law, as her actions in denying the licenses violated the fundamental constitutional rights of the plaintiffs.

=== Qualified immunity ===
The court declined to revisit its prior rulings in the case, applying the "law-of-the-case" doctrine to affirm that Davis was not entitled to qualified immunity because the right to same-sex marriage was clearly established by Obergefell v. Hodges in 2015.

=== Other defenses ===
The court also rejected Davis's defense under the Kentucky RFRA and upheld the jury's award for emotional distress damages, finding the plaintiffs' testimony was sufficient to support the award.

== Supreme Court petition ==
Following the Sixth Circuit's decision upholding the personal liability verdict against Davis, a petition for a writ of certiorari was filed with the U.S. Supreme Court on July 24, 2025, asking the Court to review the ruling on government official immunity and, separately, to overturn Obergefell v. Hodges.

The petition included three issues. First, whether the First Amendment free exercise clause provides an affirmative defense to tort liability based solely on emotional distress damages with no actual damages in the same manner as the free speech clause under Snyder v. Phelps. Second, whether a government official stripped of Eleventh Amendment immunity and sued in their individual capacity based solely on emotional distress damages with no actual damages is entitled to assert individual capacity and personal First Amendment defenses in the same or similar manner as any other individual defendant like in Snyder. Third, whether Obergefell v. Hodges and the doctrine of substantive due process should be overturned.

The case was subsequently distributed for the Justices' private conference on November 7, 2025. On November 10, 2025, the Supreme Court declined to hear the case without comment.

== Reactions to Supreme Court denial ==
=== Support ===
==== Politicians ====
Senator Michael Bennet: "I'm glad the Supreme Court affirmed LGBTQ+ equality and refused to hear a case attempting to overturn same-sex couples' constitutional rights. Every person, no matter who they are or who they love, deserves the right to marry and share the freedoms granted to every American."

Representative Mary Gay Scanlon, in response to the question "Did you hear the Supreme Court rejected Kim Davis’s petition to overturn Obergefell?", replied: "Yes, I did. Yes. That was the best news we’ve had out of the Supreme Court in quite a while."

Representative Andrea Salinas: "The Supreme Court made the right decision not to hear a challenge to Obergefell v. Hodges, which legalized same-sex marriage nationwide. As it should be, same-sex marriage will remain a constitutional right."

Michigan Attorney General Dana Nessel: "I am relieved for today's decision reaffirming same-sex couples' continued right to dignity and protection under the law, but we cannot take those protections for granted. Members of this Supreme Court have already told us they are willing to overturn Obergefell. It's only a matter of time before they do. Today's victory allows us a reprieve, an opportunity to bring our state Constitution into alignment with the protections our residents are entitled to and have enjoyed for more than a decade. Now is the time to act."

Pennsylvania State Senator Tim Kearney, when asked, "Did you hear that the Supreme Court rejected Kim Davis's petition to overturn Obergefell?", replied, "I did hear that, yes." The questioner then said, "Awesome. How do you feel?" Kearney replied, "Great."

Human Rights Campaign President Kelley Robinson: "Today, love won again. When public officials take an oath to serve their communities, that promise extends to everyone — including LGBTQ+ people. The Supreme Court made clear today that refusing to respect the constitutional rights of others does not come without consequences. Thanks to the hard work of HRC and so many, marriage equality remains the law of the land through Obergefell v. Hodges and the Respect for Marriage Act. Even so, we must remain vigilant. It's no secret that there are many in power right now working to undermine our freedoms — including marriage equality — and attack the dignity of our community any chance they get. Last week, voters rejected the politics of fear, division, and hate, and chose leaders who believe in fairness, freedom, and the future. In race after race, the American people rejected anti-transgender attacks and made history electing pro-equality candidates up and down the ballot. And from California to Virginia to New Jersey to New York City, LGBTQ+ voters and Equality Voters made the winning difference. We will never relent and will not stop fighting until all of us are free."

National LGBTQ Task Force Communications Director Cathy Renna: "Today's decision is not surprising given the long-shot status of Davis's claim, but it's a relief that the Supreme Court will not hear it, given the current makeup of the court itself. We hope that this settles the matter and marriage equality remains the law of the land for same-sex couples."

Lambda Legal CEO Kevin Jennings: "This frivolous case now belongs in the trash bin of history. But let's not be naïve: Our opponents are well-resourced and determined. They will keep trying to undo the progress we've made since Lambda Legal was founded 52 years ago. Now is not the time to let down our guard."

Lambda Legal Senior Director of Strategic Initiatives Jenny Pizer: "Today's decision rightly leaves marriage equality crystal clear and undisturbed. However, LGBTQ+ people and their families still need vigilance and protection. We secured the freedom to marry for same-sex couples over a decade ago in our landmark 2015 Supreme Court victory, Obergefell v. Hodges, thanks to the powerful stories of thousands of couples and their families throughout the country, including in our many court cases. The fundamental rights of liberty and equal protection that the Court affirmed back then remain essential for all American families today."

The legal director at the National Center for LGBTQ Rights, Shannon Minter: "In addition to its significance for same-sex couples, the Supreme Court's decision to decline review of Obergfell [sic] is also important for the many transgender people who are married or wish to marry. Before Obergefell, the validity of a transgender person's marriage could be called into question, with no assurance that states, the federal government, or third parties would recognize such marriages. Many transgender people faced devastating legal challenges to their marriages in child custody, spousal benefits, and inheritance cases — often with crushing outcomes that separated transgender parents from their children and left surviving transgender spouses or spouses married to a transgender person's marriage with no protection. Obergefell eliminated these uncertainties and provided transgender spouses and their families with much-needed stability and security."

=== Opposition ===
Liberty Counsel Founder and Chairman Mat Staver: "Davis was jailed, hauled before a jury, and now faces crippling monetary damages based on nothing more than purported hurt feelings. By denying this petition, the High Court has let stand a decision to strip a government defendant of their immunity and any personal First Amendment defense for their religious expression. This cannot be right because government officials do not shed their constitutional rights upon election. Like the abortion decision in Roe v. Wade, Obergefell was egregiously wrong from the start. This opinion has no basis in the Constitution. We will continue to work to overturn Obergefell. It is not a matter of if, but when the Supreme Court will overturn Obergefell."

== See also ==
- Same-sex marriage law in the United States by state
