= Claribel Alegría =

Nicaraguan-Salvadoran poet, essayist, novelist and journalist

Clara Isabel Alegría Vides
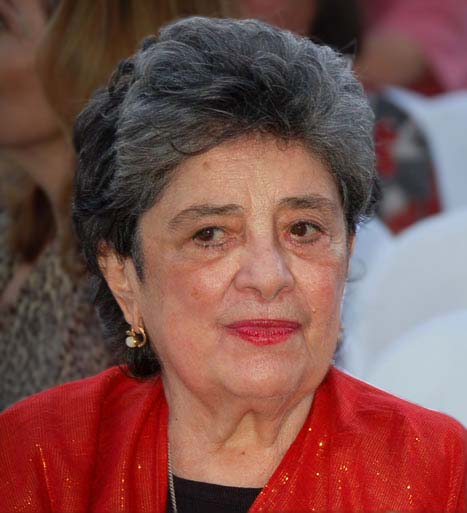
- Alegría at the 3rd annual International Poetry Festival in Granada.
- Born: 12 May 1924; Estelí, Nicaragua
- Died: 25 January 2018 (aged 93); Managua, Nicaragua
- Occupations: Poet, novelist
- Writing career
- Pen name: Claribel Alegría

Clara Isabel Alegría Vides (May 12, 1924 – January 25, 2018), also known by her pseudonym Claribel Alegría, was a Nicaraguan-Salvadoran poet, essayist, novelist, and journalist who was a major voice in the literature of contemporary Central America. She was awarded the 2006 Neustadt International Prize for Literature.

== Biography ==
Alegría was born in Estelí, Nicaragua, to a Nicaraguan father, Daniel Alegría, and a Salvadoran mother, Ana María Vides. Her cousin was activist Leonel Gómez Vides. When Claribel was nine months old, her father was sent into exile for protesting human rights violations occurring during the United States occupation of Nicaragua; as a result, Claribel grew up in Santa Ana, a city in western El Salvador, where her mother came from. Claribel Alegría considered herself to be Nicaraguan-Salvadorean. Although she was too young to read or write, she began composing poetry at the age of six and dictated them to her mother, who would write them down. Alegría consistently cited Rainer Maria Rilke's "Letters to a Young Poet" as the impetus for becoming a poet. At the age of seventeen, she published her first poems in Repertorio Americano, a Central American cultural supplement. Soon after, Mexican educator José Vasconcelos arranged for Alegría to attend finishing school in Hammond, Louisiana. In 1943, she moved to the United States and in 1948 received a B.A. in Philosophy and Letters from George Washington University. Alegría was committed to nonviolent resistance. She had a close association with the Sandinista National Liberation Front (FSLN), which overthrew Anastasio Somoza Debayle and took control of the Nicaraguan government in 1979. Alegría returned to Nicaragua in 1985 to aid in the reconstruction of Nicaragua.

Alegría later lived in Managua, Nicaragua. She died on 25 January 2018, aged 93.

== Career ==
Alegría's literary work reflects the style of the popular literary current in Central America during the 1950s and 1960s, "la generacion comprometida" (the committed generation). Like many other poets of her generation who are critical of their societies, she made claims for rights using a language which is often counter-literary.

Alegría published many books of poetry: Casting Off (2003), Sorrow (1999), Umbrales (1996), and La Mujer del Río (1989). She also published novels and children's stories, as well as testimonies (often in collaboration with her husband, DJ "Bud" Flakoll), such as They Won't Take Me Alive.

== Awards ==
- 1978 Cuban-sponsored Casa de las Américas for Sobrevivo ("I Survive"), a poetry collection. She was awarded this prize alongside Gioconda Belli.
- 2006 Neustadt International Prize for Literature.
- 2017 XXVI Premio Reina Sofía de Poesía Iberoamericana by the Universidad de Salamanca and the Spanish Patrimonio Nacional.

== Works ==
- Anillo de silencio (1948)
- Suite de amor, angustia y soledad (1950)
- Vigilias (1953)
- Acuario (1955)
- Tres cuentos (1958)
- Huésped de mi tiempo (1961)
- Vía única (1965)
- Cenizas de Izalco (1966)
- Aprendizaje (1970)
- Pasaré a cobrar y otros poemas (1973)
- Sobrevivo (1978, Premio Casa de las Américas de Poesía)
- La encrucijada salvadoreña (1980)
- Nicaragua: la revolución sandinista (1980)
- Flores del volcán; Suma y sigue (1981)
- No me agarran viva: la mujer salvadoreña en lucha (1983)
- Para Romper El Silencio: Resistencia Y lucha en las cárceles salvadoreñas (1983)
- Álbum familiar (1984)
- Despierta, mi bien, despierta (1986)
- Luisa en el país de la realidad (1987)
- Cenizas de Izalco (1989)
- Thresholds/Umbrales: Poems (1996)
- El Nino Que Buscaba A Ayer (1997)
- Soltando Amarras (2003)

=== In English translation ===
- Death of Somoza (1996)
- Family Album (1991)
- Fugues (1993)
- Flowers from the Volcano, trans. Carolyn Forché (Pittsburgh, University of Pittsburgh, 1983)
- Luisa in Realityland, trans. Darwin J. Flakoll (New York: Curbstone Press, 1987) ISBN 0-915306-70-0
- Sorrow, trans. Carolyn Forché (New York: Curbstone Press, 1999) ISBN 1-880684-63-2
- Soltando Amarras/Casting Off: Poems by Claribel Alegría, trans. Margaret Sayers Peden (Willimantic: Curbstone Press, 2003) ISBN 1-880684-98-5
- They Won't Take Me Alive: Salvadoran Women in Struggle for National Liberation (1990)
- Tunnel to Canto Grande (1996)
- Woman of the River (Pitt Poetry Series) (1989)

=== In anthology ===
- Ghost Fishing: An Eco-Justice Poetry Anthology (University of Georgia Press, 2018) ISBN 978-0820353159
