= Leonel Gómez Vides =

Salvadoran political activist (1940–2009)

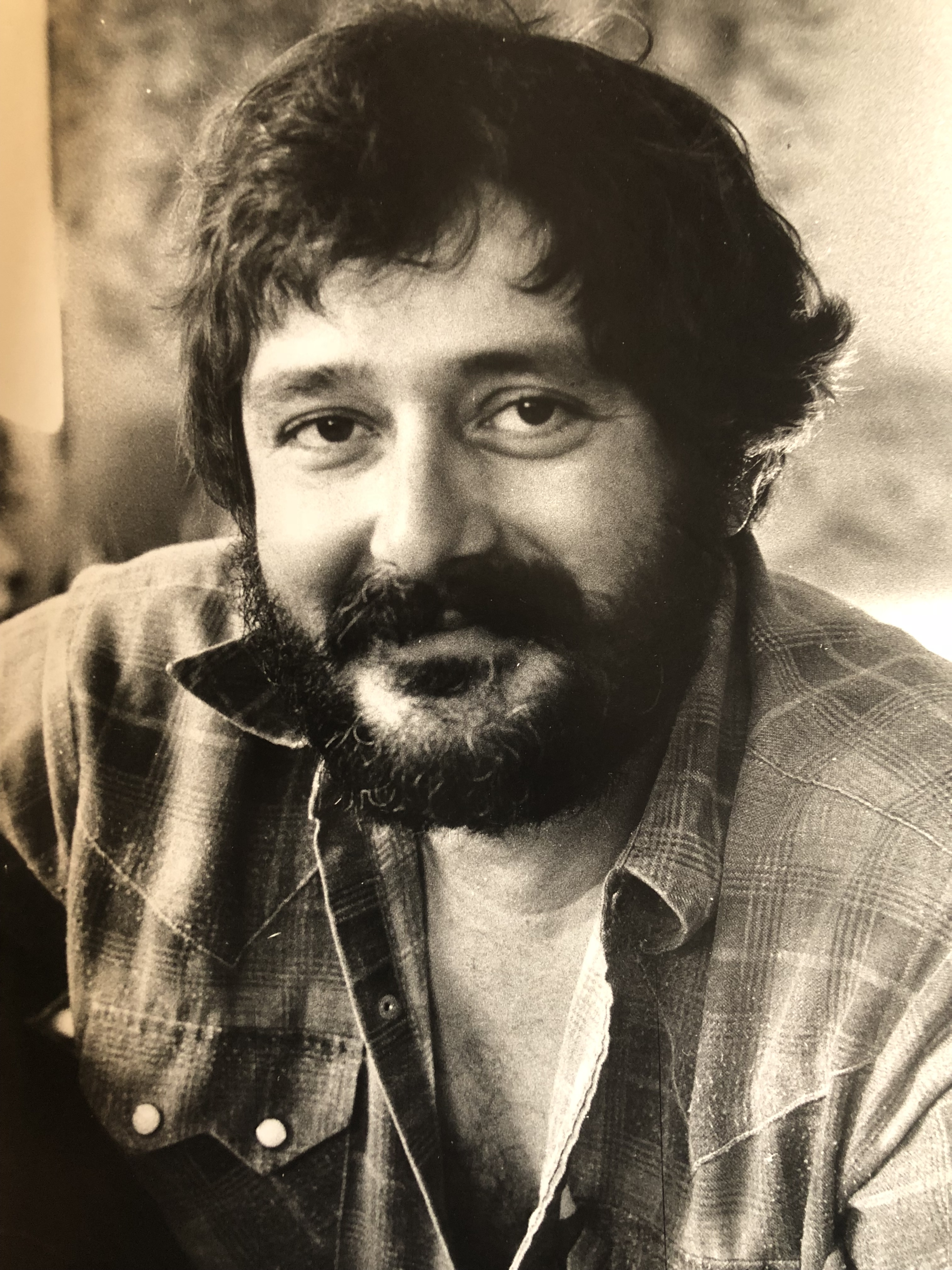
- Gómez in 1978
- Born: December 31, 1940; Santa Ana, El Salvador
- Died: November 25, 2009 (aged 68); San Salvador, El Salvador
- Occupation: Political activist

Leonel Eugenio Gómez Vides (December 31, 1940 – November 25, 2009) was a Salvadoran political activist.

Born into a wealthy family, Gómez worked on land reform issues on behalf of the poor. Following an assassination attempt in 1981, Gómez lived in exile in the United States for a number of years. While in exile, Gómez developed close relationships with American political figures such as Joe Moakley and Bill Walker. He returned to El Salvador in 1989 and helped broker the 1992 Chapultepec Peace Accords that ended the country's civil war. Gómez died in 2009 of a heart attack.

== Early life ==
Gómez was born on December 31, 1940, in Santa Ana, El Salvador. He grew up in the coffee-farming region around the city, in a well-off family he once described as being descended from "conquistadors, priests, and pirates". The family plantation, Gómez recalled, "covered about 100 city blocks". As a teenager, Gómez attended several secondary schools and the University of Pennsylvania in the United States, but returned to El Salvador before graduating to take over the family's plantation after his father died.

A good marksman, Gómez at one point served as the coach of the Salvadoran army Olympic rifle team. His deeds in the 1969 Football War against Honduras earned him lasting respect from some military officers. He was also a medal-winning motorcycle racer, winning the Central American championship in 1961. Gómez was married twice, to Eugenia B. Gómez and Teresa Arene; both marriages ended in divorce. Gómez and his first wife had two daughters.

== Political activist ==
Gómez spent his adult life in a variety of roles as a political activist. Early in his career, he was involved in organizing peasant unions among El Salvador's campesinos, becoming a prominent figure in the Salvadoran Communal Union. Gómez eventually became the general manager and deputy director of ISTA (Instituto Salvadoreño de Transformación Agraria), the Salvadoran land reform agency. Author Thomas Anderson described Gómez as "the real organizer of the land-reform movement". Gómez came to know American poet Carolyn Forché through his cousin, the poet Claribel Alegría. He introduced Forché to El Salvador and served as a mentor during her extensive time in the country just before the Salvadoran Civil War began in 1979.

As fighting worsened, Gómez battled corruption within ISTA and organized a June 1980 strike to press the issue. Since he was an advocate for land redistribution from large plantations to peasant co-operatives, Gómez alienated some members of his family, who considered him a class traitor. The historian Robert Wesson described him as a "maverick member of the upper classes". Gómez was viewed with suspicion by elements of both the left and right, as his political loyalties were hard to pin down, but nevertheless retained some trust from members in all factions. Fermán Cienfuegos, a guerilla leader, recalled that the FMLN affectionately nicknamed Gómez El Gordo.

In 1981, Rodolfo Viera, his superior at ISTA, was murdered alongside two American advisors at the Sheraton hotel in El Salvador. Gómez narrowly avoided being murdered himself, as he was also supposed to attend the dinner at which Viera was killed, but had not received his invitation in time. He was arrested and accused of secretly being the communist guerrilla Comandante Santiago (whose real identity was actually Carlos Consalvi). Gómez was released, only to narrowly escape death squads sent the next day by hiding under a pile of garbage.

Gómez subsequently spent time in exile in the United States. Working as an activist, Gómez was unable to persuade the US government to end its support for the authoritarian Salvadoran regime. However, he became known as an expert on the Salvadoran military. Gómez helped arrange public attention and pressure on the Salvadoran government with his extensive network of contacts in Washington, D.C. For instance, Gómez testified before the US Senate Subcommittee on Inter-American Affairs on March 11, 1981:

In conclusion, I ask you: Is this the kind of government you want to support? I ask you to think about the corruption, the bloodshed, the killings that have been perpetuated by the Salvadoran army time after time... What more do you need to know? How long will you have to wait until the American people rise up and tell you what everyone already knows?

— Leonel Gómez, 1981

While in exile, Gómez developed close relationships with politicians such as Senator Pat Leahy, Congressman Joe Moakley, and future Representative Jim McGovern, then working as an aide to Moakley. Moakley and Gómez first met shortly after the American invasion of Panama; Gómez was initially skeptical about the sincerity of a fresh American effort to end the fighting in El Salvador.

=== Return to El Salvador ===
Returning to El Salvador in late 1989, Gómez at first lived in the American embassy compound for his safety, thanks to his friendship with the American ambassador, Bill Walker. Walker warned Salvadoran leaders that Gómez was not to be harmed at the risk of severe fallout in Washington. Gómez introduced Walker to political leaders in El Salvador, such as ARENA chief Roberto D'Aubuisson and Vice Minister of Defense Orlando Zepeda. Congressman Moakley subsequently hired him to help investigate the 1989 murders of Jesuits in El Salvador, as part of a US congressional commission, the Moakley Commission. Academic and historian Teresa Whitfield has described Gómez's role as "a back-channel bridge builder and conduit of information," a function which "was as useful to all concerned as it was unique." Journalist Stephen Kinzer described him as "one of the best-informed people in El Salvador," noting his "macho bravado".

Gómez's work for the Moakley Commission led to a number of key breakthroughs, significantly increasing the pressure on El Salvador's government to come to a negotiated settlement with the rebels. In June 1991, working "quietly behind the scenes," he devised a meeting between Moakley, Walker, and the FMLN, that would be seen as a "turning point" in the peace process. Cienfuegos, a FMLN leader, had been skeptical that the American government was sincere about any peace agreement that included a governing role for the FMLN. Gómez arranged for Moakley to visit Santa Marta, a rebel-held area, in a sign of good faith, since there were fears of kidnap and the war was ongoing. Gómez's work played an important role in reaching the 1992 Chapultepec Peace Accords which ended the Salvadoran war.

== Later life ==
In later years, Gómez became an analyst and commentator on organized crime in El Salvador. He also continued with labor organizing work, and raised charitable funds for libraries, orphanages, and campesinos in El Salvador.

Gómez died of heart failure in a hospital in San Salvador on November 25, 2009. At his death, McGovern commented: "It's amazing to me that Leonel died of natural causes and wasn't murdered, given the hornet's nests he stirred up time and time again". Forché expressed a similar sentiment in her 2019 memoir What You Have Heard Is True, which centers on her friendship with Gómez. In 2019, Gómez was remembered by his brother-in-law as someone "accused of being a communist by the right and a CIA agent by the communists".
