= Mary Gay Scanlon =

American politician (born 1959)

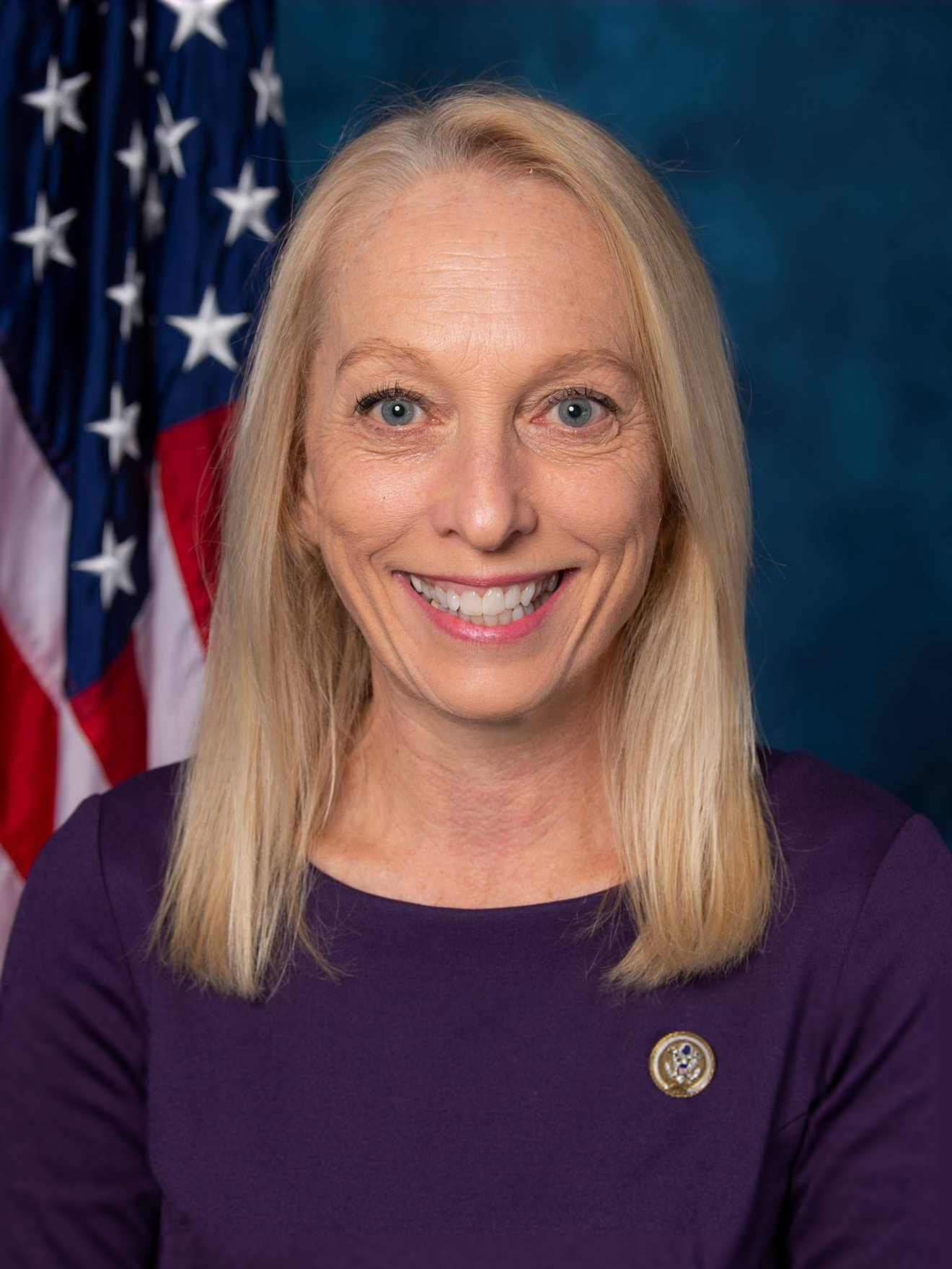
- Official portrait, 2018

Member of the U.S. House of Representatives from Pennsylvania
- Incumbent
- Assumed office November 13, 2018
- Preceded by: Pat Meehan
- Constituency: 7th district (2018–2019); 5th district (2019–present)

Personal details
- Born: August 30, 1959 (age 67) Syracuse, New York, U.S.
- Party: Democratic
- Spouse: Mark Stewart
- Children: 3
- Education: Colgate University (BA); University of Pennsylvania (JD)
- Website: House website Campaign website
- Scanlon's voice Scanlon supporting extended restaurant aid following the COVID-19 pandemic. Recorded April 6, 2022

Mary Gay Scanlon (born August 30, 1959) is an American attorney and politician. A member of the Democratic Party, she has represented Pennsylvania's 5th congressional district in the United States House of Representatives since 2019. The district is based in Delaware County, a mostly suburban county west of Philadelphia, and also includes a southwestern portion of Philadelphia itself as well as slivers of Chester and Montgomery counties. Scanlon spent the final two months of 2018 as the member for Pennsylvania's 7th congressional district. She was elected to both positions on November 6, 2018. That day, she ran in a special election in the old 7th to serve out the term of her predecessor, Pat Meehan, and in a regular election for a full two-year term in the new 5th. She was sworn in as the member for the 7th on November 13, 2018, and transferred to the 5th on January 3, 2019.

== Early life and education ==
Scanlon was born in Syracuse, New York. She is the daughter of Daniel Scanlon and Carol Florence Yehle, and has two sisters, Elizabeth Maura Scanlon and M. Kathleen Scanlon. Her father was an attorney and was appointed part-time US magistrate in 1971 and full-time US magistrate in 1993. Her mother, Carol Florence Yehle, was an English professor at Jefferson Community College in Watertown, New York. Her maternal grandfather, Leo J. Yehle, was a family-court judge who helped write the first juvenile justice code in New York in the 1960s.

Scanlon earned her Bachelor of Arts degree from Colgate University in 1980, and she received her Juris Doctor from the University of Pennsylvania Law School in 1984. Upon completing her education, she became a judicial law clerk for Judge J. Sydney Hoffman of the Superior Court of Pennsylvania.

== Legal career ==
In 1985, Scanlon represented a sexually abused 11-year-old girl in a dependency case. This experience made Scanlon decide to pursue a career in public interest law. In 1994, she received the Fidelity Award, the highest award for public service from the Philadelphia Bar Association.

Scanlon served as an attorney with the Education Law Center of Philadelphia, helping implement special education laws, before joining Ballard Spahr as pro bono counsel. There she helped coordinate the provision of free legal services to low-income recipients. She partnered with the Wills for Heroes Foundation, providing legal documents free of charge to first responders. She helped a young woman from Guinea who had sickle-cell disease obtain permanent residency.

In 2006, she was appointed vice chair of the Tax Commission. The following year, she joined the board of the Wallingford-Swarthmore School District and served as its president from 2009 to 2011. She continued as a member of the board until 2015.

== U.S. House of Representatives ==
=== Elections ===
==== 2018 general ====
On February 25, 2018, Scanlon launched her campaign for US Congress in Pennsylvania's 5th district in the 2018 election. The district had previously been the 7th, represented by four-term Republican Pat Meehan, who had announced a month earlier that he was not running for reelection. She kicked off the campaign by giving a speech at Swarthmore Rutledge School. The seat was one of several that had been significantly redrawn by the Pennsylvania Supreme Court, which ruled that the previous map had been an unconstitutional partisan Republican gerrymander. The redrawn 5th covers all of Delaware County, slivers of Montgomery and Chester counties, and the southwestern corner of Philadelphia, including the areas around the South Philadelphia Sports Complex and Philadelphia International Airport. Scanlon said that her interest in running was also piqued by the fact that Pennsylvania had no women in its congressional delegation. She was endorsed by former Pennsylvania governor Ed Rendell and the Philadelphia Inquirer.

On May 15, Scanlon won the 10-person primary with 16,831 votes, or a 28.4% share of the votes cast. Her closest competitor was former Assistant United States Attorney for United States District Court for the Eastern District of Pennsylvania Ashley Lunkenheimer, who received 9,060 votes or a 15.3% share. "Tonight we can revel in this moment," Scanlon said in her acceptance of the Democratic nomination. "You all here have once again rewritten history in Delaware County. Tonight, we made it possible for this new district for the first time to be represented by a Democrat in Congress and to be represented by a woman in Congress." The new 5th is more compact and Democratic than its predecessor. Had it existed in 2016, Hillary Clinton would have won it with 63% of the vote, which would have been her third-best performance in the state and her strongest outside of the Philadelphia-based districts. By comparison, Clinton won the old 7th with 49% of the vote.

==== 2018 special ====
Meehan resigned from the House on April 27, 2018, a month before the primary. Scanlon was named the Democratic candidate in a special election to succeed him. As a result, she ran in two elections on November 6, a special election for the balance of Meehan's fourth term in the old 7th and a regular election for a full two-year term in the new 5th. Her Republican opponent was prosecutor Pearl Kim.

2018 election results

On November 6, Scanlon defeated Kim in both the special and regular elections. The margin was much closer in the special election for the 7th district because it took place under the old district lines that had been thrown out by the state supreme court earlier in the year.

She was sworn into her 7th district seat on November 13, 2018, in a ceremony attended by Hawa Salih, a Sudanese human rights activist whom Scanlon helped gain asylum in the U.S. She was one of four Democratic women elected to Congress from Pennsylvania in 2018. The others were Madeleine Dean, Chrissy Houlahan and Susan Wild. The state's congressional delegation had previously been all male. She is only the third Democrat to represent this district and its predecessors since 1939.

==== 2020 ====
On November 3, 2020, Scanlon defeated Republican nominee Dasha Pruett with 64.7% of the vote (255,743 votes) to Pruett's 35.3% (139,552).

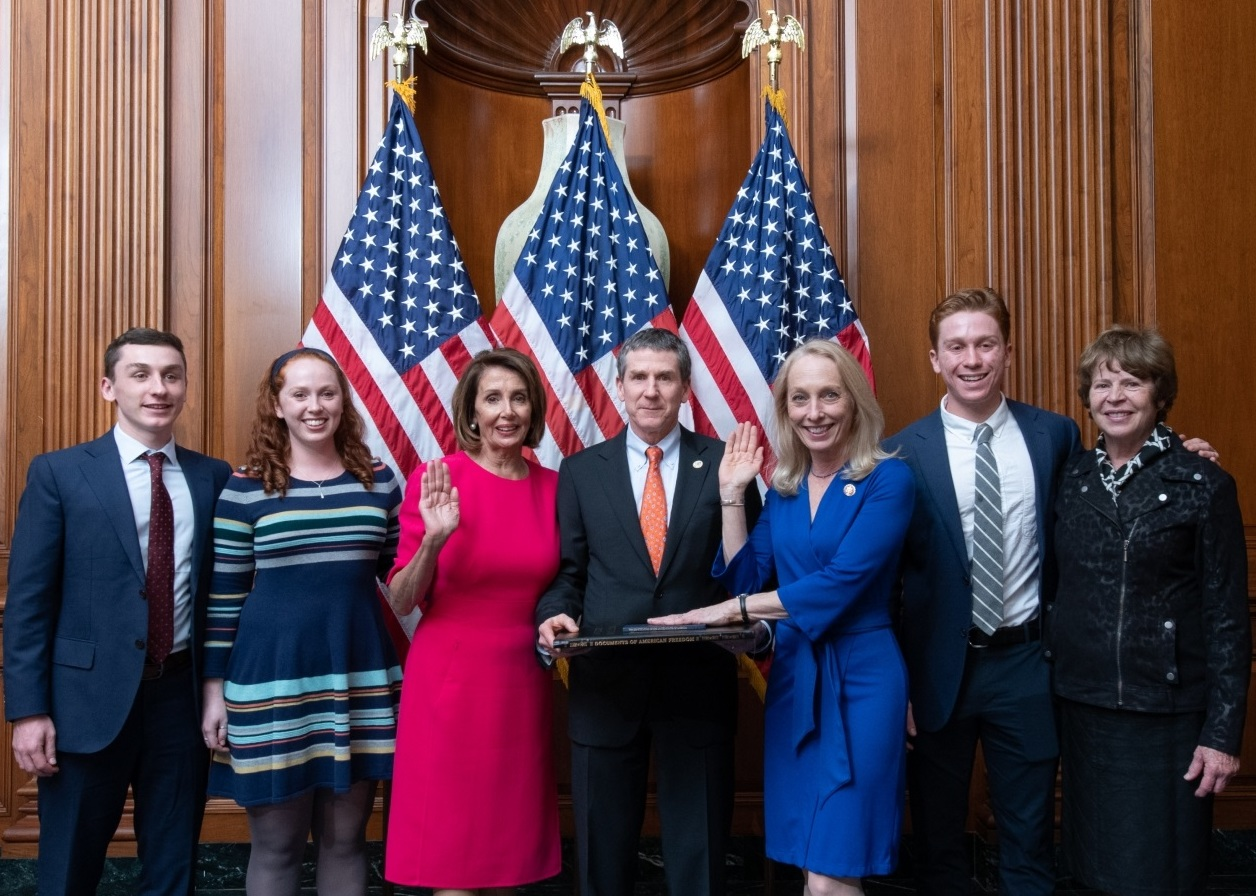
Scanlon with her family being sworn in by Speaker Nancy Pelosi

She transferred to the 5th district in January 2019, with two months' more seniority than the other freshmen elected in 2018.

=== Tenure ===
As of late 2024, Scanlon had sponsored 51 bills and co-sponsored 1,572 bills in Congress. In addition, she had sponsored 38 resolutions and co-sponsored 201 resolutions.

Bills that Scanlon sponsored fell in the following categories:

- Crime and Law Enforcement - 14
- Government Operations and Politics - 12
- Families - 4
- Law - 3
- Transportation and Public Works - 3
- Commerce - 2
- Education - 2
- Finance and Financial Sector - 2
- Health - 2
- Social Welfare - 2
- Armed Forces and National Security - 1
- Labor and Employment -1
- Taxation - 1

In the 118th Congress, Scanlon sponsored the following bills:

- H.R.10540 — To prohibit data brokers from selling and transferring certain sensitive data.
- H.R.10149 — Disability Voting Rights Act
- H.R.10032 — Dropbox Access Act
- H.R.9408 — Pedestrian Protection Act
- H.R.8555 — Help Grandfamilies Prevent Child Abuse Act
- H.R.8328 — Alternatives to Guardianship Education Act
- H.R.7389 — Accessible Voting Act of 2024
- H.R.6713 — Corporate Crime Database Act of 2023
- H.R.6312 — Inaugural Fund Integrity Act
- H.R.5449 — Stopping the Fraudulent Sales of Firearms Act
- H.R.5047 — Justice for Juveniles Act
- H.R.3443 — Foster Youth Mentoring Act of 2023

==== Foreign Policy ====
In 2023, Scanlon was among 50 Democrats to vote to remove American troops from Somalia by voting for H.Con.Res. 30. Scanlon was among 56 Democrats to vote in favor of H.Con.Res. 21 which directed President Joe Biden to remove U.S. troops from Syria within 180 days.

A member of the Irish-American community in Pennsylvania, Scanlon is a member of the Congressional Friends of Ireland Caucus and traveled with President Joe Biden to Ireland in 2023.

=== Committee assignments ===
- Committee on the Judiciary
  - Subcommittee on the Constitution and Limited Government (Ranking Member)
  - Subcommittee on Administrative State, Regulatory Reform, and Antitrust
- Committee on Rules
  - Subcommittee on Rules and Organization of the House (Ranking Member)

=== Caucus memberships ===
- Black Maternal Health Caucus
- Youth Mentoring Caucus (Chair)
- Congressional Caucus on Foster Youth (Co-Chair)
- Friends of Ireland Caucus
- Access to Legal Aid Caucus (Chair)
- Congressional Progressive Caucus
- Congressional Equality Caucus (Vice Chair)
- Congressional Ukraine Caucus
- Rare Disease Caucus
- New Democrat Coalition

== Electoral history ==
Democratic primary results, 2018 (regular)
Party	Candidate	Votes	%
Democratic	Mary Gay Scanlon	16,804	28.4
Democratic	Ashley Lunkenheimer	9,044	15.3
Democratic	Richard Lazer	8,892	15.0
Democratic	Molly Sheehan	6,099	10.3
Democratic	Greg Vitali	5,558	9.4
Democratic	Lindy Li	4,126	7.0
Democratic	Theresa Wright	3,046	5.2
Democratic	Thaddeus Kirkland	2,327	3.9
Democratic	Margo L. Davidson	2,275	3.9
Democratic	Larry Arata	913	1.5
Total votes		59,084	100.0

Pennsylvania's 5th congressional district, 2018 (regular)
Party	Candidate	Votes	%
Democratic	Mary Gay Scanlon	198,639	65.2
Republican	Pearl Kim	106,075	34.8
Total votes		304,714	100.0
Democratic gain from Republican			

Pennsylvania's 7th congressional district, 2018 (special)
Party	Candidate	Votes	%	±%
Democratic	Mary Gay Scanlon	173,268	52.27%	+11.47%
Republican	Pearl Kim	152,503	46.01%	−13.46%
Libertarian	Sandra Teresa Salas	3,177	0.96%	N/A
Green	Brianna Johnston	2,511	0.76%	N/A
Total votes		331,459	100.0%	N/A
Democratic gain from Republican				

Pennsylvania's 5th congressional district, 2020 (regular)
Party	Candidate	Votes	%
Democratic	Mary Gay Scanlon	255,743	64.7
Republican	Dasha Pruett	139,552	35.3
Total votes		395,295	100.0

Pennsylvania's 5th congressional district, 2022
Party	Candidate	Votes	%
Democratic	Mary Gay Scanlon	205,128	65.1
Republican	David Galluch	110,058	34.9
Total votes		315,186	100.0
Democratic hold			

Pennsylvania's 5th congressional district, 2024
Party	Candidate	Votes	%
Democratic	Mary Gay Scanlon	262,449	65.1
Republican	Alfeia Goodwin	140,725	34.9
Total votes		403,174	100.0
Democratic hold			

== Political positions ==
According to the Delaware County Daily Times, Scanlon's policy interests "include the need for fair elections; challenges to free speech; access to health care and public education; human rights for the victims of economic and political oppression; gun control; and threats to the environment." She is in favor of universal pre-K and supports marijuana decriminalization. In order to reduce the federal deficit, Scanlon wants to roll back Tax Cuts and Jobs Act. On the subject of a $15 minimum wage, she says she likes it "as a goal, but I do think we need to be careful and probably stage it." In 2025, after the U.S. Supreme Court denied to hear the case Ermold v. Davis, a case that sought to overturn Obergefell v. Hodges, which recognized the right of same-sex couples to marry nationwide in 2015, Scanlon, in response to the question "Did you hear the Supreme Court rejected Kim Davis's petition to overturn Obergefell?”, replied: "Yes, I did. Yes. That was the best news we've had out of the Supreme Court in quite a while."

== Personal life ==
Scanlon lives in Swarthmore with her husband, Mark Stewart. They have three adult children. Scanlon is Roman Catholic and can trace her ancestry back to Ballybunion in County Kerry, Ireland.

Scanlon was the victim of a carjacking on December 22, 2021, during which she was robbed at gunpoint. The crime took place in South Philadelphia, after Scanlon finished touring Franklin Delano Roosevelt Park that day. She was physically unharmed. The Delaware State Police and the Federal Bureau of Investigation recovered Scanlon's car later in the day in New Castle County, Delaware, near the Christiana Mall. Five people, who were inside the car when police found it, were taken into custody about six hours after the carjacking.

== See also ==
- Women in the United States House of Representatives
- List of American politicians of Irish descent

U.S. House of Representatives
Preceded by Pat Meehan	Member of the U.S. House of Representatives from Pennsylvania's 7th congressional district 2018–2019	Succeeded by Susan Wild
Preceded by Glenn Thompson	Member of the U.S. House of Representatives from Pennsylvania's 5th congressional district 2019–present	Incumbent
U.S. order of precedence (ceremonial)
Preceded by Joseph Morelle	United States representatives by seniority 186th	Succeeded by Steven Horsford
