= Jim McGovern (American politician) =

American politician (born 1959)

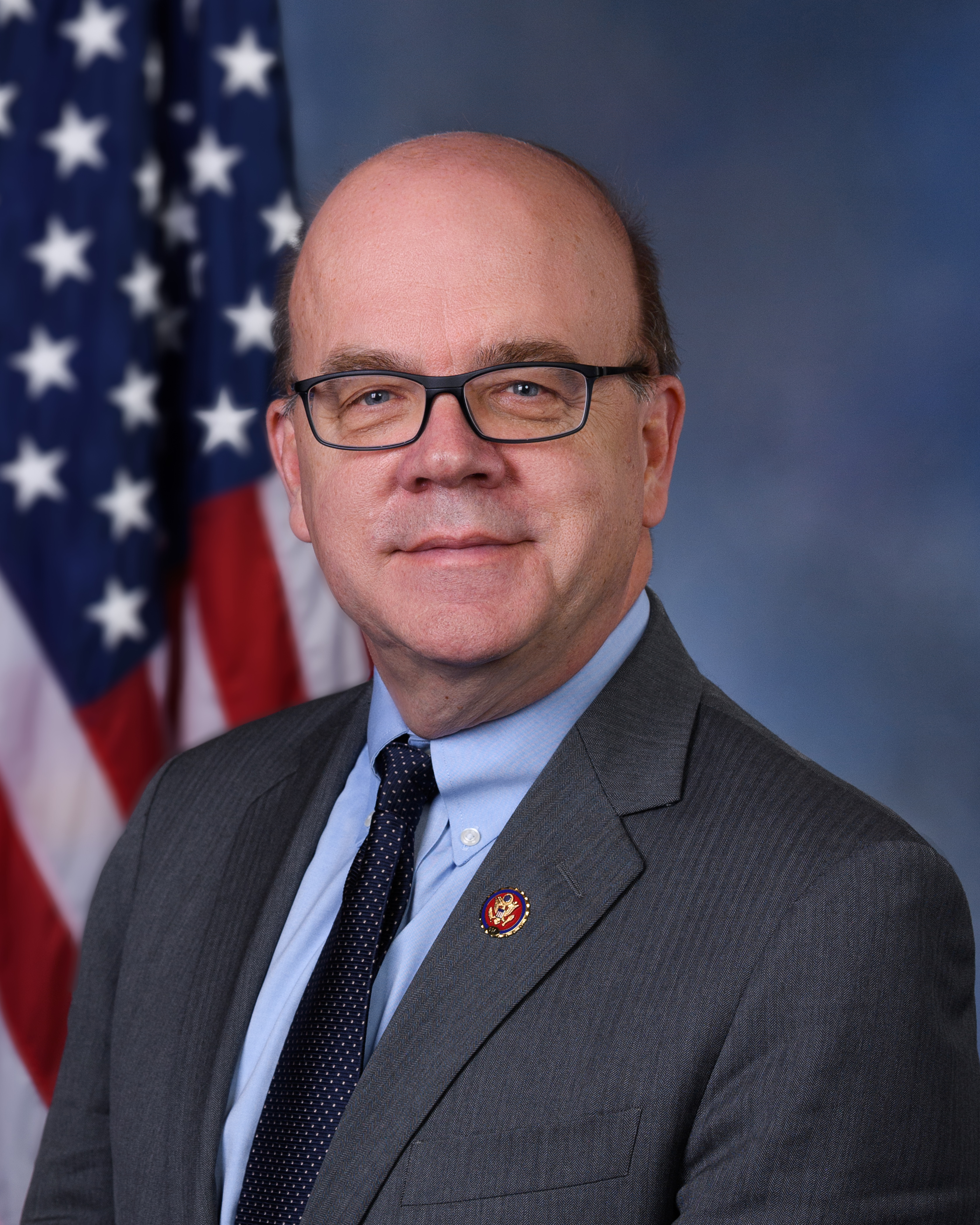
- Official portrait, 2019

Ranking Member of the House Rules Committee
- Incumbent
- Assumed office January 3, 2023
- Preceded by: Tom Cole
- In office March 16, 2018 – January 3, 2019
- Preceded by: Louise Slaughter
- Succeeded by: Tom Cole

Chair of the House Rules Committee
- In office January 3, 2019 – January 3, 2023
- Preceded by: Pete Sessions
- Succeeded by: Tom Cole

Member of the U.S. House of Representatives from Massachusetts
- Incumbent
- Assumed office January 3, 1997
- Preceded by: Peter Blute
- Constituency: 3rd district (1997–2013); 2nd district (2013–present)

Personal details
- Born: James Patrick McGovern; November 20, 1959 (age 66) Worcester, Massachusetts, U.S.
- Party: Democratic
- Spouse: Lisa Murray (m. 1989)
- Children: 2
- Education: American University (BA, MPA)
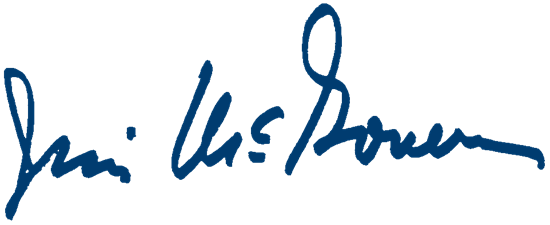
- Signature
- Website: House website Campaign website
- McGovern's voice McGovern on the state of global food security Recorded July 25, 2023

James Patrick McGovern (born November 20, 1959) is an American politician who has been a member of the United States House of Representatives since 1997, representing Massachusetts's 2nd congressional district since 2013. A Democrat, he is the ranking member of the House Rules Committee, chaired the Congressional-Executive Commission on China, and is the co-chair of the Tom Lantos Human Rights Commission. His district, numbered as the 3rd district from 1997 to 2013, stretches from Worcester to the Pioneer Valley.

Born and raised in Worcester, McGovern attended Worcester Academy. While in college he worked as a congressional intern and then as an aide to U.S. Senator George McGovern (no relation), a two-time presidential candidate for whom he campaigned. From 1981 to 1996 he was a senior staff member for U.S. Representative Joe Moakley. McGovern first ran for Congress in 1994, losing the Democratic primary. He ran again in 1996, defeating Republican incumbent Peter Blute.

As chairman of the board of the Congressional Hunger Center, McGovern is known as a leading voice on ending hunger and food insecurity both in the United States and globally. He was a key architect of the McGovern-Dole International Food for Education and Child Nutrition Program. For his work he has earned a 2016 James Beard Leadership Award from the James Beard Foundation and a 2008 McGovern-Dole Leadership Award from the World Food Program USA.

Another focus of McGovern's career has been international human rights, which he has advocated for in countries such as El Salvador, Sudan, Colombia, and the region of Tibet. He is a member of the Congressional Progressive Caucus and has been ranked as one of Congress's most liberal members.

== Early life, education, and early career ==
James Patrick McGovern was born in Worcester, Massachusetts, on November 20, 1959. He grew up in Worcester, where his mother, Mindy, was a dance instructor and his father, Walter, owned a liquor store. In junior high school, he first became involved in politics by campaigning for Democratic U.S. Senator George McGovern (to whom he is not related) in his unsuccessful 1972 presidential bid. After graduation from Worcester Academy, he moved to Washington, D.C., where from 1977 to 1980 he worked as an aide to George McGovern.

Jim McGovern attended American University, where he received a Bachelor of Arts degree in history in 1981 and a Master of Public Administration in 1984. He also served as director of the Kennedy Political Union, American University's student-run speakers bureau. George McGovern ran for president again in 1984 and Jim McGovern was the state coordinator of his Massachusetts campaign branch. He made the nominating speech for McGovern at the 1984 Democratic National Convention.

In 1981, Jim McGovern joined the Capitol Hill staff of U.S. Representative Joe Moakley. In 1990, Moakley appointed him to lead a House task force investigating the 1989 murder of six Jesuit priests and two women in El Salvador by the Atlácatl Battalion, working with Salvadoran activist Leonel Gómez Vides. He later advocated cutting off U.S. funding for the U.S. Army School of the Americas, where several of the military members had been trained.

== U.S. House of Representatives ==
=== Elections ===
McGovern first ran for Congress in 1994, entering a crowded Democratic primary to represent the area then defined as Massachusetts's 3rd district. The district, in central and southeastern Massachusetts, included parts of Bristol, Middlesex, Norfolk, and Worcester counties–essentially, the heart of the MetroWest region. During the campaign, McGovern said his record as "a Washington insider" would make him a more effective representative. Despite endorsements from Moakley, George McGovern, and presidential aide George Stephanopoulos, McGovern lost the primary to Massachusetts State Representative Kevin O'Sullivan, who then lost to Republican incumbent Peter Blute.

McGovern left Moakley's office in 1996 and moved back to Worcester, again running for Congress. This time, he won the nomination unopposed and faced Blute in the general election. His campaign slogan focused on unseating House Speaker Newt Gingrich: "To dump Newt you have to dump Blute." Blute was endorsed by The Boston Globe and five other local papers, but McGovern won the election with 53% of the vote. He has never faced another contest nearly that close, and has been reelected 13 times. He ran unopposed in 2000 and 2002.

In 2004, he was opposed by Republican Ronald A. Crews, an evangelical pastor, former Georgia state legislator, and president of the Massachusetts Family Institute. A national conservative activist, Crews challenged McGovern's positions on same-sex marriage and abortion. McGovern derided his opponent's focus on social issues, saying, "When Ron Crews gets up in the morning, the first thing he thinks about is gay marriage. I don't think that is the most important issue for most families. Jobs, health care, education, how to make the world a more peaceful place, those are the issues people care about." McGovern defeated Crews with 71% of the vote, and ran unopposed in 2006 and 2008.

In the 2010 election, McGovern faced Republican Marty Lamb, a real estate lawyer, and independent Patrick J. Barron, a Department of Mental Health administrator. He was reelected with 57% of the vote.

When Massachusetts lost a district in the 2010 census, McGovern's district was renumbered as the 2nd district and pushed west to Amherst and the Pioneer Valley. He ran unopposed in 2012, 2014, and 2016.

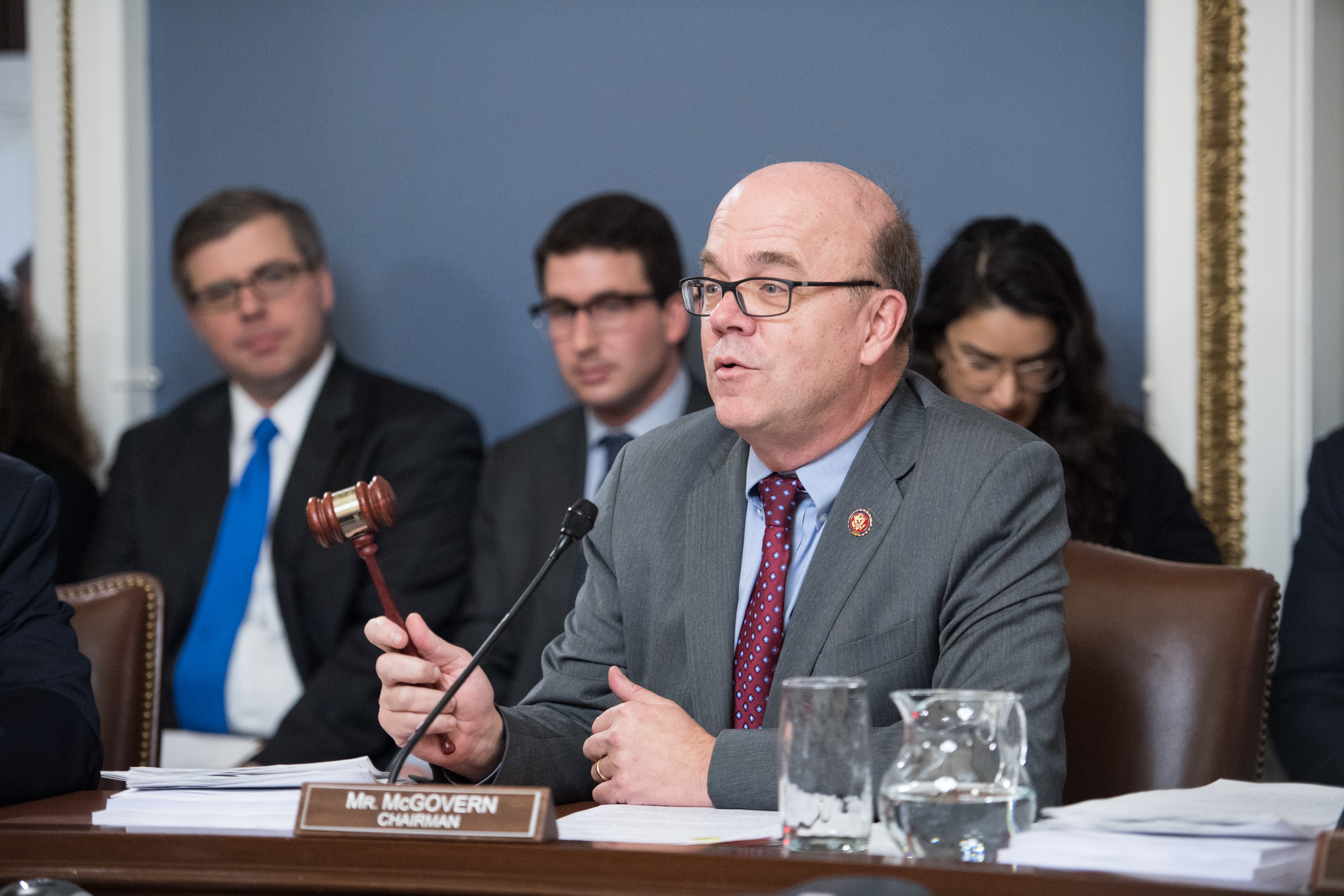
McGovern chairs a meeting of the Rules Committee during the 116th Congress in 2019.

=== Tenure ===
McGovern took over the top Democratic position on the House Rules Committee when Louise Slaughter died. After the 2018 midterm elections in which Democrats won the House majority, McGovern became chair.

Called the "Speaker's Committee" because it is the mechanism that the Speaker of the House uses to maintain order and control of the House Floor, the Rules Committee is often considered the most powerful committee in Congress. As chair, McGovern can influence the introduction and consideration of almost every piece of legislation that comes to a vote.

One of McGovern's first actions as chair was to pass a sweeping set of reforms to the House Rules. He wrote at the time that his changes were designed to "usher in a new era of clean government". McGovern also said the rules changes were "the result of unprecedented bipartisan outreach" and that he had met with "both Democrats and Republicans to seek their input on potential changes".

The National Journal reported that McGovern had used his Capitol Hill experience to help position himself as "a power broker in the Democratic caucus". In 2001, McGovern's mentor, Joe Moakley, at the time dying of cancer, asked Dick Gephardt to help McGovern attain a seat on the Rules Committee. He was given a commitment for the next available Democratic seat.

On the Rules Committee, McGovern has been able to use his experience with House procedures to his advantage. With Republicans comprising the majority of the panel, he "showed a sharp partisan edge as he embraced parliamentary maneuvers that led to cries of outrage" from Republican members.

==== Impeachments of Donald Trump ====
As chair, McGovern played a central role in devising procedures the House adopted for the first impeachment of Donald Trump. At the time, McGovern wrote in The Boston Globe that "[t]he House will ensure the public-facing phase of this inquiry is transparent and will stand the test of time." He later explained his decision to vote for impeachment by saying, "I often think about kids today getting involved in the political process just like I did back in 1972. What will they think if we say that the president’s actions don’t matter?"

He supported impeaching Trump again for inciting the January 6, 2021, U.S. Capitol attack.

==== Visit to Ukraine ====
On April 30, 2022, McGovern accompanied House Speaker Nancy Pelosi and three other U.S. representatives on a secret trip to Kyiv, Ukraine, and met with President Volodymyr Zelenskyy. The delegation pledged billions of dollars in military aid.

=== Domestic policy ===
==== Transportation ====
For his first three terms, McGovern served on the House Transportation Committee. He and Representative John Olver, who served on the House Appropriations Committee, coordinated to bring extensive transportation funding to their districts. When criticized for his heavy use of earmarks, McGovern responded, "It's not pork. It's nourishment."

==== Fiscal policy ====
McGovern supported economic stimulus efforts during the late-2000s recession, including the Economic Stimulus Act in February 2008 and the Emergency Economic Stabilization Act (which established the Troubled Asset Relief Program) in October 2008. He supported the Obama administration's 2009 stimulus package. Responding to Republican criticism of Democratic budgetary priorities, he chided the GOP for running up the national debt under George W. Bush, saying: "It is somewhat ironic that the very people who drove this economy into a ditch are now complaining about the size of the tow truck." He voted to instate the Statutory Pay-As-You-Go Act in February 2010.

McGovern was among the 46 Democrats who voted against final passage of the Fiscal Responsibility Act of 2023 in the House.

==== Education ====
The Higher Education Act of 1998 included an amendment by McGovern that doubled Pell Grant funding for two years for students who graduate in the top 10 percent of their class.

==== Food and agriculture ====
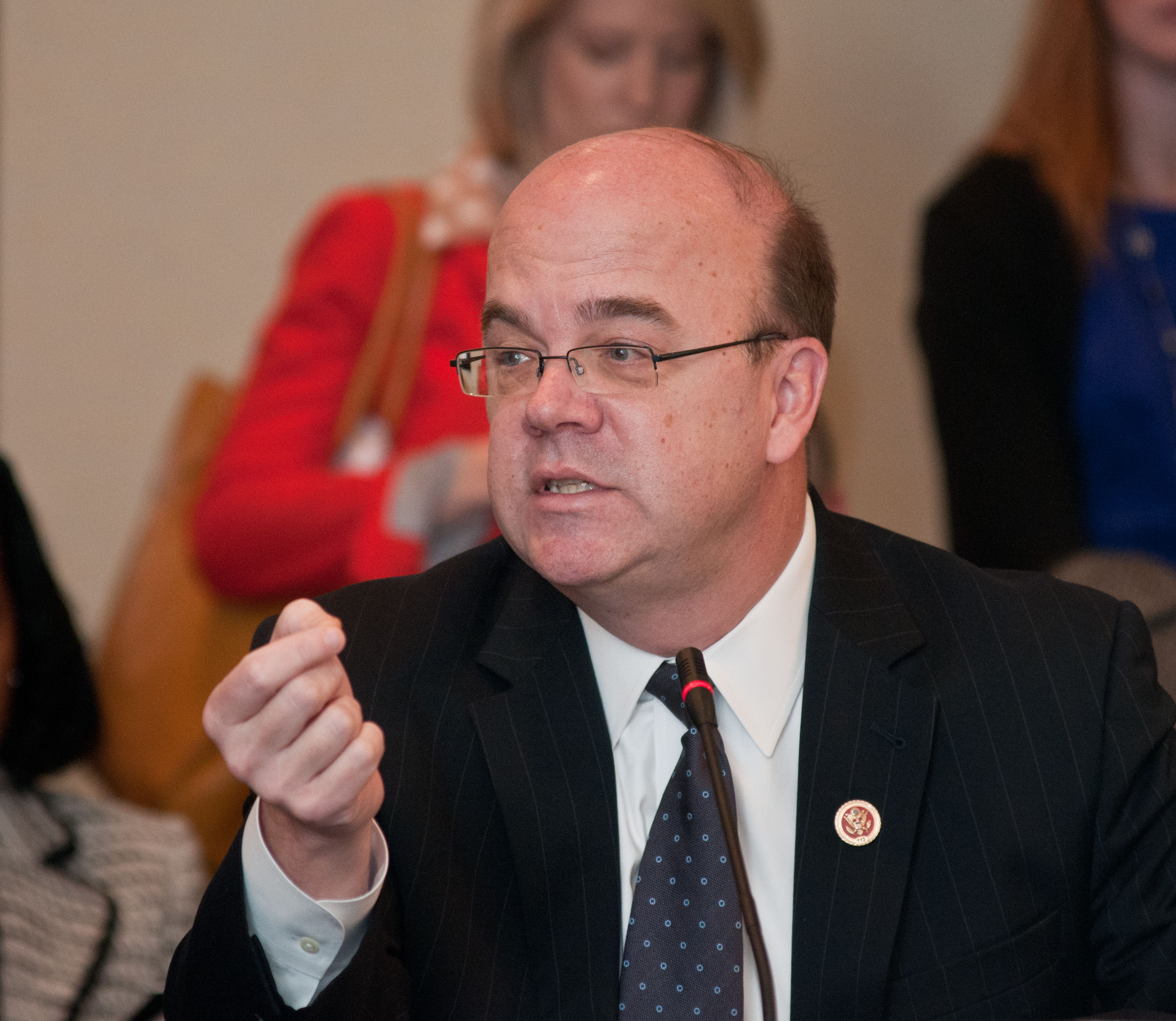
McGovern in 2013, addressing the Food Policy session of the United States Conference of Mayors in Washington D.C.

As co-chair of the House Hunger Caucus, McGovern is an advocate for expanding child nutrition programs both domestically and internationally. In 2007, he obtained $840 million in required funding for the McGovern-Dole International Food for Education and Child Nutrition Program in the House version of the farm bill. The House–Senate conference committee stripped most of the funding from the final bill.

As the co-chair of the Congressional Hunger Center, McGovern has pushed for changes to foreign aid and hunger relief programs. He proposed establishing a "hunger czar position" to take on food issues. McGovern also took part in the food stamp challenge, which entailed living on the average $21 in food stamps for a week.

McGovern supports federal funding for alternative proteins, including plant-based foods. In 2021, McGovern and Representative Julia Brownley led a letter by 46 members of Congress requesting $200 million in alternative proteins research funding for the USDA's Agricultural Research Service. In July 2023, McGovern authored the Peas, Legumes, and Nuts Today (PLANT) Act, which would have extended agricultural subsidies to producers of common plant-based proteins and established an agricultural marketing program for plant-based foods.

McGovern has expressed support for the California farm animal welfare law Proposition 12, which prohibits the sale of products from animals confined in battery cages, gestation crates, and veal crates. He criticized a July 2025 House Agriculture Committee hearing that he characterized as being dominated by opponents of the law, calling it a "misrepresentation of reality" and stating that many producers benefit from higher animal welfare standards.

==== Immigration ====
McGovern has voted against major efforts to restrict illegal immigration, including the REAL ID Act of 2005, the Border Protection, Anti-terrorism, and Illegal Immigration Control Act of 2005, and the Secure Fence Act of 2006.

==== Health care ====
McGovern believes health care is a human right. He voted for the Health Care and Education Reconciliation Act of 2010, ultimately pushing for a robust public option that was not included in the final measure. He supports Medicare for All.

==== Voting age ====
In January 2023, McGovern was one of 13 cosponsors of an amendment to the Constitution of the United States extending the right to vote to citizens 16 years of age or older.

==== Corporate personhood ====
In 2010, McGovern said he thought the Supreme Court decision Citizens United was wrongly decided, and that the First Amendment does not protect unlimited political advertising by corporations. He elaborated, saying that corporations should not "have the same equality as a regular voter". At first, he said that "the Constitution was wrong", but later said he had misspoken. On November 15, 2011, McGovern introduced the People's Rights Amendment, a proposal to limit the Constitution's protections to only natural persons, not corporations. In January 2012, McGovern promoted his participation in a panel discussion titled "Corporations are not people." On July 14, 2014, McGovern and Representative Ted Deutch introduced H.J. Res 119, which includes a section to address corporate personhood.

==== Social issues ====
McGovern has a pro-choice record on abortion. He voted against the Partial-Birth Abortion Ban Act in 2003 and the Unborn Victims of Violence Act in 2004. He supports stem cell research, voting for the Stem Cell Research Enhancement Act in 2005, 2007, and 2009. He voted for the Employment Non-Discrimination Act of 2007, which would have prevented employment discrimination on the basis of sexual orientation. He voted against the Federal Marriage Amendment, which would have constitutionally outlawed same-sex marriage, in 2004 and 2006, and co-sponsored the Respect for Marriage Act of 2009, which would allow the federal government to recognize same-sex marriages.

==== Objection to 2016 presidential election results ====
On January 6, 2017, McGovern objected to Alabama's electoral votes, which Donald Trump had won with 62.08% of the vote. Because no senator joined his objection, the objection was dismissed.

=== Foreign policy and human rights ===
==== China ====
On July 21, 2019, McGovern called attacks against Hong Kong's anti-extradition bill protesters "orchestrated violence against peaceful protesters" and urged Hong Kong authorities to protect the freedom of demonstration.

On October 27, 2022, McGovern and Senator Jeff Merkley urged U.S. financial executives to cancel their attendance at the Global Financial Leaders' Investment Summit, saying, "Their presence only serves to legitimize the swift dismantling of Hong Kong's autonomy, free press, and the rule of law by Hong Kong authorities acting along with the Chinese Communist Party."

On July 31, 2024, the Chinese Ministry of Foreign Affairs announced sanctions over McGovern, alleging his frequent interference in China's "internal affairs."

==== Iraq ====
McGovern has vocally opposed the Iraq War since its inception. He voted against the initial authorization of military force against Iraq in October 2002. In May 2007, McGovern introduced H.R. 2237, to "provide for the redeployment of United States Armed Forces and defense contractors from Iraq". The bill failed by a vote of 255 to 171.

==== Afghanistan ====
McGovern initially supported the War in Afghanistan, but became increasingly skeptical of it. In June 2010, he pushed a funding amendment to require President Barack Obama to make a draw-down plan before any further funding would be authorized. "Let us not waste, you know, more resources, more lives, on a policy that quite frankly is going to lead us nowhere", McGovern said. "We need to let Afghan President Hamid Karzai know that we're not a cheap date. We expect him to clean up his government."

==== Sudan ====
McGovern has been a prominent voice against the Islamist governments of Sudan for its prosecution of the war in Darfur. He has been arrested three times, twice during protests outside the Sudanese Embassy in Washington D.C. On April 28, 2006, he was one of five members of Congress arrested while protesting atrocities in Darfur, along with Sheila Jackson Lee, Jim Moran, John Olver, and Tom Lantos. McGovern was arrested again at the Sudanese embassy on April 27, 2009, this time accompanied by Representatives John Lewis, Donna Edwards, Lynn Woolsey, and Keith Ellison. He was arrested again on March 16, 2012, alongside George Clooney, during a protest outside the Sudanese embassy against the Bashir regime in Sudan.

In April 2007, he called for the U.S. and other countries to boycott the 2008 Olympic Games in Beijing to protest the Chinese government's support of the Sudanese government and, by extension, the genocide in Darfur.

==== Colombia ====
McGovern has traveled several times to Colombia to meet with human rights advocates, and has been very critical of Plan Colombia and US military aid to that country. On March 25, 2008, The Wall Street Journal published an unsigned editorial suggesting that McGovern supported the FARC rebels in Colombia. According to the Journal, an investigation of the computer hard drive of the recently killed Raúl Reyes, second-in-command of the FARC, had turned up material indicating "an ardent effort" by McGovern "to do business directly with the FARC." The article said that McGovern had been "working with an American go-between, who has been offering the rebels help in undermining Colombia's elected and popular government." In response, McGovern said that his concern was to help win the release of hostages held by the FARC, as requested by several of their families. He said he had no sympathy for the rebels.

On February 13, 2009, McGovern offered a resolution on the subject of the trial of the Iranian Baháʼí Faith leadership co-sponsored by seven others in H.Res. 175. The situation has gathered international attention, including defense of Nobel Laureate attorney Shirin Ebadi after she received threats warning her against making speeches abroad, and defending Iran's minority Baháʼí community.

==== Cuba ====
McGovern advocates normalizing diplomatic relations with Cuba. He accompanied President Barack Obama to Cuba in 2016. He said at the time that "Americans have long been ready for a 21st-century approach to Cuba and with our two nations working together, we can create new opportunities for American businesses, increase travel and exchange, and support efforts in Cuba to advance democratic reforms and promote human rights.” He also joined Secretary of State John Kerry on a 2019 trip to reopen the U.S. embassy in Havana.

In 2000, McGovern met with the Cuban grandmothers of five-year-old Elian Gonzalez. Elian's mother had drowned while trying to escape from Cuba with the boy. Although Elian reached Florida safely, McGovern advocated for his return to his father's custody in Cuba.

In 2002 McGovern joined the Congressional Cuba Working Group, which advocated for lowering restrictions on travel and food shipment to Cuba. He is the current co-chair of the Tom Lantos Human Rights Commission (formerly the "Human Rights Caucus"). His work on human rights issues earned him the Washington Office on Latin America's "Human Rights Award" in 2007.

==== Myanmar ====
On November 18, 2013, McGovern introduced House Resolution 418. The resolution calls on the government of Myanmar to end the persecution and discrimination of the Rohingya people within its borders and calls on the U.S. government and the international community to pressure the Burmese to do so. The resolution was in response to allegations of Burmese Buddhist attacks on Rohingya Muslims earlier in 2014. McGovern argued that "the Burmese government needs to recognize the Rohingya as an ethnic group. The situation is dire and rapidly deteriorating."

==== Syria ====
In 2023, McGovern was among 56 Democrats to vote in favor of H.Con.Res. 21, which directed President Joe Biden to remove U.S. troops from Syria within 180 days.

==== Ukraine ====
In 2023, McGovern was among 49 Democrats to break with President Joe Biden, by voting for a ban on cluster munitions to Ukraine.

=== Israel and Palestine ===
McGovern has advocated for Palestinian self-determination and a negotiated two-state solution to the Israeli–Palestinian conflict. Although he has described himself as a friend of Israel and acknowledged Israel's right to defend itself, he has frequently criticized Israeli government policies toward Palestinians, including military operations in the Gaza Strip, settlement expansion in the West Bank, and restrictions on humanitarian assistance. His positions have included calls to suspend American weapons transfers to Israel, opposition to additional military assistance, and accusations that Israeli military operations in Gaza constitute genocide.

==== Earlier positions and relations with pro-Israel constituents ====
During the 2008–2009 Gaza War, McGovern acknowledged Israel's right to defend itself against Hamas rocket attacks while raising concerns about potential violations of international humanitarian law. In January 2009, he supported a congressional resolution concerning the conflict but criticized its failure to adequately address humanitarian conditions in Gaza and the need for a ceasefire.

In 2021, McGovern criticized the Israeli government's designation of six Palestinian civil society organizations as terrorist organizations and urged Secretary of State Antony Blinken to publicly oppose the decision. McGovern subsequently described receiving hostile responses from pro-Israel advocates over his position.

==== Gaza war and opposition to military assistance ====
Following the October 7, 2023, Hamas-led attacks on Israel, McGovern condemned the attacks as terrorism. He subsequently joined congressional efforts calling for the release of Israeli hostages, protection of Palestinian civilians, expanded humanitarian assistance, and adherence to international humanitarian law in Israel's military response.

By April 2024, McGovern had called for a suspension of American military assistance to Israel. Speaking at an event in Worcester, Massachusetts, he argued that United States law required military assistance to be withheld from governments obstructing the delivery of humanitarian aid. He urged President Joe Biden to freeze assistance to Israel and called for a ceasefire, the release of hostages, and a two-state solution.

On April 20, 2024, McGovern voted against legislation providing additional military assistance to Israel. In explaining his vote, he criticized Prime Minister Benjamin Netanyahu's military campaign in Gaza, describing the Israeli response to the October 7 attacks as indiscriminate. McGovern accused Netanyahu of disregarding Palestinian civilian lives and restricting humanitarian relief. Although he reiterated that Israel had the right to defend its population, he opposed providing additional unconditional offensive military assistance.

==== Accusations of genocide ====
In September 2025, McGovern publicly accused Israel of committing genocide against Palestinians in Gaza. In a September 18 statement, he declared, "What is happening in Gaza is genocide." Citing findings by international human rights organizations and a United Nations Commission of Inquiry, he argued that Israeli actions met the legal threshold for genocide under the Genocide Convention. McGovern also accused the Israeli government of using starvation as a policy in Gaza and called for the United States to stop supplying weapons and financing military operations that he described as constituting genocide. He additionally called for a ceasefire, humanitarian access, the release of hostages, and a diplomatic settlement providing security and self-determination for both Israelis and Palestinians.

On November 13, 2025, McGovern joined Representative Rashida Tlaib and other Democratic lawmakers as an original cosponsor of H.Res. 876, titled "Recognizing the Genocide of the Palestinian People in Gaza." The resolution called for the United States to officially recognize that Israel had committed genocide against Palestinians in Gaza. It also urged the federal government to fulfill its obligations under the Genocide Convention, including by restricting weapons transfers potentially connected to prohibited acts, supporting accountability mechanisms, and considering sanctions. The resolution was referred to the House Committee on Foreign Affairs.

==== Vote to eliminate U.S. military assistance to Israel ====
On July 15, 2026, McGovern voted in favor of an amendment introduced by Republican Representative Thomas Massie that would have eliminated $3.3 billion in annual American military assistance to Israel from a State Department appropriations bill. The amendment failed by a vote of 104–314, with ten members voting present. McGovern was among 103 Democrats who supported the proposal, reflecting a division within the Democratic Party over continued military assistance to Israel.

McGovern also led a joint statement signed by 27 members of Congress supporting the amendment. The statement opposed American funding for Israeli military operations in Gaza and Lebanon, citing civilian casualties, destruction of civilian infrastructure, and humanitarian conditions. It also accused Israeli authorities of decades of human rights violations against Palestinians, including restrictions on freedom of movement, arbitrary detention, torture, and extrajudicial killings.

The lawmakers argued that existing American restrictions on security assistance had not been adequately enforced. They nevertheless distinguished their opposition to military funding from support for diplomatic initiatives and programs promoting Israeli–Palestinian cooperation, including the Nita M. Lowey Middle East Partnership for Peace Act.

After the drone strikes on aid workers from World Central Kitchen in April 2024, Mark Pocan, Jim McGovern, Jan Schakowsky, Nancy Pelosi and 36 more members of Congress from the Democratic party urged U.S. President Joe Biden in an open letter to reconsider planned arms shipments to the Israeli military.

==== Other work ====
On April 25, 2018, 57 House members, including McGovern, released a condemnation of Holocaust distortion in Ukraine and Poland. They criticized Poland's new Holocaust law and Ukraine's 2015 memory laws glorifying Ukrainian Insurgent Army (UPA) and its leaders, such as Roman Shukhevych.

On July 21, 2026 he spoke on the floor of the House of Representatives in order to address "affordability", which led to his discussion of changes in the Republican Party, current government policies, and the characteristics of fascism. The speech was featured the next day by historian Heather Cox Richardson in her daily publication on Substack, and during an interview of McGovern on August 5, 2026 that Richardson published separately online.

=== Committee assignments ===
- Committee on Rules (Ranking Member)
  - Subcommittee on Rules and the Organization of the House
- Committee on Agriculture
  - Subcommittee on Nutrition, Foreign Agriculture, and Horticulture

=== Caucus memberships ===
- Black Maternal Health Caucus
- House Baltic Caucus
- Congressional Arts Caucus
- Congressional Equality Caucus
- Afterschool Caucuses
- Congressional NextGen 9-1-1 Caucus
- Veterinary Medicine Caucus
- Congressional Progressive Caucus
- Congressional Caucus for the Equal Rights Amendment
- Medicare for All Caucus
- Rare Disease Caucus
- Congressional Taiwan Caucus

== Political positions ==
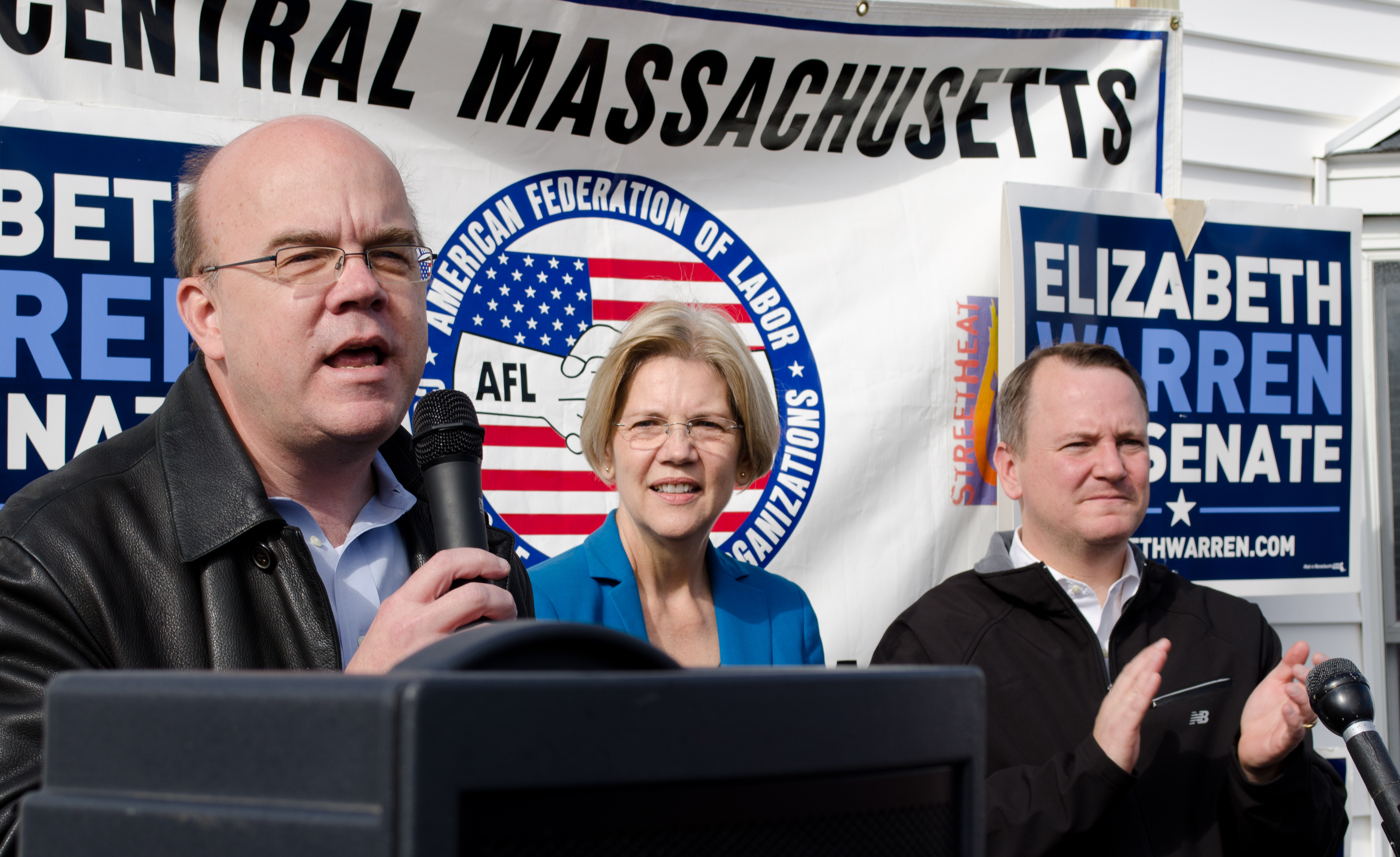
(l–r) McGovern campaigning in 2012 on behalf of U.S. Senate candidate Elizabeth Warren, alongside Lieutenant Governor Tim Murray at an Auburn rally

McGovern has aligned himself with liberal and progressive causes. "It's no secret that I'm a liberal", he said in 2010. "I didn't poll any of this stuff, but I am who I am." Political interest groups generally rank McGovern as one of the most liberal members of Congress. The National Journal ranked him among the seven most liberal representatives in the 110th Congress and GovTrack ranked him as the 33rd most politically left in the 117th Congress. The Washington Post noted numerous similarities between McGovern and his mentor, 1972 Democratic presidential nominee George McGovern (no relation): "Both are considered among the most liberal and anti-war lawmakers of their generation. The most prominent difference? They aren't related."

From 1997 to 2007, the liberal advocacy group Americans for Democratic Action gave him an average vote rating of 98.5%, whereas its conservative counterpart, the American Conservative Union, gave him an average vote rating of 2.5%. The United States Chamber of Commerce, which advocates for business-oriented policies, gave McGovern a 33% lifetime rating as of 2011.

== Family and personal life ==
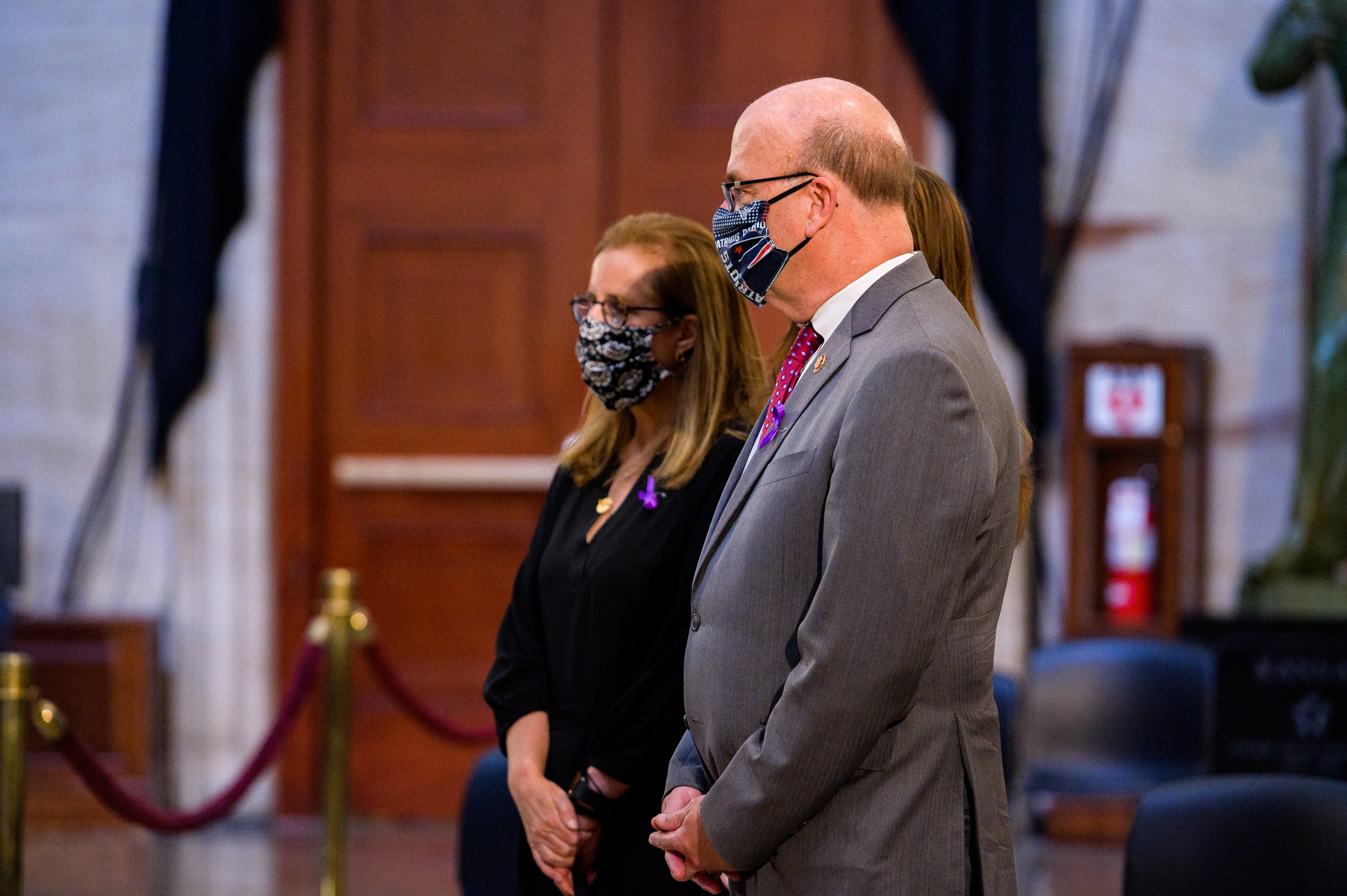
McGovern and wife Lisa Murray McGovern in 2020 attend the lying in state of Georgia Congressman John Lewis.

McGovern lives in Worcester with his wife, Lisa Murray McGovern, a former aide to U.S. Representative Gerry Studds. They have a son, Patrick, and a daughter, Molly. He has two sisters, who are teachers in the Worcester public school system. McGovern announced in April 2025 that his daughter Molly, who had been battling cancer, had died unexpectedly while in Italy.

In November 2010, McGovern underwent surgery to remove his thyroid gland after being diagnosed with papillary thyroid cancer, from which he has recovered.

McGovern is Roman Catholic and says that his legislative initiatives such as increased spending on global nutrition and raising taxes on higher income earners originate from the Catholic Church's efforts to serve the poor. He has also said that he draws inspiration from Jesuit values, and in particular from his work as a congressional staffer to investigate the 1989 murders of Jesuits in El Salvador. McGovern told America magazine in 2019, "I realized that if you commit yourself to a certain set of values, a life of service, if you are committed to lifting up the poor and standing with the poor, there's something about that that can be very satisfying. It makes you feel like you're living a life that's worthwhile."

== Publications ==
=== Articles ===
- McGovern, Jim (March 21, 2024). "Opinion: Banning TikTok is a terrible idea". BostonGlobe.com.
- McGovern, Jim (April 28, 2020). "Opinion: I'm chairman of the House Rules Committee. We need to change the way Congress operates". The Washington Post.

== Electoral history ==
	Democratic candidate			Republican candidate			Other candidate			
Year	Candidate	Votes		Candidate	Votes		Candidate	Party	Votes	
1996	Jim McGovern	135,047	52.9%	Peter Blute (Incumbent)	115,695	45.4%	Dale E. Friedgen	Natural Law	3,363	1.3%
1998	Jim McGovern (Incumbent)	108,613	56.9%	Matthew J. Amorello	79,174	41.5%	George Phillies	Libertarian	2,887	1.1%
2000	Jim McGovern (Incumbent)	213,065	98.8%	None			None			
2002	Jim McGovern (Incumbent)	155,697	98.8%	None			None			
2004	Jim McGovern (Incumbent)	192,036	70.5%	Ronald A. Crews	80,197	29.4%	None			
2006	Jim McGovern (Incumbent)	166,973	98.8%	None			None			
2008	Jim McGovern (Incumbent)	227,619	98.5%	None			None			
2010	Jim McGovern (Incumbent)	122,357	56.5%	Marty Lamb	85,124	39.2%	Patrick Barron	Independent	9,388	4.3%
2012	Jim McGovern (Incumbent)	259,257	98.5%	None			None			
2014	Jim McGovern (Incumbent)	169,140	98.2%	None			None			
2016	Jim McGovern (Incumbent)	275,487	98.2%	None			None			
2018	Jim McGovern (incumbent)	190,129	67.2%	Tracy Lovvorn	92,974	32.8%	None			
2020	Jim McGovern (incumbent)	249,854	65.3%	Tracy Lovvorn	132,220	34.6%	None			
2022	Jim McGovern (incumbent)	180,639	66.2%	Jeffrey Sossa-Paquette	91,956	33.7%	None			
2024	Jim McGovern (incumbent)	251,441	68.6%	Cornelius Shea	114,065	31.1%	None			

U.S. House of Representatives
Preceded by Peter Blute	Member of the U.S. House of Representatives from Massachusetts's 3rd congressional district 1997–2013	Succeeded by Niki Tsongas
Preceded by Tom Lantos	Chair of the House Human Rights Commission; 2008–2011	Succeeded by Frank Wolf
Preceded by Richard Neal	Member of the U.S. House of Representatives from Massachusetts's 2nd congressional district 2013–present	Incumbent
Preceded by Pete Sessions	Chair of the House Rules Committee; 2019–2023	Succeeded by Tom Cole
Preceded by Marco Rubio	Chair of the Joint China Commission; 2019–2021	Succeeded by Jeff Merkley
Preceded by Randy Hultgren	Chair of the House Human Rights Commission; 2019–2023	Succeeded by Chris Smith
U.S. order of precedence (ceremonial)
Preceded by Diana DeGette	United States representatives by seniority 23rd	Succeeded by Brad Sherman
Preceded by Zoe Lofgren	Order of precedence of the United States	Succeeded by Danny Davis
