= Rob Woodall =

American politician (born 1970)

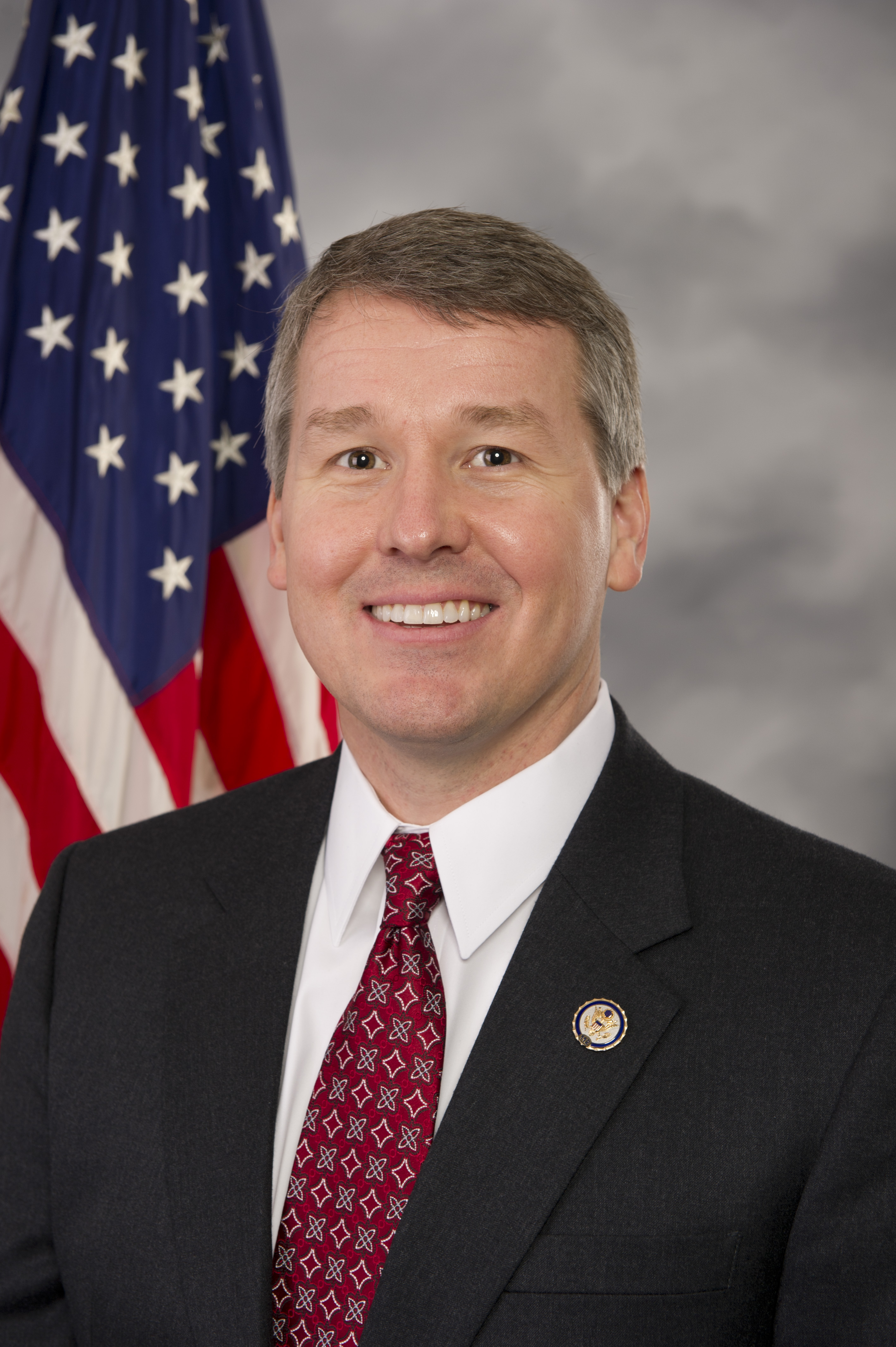

Chair of the Republican Study Committee
- In office August 1, 2014 – January 3, 2015
- Preceded by: Steve Scalise
- Succeeded by: Bill Flores

Member of the U.S. House of Representatives from Georgia's 7th district
- In office January 3, 2011 – January 3, 2021
- Preceded by: John Linder
- Succeeded by: Carolyn Bourdeaux

Personal details
- Born: William Robert Woodall III; February 11, 1970 (age 56) Athens, Georgia, U.S.
- Party: Republican
- Education: Furman University (BA); University of Georgia (JD)

William Robert Woodall III (/ˈwʊdɔːl/ WUUD-awl; born February 11, 1970) is an American attorney and politician who was the U.S. representative for Georgia's 7th congressional district from 2011 to 2021. The district included most of Gwinnett County, a suburban county northeast of Atlanta. A Republican, Woodall prior to being elected to Congress, worked for his predecessor, John Linder from 1994 to 2010, eventually becoming Linder's chief of staff.

== Early life, education, and career ==
Woodall was born in Athens, Georgia. He attended both public and private grade schools, graduating from Marist School in 1988. He received a B.A. from Furman University followed by law school at the University of Georgia School of Law. While attending law school, he spent summers working in a Washington, D.C. law firm. He left law school after the summer of 1994 to work for his hometown U.S. Representative, John Linder, where he began working as a legislative correspondent and eventually served as Linder's chief of staff in 2000. Woodall received his J.D. degree from the University of Georgia School of Law in 1998. Woodall is a member of the Methodist Church.

== U.S. House of Representatives ==
2010 election

Woodall won the Republican primary with about 56% of the vote against Jody Hice. He faced Democrat Doug Heckman in the 2010 General Election. On November 2, 2010, Woodall defeated Heckman to win the general election.

The top donors to Woodall's campaign were the Credit Union National Association, the Southern Company, the American Dental Association, and the Vision for Tomorrow Fund.

Woodall addressed the U.S. House on October 26, 2011, calling for reduced regulations on businesses.

2012 election

In 2012, Woodall won the election with 62.16% of the 252,066 votes cast, against Steve Reilly (D).

2014 election

In 2014, Woodall won the election with 65.39% of the 173,669 votes cast, against Thomas D. Wight (D).

2016 election

In 2016, Woodall won the election with 60.38% of the 288,301 votes cast, against Rashid Malik (D).

2018 election

In 2018, Woodall faced Democratic challenger Carolyn Bourdeaux. Woodall was supported by the Great America Committee, a political action committee registered by Vice President Mike Pence. The race proved to be unexpectedly competitive, and Woodall defeated Bourdeaux by only 433 votes after a recount. The race was the closest of the 2018 House elections. It was the closest that a Democrat has come to winning this district since its creation in 1993 (it was numbered as the 4th District from 1993 to 1997, the 11th from 1997 to 2003, and has been the 7th since 2003).

=== Tenure ===
Woodall took office as part of the 112th United States Congress in January 2011. In July 2014, Woodall was elected chairman of the Republican Study Committee, a group of conservative Republican lawmakers, succeeding Steve Scalise. Woodall was replaced as chairman in November 2014 by Bill Flores (TX-17).

Woodall announced in February 2019 that he would not seek reelection to a sixth term in Congress.

=== Committee assignments ===
- House Rules Committee
- House Budget Committee
- House Transportation & Infrastructure Committee

== Political positions ==
=== Economic issues ===
Woodall supported tax reform and FairTax.

He voted in favor of the Tax Cuts and Jobs Act of 2017. After the passage of the bill, Woodall stated that it "marks tremendous progress and is the fulfillment of a commitment made to the American people."

Woodall was one of only six House Republicans in the 112th Congress who did not sign Grover Norquist's "Taxpayer Protection Pledge," stating that "my commitment to the Fair Tax and a common-sense tax overhaul makes it impossible for me to support the second component of the Pledge, which states that I must 'oppose any net reduction or elimination of deductions and credits, unless matched dollar for dollar by further reducing tax rates.'"

=== Health care ===
Woodall opposed the Affordable Care Act, voting to repeal it.

Woodall co-sponsored the Sanctity of Human Life Act.

=== LGBT rights ===
Upon the legalization of same-sex marriage in the U.S., Woodall disagreed with the Supreme Court's approach to deciding the issue for the entire nation, rather than allowing states to make the decision individually.

=== Gun rights ===
Woodall was one of only six Republicans who opposed legislation that would require all states to honor the concealed weapons permits of other states, arguing that the bill was unnecessary because the Second Amendment to the United States Constitution already gives Americans the right to bear arms.

=== Mueller investigation ===
Woodall stated in June 2019 that he had not read the Mueller report about Russian interference in the 2016 presidential election.

== Electoral history ==
Georgia's 7th Congressional District Election (2010)
| Party | Candidate | Votes | % |
|---|---|---|---|
| Republican | Rob Woodall | 160,898 | 67.07 |
| Democratic | Doug Heckman | 78,996 | 32.93 |
| Total votes | | 239,894 | 100.00 |
| Turnout | | | |
| Republican hold | | | |

Georgia's 7th Congressional District Election (2012)
| Party | Candidate | Votes | % |
|---|---|---|---|
| Republican | Rob Woodall (incumbent) | 156,689 | 62.16 |
| Democratic | Steve Riley | 95,377 | 37.84 |
| Total votes | | 252,066 | 100.00 |
| Turnout | | | |
| Republican hold | | | |

Georgia's 7th Congressional District Election (2014)
| Party | Candidate | Votes | % |
|---|---|---|---|
| Republican | Rob Woodall (incumbent) | 113,557 | 65.39 |
| Democratic | Thomas Wight | 60,112 | 34.61 |
| Total votes | | 173,669 | 100.00 |
| Turnout | | | |
| Republican hold | | | |

Georgia's 7th Congressional District Election (2016)
| Party | Candidate | Votes | % |
|---|---|---|---|
| Republican | Rob Woodall (incumbent) | 174,081 | 60.38 |
| Democratic | Rashid Malik | 114,220 | 39.62 |
| Total votes | | 288,301 | 100.00 |
| Turnout | | | |
| Republican hold | | | |

Georgia's 7th congressional district, 2018
| Party | Candidate | Votes | % |
|---|---|---|---|
| Republican | Rob Woodall (incumbent) | 140,430 | 50.08 |
| Democratic | Carolyn Bourdeaux | 140,011 | 49.92 |
| Total votes | | 280,441 | 100.0 |
| Republican hold | | | |

U.S. House of Representatives
| Preceded by John Linder | Member of the U.S. House of Representatives from Georgia's 7th congressional district 2011–2021 | Succeeded by Carolyn Bourdeaux |
Party political offices
| Preceded by Steve Scalise | Chair of the Republican Study Committee; 2014–2015 | Succeeded by Bill Flores |
U.S. order of precedence (ceremonial)
| Preceded by Tom Graves as Former U.S. Representative | Order of precedence of the United States as Former U.S. Representative | Succeeded by Michael J. Harrington as Former U.S. Representative |
