= Shub (surname) =

Shub is an Ashkenazi Jewish occupational surname derived from the Hebrew acronym for shoḥeṭ ubodeq, "ritual slaughterer and examiner", cf. "Shohet" and "Schechter". Notable people with the surname include:

- Anatole Shub, American author and journalist
- David Shub (1887–1973) Russian and American social democrat activist, journalist and historian
- Elizabeth Shub, American children's book writer, editor, and translator from German and Yiddish
- Ellen Shub, American photojournalist
- Esfir Shub, Soviet filmmaker
- Michael Shub, American mathematician
- Peter Shub, American actor

== See also ==
- DJ Shub, Mohawk DJ and music producer
- Schub
- Schub.
