= Caring Across Generations =

American caregiving advocacy coalition

Caring Across Generations (CAG) is an American national coalition of caregivers and care recipients, with a mission "to change our culture and policy in America to value and support caregiving". CAG was founded in 2011 by Sarita Gupta and Ai-jen Poo to address the rapidly rising number of Americans in long-term care and the shortage of home care workers. One of CAG's original goals is to help create two million quality caregiving jobs in the United States.

== Origins ==
Poo was working on care issues after the 2008 financial crisis. According to her, in the midst of a "job crisis [and] a care crisis", she and other organizers decided to start a project to create two million quality jobs in homecare, for the benefit of care workers and care recipients.

== Activities ==
CAG advocates for government assistance for the estimated 53 million unpaid caregivers in the US, such as family members, who provide an estimated $600 billion of unpaid care annually. According to CAG, the financial and other costs of long-term care that families face is "beyond a crisis point ... It's been a rolling crisis and we're at a catastrophic point."

From 2018 to 2020, CAG participate in Lead Local, a research project supported by the Robert Wood Johnson Foundation, examining community power and community power-building in health care. The unusual research approach teamed CAG and three other non-academic organizations, Change Elemental, Human Impact Partners, and Right to the City Alliance, with university academics from the Johns Hopkins University SNF Agora Institute, the University of Southern California (USC) Equity Research Institute, and Vanderbilt University. Each party brought its own theories of community power-building and collaborated on research design and case study selection.

The CAG-led Care Can't Wait coalition of social justice and labor organizations, founded in 2020, seeks to build a robust federal care infrastructure. Labor unions involved include the Service Employees International Union (SEIU), the American Federation of Teachers (AFT), the American Federation of State County and Municipal Employees (AFSCME) and the American Federation of Labor and Congress of Industrial Organizations (AFL-CIO).
