= Jamie Raskin =

American politician (born 1962)

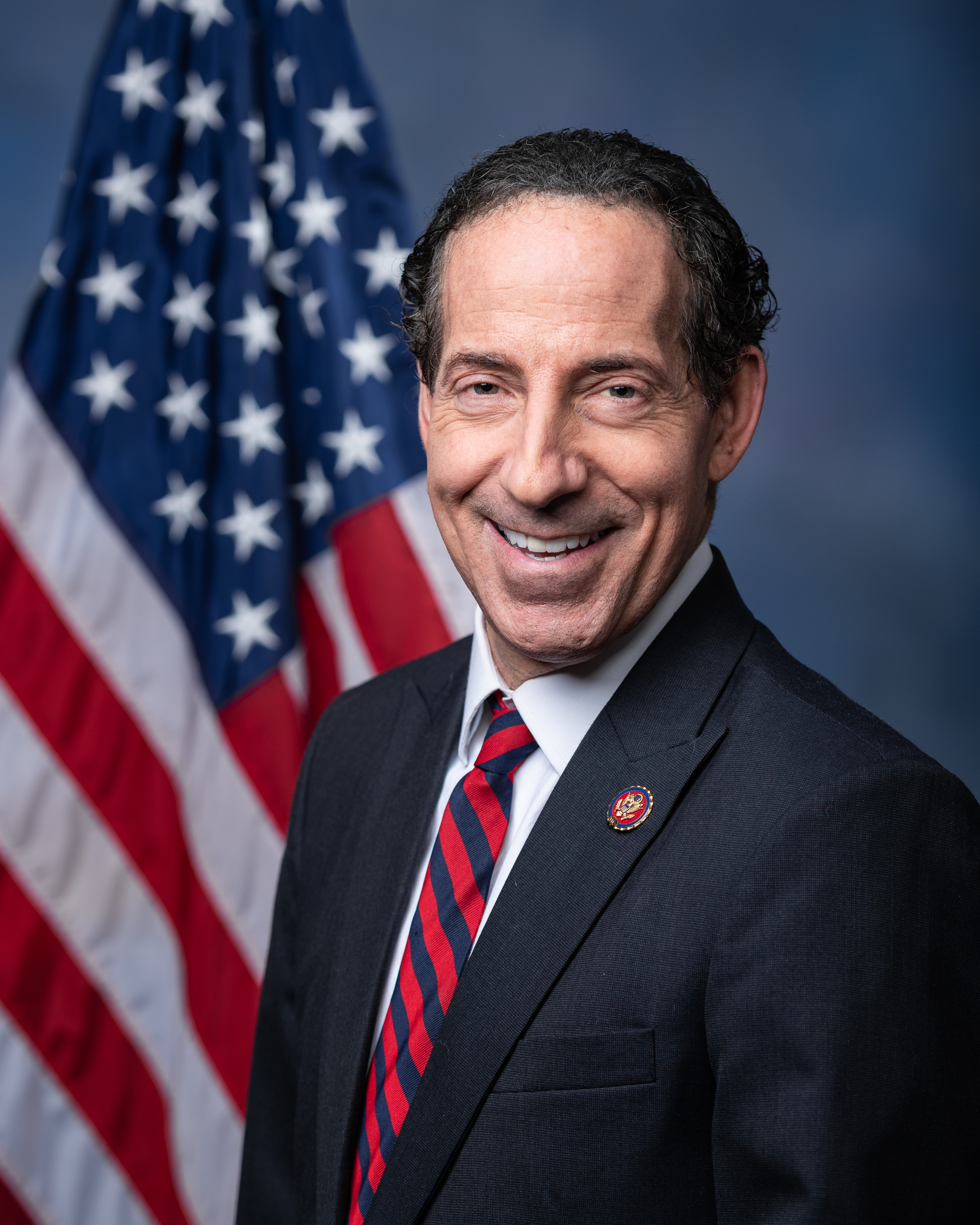
- Official portrait, 2019

Ranking Member of the House Judiciary Committee
- Incumbent
- Assumed office January 3, 2025
- Preceded by: Jerry Nadler

Ranking Member of the House Oversight Committee
- In office January 3, 2023 – January 3, 2025
- Preceded by: James Comer
- Succeeded by: Gerry Connolly

Member of the U.S. House of Representatives from Maryland's 8th district
- Incumbent
- Assumed office January 3, 2017
- Preceded by: Chris Van Hollen

Member of the Maryland Senate from the 20th district
- In office January 10, 2007 – November 10, 2016
- Preceded by: Ida G. Ruben
- Succeeded by: Will Smith

Personal details
- Born: Jamin Ben Raskin; December 13, 1962 (age 63) Washington, D.C., U.S.
- Party: Democratic
- Spouse: Sarah Bloom (m. 1990)
- Children: 3 (Note: One child is deceased.)
- Parents: Marcus Raskin (father); Barbara Bellman (mother)
- Relatives: Max Raskin (great uncle)
- Education: Harvard University (BA, JD)
- Website: House website Campaign website
- Raskin's voice Raskin on debate rules for the day's legislative calendar Recorded May 10, 2022

Jamin Ben "Jamie" Raskin (born December 13, 1962) is an American attorney, law professor, and politician serving as U.S. representative for Maryland's 8th congressional district since 2017. A progressive member of the Democratic Party, he served in the Maryland State Senate from 2007 to 2016. The district previously included portions of Montgomery County, a suburban county northwest of Washington, D.C., and extended through rural Frederick County to the Pennsylvania border. Since redistricting in 2022, Raskin's district encompasses much of Montgomery County and a sliver of Prince George's County.

Raskin co-chairs the Congressional Freethought Caucus. He was the lead impeachment manager in the second impeachment of President Donald Trump in response to the attack on the U.S. Capitol. Before his election to Congress, Raskin was a constitutional law professor at the American University Washington College of Law, where he co-founded and directed the LL.M. program on law and government and co-founded the Marshall-Brennan Constitutional Literacy Project.

== Early life and education ==
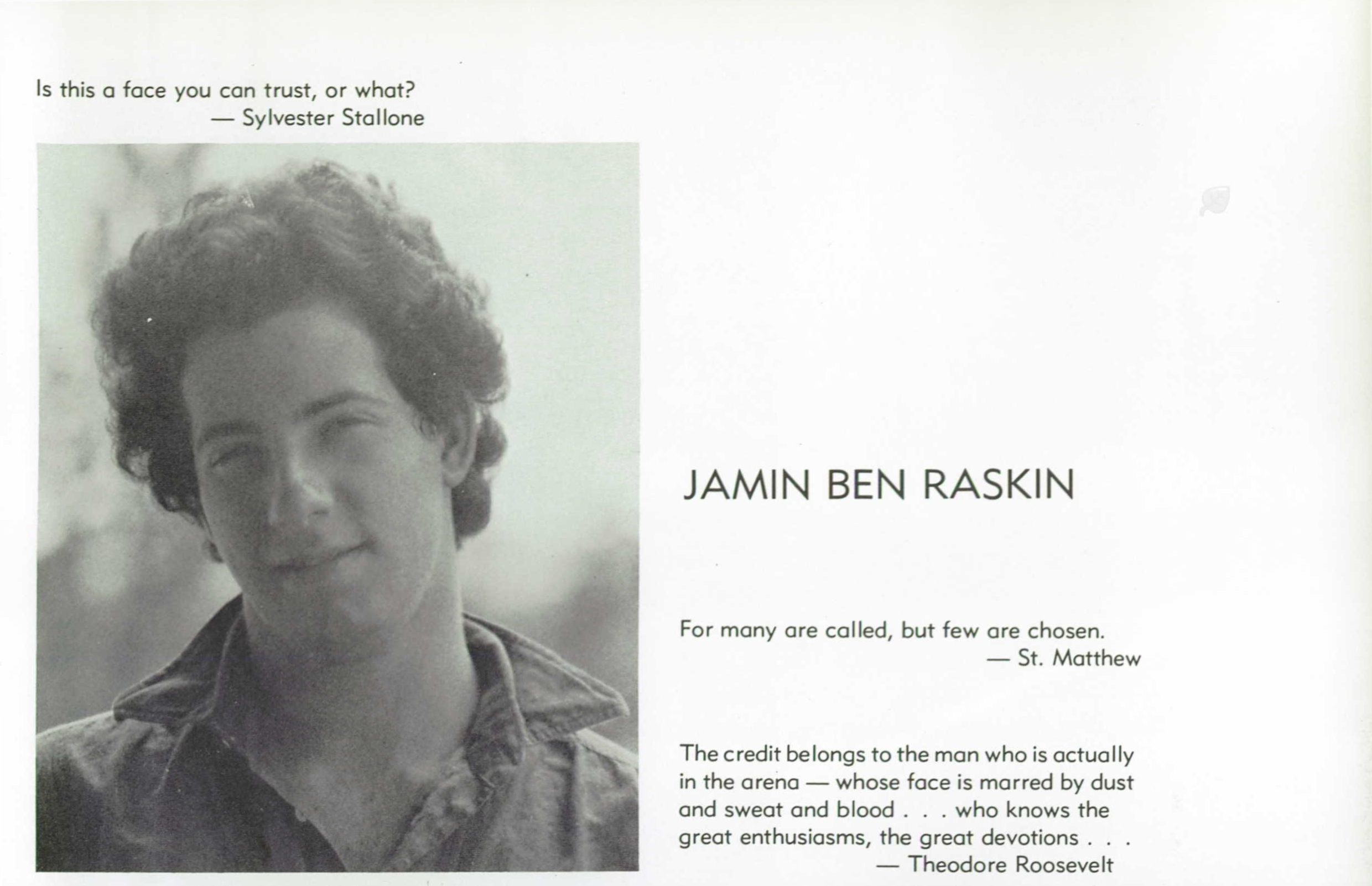
Raskin in the Georgetown Day School yearbook, 1979

Jamin Ben Raskin was born in Washington, D.C., on December 13, 1962, to Jewish parents Barbara (née Bellman) Raskin and Marcus Raskin. His name is a variant of that of his paternal grandfather, Benjamin Raskin. His mother was a journalist and novelist, and his father was a former staff aide to President John F. Kennedy on the National Security Council, co-founder of the Institute for Policy Studies, and a progressive activist. Raskin's ancestors immigrated to the United States from Russia.

Raskin graduated from Georgetown Day School in 1979 as a U.S. Presidential Scholar, and then magna cum laude and Phi Beta Kappa from Harvard College in 1983 with a Bachelor of Arts in government with a concentration in political theory. In 1987, he received a Juris Doctor magna cum laude from Harvard Law School, where he was an editor of the Harvard Law Review.

== Legal career ==
After graduating from law school, Raskin spent two years as an assistant attorney general in the Massachusetts Attorney General's Office. From 1989 to 1990, Raskin served as general counsel for Jesse Jackson's National Rainbow Coalition. In 1996, he represented Ross Perot regarding Perot's exclusion from the 1996 United States presidential debates. Raskin wrote a Washington Post op-ed that strongly condemned the Federal Election Commission and the Commission on Presidential Debates for their decisions.

Beginning in 1990, Raskin spent more than 25 years as a constitutional law professor at American University's Washington College of Law, where he taught future fellow impeachment manager Stacey Plaskett. He co-founded and directed the LL.M. program on law and government and co-founded the Marshall-Brennan Constitutional Literacy Project.

== Early political career ==
In 1999, Maryland Governor Parris Glendening appointed Raskin as the first chairman of the Maryland State Higher Education Labor Relations Board. Raskin later served as Doug Gansler's campaign manager in the 2006 Maryland Attorney General election.

== Maryland Senate ==
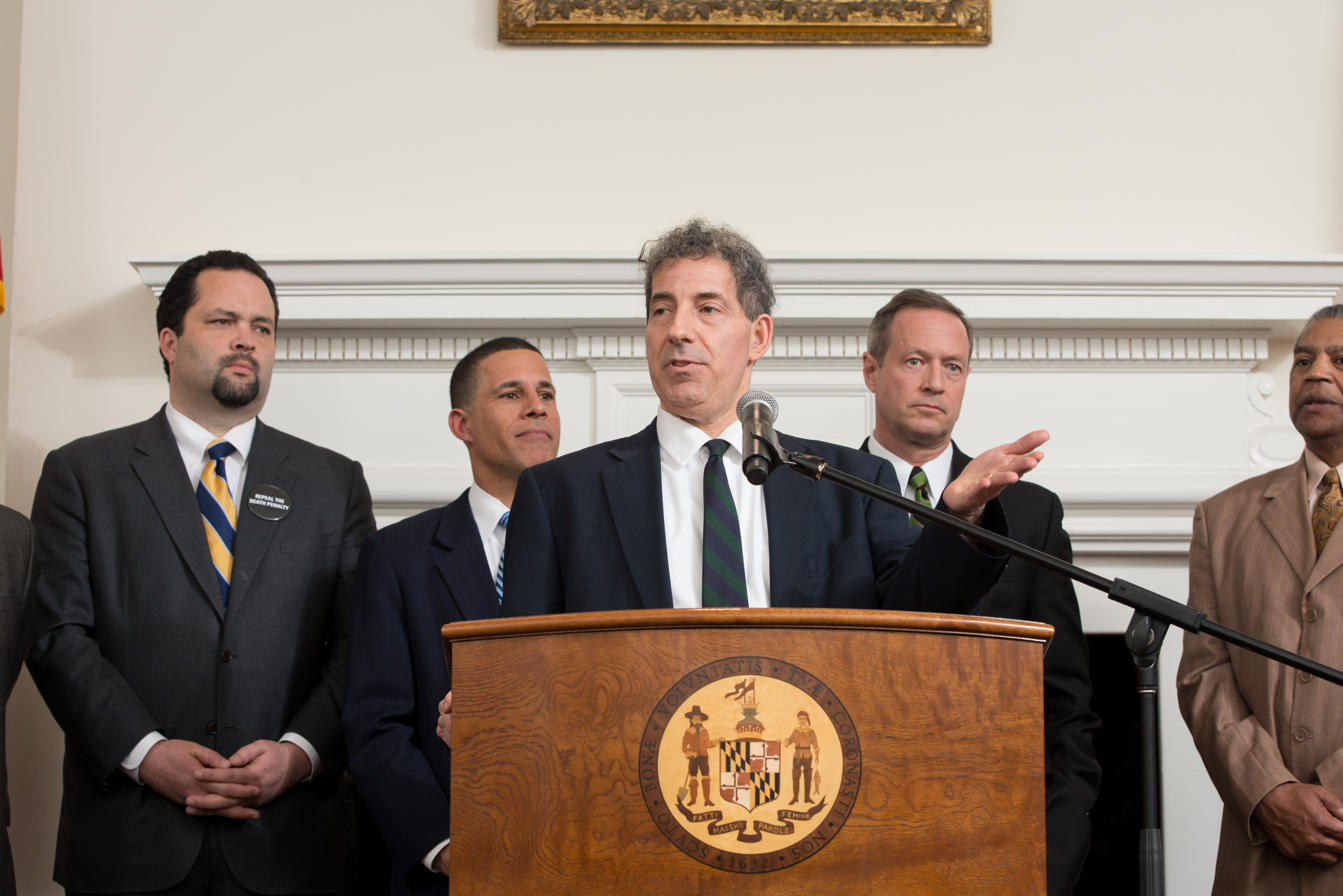
Raskin speaks at a press conference on the repeal of the death penalty in Maryland, 2013.

Raskin was elected to the Maryland Senate in 2006 after defeating incumbent state senator Ida G. Ruben in the Democratic primary election, in which he ran to the left of Ruben and ran unopposed in the general election. He represented District 20, which included parts of Silver Spring and Takoma Park in Montgomery County. In 2012, Raskin was named Senate majority whip and chaired the Montgomery County Senate Delegation and the Select Committee on Ethics Reform and was a member of the Judicial Proceedings Committee.

Raskin described himself as a "hands-on progressive" while in the legislature, sponsoring bills advocating repeal of the death penalty in Maryland, expansion of the state ignition interlock device program, and establishment of the legal guidelines for benefit corporations, a type of for-profit corporation that includes a material societal benefit in its bylaws and decision-making processes. A former board member of FairVote, he introduced and sponsored the first bill in the country for the National Popular Vote, a plan for an interstate compact to provide for presidential election by popular vote. Raskin long championed efforts to reform marijuana laws and legalize medical marijuana in Maryland. He introduced a medical marijuana bill in 2014 that was signed by Governor Martin O'Malley and went into effect in January 2015.

Raskin helped lead the fight to legalize same-sex marriage in Maryland. On March 1, 2006, during a Maryland State Senate hearing on same-sex marriage, Raskin was noted for his response to an opposing lawmaker: "Senator, when you took your oath of office, you placed your hand on the Bible and swore to uphold the Constitution. You did not place your hand on the Constitution and swear to uphold the Bible."

In 2008, the American Humanist Association awarded Raskin the Humanist Distinguished Service Award.

== U.S. House of Representatives ==
=== Elections ===
==== 2016 ====
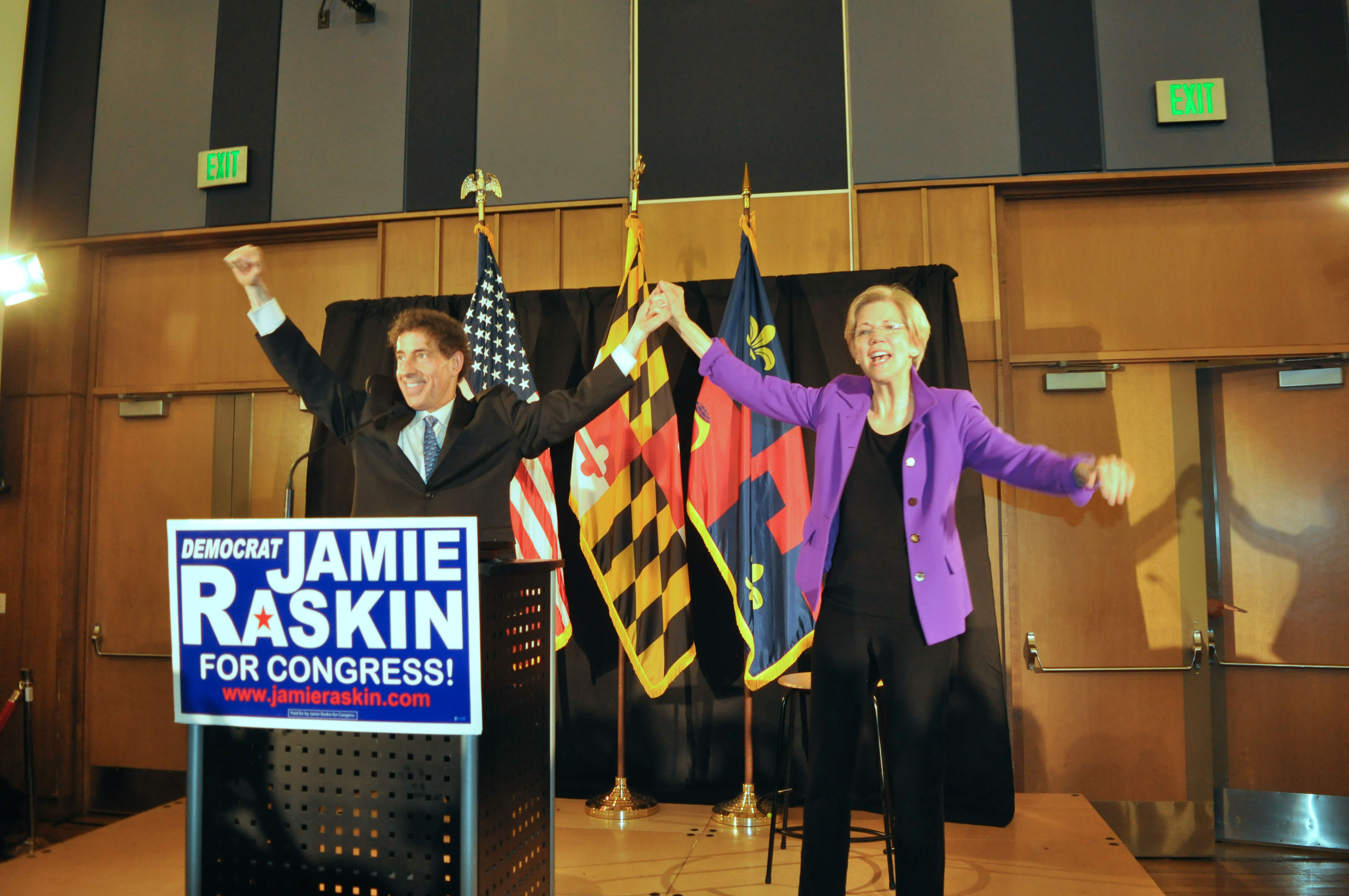
Raskin campaigning in 2016 with Senator Elizabeth Warren

On April 19, 2015, The Baltimore Sun and The Washington Post reported that Raskin announced his campaign for Congress and said, in response to observations that his positions were notably left-of-center, "My ambition is not to be in the political center, it is to be in the moral center." The district's seven-term incumbent, Chris Van Hollen, gave up the seat to run for the United States Senate.

During the primary, Raskin was endorsed by the Progressive Action PAC, the political arm of the Congressional Progressive Caucus. Raskin won the seven-way Democratic primary—the real contest in this heavily Democratic district—with 33% of the vote. He was viewed as the most liberal candidate in the race. The primary election was the most expensive House race in 2016, and Raskin was heavily outspent.

During the general election, Raskin was endorsed by both Bernie Sanders-affiliated political organizing network Our Revolution and community organizing effort People's Action. He defeated Republican nominee Dan Cox with 60% of the vote.

==== Reelection campaigns ====
In 2018, Raskin improved his margin to 68%, defeating Republican candidate John Walsh. He maintained the same margin in 2020 against Gregory Thomas Coll; he defeated Coll in a 2022 rematch by 80% redistricting after the 2020 United States census made the district more Democratic. He won reelection by similar margins again Republican nominee Cheryl Riley in 2024 and 2026.

=== Tenure ===
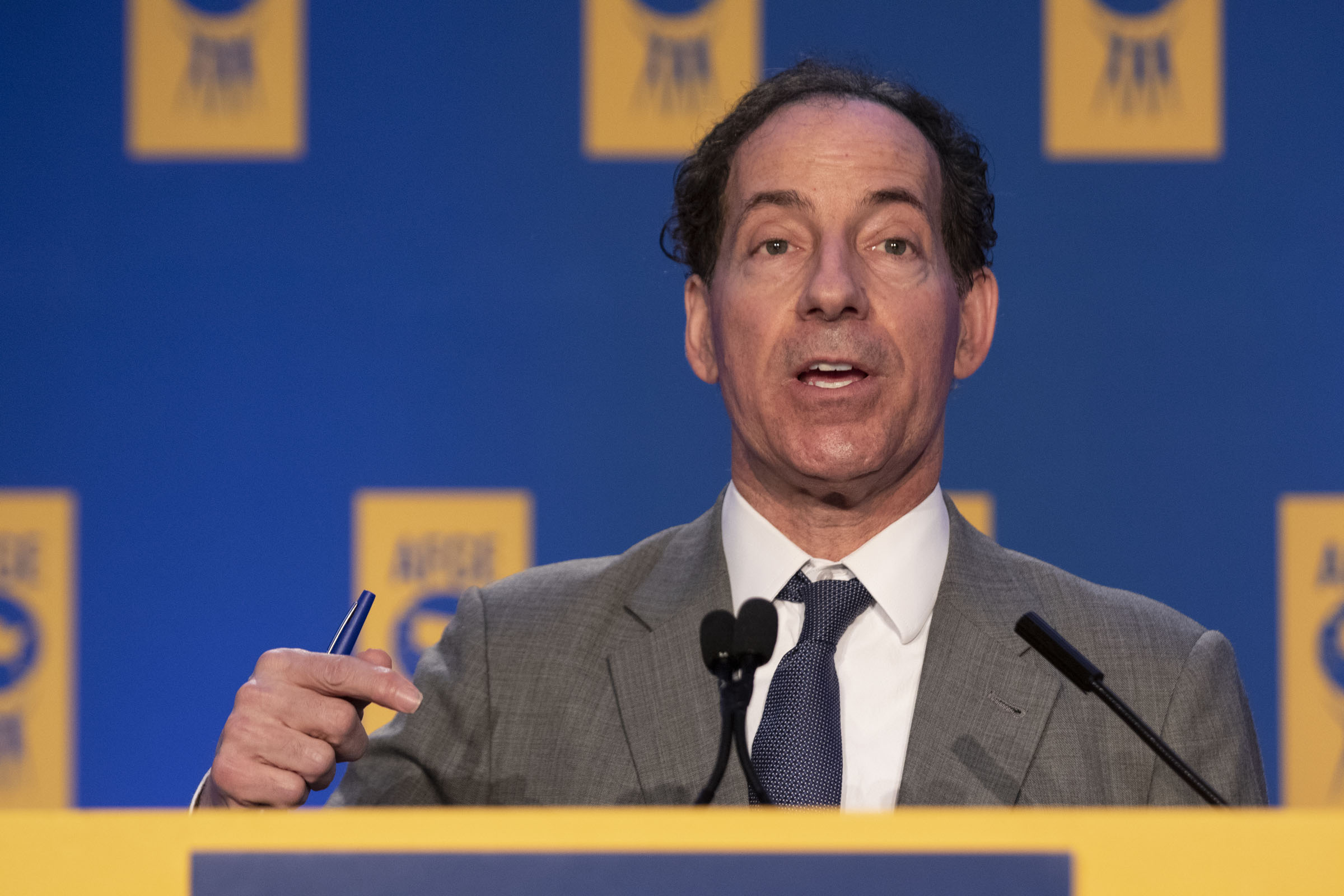
Raskin speaking at the 2020 AFGE Legislative Conference

As one of his first actions in Congress, Raskin and several other members of the House objected to certification of the 2016 United States presidential election in favor of Donald Trump due to alleged ties with Russia and Russia's interference in the 2016 election as well as voter suppression efforts. Then Vice President Joe Biden ruled their objection out of order because it had to be sponsored by at least one member of each chamber, and it had no Senate sponsor. Raskin questioned the legitimacy of the election, calling it tainted by Russian cyber-sabotage and by Republican voter suppression in several swing states.

In April 2018, Raskin, Jared Huffman, Jerry McNerney, and Dan Kildee launched the Congressional Freethought Caucus, whose stated goals are "pushing public policy formed on the basis of reason, science, and moral values", promoting "separation of church and state", and opposing discrimination against "atheists, agnostics, humanists, seekers, religious, and nonreligious persons". Huffman and Raskin are co-chairs. Both Huffman and Raskin received the Religious Liberty Award from the American Humanist Association in 2024.

On January 12, 2021, Raskin was named lead impeachment manager for the Senate impeachment trial held after Trump's second impeachment. He was the primary author of the impeachment article, along with Representatives David Cicilline and Ted Lieu, that charged Trump with inciting an insurrection at the United States Capitol. During the Senate trial, Raskin recounted that after being there on January 6 as the mob was forcibly entering, his daughter said to him, "Dad, I don't want to come back to the Capitol".

In February 2022, while his wife was under consideration for a position as the Federal Reserve's vice chair of supervision, it was reported that Raskin violated the Stop Trading on Congressional Knowledge Act by failing to properly disclose her share dealings. One instance was when his wife received stock for advising Reserve Trust, a Colorado-based financial technology trust company, and the other was her sale of that stock for $1.5 million, which was not disclosed for eight months. Reserve Trust was reported to have obtained unusual access to a Federal Reserve master account, although it was not clear when Bloom Raskin first acquired the shares.

==== Investigation into the January 6 attack on the Capitol ====
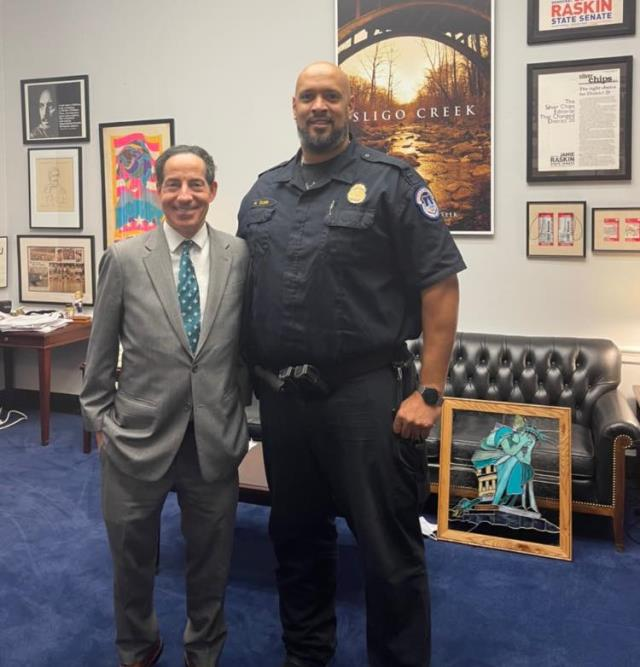
Raskin with Capitol Police officer Harry Dunn

On July 1, 2021, Raskin was one of seven Democrats appointed to the House Select Committee investigating the January 6 Capitol attack by Speaker Nancy Pelosi. Following the announcement, Raskin said, "As Chair of the Oversight Committee's Civil Rights and Civil Liberties Subcommittee, I've helped lead the Oversight Committee's painstaking investigation into violent white supremacy over the last two years. The Department of Homeland Security (DHS) has declared domestic violent extremism the number one security threat in the country. We saw that threat explode right in front of our eyes at the Capitol on January 6."

On July 12, 2022, Raskin co-led the Select Committee's seventh public hearing with Representative Stephanie Murphy. The hearing focused on the role that far-right extremist groups Proud Boys and Oath Keepers played in organizing the attack. It also discussed the importance of Trump's December 19 tweet "Big protest in D.C. on January 6th. Be there, will be wild!" and how it spread to his supporters. To show the impact, the committee played recordings of its interview with an anonymous Twitter employee who worked from 2020 to 2021 and was on the team responsible for the platform's content moderation policies. During the interview, they said the tweet served as a "call to action, and in some cases as a call to arms" to his supporters.

In his closing statement at the July 12 hearing, Raskin said Trump had become the first president to summon a crowd to the capital to block the constitutional transfer of power, and argued that Trump had sent an angry and armed crowd to the Capitol knowing what it was.

Raskin was nominated for the 2025 Nobel Peace Prize for his "defense of freedom and democracy," along with the other members of the January 6th Committee.

==== Preemptive pardon ====
In the final hours of his presidency on January 20, 2025, President Joe Biden issued preemptive pardons to the members and staff of the January 6 select committee, including Raskin, as well as to the Capitol and D.C. police officers who had testified before the panel. Raskin, who learned of the pardon from reporters on the morning of the inauguration, called it "a sign of our strange times" that public servants had to be pardoned for doing their jobs.

==== Ranking member of the Judiciary Committee ====
In December 2024, Raskin gave up his position atop the Oversight Committee to challenge Jerry Nadler, who had led Judiciary Committee Democrats since 2017, for the panel's ranking member post. Nadler withdrew from the race days later and endorsed Raskin, and on December 18, 2024, Raskin was elected ranking member by the House Democratic Caucus after being recommended by its Steering and Policy Committee. He took up the role at the beginnning of the 119th Congress.

=== Committee assignments ===
- United States House Committee on the Judiciary (Ranking Member)
  - As Ranking Member of the committee, Rep. Raskin is entitled to sit as an ex officio member in all subcommittee meetings, per the committee's rules.

=== Party leadership and caucus membership ===
- Black Maternal Health Caucus
- House Democratic Caucus, Senior Whip
- House Democratic Steering and Policy Committee,
- Congressional Progressive Caucus, Vice Chair and Liaison to New Members
- Congressional LGBT Equality Caucus
- House Pro-Choice Caucus
- House Public Education Caucus
- House Quiet Skies Caucus
- House 115th Class Caucus
- House Baltic Caucus
- Congressional Freethought Caucus, co-founder and co-chair
- Congressional Asian Pacific American Caucus
- Congressional Caucus on Turkey and Turkish Americans
- Congressional NextGen 9-1-1 Caucus
- Congressional Solar Caucus
- Medicare for All Caucus
- Congressional Caucus for the Equal Rights Amendment
- Congressional Taiwan Caucus
- Rare Disease Caucus

=== Trump cryptocurrency report ===
On November 25, 2025, Raskin released a report finding that following an investigation by Democrats on the U.S. House Judiciary Committee, it was determined that the cryptocurrency policies of Trump were in fact used to benefit Trump and his family, with Trump in fact adding billions of dollars to his net worth through cryptocurrency schemes which were entangled with foreign governments, corporate allies, and criminal actors. The report, title Trump, Crypto, and a New Age of Corruption, also found that Trump dismantled anti-corruption safeguards and pardoned people who were regarded as "corporate croonies" in order build his cryptocurrency empire.

== Political positions ==
=== Food and agriculture ===
In 2019, Raskin cosponsored Senator Cory Booker's Farm System Reform Act, which would have imposed a moratorium on the construction of new concentrated animal feeding operations (CAFOs), phased out large CAFOs over 20 years, and created a fund to transition farmers away from intensive animal farming to other agricultural operations.

In July 2022, Raskin led a letter by 32 members of Congress to the White House Conference on Hunger, Nutrition, and Health asking the Biden administration to require that all federal facilities offer a daily vegetarian entrée option. In September 2022, the White House National Strategy on Hunger, Nutrition, and Health included a nonbinding pledge to increase plant-based offerings across federal facilities, including federal buildings, national parks, prisons, military bases, and Veterans Affairs hospitals. In March 2024, Raskin led a letter by 55 members of Congress urging the administration to follow through with the proposal and increase plant-based offerings.

=== Foreign policy ===
In March 2023, Raskin voted against H.Con.Res. 21, which directed President Joe Biden to remove U.S. troops from Syria within 180 days.

On November 17, 2023, Raskin called for a humanitarian pause in the Gaza war or a "mutually agreed-upon cease-fire" that would "provide for a ‘global humanitarian surge’ of aid to hundreds of thousands of displaced and suffering innocent civilians throughout Gaza." In August 2025, Raskin cosponsored the "Block the Bombs Act", which would block offensive weapons to Israel. In 2026, he voted for an amendment by Thomas Massie to a State Department appropriations bill to eliminate all regularly appropriated US aid to Israel.

=== LGBTQ rights ===
Raskin supports banning discrimination based on sexual orientation and gender identity. In 2019, he voted in favor of the Equality Act and urged Congress members to do the same.

=== Oversight Commission on Presidential Capacity ===
In June 2017, Raskin was the chief sponsor of legislation to establish a congressional "oversight" commission which would be tasked with determining whether the president was unfit, physically or mentally, to perform his duties. The commission's evaluation could support removing the president from office under the Twenty-fifth Amendment to the United States Constitution.

== Electoral history ==
=== 2016 ===
Democratic primary, Congress, Maryland 8th district, 2016
Party	Candidate	Votes	%
Democratic	Jamie Raskin	43,776	33.6%
Democratic	David Trone	35,400	27.1%
Democratic	Kathleen Matthews	31,186	23.9%
Democratic	Ana Sol Gutierrez	7,185	5.5%
Democratic	Will Jawando	6,058	4.6%
Democratic	Kumar P. Barve	3,149	2.4%
Democratic	David M. Anderson	1,511	1.2%
Democratic	Joel Rubin	1,426	1.1%
Democratic	Dan Bolling	712	0.5%
Majority		8,376	6.5%
Total votes		130,403	100.0%

Congress, Maryland 8th district, 2016
Party	Candidate	Votes	%	±%
Democratic	Jamie Raskin	220,657	60.6%	−0.3
Republican	Dan Cox	124,651	34.2%	−5.5
Green	Nancy Wallace	11,201	3.1%	+3.1
Libertarian	Jasen Wunder	7,283	2.0%	+2.0
Write-ins		532	0.1%	−0.1
Majority		96,006	26.4%	+4.7
Total votes		364,324	100.0%	

=== 2018 ===
Democratic primary, Congress, Maryland 8th district, 2018
Party	Candidate	Votes	%
Democratic	Jamie Raskin	74,303	90.5%
Democratic	Summer Spring	4,759	5.80%
Democratic	Utam Paul	3,032	3.70%
Total votes		82,094	100.0%

Congress, Maryland 8th district, 2018
Party	Candidate	Votes	%	±%
Democratic	Jamie Raskin	217,679	68.2%	+7.6
Republican	John Walsh	96,525	30.2%	−4.0
Libertarian	Jasen Wunder	4,853	1.5%	−0.5
Write-ins		273	0.1%	−
Majority		121,154	37.9%	+11.5
Total votes		319,330	100.0%	

=== 2020 ===
Democratic primary, Congress, Maryland 8th district, 2020
Party	Candidate	Votes	%
Democratic	Jamie Raskin	97,087	86.6%
Democratic	Marcia H. Morgan	9,160	8.2%
Democratic	Lih Young	4,261	3.8%
Democratic	Utam Paul	1,651	1.5%
Total votes		112,159	100.0%

Congress, Maryland 8th district, 2020
Party	Candidate	Votes	%	±%
Democratic	Jamie Raskin	274,716	68.2%	+0.1
Republican	Gregory Coll	127,157	31.6%	+1.4
Write-ins		741	0.2%	+0.1
Majority		147,559	36.7%	−1.3
Total votes		402,614	100.0%	

=== 2022 ===
Democratic primary, Congress, Maryland 8th district, 2022
Party	Candidate	Votes	%
Democratic	Jamie Raskin	109,055	93.9
Democratic	Andalib Odulaye	7,075	6.1%
Total votes		116,130	100.0%

Congress, Maryland 8th district, 2022
Party	Candidate	Votes	%	±%
Democratic	Jamie Raskin	211,842	80.2%	+12.0
Republican	Gregory Coll	47,965	18.1%	−12.5
Libertarian	Andrés Garcia	4,125	1.6%	N/A
Write-ins		274	0.1%	−0.1
Majority		163,877	62.0%	+25.3
Total votes		264,206	100.0%	

=== 2024 ===
Democratic primary, Congress, Maryland 8th district, 2024
Party	Candidate	Votes	%
Democratic	Jamie Raskin	103,071	94.8%
Democratic	Eric Felber	5,636	5.2%
Total votes		108,707	100.0%

Congress, Maryland 8th district, 2024
Party	Candidate	Votes	%	±%
Democratic	Jamie Raskin	292,101	76.8%	−3.4
Republican	Cheryl Riley	77,821	20.5%	+2.3
Green	Nancy Wallace	9,612	2.5%	N/A
Write-ins		786	0.2%	+0.1
Majority		214,280	56.3%	−5.7
Total votes		380,320	100.0%	

== Personal life ==
Raskin is married to Sarah Bloom Raskin, who served as Maryland Commissioner of Financial Regulation from 2007 to 2010. They live in Takoma Park, Maryland. President Barack Obama nominated Bloom Raskin to the Federal Reserve Board on April 28, 2010. On October 4, 2010, she was sworn in as a governor of the Federal Reserve Board by Fed Chairman Ben Bernanke. President Joe Biden nominated her for chair of the Federal Reserve Board, but Republicans boycotted her committee hearing, and Joe Manchin opposed her because of her views on the use of monetary policy to address climate change. Given that stalemate, she withdrew her nomination. She served as United States Deputy Secretary of the Treasury from March 19, 2014, to January 20, 2017.

The Raskins have two daughters, Hannah and Tabitha, and had a son named Tommy. On December 31, 2020, Raskin's office announced that his son Tommy, a graduate of Montgomery Blair High School, a graduate of Amherst College and a second-year student at Harvard Law School, had died at the age of 25. On January 4, 2021, Raskin and his wife posted a tribute to their son online that stated that after a prolonged battle with depression, Tommy had died by suicide. In a farewell note, Tommy said, "Please forgive me. My illness won today. Look after each other, the animals, and the global poor. All my love, Tommy." Tommy was buried on January 5, 2021. The next day, Raskin was in the Capitol with his daughter and son-in-law during the Capitol attack. Hours later, he began drafting an article of impeachment against President Trump, and six days later, House Speaker Nancy Pelosi named Raskin lead manager of Trump's second impeachment. Raskin's 2022 book Unthinkable: Trauma, Truth, and the Trials of American Democracy focuses on his son's life and his preparation for the impeachment trial. He was also the subject of an MSNBC documentary film titled Love & The Constitution, which covered his first three years in Congress and his fight to uphold the constitution during Trump's presidency. The film also captured the loss of his son and Raskin's appointment as lead impeachment manager in Trump's second impeachment trial.

Raskin has been vegetarian since 2009.

=== Health ===
In May 2010, Raskin was diagnosed with colon cancer. He received six weeks of radiation and chemotherapy as well as surgery to remove part of his colon, followed by more chemotherapy through early 2011.

In December 2022, Raskin announced that he had been diagnosed with diffuse large B-cell lymphoma and said he would undergo chemoimmunotherapy, which he completed in April 2023. To mask the hair loss that occurred because of the treatments, Raskin often publicly wore bandanas, some of which were gifts from musician and actor Steven Van Zandt, who has long worn one as a trademark. On April 27, 2023, Raskin said the cancer was in remission.

== Selected works ==
=== Books ===
- The Wealth Primary: Campaign Fundraising and the Constitution (1994) (with John Bonifaz)
- Overruling Democracy: The Supreme Court versus the American People (2003)
- We the Students: Supreme Court Cases for and about Students (2014)
- Youth Justice in America (2014) (with Maryam Ahranjani and Andrew G. Ferguson)
- Unthinkable — Trauma, Truth, and the Trials of American Democracy (2022)

=== Scholarly articles ===
- Raskin, Jamie B. (1993). "Legal Aliens, Local Citizens: The Historical, Constitutional and Theoretical Meanings of Alien Suffrage". University of Pennsylvania Law Review. 141 (4): 1391–1470.
- — (1995). "Affirmative Action and Racial Reaction". Howard Law Journal. 38 (3): 521–60.
- — (1998). "The Supreme Court's Racial Double Standard in Redistricting: Unequal Protection in Politics and the Scholarship that Defends It". Journal of Law & Politics. 14 (4): 591–666.
- — (1999). "Debate Gerrymander". Texas Law Review. 77 (7): 1943–2000.
- — (1999). "Is This America? The District of Columbia and the Right to Vote". Harvard Civil Rights–Civil Liberties Law Review. 34 (1): 39–98.
- —; LeBlanc, Clark L. (2001). "Disfavored Speech about Favored Rights: Hill v. Colorado, the Vanishing Public Forum and the Need for an Objective Speech Discrimination Test". American University Law Review. 51 (2): 179–228.

=== Op-eds ===
- How to Force Justices Alito and Thomas to Recuse Themselves in the Jan. 6 Cases (2024)

== Notes ==
U.S. House of Representatives
Preceded by Chris Van Hollen	Member of the U.S. House of Representatives from Maryland's 8th congressional district 2017–present	Incumbent
Preceded by James Comer	Ranking Member of the House Oversight Committee; 2023–2025	Succeeded by Gerry Connolly
Preceded by Jim Jordan	Ranking Member of the House Judiciary Committee; 2025–present	Incumbent
U.S. order of precedence (ceremonial)
Preceded by Jimmy Panetta	United States representatives by seniority 175th	Succeeded by John Rutherford
