= Community power =

Approach to public service design and delivery

Community power is an approach to public service design and delivery, primarily influential in British local government.

It is characterised by an adherence to "principles of devolution, localisation and democratisation" and foregrounds the belief that "communities have knowledge, skills and assets which mean they themselves are well placed to identify and respond to any challenges that they face". In practice, proponents of community power seek to create public services that are non-transactional, non-hierarchical, and where local communities and communities of interest are able to shape the parts of the state that they interact with.

A range of think-tanks and charities are associated with promoting community power, including New Local, Power to Change, The Cares Family, Locality, The Young Foundation, People’s Health Trust, Friends Provident Foundation, and Local Trust. Similarly, community power has been endorsed by politicians from across the British political spectrum, both at national and local levels.

== Approach ==
Community power advocates contrast their approach to public service design and delivery with other models that they characterise as being driven by either state or market. Community power critiques state-led approaches as being overly hierarchical, professionalized and paternalistic, and market-led ones as being overly transactional and target-driven.

The idea of more community focused forms of public service design and delivery is to avoid these dynamics, and to co-produce solutions to the challenges that those using public services face. By foregrounding people’s wants and needs, rather than a ‘service offer’, the idea is to create public services that are better able to respond to the complexities of people’s lives, while being more preventative and resilient.

Examples of practices associated with community power include co-production, social proscribing, community organising, local area coordination and deliberative democracy.

== Background ==
Beyond being a critique of state and market driven modes of public service delivery, community power sees itself as representing a response to a particular set of challenges facing the British public sector in the 21st century.

One of these challenges is the fact that demand has been rising for acute public services of all kinds since 2010, while budgets, especially in local government, have been cut substantially. As such, community power sees itself as being a way for public services to become more preventative – allowing public sector professionals to work with people to prevent them reaching the point at which they need to access expensive and acute public services, so as to tackle the issue of spiralling demand.

Another perceived challenge relates to Britain’s unusual level of centralisation, and an interpretation of political events in this country since 2016 as being driven by a dissatisfaction on the part of the British public with democratic institutions. Community power seeks to address these issues by aiming to deepen people’s ability to shape the state and localising decision-making

Intellectually, community power advocates have cited a range of thinkers as influencing their approaches. These include Elinor Ostrom, Peter Kropotkin, Hillary Cottam and Ted Howard.

== Impact ==
At the level of local government, over sixty councils currently pay to be members of New Local’s network, which aims to equip local authorities with the tools to "transform public services and unlock community power".

At the national level, a group of 10 Conservative Party MPs co-authored a report exploring the potential for a right-wing vision of community power. On the left, community power has been endorsed by figures such as Andy Burnham, Kim Leadbitter and institutions like the Cooperative Party.

A group of organisations interested in community power have also launched a parliamentary campaign entitled ‘We’re Right Here’ aimed at passing a national "community power act", which would give ‘communities a legal right to self determination’ and bake in the principle of subsidiarity into British public service decision making.

== Response ==
Community power has at various times been critiqued from the political left. Critics have compared community power to David Cameron’s vision of the Big Society, and questioned whether conservative interest in community power means that it is simply being used as a cover for further austerity.

Proponents of community power have tended to reject the Big Society comparison, and on the question of austerity, argued that community power doesn't necessarily imply a bigger or smaller state, just a different kind of public service design and delivery.
