= David Shub =

Exiled Russian revolutionary, historian (1887–1973)

David Shub (Yiddish: דוד שוב, Russian: Давид Натанович Шуб, romanized: David Natanovich Shub) (13 September 1887 – 27 May 1973) was a Russian-born Jewish-American social democratic activist, journalist, and historian.

In 1930 he wrote the lead article on Stalin, probably the first authoritative profile to appear in the American press, for The New York Times Magazine (22 March 1930). His 1948 biography of Lenin has been reprinted over sixteen times, described as "indispensable to the student of contemporary history, of Russia, and of social revolution."

== Biography ==
=== Early years ===
David Shub was born and educated in Potov, Vilna district, Russian Empire, today part of Belarus. He became political during his school years, joining an illegal social democratic circle associated with the Bund called Shkola borbu [School of Struggle] while a student in gymnasium. In 1903 he joined the Russian Social Democratic Labour Party (RSDLP).

Shub lived in emigation from 1904 to 1905, making his home in London, Paris, and Geneva. There he made the acquaintance of other members of the anti-tsarist revolutionary movement, including Georgi Plekhanov, Pavel Axelrod, Vera Zasulich, Alexander Bogdanov, Vladimir Lenin, Anatoly Lunacharsky, Vladimir Bonch-Bruyevich, Iulii Martov, Alexander Potresov, and Fyodor Dan.

With the eruption of the Russian Revolution of 1905, Shub made his way home to Russia, arriving in September of that year. He was an active participant in the revolutionary movement until his arrest by the tsarist secret police late in 1906. He was sentenced to a term of exile in Siberia, from which he escaped in 1907, emigrating this time to America.

=== Life in America ===
Shub arrived in the United States in 1908.

Shub was an editor of the Jewish Daily Forward for 45 years, joining the editing board in 1924. He wrote and solicited articles about the international Socialist movement.

Shub retired in 1969, though he continued to contribute articles in Yiddish and Russian in other publications for the rest of his life.

=== Death and legacy ===
He died on May 27, 1973, in a Miami Beach hospital from complications following a series of heart attacks. He was survived by a daughter, Mona (a social worker), with whom he lived; a son Anatole Shub, editor of Radio Free Europe; a daughter-in-law, Elizabeth Shub, writer, editor, and translator; and three grandchildren.

His son, Boris Shub (1912–1965), was also a well-known writer and pioneer in radio broadcasting to Communist countries; he was one of the key organizers of Radio Liberty.

== Works ==
- Lenin, der mentsh, der revolutsyoner un diḳtaṭor, a politishe byografye fun dem komunizm [Lenin, the Man, the Revolutionary, and Dictator: A Political Biography of Communism] New York: Veker, 1928.
- Heldn un martirer, di geshikhte fun di amolike groyse rusishe revolutsyonern un fun zeyer heroishn kamf far frayhayt [Heroes and Martyrs: The History of the Great Russian Revolutionaries of the Past and of their Heroic Struggle for Freedom] Warsaw: Bzshoza, 1939. (Note: Hebrew translation by M. Benayahu as Haloḥamim leḥerut [The Fighters for Freedom] Tel Aviv: M. Nyuman, 1945/1946.)
- Socialism, Fascism, Communism. Editor, with Joseph Shaplen. New York: American League for Democratic Socialism, 1934.
- Fashizm un komunizm, vi azoy moskve hot geholfn brengen fashizm un natsizm af der velt [Fascism and Communism: How Moscow Helped Bring Fascism and Nazism to the World] New York: Veker, 1939.
- What Do You Know About British Labor? With Robert Alexander. New York: Rand School Publications, 1946.
- Lenin: A Biography. Garden City, NY: Doubleday & Co., 1948.
- Fun di amolike yorn, bletlekh zikhroynes. [From Years Past: Pages of Memoirs] Two volumes. New York, 1967.
- Sotsyale denker un kemfer [Social Thinkers and Fighters] Two volumes. Mexico City: Shloyme Mendelson Fund, 1968.
- Politicheskie deiateli Rossii (1850-ykh—1920-ykh gg.): Sbornik statei [Political Figures of Russia, 1850s to 1920s: Collection of Articles] New York, NY: Novaia zhurnal, 1969.
