= Barbara Raskin =

American writer

- Born: Barbara Bellman; August 25, 1935; Minneapolis, Minnesota
- Died: July 23, 1999 (aged 63); Baltimore, Maryland
- Occupations: Journalist, novelist
- Spouses: Marcus Raskin (div. 1980) Anatole Shub (before 1999)
- Children: 3; including Jamie Raskin
- Relatives: Max Raskin (uncle in law)

Barbara Raskin (August 25, 1936 – July 23, 1999) was an American journalist and novelist. She was known for her 1987 best-selling novel Hot Flashes.

== Biography ==
Raskin née Bellman was born on August 25, 1935, in Minneapolis, Minnesota, to Samuel H. Bellman (1906–1999) and Sally (Finkelstein) Bellman (1907–1995). She attended the University of Minnesota, and the University of Chicago.

Raskin worked for time as a flight attendant before settling in Washington, D.C. Raskin wrote for a variety of publications including The New Republic, The New York Times and The Washington Post.

Raskin wrote five novels; The National Anthem (1977), Out of Order (1979), Hot Flashes (1987), Loose Ends (1988), and Current Affairs (1990). Hot Flashes was her best-selling novel, staying on The New York Times Best Seller list for four months and selling 1.5 million copies in hardcover and paperback.

Raskin was involved with organizations associated with writing and journalism. She served as chair of the National Writers Union from 1982 to 1983. She was a co-founder of Washington Independent Writers (now the American Independent Writers). In 1982 she was the recipient of a fiction award from the National Endowment for the Arts.

Raskin was married to the political activist Marcus Raskin with whom she had three children, including Congressman Jamie Raskin. They divorced in 1980. In 1984 she married Anatole Shub. That marriage ended in divorce.

Raskin died on July 23, 1999, in Baltimore, Maryland, of complications after surgery for a vascular disease.
