= Congressional Freethought Caucus =

Caucus in the U.S. House of Representatives

- Co-chairs: Jared Huffman and Jamie Raskin
- Founded: April 25, 2018
- Ideology: Secularism; Evidence-based policy
- National affiliation: Nominally: Nonpartisan; De facto: Democratic Party
- Colors: Blue
- Seats in the Senate Democratic Caucus: 0 / 47
- Seats in the United States Senate: 0 / 100
- Seats in the House Democratic Caucus: 36 / 214 (plus 1 non-voting)
- Seats in the United States House of Representatives: 36 / 435 (plus 1 non-voting)

Website
- Congressional Freethought Caucus

The Congressional Freethought Caucus is a membership organization in the United States House of Representatives established to promote policy solutions based on reason and science, and to defend the secular character of government. Representatives Jared Huffman and Jamie Raskin have co-chaired the caucus since its April 2018 formation.

== Background ==
The Congressional Freethought Caucus was unveiled by Huffman during the Secular Coalition for America annual awards dinner in Washington, DC. The Secular Coalition for America released a statement applauding the founding members of the caucus: "The formation of a Congressional Freethought Caucus is a milestone moment for nonreligious Americans in our continued struggle for inclusion in the political process and recognition as a constituency. We are living in a time when one-quarter of Americans identify as nonreligious and yet, despite these demographic changes, our community is still disparaged, stigmatized, and underrepresented in elected offices at every level of government. By proudly and unapologetically standing up for the nonreligious, these Members of Congress have struck a powerful blow against the de facto religious test that keeps so many secular Americans from seeking public office."

According to a 2019 Gallup poll, only 60% of Americans would vote an atheist for president. This is lower than the number who would vote for an African American, Jewish, gay, or Muslim candidate.

== Electoral results ==
Election year	Overall seats	Democratic seats	Non-voting
2018	13 / 435	13 / 235	1 delegate
2020	17 / 435	17 / 222	1 delegate
2022	22 / 435	22 / 213	1 delegate
2024	23 / 435	23 / 215	1 delegate

== History ==
The CFC was formed in April 2018 by four members of the U.S. House: Representatives Jared Huffman, Jamie Raskin, Jerry McNerney, and Dan Kildee, soon joined by Pramila Jayapal.

The caucus was established in reaction to the influence of religion, especially that of the Christian right, in public policymaking in ways that the caucus's founders deem inappropriate in a secular government. They see such influence as hampering effective and appropriate responses to issues ranging from climate change to gun violence. Huffman has identified as a humanist without a God belief, but has indicated that the caucus is open to religious members who support the use of science and reason and defend a secular government. The American Humanist Association and the Center for Freethought Equality were involved in "helping establish the caucus" by consultation.

Former House of Representatives historian Ray Smock and historian of science and religion Stephen Weldon have noted what they see as the caucus's unique and historic nature. Smock says it hearkens back to the Enlightenment ideas from the founding of the nation, and Weldon points out the political liability of being non-religious. Raskin called the caucus "historic", while Huffman stated it would "help spark an open dialogue about science and reason-based policy".

By September 2018, the caucus had added four more members and actively opposed Brett Kavanaugh's nomination to the Supreme Court of the United States. Membership has since expanded modestly over time, with the latest members joining in June 2026.

== List of chairs ==
Term start	Term end	Chair(s)
2018	present	Reps. Jared Huffman (CA‑2) and Jamie Raskin (MD‑8)

== House members ==
All current members caucus with the Democratic Party; the 119th Congress has 37 declared members.

Arizona

- Yassamin Ansari (AZ‑3)

California

- Ami Bera (CA‑6)
- Julia Brownley (CA‑26)
- Gil Cisneros (CA‑31)
- Judy Chu (CA‑28)
- Laura Friedman (CA‑30)
- Robert Garcia (CA‑42)
- Jimmy Gomez (CA‑34)
- Jared Huffman (CA‑2), co-chair
- Zoe Lofgren (CA‑19)
- Kevin Mullin (CA‑15)

Delaware

- Sarah McBride (DE‑AL)

Florida

- Maxwell Frost (FL‑10)

Georgia

- Hank Johnson (GA‑4)

Illinois

- Sean Casten (IL‑6)
- Delia Ramirez (IL‑3)
- Jan Schakowsky (IL‑9)

Maryland

- Jamie Raskin (MD‑8), co-chair

Michigan

- Rashida Tlaib (MI‑13)

Minnesota

- Kelly Morrison (MN‑3)

New Jersey

- Herb Conaway (NJ‑3)

New York

- Jerry Nadler (NY‑12)

Oregon

- Suzanne Bonamici (OR‑1)
- Maxine Dexter (OR‑3)
- Val Hoyle (OR‑4)
- Andrea Salinas (OR‑6)

Pennsylvania

- Chris Deluzio (PA‑17)

Tennessee

- Steve Cohen (TN‑9)

Texas

- Greg Casar (TX‑35)
- Lloyd Doggett (TX‑37)
- Lizzie Fletcher (TX‑7)

Vermont

- Becca Balint (VT‑AL)

Virginia

- Don Beyer (VA‑8)

Washington

- Pramila Jayapal (WA‑7)
- Emily Randall (WA‑6)

Washington, D.C.

- Eleanor Holmes Norton (DC‑AL)

Wisconsin

- Mark Pocan (WI‑2)

=== Former members ===
- Dan Kildee (MI‑5), term ended January 2025
- Carolyn Maloney (NY‑12), term ended January 2023
- Jerry McNerney (CA‑9), term ended January 2023
- Eric Swalwell (CA‑14), resigned April 2026
- Susan Wild (PA‑7), term ended January 2025

== Policy positions ==
Coordinator of the Freethought Equality Fund Political Action Committee, Ron Millar, who participated in planning the caucus, stated specific aims the aforementioned PAC "wants to see", including "action against climate change"; "access to contraception and abortion"; and "maintaining" the Johnson Amendment (which establishes that tax-exempt nonprofits like religious organizations cannot endorse political candidates), among others.

== See also ==
- Establishment Clause
- Free Exercise Clause
- All-Party Parliamentary Humanist Group (UK counterpart)
