= Institute for Policy Studies =

American progressive think tank

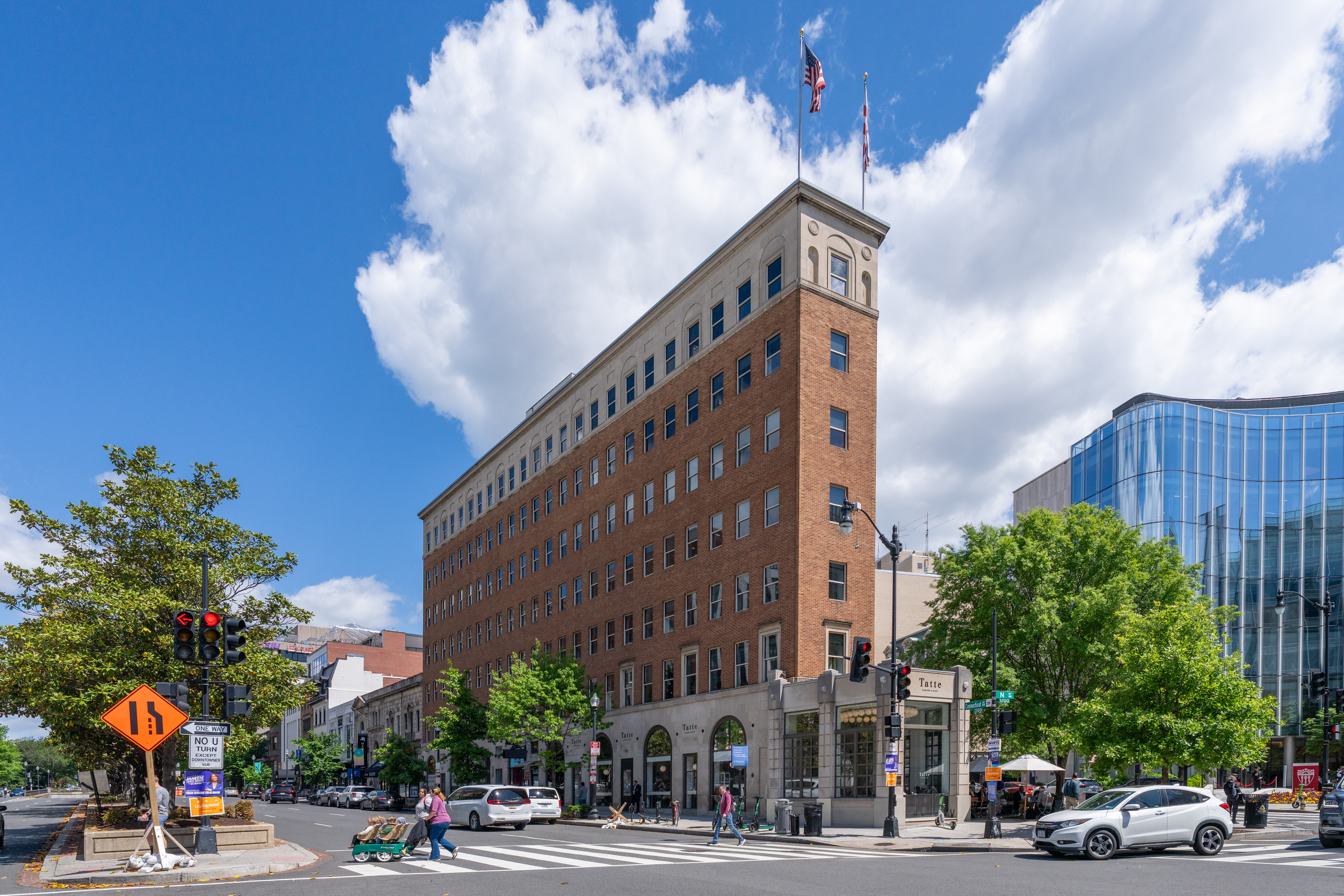
- Headquarters in Washington, D.C.
- Abbreviation: IPS
- Formation: 1963; 63 years ago
- Type: Public policy think tank
- Tax ID no.: 52-0788947
- Headquarters: 1301 Connecticut Avenue NW
- Director: Tope Folarin
- Revenue: $5.56 million (2024)
- Expenses: $5.23 million (2024)
- Website: www.ips-dc.org

The Institute for Policy Studies (IPS) is an American progressive think tank, formed in 1963 and based in Washington, D.C. It was directed by John Cavanagh from 1998 to 2021. In 2021, Tope Folarin assumed the position of executive director. IPS focuses on US foreign policy, domestic policy, human rights, international economics, and national security.

IPS has been described as one of the five major independent think tanks in Washington during its first decades. Members of the IPS played key roles in the civil rights and anti-war movements of the 1960s, in the women's and environmental movements of the 1970s, and in the peace, anti-apartheid, and anti-intervention movements of the 1980s.

== History ==
The IPS has come to be seen as an institutional outgrowth of the New Left movement of the 1960s and 1970s. In 1981, political scholar Joshua Muravchik wrote that its "genius" lay in how it acted "as a bridge between radicalism and the liberal establishment." According to Emory University historian Harvey Klehr, writing in 1988, the IPS served "as an intellectual nerve center for the radical movement." Two decades after its start, co-founder Marcus Raskin commented the IPS "had an extraordinary conceit. We were going to speak truth to power." A 2022 report by the Capital Research Center, "Institute for Policy Studies: The Left's Original Think Tank", stated that the IPS at present "probably doesn't make the shortlist of finalists for most influential left-of-center think tank in the country", compared to the Center for American Progress, the Center on Budget and Policy Priorities, or the Urban Institute, but "if one stretches the timeline back far enough", the IPS can be seen as a member of that group.

=== 1960s ===
The IPS was founded in 1963 by Raskin and Richard Barnet as the think tank for "the most powerful of the powerless". The founders were officials in the John F. Kennedy administration – Raskin, then in his twenties, was working as a White House aide for McGeorge Bundy, and Barnet served in a similar role to John J. McCloy. They had become disillusioned by priorities based on politics rather than moral issues.

Against the backdrop of the counterculture of the 1960s, the opposition to US involvement in the Vietnam War, and the civil rights movement, the IPS "became a brand name for its unabashedly left-wing tone", in contrast with RAND and the largely conservative think tanks. Members of these movements came to IPS headquarters in Washington, D.C.'s Dupont Circle. In a 2009 interview, Raskin said, "Very quickly, with the Vietnam war, the civil rights movement, the women's movement, the institute became a place where different people from the movements came. People came in from demonstrations [and] camped out in the offices."

According to Raskin, "Early on [the IPS] had predicted that Vietnam would be a disaster." During the presidency of Lyndon Johnson, Raskin was indicted by the federal government for the 1965 publication of "tens of thousands of copies of an IPS anti-war Vietnam Reader"—a kind of textbook for anti-war teach-ins. He was charged with encouraging people to resist the draft. In 1967, Raskin and IPS Fellow Arthur Waskow penned "A Call to Resist Illegitimate Authority", a document signed by dozens of scholars and religious leaders which helped to launch the draft resistance movement.

In 1964, several leading black activists joined the institute's staff and made IPS into a base for supporting the civil rights movement. Fellow Bob Moses organized trainings for field organizers of the Student Nonviolent Coordinating Committee on the links between civil rights theory and practice, while Ivanhoe Donaldson initiated an assembly of black government officials. Co-writer of the Port Huron Statement at Students for a Democratic Society (SDS) and civil rights veteran, IPS Fellow Robb Burlage launched the critical health care justice movement in 1967 with his "Burlage Report". The next year, Burlage founded the Health Policy Advisory Center, which began publishing the Health/Pac Bulletin. The Bulletin's broad audience included "radicalized medical students and physicians and neighborhood activists" and "nervous health administrators at powerful medical centers pilloried in each issue"; it became a bimonthly until its closure in 1994.

The IPS was also at the forefront of the feminist movement. Fellow Charlotte Bunch organized a significant women's liberation conference in 1966 and later launched Quest: A Feminist Quarterly, a feminist journal. Rita Mae Brown wrote and published her notable lesbian coming-of-age novel, Rubyfruit Jungle, while on the staff in the 1970s.

IPS also organized congressional seminars and published numerous books that challenged the national security state, including Gar Alperovitz's Atomic Diplomacy and Barnet's Intervention and Revolution. IPS was the object of repeated FBI and Internal Revenue Service probes. The Nixon administration placed Barnet and Raskin on its expanded Enemies List.

=== 1970s ===
In 1971, Raskin received "a mountain of paper" from a source that was later identified as Daniel Ellsberg. These became known as the Pentagon Papers. Raskin played his "customary catalytic role" by putting Ellsberg in touch with New York Times reporter Neil Sheehan.

In 1974, the institute created an Organizing Committee for the Fifth Estate as part of its Center for National Security Studies which published the magazine CounterSpy until 1984. (Note: In the 1980s there were allegations by a confidential Dutch intelligence report that tied the controversial ex-CIA agent, Philip Agee, to the IPS magazine CounterSpy. Agee was the subject of numerous publications including a 1995 book and a 1997 Los Angeles Times article that did not mention any connection between Agee and the IPS magazine.) That year, the Transnational Institute (TNI), a progressive think tank based in Amsterdam, was established as the IPS's international program, later becoming an independent non-profit.

In 1976, agents of Chilean dictator Augusto Pinochet assassinated two IPS staff members on Washington's Embassy Row. The target of the car bomb attack was Orlando Letelier, a former Chilean government minister and ambassador to the United States, one of Pinochet's most outspoken critics and the head of the Transnational Institute. Ronni Karpen Moffitt, a 25-year-old IPS development associate, was also killed. The IPS hosts an annual human rights award in the names of Letelier and Moffitt to honor them while celebrating new heroes of the human rights movement from the US and elsewhere in the Americas. The award recipients receive the Letelier-Moffitt Human Rights Award.

In 1977, IPS created the Government Accountability Project (GAP), a nonprofit whistleblower protection and advocacy organization. According to GAP, it was formed "in response to several whistleblowers, such as Daniel Ellsberg, who came to IPS about White House, FBI and Pentagon scandals".

In its attention to the role of multinational corporations, the IPS was an early critic of what has come to be called globalization. Barnet's 1974 examination of the power of multinational corporations, Global Reach: The Power of the Multinational Corporations (co-written with Ronald E. Muller), appeared even as the concept of multinationals was being academically defined.

=== 1980s ===
In the 1980s, Raskin served as chair of the SANE/Freeze campaign. The IPS also became heavily involved in supporting the movement against US intervention in Central America. IPS Director Robert Borosage and other staff helped draft Changing Course: Blueprint for Peace in Central America and the Caribbean, which was used by hundreds of schools, labor unions, churches, and citizen organizations as a challenge to US policy in the region.

In 1985, Fellow Roger Wilkins helped found the Free South Africa Movement, which organized a year-long series of demonstrations that led to the imposition of US sanctions. In 1987, S. Steven Powell published his non-fiction Covert Cadre: Inside the Institute for Policy Studies, in which he provided "by far the single most compendious collection of facts about IPS that anyone has yet compiled", according to a lengthy critical review by Joshua Muravchik.

In 1986, after six years of the Reagan administration, Sidney Blumenthal noted, "Ironically, as IPS has declined in Washington influence, its stature has grown in conservative demonology. In the Reagan era, the institute has loomed as a right-wing obsession and received most of its publicity by serving as a target." Conservative think tanks American Enterprise Institute and The Heritage Foundation described the IPS as the "far left" or "radical left" of the late 1980s, In a mid-80s essay in the journal World Affairs, author Joshua Muravchik coined "communophilism" – an "eclectic and undisciplined" sympathy to communist movements and governments, "virulently anti capitalist and virulently critical of the capitalist democracies of the West" – to describe the IPS.

In his 1988 book Far Left of Center: The American Radical Left Today, historian Klehr wrote: "[it provides] sustenance and support for a variety of causes, ranging from nuclear and anti-intervention issues to support for Marxist insurgencies. IPS brings together activists and academics and provides a place where they can mingle with congressmen and other policymakers and public figures".

=== 1990s ===
In the early 1990s, the IPS began monitoring the environmental impacts of US trade, investment, and drug policies. In 1994, it published the first annual "Executive Excess" report, examining compensation for top level executives and its impacts.

=== 2000s ===
During the 2000s, the IPS strongly opposed the George W. Bush administration's actions during the "war on terror", and argued against the US invasion of Afghanistan after 9/11.

=== 2010 – present ===
In recent years, the IPS has been critical of US foreign policy in the Middle East, particularly in the Israeli-Palestinian conflict. Currently, its main focus is in five areas: economic inequality, race and gender considerations, climate change, foreign policy, and leadership development.

During the 2020 US election cycle, Bernie Sanders used IPS research in his campaign for the Democratic presidential nomination. A number of his wealth inequality arguments were based on a 2017 IPS research paper. According to The Nation, "Sanders gets some of his sharpest talking points about inequality from the Institute for Policy Studies, a more radical outfit that is usually ignored by the mainstream of the Democratic Party."

== Current projects ==
As of 2024, the IPS supports a number of independent projects, among them: Foreign Policy in Focus, a virtual think tank that seeks "to make the United States a more responsible global partner"; the Global Economy Program, aiming to "speed the transition to an equitable and sustainable economy while reversing today's extreme levels of economic and racial inequality and excessive corporate and Wall Street power"; the National Priorities Project, focused on the US federal budget and spending "that prioritizes peace, economic opportunity, and shared prosperity for all"; the New Internationalism project, working to "end wars and militarism, with a focus on U.S. policy"; and the Program on Inequality and the Common Good, addressing income inequality and "extreme wealth concentration".

== Funding ==
IPS operates as a 501(c)(3) nonprofit. Start-up funding came mostly from the Stern Family Fund (which was in large part endowed by the estate of Sears, Roebuck & Co. chairman Julius Rosenwald). During the 1960s, significant financial supporters included Sears heir, Philip Stern, the Ford Foundation, the D.J. Bernstein Foundation, the EDO Foundation, the Carnegie Corporation of New York, banker James Warburg, and the Field Foundation. During the 1970s and 1980s, much of the funding came from the Samuel Rubin Foundation. In later years, the MacArthur Foundation made significant contributions. In 2018, 59% of revenue came from foundations and 36% from individual donations. In 2022, reported revenue was $5.78 million against $5.37 million in expenses. The IPS bylaws prohibit it from accepting government funding.

== Notable people ==
The 14-member IPS board of trustees in 2024 included actor Danny Glover, Code Pink co-founder Jodie Evans, Ford Foundation vice-president of US Programs Sarita Gupta, and editorial director and publisher of The Nation Katrina vanden Heuvel. Past and current IPS associates include:

=== Fellows ===
- Ajamu Baraka
- Phyllis Bennis
- John Cavanagh
- John Kiriakou
- Saul Landau
- Marcus Raskin
- Frank Smith Jr.

=== Senior scholars ===
- Maude Barlow
- Norman Birnbaum
- Noam Chomsky
- Chuck Collins
- Barbara Ehrenreich
- Richard Falk
- Jerry Mander
- Jack O'Dell
- Vandana Shiva
