= Anatole Shub =

American political writer and journalist (1928–2006)

- Born: May 19, 1928; New York City, U.S.
- Died: July 2, 2006 (aged 78); Washington, D.C., U.S.
- Education: Townsend Harris High School; City College of New York; Medill School of Journalism; Columbia University Graduate School of Journalism
- Occupations: Author; journalist; research; editor; news director; public opinion analyst
- Spouse(s): Joyce Lasky; Barbara Raskin
- Children: 2

Anatole Shub (May 19, 1928 in The Bronx, New York City – July 2, 2006 in Washington, D.C.) was an American author, journalist, researcher, editor, news director and Russian public opinion analyst.

He is the son of journalist and historian David Shub, who immigrated to the United States in 1908.

Shub attended Townsend Harris High School and then joined the US Navy in 1945. He graduated from the City College of New York and attended the Medill School of Journalism at Northwestern University and the Graduate School of Journalism at Columbia University.

His first jobs in journalism included writing and then editing at The New Leader, a leftist but anti-communist magazine whose editor was his brother-in-law, Melvin J. Lasky, and associate editor at Commentary. Next, he was an editor at The New York Times, where he won a fellowship from the Institute of Current World Affairs, which allowed him to travel in the Soviet Union and Eastern Europe.

In 1964, he was hired by The Washington Post to open a bureau in Bonn and report on Germany and Eastern Europe. Next, he was moved to the Moscow bureau, where his reporting on dissidents and the political role of the army got him expelled in 1969.

Later, Shub was news director at Radio Free Europe and analyst for the United States Information Agency, studying Russian public opinion.

Shub was married to Joyce Lasky (sister of Floria Lasky) with whom he had a son and daughter; they later divorced. He then married the author Barbara (née Bellman) Raskin, the former wife of progressive social critic Marcus Raskin and the mother of future congressman Jamie Raskin; the marriage also ended in divorce. His family's involvement in journalism also included his brother Boris Shub, who founded Radio Liberty.

Shub died of a stroke and pneumonia at age 78.

== Selected publications ==
- Shub, Anatole (1989). "De-Leninization" Or "post-Leninism"?: New Soviet Thinking on the Past and Future. U.S. Information Agency, Office of Research.
- Shub, Anatole (1970). The Return of Stalin's Ghost. New York: W.W.Norton.

== Bibliography and References ==
- Martin, Douglas (July 8, 2006). "Anatole Shub, 78, a Researcher and Reporter on Russian Topics, Dies". The New York Times. ISSN 0362-4331.
- Salisbury, Harrison (November 29, 1970). "Stalinism without Stalin". The New York Times. ISSN 0362-4331.

Specific
