= Richard Barnet =

American scholar (1929–2004)

- Born: May 7, 1929
- Died: December 23, 2004 (aged 75); Washington, DC
- Education: Harvard University
- Occupations: Author and scholar
- Spouse: Ann B. Barnet
- Children: Juliana, Beth, Michael, Arthurnell
- Writing career
- Years active: 1961-2004
- Period: 1968-1983
- Subjects: Government and International Relations
- Notable works: Global Reach: The Power of the Multinational Corporation; Roots of War: The Men and Institutions behind U.S. Foreign Policy

Richard Jackson Barnet (May 7, 1929 – December 23, 2004) was an American scholar who co-founded the Institute for Policy Studies.

== Early years ==
Richard Barnet was born in Boston and raised in Brookline, Massachusetts. After attending The Roxbury Latin School, he graduated from Harvard University in 1951 and from Harvard Law School in 1954. After serving two years in the U.S. Army, he worked as a lawyer in Boston. In 1959, and became a fellow at Harvard's Russian Research Center, which was renamed the Davis Center for Russian and Eurasian Studies in 1996.

== Government service ==
After publishing his first book, Who Wants Disarmament? (1960), a study of U.S.-Soviet disarmament negotiations, Barnet joined the State Department in 1961 as an aide to John J. McCloy in the U.S. Arms Control and Disarmament Agency.

== Institute for Policy Studies ==
Disillusioned by his experience of the inner workings of government, Barnet left government service in 1963 to co-found, with Marcus Raskin, the Institute for Policy Studies (IPS). He served as its co-director until 1978, and remained active at the institute he had helped create until his retirement in 1998. IPS was the first influential political think tank, according to Sidney Blumenthal, who said that the structure of IPS served as a model for the ideologically antagonistic Heritage Foundation.

From 1969, Barnet was a member of the Council on Foreign Relations foreign policy organization.

== Author ==
External videos
- Booknotes interview with Barnet on The Rockets' Red Glare: When America Goes to War, the Presidents and the People, March 4, 1990, C-SPAN

Richard Barnet wrote Roots of War (1972), Global Reach: The Power of the Multinational Corporations (1974), one of the first books critical of the effects of what would come to be known as globalization, Lean Years (1980), an account of the environmental movement and Global Dreams (1994), an analysis of some powerful corporations. He also wrote, with his wife, Ann, Youngest Minds: Parenting and Genes in the Development of Intellect and Emotion (1998).

Barnet often contributed to The New Yorker, Harper's, The Nation and Sojourners Magazine, among other publications.

== Personal life ==
Barnet's background was Jewish. As an adult he became a Christian, which influenced his views about war, peace and civil rights. He was a talented violinist, and taught music to children from poor neighborhoods toward the end his life. He and his wife, pediatric neurologist Dr. Ann B. Barnet, had two daughters, Juliana and Beth, and one son, Michael, as well as a foster son, Arthurnell. Richard Barnet died at age 75 on December 23, 2004.

== Works ==
- Intervention and Revolution; the United States in the Third World, 1968
- The Economy of Death, 1969
- Roots of War: The Men and Institutions behind U.S. Foreign Policy, 1972
- Global Reach: The Power of the Multinational Corporations (1974)
- The Giants: Russia and America, 1977
- Real Security: Restoring American Power in a Dangerous Decade, 1981
- The Rockets' Red Glare: when America goes to War : the Presidents and the People, 1990
- The Lean Years: Politics in the Age of Scarcity, 1982
- The Alliance - America, Europe, Japan: Makers of the Postwar World, 1983
