= Dan Kildee =

American politician (born 1958)

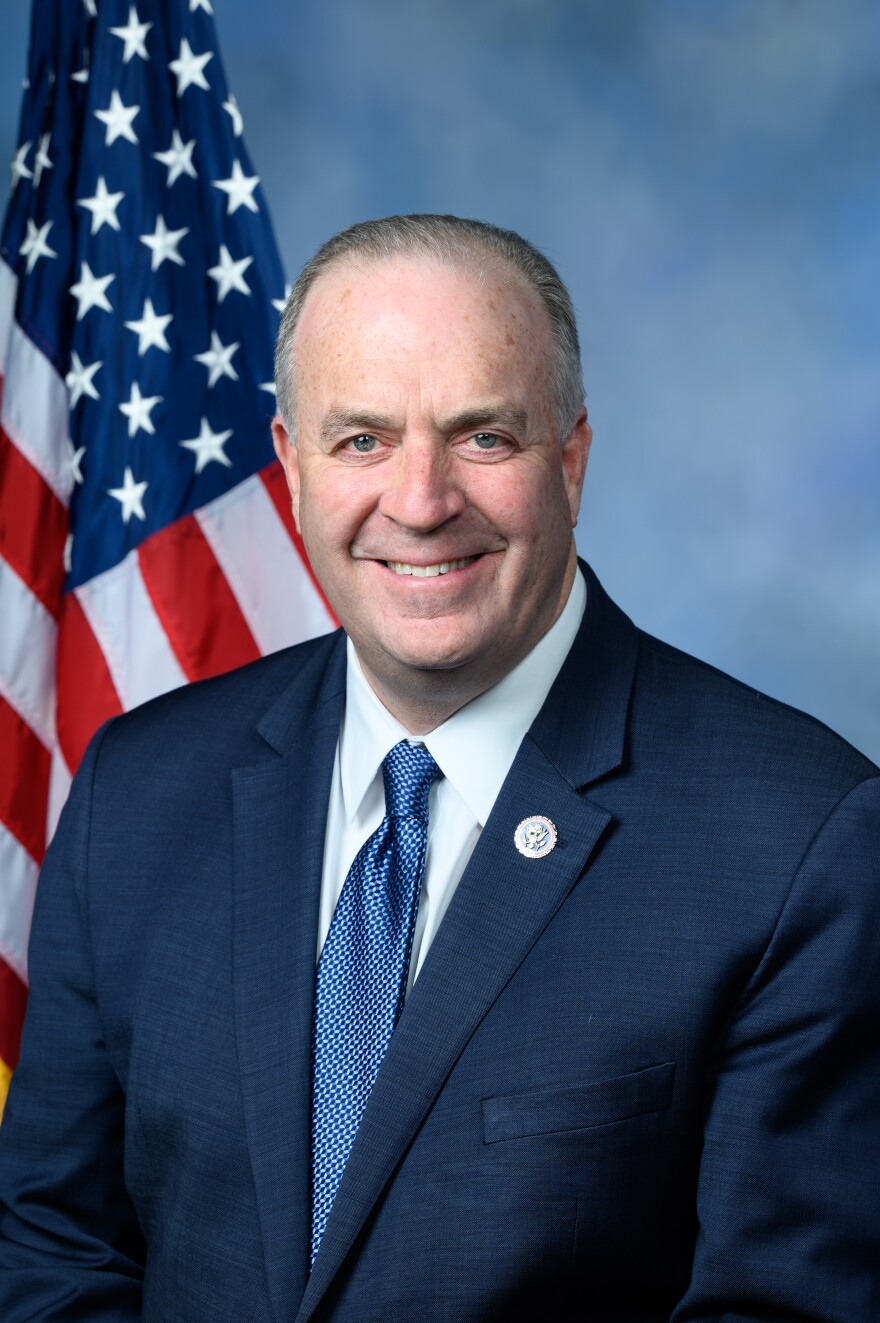
- Official portrait, 2021

Member of the U.S. House of Representatives from Michigan
- In office January 3, 2013 – January 3, 2025
- Preceded by: Dale Kildee
- Succeeded by: Kristen McDonald Rivet
- Constituency: 5th district (2013–2023); 8th district (2023–2025)

Personal details
- Born: Daniel Timothy Kildee; August 11, 1958 (age 67) Flint, Michigan, U.S.
- Party: Democratic
- Spouse: Jennifer Kildee (m. 1988)
- Children: 3
- Relatives: Dale Kildee (uncle)
- Education: University of Michigan, Flint; Central Michigan University (BS)
- Kildee's voice Kildee on a bill to control insulin pricing. Recorded March 31, 2022

Daniel Timothy Kildee (/ˈkɪldiː/; born August 11, 1958) is an American politician who served as a U.S. representative from Michigan from 2013 to 2025. A member of the Democratic Party, he previously served as the Genesee County Treasurer from 1996 to 2013, before succeeding his uncle, Dale Kildee, in Congress. From 1977 to 2009, Kildee was a municipal elected official. On November 16, 2023, he announced he would not seek re-election in 2024.

== Early life and education ==
Kildee was born in Flint, Michigan. He attended Flint Northern High School and Central Michigan University. In 2008, he finished his coursework at CMU, earning a B.S. in community development administration.

== Flint local political career ==
At age 18, Kildee became one of the nation's youngest elected officials when he was elected to the Flint Board of Education in 1977. In 1984, Kildee was elected to serve on Genesee County's board of commissioners. He served on the board for 12 years, including five as chair.

In 1991, Kildee ran for mayor of Flint. He was one of four candidates to challenge incumbent Mayor Matthew Collier in the August 6 nonpartisan primary election. City Councilman Woodrow Stanley finished first with 24% of the vote. Collier ranked second with 23% of the vote, qualifying for the November election. Kildee finished third with 18%. In 1996, Kildee was elected Genesee County Treasurer. He was reelected in 2000, 2004, and 2008. In 2008, he received 72% of the vote.

In 2002, Kildee helped create the Genesee County Land Bank, a Washington D.C.–based nonprofit organization focused on urban decay. The land bank has helped to clean up vacant and abandoned structures in the community. The Genesee County Land Bank was the first community land bank in the U.S. The concept of community land banks has since expanded to other U.S. cities.

In 2009, Kildee co-founded and served as president of the Center for Community Progress, a nonprofit focused on urban revitalization. He resigned as county treasurer to oversee the group.

== U.S. House of Representatives ==
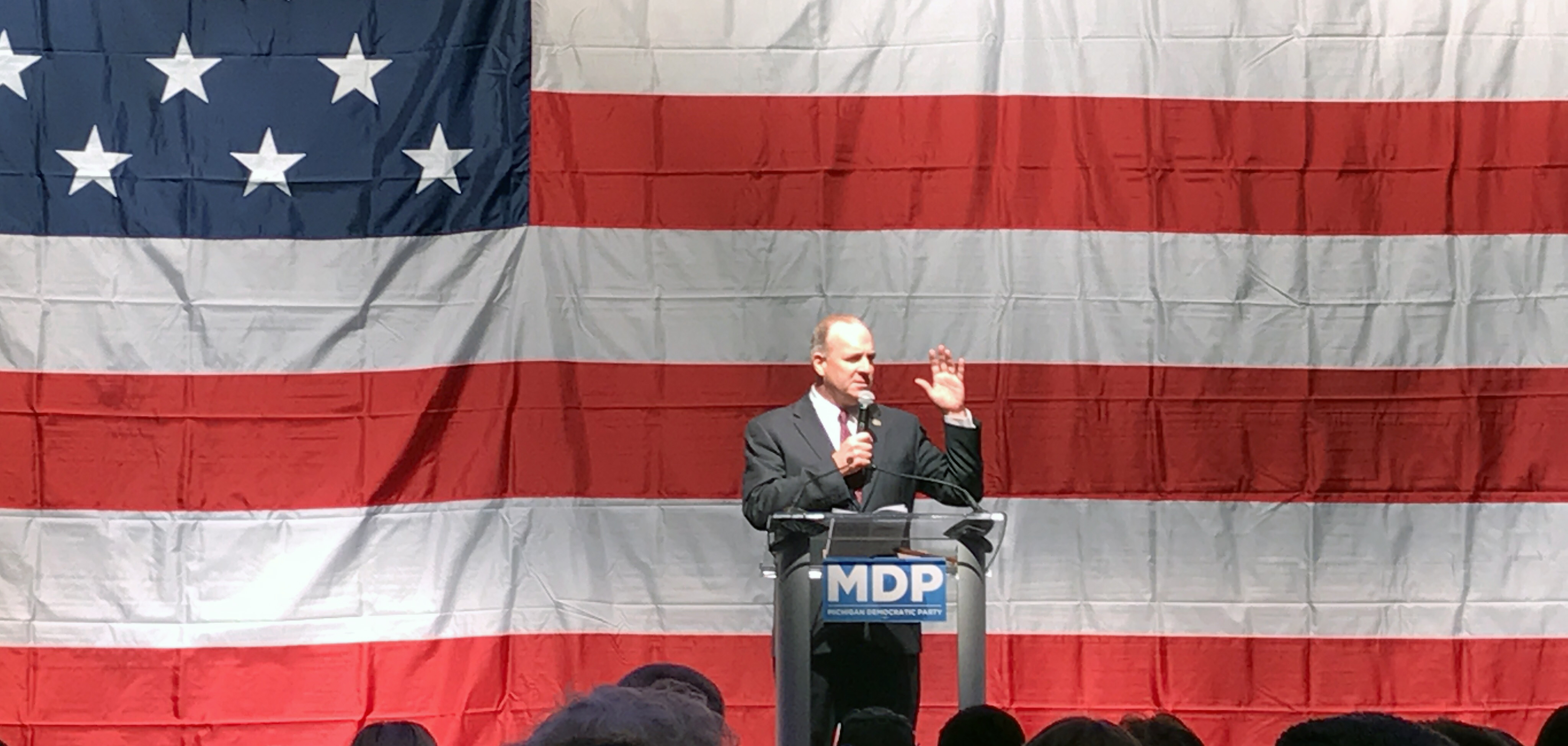
Dan Kildee at the spring 2017 Michigan Democratic Convention

=== 2012 election ===
Kildee's uncle, Dale Kildee, served in the House of Representatives representing Michigan's 5th congressional district. In July 2011, Dale Kildee announced he would retire from Congress. Dan Kildee declared his candidacy for the House on November 1, 2011. He was unchallenged in the Democratic primary. In the November election, he defeated Republican State Representative Jim Slezak, 65% to 31%.

=== Tenure ===
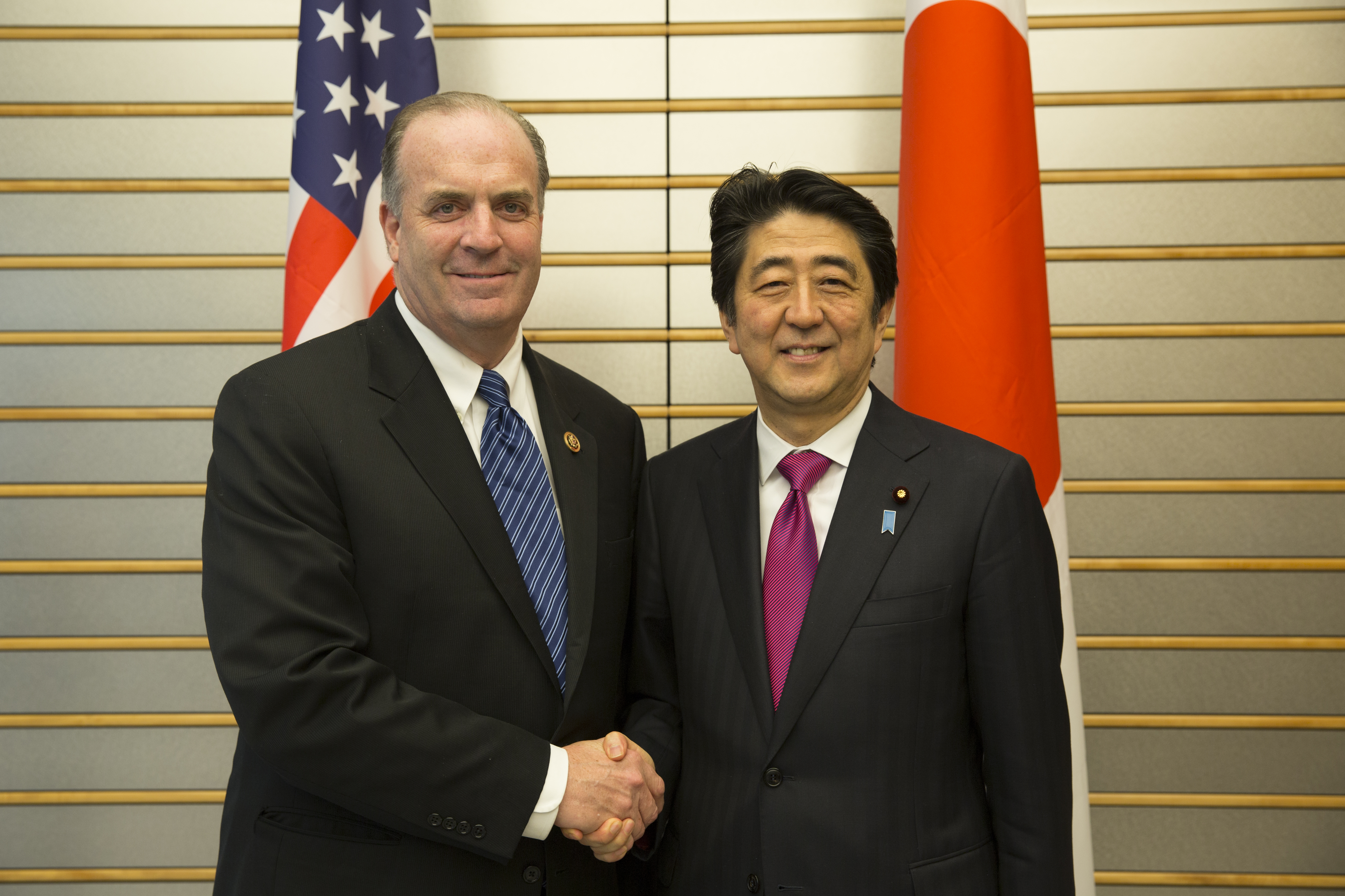
Kildee meets with Prime Minister of Japan Shinzo Abe.

In January 2013, then-House Minority Whip Steny Hoyer appointed Kildee assistant whip. His fellow freshmen Democratic members elected Kildee to serve as their representative to the caucus's Steering and Policy Committee.

In 2019, Kildee helped secure $11.2 million in federal funding to demolish blighted homes in Saginaw. He supported Steny Hoyer's "Make it in America" legislation, which would remove tax breaks for companies that move jobs overseas.

In a September 2016 speech on the U.S. House floor, Kildee claimed that House Republican leaders were refusing to approve emergency aid to Flint because a majority of its residents are Black. Congress passed a funding measure that provided $170 million in aid to communities including Flint that sought infrastructure improvements for their water.

Kildee voted with President Joe Biden's stated position 100% of the time in the 117th Congress, according to a FiveThirtyEight analysis.

=== Political positions ===
==== Gun policy ====
In 2022, Kildee voted for H.R. 1808: Assault Weapons Ban of 2022.

==== Abortion ====
Kildee is a supporter of abortion rights and emphasized the issue during his 2022 reelection race. In September 2022, he hosted a reproductive rights roundtable alongside Representative Sara Jacobs in Midland, Michigan.

==== COVID-19 policy ====
On January 31, 2023, Kildee voted against H.R.497:Freedom for Health Care Workers Act, a bill which would lift COVID-19 vaccine mandates for healthcare workers.

On February 1, 2023, Kildee voted against a resolution to end COVID-19 national emergency.

==== Inflation ====
Kildee voted for the Inflation Reduction Act. Kildee has attributed the rising rates of inflation to the 2022 Russian invasion of Ukraine.

==== Immigration ====
In 2019, Kildee voted for Alexandria Ocasio-Cortez's amendment to H.R. 2500, which would prohibit the president from deploying troops on the southern border to enforce immigration law.

==== Impeachment of Donald Trump ====
Kildee voted to impeach then-president Donald Trump in both 2019 and 2021. On July 27, 2019, he was one of 95 Democrats to vote against the motion to table H. Res. 498, which would table the impeachment inquiry into Trump.

==== Filibuster ====
Kildee has criticized the 60-vote majority Senate rule and compared it to Jim Crow Era laws.

==== Electric vehicles ====
Kildee introduced legislation that included a provision for a $7,500 tax credit for electric vehicle buyers.

==== Private property ====
In 2014, Kildee voted against H.R. 1944: The Private Property Rights Protection Act of 2014, which would have prohibited government use of eminent domain for the purpose of economic development.

==== Religion ====
In April 2018, Kildee, Jared Huffman, Jamie Raskin, and Jerry McNerney launched the Congressional Freethought Caucus. The Freethought Caucus advocates for more non-religious representation in Congress and opposes state promotion of religion.

Kildee supports humanist chaplains and in 2013, Kildee voted against an amendment that would prohibit funds from being used to appoint chaplains without an endorsing agency.

==== Reparations ====
Kildee was a sponsor of H.R. 40, the Commission to Study and Develop Reparation Proposals for African Americans Act. The bill would allow history books to go into more depth on African American struggles and set up a reparations commission for those with enslaved ancestors.

==== Syria ====
In 2013, Kildee voted in favor of intervention and arming the Syrian Opposition against Bashar al-Assad and ISIS.

==== Trade ====
In 2022, Kildee was among the representatives to sign a letter calling on President Joe Biden to lift tariffs on China.

==== Ukraine ====
Kildee had voted in favor of aid to Ukraine.

==== Voting rights ====
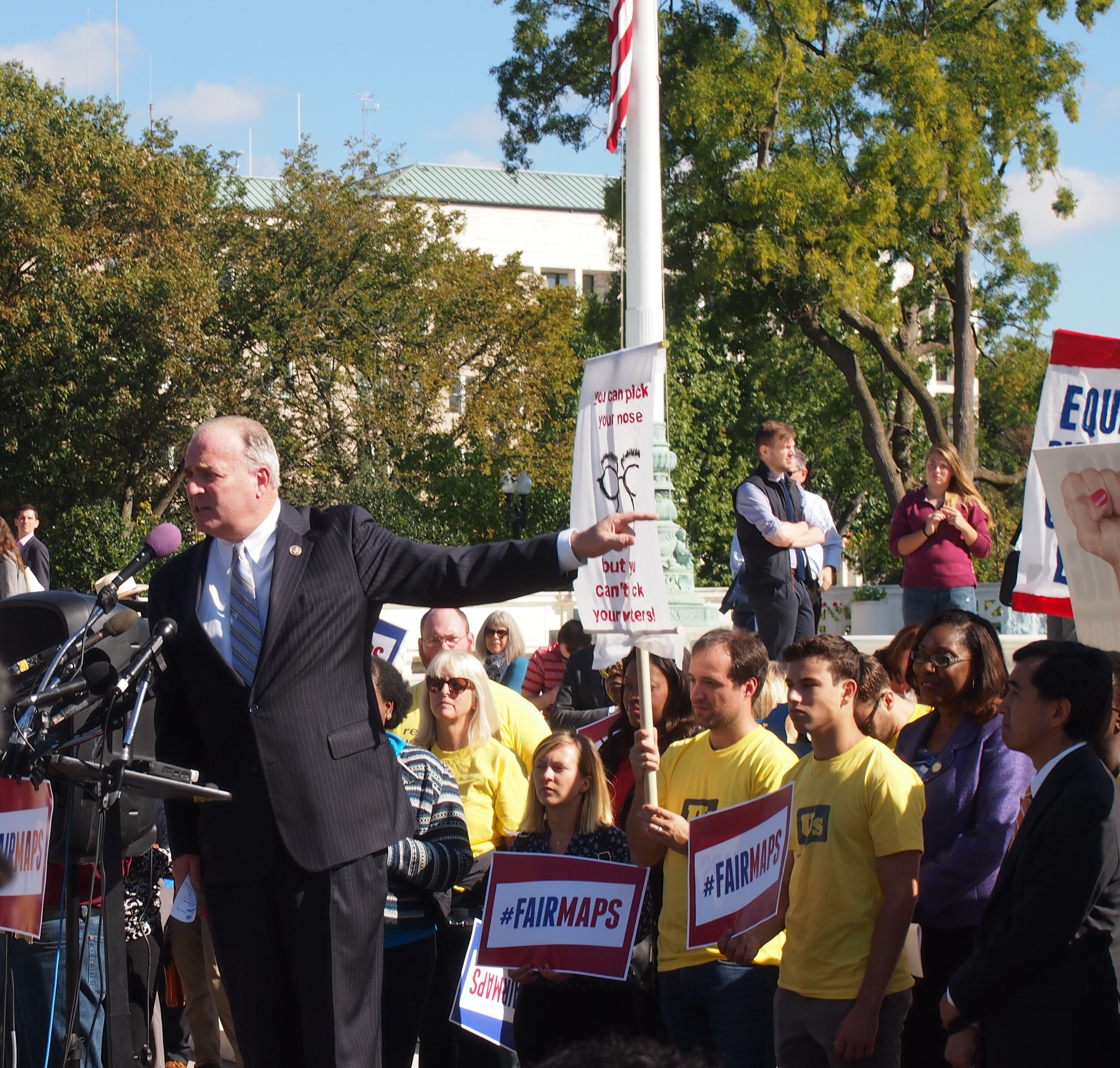
Kildee speaks at a 2017 rally against gerrymandering.

Kildee voted for the Ayanna Pressley amendment to H.R. 1, the Voting Rights Act which would lower the voting age to 16.

On February 9, 2023, Kildee voted against H.J.Res. 24: Disapproving the action of the District of Columbia Council in approving the Local Resident Voting Rights Amendment Act of 2022 which condemns the District of Columbia's plan that would allow noncitizens to vote in local elections.

=== Committee assignments ===
- Committee on Ways and Means
- Committee on the Budget

=== Caucus memberships ===
- Congressional Progressive Caucus
- Afterschool Caucuses
- Congressional Freethought Caucus
- Blue Collar Caucus
- House Pro-Choice Caucus
- Congressional Coalition on Adoption

== Gubernatorial campaigns ==
Kildee was a candidate in the 2010 Michigan gubernatorial election, setting up an exploratory committee and filing to run. He ultimately dropped out of the race. He was also rumored to be considering a run in the 2018 Michigan gubernatorial election, but publicly declared he would not run.

== Personal life ==
Kildee has been married to Jennifer Kildee since 1988. They have three children. His brother Timothy was killed in a shooting in 2024.

On March 31, 2023, Kildee announced that he had been diagnosed with squamous cell carcinoma, saying that a "very small tumor" had been found in one of his tonsils. He said he would undergo surgery and described his prognosis as "excellent".

U.S. House of Representatives
Preceded by Dale Kildee	Member of the U.S. House of Representatives from Michigan's 5th congressional district 2013–2023	Succeeded by Tim Walberg
Preceded by Elissa Slotkin	Member of the U.S. House of Representatives from Michigan's 8th congressional district 2023–2025	Succeeded by Kristen McDonald Rivet
U.S. order of precedence (ceremonial)
Preceded by Candice Miller as Former U.S. Representative	Order of precedence of the United States as Former U.S. Representative	Succeeded by Peter Deutsch as Former U.S. Representative
