= Max Raskin =

American jurist and politician

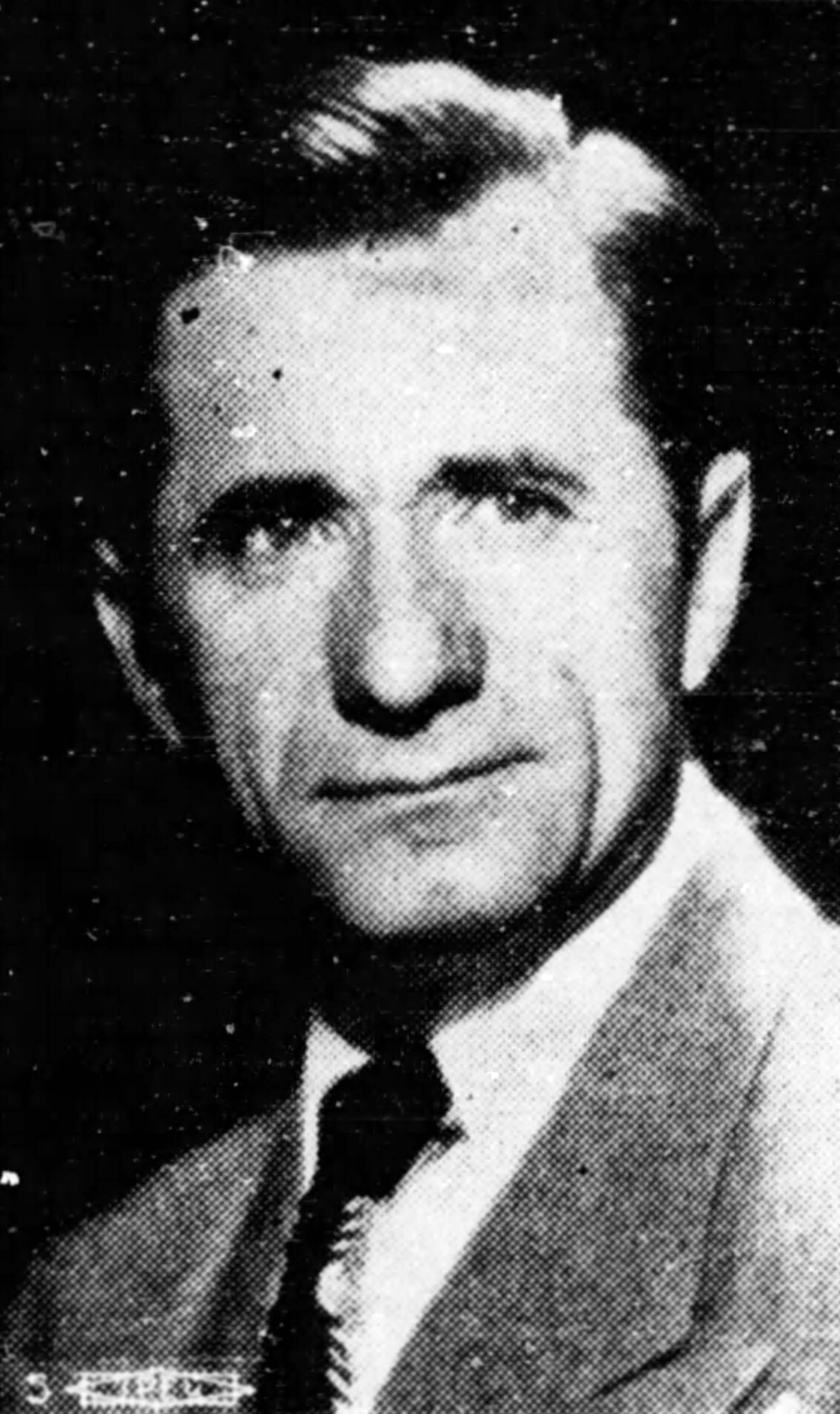
- Raskin c. 1949

Acting Wisconsin Circuit Court Judge for the Waukesha Circuit, Branch 1
- In office August 1, 1978 – December 8, 1980
- Preceded by: William E. Gramling (Disabled)
- Succeeded by: Harry G. Snyder

Acting Wisconsin Circuit Court Judge for the 22nd Circuit, Branch 1
- In office May 1977 – July 31, 1978
- Preceded by: William E. Gramling (Disabled)
- Succeeded by: Circuit abolished

Wisconsin Circuit Court Judge for the 2nd Circuit, Branch 2
- In office October 1963 – August 1973
- Appointed by: John W. Reynolds, Jr.
- Preceded by: Michael T. Sullivan
- Succeeded by: George Burns

City Attorney of Milwaukee
- In office April 1932 – April 1936
- Preceded by: John Niven
- Succeeded by: Walter Mattison

Personal details
- Born: November 8, 1902 Vitebsk, Vitebsk Governorate, Russian Empire
- Died: August 22, 1984 (aged 81) Milwaukee, Wisconsin, U.S.
- Resting place: Spring Hill Cemetery; Milwaukee, Wisconsin
- Party: Socialist (before 1940); Progressive (1940–1944); Democratic (after 1944)
- Spouse(s): Elaine Hilda Rosenblith^{(died 2002)}
- Children: Bonnie Fern (Prager)^{(b. 1935; died 2011)}
- Relatives: Marcus Raskin (nephew); Barbara Raskin (niece in law); Jamie Raskin (grandnephew)
- Education: Marquette Law School

Max Raskin (November 8, 1902 – August 22, 1984) was a Belarusian-born Jewish American lawyer and judge who served as Milwaukee City Attorney from 1932 to 1936 and later as a judge of the Wisconsin Circuit Court from 1963 to 1980.

== Early life ==
Raskin was born to Jewish parents in Vitebsk, a majority-Jewish city in the Russian Empire (in what is now Belarus), and emigrated with his family at the age of nine. He graduated from the Marquette University Law School in 1926 and practiced in Milwaukee as a labor law attorney.

== Political career ==
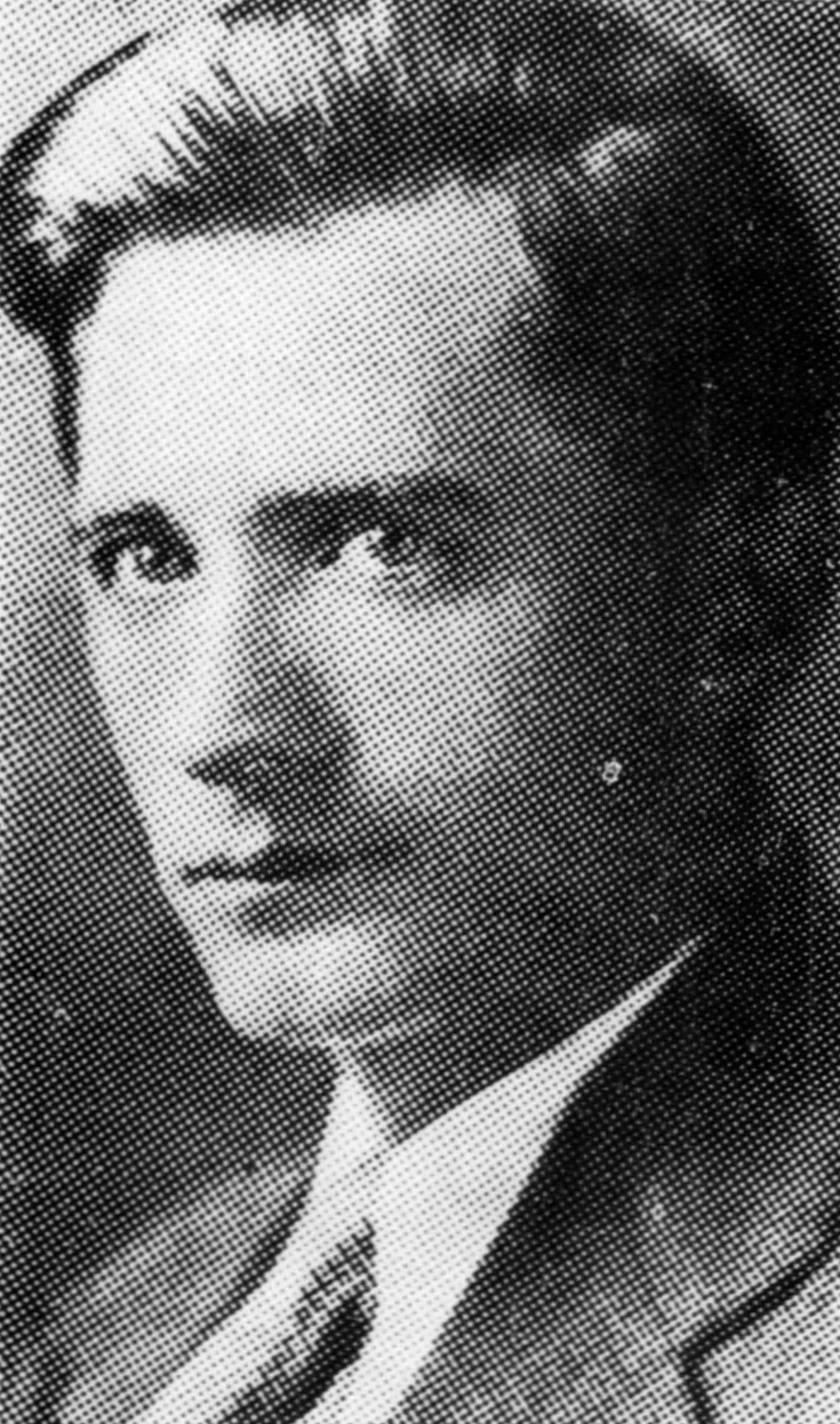
Raskin c. 1933

Raskin ran unsuccessfully for Milwaukee County District Attorney in 1930. In 1932, he was elected Milwaukee City Attorney as a Socialist, unseating nonpartisan incumbent John M. Niven. After his election, Raskin appointed former judge and Socialist state senator William F. Quick as his first assistant and employed Edwin Knappe, a former Socialist state representative, as an assistant city attorney. As city attorney, Raskin collaborated closely with Mayor Daniel W. Hoan, also a Socialist, and required assistant city attorneys to relinquish any employment in private practice. He was harshly criticized by the conservative Milwaukee Sentinel for "his refusal to prosecute communistic rioters".

Raskin was a Wisconsin delegate at the 1932 Socialist National Convention, which was held in Milwaukee.

Raskin was defeated in his 1936 re-election bid, and thereafter reentered private practice. In 1937, he was elected as a national committeeman of the Socialist Party of America but, in 1940, he left the party and joined the Wisconsin Progressive Party. In 1944, he became a Democrat. Raskin ran for judicial office in 1949 and 1956 but was twice defeated; in 1963, his political ally Governor John W. Reynolds, Jr., appointed him to the Milwaukee County Circuit Court. Raskin served on the court until 1973 and, following his mandatory retirement at the age of 70, continued to serve the state as a reserve judge. In that capacity, he stepped in as Acting Circuit Court Judge in Waukesha County for Judge William E. Gramling during a lengthy struggle with cancer. He died in 1984 at the age of 81.

== Personal life ==
Raskin's nephew, Marcus Raskin, was a progressive activist and social critic. His grandnephew is Congressman Jamie Raskin.

Legal offices
Preceded by Michael T. Sullivan	Wisconsin Circuit Court Judge for the 2nd Circuit, Branch 2; 1963 – 1973	Succeeded by George Burns
Preceded by William E. Gramling (Disabled)	Wisconsin Circuit Court Judge for the 22nd Circuit, Branch 1 (Acting); 1977 – 1978	Succeeded by Circuit abolished
Preceded by William E. Gramling (Disabled)	Wisconsin Circuit Court Judge for the Waukesha Circuit, Branch 1 (Acting); 1978 – 1980	Succeeded by Harry G. Snyder
