= Marcus Raskin =

American social critic (1934–2017)

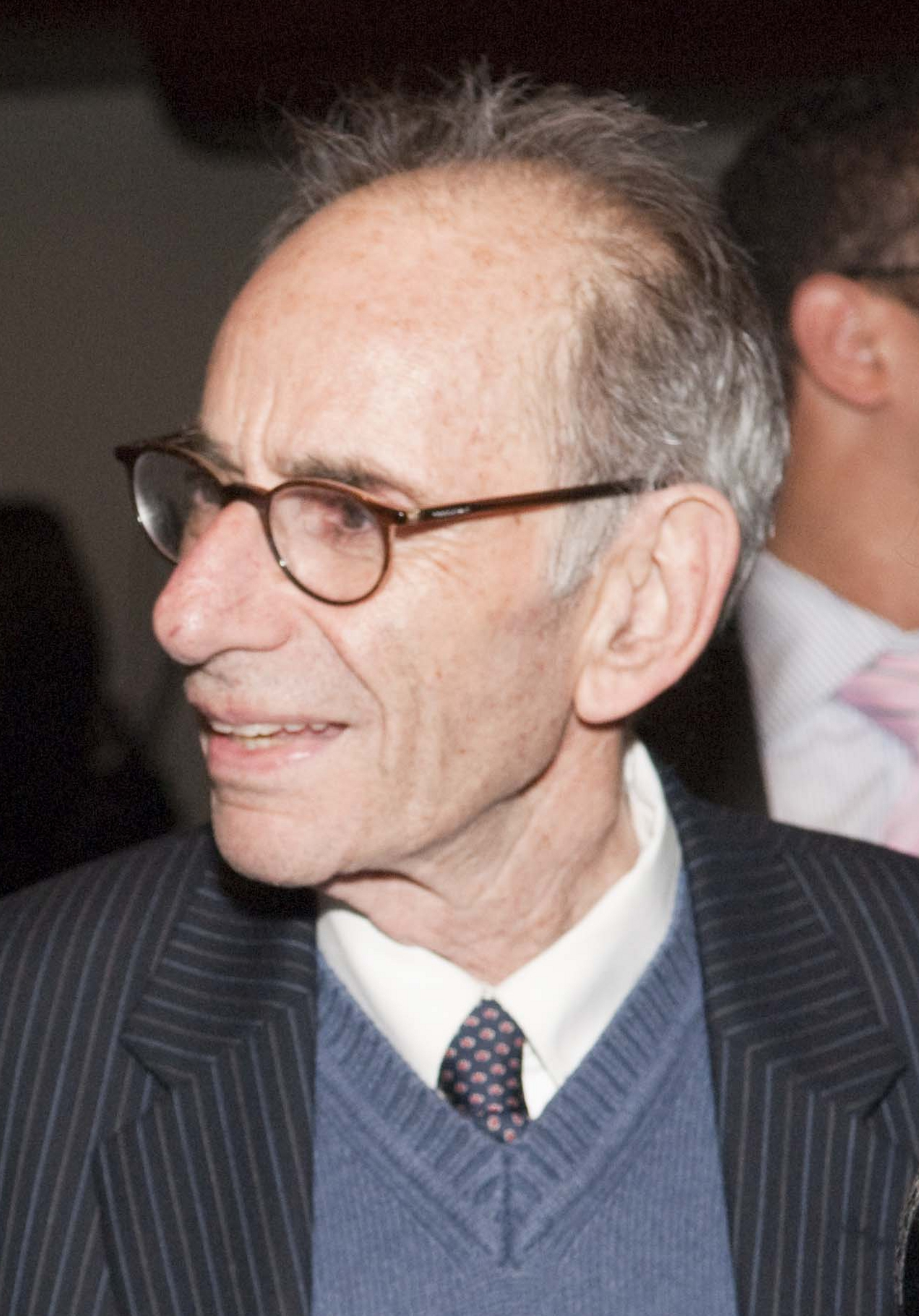
- Born: Marcus Goodman Raskin; April 30, 1934; Milwaukee, Wisconsin, U.S.
- Died: December 24, 2017 (aged 83); Washington, D.C., U.S.
- Education: Juilliard School; University of Chicago (BA, JD)
- Occupations: Social critic, political activist, author, philosopher
- Known for: Institute for Policy Studies co-founder
- Spouse(s): Barbara Bellman (divorced); Lynn Randels
- Children: 4, including Jamie
- Relatives: Max Raskin (uncle)

Marcus Goodman Raskin (April 30, 1934 – December 24, 2017) was an American progressive social critic, political activist, author, and philosopher. He was the co-founder, with Richard Barnet, of the progressive think tank the Institute for Policy Studies in Washington, D.C. He was also a professor of public policy at The George Washington University's School of Public Policy and Public Administration.

== Early life and education ==
Raskin was born in Milwaukee, the second son of Russian Jewish immigrants. His parents, Ben Raskin and Anna Goodman Raskin, owned a plumbing store in Milwaukee, where his father worked as a master plumbing contractor. At the age of 16, Raskin left home to study piano performance at the Juilliard School under Rosina Lhévinne and Lee Thompson. He abandoned a piano career to study at the University of Chicago. Raskin studied under Rexford Guy Tugwell, an economist and member of FDR's Brain Trust, and Quincy Wright, a legal scholar for whom Raskin served as an assistant during his law school years. He graduated from the University of Chicago with a Bachelor of Arts in liberal arts in 1954 and from the University of Chicago Law School with a J.D. degree in 1957.

== Career ==
=== Government service ===
Raskin moved to Washington, D.C. in 1958, where he became a legislative counsel to a group of liberal congressmen, including Democrats Robert Kastenmeier from Wisconsin and James Roosevelt from California, the oldest son of Franklin D. Roosevelt. Raskin soon became the secretary for the Liberal Project, a group of House liberals, organized by Kastenmeier and Roosevelt into a liberal leadership group. As the secretary, Raskin linked the House members with notable intellectuals, including sociologist David Riesman, historian H. Stuart Hughes, and former finance advisor to Franklin D. Roosevelt, James Warburg.

In 1961, Raskin became McGeorge Bundy's assistant on national security affairs and disarmament as a member of the Special Staff of the National Security Council. In 1962, he was a member of the U.S. delegation to an 18-nation disarmament conference in Geneva.

Tensions with Bundy led to Raskin's reassignment in the Bureau of the Budget (now the Office of Management and Budget), where he continued his service on the Presidential Panel on Education. On the panel, Raskin wrote papers on the consequences of technology and the need for democratic education and scientific research.

=== The Institute for Policy Studies ===
In 1963, Raskin left government service, and with Richard Barnet, a State Department official in the Arms Control and Disarmament Agency, created an independent institution, outside of government, to critique official policy.

Much of Raskin's initial work with IPS focused on opposing the Vietnam War. He co-authored the Vietnam Reader with Bernard Fall in 1965, which was used in teach-ins across the country. In 1967, he co-authored with Arthur Waskow, a colleague at the institute, "A Call to Resist Illegitimate Authority", which urged support for those who resisted the draft and the Vietnam War. The "Call to Resist" was signed by thousands of people, and because of it, Raskin and Waskow took part in turning in a thousand draft cards to the Department of Justice. In 1968, Raskin was indicted -— along with William Sloane Coffin, Dr. Benjamin Spock, Michael Ferber, and Mitchell Goodman—for conspiracy to aid resistance to the draft. The group became known as the "Boston Five". In the case, Telford Taylor, prosecutor at the Nuremberg Trials, served as the defense attorney for Raskin. Not long after his acquittal, Raskin published the book Washington Plans an Aggressive War with Barnet and Ralph Stavins. These two books would begin Raskin's critique of the "national security state", a term he coined that he would continue to assess in future works.

With the publication of his book Being & Doing in 1971, Raskin advocated the theory of "social reconstruction." Raskin's thinking was largely influenced by the work of American pragmatist John Dewey, French existentialist Jean-Paul Sartre, and the politics of the New Left. According to Library Journal, Raskin "foresees a peaceful process of non-Marxist reconstruction that will replace authoritarianism and the status quo with politics of the people and a redefined social ethic."

In 1971, Raskin received from Daniel Ellsberg, documents that became known as the Pentagon Papers. Raskin put Ellsberg in touch with New York Times reporter Neil Sheehan, whom Ellsberg had first met in Vietnam.

In 1977, after conducting a first study of the budget and its spending priorities, 56 members of Congress, led by Congressional Black Caucus Dean John Conyers, requested that IPS undertake a deeper analysis of the federal budget. Raskin directed the project, which led to the publication of the 1978 book The Federal Budget and Social Reconstruction. In the 1980s, Raskin became a leader in the anti-nuclear movement as the Chair of the SANE / Freeze campaign. He also worked with labor leaders to organize the Progressive Alliance, a coalition of 16 labor unions and 100 public interest groups that laid out a progressive alternative political agenda.

Raskin served as a Distinguished Fellow of the Institute for Policy Studies, in addition to teaching at George Washington University's School of Public Policy and Public Administration and serving on the editorial board of The Nation magazine. He also advised the Congressional Progressive Caucus and conceptualized the network of local elected officials that evolved into the Institute for Policy Studies' Cities for Peace project, which has coordinated hundreds of city council resolutions against the Iraq War.

Raskin's most recent scholarship included serving as the editor of a series of books laying out how to achieve peace and justice for the think tank's Paths for the 21st Century. This project aimed to generate ideas and proposals, across disciplinary lines and founded upon Raskin's notion of "reconstructive knowledge", which catalyze citizen action and help other scholars and activists pursue a progressive basis for a new society.

== Personal life ==
Raskin was married twice. In 1957, he married author Barbara Bellman of Minneapolis. They had three children: Erika, Jamie and Noah. They divorced in 1980. Barbara went on to write the novel "Hot Flashes" and later married author Anatole Shub. He resided in Washington, D.C. with his wife, Lynn Randels Raskin with whom he had one child, Eden. He also had nine grandchildren. Raskin continued his passion for classical music, releasing his first piano recording, Elegy for the End of the Cold War in 2004. He died at the age of 83 on December 24, 2017, from a heart ailment.

Raskin was the nephew of Max Raskin, a Milwaukee politician who later served as a state judge.

== Books ==
- (1962) The Limits of Defense, with Arthur Waskow
- (1965) The Viet-Nam Reader: Articles and Documents on American Foreign Policy and the Viet-Nam Crisis, edited with Bernard B. Fall
- (1965) A Citizen's White Paper on American Policy in Vietnam and Southeast Asia
- (1965) After 20 Years: Alternatives to the Cold War in Europe, with Richard J. Barnet
- (1971) Being and Doing: An Inquiry Into the Colonization, Decolonization and Reconstruction of American Society and Its State
- (1971) Washington Plans An Aggressive War, with Ralph L. Stavins and Richard J. Barnet
- (1971) An American Manifesto, with Richard Barnet
- (1974) Notes on the Old System: To Transform American Politics
- (1975) The American Political Deadlock: Colloquium on Latin America and the United States: Present and Future of their Economic and Political Relations
- (1976) Next Steps for a New Administration
- (1978) The Federal Budget and Social Reconstruction: The People and the State
- (1979) The Politics of National Security
- (1986) The Common Good: Its Politics, Policies, and Philosophy
- (1987) New Ways of Knowing: The Sciences, Society, and Reconstructive Knowledge, with Herbert J. Bernstein
- (1988) Winning America: Ideas and Leadership for the 1990s, with Chester Hartman
- (1991) Essays of a Citizen: From National Security State to Democracy
- (1992) Abolishing the War System: The Disarmament and International Law Project of the Institute for Policy Studies and the Lawyers Committee on Nuclear Policy
- (1995) Visions and Revisions: Reflections on Culture and Democracy at the End of the Century
- (1997) Presidential Disrespect: From Thomas Paine to Rush Limbaugh – How and Why We Insult, Scorn and Ridicule Our Chief Executives, with Sushila Nayak
- (2003) Liberalism: The Genius of American Ideals
- (2005) In Democracy's Shadow: The Secret World of National Security, with Carl LeVan
- (2007) The Four Freedoms Under Siege: The Clear and Present Danger from Our National Security State, with Robert Spero

== Legacy ==
A collection of personal and professional papers related to Raskin is maintained by the Special Collections Research Center of George Washington University. The collection includes correspondence, biographical information, essays, lecture notes, and materials related to the Institute for Policy Studies. The materials date from 1949 to 2013.

== See also ==
- List of peace activists
