= The Cares Family =

- Founded: 2011
- Founder: Alex Smith
- Dissolved: 2023
- Purpose: bringing older and younger people together to reduce loneliness and intergenerational polarisation
- Website: www.thecaresfamily.org.uk

The Cares Family was a group of charities which operated in the UK from 2011 to 2023. The organisation brought older and younger people together to reduce loneliness and intergenerational polarisation in London, Manchester and Liverpool. It also shared its approach with communities across the UK, raised awareness of the impact of loneliness, and advocated for government action.

The Cares Family was one of a number of initiatives credited for leading action on Britain's 'loneliness epidemic' which the former UK prime minister, Theresa May, said was 'one of the greatest public health challenges of our time.'

== Founding and launch ==
The Cares Family was inspired by a chance meeting between its founder, Alex Smith, and an older neighbour, Fred, on May 6, 2010. Smith was canvassing for votes in a local election when he met Fred, who had not left his home for three months. Smith wheeled his neighbour to the voting place, returned the next day to take him for a haircut, and the two developed a friendship that helped both feel more connected in their local communities. This friendship led to the creation by Smith of the first local charity in The Cares Family group, North London Cares.

== Closing ==
The group ceased operating in November 2023, due to difficulty fundraising, unanticipated tax liabilities, and an insufficiently resilient budget. Staff were told of the immediate closure of the charity and the loss of their jobs on a hastily arranged Microsoft Teams call on October 31 2023, with most leaving the charity that same day. Staff have since written to The Charity Commission to ask for an investigation into the causes of the charity's closure. A full explanation for the closure has yet to be given to ex-staff, and no pay for notice periods has been given.
