= Sarita Gupta =

American social justice activist

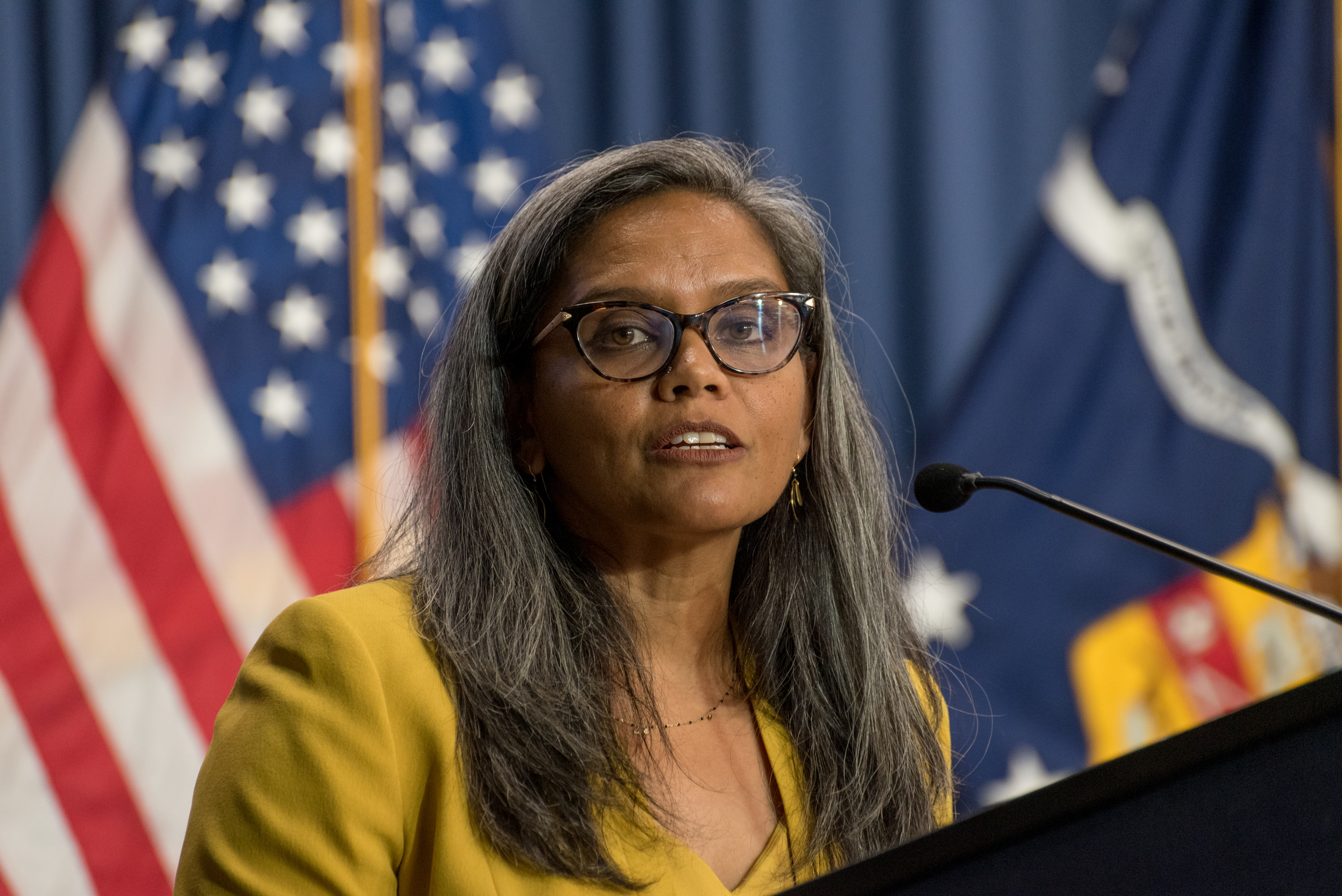

Sarita Gupta (born c. 1975) is a British-American social justice activist and vice president of US Programs at the Ford Foundation. Her career has focused on workers' rights and human rights. She joined the Ford Foundation in 2019, initially as director of its Future of Work(ers) program. Prior to that, Gupta served for 20 years in various leadership roles at Jobs With Justice, including as executive director from 2007. During that period, she also co-founded and served as co-director of Caring Across Generations.

== Early life and education ==
Gupta was born in the United Kingdom and immigrated to the United States. She grew up in Rochester, New York, graduating from The Harley School there in 1992. She earned a bachelor's degree (BA) from Mount Holyoke College in 1996, with studies in women, health, and society.

== Career ==
After graduation, Gupta was elected vice president of the United States Student Association (USSA), then served as president in 1997–1998.

From USSA, she joined Jobs With Justice (JWJ), a national labor rights organization, as executive director of Chicago operations. From 2002 to 2007, she moved to the role of national field organizer, then national field director. In 2007, she became JWJ's executive director. JWJ worked closely in the US to help build the Asia Floor Wage Alliance, a coalition for collective bargaining in the global garment industry, founded in Asia in 2007.

In 2011, Gupta and Ai-jen Poo co-founded Caring Across Generations (CAG), a national coalition of caregivers and care recipients with a mission "to change our culture and policy in America to value and support caregiving".

In 2019, Gupta resigned from JWJ and CAG to work at the Ford Foundation. From 2021 to 2022, she served as the Wayne Morse Chair of Law and Politics, established in honor of the late former Senator, at the University of Oregon.

== Public speaking and media ==
Gupta has maintained a public profile with speaking engagements and media appearances over the decades. In 1996, at 21 she was the youngest member on a panel on mobilizing women at the first Feminist Expo in Washington, DC. In 2002, she was a guest speaker at the Young Communist League (YCL) 7th National Convention. In 2016, she testified before the US Senate Committee on Small Business and Entrepreneurship. She spoke in 2018 at the Aspen Institute on "The Justice System and Jobs: How Court Decisions Are Shaping Americans’ Work Lives". She appeared on a number of panels and in events sponsored by the Obama administration. Gupta has appeared in various media, including MSNBC, Al Jazeera America, PBS, CNBC, and Fox News, and written for the Huffington Post and The Hill, and been featured in The Wall Street Journal, Bloomberg, and Politico.

== Personal life ==
Gupta lives with her husband, Eddie Acosta, and daughter in Silver Spring, Maryland. She practices yoga and coaches her daughter's soccer team.
