= Elizabeth Shub =

Children's book writer, editor, and translator

Elizabeth Shub (1915 – June 18, 2004) was an American children's book writer, editor, and translator from German and Yiddish.

== Biography ==
Elizabeth Shub was born in Poland. Her family emigrated to the United States in 1919. Her father, Shmuel Charney, was a literary critic. Her husband, Boris Shub (1912–1965), was a writer and pioneer in radio broadcasting to Communist countries; he was one of the key organizers of Radio Liberty.

Of note is her collaboration with Isaac Bashevis Singer, with whom she translated many of his stories. In fact, she was the one who suggested Singer write children's stories, and the first one was Zlateh the Goat and Other Stories (1966). She was also likely one of the first people to help Singer learn English.

== Books by Elizabeth Shub ==
- Clever Kate, 1973
- Seeing Is Believing, Greenwillow (New York, NY), 1979 (1979 American Library Association (ALA) Notable Book citation)
- The White Stallion, Greenwillow (New York, NY), 1982 (1982 Best Book award, School Library Journal, and ALA notable book citation)
- Cutlass in the Snow, Greenwillow (New York, NY), 1986 (1986 Child Study Association Children's Book of the Year award)
- Henrietta Szold: The Children's Friend, 1961; 2013
