= United States House Education Subcommittee on Higher Education and Workforce Development =

Standing subcommittee in the United States House of Representatives

Subcommittee of Committee on Education and Workforce
- Active United States House of Representatives; 119th Congress

Leadership
- Chair: Burgess Owens (R)
- Ranking Member: Alma Adams (D)

Structure
- Seats: 22 (22 currently filled) 12/12 10/10
- Political parties: Majority (12): Republican (11); Independent (1); Minority (10): Democratic (10)

Meeting place
- 2176, Rayburn House Office Building; Washington, D.C. 20515

Phone number
- (202)-225-4527

The House Subcommittee on Higher Education and Workforce Investment is a standing subcommittee within the United States House Committee on Education and the Workforce. It was formerly known as the Subcommittee on 21st Century Competitiveness.

== Jurisdiction ==
The Subcommittee's jurisdiction includes:

Education and workforce development beyond the high school level, including but not limited to: higher education generally, postsecondary student assistance and employment services, the Higher Education Act, including: campus safety and climate; adult education; postsecondary career and technical education, apprenticeship programs, and workforce development, including but not limited: to the Workforce Innovation and Opportunity Act, vocational rehabilitation, and workforce development programs from immigration fees; programs related to the arts and humanities, museum and library services, and arts and artifacts indemnity; science and technology programs; and domestic volunteer programs and national service programs, including the Corporation for National and Community Service.

== Members, 119th Congress ==
Majority	Minority
Burgess Owens, Utah, Chair; Michael Baumgartner, Washington, Vice Chair; Joe Wilson, South Carolina; Virginia Foxx, North Carolina; Glenn Thompson, Pennsylvania; Glenn Grothman, Wisconsin; Elise Stefanik, New York; Lisa McClain, Michigan; Kevin Kiley, California (until March 18, 2026); Erin Houchin, Indiana; Bob Onder, Missouri; Mark Harris, North Carolina	Alma Adams, North Carolina, Ranking Member; Frederica Wilson, Florida; Mark Takano, California; Lucy McBath, Georgia; Raúl Grijalva, Arizona (until March 13, 2025); Joe Courtney, Connecticut; Suzanne Bonamici, Oregon; Mark DeSaulnier, California; Ilhan Omar, Minnesota; Adelita Grijalva, Arizona (from November 19, 2025)
Ex officio
Tim Walberg, Michigan	Bobby Scott, Virginia

== Historical membership rosters ==
=== 115th Congress ===
Majority	Minority
Brett Guthrie, Kentucky, Chairman; Glenn Thompson, Pennsylvania; Lou Barletta, Pennsylvania; Luke Messer, Indiana; Bradley Byrne, Alabama; Glenn Grothman, Wisconsin; Elise Stefanik, New York; Rick Allen, Georgia; Jason Lewis, Minnesota; Paul Mitchell, Michigan; Tom Garrett Jr., Virginia; Lloyd Smucker, Pennsylvania; Ron Estes, Kansas	Susan Davis, California, Ranking Member; Joe Courtney, Connecticut; Alma Adams, North Carolina; Mark DeSaulnier, California; Raja Krishnamoorthi, Illinois; Jared Polis, Colorado; Gregorio Sablan, Northern Mariana Islands; Mark Takano, California; Lisa Blunt Rochester, Delaware; Adriano Espaillat, New York
Ex officio
Virginia Foxx, North Carolina	Bobby Scott, Virginia

=== 116th Congress ===
Majority	Minority
Susan Davis, California, Chair; Raul Grijalva, Arizona; Joe Courtney, Connecticut; Gregorio Sablan, Northern Mariana Islands; Suzanne Bonamici, Oregon; Mark Takano, California; Alma Adams, North Carolina; Donald Norcross, New Jersey; Pramila Jayapal, Washington; Josh Harder, California; Andy Levin, Michigan; Ilhan Omar, Minnesota; David Trone, Maryland; Susie Lee, Nevada; Joaquin Castro, Texas; Lori Trahan, Massachusetts	Lloyd Smucker, Pennsylvania, Ranking Member; Brett Guthrie, Kentucky; Glenn Grothman, Wisconsin; Elise Stefanik, New York; Jim Banks, Indiana; Mark Walker, North Carolina; James Comer, Kentucky; Ben Cline, Virginia; Russ Fulcher, Idaho; Steve Watkins, Kansas; Dan Meuser, Pennsylvania; William Timmons, South Carolina
Ex officio
Bobby Scott, Virginia	Virginia Foxx, North Carolina

=== 117th Congress ===
Majority	Minority
Frederica Wilson, Florida, Chair; Mark Takano, California; Pramila Jayapal, Washington; Ilhan Omar, Minnesota; Teresa Leger Fernandez, New Mexico; Mondaire Jones, New York; Kathy Manning, North Carolina; Jamaal Bowman, New York; Mark Pocan, Wisconsin; Joaquin Castro, Texas; Mikie Sherrill, New Jersey; Adriano Espaillat, New York; Raúl Grijalva, Arizona; Joe Courtney, Connecticut; Suzanne Bonamici, Oregon	Greg Murphy, North Carolina, Ranking Member; Glenn Grothman, Wisconsin; Elise Stefanik, New York; Jim Banks, Indiana; James Comer, Kentucky; Russ Fulcher, Idaho; Mariannette Miller-Meeks, Iowa; Bob Good, Virginia; Lisa McClain, Michigan; Diana Harshbarger, Tennessee; Victoria Spartz, Indiana; Vacancy
Ex officio
Bobby Scott, Virginia	Virginia Foxx, North Carolina

=== 118th Congress ===
Majority	Minority
Burgess Owens, Utah, Chair; Glenn Thompson, Pennsylvania; Glenn Grothman, Wisconsin; Elise Stefanik, New York; Jim Banks, Indiana; Lloyd Smucker, Pennsylvania; Bob Good, Virginia; Nathaniel Moran, Texas; John James, Michigan; Lori Chavez-DeRemer, Oregon; Erin Houchin, Indiana; Brandon Williams, New York	Frederica Wilson, Florida, Ranking Member; Mark Takano, California; Pramila Jayapal, Washington; Teresa Leger Fernandez, New Mexico; Kathy Manning, North Carolina; Lucy McBath, Georgia; Raúl Grijalva, Arizona; Gregorio Sablan, Northern Mariana Islands; Joe Courtney, Connecticut; Suzanne Bonamici, Oregon; Alma Adams, North Carolina
Ex officio
Virginia Foxx, North Carolina	Bobby Scott, Virginia
