= United States House Education Subcommittee on Early Childhood, Elementary, and Secondary Education =

Subcommittee of Committee on Education and Workforce
- Active United States House of Representatives; 119th Congress

Leadership
- Chair: Kevin Kiley (I)
- Ranking Member: Suzanne Bonamici (D)

Structure
- Seats: 16 (16 currently filled) 9/9 7/7
- Political parties: Majority (9): Republican (8); Independent (1); Minority (7): Democratic (7)

Meeting place
- 2176, Rayburn House Office Building; Washington, D.C. 20515

Phone number
- (202)-225-4527

The House Subcommittee on Early Childhood, Elementary and Secondary Education is a standing subcommittee within the United States House Committee on Education and the Workforce. It was formerly known as the Subcommittee on Education Reform.

The Chair of the subcommittee is Gregorio Sablan of Northern Mariana Islands, and the Ranking Member is Burgess Owens of Utah.

== Jurisdiction ==
From the Official Subcommittee website:

"Education from early learning through the high school level, including but not limited to early care and education programs such as the Head Start Act and the Child Care and Development Block Grant Act, special education, and homeless and migrant education; overseas dependent schools; career and technical education; school climate and safety, including alcohol and drug abuse prevention; educational equity, including facilities; educational research and improvement, including the Institute of Education Sciences; and pre-service and in-service teacher professional development, including Title II of the Elementary and Secondary Education Act and Title II of the Higher Education Act"

== Members, 119th Congress ==
Majority	Minority
Kevin Kiley, California, Chair (until March 18, 2026); Mary Miller, Illinois, Vice Chair; Virginia Foxx, North Carolina; Glenn Thompson, Pennsylvania; Burgess Owens, Utah; Michael Rulli, Ohio; Ryan Mackenzie, Pennsylvania; Mark Harris, North Carolina; Mark Messmer, Indiana	Suzanne Bonamici, Oregon, Ranking Member; Raúl Grijalva, Arizona (until March 13, 2025); Jahana Hayes, Connecticut; Summer Lee, Pennsylvania; John Mannion, New York; Frederica Wilson, Florida; Alma Adams, North Carolina; Adelita Grijalva, Arizona (from November 19, 2025)
Ex officio
Tim Walberg, Michigan	Bobby Scott, Virginia

== Historical membership rosters ==
=== 115th Congress ===
Majority	Minority
Todd Rokita, Indiana, Chairman; Duncan D. Hunter, California; Phil Roe, Tennessee; Glenn Thompson, Pennsylvania; Luke Messer, Indiana; Dave Brat, Virginia; Tom Garrett Jr., Virginia	Jared Polis, Colorado, Ranking Member; Raúl Grijalva, Arizona; Marcia Fudge, Ohio; Suzanne Bonamici, Oregon; Frederica Wilson, Florida
Ex officio
Virginia Foxx, North Carolina	Bobby Scott, Virginia

=== 116th Congress ===
Majority	Minority
Gregorio Sablan, Northern Mariana Islands, Chair; Kim Schrier, Washington; Jahana Hayes, Connecticut; Donna Shalala, Florida; Susan Davis, California; Frederica Wilson, Florida; Mark DeSaulnier, California; Joseph Morelle, New York	Rick W. Allen, Georgia, Ranking Member; Glenn Thompson, Pennsylvania; Glenn Grothman, Wisconsin; Van Taylor, Texas; William Timmons, South Carolina
Ex officio
Bobby Scott, Virginia	Virginia Foxx, North Carolina

=== 117th Congress ===
Majority	Minority
Gregorio Sablan, Northern Mariana Islands, Chair; Jahana Hayes, Connecticut; Raúl Grijalva, Arizona; John Yarmuth, Kentucky; Frederica Wilson, Florida; Mark DeSaulnier, California; Joseph Morelle, New York; Lucy McBath, Georgia; Andy Levin, Michigan; Kathy Manning, North Carolina; Jamaal Bowman, New York	Burgess Owens, Utah, Ranking Member; Glenn Grothman, Wisconsin; Rick W. Allen, Georgia; Fred Keller, Pennsylvania; Mary Miller, Illinois; Madison Cawthorn, North Carolina; Michelle Steel, California; Julia Letlow, Louisiana; Vacancy
Ex officio
Bobby Scott, Virginia	Virginia Foxx, North Carolina

=== 118th Congress ===
Majority	Minority
Aaron Bean, Florida, Chair; Glenn Thompson, Pennsylvania; Burgess Owens, Utah; Lisa McClain, Michigan; Mary Miller, Illinois; Michelle Steel, California; Kevin Kiley, California; Nathaniel Moran, Texas; Brandon Williams, New York	Suzanne Bonamici, Oregon, Ranking Member; Raúl Grijalva, Arizona; Gregorio Sablan, Northern Mariana Islands; Jahana Hayes, Connecticut; Jamaal Bowman, New York; Frederica Wilson, Florida; Mark DeSaulnier, California; Donald Norcross, New Jersey
Ex officio
Virginia Foxx, North Carolina	Bobby Scott, Virginia
