= United States House Education Subcommittee on Health, Employment, Labor, and Pensions =

Subcommittee of Committee on Education and Workforce
- Active United States House of Representatives; 119th Congress

Leadership
- Chair: Rick W. Allen (R)
- Ranking Member: Mark DeSaulnier (D)

Structure
- Seats: 20 (20 currently filled) 11/11 9/9
- Political parties: Majority (11): Republican (11); Minority (9): Democratic (9)

Meeting place
- 2176, Rayburn House Office Building; Washington, D.C. 20515

Phone number
- (202)-225-4527

The House Subcommittee on Health, Employment, Labor, and Pensions is a standing subcommittee within the United States House Committee on Education and Labor. It was formerly known as the Subcommittee on Employer-Employee Relations.

== Jurisdiction ==
From the Official Subcommittee website, the Subcommittee's jurisdiction includes:

- Matters dealing with relationships between employers and employees, including but not limited to the National Labor Relations Act, the Labor-Management Relations Act, and the Labor-Management Reporting and Disclosure Act
- the Bureau of Labor Statistics
- and employment-related health and retirement security, including but not limited to pension, health, other employee benefits, and the Employee Retirement Income Security Act

== Members, 119th Congress ==
Majority	Minority
Rick W. Allen, Georgia, Chair; Bob Onder, Missouri, Vice Chair; Joe Wilson, South Carolina; Virginia Foxx, North Carolina; James Comer, Kentucky; Burgess Owens, Utah; Lisa McClain, Michigan; Erin Houchin, Indiana; Michael Rulli, Ohio; Ryan Mackenzie, Pennsylvania; Michael Baumgartner, Washington	Mark DeSaulnier, California, Ranking Member; Joe Courtney, Connecticut; Donald Norcross, New Jersey; Lucy McBath, Georgia; Jahana Hayes, Connecticut; Greg Casar, Texas; Summer Lee, Pennsylvania; John Mannion, New York; Mark Takano, California
Ex officio
Tim Walberg, Michigan	Bobby Scott, Virginia

== Historical membership rosters ==
=== 115th Congress ===
Majority	Minority
Tim Walberg, Michigan, Chairman; Joe Wilson, South Carolina; Phil Roe, Tennessee; Todd Rokita, Indiana; Lou Barletta, Pennsylvania; Rick Allen, Georgia; Jason Lewis, Minnesota; Francis Rooney, Florida; Paul Mitchell, Michigan; Lloyd Smucker, Pennsylvania; Drew Ferguson, Georgia; Ron Estes, Kansas	Gregorio Sablan, Northern Mariana Islands, Ranking Member; Frederica Wilson, Florida; Donald Norcross, New Jersey; Lisa Blunt Rochester, Delaware; Carol Shea-Porter, New Hampshire; Adriano Espaillat, New York; Joe Courtney, Connecticut; Marcia Fudge, Ohio; Suzanne Bonamici, Oregon
Ex officio
Virginia Foxx, North Carolina	Bobby Scott, Virginia

=== 116th Congress ===
Majority	Minority
Frederica Wilson, Florida, Chair; Joe Courtney, Connecticut; Marcia Fudge, Ohio; Donald Norcross, New Jersey; Joseph Morelle, New York; Susan Wild, Pennsylvania; Josh Harder, California; Lucy McBath, Georgia; Lauren Underwood, Illinois; Donna Shalala, Florida; Andy Levin, Michigan; Haley Stevens, Michigan; Lori Trahan, Massachusetts	Tim Walberg, Michigan, Ranking Member; Phil Roe, Tennessee; Rick W. Allen, Georgia; Francis Rooney, Florida; Jim Banks, Indiana; Russ Fulcher, Idaho; Van Taylor, Texas; Steve Watkins, Kansas; Ron Wright, Texas; Dan Meuser, Pennsylvania; Dusty Johnson, South Dakota
Ex officio
Bobby Scott, Virginia	Virginia Foxx, North Carolina

=== 117th Congress ===
Majority	Minority
Mark DeSaulnier, California, Chair; Joe Courtney, Connecticut; Donald Norcross, New Jersey; Joseph Morelle, New York; Susan Wild, Pennsylvania; Lucy McBath, Georgia; Andy Levin, Michigan; Haley Stevens, Michigan; Frank J. Mrvan, Indiana	Rick W. Allen, Georgia, Ranking Member; Joe Wilson, South Carolina; Tim Walberg, Michigan; Jim Banks, Indiana; Diana Harshbarger, Tennessee; Mary Miller, Illinois; Scott L. Fitzgerald, Wisconsin
Ex officio
Bobby Scott, Virginia	Virginia Foxx, North Carolina

=== 118th Congress ===
Majority	Minority
Bob Good, Virginia, Chair; Rick W. Allen, Georgia; Joe Wilson, South Carolina; Tim Walberg, Michigan; Jim Banks, Indiana; Lloyd Smucker, Pennsylvania; Michelle Steel, California; Aaron Bean, Florida; Eric Burlison, Missouri; Lori Chavez-DeRemer, Oregon; Erin Houchin, Indiana	Mark DeSaulnier, California, Ranking Member; Joe Courtney, Connecticut; Donald Norcross, New Jersey; Susan Wild, Pennsylvania; Lucy McBath, Georgia; Haley Stevens, Michigan; Frank J. Mrvan, Indiana; Kathy Manning, North Carolina
Ex officio
Virginia Foxx, North Carolina	Bobby Scott, Virginia
