= United States House Education Subcommittee on Civil Rights and Human Services =

The House Subcommittee on Civil Rights and Human Services is a standing subcommittee within the United States House Committee on Education and Labor. It was created for the 116th United States Congress. However, it was abolished at the start of the 118th Congress after Republicans took control of the House of Representatives.

The Chair of the subcommittee is Suzanne Bonamici of Oregon and the Ranking Member is Republican Ross Fulcher of Idaho.

== Jurisdiction ==
- From the Official Subcommittee website, the Subcommittee's jurisdiction includes:

Matters relating to equal employment opportunities and civil rights generally; welfare reform programs, including but not limited to work incentive programs and welfare-to-work requirements; poverty and human services programs, including but not limited to the Community Services Block Grant Act and the Low Income Home Energy Assistance Program; the Native American Programs Act; school lunch and child nutrition programs; matters dealing with programs and services for the elderly, including but not limited to nutrition programs and the Older Americans Act; adolescent development programs, including but not limited to those providing for the care and treatment of certain at-risk youth such as the Juvenile Justice and Delinquency Prevention Act and the Runaway and Homeless Youth Act; and matters dealing with child abuse and domestic violence, including but not limited to the Child Abuse Prevention and Treatment Act and child adoption.

== Members, 117th Congress ==
Members, 117th Congress
Majority	Minority
Suzanne Bonamici, Oregon, Chair; Alma Adams, North Carolina; Jahana Hayes, Connecticut; Teresa Leger Fernandez, New Mexico; Frank J. Mrvan, Indiana; Jamaal Bowman, New York; Kweisi Mfume, Maryland	Russ Fulcher, Idaho, Ranking Member; Glenn Thompson, Pennsylvania; Lisa McClain, Michigan; Victoria Spartz, Indiana; Scott L. Fitzgerald, Wisconsin
Ex officio
Bobby Scott, Virginia	Virginia Foxx, North Carolina

== Historical membership rosters ==
=== 116th Congress ===
Members, 116th Congress
Majority	Minority
Suzanne Bonamici, Oregon, Chair; Raúl Grijalva, Arizona; Marcia Fudge, Ohio; Kim Schrier, Washington; Jahana Hayes, Connecticut; David Trone, Maryland; Susie Lee, Nevada	James Comer, Kentucky, Ranking Member; Glenn Thompson, Pennsylvania; Elise Stefanik, New York; Dusty Johnson, South Dakota
Ex officio
Bobby Scott, Virginia	Virginia Foxx, North Carolina
