= House Baltic Caucus =

U.S. House bipartisan caucus to strengthen ties

House Seal

The House Baltic Caucus is a bipartisan registered caucus of the United States House of Representatives. It was established in 1997. The members of the caucus are interested in strengthening economic, political, and cultural ties with Estonia, Latvia, and Lithuania.

== Purpose ==
- Maintain strong relationships with Estonia, Latvia, and Lithuania
- Promote democratic principles and human rights
- Assist in strengthening free market economies in Estonia, Latvia, and Lithuania
- Work to support legislation bolstering the defense of the Baltic countries

The Baltic States

== Membership, 119th Congress ==
As of November 26, 2025, the House Baltic Caucus has 117 members from both the Democratic and Republican Parties.

=== Leadership ===
- Rep. Don Bacon (R-NE)
- Rep. Salud Carbajal (D-CA)

=== Past co-chairs ===
Congressman John Shimkus (R-IL) was a founder of the Caucus, together with Rep. Dennis Kucinich (D-OH), and served as co-chair from 1997 to 2021. Rep. Adam Schiff (D-CA) replaced Kucinich in 2013 and was co-chair until 2021. Ruben Gallego served in the leadership until his election to the United States Senate in 2024.

=== Members ===
- Rep. Robert Aderholt (R-AL)
- Rep. Gabe Amo (D-RI)
- Rep. Becca Balint (D-VT)
- Rep. Andy Barr (R-KY)
- Rep. Tom Barrett (R-MI)
- Rep. Wesley Bell (D-MO)
- Rep. Jack Bergman (R-MI)
- Rep. Don Beyer (D-VA)
- Rep. Brendan F. Boyle (D-PA)
- Rep. Julia Brownley (D-CA)
- Rep. Nikki Budzinski (D-IL)
- Rep. Ken Calvert (R-CA)
- Rep. Kat Cammack (R-FL)
- Rep. Buddy Carter (R-GA)
- Rep. Ed Case (D-HI)
- Rep. Sheila Cherfilus-McCormick (D-FL)
- Rep. Judy Chu (D-CA)
- Rep. Gil Cisneros (D-CA)
- Rep. Steve Cohen (D-TN)
- Rep. Tom Cole (R-OK)
- Rep. Lou Correa (D-CA)
- Rep. Jim Costa (D-CA)
- Rep. Joe Courtney (D-CT)
- Rep. Jason Crow (D-CO)
- Rep. Mario Diaz-Balart (R-FL)
- Rep. Debbie Dingell (D-MI)
- Rep. Lloyd Doggett (D-TX)
- Rep. Neal Dunn (R-FL)
- Rep. Jake Ellzey (R-TX)
- Rep. Pat Fallon (R-TX)
- Rep. Chuck Fleischmann (R-TN)
- Rep. Scott Fitzgerald (R-WI)
- Rep. Brian Fitzpatrick (R-PA)
- Rep. Russell Fry (R-SC)
- Rep. John Garamendi (D-CA)
- Rep. Paul Gosar (R-AZ)
- Rep. Josh Gottheimer (D-NJ)
- Rep. Vicente Gonzalez (D-TX)
- Rep. Dan Goldman (D-NY)
- Rep. Maggie Goodlander (D-NH)
- Rep. Glenn Grothman (R-WI)
- Rep. Pat Harrigan (R-NC)
- Rep. Andy Harris (R-MD)
- Rep. Jim Himes (D-CT)
- Rep. Richard Hudson (R-NC)
- Rep. Bill Huizenga (R-MI)
- Rep. Jeff Hurd (R-CO)
- Rep. John James (R-MI)
- Rep. Julie Johnson (D-TX)
- Rep. Marcy Kaptur (D-OH)
- Rep. William Keating (D-MA)
- Rep. Trent Kelly (R-MS)
- Rep. Tim Kennedy (D-NY)
- Rep. Kevin Kiley (R-CA)
- Rep. Rick Larsen (D-WA)
- Rep. John Larson (D-CT)
- Rep. Bob Latta (R-OH)
- Rep. Mike Lawler (R-NY)
- Rep. Ted Lieu (D-CA)
- Rep. Seth Magaziner (D-RI)
- Rep. Nicole Malliotakis (R-NY)
- Rep. Brian Mast (R-FL)
- Rep. Sarah McBride (D-DE)
- Rep. Lisa McClain (R-MI)
- Rep. Betty McCollum (D-MN)
- Rep. Addison McDowell (R-NC)
- Rep. James McGovern (D-MA)
- Rep. Gregory Meeks (D-NY)
- Rep. Mark Messmer (R-IN)
- Rep. Mariannette Miller-Meeks (R-IA)
- Rep. John Moolenaar (R-MI)
- Rep. Seth Moulton (D-MA)
- Rep. Carol Miller (R-WV)
- Rep. Greg Murphy (R-NC)
- Rep. Eleanor Holmes Norton (D-Washington, DC)
- Rep. Frank Pallone (D-NJ)
- Rep. Jimmy Panetta (D-CA)
- Rep. Chris Pappas (D-NH)
- Rep. Nancy Pelosi (D-CA)
- Rep. August Pfluger (R-TX)
- Rep. Chellie Pingree (D-ME)
- Rep. Mike Quigley (D-IL)
- Rep. Jamie Raskin (D-MD)
- Rep. Guy Reschenthaler (R-PA)
- Rep. Deborah Ross (D-NC)
- Rep. Pat Ryan (D-NY)
- Rep. María Elvira Salazar (R-FL)
- Rep. Jan Schakowsky (D-IL)
- Rep. Brad Schneider (D-IL)
- Rep. Austin Scott (R-GA)
- Rep. Brad Sherman (D-CA)
- Rep. Victoria Spartz (R-IN)
- Rep. Chris Smith (R-NJ)
- Rep. Suhas Subramanyam (D-VA)
- Rep. Claudia Tenny (R-NY)
- Rep. Glenn Thompson (R-PA)
- Rep. Dina Titus (D-NV)
- Rep. Jill Tokuda (D-HI)
- Rep. Paul Tonko (D-NY)
- Rep. Lori Trahan (D-MA)
- Rep. Derek Tran (D-CA)
- Rep. Michael R. Turner (R-OH)
- Rep. Derrick Van Orden (R-WI)
- Rep. Marc Veasey (D-TX)
- Rep. Nydia Velazquez (D-NY)
- Rep. Eugene Vindman (D-VA)
- Rep. Ann Wagner (R-MO)
- Rep. Tim Walberg (R-MI)
- Rep. Randy Weber (R-TX)
- Rep. Nikema Williams (D-GA)
- Rep. Roger Williams (R-TX)
- Rep. Joe Wilson (R-SC)
- Rep. Rob Wittman (R-VA)
- Rep. Steve Womack (R-AR)
- Rep. Ryan Zinke (R-MT)

== Legislation ==
Leaders and members of the Baltic Caucus have worked in the past toward passing legislation regarding Estonia, Latvia, and Lithuania, issues that affect the region and its constituency in America. These efforts include, but are not limited to:

118th Congress

- H.R.2922 "Baltic Security Initiative Act" - Legislation providing the Department of Defense with $350 million over three years to provide the Baltic States with defense aid.

117th Congress

- S.Res.499, H.R.1142 A resolution celebrating 100 years of diplomatic relations between the United States and the Baltic States.

115th Congress

- H.Res.826 Noting the Baltic States of Estonia's, Latvia's, and Lithuania's 100th anniversary of independence.

113th Congress

- H.R.4435 Howard P. "Buck" McKeon National Defense Authorization Act for Fiscal Year 2015 – Legislation designating August 23 as a "Black Ribbon Day" commemorating the victims of both Soviet communist and Nazi terror passed on May 22 in the U.S. House of Representatives. [Did not become public law.]
- H.Res.509 Expressing support for the designation of August 23 as Black Ribbon Day to recognize the victims of Soviet Communist and Nazi regimes. [Introduced in the House. Sponsor: Rep John Shimkus, cosponsors 18]
- H.RES.302 Expressing support for designation of August 23 as "Black Ribbon Day" to recognize the victims of Soviet Communist and Nazi regimes. [Introduced to House. Sponsor: Rep John Shimkus, cosponsors 46.]

112th Congress

- H.Res.790 Expressing support for designation of August 23 as Black Ribbon Day to recognize the victims of Soviet Communist and Nazi regimes. [Introduced to House. Sponsor: Rep. Daniel Lungren, cosponsors 3]

111th Congress

- H.CON.RES.267 Congratulating the Baltic nations of Estonia, Latvia, and Lithuania on the 20th anniversary of the reestablishment of their full independence. [Passed the House.]
- H.RES.285 Congratulating the people of the Republic of Lithuania on the 1000th anniversary of Lithuania and celebrating the rich history of Lithuania. [Passed the House. Sponsor: Rep John Shimkus, cosponsors 19.]
- H.RES.496 Recognizing the 20th anniversary of the fall of the Berlin Wall. [Passed the House. Sponsor: Rep Ted Poe, cosponsors 21.]

110th Congress

- H.RES.1405 Congratulating the Republic of Latvia on the 90th anniversary of its declaration of independence. [Introduced in House. Sponsor: Rep John Shimkus]
- H.CON.RES.371 Strongly supporting an immediate and just restitution of, or compensation for, property illegally confiscated during the last century by Nazi and Communist regimes. [Passed the House]
- H.CON.RES.255 Expressing the sense of Congress regarding the United States commitment to preservation of religious and cultural sites and condemning instances where sites are desecrated. [Passed the House.]
- H.RES.397 Condemning violence in Estonia and attacks on Estonia's embassies in 2007, and expressing solidarity with the Government and the people of Estonia. [Passed the House. Sponsor: Rep John Shimkus, cosponsors 34.]

109th Congress

- H.R.5730 To designate Poland, Hungary, the Czech Republic, Estonia, Latvia, and Lithuania as program countries under the visa waiver program established under section 217 of the Immigration and Nationality Act. [Introduced in House.]
- H.CON.RES.128 Expressing the sense of Congress that the Government of the Russian Federation should issue a clear and unambiguous statement of admission and condemnation of the illegal occupation and annexation by the Soviet Union from 1940 to 1991 of the Baltic countries of Estonia, Latvia, and Lithuania. [Passed the House. Sponsor: Rep John Shimkus, cosponsors 29.]

108th Congress

- H.RES.558 Welcoming the accession of Bulgaria, Estonia, Latvia, Lithuania, Romania, Slovakia, and Slovenia to the North Atlantic Treaty Organization (NATO), and for other purposes. [Passed the House. Sponsor: Rep. Doug Bereuter, cosponsors 20.]

107th Congress

- H.Con.Res.116 - Recommending the integration of Lithuania, Latvia, and Estonia into the North Atlantic Treaty Organization (NATO). [Passed the House. Sponsor: Rep. John Shimkus, cosponsors 56.]
- H.CON.RES.131 Congratulating the Baltic nations of Estonia, Latvia, and Lithuania on the tenth anniversary of the reestablishment of their full independence. [Introduced in House. Sponsor: Rep. Christopher Smith, cosponsors 26.]

106th Congress

- H.CON.RES.258 Congratulating the Republic of Lithuania on the tenth anniversary of the reestablishment of its independence from the rule of the former Soviet Union. [Introduced in House. Sponsor: Rep John Shimkus, cosponsors 2.]
- H.CON.RES.319 Congratulating the Republic of Latvia on the 10th anniversary of the reestablishment of its independence from the rule of the former Soviet Union. [Passed House and Senate, did not become Public law. Sponsor: Rep John Shimkus, cosponsors 8.]
- H.CON.RES.21 Recommending the integration of Lithuania, Latvia, and Estonia into the North Atlantic Treaty Organization (NATO). [Introduced in House. Sponsor: Rep John Shimkus, cosponsors 21.]

105th Congress

- H.CON.RES.10 Recommending the integration of Estonia, Latvia, and Lithuania into the North Atlantic Treaty Organization. [Introduced in House. Sponsor: Rep Gerald Solomon, cosponsors 42.]

104th Congress

- H.R.3564 To amend the NATO Participation Act of 1994 to expedite the transition to full membership in the North Atlantic Treaty Organization of emerging democracies in Central and Eastern Europe.
- H.CON.RES.51 Expressing the sense of the Congress relating to the removal of Russian troops from Kaliningrad. [Passed the House. Sponsor: Christopher Cox, cosponsors: 56]
