= United States House Education Subcommittee on Workforce Protections =

Subcommittee of Committee on Education and Workforce
- Active United States House of Representatives; 119th Congress

Leadership
- Chair: Ryan Mackenzie (R)
- Ranking Member: Ilhan Omar (D)

Structure
- Seats: 10 (10 currently filled) 6/6 4/4
- Political parties: Majority (6): Republican (6); Minority (4): Democratic (4)

Meeting place
- 2176, Rayburn House Office Building; Washington, D.C. 20515

Phone number
- (202)-225-4527

The House Subcommittee on Workforce Protections is a standing subcommittee within the United States House Committee on Education and Labor.

== Jurisdiction ==
The Subcommittee's jurisdiction includes:

- Wages and hours of workers, including but not limited to the Davis-Bacon Act, the Walsh-Healey Act, the McNamara–O'Hara Service Contract Act, and the Fair Labor Standards Act
- Workers’ compensation, including but not limited to the Federal Employees' Compensation Act, the Longshore and Harbor Workers’ Compensation Act, and the Black Lung Benefits Act
- The Migrant and Seasonal Agricultural Worker Protection Act
- The Family and Medical Leave Act
- The Worker Adjustment and Retraining Notification Act
- The Employee Polygraph Protection Act of 1988
- Trade, international labor rights, and immigration issues as they affect employers and workers; and workers’ safety and health, including but not limited to occupational safety and health, mine safety and health, and migrant and agricultural worker safety and health.

== Members, 119th Congress ==
Majority	Minority
Ryan Mackenzie, Pennsylvania, Chair; Mark Messmer, Indiana, Vice Chair; Glenn Grothman, Wisconsin; Elise Stefanik, New York; James Comer, Kentucky; Mary Miller, Illinois	Ilhan Omar, Minnesota, Ranking Member; Haley Stevens, Michigan; Greg Casar, Texas; Mark Takano, California
Ex officio
Tim Walberg, Michigan	Bobby Scott, Virginia

== Historical membership rosters ==
=== 115th Congress ===
Majority	Minority
Bradley Byrne, Alabama, Chairman; Joe Wilson, South Carolina; Duncan D. Hunter, California; Dave Brat, Virginia; Glenn Grothman, Wisconsin; Elise Stefanik, New York; Francis Rooney, Florida; Drew Ferguson, Georgia	Mark Takano, California, Ranking Member; Raúl Grijalva, Arizona; Alma Adams, North Carolina; Mark DeSaulnier, California; Donald Norcross, New Jersey; Raja Krishnamoorthi, Illinois; Carol Shea Porter, New Hampshire
Ex officio
Virginia Foxx, North Carolina	Bobby Scott, Virginia

=== 116th Congress ===
Majority	Minority
Alma Adams, North Carolina, Chair; Mark Takano, California; Mark DeSaulnier, California; Pramila Jayapal, Washington; Susan Wild, Pennsylvania; Lucy McBath, Georgia; Ilhan Omar, Minnesota; Haley Stevens, Michigan	Bradley Byrne, Alabama, Ranking Member; Francis Rooney, Florida; Mark Walker, North Carolina; Ben Cline, Virginia; Ron Wright, Texas
Ex officio
Bobby Scott, Virginia	Virginia Foxx, North Carolina

=== 117th Congress ===
Majority	Minority
Alma Adams, North Carolina, Chair; Mark Takano, California; Donald Norcross, New Jersey; Pramila Jayapal, Washington; Ilhan Omar, Minnesota; Haley Stevens, Michigan; Mondaire Jones, New York; John Yarmuth, Kentucky	Fred Keller, Pennsylvania, Ranking Member; Elise Stefanik, New York; Mariannette Miller-Meeks, Iowa; Burgess Owens, Utah; Bob Good, Virginia; Madison Cawthorn, North Carolina; Michelle Steel, California
Ex officio
Bobby Scott, Virginia	Virginia Foxx, North Carolina

=== 118th Congress ===
Majority	Minority
Kevin Kiley, California, Chair; Glenn Grothman, Wisconsin; Elise Stefanik, New York; James Comer, Kentucky; Mary Miller, Illinois; Eric Burlison, Missouri	Alma Adams, North Carolina, Ranking Member; Mark Takano, California; Ilhan Omar, Minnesota; Haley Stevens, Michigan
Ex officio
Virginia Foxx, North Carolina	Bobby Scott, Virginia
