= Mondaire Jones =

American politician (born 1987)

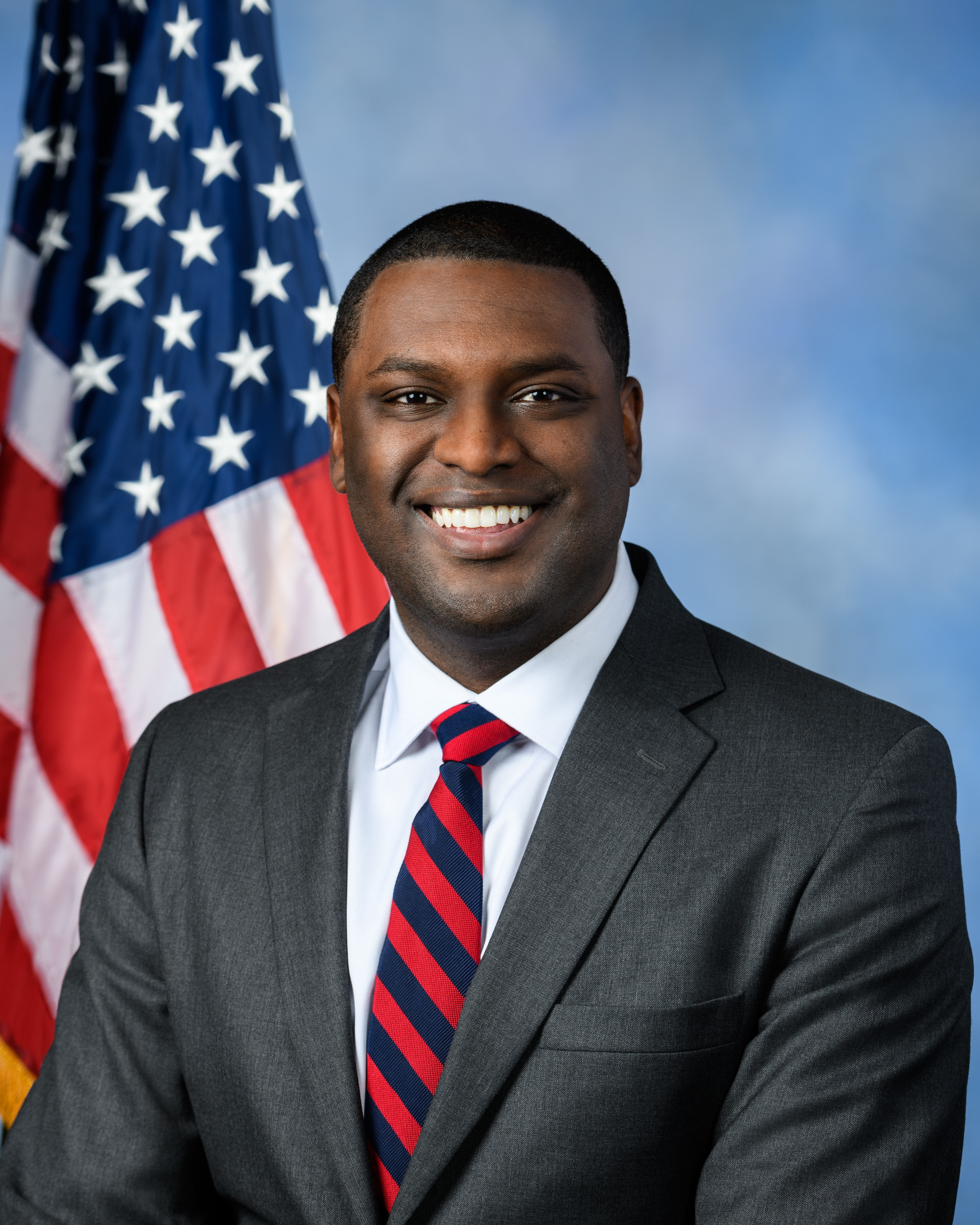
- Official portrait, 2021

Member of the United States Commission on Civil Rights
- Incumbent
- Assumed office January 18, 2023
- Appointed by: Nancy Pelosi
- Preceded by: Michael Yaki

Member of the U.S. House of Representatives from New York's 17th district
- In office January 3, 2021 – January 3, 2023
- Preceded by: Nita Lowey
- Succeeded by: Mike Lawler

Personal details
- Born: Mondaire Lamar Jones; May 18, 1987 (age 39) Nyack, New York, U.S.
- Party: Democratic
- Education: Stanford University (BA); Harvard University (JD)
- Website: Official website

Mondaire Lamar Jones (born May 18, 1987) is an American lawyer and politician serving as a member of the United States Commission on Civil Rights since 2023. A member of the Democratic Party, Jones was the U.S. representative for New York's 17th congressional district from 2021 to 2023.

In Congress, his political ideology aligned with the progressive wing of the Democratic Party. He was an advocate for Medicare for All and the Green New Deal. In June 2020, he supported calls to defund the police, and said that his goal in running for Congress was to "fight systemic racism". When first elected, he became one of the two first openly gay Black members of Congress.

After the 2020 redistricting cycle, Jones opted not to seek re-election in the redrawn 17th district; instead, he ran for Congress in New York's 10th congressional district, located in New York City. He finished third in the Democratic primary. In July 2023, Jones announced that he would run for Congress in the 17th district (his former district) in 2024, a race in which he distanced himself from his prior associations with progressivism. He was defeated by Republican incumbent Mike Lawler in the general election.

== Early life and career ==
Jones was born in Nyack, New York, and grew up in Spring Valley, New York, where he was raised by a single mother, who worked multiple jobs to support him, and his grandparents. He graduated from public schools in the East Ramapo Central School District.

Jones earned his bachelor's degree from Stanford University in 2009. After graduating from Stanford, he worked in the U.S. Department of Justice during the presidency of Barack Obama. He then earned his Juris Doctor from Harvard Law School in 2013.

After law school, Jones worked as a law clerk for Andrew L. Carter Jr. of the U.S. District Court for the Southern District of New York. He also worked for Davis Polk & Wardwell for four years, and one year with the Westchester County Law Department.

== U.S. House of Representatives ==
=== Elections ===
==== 2020 ====
2020 election results for the U.S. House of Representative for New York's 17th district

Jones announced his candidacy for the Democratic nomination to represent the 17th district, including most of central and northwestern Westchester County and all of Rockland County, against 16-term incumbent Nita Lowey. Three months after he entered the race, Lowey announced that she would not seek reelection. He advocated for Medicare for All and the Green New Deal. He also expressed support for defunding the police.

In an eight-way Democratic primary—the real contest in this heavily Democratic district—Jones defeated attorney Adam Schleifer, former Deputy Assistant Secretary of Defense Evelyn Farkas, State Senator David Carlucci, and State Assemblyman David Buchwald, among others, winning 42% of the vote. The Associated Press called the race for Jones on July 14, 2020, three weeks after the June 23 primary, the vote tabulation having been delayed because of a large number of absentee ballots due to the COVID-19 pandemic.

In August, Jones filed a lawsuit against President Donald Trump and Postmaster General Louis DeJoy to reverse recent changes made to the United States Postal Service (USPS) that affected the agency's ability to deliver mail, including absentee ballots. Jones sued Trump and DeJoy "for violating the Constitution in their attempts to undermine the United States Postal Service and thwart free and fair elections this November." In September, U.S. District Court Judge Victor Marrero granted an injunction against the USPS that required it to restore overtime and treat all mail-in ballots as first-class mail.

In the November general election, Jones faced Republican nominee Maureen McArdle Schulman, a former FDNY firefighter, as well as several third-party candidates. The Associated Press called the race for Jones the day after the election. Along with Ritchie Torres from New York's 15th congressional district, Jones was one of the first gay African Americans elected to the United States House of Representatives.

==== 2022 ====
Following redistricting, the 17th district included the residence of Sean Patrick Maloney, the Democratic incumbent in the neighboring 18th district and chair of the Democratic Congressional Campaign Committee. Jones was no longer in the court drawn 17th district. According to The Guardian, "Maloney decided to run in New York's 17th congressional district rather than his longtime, more urban, 18th district, even though that meant booting out the newer Mondaire Jones, his fellow Democrat and the incumbent congressman in the 17th district". According to The Hill, Maloney's decision "infuriated Jones and his allies, particularly those in the Congressional Black Caucus, who accused Maloney of putting his own political survival over the interests of the party". In 2024, City & State reported that in actuality, Maloney had privately offered to withdraw from the primary, but Jones declined Maloney's offer in order to run in another district.

Jones opted not to challenge Maloney in the redrawn 17th district; instead, on May 20, 2022, he announced that he would seek election in New York's 10th congressional district. The district is located entirely in New York City, an area Jones had not represented nor lived in until he moved to Carroll Gardens, Brooklyn before the primary; prompting accusations of 'carpetbagging'.

He finished third in the Democratic primary, behind winning candidate attorney Dan Goldman and runner-up state assemblymember Yuh-Line Niou respectively. Jones received 18.2% of the vote.

==== 2024 ====
In July 2023, Jones announced his candidacy to return to Congress, running in the 17th district after relocating to Sleepy Hollow, a village within the district's boundaries.

After the removal of Speaker Kevin McCarthy, Jones tweeted a photo of McCarthy and Lawler meeting with Jewish leaders in Rockland County. The photo's caption read: "Well that was a waste of time." The post was condemned as antisemitic by Democrats Jared Moskowitz and Josh Gottheimer. Jones took down the tweet and apologized for any misunderstanding. Following the removal Moskowitz and Gottheimer took down their response and Moskowitz accepted Jones's apology and emphasized his record of opposing antisemitism.

Jones's entry into the race solidified his position as the Democratic frontrunner, effectively clearing the primary field. By April 2024, he had raised over $3 million for his campaign.

On Election Day, Jones was defeated by Republican incumbent Mike Lawler.

=== Tenure ===
Jones voted to certify the 2020 United States presidential election and later voted to impeach during Trump's second impeachment. He and Ted Lieu co-wrote a letter to the Attorney Grievance Committee of the New York State Supreme Court-Appellate Division asking for Rudy Giuliani to be disbarred due to his role in the January 6 United States Capitol attack.

Jones successfully lobbied U.S. Immigration and Customs Enforcement to halt the deportation of Paul Pierrilus, who was scheduled to be the last person to be deported during the Trump administration. Pierrilus, a constituent of Jones's, was to be deported to Haiti, a country he had never been to, before Jones intervened.

Jones, Senator Ed Markey, Representative Hank Johnson, and House Judiciary chair Jerry Nadler pushed for an expansion of the Supreme Court from 9 seats to 13. Around the same time, Jones called for a "Third Reconstruction" in a Washington Post opinion piece. He criticized President Obama for supporting the 9-member status quo system of the Supreme Court and opposing the court's expansion.

=== Committee assignments ===
- House Democratic Steering and Policy Committee
- House Judiciary Committee
  - Subcommittee on Antitrust, Commercial and Administrative Law
  - Subcommittee on Courts, Intellectual Property and the Internet
- House Committee on Education and Labor
  - Subcommittee on Workforce Protections
  - Subcommittee on Higher Education and Workforce Investment
- House Committee on Ethics

=== Caucus memberships ===
- Congressional Progressive Caucus
- Congressional Black Caucus
- Congressional LGBT Equality Caucus (co-chair)

== After Congress ==
In 2023, Jones was Speaker Nancy Pelosi's appointee to the United States Commission on Civil Rights, a federal agency focused on investigating and reporting on civil rights issues. The same year, he joined CNN as an on-air contributor and began working with the nonprofit Future Forward USA Action, which supports progressive causes.

== Personal life ==
Jones publicly came out as gay at the age of 24 and is a member of the First Baptist Church of Spring Valley. In 2020, marking the 50th anniversary of the first gay Pride parade, Queerty recognized Jones as one of 50 individuals "leading the nation toward equality, acceptance, and dignity for all people."

== Electoral history ==
=== 2020 ===
2020 Democratic primary, New York's 17th congressional district
Party	Candidate	Votes	%
Democratic	Mondaire Jones	32,796	41.91%
Democratic	Adam Schleifer	12,732	16.27%
Democratic	Evelyn Farkas	12,210	15.60%
Democratic	David Carlucci	8,649	11.05%
Democratic	David Buchwald	6,673	8.53%
Democratic	Asha Castleberry-Hernandez	2,062	2.64%
Democratic	Allison Fine	1,588	2.03%
Democratic	Catherine Parker	1,539	1.97%
Total votes		78,246	100%

2020 general election, New York's 17th congressional district
Party	Candidate	Votes	%
Democratic	Mondaire Jones	183,975	55.27%
Working Families	Mondaire Jones	13,378	4.02%
Total	Mondaire Jones	197,353	59.29%
Republican	Maureen McArdle Schulman	117,307	35.25%
Conservative	Yehudis Gottesfeld	8,887	2.67%
Education. Community. Law.	Joshua Eisen	6,363	1.91%
SAM	Michael Parietti	2,745	0.82%
Write-in		197	0.06%
Total votes		332,852	100%
Democratic hold			

=== 2022 ===
2022 Democratic primary, New York's 10th congressional district
Party	Candidate	Votes	%
Democratic	Dan Goldman	16,686	25.8
Democratic	Yuh-Line Niou	15,380	23.7
Democratic	Mondaire Jones (incumbent) (Note: Due to redistricting, Mondaire Jones decided to move to NY-10, which is not connected by territory to his home district of NY-17.)	11,777	18.2
Democratic	Carlina Rivera	10,985	17.0
Democratic	Jo Anne Simon	3,991	6.2
Democratic	Elizabeth Holtzman	2,845	4.4
Democratic	Jimmy Li	777	1.2
Democratic	Yan Xiong	686	1.1
Democratic	Maud Maron	578	0.9
Democratic	Bill de Blasio (withdrawn)	477	0.7
Democratic	Brian Robinson	322	0.5
Democratic	Peter Gleason	147	0.2
Democratic	Quanda Francis	121	0.2
Total votes		64,772	100.0

=== 2024 ===
2024 Working Families primary, New York's 17th congressional district
Party	Candidate	Votes	%
Working Families	Anthony Frascone	287	59.30%
Working Families	Mondaire Jones	197	40.70%
Total votes		484	100%

2024 general election, New York's 17th congressional district
Party	Candidate	Votes	%
Republican	Mike Lawler	180,924	47.67%
Conservative	Mike Lawler	16,921	4.46%
Total	Mike Lawler (incumbent)	197,845	52.13%
Democratic	Mondaire Jones	173,899	45.82%
Working Families	Anthony Frascone	7,530	1.98%
Write-in		234	0.06%
Total votes		379,508	100%
Republican hold			

== See also ==
- List of African-American United States representatives
- List of LGBT members of the United States Congress

== Notes ==
U.S. House of Representatives
Preceded by Nita Lowey	Member of the U.S. House of Representatives from New York's 17th congressional district 2021–2023	Succeeded by Mike Lawler
U.S. order of precedence (ceremonial)
Preceded by Chris Jacobs as Former U.S. Representative	Order of precedence of the United States as Former U.S. Representative	Succeeded by Anthony D'Esposito as Former U.S. Representative
