= United States House Committee on Education and Workforce =

Standing committee of the United States House of Representatives

House Education Committee
Standing committee
- Active United States House of Representatives; 119th Congress

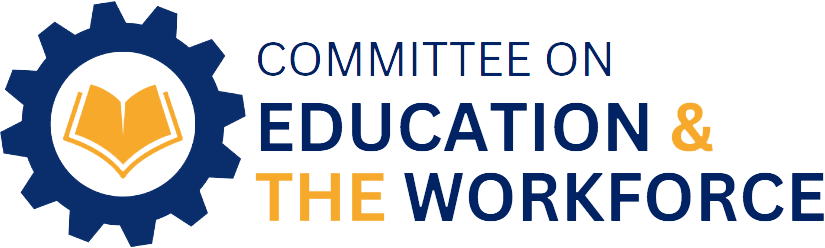
- Committee logo from 2023–2025

History
- Formed: March 21, 1867
- Formerly known as: Committee on Education and Labor; Committee on Education; Committee on Labor; Committee on Economic and Educational Opportunities

Leadership
- Chair: Tim Walberg (R); Since January 3, 2025
- Ranking Member: Bobby Scott (D); Since January 3, 2023

Structure
- Seats: 37 (37 currently filled) 21/21 16/16
- Political parties: Majority (21): Republican (20); Independent (1); Minority (16): Democratic (16)

Jurisdiction
- Senate counterpart: United States Senate Committee on Health, Education, Labor and Pensions

Subcommittees
- Health, Employment, Labor, and Pensions; Workforce Protections; Higher Education and Workforce Development; Early Childhood, Elementary, and Secondary Education

Meeting place
- 2176, Rayburn House Office Building; Washington, D.C. 20515

Website
- edworkforce.house.gov (Republican) democrats-edworkforce.house.gov (Democratic)

Phone number
- (202)-225-4527

The United States House Committee on Education and Workforce (also known as Committee on Education and the Workforce) is a standing committee of the United States House of Representatives. There are 45 members of this committee. Since 2025, the chair of the Education and Workforce committee is Republican Tim Walberg of Michigan.

== History of the committee ==
Attempts were made to create a congressional committee on education and labor starting with the early congresses but issues over Congress's constitutional ability to oversee such issues delayed the committee's formation. Finally, on March 21, 1867, the Committee on Education and Labor was founded following the end of the Civil War and during the rapid industrialization of America. On December 19, 1883, the committee was divided into two, the Committee on Education and the Committee on Labor. The committees again merged on January 2, 1947, after the passage of the Legislative Reorganization Act of 1946, becoming the Committee on Education and Labor again.

=== Name changes ===
On January 4, 1995, when the Republicans took over the House, the committee was renamed the Committee on Economic and Educational Opportunities. It was renamed again as the Committee on Education and the Workforce two years later on January 7, 1997. On January 4, 2007, with the Democrats once again in the majority, the committee's name was changed back to Committee on Education and Labor. After Republicans recaptured the House majority in the 2010 elections, they returned to the name, Committee on Education and the Workforce, effective with the opening of the 112th Congress in 2011. After Democrats recaptured the House majority in the 2018 elections, they similarly returned to the previous name, Committee on Education and Labor, effective with the opening of the 116th Congress in 2019. With the passing of the new House Rules associated to the Speaker negotiations in January 2023, the 118th Congress renamed the committee as the Committee on Education and the Workforce again.

== Jurisdiction ==
=== Education policy ===
- Elementary and secondary education initiatives including the Every Student Succeeds Act, school choice for low-income families, special education (the Individuals with Disabilities Education Act), and teacher quality and education
- Postsecondary education programs, including the Higher Education Act, which supports college access for low- and middle-income students and helps families pay for college;
- Workforce development and skills development activities and adult education, and workforce development initiatives, including those under the Workforce Innovation and Opportunity Act (WIOA), which help local communities reskill and upskill workers;
- Early childhood care and preschool education programs, including Head Start and the Child Care and Development Block Grant;
- Career and technical education programs;
- School lunch and child nutrition programs;
- Programs for the care and treatment of at-risk youth, child abuse prevention, and adoption;
- Programs for older Americans;
- Educational research and improvement;
- Work requirements under the Temporary Assistance for Needy Families (TANF) program and other federal programs;
- Adolescent development programs, including but not limited to those providing for the care and treatment of certain at-risk youth, including the Juvenile Justice and Delinquency Prevention Act and the Runaway and Homeless Youth Act and
- Anti-poverty programs, including the Community Services Block Grant Act and the Low Income Home Energy Assistance Program (LIHEAP).

=== Workforce policy ===
- Pensions, health care, and other employer-sponsored benefits covered by the Employee Retirement Income Security Act (ERISA);
- Application of the National Labor Relations Act (NLRA) to collective bargaining and union representation;
- Occupational safety and health and mine safety;
- Unpaid, job-protected leave as outlined in the Family Medical Leave Act (FMLA), as well as "comp time" or family friendly work schedules;
- Equal employment opportunity and civil rights in employment, including the Americans with Disabilities Act (ADA);
- Various temporary worker programs under the Immigration and Nationality Act;
- Wage and hour requirements under the Fair Labor Standards Act (FLSA);
- Prevailing wage requirements for federal contractors under the Davis-Bacon Act and the Service Contract Act;
- Workers' compensation for federal employees, energy employees, longshore and harbor employees, and individuals affected by black lung disease; and
- Matters dealing with employer and employee relations, as well as union transparency (the Labor-Management Reporting and Disclosure Act).

== Members, 119th Congress ==
Majority	Minority
Tim Walberg, Michigan, Chair; Joe Wilson, South Carolina; Virginia Foxx, North Carolina; Glenn Thompson, Pennsylvania; Glenn Grothman, Wisconsin; Elise Stefanik, New York; Rick Allen, Georgia; James Comer, Kentucky; Burgess Owens, Utah, Vice Chair; Lisa McClain, Michigan; Mary Miller, Illinois; Julia Letlow, Louisiana; Kevin Kiley, California (from April 15, 2026); Erin Houchin, Indiana; Michael Rulli, Ohio; James Moylan, Guam (from February 5, 2025); Bob Onder, Missouri; Ryan Mackenzie, Pennsylvania; Michael Baumgartner, Washington; Mark Harris, North Carolina; Mark Messmer, Indiana; Randy Fine, Florida (from April 8, 2025)	Bobby Scott, Virginia, Ranking Member; Raúl Grijalva, Arizona (until March 13, 2025); Joe Courtney, Connecticut; Frederica Wilson, Florida; Suzanne Bonamici, Oregon; Mark Takano, California; Alma Adams, North Carolina; Mark DeSaulnier, California; Donald Norcross, New Jersey; Lucy McBath, Georgia; Jahana Hayes, Connecticut; Ilhan Omar, Minnesota; Haley Stevens, Michigan; Greg Casar, Texas, Vice Ranking Member; Summer Lee, Pennsylvania; John Mannion, New York; Yassamin Ansari, Arizona (from May 20, 2025 but no longer on the committee); Adelita Grijalva, Arizona (from November 18, 2025)

Resolutions electing members: H.Res. 13 (Chair), H.Res. 14 (Ranking Member), H.Res. 38 (R), H.Res. 40 (D), H.Res. 107 (Moylan), H.Res. 300 (Fine), H.Res. 430 (Ansari), H.Res. 887 (Grijalva), H.Res. 1176 (Kiley)

== Subcommittees ==
Subcommittee	Chair	Ranking Member
Early Childhood, Elementary, and Secondary Education	Kevin Kiley (R-CA) (until March 18, 2026)	Suzanne Bonamici (D-OR)
Health, Employment, Labor, and Pensions	Rick Allen (R-GA)	Mark Desaulnier (D-CA)
Higher Education and Workforce Development	Burgess Owens (R-UT)	Alma Adams (D-NC)
Workforce Protections	Ryan Mackenzie (R-PA)	Ilhan Omar (D-MN)

== Leadership ==
The committee keeps a record of party leadership for all its predecessors, including the ranking minority members.

=== Committee on Education and Labor (1867–1883) ===
Chairs
Name	Party	State	Start	End
Jehu Baker	Republican	IL	1867	1860
Samuel Cary	Republican	OH	1869	
Samuel Arnell	Republican	TN	1869	1871
Legrand W. Perce	Republican	MS	1871	1873
James Monroe	Republican	OH	1873	1875
Gilbert Walker	Democratic	VA	1875	1877
John Goode	Democratic	VA	1877	1881
Jonathan T. Updegraff	Republican	OH	1881	1882
John C. Sherwin	Republican	IL	1882	1883

=== Committee on Education (1883–1947) ===
Chairs
Name	Party	State	Start	End
D. Wyatt Aiken	Democratic	SC	1883	1887
Allen D. Candler	Democratic	GA	1887	1889
James O'Donnell	Republican	MI	1889	1891
Walter I. Hayes	Democratic	IA	1891	1892
David B. Brunner	Democratic	PA	1892	
Benjamin A. Enloe	Democratic	TN	1892	1895
Galusha A. Grow	Republican	PA	1895	1903
George N. Southwick	Republican	NY	1903	1909
James Burke	Republican	PA	1909	1911
Frank Lever	Democratic	SC	1911	1913
Dudley Hughes	Democratic	GA	1913	1917
William J. Sears	Democratic	FL	1917	1919
Simeon D. Fess	Republican	OH	1919	1923
Frederick W. Dallinger	Republican	MA	1923	1925
Daniel Reed	Republican	NY	1925	1931
John J. Douglass	Democratic	MA	1931	1935
Vincent Palmisano	Democratic	MD	1935	1937
William Larrabee	Democratic	IN	1937	1943
Graham Barden	Democratic	NC	1943	1947

Ranking members
Name	Party	State	Start	End
David A. De Armond	Democrat	MO	1889	1903
Willard Vandiver	Democratic	MO	1903	1905
Edwin Y. Webb	Democratic	NC	1905	1907
Frank Lever	Democratic	SC	1907	1911
James Burke	Republican	PA	1911	1915
Caleb Powers	Republican	KY	1915	1919
William J. Sears	Democratic	FL	1919	1921
William B. Bankhead	Democratic	AL	1921	1923
Bill G. Lowrey	Democratic	MS	1923	1929
Loring M. Black Jr.	Democratic	NY	1929	1931
Daniel Reed	Republican	NY	1931	1933
James L. Whitley	Republican	NY	1933	1935
Albert E. Carter	Republican	CA	1935	1937
George Dondero	Republican	MI	1937	1947

=== Committee on Labor (1883–1947) ===
Chairs
Name	Party	State	Start	End
James Hopkins	Democratic	PA	1883	1885
John O'Neill	Democratic	MO	1885	1889
William H. Wade	Republican	MO	1889	1891
John Tarsney	Democratic	MO	1891	1893
Lawrence E. McGann	Democratic	IL	1893	1895
Thomas Phillips	Republican	PA	1895	1897
John J. Gardner	Republican	NJ	1897	1911
William Wilson	Democratic	PA	1911	1913
David Lewis	Democratic	MD	1913	1917
James P. Maher	Democratic	NY	1917	1919
John M. C. Smith	Republican	MI	1919	1921
John I. Nolan	Republican	CA	1921	1922
Frederick Zihlman	Republican	MD	1922	1925
William F. Kopp	Republican	IA	1925	1930
Richard Welch	Republican	CA	1930	1931
William P. Connery Jr.	Democratic	MA	1931	1937
Mary Teresa Norton	Democratic	NJ	1937	1947

Ranking members
Name	Party	State	Start	End
Jasper Talbert	Democratic	SC	1889	1903
Ben F. Caldwell	Democratic	IL	1903	1905
William Randolph Hearst	Democratic	NY	1905	1907
Henry T. Rainey	Democratic	IL	1907	1911
John J. Gardner	Republican	NJ	1911	1913
John M. C. Smith	Republican	MI	1913	1919
James P. Maher	Democratic	NY	1919	1921
Eugene Black	Democratic	TX	1921	1923
William D. Upshaw	Democratic	GA	1923	1927
William P. Connery Jr.	Democratic	MA	1927	1931
Richard Welch	Republican	CA	1931	1947

=== Committee on Education and Labor (1947–1995) ===
Chairs
Name	Party	State	Start	End
Fred Hartley	Republican	NJ	1947	1949
John Lesinski	Democratic	MI	1949	1950
Graham Barden	Democratic	NC	1950	1953
Samuel McConnell	Republican	PA	1953	1955
Graham Barden	Democratic	NC	1955	1961
Adam Clayton Powell	Democratic	NY	1961	1967
Carl D. Perkins	Democratic	KY	1967	1984
Augustus Hawkins	Democratic	CA	1984	1991
William D. Ford	Democratic	MI	1991	1995

Ranking members
Name	Party	State	Start	End
John Lesinski	Democratic	MI	1947	1949
Samuel McConnell	Republican	PA	1949	1953
Graham Barden	Democratic	NC	1953	1955
Samuel McConnell	Republican	PA	1955	1957
Ralph W. Gwinn	Republican	NY	1957	1959
Carroll D. Kearns	Republican	PA	1959	1963
Peter Frelinghuysen	Republican	NJ	1963	1965
William Ayres	Republican	OH	1965	1971
Al Quie	Republican	MN	1971	1979
John M. Ashbrook	Republican	OH	1979	1982
John N. Erlenborn	Republican	IL	1982	1985
Jim Jeffords	Republican	VT	1985	1989
Bill Goodling	Republican	PA	1989	1995

=== Committee on Economic and Educational Opportunities (1995–1997) ===
Chair
Name	Party	State	Start	End
Bill Goodling	Republican	PA	1995	1997

Ranking member
Name	Party	State	Start	End
Bill Clay	Democratic	MO	1995	1997

=== Committee on Education and the Workforce (1997–2007) ===
Chairs
Name	Party	State	Start	End
Bill Goodling	Republican	PA	1997	2001
John Boehner	Republican	OH	2001	2006
Buck McKeon	Republican	CA	2006	2007

Ranking members
Name	Party	State	Start	End
Bill Clay	Democratic	MO	1997	2001
George Miller	Democratic	CA	2001	2007

=== Committee on Education and Labor (2007–2011) ===
Chair
Name	Party	State	Start	End
George Miller	Democratic	CA	2007	2011

Ranking members
Name	Party	State	Start	End
Buck McKeon	Republican	CA	2007	2009
John Kline	Republican	MI	2009	2011

=== Committee on Education and the Workforce (2011–2019) ===
Chairs
Name	Party	State	Start	End
John Kline	Republican	MN	2011	2017
Virginia Foxx	Republican	NC	2017	2019

Ranking members
Name	Party	State	Start	End
George Miller	Democratic	CA	2011	2015
Bobby Scott	Democratic	VA	2015	2019

=== Committee on Education and Labor (2019–2023) ===
Chair
Name	Party	State	Start	End
Bobby Scott	Democratic	VA	2019	2023

Ranking member
Name	Party	State	Start	End
Virginia Foxx	Republican	NC	2019	2023

=== Committee on Education and the Workforce (2023–2025) ===
Chair
Name	Party	State	Start	End
Virginia Foxx	Republican	NC	2023	2025

Ranking member
Name	Party	State	Start	End
Bobby Scott	Democratic	VA	2023	2025

=== Committee on Education and Workforce (2025–present) ===
Chair
Name	Party	State	Start	End
Tim Walberg	Republican	MI	2025	present

Ranking member
Name	Party	State	Start	End
Bobby Scott	Democratic	VA	2025	present

== Historical membership rosters ==
=== 115th Congress ===
Majority	Minority
Virginia Foxx, North Carolina, Chair; Joe Wilson, South Carolina, Vice Chair; Duncan D. Hunter, California; Phil Roe, Tennessee; Glenn Thompson, Pennsylvania; Tim Walberg, Michigan; Brett Guthrie, Kentucky; Todd Rokita, Indiana; Lou Barletta, Pennsylvania; Luke Messer, Indiana; Bradley Byrne, Alabama; Dave Brat, Virginia; Glenn Grothman, Wisconsin; Elise Stefanik, New York; Rick W. Allen, Georgia; Jason Lewis, Minnesota; Francis Rooney, Florida; Paul Mitchell, Michigan; Tom Garrett, Virginia; Lloyd Smucker, Pennsylvania; Drew Ferguson, Georgia; Ron Estes, Kansas; Karen Handel, Georgia	Bobby Scott, Virginia, Ranking Member; Susan Davis, California; Raúl Grijalva, Arizona; Joe Courtney, Connecticut; Marcia Fudge, Ohio; Jared Polis, Colorado; Gregorio Sablan, Northern Mariana Islands; Frederica Wilson, Florida; Suzanne Bonamici, Oregon, Vice Ranking Member; Mark Takano, California; Alma Adams, North Carolina; Mark DeSaulnier, California; Donald Norcross, New Jersey; Lisa Blunt Rochester, Delaware; Raja Krishnamoorthi, Illinois; Carol Shea-Porter, New Hampshire; Adriano Espaillat, New York

Sources: H.Res. 6 (Chair), H.Res. 7 (Ranking Member), H.Res. 45 (D), H.Res. 51 (R), H.Res. 59 (D), H.Res. 131 (R)

=== 116th Congress ===
Majority	Minority
Bobby Scott, Virginia, Chair; Susan Davis, California; Raúl Grijalva, Arizona; Joe Courtney, Connecticut; Marcia Fudge, Ohio; Gregorio Sablan, Northern Mariana Islands; Frederica Wilson, Florida; Suzanne Bonamici, Oregon; Mark Takano, California; Alma Adams, North Carolina; Mark DeSaulnier, California; Donald Norcross, New Jersey; Pramila Jayapal, Washington; Joseph Morelle, New York; Susan Wild, Pennsylvania; Josh Harder, California; Lucy McBath, Georgia; Kim Schrier, Washington; Lauren Underwood, Illinois; Jahana Hayes, Connecticut; Donna Shalala, Florida; Andy Levin, Michigan, Vice Chair; Ilhan Omar, Minnesota; David Trone, Maryland; Haley Stevens, Michigan; Susie Lee, Nevada; Joaquin Castro, Texas; Lori Trahan, Massachusetts	Virginia Foxx, North Carolina, Ranking Member; Phil Roe, Tennessee; Glenn Thompson, Pennsylvania; Tim Walberg, Michigan; Brett Guthrie, Kentucky; Bradley Byrne, Alabama; Glenn Grothman, Wisconsin; Elise Stefanik, New York; Rick W. Allen, Georgia; Lloyd Smucker, Pennsylvania; Jim Banks, Indiana; Mark Walker, North Carolina; James Comer, Kentucky; Ben Cline, Virginia; Russ Fulcher, Idaho; Van Taylor, Texas; Steve Watkins, Kansas; Ron Wright, Texas; Dan Meuser, Pennsylvania; Dusty Johnson, South Dakota; Fred Keller, Pennsylvania (since July 10, 2019); Greg Murphy, North Carolina (since September 26, 2019); Jeff Van Drew, New Jersey (since January 16, 2020)

Sources: H.Res. 24 (Chair), H.Res. 25 (Ranking Member), H.Res. 42 (D), H.Res. 68 (R), H.Res. 73 (D), H.Res. 481 (R), H.Res. 596 (R), H.Res. 801 (R)

Subcommittees

As of 2019:

Subcommittee	Chair	Ranking Member
Civil Rights and Human Services	Suzanne Bonamici (D-OR)	James Comer (R-KY)
Early Childhood, Elementary and Secondary Education	Gregorio Sablan (I-MP)	Rick W. Allen (R-GA)
Health, Employment, Labor, and Pensions	Frederica Wilson (D-FL)	Tim Walberg (R-MI)
Higher Education and Workforce Investment	Susan Davis (D-CA)	Lloyd Smucker (R-PA)
Workforce Protections	Alma Adams (D-NC)	Bradley Byrne (R-AL)

=== 117th Congress ===
Majority	Minority
Bobby Scott, Virginia, Chair; Raúl Grijalva, Arizona; Joe Courtney, Connecticut; Gregorio Sablan, Northern Mariana Islands; Frederica Wilson, Florida; Suzanne Bonamici, Oregon; Mark Takano, California; Alma Adams, North Carolina; Mark DeSaulnier, California; Donald Norcross, New Jersey; Pramila Jayapal, Washington; Joseph Morelle, New York; Susan Wild, Pennsylvania; Lucy McBath, Georgia; Jahana Hayes, Connecticut; Andy Levin, Michigan; Ilhan Omar, Minnesota; Haley Stevens, Michigan; Teresa Leger Fernandez, New Mexico; Mondaire Jones, New York; Kathy Manning, North Carolina; Frank J. Mrvan, Indiana; Jamaal Bowman, New York, Vice Chair; Sheila Cherfilus-McCormick, Florida (since February 2, 2022); Mary Peltola, Alaska (since September 29, 2022); Mark Pocan, Wisconsin; Joaquin Castro, Texas; Mikie Sherrill, New Jersey; John Yarmuth, Kentucky; Adriano Espaillat, New York; Kweisi Mfume, Maryland (since February 11, 2021)	Virginia Foxx, North Carolina, Ranking Member; Joe Wilson, South Carolina; Glenn Thompson, Pennsylvania; Tim Walberg, Michigan; Glenn Grothman, Wisconsin; Elise Stefanik, New York; Rick W. Allen, Georgia; Jim Banks, Indiana; James Comer, Kentucky; Russ Fulcher, Idaho; Ron Wright, Texas (until February 7, 2021); Fred Keller, Pennsylvania; Greg Murphy, North Carolina; Mariannette Miller-Meeks, Iowa; Michelle Steel, California; Burgess Owens, Utah; Bob Good, Virginia; Lisa McClain, Michigan; Marjorie Taylor Greene, Georgia (until February 4, 2021); Diana Harshbarger, Tennessee; Mary Miller, Illinois; Victoria Spartz, Indiana; Scott L. Fitzgerald, Wisconsin; Madison Cawthorn, North Carolina; Kelly Armstrong, North Dakota; Brad Finstad, Minnesota (since September 13, 2022); Joe Sempolinski, New York (since September 13, 2022)

Resolutions electing members: H.Res. 9 (Chair), H.Res. 10 (Ranking Member), H.Res. 62 (D), H.Res. 63 (R), H.Res. 72 (removing Rep. Greene), H.Res. 92 (D), H.Res. 111 (D), H.Res. 311 (R), H.Res. 902 (D), H.Res. 1340 (R), H.Res. 1404 (D)

Subcommittees

Subcommittee	Chair	Ranking Member
Civil Rights and Human Services	Suzanne Bonamici (D-OR)	Russ Fulcher (R-ID)
Early Childhood, Elementary and Secondary Education	Gregorio Sablan (I-MP)	Burgess Owens (R-UT)
Health, Employment, Labor and Pensions	Mark DeSaulnier (D-CA)	Rick W. Allen (R-GA)
Higher Education and Workforce Investment	Frederica Wilson (D-FL)	Greg Murphy (R-NC)
Workforce Protections	Alma Adams (D-NC)	Fred Keller (R-PA)

=== 118th Congress ===
Majority	Minority
Virginia Foxx, North Carolina, Chair; Joe Wilson, South Carolina; Glenn Thompson, Pennsylvania; Tim Walberg, Michigan; Glenn Grothman, Wisconsin; Elise Stefanik, New York; Rick Allen, Georgia; Jim Banks, Indiana; James Comer, Kentucky; Lloyd Smucker, Pennsylvania; Burgess Owens, Utah; Bob Good, Virginia; Lisa McClain, Michigan; Mary Miller, Illinois; Michelle Steel, California; Ron Estes, Kansas; Julia Letlow, Louisiana; Kevin Kiley, California; Aaron Bean, Florida; Eric Burlison, Missouri; Nathaniel Moran, Texas; John James, Michigan; Lori Chavez-DeRemer, Oregon; Brandon Williams, New York; Erin Houchin, Indiana	Bobby Scott, Virginia, Ranking Member; Raúl Grijalva, Arizona; Joe Courtney, Connecticut; Gregorio Sablan, Northern Mariana Islands; Frederica Wilson, Florida; Suzanne Bonamici, Oregon; Mark Takano, California; Alma Adams, North Carolina; Mark DeSaulnier, California; Donald Norcross, New Jersey; Pramila Jayapal, Washington; Susan Wild, Pennsylvania; Lucy McBath, Georgia; Jahana Hayes, Connecticut; Ilhan Omar, Minnesota; Haley Stevens, Michigan; Teresa Leger Fernandez, New Mexico; Kathy Manning, North Carolina; Frank J. Mrvan, Indiana; Jamaal Bowman, New York

Resolutions electing members: H.Res. 14 (Chair), H.Res. 15 (Ranking Member), H.Res. 80 (R), H.Res. 87 (D)

Subcommittees

Subcommittee	Chair	Ranking Member
Early Childhood, Elementary and Secondary Education	Aaron Bean (R-FL)	Suzanne Bonamici (D-OR)
Health, Employment, Labor, and Pensions	Bob Good (R-VA)	Mark Desaulnier (D-CA)
Higher Education and Workforce Investment	Burgess Owens (R-UT)	Frederica Wilson (D-FL)
Workforce Protections	Kevin Kiley (R-CA)	Alma Adams (D-NC)

== See also ==
- Employee Free Choice Act
- List of United States House of Representatives committees
