= Mary Miller (politician) =

American politician (born 1959)

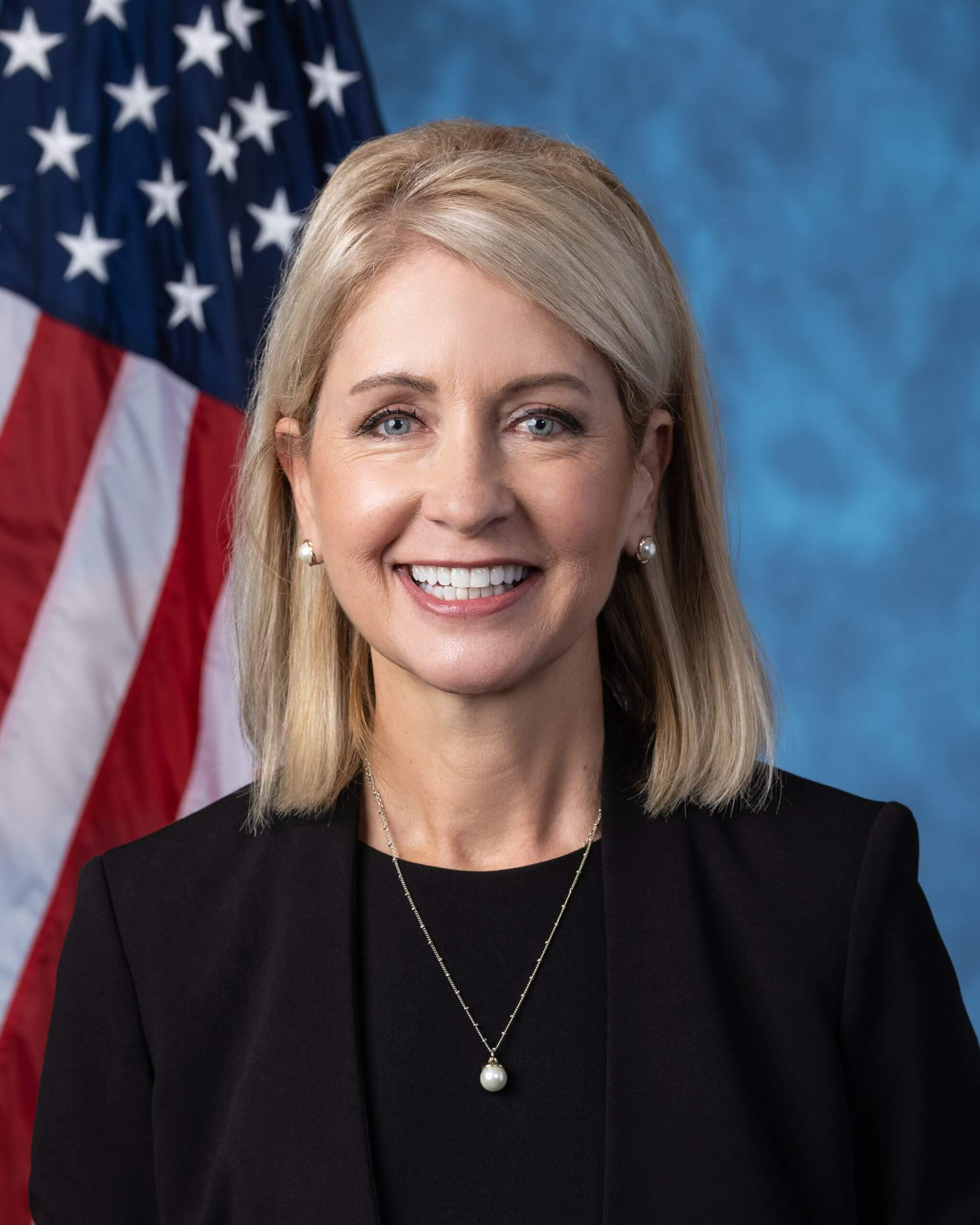
- Official portrait, 2021

Member of the U.S. House of Representatives from Illinois's 15th district
- Incumbent
- Assumed office January 3, 2021
- Preceded by: John Shimkus

Personal details
- Born: Mary Elizabeth Meyer; August 7, 1959 (age 67) Oak Park, Illinois, U.S.
- Party: Republican
- Spouse: Chris Miller (m. 1980)
- Children: 7
- Education: Eastern Illinois University (BS)
- Website: House website Campaign website

Mary Elizabeth Miller (née Meyer; born August 7, 1959) is an American far-right politician and farmer serving as the U.S. representative for Illinois's 15th congressional district since 2021. A member of the Republican Party, she serves on the House Committee on Agriculture, the Committee on Education & Labor, and the Committee on House Administration.

== Early life and education ==
Born in Oak Park, Illinois, to Annette (née Jesh) and Harvey Meyer, Miller graduated from Naperville Central High School in Naperville, Illinois. She earned a Bachelor of Science in business management and did graduate coursework in education at Eastern Illinois University.

== U.S. House of Representatives ==
=== Elections ===
==== 2020 ====
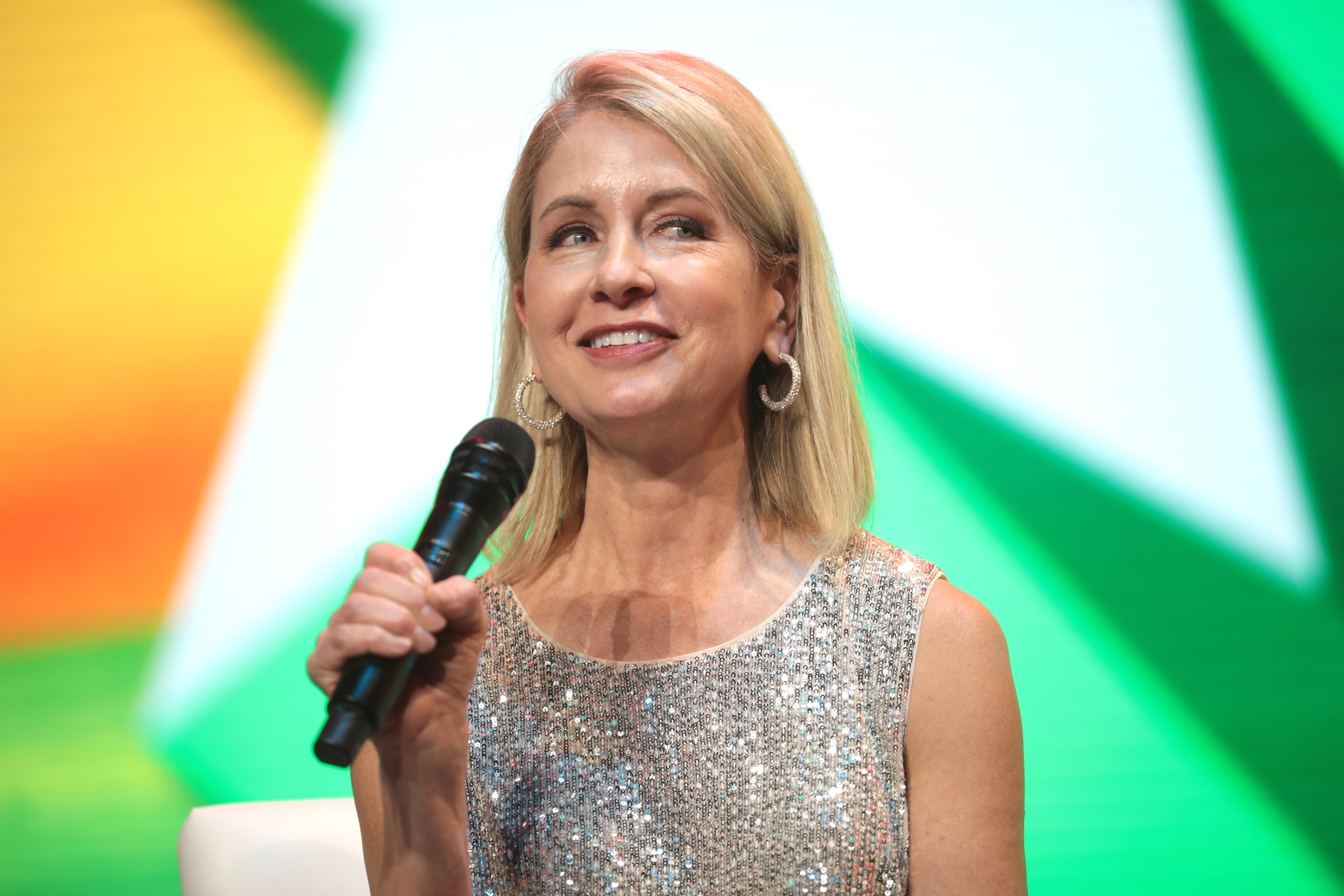
Miller speaking at a Turning Point USA event in 2020

Miller announced her candidacy to represent Illinois's 15th congressional district in the United States House of Representatives in the 2020 elections to succeed retiring incumbent John Shimkus. She won the Republican Party nomination, the real contest in Illinois's most Republican district, and won the general election with over 70% of the vote. Miller focused her campaign on providing support to farming and bringing manufacturing back to Illinois.

Miller sided with President Donald Trump's false claims that the 2020 presidential election was compromised by voter fraud, calling it "tainted".

==== 2022 ====
In May 2022, the Washington Examiner criticized Miller for employing Bradley Graven, "a man convicted of soliciting sex with a minor, to assist with her re-election campaign." Graven was also seen driving Miller around, raised money for her campaign, and was reportedly responsible for collecting over half the signatures needed to qualify her for the ballot.

After the 2020 redrawing of the Illinois electoral map, Miller won the June 2022 Republican primary by approximately 14 points against fellow incumbent Rodney Davis, whose more moderate views became a liability in the newly redrawn 15th district. Miller had also been endorsed by Donald Trump; Davis had supported the ultimately unsuccessful formation of a January 6 commission in May 2021. Redistricting left her home in Oakland just outside the district. Members of the House are required only to live in the state they represent.

==== 2024 ====
Miller won the Republican primary election unopposed. She also won the general election unopposed, as there were no Democratic, independent, or third-party candidates.

==== 2026 ====
Miller defeated two challengers in the Republican primary election in March, 2026. She will face Democratic candidate Jennifer Todd in the general election.

=== Tenure ===
On January 6, 2021, when Congress met to formally count the votes of the Electoral College and certify the results of the 2020 presidential election, Miller was one of the members of the House of Representatives who objected to the votes of Arizona and Pennsylvania.

In June 2025, Miller spoke out against a Sikh granthi leading the House of Representatives' daily prayer. Initially misidentifying the granthi as Muslim, Miller posted on X that it was "deeply troubling that a Muslim was allowed to lead prayer in the House of Representatives this morning. This should have never been allowed to happen. America was founded as a Christian nation, and I believe our government should reflect that truth, not drift further from it." Miller subsequently corrected her post to identify the granthi as Sikh before deleting the post altogether.

=== Committee assignments ===
For the 119th Congress:

- Committee on Agriculture
  - Subcommittee on Conservation, Research, and Biotechnology
  - Subcommittee on General Farm Commodities, Risk Management, and Credit
  - Subcommittee on Livestock, Dairy, and Poultry
  - Subcommittee on Nutrition and Foreign Agriculture
- Committee on Education and Workforce
  - Subcommittee on Early Childhood, Primary, and Secondary Education
  - Subcommittee on Workforce Protections
- Committee on House Administration
  - Subcommittee on Elections
- Joint Committee on Printing

=== Caucus memberships ===
- Freedom Caucus
- Republican Study Committee
- Sharia-Free America Caucus

== Political positions ==
Miller is a member of the Freedom Caucus and has been described as being on the "far right" of the Republican Party.

=== President Biden and the Biden administration ===
Miller has accused President Joe Biden of having a plan to "flood our country with terrorists, fentanyl, child traffickers, and MS-13 gang members", and also said that "under President Biden's leadership the left has weaponized the federal government to go after the American people. We face an unprecedented assault on the American way of life by the radical left."

Miller has supported efforts to impeach Biden. During the 117th Congress, Miller was co-sponsor of four resolutions to impeach Biden.

During the 117th Congress, Miller also co-sponsored resolutions to impeach Attorney General Merrick Garland and Secretary of State Antony Blinken. In the 118th Congress, she has co-sponsored resolutions to impeach Homeland Security Secretary Alejandro Mayorkas and Vice President Kamala Harris.

=== Comment about Hitler ===
On January 5, 2021, two days into her House term, Miller issued a prepared speech to the conservative group Moms for America. She quoted Adolf Hitler, saying, "Each generation has the responsibility to teach and train the next generation. You know, if we win a few elections, we're still going to be losing unless we win the hearts and minds of our children. This is the battle. Hitler was right on one thing: he said, 'Whoever has the youth has the future.'"

A number of groups and politicians condemned the comment, criticized Miller, and urged the Republican Party to do likewise. Illinois GOP chairman Tim Schneider called her language "wrong and disgusting" and urged Miller "to apologize". Public statements were issued by the U.S. Holocaust Memorial Museum, Anti-Defamation League (ADL), World Jewish Congress, and multiple lawmakers, including Adam Kinzinger and Illinois governor J. B. Pritzker. U.S. representative Jan Schakowsky, U.S. senator Tammy Duckworth, and the Illinois legislative Jewish caucus called for Miller's resignation. On January 14, Schakowsky said that she would introduce a measure to censure Miller. ADL Midwest regional director David Goldenberg shared with Miller's office a list of 12 anti-Semitic incidents and 17 instances of white supremacist propaganda in the 15th district in 2019 and 2020 in an effort to make Miller aware of "what was going on in and around her district", he said, including information about extremist activity.

On January 7, Miller's office tweeted that her remarks had been intended to compare alleged youth indoctrination efforts by "left-wing radicals" to those of Hitler, while nonetheless encouraging Republicans to aggressively appeal to the youth as a means to collective power. On January 8, Miller apologized for having quoted Hitler in the message, but accused critics of twisting her words.

=== LGBT rights ===
In March 2021, Miller introduced the Safety and Opportunity for Girls Act, which would ban transgender girls in schools from using bathrooms other than those of their sex assigned at birth.

Miller criticized House speaker Nancy Pelosi (D-California) on the Equality Act, which would prohibit discrimination on the basis of sexual orientation and gender identity, saying, "She doesn't represent the American people, and Americans need to wake up and realize that the Left does not represent the traditional values of the American people."

Miller voted against the Respect for Marriage Act, which codified parts of Obergefell v. Hodges. She wrote in a Facebook post, "This attacks the traditional family. All of these initiatives are deeply unpopular with the American people, and I will always vote NO against the radical agenda of the Left."

In February 2025, Miller introduced Representative Sarah McBride (D-Delaware), who is a transgender woman, by misgendering her: "The chair recognizes the gentleman from Delaware, Mr. McBride, for five minutes."

=== Capitol Police medals ===
In June 2021, Miller was one of 21 House Republicans to vote against a resolution to give the Congressional Gold Medal to police officers who defended the U.S. Capitol on January 6.

=== Foreign policy ===
==== Europe ====
In February 2022, Miller co-sponsored the Secure America's Borders First Act, which would prohibit the expenditure or obligation of military and security assistance to Ukraine over the U.S. border with Mexico.

Miller voted against H.R. 7691, the Additional Ukraine Supplemental Appropriations Act, 2022, which would provide $40 billion in emergency aid to the Ukrainian government.

Miller was one of 18 Republicans to vote against Sweden and Finland joining NATO.

==== Middle East and Africa ====
In June 2021, Miller was one of 49 House Republicans to vote to repeal the AUMF against Iraq.

Miller was one of 15 representatives to vote against H.R. 567: Trans-Sahara Counterterrorism Partnership Program Act of 2021, which would establish an interagency program to assist countries in North and West Africa to improve immediate and long-term capabilities to counter terrorist threats, and for other purposes.

In 2023, Miller was among 47 Republicans to vote in favor of H.Con.Res. 21, which directed President Joe Biden to remove U.S. troops from Syria within 180 days.

==== Myanmar ====
On March 19, 2021, Miller was one of 14 House Republicans to vote against a measure condemning the Myanmar coup d'état that overwhelmingly passed, for reasons reported to be unclear.

=== Abortion ===
On June 25, 2022, the day after the Supreme Court of the United States issued Dobbs v. Jackson Women's Health Organization, which overturned Roe v. Wade and Planned Parenthood v. Casey, Miller spoke at a rally with Donald Trump and called the decision a "historic victory for white life". Later that night, her spokesman said that Miller had misread her notes and meant to say "right to life".

=== Immigration ===
Miller sponsored Representative Brian Babin's bill, H.R.140 - Birthright Citizenship Act of 2021, which would eliminate birthright citizenship.

Miller sponsored H.R. 6202, the American Tech Workforce Act of 2021, introduced by Representative Jim Banks (R-Indiana). The legislation would establish a wage floor for the high-skill H-1B visa program, thereby significantly reducing employer dependence on the program. The bill would also eliminate the Optional Practical Training program that allows foreign graduates to stay and work in the United States.

In 2023, Miller voted for an amendment that would eliminate funding for immigration and refugee assistance.

=== Religious freedom ===
Miller has called for the return of the role of God and "Judeo-Christian principles" in public schools.

In January 2026, Miller was named as a founding member of the Sharia Free America Caucus, which seeks to ban sharia law and prohibit immigration of adherents of sharia (i.e. Muslims). In February 2026, The Council on American Islamic Relations (CAIR) quoted Miller in a statement designating the Sharia Free America Caucus an anti-Muslim hate group. CAIR stated that the agenda of the caucus "would effectively ban the practice of the world's second largest religion in the United States."

=== Family leave ===
Miller introduced and sponsored H.R.1980 - Working Families Flexibility Act of 2021. This bill would cap the accrual of any non-union employee, per year, to 160 hours of compensated time off in lieu of overtime pay (the equivalent of 20 days of working 8 hours a day, or 4 weeks if calculated by a 40-hour work week) and prohibits the interference of employers with regard to forcing an employee to take the compensated time off.

=== Unions ===
Miller sponsored H.R.6579 - Teamwork for Employees and Managers Act of 2022, which would require companies to put workers on the board. This has been described as "company unions".

=== Trade ===
During the first presidency of Donald Trump, Miller expressed support for Trump's protectionist trade policies, expressing the feeling that farmers were taken advantage of in past trade deals such as NAFTA. Miller acknowledged the negative impact of the tariffs, but stated “As a farmer, we are willing to put up with a little bit of temporary pain to end up with freer and fairer trade, and expanded markets.”

=== Environment ===
Miller denies the existence of climate change. In 2025, Miller said that "the whole climate change is a scam. God controls the climate because he controls the sun and the sun controls the weather, primarily."

=== Big Tech ===
In 2022, Miller was one of 39 Republicans to vote for the Merger Filing Fee Modernization Act of 2022, an antitrust package that would crack down on corporations for anti-competitive behavior.

=== Cannabis ===
In May 2024, Miller proposed an amendment to the US farm bill that would repeal a legal change passed in 2018 that made it easier for US farmers to grow nonintoxicating varieties of cannabis, also known as "hemp," but which also had the effect of allowing products containing cannabinoids such as delta-8 THC derived from hemp to be legally sold in the United States. In a statement, Miller said she was "proud my amendment was included to close the loophole that has allowed drug-infused THC products like Delta-8 to be sold," while the Hemp Roundtable, a lobbying group that represents US hemp farmers, referred to Miller's amendment as "hemp industry-killing."

=== 2024 Republican primary ===
Miller tweeted her endorsement for Trump the night of his campaign launch.

=== Fiscal Responsibility Act of 2023 ===
Miller was among the 71 Republicans who voted against final passage of the Fiscal Responsibility Act of 2023 in the House.

=== Support for expunging Trump's impeachments ===
In the 118th Congress, she co-sponsored a pair of resolutions meant to expunge the impeachments of Donald Trump. In the 119th Congress, she again co-sponsored resolutions to expunge Trump's impeachments.

== Personal life ==
Miller is married to state representative Chris Miller, who represents much of the eastern portion of his wife's district. They own a farm in Oakland, near Charleston, where they grow grain and raise cattle. They have seven children and 23 grandchildren. The Millers are members of Oakland Christian Church.

U.S. House of Representatives
Preceded by John Shimkus	Member of the U.S. House of Representatives from Illinois's 15th congressional district 2021–present	Incumbent
U.S. order of precedence (ceremonial)
Preceded by Lisa McClain	United States representatives by seniority 264th	Succeeded by Mariannette Miller-Meeks
