= Andy Levin =

American politician (born 1960)

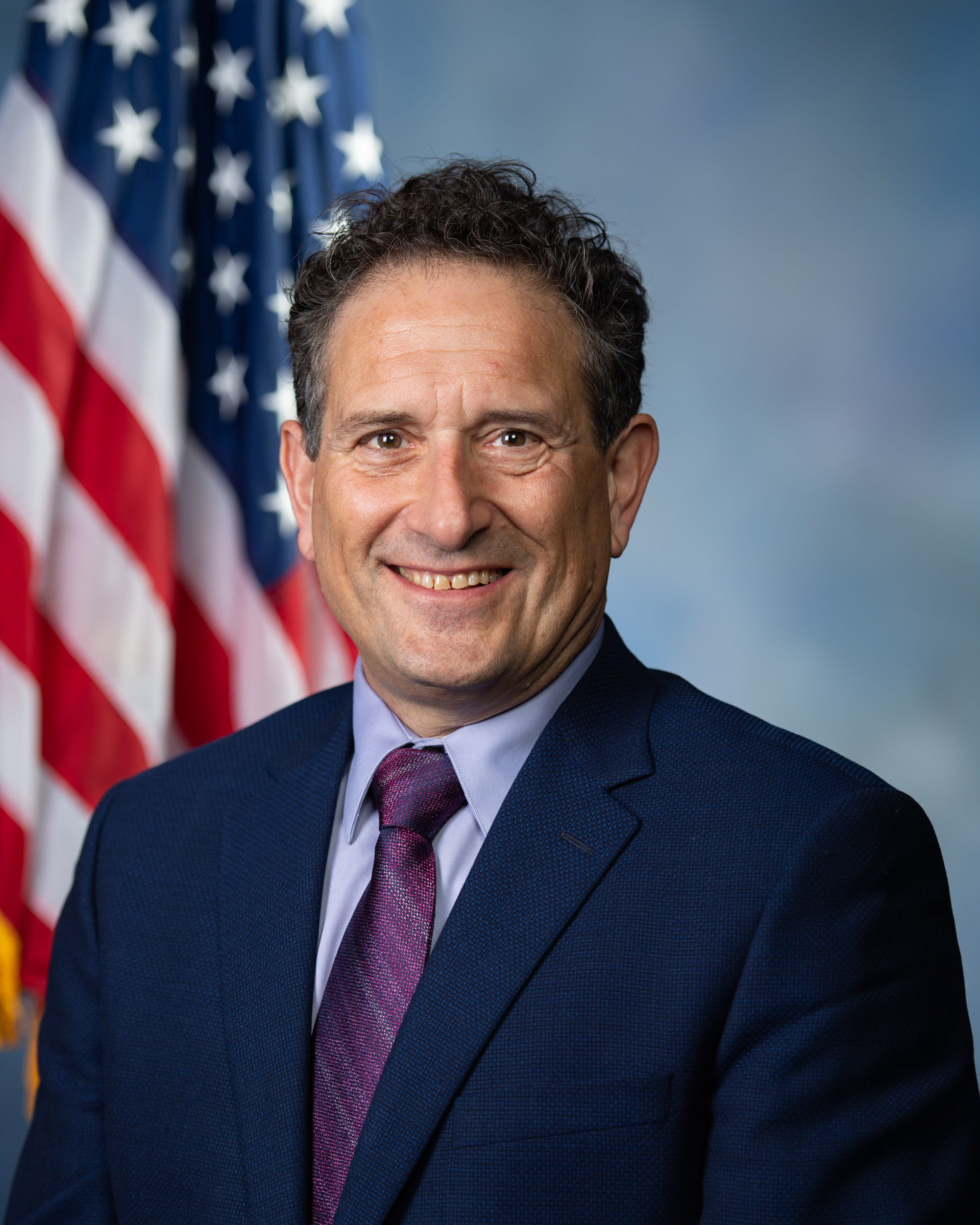
- Official portrait, 2019

Member of the U.S. House of Representatives from Michigan's 9th district
- In office January 3, 2019 – January 3, 2023
- Preceded by: Sander Levin
- Succeeded by: Haley Stevens (redistricted)

Director of the Michigan Department of Energy, Labor, and Economic Growth
- Acting
- In office July 2010 – January 2011
- Governor: Jennifer Granholm
- Preceded by: Stanley Pruss
- Succeeded by: Steven Hilfinger

Personal details
- Born: Andrew Saul Levin; August 10, 1960 (age 66) Berkley, Michigan, U.S.
- Party: Democratic
- Spouse: Mary Freeman (m. 1991)
- Children: 4
- Relatives: Sander Levin (father); Carl Levin (uncle)
- Education: Williams College (BA); University of Michigan (MA); Harvard University (JD)
- Levin's voice Levin commemorating Leo Gerard's retirement, president of United Steelworkers. Recorded July 15, 2019

Andrew Saul Levin (born August 10, 1960) is an American union organizer, human rights activist, attorney, and politician who served as the U.S. representative from Michigan's 9th congressional district from 2019 to 2023. A member of the Democratic Party, Levin was elected to the House in 2018, succeeding his retiring father, Sander Levin. He is the nephew of the late Carl Levin, formerly Michigan's U.S. senator from 1979 to 2015.

== Early life and education ==
Levin was born on August 10, 1960, to parents Sander Levin and Vicki (Schlafer) Levin. Andy grew up in Berkley, Michigan, with two sisters, Jennifer and Madeleine, and a brother, Matthew.

Levin earned a bachelor's degree in Religion with honors at Williams College in 1983. He earned a master's degree in Asian Languages and Culture from the University of Michigan, where he was a Mellon Fellow in the Humanities. He also earned a Juris Doctor with honors at Harvard Law School.

Levin was a student activist at all three institutions. At Williams, he participated in demonstrations against nuclear weapons and extending the life of a nearby nuclear power plant, supported striking workers at a nearby factory that made the caps and gowns used by the college in graduation ceremonies, and served as an organizer for the Williams Anti-Apartheid Coalition (WAAC), which demanded that the college endowment divest of stocks in companies doing business in South Africa and launched a weeklong hunger strike that garnered national attention for the issue.

At the University of Michigan, Levin was active in human rights work in Tibet and China and in Israel and Palestine. He traveled to India and China as part of his studies, and he was in Chengdu during the Tiananmen Square Massacre on June 4, 1989. On his return trip to the U.S. he interviewed the Dalai Lama in Los Angeles. He published accounts and photographs of the violent crackdown against democracy demonstrators in Chengdu, and a news article about, as well as an interview with, the Dalai Lama, who won the Nobel Peace Prize a few months later.

Levin helped organize and participated in an interfaith delegation to Israel and Palestine in 1990 and wrote and spoke about the negative effects of the occupation of the Palestinian Territories for both Israelis and Palestinians.

At Harvard, Levin served as President of the Harvard Labor Law Project and the organizer of the Sojourner Truth Squad, which advocated for the hiring of a more diverse faculty for the law school and garnered press attention in the Harvard Law Record and Boston Globe. During his first summer of law school, Levin worked for Human Rights Watch traveling throughout the Haitian countryside interviewing people in hiding during the repression after President Jean-Bertrand Aristide was overthrown in 1992. His work resulted in a book-length report, Silencing a People.

== Early career ==
Upon graduating from Williams College, Levin spent five years working with Service Employees International Union (SEIU) to organize nursing home workers, first in Michigan and then in Massachusetts. After graduating from law school, he served as the staff attorney for the U.S. Commission on the Future of Worker-Management Relations in 1994 and worked in the office of Secretary of Labor Robert Reich on policy matters, particularly protecting the 40-hour work week after Newt Gingrich pledged to weaken it as part of his "Contract with America" in the 1994 election. Levin then ran the field effort of John Sweeney's successful campaign to become president of the national AFL-CIO, and from 1995-2006 Levin served as Assistant Director of Organizing there. Among his accomplishments were founding and running Union Summer in 1996 and creating and running the Voice@Work Campaign to make the freedom to form unions a more widely recognized human right in the United States.

Levin returned home to Michigan in 2006 and ran as a Democrat for the 13th district seat in the Michigan State Senate that fall. He lost to Republican John Pappageorge by 0.6% of the vote.

In 2007, Governor Jennifer Granholm appointed Levin deputy director in the Michigan Department of Energy, Labor, and Economic Growth (DELEG) and later named him the state's first Chief Workforce Officer. He devised and oversaw the "No Worker Left Behind" program, which put over 160,000 unemployed and underemployed Michigan workers back to school to earn certificates and degrees during the auto industry implosion and Great Recession. In 2010, Granholm named him Acting Director of DELEG. Levin remained in the role for the first two months of 2011 at the request of Governor Rick Snyder, until the new governor could reorganize the department, which included a wide range of functions.

After leaving state government, Levin founded the clean energy firm Levin Energy Partners LLC and a statewide commercial property assessed clean energy program called Lean & Green Michigan.

Throughout his career, Levin has written widely about human rights, immigration, workers' rights to organize unions, AIDS and other issues.

== U.S. House of Representatives ==
=== Elections ===
==== 2018 ====
Levin ran to succeed his father in the U.S. House of Representatives in Michigan's 9th congressional district. He defeated former State Representative Ellen Lipton and attorney Martin Brook in the primary election with 52.5% of the vote. Levin defeated Republican businesswoman Candius Stearns in the general election.

==== 2020 ====
Levin ran for a second term in 2020. He defeated Republican Charles Langworthy and several minor candidates, with 57.8% of the vote.

==== 2022 ====
In the 2022 Democratic primary, Levin lost to fellow incumbent Democrat Haley Stevens. As a result of redistricting, Michigan had lost a seat in the House of Representatives, which resulted in Stevens' and Levin's districts being combined, with the new district containing more of Stevens' original voters.

Although Levin supported the Jewish right to self-determination in Israel, he was opposed by the American Israel Public Affairs Committee (AIPAC), which provided $4.5 million for a negative advertising campaign against his candidacy. Levin retorted, "AIPAC can’t stand the idea that I am the clearest, strongest Jewish voice in Congress standing for a simple proposition: that there is no way to have a secure, democratic homeland for the Jewish people unless we achieve the political and human rights of the Palestinian people."

=== Tenure ===
In November 2020, The New York Times reported rumors that Levin was considered a possible candidate for Secretary of Labor in the Biden administration; Mayor of Boston Marty Walsh was ultimately named to the post in 2021. He supports workplace measures and potential unionization of congressional staff.

Levin was particularly active on climate, labor, peace and economic justice issues in Congress. Education and Labor Committee Chairman Bobby Scott and Speaker Nancy Pelosi tapped Levin to help lead the effort to pass the Protecting the Right to Organize (PRO) Act through the House in 2019. Levin gave the culminating speech on the House Floor before the final vote and the Democrats' Weekly Address after successful passage. Levin authored the legislation that allowed House members' own staff to organize unions, which passed on May 11, 2022. Levin's own staff were the first to form a union and the first to successfully negotiate a union contract in the history of the U.S. Congress.

Levin introduced multiple pieces of climate change legislation, including the EV Freedom Act with AOC, the Build Green Act with Elizabeth Warren. Levin was active on foreign policy, particularly regarding Haiti. Levin organized a Haiti Caucus and recruited colleagues Yvette Clarke, Val Demings and Ayanna Pressley to co-chair it with him.

=== Committee assignments ===
- Committee on Education and Labor (Vice Chair)
  - Subcommittee on Health, Employment, Labor, and Pensions
  - Subcommittee on Higher Education and Workforce Investment
- Committee on Foreign Affairs
  - Subcommittee on Asia, the Pacific and Nonproliferation (Vice Chair)
  - Subcommittee on the Western Hemisphere, Civilian Security and Trade

=== Caucus memberships ===
- Congressional Progressive Caucus (Deputy Whip)
- Medicare for All Caucus
- House Pro-Choice Caucus

== Electoral history ==
Michigan's 9th District Democratic primary results, 2018
Party	Candidate	Votes	%
Democratic	Andy Levin	49,612	52.4
Democratic	Ellen Lipton	40,174	42.5
Democratic	Martin Brook	4,865	5.1
Total votes		94,651	100.0

Michigan's 9th congressional district, 2018
Party	Candidate	Votes	%
Democratic	Andy Levin	181,734	59.7
Republican	Candius Stearns	112,123	36.8
Working Class	Andrea Kirby	6,797	2.2
Green	John McDermott	3,909	1.3
Total votes		304,563	100.0
Democratic hold			

Michigan's 9th congressional district, 2020
Party	Candidate	Votes	%
Democratic	Andy Levin	230,318	57.7
Republican	Charles Langworthy	153,296	38.4
Working Class	Andrea Kirby	8,970	2.2
Libertarian	Mike Saliba	6,532	1.6
Total votes		399,116	100.0
Democratic hold			

Democratic primary results, Michigan's 11th congressional district, 2022
Party	Candidate	Votes	%
Democratic	Haley Stevens	70,508	59.91
Democratic	Andy Levin	47,117	40.04
Total votes		117,681	100.0

== Post-Congress ==
After leaving Congress in January 2023, Levin served as a Distinguished Senior Fellow at the Center for American Progress for two years. He returned to Lean & Green Michigan as Founder & Chief Strategist. As of early 2026, Lean & Green Michigan had grown to include 62 local governments representing 85% of all Michiganders and had facilitated $315M of private financing for 89 water and energy efficiency and renewable energy projects on commercial and industrial buildings all over the state. Levin also began consulting on energy, climate change, environmental and labor matters for progressive organizations and creative companies.

In January 2026, Levin and his wife Mary Freeman became majority owners of Stokely Creek Lodge in Goulais River, Ontario.

== Personal life ==
Levin and his wife Mary Freeman have four adult children and live in Bloomfield Township, Michigan. Levin is active in his synagogue. He plays ice hockey, does Iyengar yoga, and is devoted to all manner of outdoor activity, including mountain biking, snowshoeing, cross country skiing, hiking, and wilderness adventure, particularly in a canoe.

== See also ==
- 2022 United States House of Representatives elections in Michigan
- List of Jewish members of the United States Congress

U.S. House of Representatives
Preceded by Sander Levin	Member of the U.S. House of Representatives from Michigan's 9th congressional district 2019–2023	Succeeded by Lisa McClain
U.S. order of precedence (ceremonial)
Preceded by Dave Trott as Former U.S. Representative	Order of precedence of the United States as Former U.S. Representative	Succeeded by Bill Grant as Former U.S. Representative
