= Glenn Thompson (politician) =

American politician (born 1959)

Chair of the House Agriculture Committee
- Incumbent
- Assumed office January 3, 2023
- Preceded by: David Scott

Ranking Member of the House Agriculture Committee
- In office January 3, 2021 – January 3, 2023
- Preceded by: Mike Conaway
- Succeeded by: David Scott

Member of the U.S. House of Representatives from Pennsylvania's 15th district
- Incumbent
- Assumed office January 3, 2009
- Preceded by: John E. Peterson
- Constituency: 5th district (2009–2019); 15th district (2019–present)

Personal details
- Born: Glenn William Thompson Jr. July 27, 1959 (age 67) Bellefonte, Pennsylvania, U.S.
- Party: Republican
- Spouse: Penny Ammerman
- Children: 3
- Education: Pennsylvania State University (BS); Temple University (MEd)
- Website: House website Campaign website
- Thompson's voice Thompson on the milk industry. Recorded May 28, 2023

Glenn William "GT" Thompson Jr. (born July 27, 1959) is an American politician serving in the U.S. House of Representatives since 2009, representing Pennsylvania's 5th congressional district until 2019 and Pennsylvania's 15th congressional since then. He is a member of the Republican Party.

Thompson was first elected to Congress in 2008. He is a member of the moderate Republican Governance Group. Since 2023, he has chaired the House Agriculture Committee.

After Senator Bob Casey Jr. lost re-election, Thompson became the dean of the Pennsylvania's congressional delegation in 2025.

== Early life, education and early career ==
Thompson was born in Bellefonte, Pennsylvania, grew up in Howard, Pennsylvania, and is the son of a Navy veteran. He holds a bachelor's degree in therapeutic recreation from Pennsylvania State University and dual master's degrees in therapeutic recreation and health science from Temple University.

Thompson worked for 28 years as a therapist/rehab services manager/licensed nursing home administrator in Lycoming County and chaired the Centre County Republican Committee for six years. He has spent 25 years as a member or president of the Howard Volunteer Fire Company 14, and volunteers as a firefighter, emergency medical technician, and rescue technician.

== U.S. House of Representatives ==
=== Tenure ===
When the 112th Congress convened on January 5, 2011, to elect a speaker of the United States House of Representatives, Thompson's vote was the 218th vote for John Boehner, giving Boehner the majority needed to be named Speaker.

During the 112th Congress, Thompson became chairman of the House Agriculture Subcommittee on Forestry, Conservation, and Energy.

At the start of the 115th Congress, Thompson was named vice-chairman of the House Committee on Agriculture. In December 2020, ahead of the 117th Congress, he was named ranking member of the agriculture committee.

==== Animal welfare ====
In 2023 and again in 2025, in response to California's Proposition 12, Thompson pushed to overturn local animal welfare laws (such as state-level room-to-move laws) via the Farm Bill. Thompson supported the 2026 Save Our Bacon Act, which would prohibit state and local governments from imposing production standards on animal products sold in interstate commerce.

==== Environment ====
Of climate change, Thompson has said, "I think humans contribute," but added that he was not sure of the degree to which they contribute. In September 2017, Thompson and several other members of Congress asked the Environmental Protection Agency (EPA) and U.S. Army Corps of Engineers to rescind the Waters of the United States rule, calling the regulation an overreach that expanded "EPA's authority far beyond its congressional mandate."

==== Government funding ====
In January 2018, Thompson voted for the Fiscal Year 2018 continuing resolution (CR), a stopgap funding bill to fund the federal government at then-current levels through February 16, 2018. It also provided for six-year funding for the Children's Health Insurance Program (CHIP). Thompson praised the measure for delaying what he called "three onerous and unpopular Obamacare taxes, which should be permanently repealed."

==== Gun control ====
After the Stoneman Douglas High School shooting in 2018, Thompson told an audience of students that he did not agree with the idea of arming teachers and had voted to fund an improved national background check system. Thompson called for more "uniformed law enforcement in our schools."

==== Immigration ====
In 2021, Thompson was one of 30 Republicans who voted for the Farm Workforce Modernization Act, which would grant legal status to illegal immigrants working in agriculture and establish a pathway to permanent residency contingent on continued farm work.

==== Marriage rights ====
In July 2022, Thompson voted against the Respect for Marriage Act, which would codify the right to same-sex marriage, just days before attending his son's same-sex wedding.

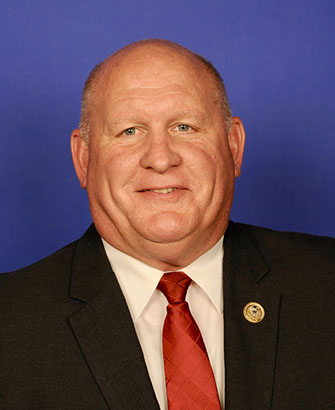
Thompson during the 116th Congress

==== Rural air service ====
In April 2018, Thompson fought efforts to eliminate federal funding for the Essential Air Service. Three airports in his district participate in it.

==== Texas v. Pennsylvania ====
In December 2020, Thompson was one of 126 Republican members of the House of Representatives to sign an amicus brief in support of Texas v. Pennsylvania, a lawsuit filed at the United States Supreme Court contesting the results of the 2020 presidential election, in which Joe Biden defeated incumbent Donald Trump. The Supreme Court declined to hear the case on the basis that Texas lacked standing under Article III of the Constitution to challenge the results of an election held by another state.

==== Trade ====
In January 2025, Thompson praised President Donald Trump's proposals to implement 25% tariffs on most goods from Canada and Mexico, saying it was an "effective tool" for "ensuring fair trade for American producers."

=== Committee assignments ===
- Committee on Agriculture (chair)
  - Subcommittee on General Farm Commodities and Risk Management
  - Subcommittee on Biotechnology, Horticulture, and Research
  - Subcommittee on Livestock and Foreign Agriculture
- Committee on Education and Labor
  - Subcommittee on Civil Rights and Human Services
  - Subcommittee on Early Childhood, Elementary and Secondary Education

=== Caucus leadership and memberships ===
- Past National Co-chair, Congressional High School Art Competition
- German-American Caucus (co-chair)
- Congressional Natural Gas Caucus (co-chair)
- Career and Technical Education Caucus (co-chair)
- Congressional Constitution Caucus
- Coal Caucus
- House Baltic Caucus
- Congressional Arts Caucus
- Congressional Motorcycle Caucus
- Congressional Western Caucus
- Veterinary Medicine Caucus
- Republican Governance Group
- Congressional Blockchain Caucus
- Rare Disease Caucus
- Scouting Caucus
- Congressional Caucus on Turkey and Turkish Americans
- Congressional Taiwan Caucus

=== Elections ===
==== 2008 ====
Thompson was elected the U.S. representative from Pennsylvania's 5th congressional district, defeating Democratic nominee Mark McCracken, 58%–42%.

==== 2010 ====
Thompson defeated Democratic nominee Michael Pipe, 69%–28%.

==== 2012 ====
Thompson defeated Democratic nominee Charles Dumas, 63%–37%.

==== 2014 ====
Thompson defeated Democratic nominee Kerith Strano Taylor, 64%–36%.

==== 2016 ====
Thompson defeated Taylor again, 67%–33%.

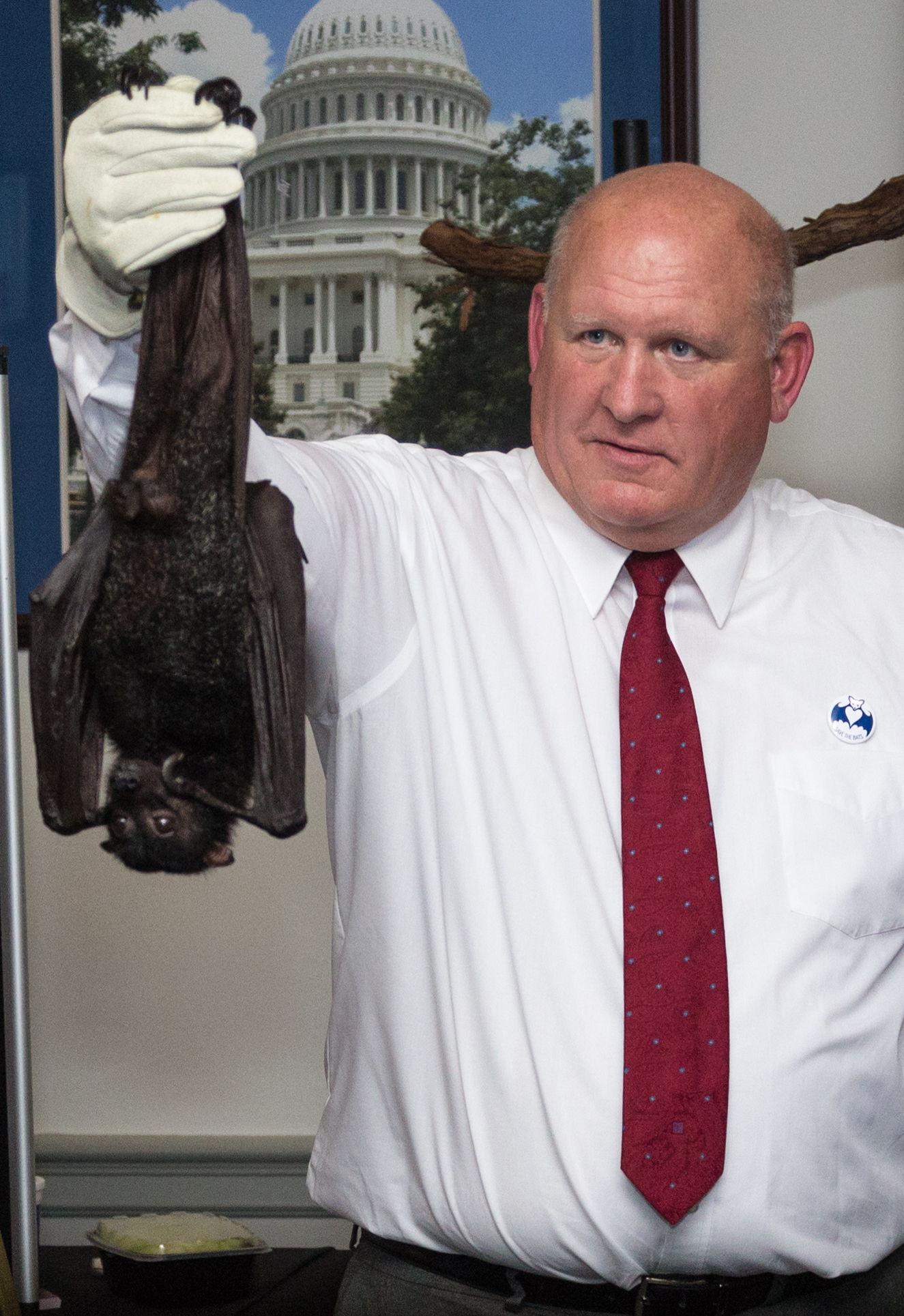
Thompson during Bat Week in 2017

==== 2018 ====
After the Pennsylvania Supreme Court redrew the congressional district map in February 2018, Thompson's district was renumbered the 15th. In May 2018, Susan Boser, a professor at Indiana University of Pennsylvania, won the Democratic nomination in Thompson's district, defeating Wade Johun in her party's primary. In the general election, Thompson defeated Boser, 68%–32%.

==== 2020 ====
Thompson defeated Democratic nominee Robert Williams, 73.5%–26.5%.

==== 2022 ====
Thompson defeated the Democratic nominee, Lewisburg Borough Council Member Mike Molesevich, 70%–30%.

==== 2024 ====
Thompson defeated the Democratic nominee, law student Zach Womer, 71.5% - 28.5%.

U.S. House of Representatives
| Preceded by John Peterson | Member of the U.S. House of Representatives from Pennsylvania's 5th congressional district 2009–2019 | Succeeded by Mary Gay Scanlon |
| Preceded by Susan Wild | Member of the U.S. House of Representatives from Pennsylvania's 15th congressional district 2019–present | Incumbent |
| Preceded by Mike Conaway | Ranking Member of the House Agriculture Committee; 2021–2023 | Succeeded by David Scott |
| Preceded by David Scott | Chair of the House Agriculture Committee; 2023–present | Incumbent |
U.S. order of precedence (ceremonial)
| Preceded by Chellie Pingree | United States representatives by seniority 70th | Succeeded by Paul Tonko |
