= Tim Walberg =

American politician (born 1951)

The Reverend Tim Walberg
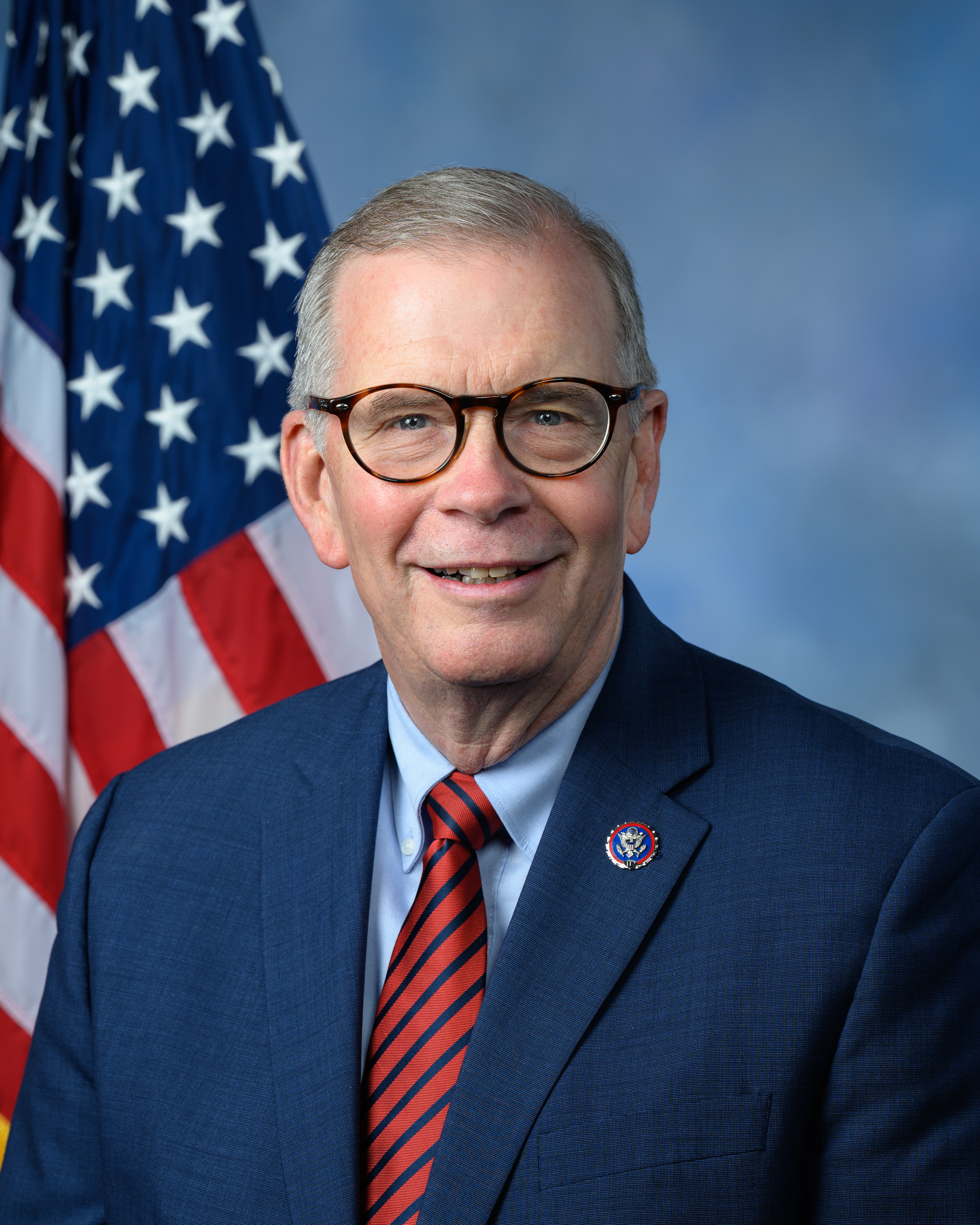
- Official portrait, 2021

Chair of the House Education Committee
- Incumbent
- Assumed office January 3, 2025
- Preceded by: Virginia Foxx

Member of the U.S. House of Representatives from Michigan
- Incumbent
- Assumed office January 3, 2011
- Preceded by: Mark Schauer
- Constituency: 7th district (2011–2023); 5th district (2023–present)
- In office January 3, 2007 – January 3, 2009
- Preceded by: Joe Schwarz
- Succeeded by: Mark Schauer
- Constituency: 7th district

Member of the Michigan House of Representatives
- In office January 3, 1983 – January 3, 1999
- Preceded by: James Hadden
- Succeeded by: Doug Spade
- Constituency: 40th district (1983–1992); 57th district (1992–1999)

Personal details
- Born: Timothy Lee Walberg; April 12, 1951 (age 75) Chicago, Illinois, U.S.
- Party: Republican
- Spouse: Susan Walberg (m. 1974)
- Children: 3
- Education: Western Illinois University (attended); Moody Bible Institute (attended); Taylor University (BA); Wheaton College (MA)
- Website: House website Campaign website
- Walberg's voice Walberg on his relationship with U.S. Rep. John Dingell. Recorded February 13, 2019

Timothy Lee Walberg (born April 12, 1951) is an American politician serving as a U.S. representative from Michigan since 2011, representing the state's 5th congressional district since 2023. A member of the Republican Party, he previously represented the 7th district from 2007 to 2009 and from 2011 to 2023 as the longest tenured member from Michigan.

Walberg is expected to become the dean of Michigan's congressional delegation when Senator Gary Peters retires in 2027.

== Early life, education, and early career ==
Walberg was born and raised in Chicago, Illinois, the son of Alice Ann and John A. Walberg. His paternal grandparents were Swedish. In 1964, Walberg served the Barry Goldwater 1964 presidential campaign as a volunteer. Walberg graduated from Thornton Fractional North High School in 1969 and briefly served the U.S. Forest Service. From 1973 to 1977, Walberg served as pastor at Grace Fellowship Church in New Haven, Indiana.

== Michigan legislature ==
Walberg was a member of the Michigan House of Representatives from 1983 to 1998. He also spent time as a pastor and as a division manager for the Moody Bible Institute in Chicago while continuing to live in Michigan.

== U.S. House of Representatives ==
=== Elections ===
==== 2004 ====
After six years out of politics, Walberg ran in a field of six candidates in the 2004 Republican primary for the 7th District after six-term incumbent Nick Smith retired. Walberg finished third in the primary. State Senator Joe Schwarz won the primary and the general election.

==== 2006 ====
Walberg defeated Schwarz in the Republican primary. In the general election, he defeated Democratic nominee Sharon Renier, 50%–46%.

In 2007, there was a failed recall effort against Walberg.

==== 2008 ====
Entering the 2008 race, Democratic Congressional Campaign Committee chairman Chris Van Hollen identified Walberg as one of the most vulnerable Republican incumbents in Congress. On August 23, 2007, State Senate Minority Leader Mark Schauer announced he would challenge Walberg. The previous occupant of the seat, Joe Schwarz, who lost to Walberg in the 2006 Republican primary, declined to run but on September 30 endorsed Schauer.

Schauer narrowly defeated Walberg in the November election, 49% to 47%. Between the two candidates, around $3.5 million was spent on the campaign, making it one of the most expensive House races in the 2008 election. Schauer outspent Walberg by nearly $300,000.

==== 2010 ====
On July 14, 2009, Walberg announced that he would challenge incumbent Mark Schauer. He defeated Marvin Carlson and Brian Rooney in the Republican primary.

Polling showed the race as a dead heat. Walberg defeated Schauer, 50%–45%.

==== 2012 ====
Wahlberg defeated Democratic nominee Kurt Haskell, 53%–43%.

==== 2014 ====
Walberg defeated former Democratic State Representative Pam Byrnes with 54% of the vote.

==== 2016 ====
Walberg defeated Doug North in the August 2 Republican primary and Democratic nominee State Representative Gretchen Driskell in the general election, with 55% of the vote.

==== 2018 ====
Walberg defeated Driskell again, with 53.8% of the vote.

==== 2020 ====
Walberg defeated Driskell a third time, with 58.7% of the vote.

==== 2022 ====
Due to redistricting, Walberg, the incumbent of the 7th congressional district, faced Democratic opponent Bart Goldberg, an attorney, in the 5th congressional district. Walberg was re-elected with 62.4% of the vote.

==== 2024 ====
Walberg faced no opposition in the Republican primary. He defeated Democratic candidate Libbi Urban with 65.7% of the vote.

=== Committee assignments ===
- Committee on Education and the Workforce
  - Subcommittee on Health, Employment, Labor, and Pensions
- Committee on Energy and Commerce
  - Subcommittee on Communications and Technology
  - Subcommittee on Energy, Climate, and Grid Security
  - Vice Chair, Subcommittee on Innovation, Data, and Commerce

=== Caucus memberships ===
- Republican Study Committee
- House Baltic Caucus
- Congressional Constitution Caucus
- Congressional Coalition on Adoption
- Congressional Motorcycle Caucus Co-chair
- Congressional Taiwan Caucus
- Congressional Western Caucus

== Political positions ==
Walberg is a political conservative.

=== Environment ===
Walberg rejects the scientific consensus on climate change. On the subject, he said in May 2017, "I believe that there is a creator in God who is much bigger than us. And I'm confident that, if there's a real problem, He can take care of it."

=== Healthcare ===
Walberg has repeatedly voted to repeal the Patient Protection and Affordable Care Act. Walberg shares an office with Jackson Right to Life, which was vandalized by abortion rights activists in June 2022, just before the Dobbs v. Jackson Women's Health Organization decision. Fox News attributed the attack to the group Jane's Revenge.

=== LGBTQ rights ===
In 2015, Walberg cosponsored a resolution to amend the US constitution to ban same-sex marriage. Walberg also cosponsored a resolution disagreeing with the Supreme Court decision in Obergefell v. Hodges, which held that same-sex marriage bans violated the constitution.

Walberg voted against the Respect for Marriage Act codifying Loving v. Virginia and Obergefell v. Hodges, recognizing marriages across state lines regardless of "sex, race, ethnicity, or national origin of those individuals."

On October 8, 2023, Walberg gave a keynote speech at the National Prayer Breakfast in Uganda, at the invitation of Ugandan legislator David Bahati. Walberg's trip to Uganda was paid for by The Fellowship, which sponsored the breakfast. During his speech, Walberg urged Uganda to "stand firm" against international pressure to "change you", apparently referencing sanctions by the United States government against Uganda over the recently enacted Anti-Homosexuality Act of 2023, which prescribes lengthy prison sentences and in certain instances the death penalty for homosexual activities. "Worthless is the thought of the world, worthless, for instance, is the thought of the World Bank, or the World Health Organization, or the United Nations, or, sadly, some in our administration in America who say, 'You are wrong for standing for values that God created,' for saying there are male and female and God created them," said Walberg. Bahati, the original sponsor of the Anti-Homosexuality Act, stated that Walberg had told him "Uganda is on the right side of God," when he asked Walberg if he were comfortable associating with Bahati. Walberg additionally praised Uganda's President Yoweri Museveni, who also spoke at the breakfast, and who signed the Anti-Homosexuality Act into law.

=== 2008 presidential election ===
Walberg has repeatedly invoked birther conspiracy theories about President Barack Obama, arguing that Obama should have been impeached over his birth certificate.

=== 2020 presidential election ===
In December 2020, Walberg was one of 126 Republican members of the House of Representatives to sign an amicus brief in support of Texas v. Pennsylvania, a lawsuit filed at the United States Supreme Court contesting the results of the 2020 presidential election, in which Joe Biden defeated incumbent Donald Trump. The Supreme Court declined to hear the case on the basis that Texas lacked standing under Article III of the Constitution to challenge the results of an election held by another state.

=== Foreign policy ===
In March 2024, responding to a question about "why are we spending our money to build a port for them," referring to the Biden Administration's plan to build a temporary port off the coast of Gaza to facilitate delivery of humanitarian aid in the Gaza war, Walberg told the crowd the U.S. "shouldn't be spending a dime on humanitarian aid" and instead "should be like Nagasaki and Hiroshima. Get it over quick." The Council on American-Islamic Relations, a U.S.-based Muslim civil rights group, condemned Walberg's comments as a "clear call to genocide." Dawud Walid, Chief director of CAIR's Michigan chapter, said: "This ... should be condemned by all Americans who value human life and international law." "To call indifferently for the killing of every human being in Gaza sends a chilling message," Walid added.

Tadatoshi Akiba, a member of the Japan Council against Atomic and Hydrogen Bombs (Gensuikyo) and former mayor of Hiroshima City, and others held a press conference at City Hall on April 10. The letter of request, which was read out loud, criticized Walberg's comments, highlighting Hibakusha's radiation damage and psychological damage, and said "We regret your ignorance and insensitivity to the unjust suffering and human misery that occurred as a result of the atomic bombings." Japanese Diet member Jin Matsubara criticized the event as a "defeat for diplomacy". In response, Japanese Foreign Minister Yoko Kamikawa stated that she was not considering protesting.

In response, Walberg denied advocating the use of nuclear weapons, claiming that he merely "used a metaphor to convey the need for both Israel and Ukraine to win their wars as swiftly as possible" despite his reference to the US dropping atomic bombs on two Japanese cities to bring an end to WWII.

Walberg also opposes humanitarian aid to Ukraine in the Russo-Ukrainian War. "Instead [of] 80 percent in Ukraine being used for humanitarian purposes, it should be 80 [to] 100 percent to wipe out Russia — if that's what we want to do." Walberg also voted against aid to Ukraine in 2022.

== Electoral history ==
2004 election for the U.S. House of Representatives – 7th District Republican primary

- Joe Schwarz (R), 28%
- Brad Smith (R), 22%
- Tim Walberg (R), 18%
- Clark Bisbee (R), 14%
- Gene DeRossett (R), 11%
- Paul DeWeese (R), 7%

2006 election for the U.S. House of Representatives – 7th District Republican primary

- Tim Walberg (R), 33,144, 53%
- Joe Schwarz (R) (inc.), 29,349, 47%

2006 election for the U.S. House of Representatives – 7th District

- Tim Walberg (R), 49.93%
- Sharon Renier (D), 45.98%
- Robert Hutchinson (L), 1.55%
- David Horn (UST), 1.47%
- Joe Schwarz (write-in), 1.07%

2008 election for the U.S. House of Representatives – 7th District

- Mark Schauer (D), 48.79%
- Tim Walberg (R), 46.49%
- Lynn Meadows (G), 2.96%
- Ken Proctor (L), 1.76%

2010 election for the U.S. House of Representatives – 7th District

- Tim Walberg (R), 50.1%
- Mark Schauer (D), 45.4%
- Other, 4.5%

2012 election for the U.S. House of Representatives – 7th District

- Tim Walberg (R), 55.4%
- Kurt Haskell (D), 44.6%

2014 election for the U.S. House of Representatives – 7th District

- Tim Walberg (R), 53.45%
- Pam Byrnes (D), 41.17%
- David Swartout, 1.95%
- Rick Strawcutter (UST), 1.40%

2016 election for the U.S. House of Representatives – 7th District

- Tim Walberg (R), 55.05%
- Gretchen Driskell (D), 40.03%
- Ken Proctor (L), 4.92%

2018 election for the U.S. House of Representatives – 7th District

- Tim Walberg (R), 53.80%
- Gretchen Driskell (D), 46.20%

2020 election for the U.S. House of Representatives – 7th District

- Tim Walberg (R), 58.75%
- Gretchen Driskell (D), 41.25%

2022 election for the U.S. House of Representatives – 5th District

- Tim Walberg (R), 62.42%
- Bart Goldberg (D), 34.97%
- Norman Peterson (L), 1.62%
- Ezra Scott (UST), 1.00%
- Write-in, 0.00%

2024 election for the U.S. House of Representatives – 5th District

- Tim Walberg (R), 65.68%
- Libbi Urban (D), 32.76%
- James Bronke (G), 1.56%

== Personal life ==
Walberg and his wife, Sue, have been married since 1974. They have three adult children: Matthew, Heidi, and Caleb.

Walberg is an ordained pastor. Ordained as a Baptist, he currently identifies as nondenominational and attends a church affiliated with the Church of the United Brethren in Christ.

U.S. House of Representatives
Preceded by Joe Schwarz	Member of the U.S. House of Representatives from Michigan's 7th congressional district 2007–2009	Succeeded by Mark Schauer
Preceded by Mark Schauer	Member of the U.S. House of Representatives from Michigan's 7th congressional district 2011–2023	Succeeded by Elissa Slotkin
Preceded by Dan Kildee	Member of the U.S. House of Representatives from Michigan's 5th congressional district 2023–present	Incumbent
Preceded by Virginia Foxx	Chair of the House Education Committee; 2025–present	Incumbent
U.S. order of precedence (ceremonial)
Preceded by John Garamendi	United States representatives by seniority 75th	Succeeded by Bill Foster
