= Lisa McClain =

American politician (born 1966)

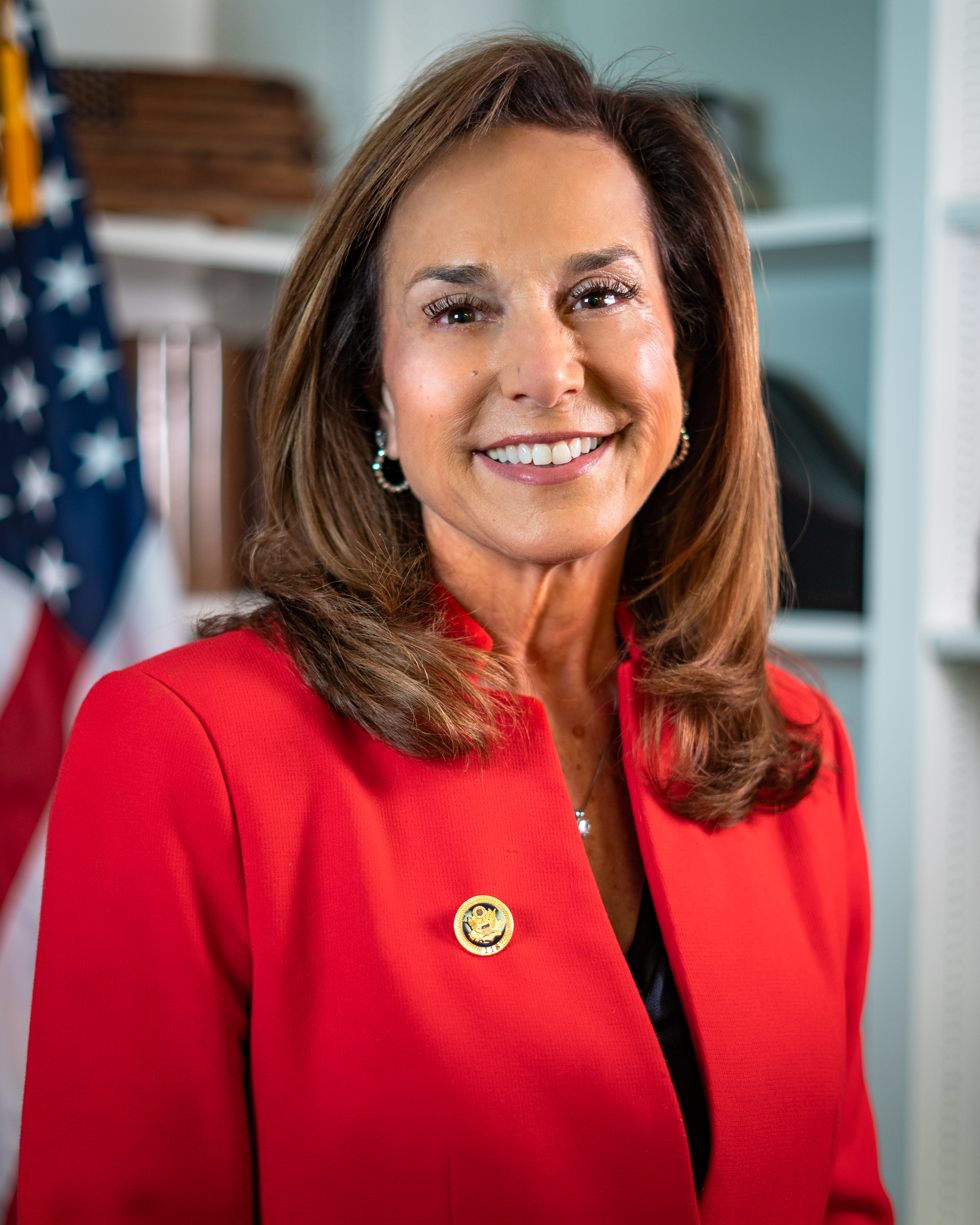
- Official portrait, 2025

Chair of the House Republican Conference
- Incumbent
- Assumed office January 3, 2025
- Leader: Mike Johnson
- Preceded by: Elise Stefanik

Secretary of the House Republican Conference
- In office January 3, 2023 – January 3, 2025
- Leader: Kevin McCarthy; Mike Johnson
- Preceded by: Richard Hudson
- Succeeded by: Erin Houchin

Member of the U.S. House of Representatives from Michigan
- Incumbent
- Assumed office January 3, 2021
- Preceded by: Paul Mitchell
- Constituency: 10th district (2021–2023); 9th district (2023–present)

Personal details
- Born: Lisa Carmella Iovannisci; April 7, 1966 (age 60) Stockbridge, Michigan, U.S.
- Party: Republican
- Spouse: Michael McClain
- Children: 4
- Education: Lansing Community College (attended); Northwood University (BBA)
- Website: House website Campaign website

Lisa Carmella McClain (née Iovannisci; born April 7, 1966) is an American politician who has represented Michigan's 9th congressional district since 2021. The district, numbered as the 10th during her first term, stretches from the outer northern suburbs of Detroit through The Thumb. A member of the Republican Party, McClain serves in congressional leadership as chair of the House Republican Conference.

== Early life and career ==
McClain was born and raised in Stockbridge, Michigan. She graduated from Stockbridge Junior / Senior High School in 1984. She attended Lansing Community College and earned her Bachelor of Business Administration from Northwood University.

McClain worked at American Express for 11 years and at the Hantz Group from 1998 to 2019.

== U.S. House of Representatives ==
=== Elections ===
==== 2020 ====
After incumbent congressman Paul Mitchell opted to retire from the United States House of Representatives, McClain announced her candidacy for Michigan's 10th congressional district. She defeated state Representative Shane Hernandez in the August 4 Republican primary and Democratic nominee Kimberly Bizon in the November 3 general election. President Donald Trump endorsed McClain.

==== 2022 ====
On February 7, former president Donald Trump endorsed Lisa McClain in the 2022 midterm elections. McClain won election to the state's redrawn 9th congressional district, defeating all other candidates with 63.9% of the vote. Democrat Brian Jaye finished second with 33.2% of the vote.

==== 2024 ====
McClain faced no primary challengers. She won the general election against Clinton St. Mosley and two third-party candidates with 66.8% of the vote.

After the election, McClain was elected by her fellow Republicans as chair of the House Republican Conference. In this position, she is the fourth-ranking House Republican behind Speaker Mike Johnson, Majority Leader Steve Scalise, and Majority Whip Tom Emmer. She is the highest-ranking Republican woman in the House.

=== Tenure ===
On December 7, 2023, Representative McClain sponsored a resolution to censure Rep. Jamaal Bowman (D-N.Y.) for pulling a fire alarm in the house on September 30 of that same year. McClain stated that Bowman "knowingly pulled a fire alarm to cause chaos and stop the House from doing business". The resolution passed by a 214–191 vote.

=== Committee assignments ===
- Committee on Armed Services
  - Subcommittee on Cyber, Information Technologies, and Innovation
  - Subcommittee on Tactical Air and Land Forces
- Committee on the Budget
- Committee on Education and the Workforce
  - Subcommittee on Early Childhood, Elementary, and Secondary Education
- Committee on Oversight and Accountability
  - Subcommittee on Economic Growth, Energy Policy, and Regulatory Affairs
  - Subcommittee on Health Care and Financial Services (chair)

=== Caucus memberships ===
- Republican Main Street Partnership
- Republican Study Committee
- House Republican Conference
- Congressional Taiwan Caucus

== Political positions ==
=== Budget and spending ===
McClain, along with all other Senate and House Republicans, voted against the American Rescue Plan Act of 2021. In 2022, McClain voted against the Inflation Reduction Act. McClain joined the majority of the House in voting to pass the Fiscal Responsibility Act of 2023 to suspend the U.S. debt ceiling.

In a 2025 interview with Politico, McClain amplified a rumor that Social Security payments were going out to people born 150 years ago. The source of this rumor was a coding-system quirk: The Social Security Administration uses a system written with the coding language COBOL. In some instances when a person's birthdate is not known, the program uses the default date May 20th, 1875, which is the date of the "Convention du Mètre” in Paris, when weights and measures were standardized.

=== Marriage ===
In 2022, McClain was one of the 157 members of Congress who voted against the Respect for Marriage Act.

=== Healthcare ===
Alongside representatives Elissa Slotkin and John Moolenaar, McClain introduced the Patient Advocate Tracker Act to broaden access to information technology pertinent to patient advocacy in the Veterans Health Administration. President Joe Biden signed the bill into law on September 16, 2022.

=== Veterans ===
In August 2021, McClain sponsored a bill to posthumously award the Congressional Gold Medal to 13 service members who were killed by a suicide bomber during the evacuation of citizens of the United States and Afghan allies at the Hamid Karzai International Airport during the withdrawal of United States troops from Afghanistan. President Biden signed the bill into law on December 16, 2021.

=== Support for Donald Trump ===
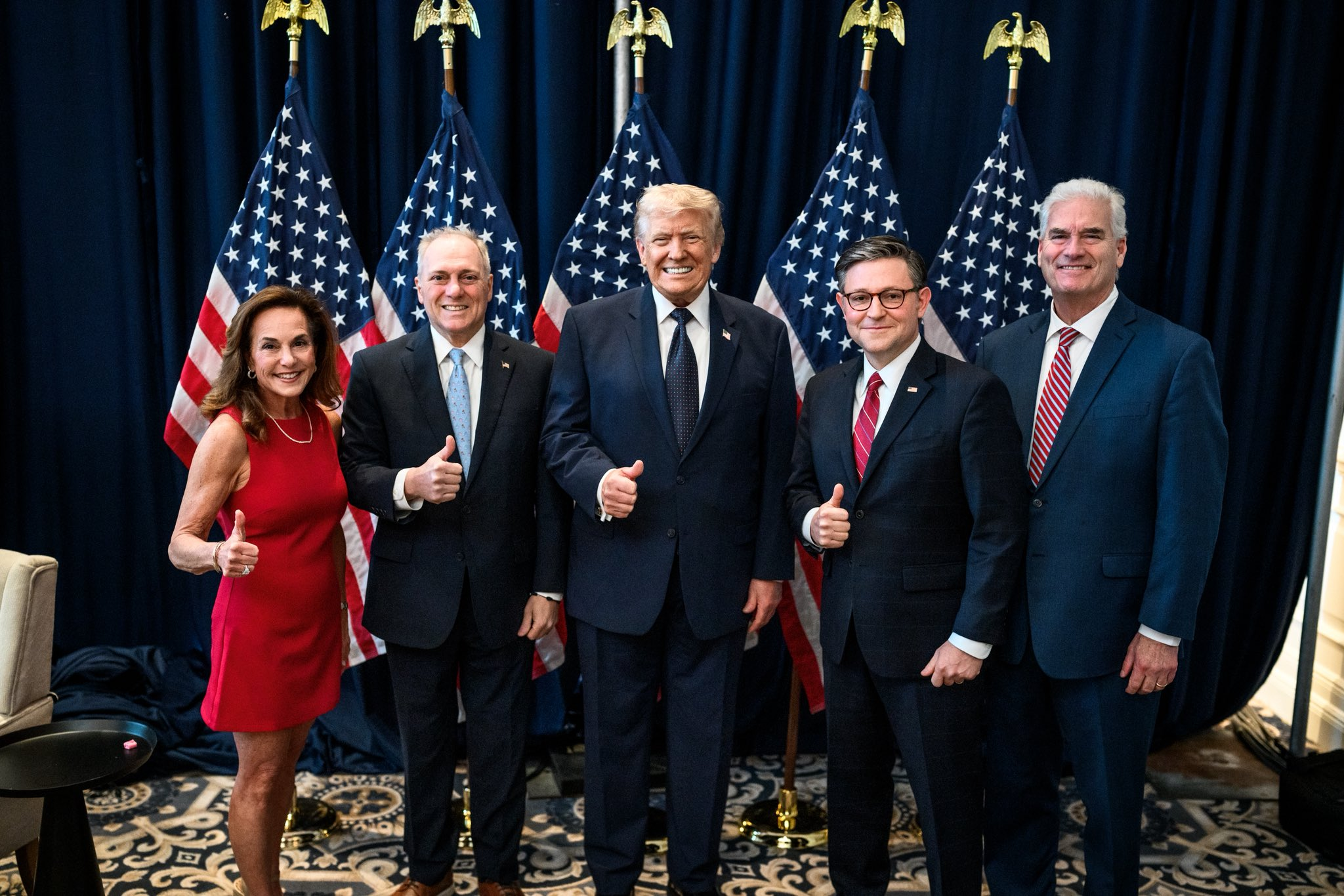
McClain with President Donald Trump and Republican House Leadership on March 9, 2026

At a 2022 Trump rally, McClain falsely claimed that Trump had "caught Osama bin Laden".

In 2025, McClain was critical of a sermon delivered by Episcopal bishop Mariann Budde during which Budde, speaking to an audience that included Donald Trump, said "In the name of our God, I ask you to have mercy upon the people in our country who are scared now." McClain called the sermon "extremely out of line".

=== Immigration ===
After U.S. citizen and Minneapolis resident Renée Good was killed by ICE, McClain blamed Democrats for the killing, offering prayers in support of the ICE agents.

=== Reaction to Canadian Wildfires ===
In July 2026, Lisa McClain jointly penned a letter to Prime Minister Mark Carney demanding immediate action from the Canadian government regarding wildfire smoke originating from wildfires burning nearby in Canada. This letter included the passage "Sovereignty comes with responsibility, and the responsibility to prevent a foreseeable disaster from crossing into another country's airspace has not been met". This has been perceived as mimicking threats made by U.S. President Donald Trump to make Canada the "51st state".

== Personal life ==
McClain and her husband, Michael, have four children and live in Romeo, an outer northern suburb of Detroit. She is a Roman Catholic.

== See also ==
- Women in the United States House of Representatives

U.S. House of Representatives
Preceded by Paul Mitchell	Member of the U.S. House of Representatives from Michigan's 10th congressional district 2021–2023	Succeeded by John James
Preceded by Andy Levin	Member of the U.S. House of Representatives from Michigan's 9th congressional district 2023–present	Incumbent
Party political offices
Preceded by Richard Hudson	Secretary of the House Republican Conference; 2023–2025	Succeeded by Erin Houchin
Preceded by Elise Stefanik	Chair of the House Republican Conference; 2025–present	Incumbent
U.S. order of precedence (ceremonial)
Preceded by Tracey Mann	United States representatives by seniority 263rd	Succeeded by Mary Miller
