= Natoma =

Natoma may refer to:

- Natoma (opera), a 1911 opera with music by Victor Herbert and libretto by Joseph D. Redding
- USC&GS Natoma, a private motorboat briefly serving as USS Natoma (SP-666) in the United States Navy, 1917–1919
- USS Natoma Bay (CVE-62), an escort carrier in the United States Navy, 1943–1946
- Intel 440FX, a computer chipset

== Places ==
- Natoma, Kansas, United States

=== California ===
- Lake Natoma
- Natoma, a populated place now part of Folsom, California that served as headquarters of the Natoma Company
- Natomas, Sacramento, California
- Natomas High School
- Natomas Unified School District
- Natomas Men's Professional Tennis Tournament
