= Leroy F. Greene =

American politician (1918–2002)

Member of the California Senate from the 6th district
- In office December 6, 1982 – November 30, 1998
- Preceded by: John Foran
- Succeeded by: Deborah Ortiz

Member of the California State Assembly
- In office January 7, 1963 – November 30, 1982
- Preceded by: Lloyd W. Lowrey
- Succeeded by: Lloyd Connelly
- Constituency: 3rd district (1963-1974); 6th district (1974-1982)

Personal details
- Born: January 31, 1918 Newark, New Jersey
- Died: September 23, 2002 (aged 84) Carmichael, California
- Party: Democratic
- Spouse(s): Denny Miller (1941-1991), Syma Reynolds (1995-2002)
- Children: Denny Lee
- Education: Purdue University
- Profession: Engineer

Military service
- Branch/service: United States Army
- Battles/wars: World War II

Leroy F. Greene (January 31, 1918 – September 29, 2002) was a Democratic politician in California. He represented Sacramento County in the State Assembly from 1962 until 1982 and was a California state senator from 1982 to 1998. His thirty-six years of service between the two houses made him the seventh-longest-serving member in the history of the California State Legislature.

== Legislative career ==
Greene sponsored many bills and measures in education during his 36-year legislative career, such as the Leroy F. Greene School Facilities Act of 1998, which requires the State Allocation Board to certify funding for modernization and construction of school facilities. Other bills introduced by Greene related to consumer foodstuffs, earthquake-proof building codes and the legalization of Bingo in California. Greene also introduced a bill requiring newborns to be tested for PKU, a brain-destroying disorder that can be controlled. Leroy F. Greene Middle School and Leroy Greene Academy in the Natomas district of Sacramento were named after Greene following his departure from the legislature. Upon his departure, he also became an education consultant and served on the California Medical Assistance Commission.

In 1972, Greene introduced a bill to legalize prostitution. He did this after reading a newspaper headline about "Tarts Run Out of Sacramento," which led him to survey his constituents in a newsletter. The survey generated a higher response rate than any other issue he'd raised, with 69% of respondents in favor.

== Private life ==
Greene married Denny Miller in 1941, who died in 1991. They had a daughter named Dennie. In 1995, Greene married educational lobbyist Syma Reynolds. They remained married until Greene died in 2002. Syma Reynolds died in December 2012.
