= Natomas High School =

Location
- 3301 Fong Ranch Rd; Sacramento, California 95834; United States; 38.62912°N 121.49507°W

Information
- School type: Public, High School
- Established: 1997
- School district: Natomas Unified School District
- Principal: Marcel Baker
- Teaching staff: 52.48 (FTE)
- Grades: 9–12
- Gender: Co-Ed
- Average class size: 35
- Student to teacher ratio: 22.05
- Campus size: 500 acres
- Color
- Slogan: "It's a Great Day to be a Nighthawk!...CAW!"
- Team name: Nighthawks
- Rival: Inderkum High School
- STAR average: 701
- Graduates: 87%
- Website: nhs.natomasunified.org

Natomas High School is a high school in the Natomas Unified School District located in the Natomas neighborhood of Sacramento. It is located at 3301 Fong Ranch Road. The school mascot is Nelly the Nighthawk.

== History ==
Opened in 1997, the school is the first high school built in the Natomas Unified School District. A total of 1,300 students started attending the school that year, although it was built to accommodate 1,800 and has a total capacity of 2,200. For the previous three years, high school students in the district attended classes on the campus of Leroy Greene Middle School.

In 1998, the school started a Business and Professions Academy. By 2001, eighty students in the program would regularly come to school in dresses, suits and ties or other clothing considered "business appropriate".

== Notable alumni ==
- Daniel Cuevas – winger for Lobos de la BUAP in Ascenso MX and United States men's national under-20 soccer team
- Robert Rothbart – center for Hapoel Galil Elyon in the Israeli basketball league
- Teal Wicks – actress. Performed on Broadway as Elphaba in Wicked.

== 2026 shooting ==
On April 10, 2026, the school was placed on lock down. A shooter was reported on campus at 3:30 pm, and one student, identified as De'Jon Sledge, from a nearby school and a former student at the school was shot and was pronounced dead at the scene.The suspect who was presumed to be a Natomas High student was arrested, however the Sacramento DA didn't continue with charges, and instead wrote the possible homicide off as a self-defense act. At the scene, the victim was wearing a ski mask and had a firearm. The Sacramento DA concluded that rather than a targeted homicide, the prepetrator acted in self-defense against the victim. It is unclear why the perpetrator was armed.

== Sports ==
- 2008 Varsity Boys championship Soccer Team

Natomas Nighthawks (14-6-4), played Bella Vista (13-6-3) 2–1 in pouring rain to win the Sac-Joaquin Section Division III championship at Folsom High School. It was Nighthawks' first boys section soccer championship and the first time Coach Joe Rebelo's team advanced past the first round of the playoffs in his eight years at the school.

- 2020 Varsity Boys CIF NorCal Championship

On March 7, 2020, The Natomas Nighthawks (19-6-3) beat John F. Kennedy High school of Richmond, CA (15-10-3) 3–2 to claim its first-ever CIF NorCal Division IV Soccer Championship.

- 2020/21 Varsity GSL League Champions

On 4/16/21, the Natomas Nighthawks beat Florin High School to end with a league record of 4-0, and a 4-2 record overall, and claimed the title of the champions of the Greater Sacramento League for the first time in school history. Powered by Coach Hagan.

== External links/sources ==
- Official site
