= California's 6th district =

California's 6th district may refer to:

- California's 6th congressional district
- California's 6th State Assembly district
- California's 6th State Senate district
