= Two Rivers Elementary School =

Two Rivers Elementary School may refer to:

- Two Rivers Elementary School - Two Rivers School District (Arkansas)
- Two Rivers Elementary School - Natomas Unified School District (California)
