= Joseph Nation =

American academic and politician

Member of the California State Assembly from the 6th district
- In office December 4, 2000 – November 30, 2006
- Preceded by: Kerry Mazzoni
- Succeeded by: Jared Huffman

Personal details
- Born: Joseph Edward Nation; July 18, 1956 (age 70) Richardson, Texas, U.S.
- Party: Democratic
- Spouse(s): Gizelda Nation; Linda Nicolay (Divorce)
- Children: 3
- Education: University of Colorado Boulder; Georgetown University School of Foreign Service; RAND Graduate School; Stanford University

Joseph Edward Nation (born July 18, 1956) is an American academic and former politician. He graduated from the University of Colorado with a B.A. in Economics, German and French. While he was a Pan Am flight attendant, he studied at Georgetown University under Madeleine Albright as a James T. Webb Fellow in Science, Technology, and Diplomacy while earning a Masters in Foreign Service. He subsequently earned a Ph.D. in Public Policy Analysis from the RAND Graduate School and completed a post-doctoral fellowship at Stanford University, where he conducted research on defense conversion and wrote a book, The De-Escalation of Nuclear Crises.

He represented Marin and southern Sonoma counties in the California State Assembly, for three consecutive terms, as a Democrat from 2000 until he was termed out in 2006. When Nation was elected in 2000, his primary opponents were university official Carole Hayashino, future gubernatorial recall candidate Paul Nave, and future Marin County Supervisor Susan Adams. He defeated the Republican candidate, Edward Sullivan, in the general election. According to a study published by the Leadership Institute for Conservative Leaders Who Want to Win, Nation's campaign received contributions totaling $10,372 from the MICRA Political Action Committee of NorCal Mutual Insurance Company in 2003-2004. Out of 18 candidates (16 Republicans and 2 Democrats) Nation received the highest total from MICRA NorCal, an average of 70% more in donations than most other recipients, including $749 more than the next highest recipient. In 2004 Nation was chosen to be Chair of the Assembly Rules Committee, and he was asked to create and direct the Office of Policy Planning and Research.

In 2005, with his term-out looming, Nation challenged 6th Congressional District representative Lynn Woolsey in the primary, and lost. In 2008, he entered the primary for the 3rd Senate District seat, and lost.

He teaches climate change policy, health care policy, and public policy at Stanford University. Nation is a former professor of economics at the University of San Francisco and the Monterey Institute of International Studies, where he taught economics, public policy, public finance, and foreign policy. He continues to consult for RAND and is a partner in a consulting firm that focuses on renewable energy and climate change. Nation has briefed members of the British Parliament and European Union, and is a frequent invited speaker at conferences on climate change and carbon management.

== Personal data ==
Nation resides in Northern California with his wife, Gizelda and stepdaughter, Mariana. He has adult twin daughters, Alexandera and Kristen, from a previous marriage with Linda Nicolay.

== Career ==
- Principal co-author of AB 32, California's Global Warming Solutions Act.
- Represented California at the 2006 United Nations' summit on climate change in Nairobi.
- Authored nearly 50 successful bills, including greenhouse gas labeling for autos, fuel efficiency standards for tires, and tax incentives for alternative energy.
- Teaches health care, climate change, and politics courses at Stanford University.
- Regular contributor on climate change for the San Francisco Chronicle.
- Three-term California State Assemblyman, representing Marin and Sonoma counties.
- Member of the California Market Advisory Committee (focusing on offsets and linkages with other markets).
- As a three-term assemblyman, Nation authored legislation that created a two-county district for the purposes of developing a commuter rail system, the Sonoma–Marin Area Rail Transit.

== Education ==
- BA, Economics, German, French, University of Colorado
- MSFS, Georgetown University School of Foreign Service
- PhD, Public Policy Analysis, The RAND Graduate School
- Post-doctoral fellow, Stanford University

California Assembly
Preceded by Kerry Mazzoni	California State Assemblyman, 6th District; December 4, 2000– November 30, 2006	Succeeded by Jared Huffman
