= Ingels =

Ingels is a surname. Notable people with the surname include:

- Art Ingels (1918–1981), American racing driver
- Bjarke Ingels (born 1974), Danish architect, founder and creative partner of Bjarke Ingels Group
- Graham Ingels (1915–1991), American comic book and magazine illustrator
- Margaret Ingels (1892–1971), American engineer
- Marty Ingels, born Martin Ingerman (1936–2015), American actor, comedian, comedy sketch writer and theatrical agent
- Nick Ingels (born 1984), Belgian road bicycle racer
- Ove Ingels (1926–1977), Swedish curler
- R. R. Ingels (1890–1958), American politician
- Veerle Ingels (born 1981), Belgian racing cyclist

== See also ==
- Bjarke Ingels Group, Architecture firm of Denmark
