= Jared Huffman =

American lawyer & politician (born 1964)

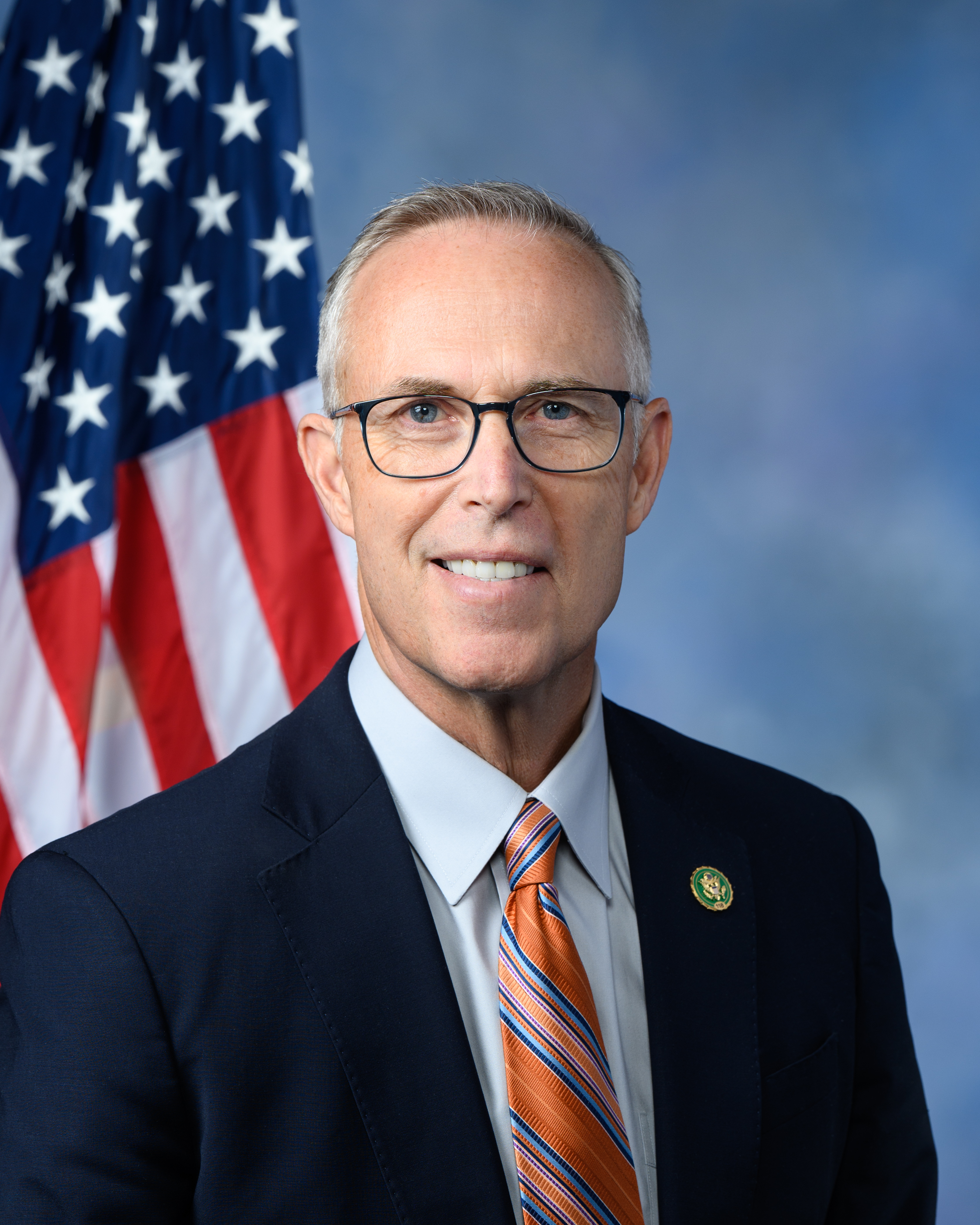
- Official portrait, 2023

Ranking Member of the House Natural Resources Committee
- Incumbent
- Assumed office January 3, 2025
- Preceded by: Raúl Grijalva

Member of the U.S. House of Representatives from California's 2nd district
- Incumbent
- Assumed office January 3, 2013
- Preceded by: Lynn Woolsey

Member of the California State Assembly from the 6th district
- In office December 4, 2006 – November 30, 2012
- Preceded by: Joe Nation
- Succeeded by: Beth Gaines

Personal details
- Born: Jared William Huffman; February 18, 1964 (age 62) Independence, Missouri, U.S.
- Party: Democratic
- Spouse: Susan Huffman
- Children: 2
- Education: University of California, Santa Barbara (BA); Boston College (JD)
- Website: House website Campaign website
- Huffman's voice Huffman supporting the America COMPETES Act; Recorded February 2, 2022

Jared William Huffman (born February 18, 1964) is an American lawyer and politician serving as the U.S. representative for California's 2nd congressional district since 2013. A member of the Democratic Party, Huffman represented the 6th district in the California State Assembly from 2006 to 2012. He chaired the Assembly Water, Parks & Wildlife Committee and the Assembly Environmental Caucus. He was elected to Congress in 2012 with more than 70% of the vote, defeating Republican nominee Dan Roberts. His congressional district covers the North Coast from the Golden Gate Bridge to the Oregon border.

== Early life and education ==
Huffman was born in Independence, Missouri. His family were members of the Reorganized Church of Jesus Christ of Latter Day Saints He graduated from William Chrisman High School in 1982 and in 1986 received his Bachelor of Arts in political science magna cum laude from University of California, Santa Barbara, where he was a member of the Phi Delta Theta fraternity. At UCSB, Huffman was a three-time All-American volleyball player. He was a member of the USA Volleyball Team in 1987 when the team was top-ranked worldwide and had recently won the World Championship. He graduated cum laude from Boston College Law School in 1990, and then moved to the San Francisco Bay Area.

== Legal career ==
Huffman worked as a consumer attorney specializing in public interest cases. Among his court victories was a case on behalf of the National Organization for Women, which required all California State University campuses to comply with Title IX. Huffman was a senior attorney for the Natural Resources Defense Council. In 1994, he was elected to the Marin Municipal Water District. He served on the board for 12 years, including three terms as its president.

== California State Assembly ==
=== Elections ===
Huffman won the Democratic nomination for the 6th district, an open seat after incumbent Joe Nation was termed out, in a hotly contested June 2006 primary in which he surprised the political establishment with a victory over Pamela Torliatt, a Petaluma city councilwoman, and Cynthia Murray, a Marin County Supervisor who was initially considered the front-runner. Huffman also defeated Assistant State Attorney General Damon Connolly, Marin County Democratic chairman John Alden, and sociologist Alex Easton-Brown.

Huffman defeated Republican nominee Michael Hartnett by a more than 2:1 margin in the 2006 general election.

Huffman faced two opponents in the 2008 general election: Republican Paul Lavery and Libertarian Timothy Hannan. He won 70% of the vote, and the 137,873 votes he received were among the most by any California Assembly candidate in 2008. In the Democratic primary, Huffman was unopposed and received 57,213 votes—the most of any California Assembly member in that election.

In the June 2010 California primary, Huffman defeated Patrick Connally. He defeated Republican nominee Robert Stephens in the general election with more than 70% of the vote—the highest winning margin of any candidate on the ballot in the North Bay that year. Due to term limits, Huffman could not seek a fourth Assembly term in 2012.

=== Tenure ===
In his first four years as a legislator, Huffman authored and passed more than 40 pieces of legislation. In 2008, he sponsored a bill (AB 2950), which he wrote with internet attorney Daniel Balsam, that aimed to close what its proponents characterized as loopholes in the CAN-SPAM Act that made it more difficult to bring lawsuits against deceptive spammers. The bill passed the State Assembly and Senate, but Governor Arnold Schwarzenegger vetoed it.

In 2009, Huffman authored a bill (AB 1437) to require all shelled eggs sold in California to comply with Proposition 2's requirement that egg-laying hens be raised with enough space to fully extend their limbs and turn around. The law was signed by Governor Schwarzenegger in 2010 and took effect on January 1, 2015. It was later codified and expanded by 2018 California Proposition 12, which prohibited the sale of products from animals raised in battery cages, gestation crates, and veal crates.

On February 14, 2011, Huffman co-sponsored a bill with Paul Fong, California Assembly Bill 376, to make it illegal to possess, distribute, or sell shark fins, except for research or commercial purposes.

=== Committee assignments ===
Upon his swearing-in on December 4, 2006, Assembly speaker Fabian Núñez named Huffman chair of the Committee on Environmental Safety and Toxic Materials. In August 2008, the new Assembly speaker, Karen Bass, named Huffman to chair the Water, Parks & Wildlife Committee.

== U.S. House of Representatives ==
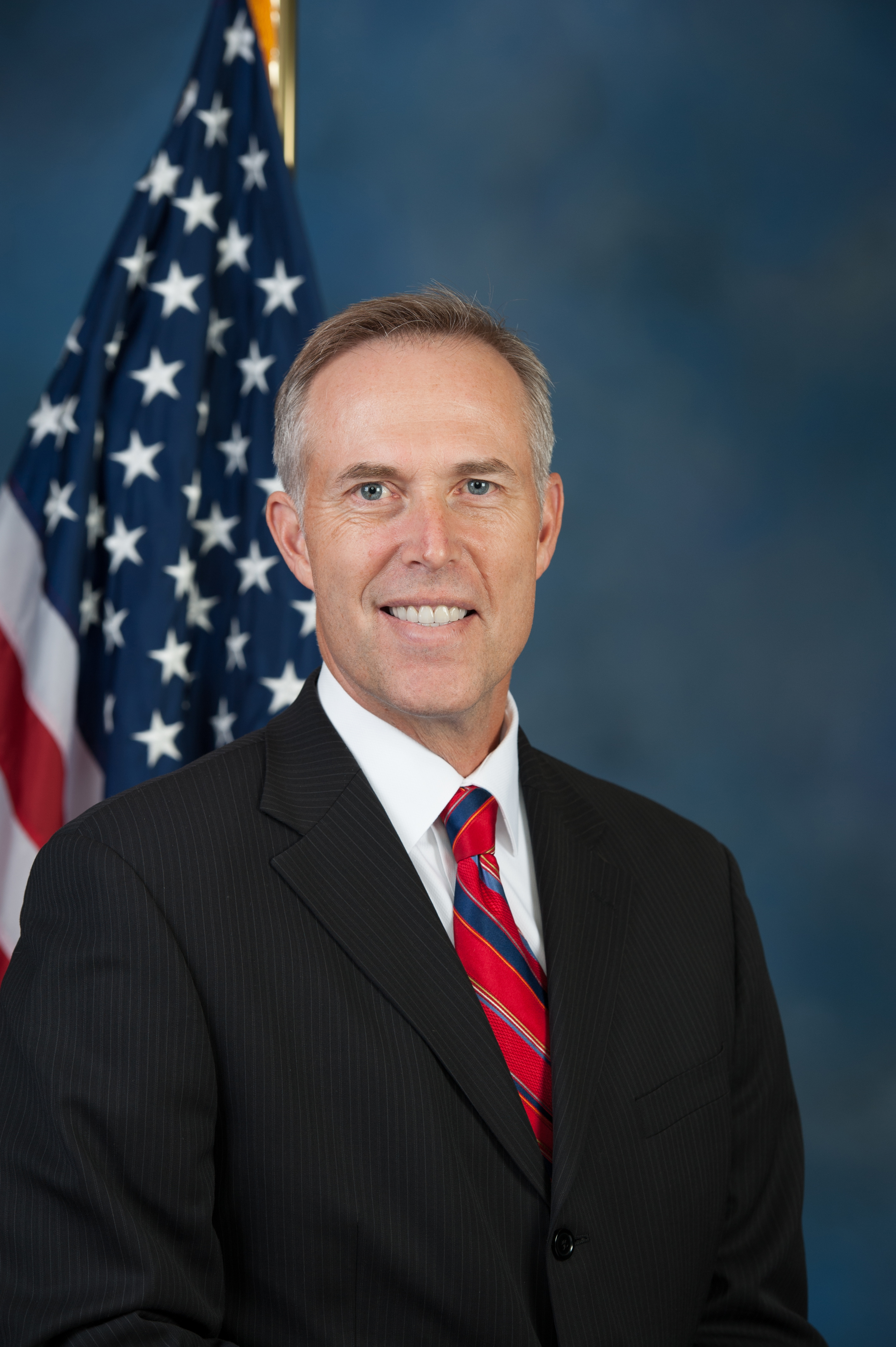
Huffman during the 113th United States Congress

=== Elections ===
==== 2012 ====
After 20-year incumbent Lynn Woolsey announced her retirement, Huffman entered the race to run for her seat in the 2nd district, which had been renumbered from the 6th in redistricting. California's 2nd congressional district now covers six counties: Marin, Sonoma, Mendocino, Trinity, Humboldt, and Del Norte.

Huffman finished first in the top-two primary, with 37% of the vote. In November, he defeated Republican candidate Dan Roberts 71%–29%.

==== 2014 ====
In his first reelection campaign, Huffman dominated the open primary, receiving 67.9% of the vote against 22.3% for second-place finisher Dale Mensing, a Republican. He defeated Mensing in the general election, 75% to 25%.

==== 2016 ====
Huffman defeated Mensing again, receiving 68.3% of the primary vote to Mensing's 15.7% and 76.5% of the general election vote to Mensing's 23.5%.

==== 2018 ====
Huffman defeated Mensing a third time, with 72.5% of the primary vote to Mensing's 20.9% and 77.0% of the vote in the general election.

==== 2020 ====
Huffman defeated Mensing a fourth time, with 67.7% of the primary vote to Mensing's 18.9% and 75.7% of the general election vote.

==== 2022 ====
Huffman defeated former Ferndale city councilmember Douglas Brower, with 68.7% of the primary vote to Brower's 8.6% and 74.4% of the general election vote.

==== 2024 ====
Huffman defeated Chris Coulombe, with 73.4% of the primary vote to Coulombe's 16.4% and 71.9% of the general election vote.

==== 2026 ====
Huffman defeated Republican Robin Littau in the general election, after Proposition 50 was approved by voters, allowing Democrats to redraw district boundaries before the census. Huffman won 56.48% of the primary vote, and now represents portions of northeastern California that he had never previously visited.

=== Tenure ===
In April 2018, Huffman, Jerry McNerney, Jamie Raskin, and Dan Kildee launched the Congressional Freethought Caucus. Its stated goals include "pushing public policy formed on the basis of reason, science, and moral values"; promoting the "separation of church and state"; and opposing discrimination against "atheists, agnostics, humanists, seekers, religious and non-religious persons", among others. Huffman and Raskin are co-chairs. Huffman was named Humanist of the Year by the American Humanist Association in 2020. Huffman and Raskin both received the Religious Liberty Award from the American Humanist Association in 2024.

In the aftermath of the United States Conference of Catholic Bishops's vote to draft a document regarding Catholic politicians' worthiness to receive Communion, Huffman accused the Church of "weaponizing" its religion, and suggested that it should lose its tax-exempt status.

Huffman voted with President Joe Biden's stated position 100% of the time in the 117th Congress, according to a FiveThirtyEight analysis.

On July 19, 2024, Huffman called for Joe Biden to withdraw from the 2024 United States presidential election.

=== Committee assignments ===
For the 119th Congress:

- Committee on Natural Resources
  - Subcommittee on Energy and Mineral Resources
- Committee on Transportation and Infrastructure
  - Subcommittee on Highways and Transit
  - Subcommittee on Water Resources and Environment

=== Caucus memberships ===
- Congressional Arts Caucus
- Congressional Equality Caucus
- Congressional Freethought Caucus (Co-Chair)
- Congressional Progressive Caucus
- Medicare for All Caucus
- Congressional Coalition on Adoption
- Rare Disease Caucus

== Political positions ==
=== Abortion ===
Huffman opposed the overturning of Roe v. Wade, calling it "sad, outrageous" and saying, "it's going to be tragic for millions of women in this country." He described the U.S. Supreme Court as "extreme, out of touch" and "right-wing".

=== House legislation ===
==== H.R. 2824 ====
Preventing Government Waste and Protecting Coal Mining Jobs in America (H.R. 2824) was introduced in 2013 as a bill that would "amend the Surface Mining Control and Reclamation Act of 1977 to require state programs for regulation of surface coal mining to incorporate the necessary rule concerning excess spoil, coal mine waste, and buffers for perennial and intermittent streams published by the Office of Surface Mining Reclamation and Enforcement on December 12, 2008." Huffman opposed the bill, arguing that it should be opposed because the supporters "believe coal companies should be allowed to blow the tops off mountains and dump the waste into streams, no matter what the science says about the consequence for our environment and the public health."

==== H.R. 3189 ====
The Water Rights Protection Act (H.R. 3189) was introduced in 2013 as a bill that would prevent federal agencies from requiring certain entities to relinquish their water rights to the United States to use public lands. The bill was a reaction to the United States Forest Service's decision to pursue a "new regulation to demand that water rights be transferred to the federal government as a condition for obtaining permits needed to operate 121 ski resorts that cross over federal lands." Huffman opposed the bill and accused the House Natural Resources Subcommittee on Water and Power of being unnecessarily "adversarial" and having "unfairly vilified" the Forest Service after a committee hearing about the bill.

==== Fiscal Responsibility Act of 2023 ====
Huffman was among the 46 Democrats who voted against final passage of the Fiscal Responsibility Act of 2023 (H.R. 3746) in the House.

==== H.Res. 798 ====
On November 2, 2023, four weeks after the October 7 attacks, Huffman was one of 22 House Representatives who voted against H.Res. 798, "Condemning the support of Hamas, Hezbollah, and other terrorist organizations at institutions of higher education, which may lead to the creation of a hostile environment for Jewish students, faculty, and staff." The resolution passed with the bipartisan support of 213 Republicans and 183 Democrats. After receiving criticism from Jewish American groups and other constituents, several days later Huffman disavowed his vote and issued a public apology.

=== The Stop Project 2025 Task Force ===
On June 11, 2024, Huffman unveiled The Stop Project 2025 Task Force, led by a group of House Democrats, to combat the right-wing Project 2025 policy proposals for a radically reshaped U.S. federal government should a Republican president be elected in the 2024 U.S. presidential election Project 2025 was authored by the Heritage Foundation, a conservative think tank.

Huffman warned that the Project 2025 agenda would hit "like a blitzkrieg" (a "lightning war") and that lawmakers would need to be prepared to tackle it well in advance. "If we're trying to react to it and understand it in real time, it's too late," he stated. He described Project 2025 as "a wrecking ball against everything that most of us hold dear about our country and our democracy," adding "that's the biggest challenge we face ... How do you explain that this really is what they're going to do without overwhelming people?"

== Personal life ==
Huffman speaking about Christian nationalism and humanism in 2026.

Huffman lives in San Rafael with his wife, Susan, and their two children. His hobby is winemaking.

In a 2017 interview with The Washington Post's Michelle Boorstein, Huffman identified as a humanist and said "I suppose you could say I don't believe in God." Previously in his career, he had declined to discuss his religious beliefs or apply any label when asked. Huffman is the only elected member of the U.S. House who openly describes himself as religiously unaffiliated and a secular humanist. Huffman is also the only member of Congress who openly rejects the existence of God. He has also stated that he does not believe in life after death.

== Electoral history ==
Electoral history of Jared Huffman
Year	Office		Party	Primary			General			Result	Swing	Ref.
Year	Office		Party	Total	%	P.	Total	%	P.	Result	Swing	Ref.
2006	State Assembly	6th	Democratic	22,544	32.47	1st	106,589	65.84	1st	Won	Hold	
2008	State Assembly	6th	Democratic	57,213	100.0	1st	145,142	69.45	1st	Won	Hold	
2010	State Assembly	6th	Democratic	53,534	81.77	1st	119,753	70.45	1st	Won	Hold	
2012	U.S. House	2nd	Democratic	63,922	37.47	1st	226,216	71.24	1st	Won	Hold	
2014	U.S. House	2nd	Democratic	99,186	67.91	1st	163,124	74.99	1st	Won	Hold	
2016	U.S. House	2nd	Democratic	157,897	68.30	1st	254,194	76.85	1st	Won	Hold	
2018	U.S. House	2nd	Democratic	144,005	72.48	1st	243,081	77.01	1st	Won	Hold	
2020	U.S. House	2nd	Democratic	184,155	67.69	1st	294,435	75.74	1st	Won	Hold	
2022	U.S. House	2nd	Democratic	145,245	68.73	1st	229,720	74.40	1st	Won	Hold	
2024	U.S. House	2nd	Democratic	170,271	73.45	1st	272,883	71.88	1st	Won	Hold	
2026	U.S. House	2nd	Democratic	139,662	56.48	1st	TBD					
Source: Secretary of State of California | Statewide Election Results

U.S. House of Representatives
Preceded by Wally Herger	Member of the U.S. House of Representatives from California's 2nd congressional district 2013–present	Incumbent
Preceded by Raúl Grijalva	Ranking Member of the House Natural Resources Committee; 2025–present	Incumbent
U.S. order of precedence (ceremonial)
Preceded by Richard Hudson	United States representatives by seniority 105th	Succeeded by Hakeem Jeffries
