= Eric Pinkins =

American football player (born 1991)

No. 47, 37
- Position: Linebacker / Safety

Personal information
- Born: August 7, 1991 (age 35); Sacramento, California, U.S.
- Listed height: 6 ft 3 in (1.91 m)
- Listed weight: 220 lb (100 kg)

Career information
- High school: Inderkum (Sacramento)
- College: San Diego State
- NFL draft: 2014: 6th round, 208th overall pick

Career history
- Seattle Seahawks (2014–2015); New York Giants (2016); Dallas Cowboys (2018)*; San Diego Fleet (2019); Los Angeles Wildcats (2020)*; Team 9 (2020)*
- * Offseason or practice squad member only

Career NFL statistics
- Total tackles: 3
- Stats at Pro Football Reference

Eric Pinkins (born August 7, 1991) is an American former professional football player who was a linebacker and safety in the National Football League (NFL). He played college football for the San Diego State Aztecs and was selected by the Seattle Seahawks in the sixth round of the 2014 NFL draft.

== Early life ==
Pinkins attended Inderkum High School in Sacramento, California. He was selected to the 2008 all-Metro football defense second-team in high school. Pinkins was named as an all-San Joaquin honorable mention by the National Football Foundation. He recorded 52 tackles, three interceptions, nine pass deflections, four blocked punts, and a fumble recovery in his Junior season of high school. He registered 63 tackles, two interceptions, and 12 pass deflections in his senior season of high school. He was a member of his high school track and field team.

College recruiting
Name	Hometown	School	Height	Weight	40^{‡}	Commit date
Eric Pinkins; Safety	Sacramento, California	Inderkum High School	6 ft 3 in (1.91 m)	185 lb (84 kg)	4.57	Feb 2, 2009
Eric Pinkins; Safety	Recruit ratings: Scout: Rivals:					
Overall recruit ranking: Scout: 132 (Safety) Rivals: -- National, 57 (Safety), 92 (Cal)
‡ Refers to 40-yard dash; Note: In many cases, Scout, Rivals, 247Sports, On3, and ESPN may conflict in their listings of height, weight and 40 time.; In these cases, the average was taken. ESPN grades are on a 100-point scale.; Sources: "San Diego State Football Commitments". Rivals.; "2009 San Diego State Football Recruiting Commits". Scout.; "Scout.com Team Recruiting Rankings". Scout.; "2009 Team Ranking". Rivals.com.

== College career ==
He finished his college football career with a total of 172 tackles, three sacks, two forced fumbles, and 10 pass deflections.

== Professional career ==
=== Seattle Seahawks ===
On May 10, 2014, Pinkins was selected by the Seattle Seahawks in the sixth round of the 2014 NFL draft with the 208th overall pick. On September 5, 2015, he was waived. On September 6, 2015, he was signed to the Seahawks' practice squad. On September 22, 2015, Pinkins was released from the practice squad. On October 14, 2015, he was signed to the practice squad. On November 21, 2015, he was promoted to the active roster. On September 3, 2016, he was waived/injured by the Seahawks and placed on injured reserve. On September 10, he was released from the Seahawks' injured reserve.

=== New York Giants ===
On October 12, 2016, Pinkins was signed to the New York Giants practice squad. On November 29, 2016, he was promoted to the active roster.

On September 1, 2017, Pinkins was waived by the Giants.

=== Dallas Cowboys ===
After spending the entire 2017 NFL season as a free agent, On May 29, 2018, Pinkins signed with Dallas Cowboys. He was released on September 1, 2018.

=== San Diego Fleet ===
In 2019, Pinkins joined the San Diego Fleet of the Alliance of American Football. He was one of seven San Diego State alumni to make the team's final 52-man roster. The league ceased operations in April 2019.

=== Los Angeles Wildcats ===
In October 2019, Pinkins was selected by the Los Angeles Wildcats in the 2020 XFL draft. He was waived during final roster cuts on January 22, 2020. He signed to the XFL's Team 9 practice squad during the regular season. He had his contract terminated when the league suspended operations on April 10, 2020.
