= Lloyd Connelly =

American politician and judge from California

Member of the California State Assembly from the 6th district
- In office December 6, 1982 – November 30, 1992
- Preceded by: Leroy F. Greene
- Succeeded by: Vivien Bronshvag

Personal details
- Born: December 31, 1945 (age 80) Sacramento, California, U.S.
- Party: Democratic
- Spouse: Jeanne Shaw (after 1987)
- Children: 3
- Education: American River College; California State University, Sacramento; McGeorge School of Law

Military service
- Branch/service: United States Army
- Years of service: 1968-1970

Lloyd George Connelly, Jr. (born December 31, 1945, in Sacramento, California) is a Sacramento County, California Superior Court Judge.

Before his appointment as a judge, Connelly was a Democratic politician, serving as a member of the California State Assembly from 1982 until 1992. Prior to being elected to the State Assembly, he served as a member of the Sacramento City Council.

Connelly attended American River College and then received his undergraduate degree from California State University, Sacramento and his law degree from University of the Pacific's McGeorge School of Law.

California Assembly
Preceded by Leroy F. Greene	California State Assemblyman, 6th District; 1982-1992	Succeeded by Vivien Bronshvag
