= Kerry Mazzoni =

American politician

Member of the California State Assembly from the 6th district
- In office December 5, 1994 – November 30, 2000
- Preceded by: Vivien Bronshvag
- Succeeded by: Joseph Nation

Personal details
- Born: January 9, 1949 (age 77) Springfield, Ohio, U.S.
- Party: Democratic
- Spouse: Michael (m. 1970)
- Children: 2
- Education: University of California, Davis

Kerry Lynn Mazzoni (born January 9, 1949) is a former California State Assemblywoman who represented the 6th District, consisting of Marin County and part of Sonoma County, from 1994 to 2000.

Mazzoni was a member of the Novato School Board. She defeated incumbent Vivien Bronshvag in the 1994 primary. She defeated Petaluma City Councilman Brian Sobel in the general election. Mazzoni was term limited out of office in 2000.

She later served as State Education Secretary in the administration of Governor Gray Davis. Mazzoni served as secretary until Davis was recalled in 2003. Mazzoni subsequently worked as a lobbyist and campaign consultant.

On March 8, 2010, the Marin Independent Journal reported Mazzoni would run for the District One seat on the Marin County Board of Supervisors against incumbent Susan Adams, and was quoted as saying she wanted to "offer a different perspective" on Marin County political issues, including a controversial local energy authority alternative to service provided by Pacific Gas and Electric. Mazzoni lost in a close race.

Mazzoni is an alumna of the University of California, Davis.

California Assembly
Preceded by Vivien Bronshvag	California State Assemblywoman, 6th District; December 5, 1994–November 30, 2000	Succeeded by Joe Nation
