= Vivien Bronshvag =

American politician

Member of the California State Assembly from the 6th district
- In office December 7, 1992 – November 30, 1994
- Preceded by: Lloyd Connelly
- Succeeded by: Kerry Mazzoni

Personal details
- Born: July 28, 1942 (age 84) Chicago, Illinois, U.S.
- Party: Democratic
- Spouse(s): Dr. Michael M. Bronshvag, MD (m. 1966)
- Children: 3
- Education: University of Wisconsin–Madison

Vivien Bronshvag (born July 28, 1942) is an American politician from California and a member of the Democratic Party and has lived in Kentfield, California since 1975. She is Jewish.

An alumna of the University of Wisconsin–Madison, Bronshvag was an interior decorator before making her first run for the California State Assembly in 1990. She lost that race to then-incumbent Republican Bill Filante, who had represented the Marin-Sonoma based 9th district since 1979. When Filante left in 1992 to run for congress, Bronshvag ran again, this time in the renumbered 6th district.

She spent $250,000 of her own money and won the Democratic primary with 52% of the vote, more than 30 points ahead of her closest competitor. She went on to win the general election as well, beating then Marin County supervisor Al Aramburu by 15 points.

By 1994, however, Bronshvag had developed a less than flattering reputation in the state capitol. She acquired the nickname "the duchess" among staffers who felt she treated them like serfs. Then a speeding ticket cost her a suspended driver's license and prompted the nickname "the flying duchess".

Despite once again spending much of her own money, she lost the Democratic primary to then Novato school board member Kerry Mazzoni. In fact her baggage was such that she even lost her home county, Marin.

== Electoral history ==
Member, California State Assembly: 1993-95
Year	Office	Democrat	Votes	Pct	Republican	Votes	Pct
1990	California State Assembly; District 9	Vivien Bronshvag	52,659	42.5%	Bill Filante 51.3%	73,805	51.4%
1992	California State Assembly; District 6 (renumbered)	Gregory Brockbank 17% Vivien Bronshvag 52% Harry Moore 20%	100,812	53.3%	Al Aramburu 52% Duane Hughes 48%	74,739	39.5%
1994	California State Assembly; District 6	Vivien Bronshvag 49% Kerry Mazzoni 51%	92,675	61.2%	Brian Sobel	55,006	36.3%

California Assembly
Preceded by Bill Filante	California State Assemblywoman, 6th District; December 7, 1992–November 30, 1994	Succeeded by Kerry Mazzoni
