= Kevin Kiley (politician) =

American politician (born 1985)

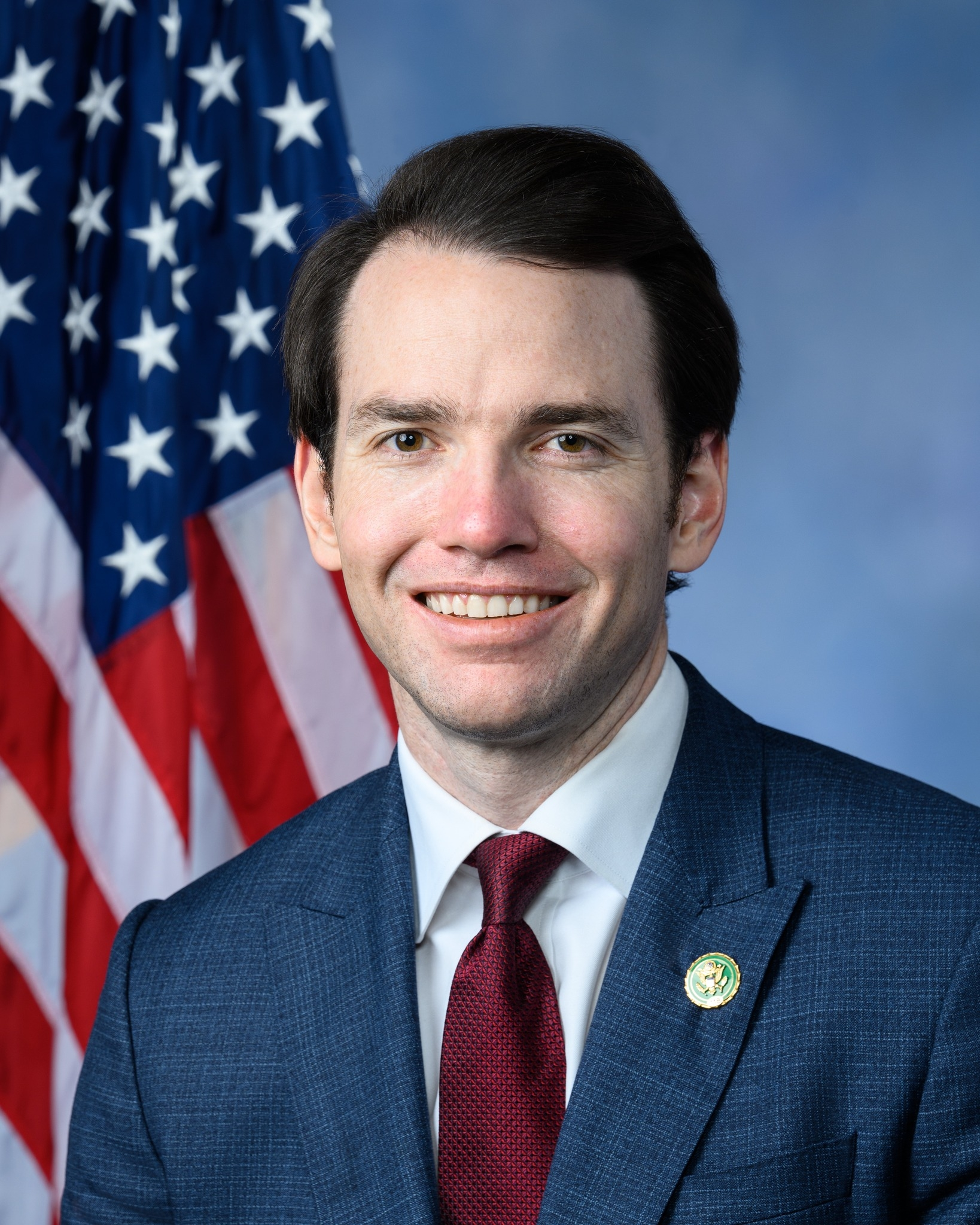
- Official portrait, 2023

Member of the U.S. House of Representatives from California's 3rd district
- Incumbent
- Assumed office January 3, 2023
- Preceded by: John Garamendi (redistricted)

Member of the California State Assembly from the 6th district
- In office December 5, 2016 – November 30, 2022
- Preceded by: Beth Gaines
- Succeeded by: Joe Patterson (redistricted)

Personal details
- Born: Kevin Patrick Kiley; January 30, 1985 (age 41) Rocklin, California, U.S.
- Party: Republican (before 2026); Independent (2026–present)
- Other political affiliations: House Republican Conference (2023–present)
- Spouse: Chelsee Gardner (m. 2023)
- Education: Harvard University (BA); Loyola Marymount University (MA); Yale University (JD)
- Website: House website Campaign website

Kevin Patrick Kiley (born January 30, 1985) is an American politician serving as the U.S. representative for California's 3rd congressional district since 2023. Previously, Kiley represented the 6th district in the California State Assembly from 2016 to 2022, and was an unsuccessful candidate to replace California governor Gavin Newsom in the 2021 California gubernatorial recall election.

Kiley was first elected to Congress in 2022 as a Republican. In 2026, Kiley announced he was leaving the party to become an independent, citing frustration with partisanship, and that he would run for re-election as an independent in California's 6th congressional district. He lost re-election to Democrat Richard Pan.

== Early life, education, and early career ==
Kiley grew up in the Sacramento area, where his father was a physician and his mother was a special education teacher. He graduated from Granite Bay High School.

Kiley graduated with an undergraduate degree from Harvard University in 2007. Upon graduation, he joined Teach for America, teaching for two years at Manual Arts High School while earning his teaching credentials at Loyola Marymount University in Los Angeles.

Kiley later graduated from Yale Law School, worked as an editor of the Yale Law Journal, and clerked at the Federal Reserve Bank of New York. He returned to California to join the law firm Irell & Manella, where he helped prepare an intellectual property theft case for T-Mobile against Chinese technology company Huawei that was the basis for a federal criminal investigation.

== California State Legislature (2016–2022) ==
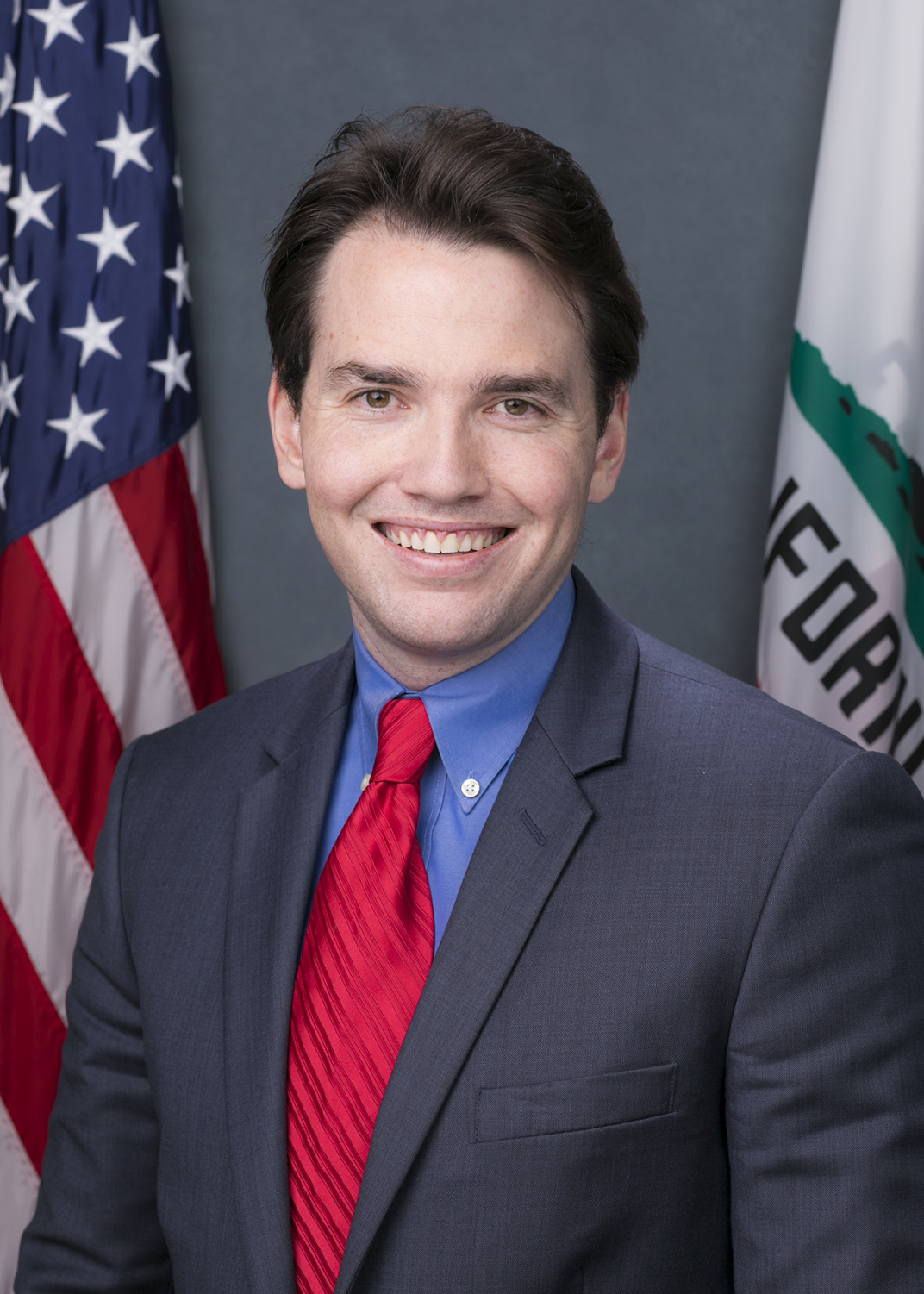
Kiley as a state assemblyman in 2021

In 2016, Kiley was elected to the California State Assembly. In May 2016, Kiley told The Sacramento Bee that he supported then-Ohio Governor John Kasich in the 2016 United States presidential election. In 2018, Kiley authored legislation to make it easier for students to transfer school districts.

After winning a second term in the State Assembly, Kiley ran for the State Senate in California's 1st District. He finished second in the primary, but lost the runoff to fellow Assemblyman Brian Dahle. Soon after the new legislative session began, Kiley introduced legislation to close, for private use, a controversial DMV office that catered exclusively to state legislators and staff. In a statement to The Sacramento Bee, Kiley said: "This is supposed to be a government of the people, by the people and for the people, not an oligarchy where a gilded political class enjoys privileges that aren't available to the people that we represent."

Kiley has said climate change is real, but opposed Governor Gavin Newsom's executive orders requiring all new vehicles sold in California to be zero emission by 2035 and banning oil-drilling by 2045. He is a supporter of charter schools. During a candidate interview in a 2021 California state race, Kiley declined to answer questions about the outcome of the 2020 presidential election. Kiley has said his position is to "stay out of national politics altogether", and that "national politics is a distraction that is used frankly by those in power in Sacramento [as] kind of a smokescreen for their own failures."

Though he voted to authorize $1 billion of emergency pandemic spending for Governor Newsom in March 2020, saying "to trust in Governor Newsom's leadership and listen to his guidance", Kiley later said Newsom "made a mockery of that trust" and, alongside fellow California legislator James Gallagher, sued in June 2020 to remove Newsom's emergency powers. Kiley lost the case on appeal.

In his final term in the State Assembly, Kiley introduced legislation to ban local and state governments from implementing vaccine mandates.

=== United States Senate vacancies ===
In 2020, Kiley urged passage of his bill that would require the potential successor of then-candidate for vice president and Senator Kamala Harris to be elected by California's voters and not appointed by the governor; he reiterated that view during the 2021 gubernatorial recall campaign by pledging to allow voters to pick a replacement for Senator Dianne Feinstein if he became governor and her seat became vacant. Kiley later flagged a constitutional issue with Newsom's appointment of Alex Padilla to replace Harris and Padilla's expected service until January 2023, since the U.S. Constitution stipulates that such appointees serve "until the people fill the vacancies by election".

After lawmakers in the state assembly passed a bill to address the issue that would require voters to select two senators for the same seat—one to serve in the lame-duck session from November 2022 to January 2023 and another for January 2023 to January 2029—Kiley said Newsom should have called a special election to fill Harris's seat much earlier, and that the bill would solve the problem in "the most undemocratic way possible". Newsom signed the bill, which meant California's voters had to vote simultaneously for both the lame-duck Senate seat and the next full Senate term.

== 2021 California gubernatorial recall election ==
Kiley published a book in January 2021 titled Recall Gavin Newsom: The Case Against America's Most Corrupt Governor.

On July 6, 2021, Kiley announced his candidacy for governor of California in the 2021 recall election. According to the New York Times, he was one of the "more moderate Republican recall candidates," while the Los Angeles Times deemed him and John Cox the "more traditional conservatives" in the election.

Kiley indicated his support for school choice during the campaign and said teachers' unions in the state were too powerful (with the California Teachers Association having been Newsom's top donor), to students' detriment. Though vaccinated against COVID-19, Kiley pledged to overturn vaccine and mask mandates Newsom implemented if he became governor.

The recall election failed, with voters retaining governor Gavin Newsom by a 62%–38% margin. Kiley finished sixth among candidates to replace Newsom. He received 3.5% of the vote, or 255,490 votes total, finishing behind Republicans Larry Elder, Kevin Faulconer, and John H. Cox and Democrats Kevin Paffrath and Brandon M. Ross.

== U.S. House of Representatives ==
=== Elections ===
==== 2022 ====
On December 29, 2021, Kiley announced he would run for the U.S. House in 2022 in California's newly redrawn 3rd congressional district, which includes all or parts of Inyo, Sacramento, Mono, Alpine, El Dorado, Placer, Nevada, Sierra, Yuba, and Plumas counties. He won the election, defeating Democratic candidate Kermit Jones.

==== 2024 ====
Kiley was re-elected in 2024, defeating Democratic candidate Jessica Morse 46,179 votes.

==== 2026 ====
Following a Democratic Party-friendly 2025 redistricting process, on March 2, 2026, Kiley announced he would run for election in the redrawn 6th district rather than seeking re-election in the 3rd district. Later, on March 6, Kiley filed for re-election as an independent. He was defeated by Democrat Richard Pan in the general election in November.

=== Tenure ===
In March 2024, Kiley introduced a joint resolution under the Congressional Review Act to overturn a Department of Labor rule governing whether workers are classified as employees or independent contractors under the Fair Labor Standards Act. Senator Bill Cassidy introduced a companion resolution in the Senate. The House Committee on Education and the Workforce reported Kiley's resolution favorably in April 2024, but it did not receive a House floor vote or become law before the end of the 118th Congress.

Kiley supports ending California High-Speed Rail and authored legislation to prohibit federal funding for the project.

On February 11, 2026, Kiley was one of six House Republicans who voted for a resolution to end the national emergency underpinning President Trump's tariffs on Canadian imports. The resolution passed the House by a vote of 219–211. Later that month, he introduced legislation to prevent states from retroactively taxing the assets of former residents, targeting a provision of the proposed 2026 California billionaire tax initiative.

On March 9, 2026, Kiley changed his party affiliation from Republican to Independent, while saying he would continue to caucus with Republicans in order to maintain his committee assignments.

On May 13, 2026, Kiley supplied the 218th signature on a discharge petition for the Ukraine Support Act, reaching the threshold required to force a House vote despite opposition from Republican leadership. The legislation proposed additional assistance and loans to Ukraine and sanctions against Russia.

=== Committee assignments ===
Kiley was appointed to the following committees/subcommittees for the 119th United States Congress. When Kiley left the Republican Conference, his committee assignments were vacated on March 18, 2026 pursuant to Clause 5B of House Rule 10.

- Committee on Education and Workforce
  - Subcommittee on Early Childhood, Elementary and Secondary Education (Chair)
  - Subcommittee on Higher Education and Workforce Development
- Committee on the Judiciary
  - Subcommittee on Courts, Intellectual Property, Artificial Intelligence, and the Internet
  - Subcommittee on Crime and Federal Government Surveillance
- Committee on Transportation and Infrastructure
  - Subcommittee on Economic Development, Public Buildings and Emergency Management
  - Subcommittee on Highways and Transit
  - Subcommittee on Water Resources and Environment

=== Caucus memberships ===
- Republican Study Committee
- Climate Solutions Caucus
- Congressional Western Caucus

== Personal life ==
Kiley married Chelsee Gardner, a marketing director and former children's pastor, on December 30, 2023, in Pioneer Church in Auburn, California.

Kiley is a non-denominational Christian.

== Electoral history ==
Electoral history of Kevin Kiley
Year	Office		Party	Primary			General			Result	Swing	Ref.
Year	Office		Party	Total	%	P.	Total	%	P.	Result	Swing	Ref.
2016	State Assembly	6th	Republican	22,019	16.34%	2nd	149,415	64.59%	1st	Won	Hold	
2018	State Assembly	6th	Republican	80,843	61.34%	1st	131,284	58.02%	1st	Won	Hold	
2019	State Senate	1st	Republican	54,290	27.88%	2nd	72,169	46.06%	2nd	Lost	Hold	
2020	State Assembly	6th	Republican	104,412	58.02%	1st	178,559	58.96%	1st	Won	Hold	
2021	Governor		Republican				255,490	3.47%	6th	Lost	Hold	
2022	U.S. House	3rd	Republican	93,552	39.69%	1st	181,438	53.65%	1st	Won	Gain	
2024	U.S. House	3rd	Republican	137,397	55.89%	1st	234,246	55.47%	1st	Won	Hold	
2026	U.S. House	6th	Independent	47,165	24.28%	1st	TBD					
Source: Secretary of State of California | Statewide Election Results

== Works ==
- Kevin Kiley (2021). Recall Gavin Newsom: The Case Against America's Most Corrupt Governor. ISBN 9781098361587.

U.S. House of Representatives
Preceded by John Garamendi	Member of the U.S. House of Representatives from California's 3rd congressional district 2023–present	Incumbent
U.S. order of precedence (ceremonial)
Preceded by Jen Kiggans	United States representatives by seniority 323rd	Succeeded by Nick LaLota
