= Bill Filante =

American politician

Member of the California State Assembly from the 9th district
- In office December 4, 1978 – November 30, 1992
- Preceded by: Michael Wornum
- Succeeded by: Phillip Isenberg

Personal details
- Born: October 22, 1929 Brooklyn, New York, U.S.
- Died: December 9, 1992 (aged 63) Terra Linda, California, U.S.
- Party: Republican
- Spouse(s): Mary Margaret Scott, MD (after 1948)
- Children: 3

Military service
- Branch/service: United States Air Force

William Jules Filante (October 22, 1929 – December 9, 1992) was an American physician and politician from California and member of the Republican Party.

== State Assembly ==
Filante first won election to the Marin-Sonoma based 9th district in the California State Assembly in 1978 by defeating Democratic incumbent Michael Wornum. Thanks to his moderate voting record, Filante became a pro at winning crossover votes, enough to hold his left-leaning seat with relative ease for 7 terms. In 1992 he vacated his assembly seat when he ran for election to the Congress.

== Congressional race ==
Filante made a run for the Marin county-based 6th Congressional district being vacated by Democrat Barbara Boxer, who was running for the United States Senate. Even though the 6th District was heavily Democratic, Filante had represented a large chunk of it in the state legislature for 14 years and tried to parlay his moderate reputation into a win. However, just before the start of the campaign, Filante underwent brain surgery and spent most of the race recuperating. Fellow GOP assemblywoman Bev Hansen often served as his surrogate. In the end, Democrat Lynn Woolsey won handily. Filante died of a brain tumor later that December.

== Personal life ==
He was Jewish.

== Electoral history ==
Member, California State Assembly: 1979-1993
Year	Office	Democrat	Votes	Pct	Republican	Votes	Pct
1978	California State Assembly; District 9	Michael Wornum	46,485	43.4%	Bill Filante	55,304	51.7%
1980	California State Assembly; District 9	Anne Charles	59,786	45.2%	Bill Filante	67,603	51.1%
1982	California State Assembly; District 9	Paul Chignell	55,035	44.9%	Bill Filante	67,619	55.1%
1984	California State Assembly; District 9	Paul Chignell	63,867	43.4%	Bill Filante	83,402	56.6%
1986	California State Assembly; District 9	Joanna Willman	53,553	45.1%	Bill Filante	65,154	54.9%
1988	California State Assembly; District 9	Francis Parnell	65,065	43.5%	Bill Filante	84,661	56.5%
1990	California State Assembly; District 9	Vivien Bronshvag	52,659	42.5%	Bill Filante	63,672	51.4%
1992	U.S House of Representatives; District 6	Lynn Woolsey	190,322	66%	Bill Filante	98,171	34%

Political offices
Preceded by Michael Wornum	California State Assembly, 9th District; 1978–1992	Succeeded by Vivien Bronshvag
