= Natomas, Sacramento, California =

Natomas
- Neighborhood of Sacramento
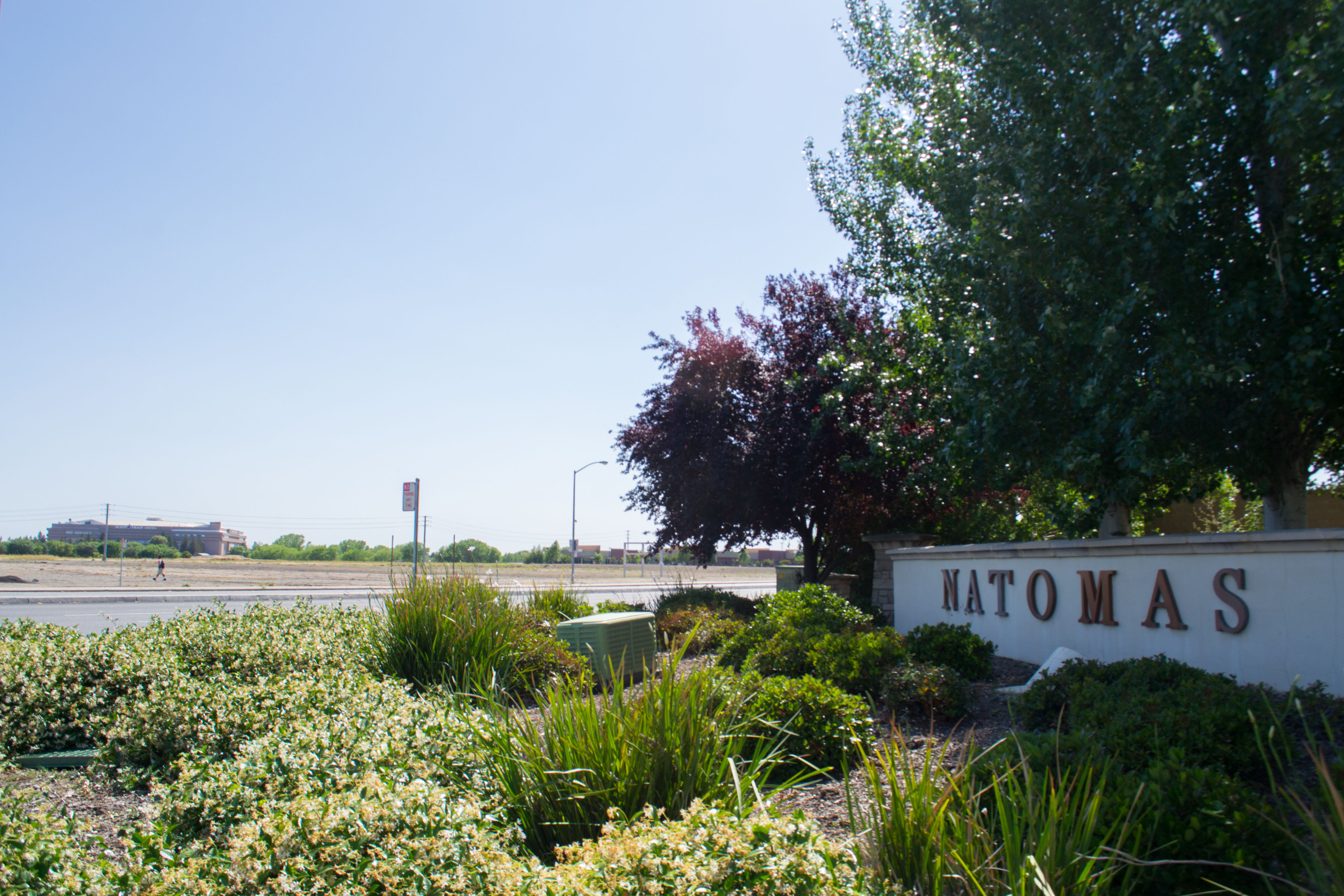
- Natomas marker sign (right foreground) and Sleep Train Arena (now demolished) (left background)
- Interactive map of Natomas
- Coordinates: 38.6459°N 121.5132°W
- Country: United States
- State: California
- County: Sacramento
- City: Sacramento

Government
  - Mayor: Kevin McCarty
  - Sacramento City Councilmember: Lisa Kaplan
  - Sacramento County Representative: Phil Serna

Area
  - Total: 20.15 sq mi (52.19 km^{2})
- Elevation: 26 ft (8 m)
- Time zone: UTC-8 (PST)
  - Summer (DST): UTC-7 (PDT)
- ZIP code: 95833/95834/95835
- Area codes: 916, 279

Natomas is a community in the northwestern section of the city of Sacramento, in the U.S. state of California.

Natomas is generally divided into two areas by Interstate 80: North Natomas and South Natomas. North Natomas was historically an agricultural area on the floodplains of the Sacramento River, but grew quickly starting in the mid-1990s with extensive residential development, office park, and retail construction. South Natomas developed predominantly as residential subdivisions from the 1950s to the 1980s, but in 1982, amended its community plan to permit 2.4 million square feet of new office parks along Interstate 5.

As a major center of employment, retail and entertainment facilities, Natomas is recognized as one of Greater Sacramento's most important edge cities (suburban economic centers) by Joel Garreau, who popularized the term. Natomas is generally defined as south of the Sacramento County line, north of the Garden Highway and the American River, west of the Steelhead Creek, and east of the Sacramento River. The neighborhood school district is Natomas Unified School District.

== Parks and recreation ==
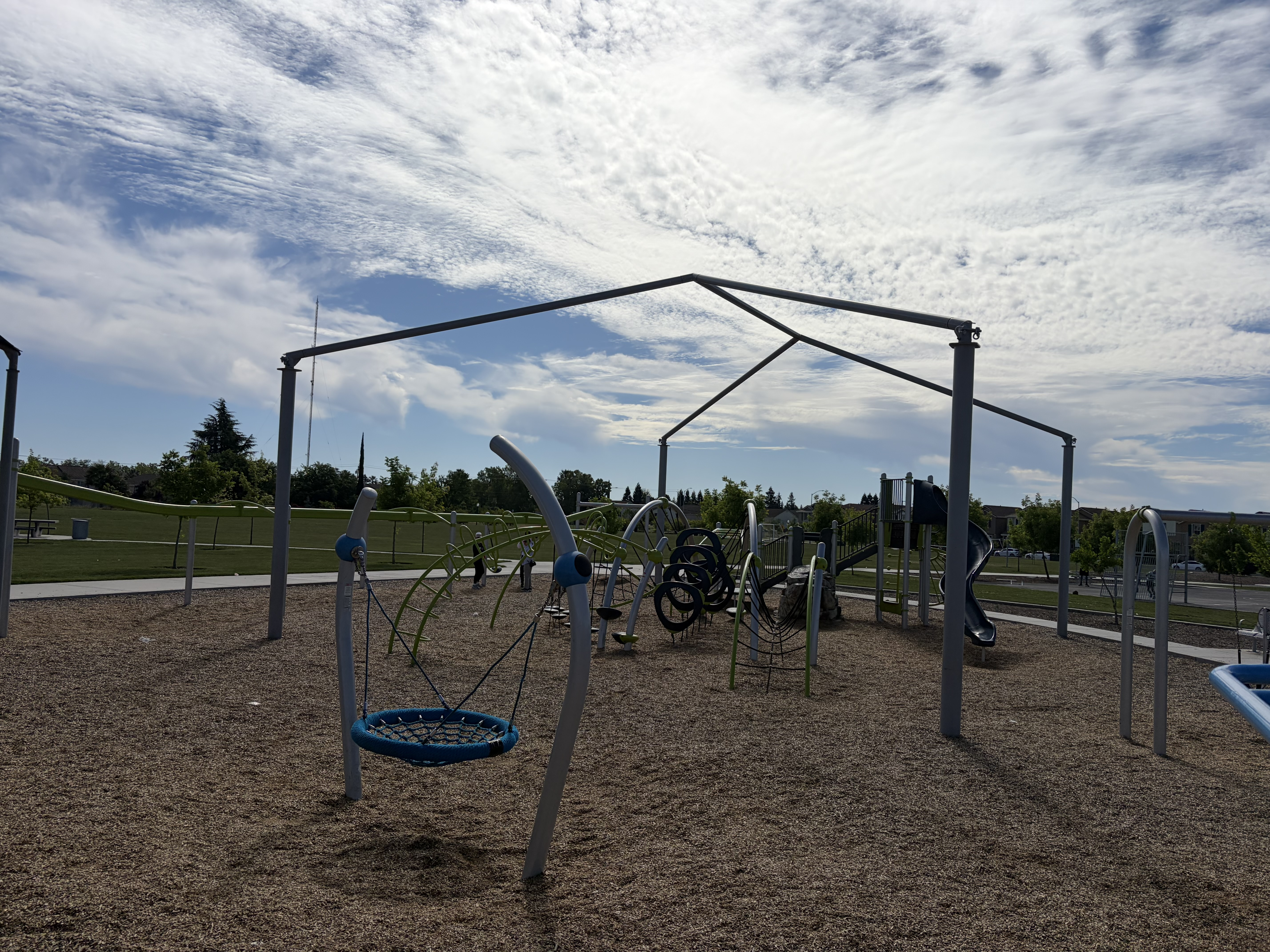
The playground of Airfield Park in Natomas Crossing.

Natomas is also home to a variety of outdoor spaces, including bike trails and parks. One of the newest additions is North Natomas Regional Park. Although it is being completed in phases, it is home to a water spray area for kids, grassy fields, playgrounds, ball fields, picnic areas, two dog parks (one for little and another for big dogs), asphalt and concrete paths for walking and riding, and a permanent farmers' market structure. Jackrabbits, birds of prey, and other wildlife romp in the undeveloped fields adjacent to the developed portions.

== Government ==
Natomas is represented by Lisa Kaplan, the District 1 representative on the Sacramento City Council, and Karina Talamantes, the District 3 representative on the Sacramento City Council as well as by Phil Serna, the District 1 representative on the Sacramento County Board of Supervisors.

In the California State Legislature, Natomas is in the 8th senatorial district, represented by Democrat Angelique Ashby and in the 6th Assembly district, represented by Democrat Maggy Krell.

In the United States House of Representatives, Natomas is in California's 6th congressional district, represented by Democrat Ami Bera.

The Natomas Basin Conservancy serves as plan operator for the Natomas Basin Habitat Conservation Plan. It acquires and manages habitat land for the benefit of the 22 special status species covered under the plan.

== Economy ==
Natomas is a retail and entertainment hub for the metropolitan area, including The Promenade at Sacramento Gateway, Natomas Marketplace, and the Park Place Shopping Center, with many smaller shopping centers scattered throughout the region. Northgate Boulevard is home to further retail businesses and hotels. Natomas is considered, by Joel Garreau who popularized the idea, to be one of the major edge cities, i.e. suburban economic centers, in Greater Sacramento.

ARCO Arena (later Sleep Train Arena) was a major feature of the Natomas area of Sacramento and was the previous home of the NBA's Sacramento Kings, who have since moved to the Golden 1 Center in downtown Sacramento. The arena was torn down in 2022. The Sacramento International Airport is within the bounds of Natomas as defined by Sacramento County, but it is several miles away from the largely populated area of Natomas. Since Natomas is the closest portion of the city to the airport, there are many hotels located throughout the Natomas area. Natomas is a historical flood plain and is therefore subject to flooding. Another feature of this area is the ease of access to Interstate 5, Interstate 80, and the northern portion of Highway 99's route through Sacramento, making it a desirable living area for workers who commute.

== Education ==
Most of the Natomas region is served by the Natomas Unified School District. Small portions are served by Twin Rivers Unified School District.

In South Natomas, elementary schools include American Lakes K-8, Jefferson K-8, Bannon Creek K-8, and Two Rivers Elementary. The main high school is Natomas High School.

In North Natomas, elementary schools on include Natomas Park Elementary (established 2000), Witter Ranch Elementary (established 2004), Heron K-8 (established 2006), H. Allen Hight Elementary (established 2008), and Paso Verde K-8 (established 2017). Natomas Middle School is the traditional middle school and Inderkum High School is the main high school.

Charter schools are a very popular option. Firstly, the district runs a dependent charter school in Southwest Natomas named Leroy Greene Academy, a 6–12 college preparatory secondary school. Independent charter school options include the Star Academy (K-5), Leading Edge Middle School (6-8) and Performing Fine Arts Academy (6–12) which are all part of the Natomas Charter School. Star Academy is located on its own campus in Natomas Crossing while the other schools are located at the main Natomas Charter Campus in Natomas Park. There is also Westlake Charter School (K-8) which moved to a new campus in the Hamptons neighborhood in 2017. Westlake Charter High School has taken over the temporary school warehouse location in Natomas Crossing along East Commerce Way. Natomas Pacific Pathways Prep Academy (K-12, college prep) is located on Del Paso Road near the Westshore neighborhood.

The Northgate region of South Natomas is served by Twin Rivers Unified School District. Students in these areas are assigned to Grant Union High School in Del Paso Heights. There is also a small portion of North Natomas served by Twin Rivers Unified School District. The elementary school is Regency Park Elementary School. The assigned middle school is Norwood (in the Robla area) and Rio Linda High School but many students do not attend those assigned schools and opt for either NUSD schools or for charter schools.

Private preschools also available throughout Natomas, including Merryhill School (Infants-Pre-K).

== Notable residents ==
With the development of Natomas in the 1990s and 2000s, it became a very popular spot for legislators to buy second residences during the real estate boom of the early twenty-first century. Two reasons for its popularity were its relative affordability and proximity to the capitol.

=== Current ===
- Heather Fargo, former mayor of Sacramento (South Natomas)
- Brian Maienschein State Assemblyman from San Diego (Natomas Crossing)
- Richard Pan, medical doctor and first assemblyman elected to actually have a permanent residence in Natomas area (Natomas Park)
- Blanca Rubio, State Assemblywoman from Baldwin Park (Natomas Park)
- Susan Rubio, State Senator from Baldwin Park (Westlake)

=== Former ===
- Karen Bass, current Los Angeles mayor and former speaker of the Assembly from Los Angeles (South Natomas)
- John J. Benoit, state senator from Palm Desert (Willowcreek)
- Mike Bibby, former New York Knicks and Sacramento Kings point guard who owned 2 different homes (Westlake)
- John B. T. Campbell III, congressman from Newport Beach, who lived in Natomas while he served in the state legislature (Sundance Lake)
- Dave Cogdill, former Senate minority leader (North Natomas)
- Joe Coto, state assemblymember from San Jose and former superintendent of schools in Oakland (South Natomas)
- DeMarcus Cousins, former Sacramento Kings basketball player and all-star center (Westlake)
- Robert Dutton, state senator from Rancho Cucamonga (Heritage Park)
- Michael D. Duvall, former state assemblymember from Yorba Linda (Gateway West)
- Eric the Actor, Wack Packer from The Howard Stern Show
- Alexander Gonzalez, president of Sacramento State University (Westlake)
- Jerry Hill, state assemblyman from San Mateo (Willowcreek)
- Shirley Horton, state assemblymember from San Diego (Willowcreek)
- Bob Huff, state senator from Diamond Bar (Gateway West)
- Rush Limbaugh, conservative commentator (South Natomas)
- Kevin Martin, Houston Rockets player (eventually moved to Midtown)
- Eric Musselman, former Sacramento Kings head coach
- Kenny Natt, former Sacramento Kings head coach (Westlake)
- Jose Solorio, state assemblymember from Santa Ana (Willowcreek)
- Cameron Smyth, state assemblymember from Santa Clarita (Regency Park)
- Beno Udrih, former Sacramento Kings basketball player (Gateway West)
- Corliss Williamson, retired Sacramento Kings basketball player
