= Michael Wornum =

British-American politician

Member of the California State Assembly from the 9th district
- In office December 2, 1974 – November 30, 1978
- Preceded by: Bill Bagley
- Succeeded by: Bill Filante

Personal details
- Born: February 25, 1925 London, England
- Died: June 15, 1995 (aged 70) Larkspur, California, U.S.
- Party: Democratic
- Spouse(s): Barbara Okin; Sandra
- Children: 4
- Education: University of California, Berkeley

Military service
- Allegiance: United Kingdom
- Branch/service: Royal Air Force
- Battles/wars: World War II

Michael Wornum (February 25, 1925 – June 15, 1995) was a British-American politician from California and a member of the Democratic Party. Born in London to a British father (George Grey Wornum) and an American mother (Miriam Alice Gerstle) he moved to California at a young age. He graduated from the University of California, Berkeley with a bachelor's degree in architecture, followed by a master's degree and became a U.S. citizen in 1951.

== Political career ==
Wornum was elected to the Mill Valley City council in 1960, serving twice as mayor. He was elected to the Marin County Board of Supervisors in 1968 and again in 1972. In 1974 he was elected to the California State Assembly and served two terms, losing reelection to Republican physician Bill Filante in 1978. In 1980 he was appointed to the California Coastal Commission by Governor Jerry Brown That same year he was elected to the Larkspur city council, where he also eventually became mayor.

== Death ==
On June 15, 1995 Wornum died of stomach cancer at the age of 70, in Larskpur, California.

== Electoral history ==
Member, California State Assembly: 1974-1978
Year	Office	Democrat	Votes	Pct	Republican	Votes	Pct
1974	California State Assembly; District 9	Michael Wornum	47,758	50.5%	A. Alan Hill	41,290	43.7%
1976	California State Assembly; District 9	Michael Wornum	59,079	49.5%	John Miskimen	55,575	46.6%
1978	California State Assembly; District 9	Michael Wornum	46,485	43.4%	Bill Filante	55,304	51.7%

Political offices
Preceded by Bill Bagley	California State Assembly 9th District; 1974 – 1978	Succeeded by Bill Filante
