= R. R. Ingels =

American politician

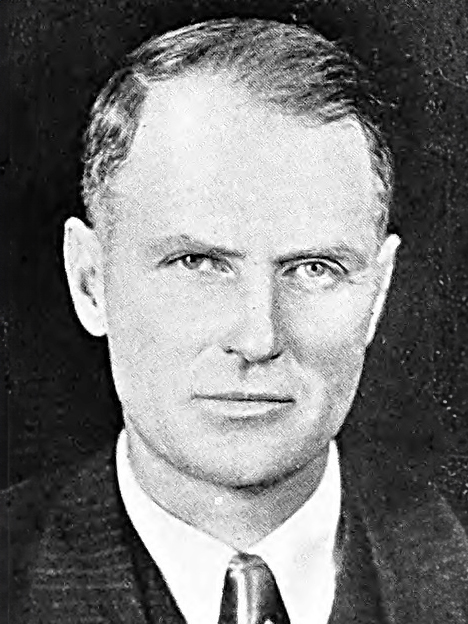
- Official portrait, 1932

Member of the California Senate from the 4th district
- In office January 5, 1931 – January 7, 1935
- Preceded by: Fred C. Handy
- Succeeded by: George Milton Biggar

Member of the California State Assembly from the 6th district
- In office January 7, 1929 – January 5, 1931
- Preceded by: Charles B. Melville
- Succeeded by: George Milton Biggar

Personal details
- Born: August 28, 1890 Kokomo, Indiana, U.S.
- Died: May 12, 1958 (aged 67)
- Party: Republican

Military service
- Branch/service: United States Army
- Battles/wars: World War I

Russel Ray Ingels (August 28, 1890 – May 12, 1958) was an American politician who served in the California State Assembly for the 6th district from 1929 to 1931 and California State Senate for the 4th district from 1931 to 1935. During World War I he served in the United States Army. He later became a state senator.
