= Leroy Greene Academy =

School in Sacramento, California, United States

Coordinates: 38.6108°N 121.5286°W

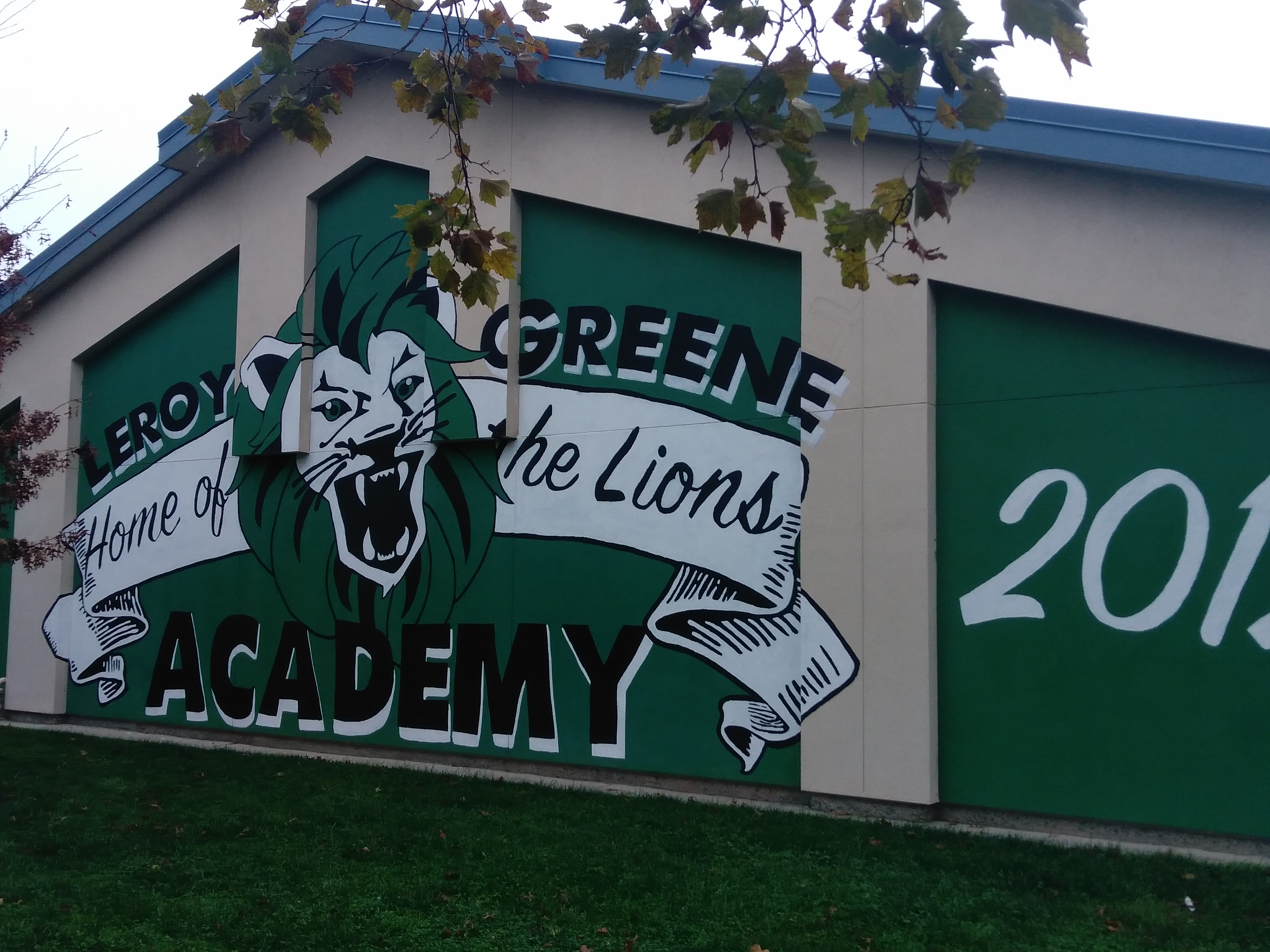
- A mural at Leroy Greene Academy
- Sacramento, California, United States

Information
- Type: Public charter school
- Established: 2012
- Grades: 6–12

Leroy Greene Academy (usually abbreviated "LGA") is an American public high school and middle school in Sacramento, California, serving grades 6–12 in the Natomas Unified School District.

== History ==
Leroy Greene Academy was first opened on August 15, 2012. It was named after the politician Leroy F. Greene in honor of his contribution to public schools with the School Facilities Act of 1998. The school released the following statement on why the Natomas Unified School District decided to name Leroy Greene Academy after him:

California Senator Leroy F. Greene sponsored many bills and measures in education during his 36-year legislative career such as the Leroy F. Greene School Facilities Act of 1998 which requires the State Allocation Board to certify funding for modernization and construction of school facilities. Following his departure from the legislature, Sen. Leroy F. Greene was honored by the Natomas Unified School District for his service to the education system by naming one of its schools after him. While Leroy Greene Academy is a charter school with innovative programs in the Natomas Unified School District, everyone was in agreement that Sen. Greene still deserved recognition for his impact on California education.

=== Leroy F. Greene Middle School ===
Leroy Greene Academy was preceded by Leroy F. Greene Middle School, which was opened on July 1, 1980, serving grades 6-8. It was closed by the Natomas Unified School District in 2010 as a cost-saving measure and also due to the school's failure to reach academic benchmarks. Leroy F. Greene was closed instead of an elementary school. The Natomas Buzz wrote:

Interim superintendent Dr. General Davie today announced he will present board members with a plan that would avert elementary school closures by instead closing Leroy F. Greene Middle School. The proposal shifts 6th graders to existing K-5 schools and relocates 7th and 8th graders to Natomas Middle School.

In 2009, Leroy F. Greene won the PTA Healthy Lifestyles award.

=== Leroy Greene Academy ===
Two years after Leroy F. Greene middle school closed, and after an extensive $7.2 million renovation project, Leroy Greene Academy was established as NUSD's first dependent charter school. The school opened with Angela Herrera as its principal and Carolyn Walker as its assistant principal. During its first school year (2012–13), it served 7th and 8th graders and increased its maximum grade each year until it reached 12th grade (in 2015, the school's programs expanded to include 6th grade as well). The charter petition theoretically allowed for Leroy Greene Academy to serve grades K–12, but to this day it only serves grades 6–12.

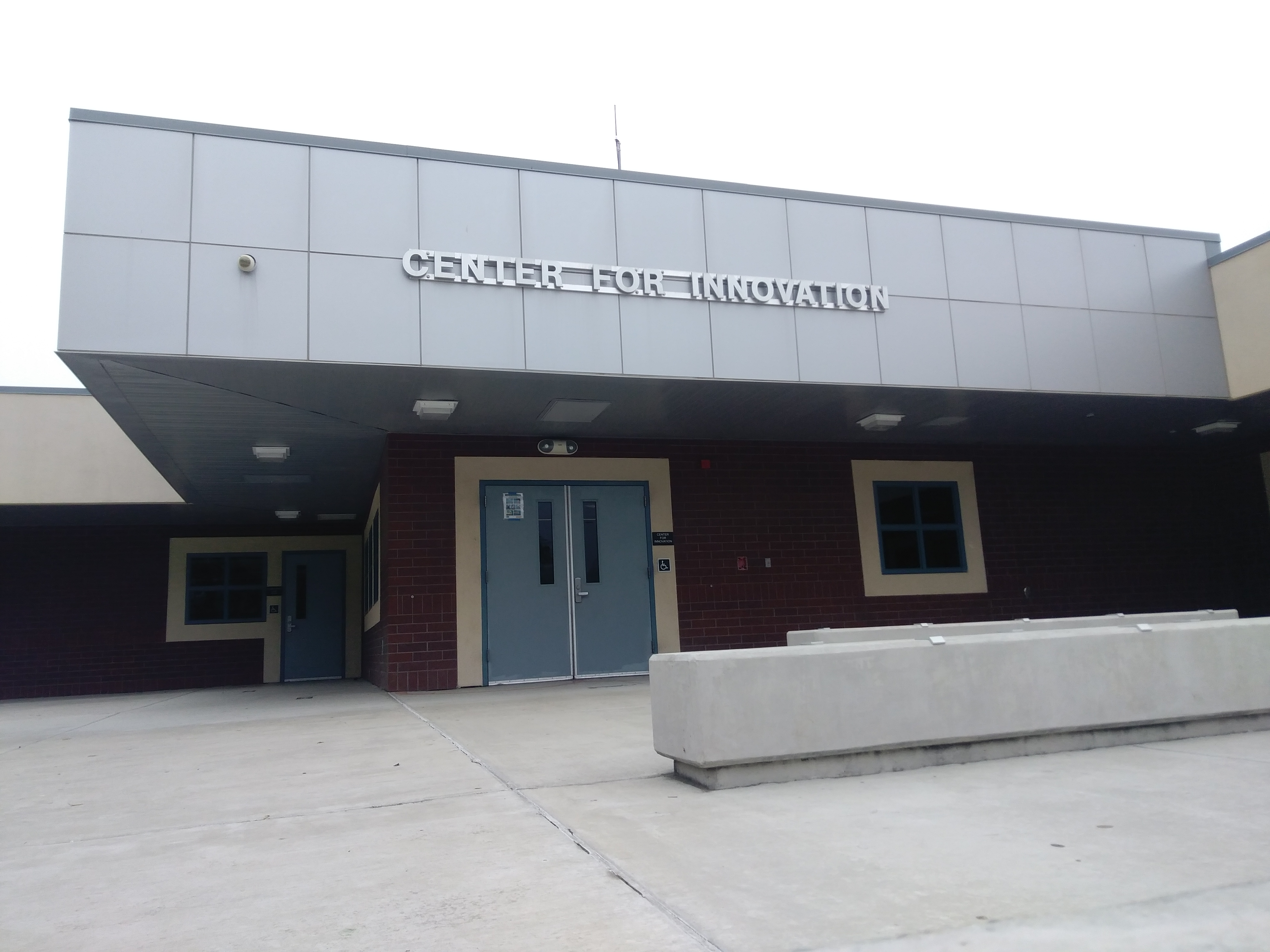
The Center for Innovation

During the 2017–18 school year, the library was removed and replaced with the "Center for Innovation" to better reflect the school's business program.

== Academics ==
Leroy Greene's two main programs of study are art and business. It has elective classes that include Spanish, music, and STEAM (science, technology, engineering, art, and math).

During the 2018–19 school year, CAASPP test results showed that 47.5% of students met or exceeded the standard for ELA and 24.4% of students met or exceeded the standard for math. Only 24.55% of students did not meet the standard for ELA, and 43.2% did not meet the standard for math.

According to data collected during the 2019–20 school year, Leroy Greene's graduation rate is 100%.

== Demographics ==
According to a report on the 2019–20 school year, Leroy Greene's ethnic demographics are 13.3% African American, 0.5% American Indian or Alaska Native, 9.2% Asian, 3.6% Filipino, 45.2% Hispanic or Latino, 1.0% Pacific Islander, 19.8% White, and 7.3% two or more races.

As of November 2021, there are 778 students enrolled at Leroy Greene Academy and 66 English language learners, making up 8.5% of the total population.

== Athletics ==
Leroy Greene is a member of the California Interscholastic Federation and offers sports for middle school and high school. Sports for boys include baseball, basketball, cross country, golf, soccer, and volleyball. Sports for girls include basketball, golf, cross country, soccer, softball, and volleyball.
