= Beth Gaines =

Business woman and politician from California

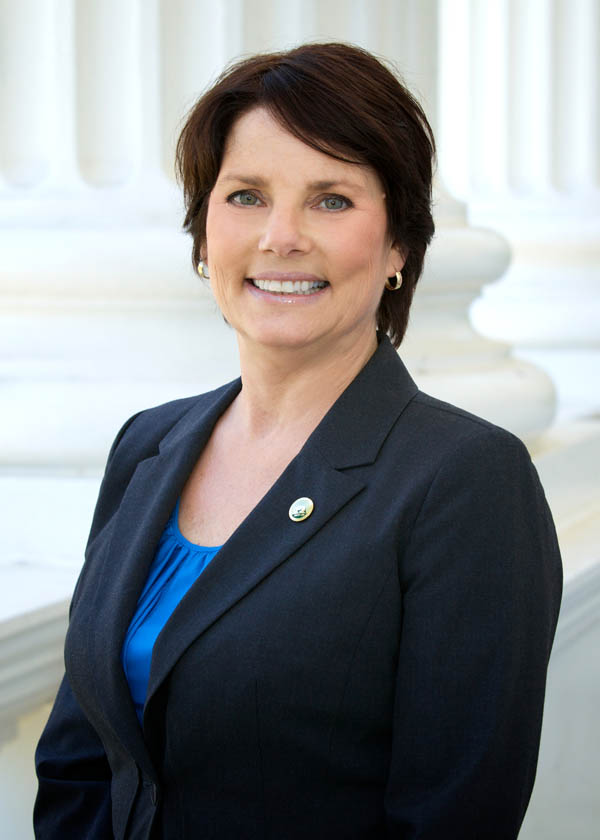

Member of the California State Assembly
- In office May 12, 2011 – November 30, 2016
- Preceded by: Ted Gaines
- Succeeded by: Kevin Kiley
- Constituency: 4th district (2011–2012); 6th district (2012–2016)

Personal details
- Born: Beth Arlene Burkhard; September 17, 1959 (age 66) Sacramento, California, U.S.
- Party: Republican
- Spouse: Ted Gaines
- Children: 6
- Education: University of California, Irvine

Beth Burkhard Gaines (born September 17, 1959) is an American politician who served as a member of the California State Assembly for the 6th district from 2011 to 2016.

== Early life and education ==
Gaines was born in Sacramento County, California in 1959. She attended the University of California, Irvine.

== Career ==
In 2011, Gaines' husband, Ted Gaines, won a special election to the California State Senate. On May 3, 2011, Gaines won a special election and became a Republican member of California State Assembly for from the 4th district. Gaines defeated Dennis Campanale with 55.6% of the votes.

== Electoral history ==
Beth Gaines electoral history

2014 California's 6th State Assembly district primary
Party	Candidate	Votes	%	±%
Republican	Beth Gaines (incumbent)	55,167	64.34%	
Democratic	Brian Caples	30,575	35.66%	
Total votes		'85,742'	'100.00%'	

2014 California's 6th State Assembly district election
Party	Candidate	Votes	%	±%
Republican	Beth Gaines (incumbent)	94,020	65.72%	
Democratic	Brian Caples	49,044	34.28%	
Total votes		'143,064'	'100.00%'	

== Personal life ==
Gaines' husband is Ted Gaines. They have six children.
