= Lynn Woolsey =

American politician (born 1937)

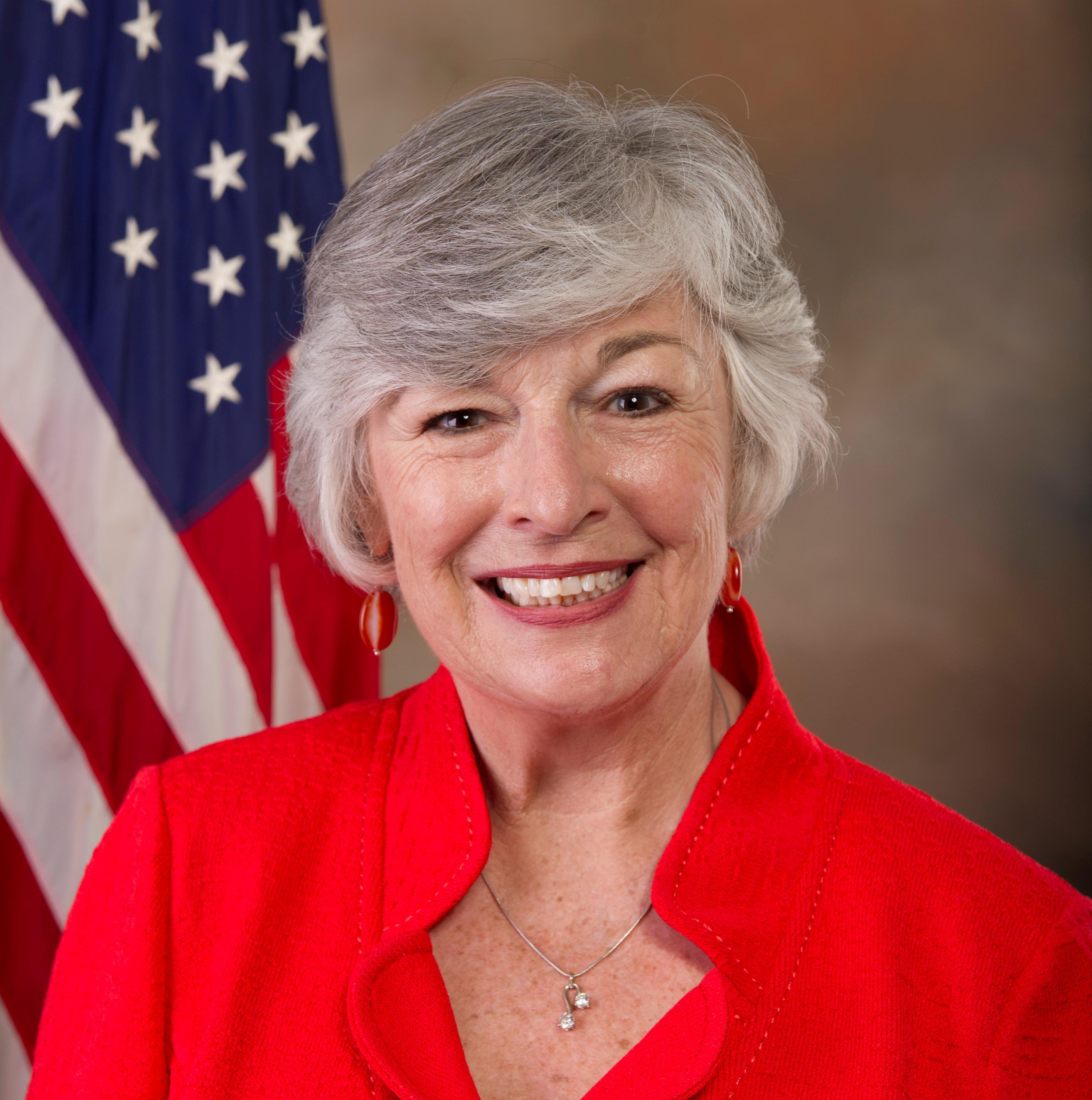

Member of the U.S. House of Representatives from California's 6th district
- In office January 3, 1993 – January 3, 2013
- Preceded by: Barbara Boxer
- Succeeded by: Jared Huffman

Personal details
- Born: Lynn Carol Robinson; November 3, 1937 (age 88) Seattle, Washington, U.S.
- Party: Democratic
- Spouses: Terry Critchett (m. 1958; div. 1968); David Woolsey (m. 1971, divorced)
- Children: 4
- Education: University of Washington (attended); University of San Francisco (BS)
- Woolsey's voice Woolsey on National Women's History Month. Recorded March 7, 2001

Lynn Carol Woolsey (née Robinson; born November 3, 1937) is an American politician who served in the United States House of Representatives from California from 1993 to 2013. She was a member of the Democratic Party and represented California's 6th congressional district.

During her time in Congress, Woolsey was a strong advocate for social and economic justice, and she was a vocal opponent of the Iraq War. She worked to promote universal healthcare, improve access to education, and expand workers' rights. She also authored and co-sponsored several pieces of legislation, including the Family and Medical Leave Act, which provides job protection for workers who need time off to care for themselves or their families.

Woolsey was also a strong advocate for environmental protection and played a key role in efforts to protect the Northern California coastline. She was a co-founder of the Congressional Progressive Caucus and served as its co-chair for several years.

Prior to her time in Congress, Woolsey served on the Petaluma, California City Council, and as Mayor of Petaluma. She also worked as a high school teacher and was involved in various community organizations.

After leaving Congress, Woolsey remained active in politics and advocacy, and she continued to be involved in efforts to promote progressive causes and improve the lives of working people.

== Early life, education and career ==
Woolsey was born Lynn Carol Robinson in Seattle, Washington. Woolsey graduated from Lincoln High School in 1955. She was educated at the University of Washington, where she became a member of Alpha Phi sorority, but left school early to marry Terry J. Critchett in 1958. She moved to Marin County in Northern California and enrolled at the University of San Francisco. Her husband left the family, leaving Woolsey to raise her three children alone, and they divorced in 1968. She received public assistance to make ends meet while working and finishing her education. She married David C. Woolsey in 1971, and raised another child, but that marriage also ended in divorce. She later became a human resources manager and business owner, a teacher at the College of Marin and the Dominican University of California, and a member of the Petaluma, California, City Council before running for Congress.

== U.S. House of Representatives ==
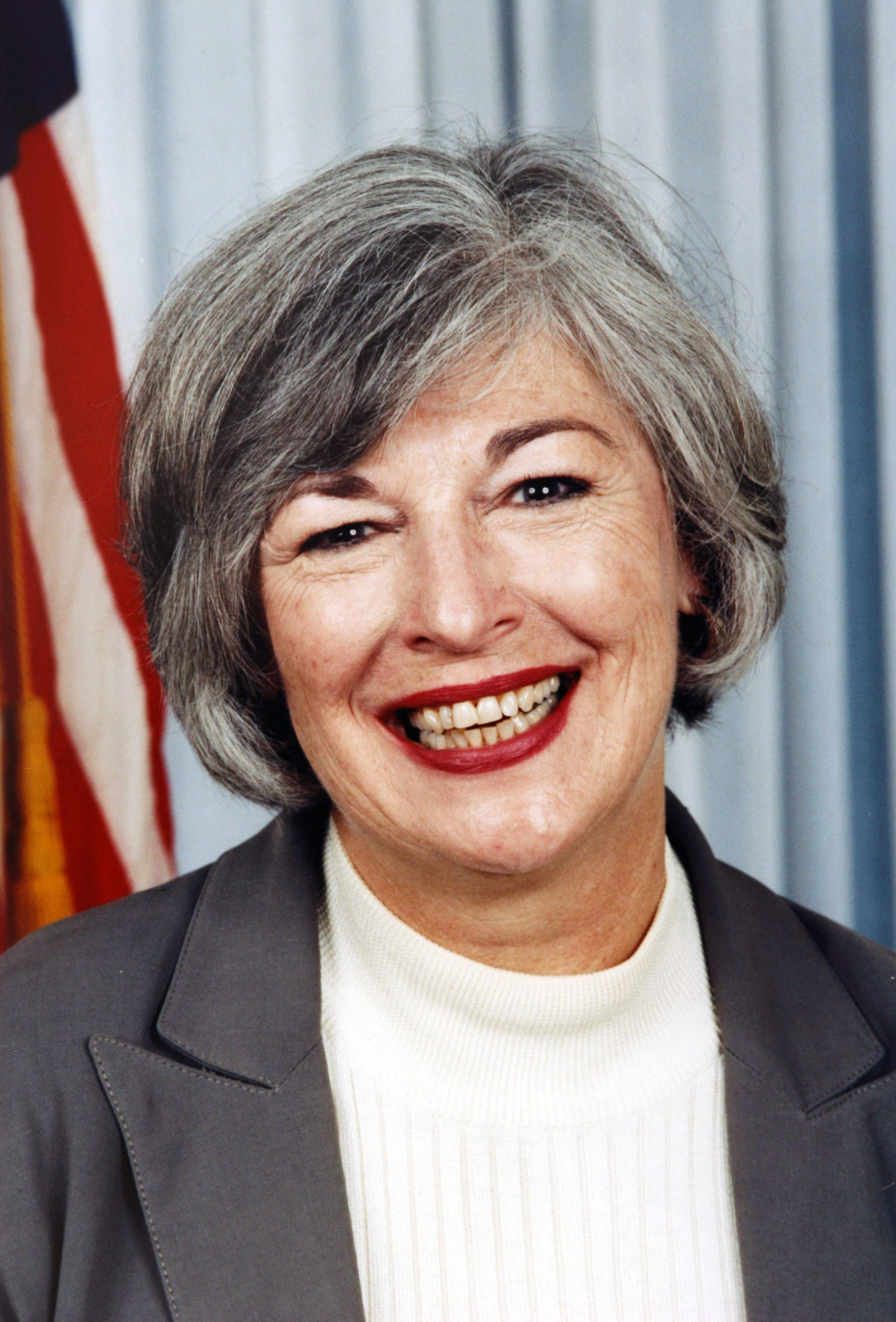
Lynn Woolsey, undated photo

=== Political campaigns ===
In 1992, five-term Congresswoman Barbara Boxer gave up her seat to make a successful run for the Senate. Woolsey entered a nine-way Democratic primary. Seven of her opponents lived in Marin County and split that county's vote, allowing Woolsey to win the nomination with 26 percent of the vote. In the general election, she faced Republican Assemblyman Bill Filante, who was diagnosed with a brain tumor and did not actively campaign. Woolsey won with 65 percent of the vote.

Woolsey was reelected eight times with no substantial opposition.

=== Tenure ===
Woolsey was ranked as the most liberal member of Congress in 2012 by That's My Congress.

==== Welfare reform ====
She quickly made her presence known, drawing upon her experience in vocal opposition to the major welfare reform initiative negotiated by House Speaker Newt Gingrich and President Bill Clinton in the mid-1990s. She later led efforts to restore programmatic funding for services such as child care, nutrition, and paid parental leave. She also passed legislation increasing the power of the IRS to enforce payment of delinquent child support.

==== Iraq ====
Woolsey was an outspoken opponent of the War in Iraq. On October 10, 2002, she was among 133 members of the House who voted against authorizing the invasion of Iraq. She took an active role in opposing continued U.S. presence, leading 15 members of Congress in writing a letter to President George W. Bush dated January 12, 2005, calling for the withdrawal of U.S. from Iraq. She also among the first Members of Congress to call for a troop withdrawal, when she introduced H.Con. Res. 35 on January 26, 2005. Woolsey gave war protester Cindy Sheehan a guest pass to attend Bush's 2006 State of the Union speech. Sheehan's attendance at the speech became noted when she was arrested for wearing a T-shirt with a political message. In the lead up to the 2008 elections, Woolsey, encouraged leaders of anti-war groups to field primary challenges to any Democrat who refused to support a vote ending the war in Iraq. In response, 15 members of the Blue Dog Coalition, a conservative-centrist group within the Democratic Party caucus in the House Representatives in safe seats, refused to contribute party dues to the Democratic Congressional Campaign Committee (DCCC). Woolsey later stated that she was misunderstood, but the Blue Dogs continued the boycott.

==== Indian gaming ====
Woolsey introduced the Graton Rancheria Restoration Act on August 6, 1998. It was signed by President Clinton as Title XIV of the Omnibus Indian Advancement Act in December 2000.

Woolsey testified in support of H.R. 946, citing her approval for the clause restricting gaming on land that is "taken into trust for the tribes."

Woolsey's original bill (H.R. 4434, later H.R. 946) would not have permitted the Federated Indians of Graton Rancheria to have an Indian casino. Senator Barbara Boxer removed that prohibition when she included Woolsey's bill in the Omnibus Act.

In response, Woolsey introduced H.R. 2656 (which never left the House Resources Committee) and appeared frequently at local town-hall meetings, saying that the Miwok Indians double-crossed her by seeking to legalize gambling on their reservation.

==== Scouting for All Act ====
In September 2000, Woolsey sponsored H.R. 4892, the Scouting for All Act, to revoke the charter held by the Boy Scouts of America.

==== Recognition of Ramadan ====
On December 11, 2007, Woolsey, along with 8 other Democrats, voted ‘nay’ on a resolution to recognize the importance of "Christmas and the Christian faith" but did vote to "recognize the commencement of Ramadan",’ a Muslim religious observance in October.

==== Health care ====
Woolsey introduced a bill to revive the public option on July 22, 2010. The Congressional Budget Office projected that the legislation would save $68 billion between 2014 and 2020.

She was strongly critical of the Stupak-Pitts Amendment, which prevents private health insurance plans from covering abortion if the plan is subsidized by tax breaks in the context of the November 2009 Affordable Health Care for America Act.

=== Committee assignments ===
- Committee on Education and the Workforce
  - Subcommittee on Early Childhood, Elementary and Secondary Education
  - Subcommittee on Workforce Protections (Ranking Member)
- Committee on Science, Space and Technology
  - Subcommittee on Energy and Environment

=== Caucuses ===
- Congressional Progressive Caucus (Co-chair)

== Controversies ==
=== Stuart Pearson letter ===
On December 2, 2003, Woolsey wrote a letter on behalf of Stuart Pearson, the son of one of her senior aides, who had pleaded guilty to rape. In a letter written on her official congressional stationery, she asked the judge to consider mitigating circumstances and show leniency. The judge in the case was not swayed by the letter, and sentenced Pearson to eight years in prison, the maximum allowed under the plea bargain. Woolsey has apologized for writing the letter, saying she did not know all the facts; the victim did not accept her apology.

=== Objection to 2004 presidential election results ===
Woolsey was one of thirty-one House Democrats who voted to not count the electoral votes from Ohio in the 2004 presidential election. President George W. Bush won Ohio by 118,457 votes. Without Ohio's electoral votes, the election would have been decided by the U.S. House of Representatives, with each state having one vote in accordance with the Twelfth Amendment to the United States Constitution.

=== Darfur protest arrest ===
Woolsey was arrested April 27, 2009, outside the embassy of Sudan in Washington, D.C., during a protest against genocide in Darfur. Woolsey and four other U.S. lawmakers were protesting the blocking of aid to victims. They were arrested on a charge of trespassing after they crossed a police line.

Other Democratic House members arrested were Jim McGovern, Donna Edwards, Keith Ellison and John Lewis.

== Legacy ==
Woolsey's congressional papers are preserved in Special Collections and University Archives at the Sonoma State University Library.

== Electoral history ==
United States House of Representatives elections, 1992
Party	Candidate	Votes	%
Democratic	Lynn Woolsey	190,322	65.2
Republican	Bill Filante	98,171	33.6
No party	Write-in	3,293	1.1
Total votes		291,786	100.0
Turnout			
Democratic hold			

United States House of Representatives elections, 1994
Party	Candidate	Votes	%
Democratic	Lynn Woolsey (incumbent)	137,642	58.1
Republican	Michael J. Nugent	88,940	37.5
Libertarian	Louis Beary	6,203	2.6
Peace and Freedom	Ernest K. Jones, Jr.	4,055	1.7
Total votes		236,840	100.0
Turnout			
Democratic hold			

United States House of Representatives elections, 1996
Party	Candidate	Votes	%
Democratic	Lynn Woolsey (incumbent)	156,958	61.6
Republican	Duane C. Hughes	86,278	33.8
Peace and Freedom	Ernest K. Jones, Jr.	6,459	2.5
Natural Law	Bruce Kendall	5,240	2.1
Total votes		254,935	100.0
Turnout			
Democratic hold			

United States House of Representatives elections, 1998
Party	Candidate	Votes	%
Democratic	Lynn Woolsey (incumbent)	158,446	68.0
Republican	Ken McAuliffe	69,295	29.7
Natural Law	Alan R. Barreca	5,240	2.2
Total votes		232,981	100.0
Turnout			
Democratic hold			

United States House of Representatives elections, 2000
Party	Candidate	Votes	%
Democratic	Lynn Woolsey (incumbent)	182,166	64.3
Republican	Ken McAuliffe	80,169	28.3
Green	Justin Moscoso	13,248	4.7
Libertarian	Richard O. Barton	4,691	1.9
Natural Law	Alan R. Barreca	2,894	1.1
Total votes		283,118	100.0
Turnout			
Democratic hold			

United States House of Representatives elections, 2002
Party	Candidate	Votes	%
Democratic	Lynn Woolsey (incumbent)	139,750	66.7
Republican	Paul L. Erickson	62,052	29.7
Libertarian	Richard O. Barton	4,936	2.3
Reform	Jeff Rainforth	2,825	1.3
Total votes		209,563	100.0
Turnout			
Democratic hold			

United States House of Representatives elections, 2004
Party	Candidate	Votes	%
Democratic	Lynn Woolsey (incumbent)	226,423	72.7
Republican	Paul L. Erickson	85,244	27.3
Total votes		311,667	100.0
Turnout			
Democratic hold			

United States House of Representatives elections, 2006
Party	Candidate	Votes	%
Democratic	Lynn Woolsey (incumbent)	173,190	70.3
Republican	Todd Hooper	64,405	26.1
Libertarian	Richard W. Friesen	9,028	3.6
Total votes		246,623	100.0
Turnout			
Democratic hold			

United States House of Representatives elections, 2008
Party	Candidate	Votes	%
Democratic	Lynn Woolsey (incumbent)	229,672	71.7
Republican	Mike Halliwell	77,073	24.1
Libertarian	Joel R. Smolen	13,617	4.2
Total votes		320,362	100.0
Turnout			
Democratic hold			

United States House of Representatives elections, 2010
Party	Candidate	Votes	%
Democratic	Lynn Woolsey (incumbent)	172,216	66.0
Republican	Jim Judd	77,361	29.7
Peace and Freedom	Eugene F. Ruyle	5,915	2.2
Libertarian	Joel R. Smolen	5,660	2.1
Total votes		261,152	100.0
Turnout			
Democratic hold			

== See also ==
- Women in the United States House of Representatives

U.S. House of Representatives
Preceded by Barbara Boxer	Member of the U.S. House of Representatives from California's 6th congressional district 1993–2013	Succeeded by Doris Matsui
Party political offices
Preceded by Peter DeFazio	Chair of the Congressional Progressive Caucus; 2005–2011; Served alongside: Barbara Lee, Raúl Grijalva	Succeeded by Keith Ellison
U.S. order of precedence (ceremonial)
Preceded by Tom Latham as Former U.S. Representative	Order of precedence of the United States as Former U.S. Representative	Succeeded by Loretta Sanchez as Former U.S. Representative
