= Inderkum High School =

Location
- 2500 New Market Drive; Sacramento, California; United States

Information
- Type: Public
- School district: Natomas Unified School District
- Superintendent: Robyn Castillo
- Principal: Jeffrey "Scott" Pitts
- Grades: 9–12
- Gender: Co-ed
- Enrollment: 2,242 (2023–2024)
- Colors: Blue and Gold
- Nickname: Tigers
- Website: Inderkum High School

Inderkum High School is a public high school located in the Natomas neighborhood of Sacramento, California, United States. Serving grades 9 through 12 within the Natomas Unified School District, it is an International Baccalaureate World School.

== History ==
Inderkum High School opened in 2004. The school is named after Frank Inderkum, a dairy farmer who previously owned the land where the campus was built.

The primary feeder middle schools for Inderkum are Natomas Middle, Heron K–8, and Paso Verde K-8. Students from local charter schools, including Westlake Charter, Natomas Charter, Leroy Greene Academy, and Natomas Pacific Pathways Prep, also have the option to attend Inderkum.

== Academics ==
Inderkum has offered the International Baccalaureate Diploma Programme (DP) since 2012, with its first cohort graduating in 2016. Freshmen and sophomores participate in the IB Middle Years Programme (MYP). Through its integration with local elementary and middle schools, Natomas Unified established the first transitional kindergarten through 12th-grade IB continuum in the Sacramento area.

The California Early College Academy (CECA) was established at Inderkum during the 2013–2014 school year. The program allows 9th and 10th-grade students to complete preparatory coursework that enables them to take academic classes at American River College during their 11th and 12th-grade years.

== Campus ==
The Inderkum campus was designed with significant green building features, utilizing highly energy-efficient architecture. The school's infrastructure includes electricity-generating photovoltaic panels, a geothermal ground loop system, low-velocity cooling displacement, and radiant slab heating.

The campus includes Dave Tooker Stadium, named after the former superintendent of Natomas Unified, which opened in 2008 and received an upgraded all-weather turf field and track in 2019. Additionally, a 23,000-square-foot library is located adjacent to the campus. The library, which features a roof shaped like an open book, operates through a joint partnership between the Natomas Unified School District, the Los Rios Community College District, and the Sacramento Public Library system.

== Extracurricular activities ==
=== Athletics ===
Inderkum participates in the Capital Valley Conference (Division 2) of the Sac-Joaquin Section under the California Interscholastic Federation (CIF). The school's athletic programs include baseball, basketball, cheerleading, cross country, football, golf, soccer, softball, swimming, tennis, track and field, volleyball, water polo, and wrestling.

=== Music ===
The Inderkum music program includes over 350 student members. The department offers multiple ensembles, including Concert Band, Symphonic Band, Wind Ensemble, Marching Band, Orchestra, Jazz Band, and Color Guard. It is the second-largest extracurricular program at the school following athletics.

== Notable alumni ==
- Elisse Joson – Filipino actress, model, and endorser
- Vince Mayle – former American football tight end in the National Football League (NFL)
- Eric Pinkins – former American football linebacker and safety in the NFL
- Roman Rashada – college football defensive back for the Arizona State Sun Devils

== See also ==
- Natomas Unified School District
- List of high schools in California
