= USC&GS Natoma =

Patrol vessel of the United States Navy

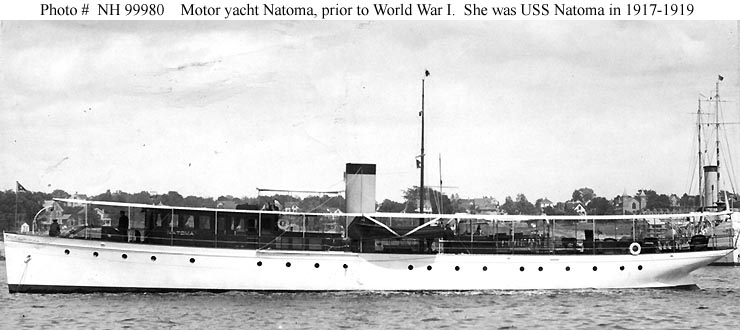
- Natoma in private use prior to her U.S. Navy service.

History
- Name: Natoma
- Owner: Charles H. Foster; R. Howe
- Port of registry: Chicago, IL
- Builder: Gas Engine and Power Company and Charles L. Seabury and Sons, Morris Heights, New York
- Yard number: 2337
- Completed: 1913
- Identification: U.S. Official Number 211436
- Fate: Sold to U.S. Navy 1917

General characteristics
- Type: Motor yacht
- Tonnage: 112 GRT; 76 NRT
- Length: 119 ft (36.3 m) overall; 118.9 ft (36.2 m) registry length; 112 ft (34.1 m) waterline
- Beam: 17.1 ft (5.2 m)
- Depth: 8.5 ft (2.6 m)
- Propulsion: 2 X 8½ X 10 Speedway gasoline engines, total 330 hp
- Speed: 14 mph (12 kn; 23 km/h); 16 mph (14 kn; 26 km/h) maximum
- Crew: 4

History

United States
- Name: Natoma
- Namesake: Previous name retained
- Cost: acquisition price: $45,000 USD
- Acquired: 4 July 1917
- Commissioned: 23 August 1917
- Fate: Transferred to United States Coast and Geodetic Survey 4 April 1919
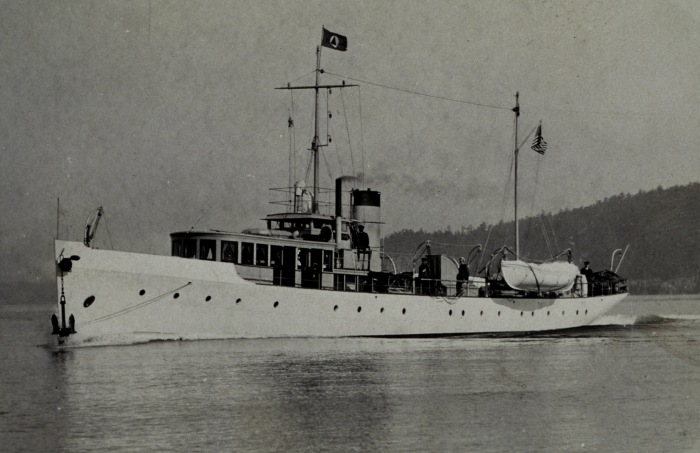
- USC&GS Natoma in 1928. Note U.S. Coast and Geodetic Survey flag flying at top of foremast.

United States
- Name: Natoma
- Namesake: Previous name retained
- Acquired: 4 April 1919
- Commissioned: 1919
- Decommissioned: 1935

General characteristics (as U.S. Navy vessel)
- Type: Patrol vessel
- Tonnage: 112 GRT; 76 NRT
- Displacement: 112 tons
- Length: 120 ft (37 m) overall; 116 ft (35 m) between perpendiculars
- Beam: 17 ft 6 in (5.33 m)
- Draft: 5 ft 6 in (1.68 m) mean
- Propulsion: same as yacht
- Speed: 10 knots
- Range: 850 nmi (980 mi; 1,570 km)
- Complement: 49
- Armament: 1 × 3-pounder gun; 1 × .30-caliber (7.62-millimeter machine gun

General characteristics (as U.S. Coast and Geodetic Survey vessel)
- Type: Survey ship
- Displacement: 112 tons
- Length: 120 ft (37 m)
- Beam: 17 ft 6 in (5.33 m)
- Draft: 5 ft (1.5 m)
- Speed: 10 knots

USC&GS Natoma was built as the private motorboat Natoma in 1913 for Charles H. Foster, President of the Cadillac Motor Car Company of Chicago. In 1917 the United States Navy acquired the boat for use in World War I. The vessel was commissioned USS Natoma for Section Patrol duties and designated SP-666. Natoma spent the war years patrolling New York harbor and approaches. On 9 April 1919 the boat was transferred to United States Coast and Geodetic Survey surveying on both coasts until 1935.

== Construction ==
Natoma was designed and built as a private motorboat in 1913 for Charles H. Foster, President of the Cadillac Motor Car Company of Chicago, at Morris Heights, New York, by Gas Engine and Power Company and Charles L. Seabury and Sons. The yacht was hull number 2337 and registered with U.S. Official Number 211436. Registry information gives 112 GRT, 76 NRT, 118.9 ft (36.2 m) registry length, 17.1 ft (5.2 m) beam, 8.5 ft (2.6 m) depth, with a crew of four and home port of Chicago. Similar dimensions given are 112 ft (34.1 m) waterline length and 119 ft (36.3 m) length overall in general descriptions.

The steel hulled boat was powered by two 8½ X 10 (Note: The designation is defined in the Navy reference Ships' Data U.S. Naval Vessels (1918). The engines were 6 cylinder with cylinder dimensions of 8.5 in (21.6 cm) and 10 in (25.4 cm) stroke.) Speedway gasoline engines generating a total of 330 horsepower giving a speed of 14 mph (12 kn; 23 km/h) and maximum speed of 16 mph (14 kn; 26 km/h). Speedway engines were a product of the Gas Engine and Power Company, merged with Charles L. Seabury and Sons, and shortly to become Consolidated Shipbuilding.

The aft part had two double staterooms and lobby that could be used as an extra stateroom with wash basins and access to the bathroom with hot and cold water. A center cabin was fitted with comfortable seating, book cases and a desk. The spaces were heated by hot water radiators. A General Electric motor generator furnished electrical power with electric lighting throughout. The main saloon in the forward deck house was furnished in mahogany and black leather with a buffet at the after end.

At some point the boat came under the ownership of Richard Howe who sold it to the Navy for $45,000.

== United States Navy service, 1917-1919 ==
The U.S. Navy purchased Natoma from Richard F. Howe of New York City for $45,000 on 3 July 1917 for World War I service and commissioned her on 23 August 1917 as USS Natoma (SP-666). Natoma was assigned to section patrol duty in the 3rd Naval District during World War I. The patrols were around the New York harbor entrance light ships and keeping restricted areas clear of traffic that would hinder troopship movements. After the Armistice with Germany, she was decommissioned.

== United States Coast and Geodetic Survey service, 1919-1935 ==
The U.S. Navy transferred Natoma to the United States Coast and Geodetic Survey on 9 April 1919. (Note: DANFS has 4 April.) Natoma served as a survey ship along both the United States East Coast and the United States West Coast during her years with the Coast and Geodetic Survey.

Between transfer and 23 May the vessel was being readied for survey work on the Pacific coast. On 23 May USC&GS Natoma left New York reaching Panama by 30 June and arriving at San Francisco 27 July 1919. By 31 July the vessel had begun work surveying the Bonita Channel at the request of the Navy's Pacific Fleet. On completion of this survey the vessel began a survey of San Francisco Bay including revision of the shore line that lasted until 15 April 1920 after which the vessel underwent repairs. On 13 July 1920 Natoma departed San Francisco to undertake surveys of the harbor at Los Angeles that lasted until 14 December 1920. The vessel returned to San Francisco surveying the bay until 26 May 1921 when the vessel underwent repairs and overhaul preparing for the next survey season.

Alterations providing additional accommodations were made during fiscal year 1925 with the vessel then surveying in Alaskan waters. Survey of Kaigani Strait, two harbors on Tlevak Strait and Kruzof Island are noted. Work on the West Coast continued until the spring of 1927 when the vessel was transferred to the East Coast, surveying doubtful areas on the approaches to the Panama Canal. By the fall and winter of 1932 Natoma was surveying the Hudson River after maintenance of the river had led to greater depths to Albany, New York for deeper draft vessels.

The Survey decommissioned Natoma in 1935.
