= Maggy Krell =

American politician

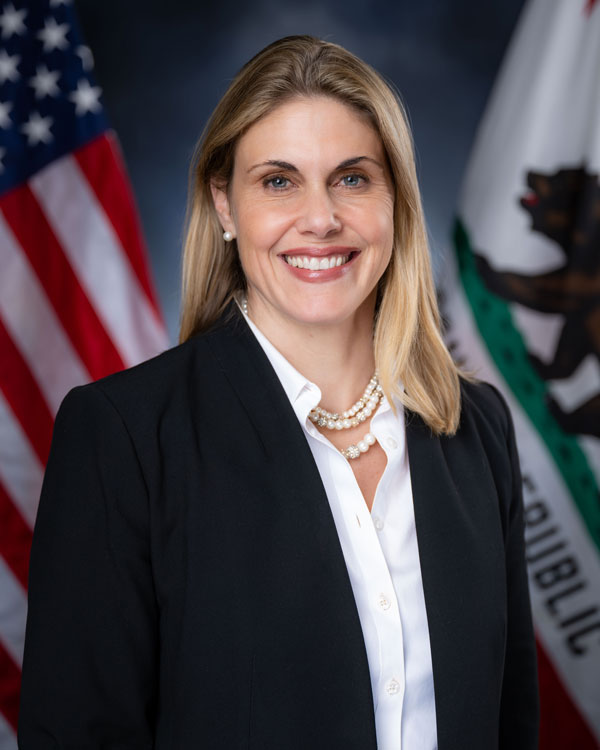
- Official portrait, 2025

Member of the California State Assembly from the 6th district
- Incumbent
- Assumed office December 2, 2024
- Preceded by: Kevin McCarty

Personal details
- Born: 1978 (age 47–48)
- Party: Democratic
- Children: 2
- Education: University of California, San Diego (BA); University of California, Davis (JD)

Maggy Krell is an American lawyer, prosecutor, and politician currently serving in the California State Assembly. She is a Democrat representing the 6th district, encompassing the majority of the city of Sacramento and surrounding unincorporated communities. Before successfully running for the Assembly, Krell served as a Deputy Attorney General and Special Assistant United States Attorney prosecuting high profile cases throughout California. She also served as Chief Legal Counsel for Planned Parenthood California where she led the organization’s national litigation efforts.

== Legal career ==
Krell received her Juris Doctor from the University of California, Davis School of Law in 2003, and started her career as a deputy district attorney for San Joaquin County, in Stockton, California. She subsequently moved to the California Department of Justice where she prosecuted a wide variety of cases, including cold case murders, white collar crime, and multi-jurisdictional cases. She was promoted to Supervising Deputy Attorney General, and led California’s Special Prosecution Unit.

In that role, Krell distinguished herself as both a prosecutor of human traffickers and an advocate for survivors. She led the successful prosecution of executives of Backpage.com, at the time the largest online sex trafficking platform in the world, which resulted in the site being shut down in 2018. Krell described her work against the site in her 2022 book Taking Down Backpage: Fighting the World’s Largest Sex Trafficker: A Prosecutor’s Story. The National Center for Missing and Exploited Children honored Krell with a career achievement award for her work on the Backpage case. As an advocate for survivors, Krell helped secure the early release of a sex-trafficking survivor who had been imprisoned as a teenager for crimes stemming from her victimization. Krell has been outspoken about the need for better treatment of victims by the criminal justice system.

In 2018, Krell joined Planned Parenthood Affiliates of California as their Chief Legal Counsel, seeking to help combat efforts by the Trump Administration to cut funding and curtail access to low-cost reproductive healthcare. In that role, she filed an amicus brief defending a California law that sought to reduce targeted dissemination of misinformation about reproductive healthcare from a suit that was being heard by the Supreme Court. She also defended access to federal family planning funds by seeking an injunction under the federal government’s Title X Rule.

After the Trump Administration began a policy of separating families arrested for crossing the U.S.-Mexico border, Krell served as a volunteer lawyer, helping to reunite separated parents and children, and worked to challenge the federal government’s policy through legal action.

== Political career ==
Krell won election to the California State Assembly in 2024 on a platform promising to prioritize public safety, protect access to reproductive healthcare, address high prices and homelessness, and improve programs benefiting vulnerable youth. She had previously run for Sacramento County District Attorney in 2014 and lost to Anne Marie Schubert. In 2024, Krell won her primary by a more than 10-point margin in a large field that included six other Democrats. She focused her general election campaign on a ballot measure in Nevada to enshrine access to abortion as a right in the state constitution, bussing dozens of volunteers from Sacramento to Reno to campaign. Krell secured 66% of the vote and Nevada’s constitutional initiative also passed. Upon taking office, Krell introduced legislation to protect Californians' access to medication abortion.

== Electoral history ==
2014 Sacramento County District Attorney election
Candidate	Votes	%
Anne Marie Schubert	106,448	58.0
Maggy Krell	59,231	32.3
Todd David Leras	17,404	9.5
Write-in	486	0.3
Total votes	183,569	100.0

2024 California State Assembly 6th district election
Primary election
Party	Candidate	Votes	%
Democratic	Maggy Krell	25,875	25.0
Republican	Nikki Ellis	15,108	14.6
Republican	Preston Romero	14,505	14.0
Democratic	Paula Villescaz	13,780	13.3
Democratic	Carlos Marquez III	9,337	9.0
Democratic	Rosanna Herber	9,257	9.0
Democratic	Sean Frame	6,982	6.8
Democratic	Emmanuel Amanfor	3,920	3.8
Democratic	Evan Minton	2,706	2.6
Peace and Freedom	Kevin Olmar Martinez	1,861	1.8
Total votes		103,335	100.0
General election
Democratic	Maggy Krell	133,581	66.9
Republican	Nikki Ellis	66,217	33.1
Total votes		199,798	100.0
Democratic hold			
