= California's 6th State Assembly district =

American legislative district

Current assemblymember
Maggy Krell; D–Sacramento
- Population: 517,094
- Demographics: 43.1% White; 9.8% Black; 24.2% Latino; 13.9% Asian; 0.5% Native American; 0.9% Hawaiian/Pacific Islander; 0.7% other; 6.9% remainder of multiracial
- Registration: 44.52% Republican; 28.49% Democratic; 21.65% No party preference

California's 6th State Assembly district is one of 80 California State Assembly districts. It is currently represented by Democrat Maggy Krell of Sacramento.

== District profile ==
The district is located entirely within Sacramento County, encompassing the urban core and unincorporated suburbs and rural areas to the north and east.

Sacramento County – 32.7%

- Sacramento (60.45%)
- Arden-Arcade
- Antelope
- Rio Linda
- Elverta

== Election results from statewide races ==
Year	Office	Results
2024	President	Harris 65.1 – 31.1%
2021	Recall	Yes 57.7 – 42.3%
2020	President	Trump 51.5 – 46.1%
2018	Governor	Cox 58.6 – 41.4%
2018	Senator	De Leon 53.2 – 46.8%
2016	President	Trump 52.0 – 41.2%
2016	Senator	Harris 63.6 – 36.4%
2014	Governor	Kashkari 54.3 – 45.7%
2012	President	Romney 59.1 – 38.6%
2012	Senator	Emken 58.9 – 41.1%

== List of assembly members representing the district ==
Due to redistricting, the 6th district has been moved around different parts of the state. The current iteration resulted from the 2021 redistricting by the California Citizens Redistricting Commission.

Assembly members	Party	Years served	Counties represented	Notes
George Wood	Republican	January 5, 1885 – January 3, 1887	Plumas, Sierra	
R. H. F. Variel	Republican	January 3, 1887 – January 7, 1889	Plumas, Sierra	
Henry K. Turner	Republican	January 7, 1889 – January 5, 1891	Plumas, Sierra	
Felix Grundy Hail	Republican	January 5, 1891 – January 2, 1893	Plumas, Sierra	
George Standart	Republican	January 2, 1893 – January 7, 1895	Lassen, Plumas, Sierra	
Ephraim VanBuren Spencer	Republican	January 7, 1895 – January 4, 1897	Lassen, Plumas, Sierra	
Frank D. Soward	Republican	January 4, 1897 – January 2, 1899	Lassen, Plumas, Sierra	
Greenleaf Greeley Clough	Republican	January 2, 1899 – January 5, 1901	Lassen, Plumas, Sierra	
John B. Irish	Republican	January 5, 1901 – January 5, 1903	Lassen, Plumas, Sierra	
Francis M. Weger	Democratic	January 5, 1903 – January 2, 1905	Mendocino	
William D. L. Held	Republican	January 2, 1905 – January 4, 1909	Mendocino	
John W. Preston	Democratic	January 4, 1909 – January 2, 1911	Mendocino	
William D. L. Held	Republican	January 2, 1911 – January 6, 1913	Mendocino	
T. J. Weldon	Democratic	January 6, 1913 – January 4, 1915	Mendocino	
J. A. Pettis	Republican	January 4, 1915 – January 6, 1919	Mendocino	
Charles Kasch	Republican	January 6, 1919 – January 3, 1921	Mendocino	
J. A. Pettis	Republican	January 3, 1921 – January 8, 1923	Mendocino	
Patrick Connolly	Democratic	January 8, 1923 – January 5, 1925	Mendocino	
Charles B. Melville	Republican	January 5, 1925 – January 7, 1929	Mendocino	
R. R. Ingels	Republican	January 7, 1929 – January 5, 1931	Mendocino	
George Milton Biggar	Republican	January 5, 1931 – January 2, 1933	Mendocino, Lake	
Jesse M. Mayo	Republican	January 2, 1933 – January 2, 1939	Alpine, Amador, Calaveras, El Dorado, Inyo, Mariposa, Mono, Nevada, Placer, Tuolumne	
Allan G. Thurman	Democratic	January 2, 1939 – November 4, 1947	Alpine, Amador, Calaveras, El Dorado, Inyo, Mariposa, Mono, Nevada, Placer, Tuolumne	Resigned after winning special election for State Senate 7th district.
Vacant		November 4, 1947 – January 3, 1949	Alpine, Amador, Calaveras, El Dorado, Inyo, Mariposa, Mono, Nevada, Placer, Tuolumne	
Francis C. Lindsay	Republican	January 3, 1949 – January 5, 1959	Alpine, Amador, Calaveras, El Dorado, Inyo, Mariposa, Mono, Nevada, Placer, Tuolumne	
Paul J. Lunardi	Democratic	January 5, 1959 – December 20, 1963	Alpine, Amador, Calaveras, El Dorado, Inyo, Mariposa, Mono, Nevada, Placer, Tuolumne, Yuba	Resigned after winning a special election for State Senate 7th district.
Vacant		December 20, 1963 – January 4, 1965	Alpine, Amador, Calaveras, El Dorado, Inyo, Mariposa, Mono, Nevada, Placer, Tuolumne, Yuba	
Eugene Chappie	Republican	January 4, 1965 – November 30, 1974	Alpine, Amador, Calaveras, El Dorado, Inyo, Mariposa, Mono, Nevada, Placer, Tuolumne, Yuba	
Leroy F. Greene	Democratic	December 2, 1974 – November 30, 1980	Sacramento	
Lloyd Connelly	Democratic	December 6, 1982 – November 30, 1992	Sacramento	
Vivien Bronshvag	Democratic	December 7, 1992 – November 30, 1994	Marin, Sonoma	
Kerry Mazzoni	Democratic	December 5, 1994 – November 30, 2000	Marin, Sonoma	
Joseph Nation	Democratic	December 4, 2000 – November 30, 2006	Marin, Sonoma	
Jared Huffman	Democratic	December 4, 2006 – November 30, 2012	Marin, Sonoma	
Beth Gaines	Republican	December 3, 2012 – November 30, 2016	El Dorado, Placer, Sacramento	
Kevin Kiley	Republican	December 5, 2016 – November 30, 2022	El Dorado, Placer, Sacramento	
Kevin McCarty	Democratic	December 5, 2022 – November 30, 2024	Sacramento	
Maggy Krell	Democratic	December 4, 2024 – present	Sacramento	

== Election results (1990–present) ==
=== 2024 ===
2024 California State Assembly 6th district election
Primary election
Party	Candidate	Votes	%
Democratic	Maggy Krell	25,879	25.0
Republican	Nikki Ellis	15,108	14.6
Republican	Preston Romero	14,505	14.0
Democratic	Paula Villescaz	13,780	13.3
Democratic	Carlos Marquez III	9,337	9.0
Democratic	Rosanna Herber	9,257	9.0
Democratic	Sean Frame	6,982	6.8
Democratic	Emmanuel Amanfor	3,920	3.8
Democratic	Evan Minton	2,706	2.6
Peace and Freedom	Kevin Olmar Martinez	1,861	1.8
Total votes		103,339	100.0
General election
Democratic	Maggy Krell	133,581	66.9
Republican	Nikki Ellis	66,217	33.1
Total votes		199,798	100.0
Democratic hold			

=== 2022 ===
2022 California State Assembly 6th district election
Primary election
Party	Candidate	Votes	%
Democratic	Kevin McCarty (incumbent)	57,740	55.4
Republican	Cathy Cook	21,522	20.6
Democratic	Josh Pane	15,709	15.1
Republican	Bob Marques	7,340	7.0
Libertarian	Janice Marlae Bonser	1,931	1.9
Total votes		104,242	100.0
General election
Democratic	Kevin McCarty (incumbent)	98,656	65.6
Republican	Cathy Cook	51,823	34.4
Total votes		150,479	100.0
Democratic gain from Republican			

=== 2020 ===
2020 California State Assembly 6th district election
Primary election
Party	Candidate	Votes	%
Republican	Kevin Kiley (incumbent)	104,412	58.0
Democratic	Jackie Smith	75,557	42.0
Total votes		179,669	100.0
General election
Republican	Kevin Kiley (incumbent)	178,559	59.0
Democratic	Jackie Smith	124,294	41.0
Total votes		302,853	100.0
Republican hold			

=== 2018 ===
2018 California State Assembly 6th district election
Primary election
Party	Candidate	Votes	%
Republican	Kevin Kiley (incumbent)	80,843	61.3
Democratic	Jackie Smith	50,953	38.7
Total votes		131,796	100.0
General election
Republican	Kevin Kiley (incumbent)	131,284	58.0
Democratic	Jackie Smith	94,984	42.0
Total votes		226,268	100.0
Republican hold			

=== 2016 ===
2016 California State Assembly 6th district election
Primary election
Party	Candidate	Votes	%
Democratic	Brian Caples	26,707	19.8
Republican	Kevin Kiley	22,019	16.3
Republican	Andy Pugno	19,033	14.1
Democratic	John Edward Z'berg	15,884	11.8
Republican	Cristi Nelson	12,834	9.5
Republican	Bill Halldin	12,342	9.2
Republican	Kevin Hanley	8,989	6.7
Republican	Ron "Mik" Mikulaco	8,239	6.1
Republican	Suzanne Jones	4,397	3.3
No party preference	"Bo" Bogdan I. Ambrozewicz	2,634	2.0
Republican	Gabriel L. Hydrick	1,649	1.2
Total votes		134,727	100.0
General election
Republican	Kevin Kiley	149,415	64.6
Democratic	Brian Caples	81,919	35.4
Total votes		231,334	100.0
Republican hold			

=== 2014 ===
2014 California State Assembly 6th district election
Primary election
Party	Candidate	Votes	%
Republican	Beth Gaines (incumbent)	55,167	64.3
Democratic	Brian Caples	30,575	35.7
Total votes		85,742	100.0
General election
Republican	Beth Gaines (incumbent)	94,020	65.7
Democratic	Brian Caples	49,044	34.3
Total votes		143,064	100.0
Republican hold			

=== 2012 ===
2012 California State Assembly 6th district election
Primary election
Party	Candidate	Votes	%
Republican	Beth Gaines (incumbent)	38,827	37.1
Republican	Andy Pugno	33,382	31.9
Democratic	Regy Bronner	32,573	31.1
Total votes		104,782	100.0
General election
Republican	Beth Gaines (incumbent)	128,465	69.2
Republican	Andy Pugno	57,084	30.8
Total votes		185,549	100.0
Republican gain from Democratic			

=== 2010 ===
2010 California State Assembly 6th district election
Party	Candidate	Votes	%
Democratic	Jared Huffman (incumbent)	119,753	70.5
Republican	Robert Louis Stephens	50,218	29.5
Total votes		169,971	100.0
Democratic hold			

=== 2008 ===
2008 California State Assembly 6th district election
Party	Candidate	Votes	%
Democratic	Jared Huffman (incumbent)	145,142	69.5
Republican	Paul Lavery	50,053	24.0
Libertarian	Timothy Hannan	13,790	6.6
Total votes		208,985	100.0
Democratic hold			

=== 2006 ===
2006 California State Assembly 6th district election
Party	Candidate	Votes	%
Democratic	Jared Huffman	106,589	65.8
Republican	Michael Hartnett	43,864	27.1
Green	Cat Woods	6,922	4.3
Libertarian	Richard Olmstead	4,519	2.8
Total votes		161,894	100.0
Democratic hold			

=== 2004 ===
2004 California State Assembly 6th district election
Party	Candidate	Votes	%
Democratic	Joe Nation (incumbent)	148,556	72.5
Republican	Carolyn F. Patrick	56,311	27.5
Total votes		204,867	100.0
Democratic hold			

=== 2002 ===
2002 California State Assembly 6th district election
Party	Candidate	Votes	%
Democratic	Joe Nation (incumbent)	96,157	69.3
Republican	Kenneth Hitt	37,375	26.8
Libertarian	Richard Olmstead	5,423	3.9
Total votes		138,955	100.0
Democratic hold			

=== 2000 ===
2000 California State Assembly 6th district election
Party	Candidate	Votes	%
Democratic	Joe Nation	113,439	64.0
Republican	Edward John Sullivan	48,163	27.2
Independent	Anna Nevenic	10,954	6.1
Libertarian	Richard Olmstead	4,893	2.7
Total votes		177,449	100.0
Democratic hold			

=== 1998 ===
1998 California State Assembly 6th district election
Party	Candidate	Votes	%
Democratic	Kerry Mazzoni (incumbent)	99,887	67.3
Republican	Russ Weiner	45,237	30.5
Peace and Freedom	Coleman C. Persily	3,221	2.2
Total votes		148,345	100.0
Democratic hold			

=== 1996 ===
1996 California State Assembly 6th district election
Party	Candidate	Votes	%
Democratic	Kerry Mazzoni (incumbent)	109,139	64.9
Republican	David Crockett	49,367	29.4
Libertarian	Mary Jane Clifford	5,913	3.5
Peace and Freedom	Coleman C. Persily	3,729	2.2
Total votes		168,148	100.0
Democratic hold			

=== 1994 ===
1994 California State Assembly 6th district election
Party	Candidate	Votes	%
Democratic	Kerry Mazzoni	92,675	61.2
Republican	Brian Sobel	55,008	36.3
Peace and Freedom	Coleman C. Persily	3,672	2.4
Total votes		151,355	100.0
Democratic hold			

=== 1992 ===
1992 California State Assembly 6th district election
Party	Candidate	Votes	%
Democratic	Vivien Bronshvag	100,812	53.3
Republican	Al Aramburu	74,739	39.5
Libertarian	Adam McAfee	9,016	4.8
Peace and Freedom	Coleman C. Persily	4,637	2.5
Total votes		189,204	100.0
Democratic gain from Republican			

=== 1990 ===
1990 California State Assembly 6th district election
Party	Candidate	Votes	%
Democratic	Lloyd Connelly (incumbent)	61,721	57.9
Republican	George Marsh	39,245	36.8
Libertarian	Barbara Engelhardt	5,590	5.2
Total votes		106,556	100.0
Democratic hold			

== See also ==
- California State Assembly
- California State Assembly districts
- Districts in California
