= Natomas Unified School District =

School district in California

Address
- 1901 Arena Boulevard Sacramento, California, 95834; United States

District information
- Grades: K–12
- Superintendent: Robyn Castillo
- NCES District ID: 0600036

Students and staff
- Enrollment: 13,748 (2020–2021)
- Teachers: 624.53 (FTE)
- Staff: 666.99 (FTE)
- Student–teacher ratio: 22.01:1

Other information
- Website: natomasunified.org

Natomas Unified School District is located in northwestern Sacramento, California. It is the main school district of Natomas, a neighborhood of Sacramento. Robyn Castillo is the Superintendent.

NUSD ranks first in California for diversity and is the second-most diverse school district in the entire United States.

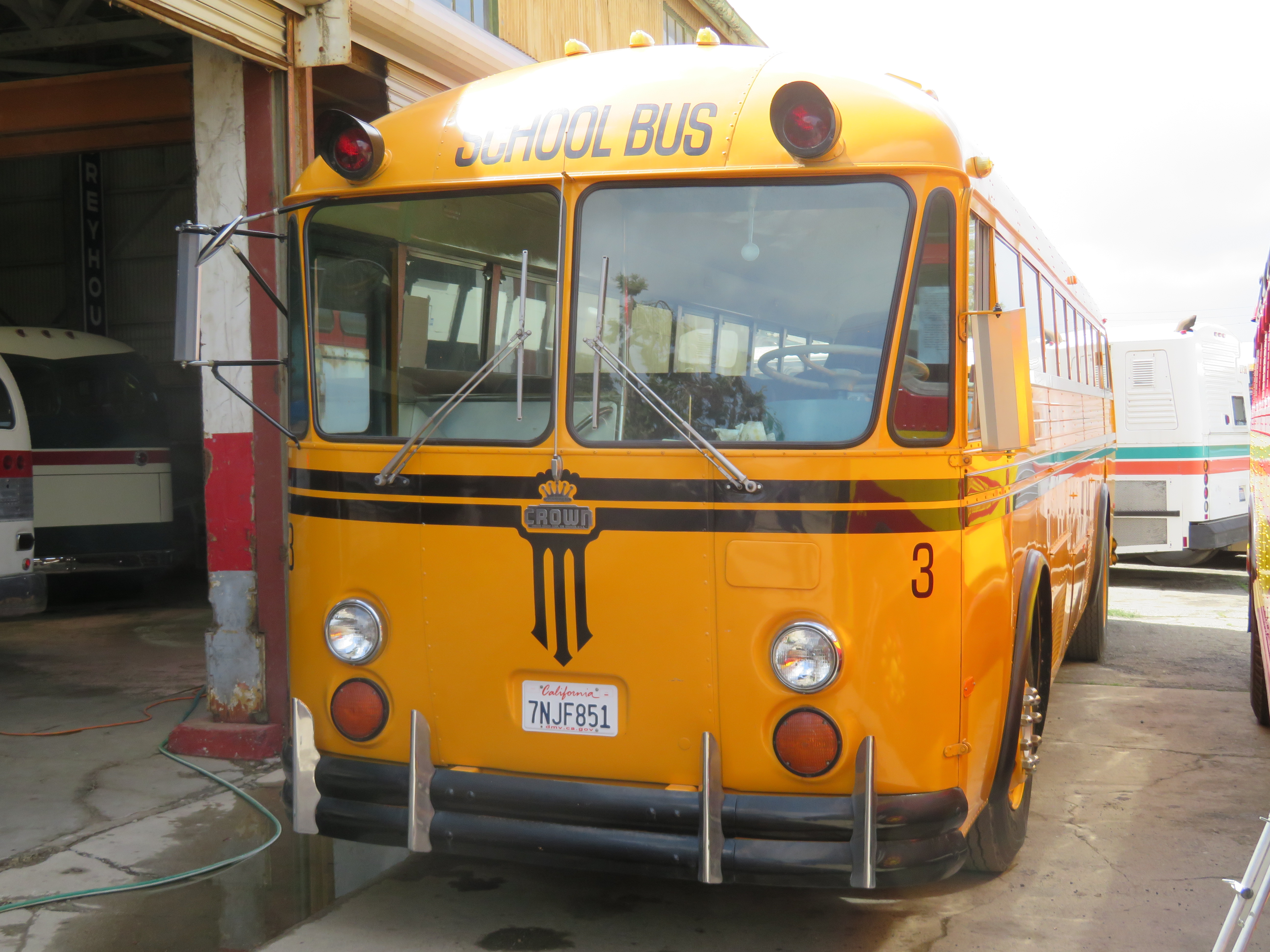
Natomas School District #3, a 1968 Crown Coach, at the Pacific Bus Museum in 2018

== Schools ==
=== High schools ===
- Discovery High School
- Inderkum High School
- Natomas High School

=== Middle schools ===
- Natomas Middle School

=== K-8 schools ===
- American Lakes School
- Bannon Creek School
- Heredia-Arriaga School
- Heron School
- Jefferson School
- Paso Verde School

=== K-5 schools ===
- H. Allen Hight Elementary School
- Natomas Park Elementary School
- Two Rivers Elementary School
- Witter Ranch Elementary School

=== Charter schools ===
- Natomas Charter School (five charter programs: Star Academy, Leading Edge (LE), Performing & Fine Arts Academy (PFAA), Early College Academy (ECA), and Pursuing Academic Choices Together (PACT), a homeschool program. It is a TK-12 school. The school has about 1,600 students.
- Natomas Pacific Pathways Preparatory (a.k.a. NP3)
- Westlake Charter School
- Larry G. Meeks Academy
- Leroy Greene Academy
