= Kevin Freeman =

Kevin Freeman may refer to:

- Kevin Freeman (equestrian) (1941 – 2023), American equestrian
- Kevin Freeman (businessman), American fund manager and author
- Kevin Freeman (basketball) (born 1978), retired American basketball player
