= 2010 California Proposition 23 =

Referendum on environmental regulations

Proposition 23
- November 2, 2010
- Suspend Air Pollution Control Law (AB 32)

Results
Choice	Votes	%
Yes	3,733,883	38.46%
No	5,974,564	61.54%
Total votes	9,708,447	100.00%
County results
For
60–70%
50–60%
Against
80–90%
70–80%
60–70%
50–60%

2010 California Proposition 23 was a California ballot proposition that was on the November 2, 2010 California statewide ballot. It was defeated by California voters during the statewide election by a 23% margin. If passed, it would have suspended AB 32, a law also known as the Global Warming Solutions Act of 2006, which established a comprehensive program to reduce greenhouse gas emissions from all sources throughout the state. Sponsors of the initiative referred to their measure as the California Jobs Initiative while opponents called it the Dirty Energy Prop.

The goal of the proposition was to freeze the provisions of AB 32 until California's unemployment rate dropped to 5.5% or below for four consecutive quarters. Since the rate was then at 12.4%, and it had been decades since the state had seen an unemployment rate below 5.5% for such a period of time, this wording was seen by former Gov. Arnold Schwarzenegger and others as a wording trick to delay the environmental regulations indefinitely. AB 32 requires that greenhouse emission levels in the state be cut to 1990 levels by 2020, in a gradual process of cutting that is slated to begin in 2012. Reducing greenhouse emission levels to 1990 levels will involve cutting them by about 15% from 2010 levels.

AB 32 includes a provision allowing the Governor of California to suspend the provisions of AB 32 if there are "extraordinary circumstances" in place, such as "significant economic harm". The supporters of Prop 23, Assemblyman Dan Logue and Ted Costa, decided to circulate a petition to accomplish a suspension of the environmental regulations. Governor Schwarzenegger, as well as the major party candidates for Governor, Jerry Brown, and Meg Whitman, all stated they would vote "no" on Prop 23. Brown however favored "adjustments" to AB 32, while Whitman would have immediately suspended the law.

Louise Bedsworth, a research fellow at the Public Policy Institute of California, predicted in April 2010 that total campaign spending on this proposition would top the $154 million record set in 2006 by Proposition 87.

If campaign spending on the proposition does reach that level, it could be because supporters and opponents view the battle over the suspension of AB 32 as symbolic in the larger national debate over global warming. Steven Maviglio, speaking for a group that wants to keep AB 32 intact, said, "...this could be a ground zero for the battle for the future of clean energy".

== Details ==
Ballot 09-0094 was cleared for circulation on February 3, 2010. Ballots 09-0104 and 09-0105 were cleared for circulation on February 7. The ballot title given to all three measures is identical. The estimated fiscal impact for all three measures is identical. The summary is slightly different. 09-0094 and 09-0104 both set 5.5% as the level of unemployment beneath which California's unemployment level must drop for four quarters before AB 32 could be re-instated, while 09-0105 sets 4.8% as that unemployment level.

The original ballot label (09-0094) was "Suspends air pollution control laws requiring major polluters to report and reduce greenhouse gas emissions that cause global warming, until unemployment rate drops to 5.5 percent or less for full year".

After a California Appeals Judge ruling on August 3, 2010: the Official Ballot Label became "Suspends implementation of air pollution control law (AB 32) requiring major sources of emissions to report and reduce greenhouse emissions that cause global warming, until unemployment drops to 5.5 percent or less for full year."

The Official summary: "Suspends State law that requires greenhouse gas emissions be reduced to 1990 levels by 2020, until California’s unemployment drops to 5.5 percent or less for four consecutive quarters. Suspends comprehensive greenhouse-gas-reduction program that includes increased renewable energy and cleaner fuel requirements, and mandatory emissions reporting and fee requirements for major emissions sources such as power plants and oil refineries."

The Estimated fiscal impact was: The suspension of AB 32 could result in a modest net increase in overall economic activity in the state. In this event, there would be an unknown but potentially significant net increase in state and local government revenues. Potential loss of a new source of state revenues from the auctioning of emission allowances by state government to certain businesses that would pay for these allowances, by suspending the future implementation of cap-and-trade regulations. Lower energy costs for state and local governments than otherwise.

== Support ==
While Proposition 23 was put forward by a group of individuals, it immediately drew the support of large corporations and eventually became identified with out-of-state oil interests. Assemblyman Dan Logue, who was a key sponsor, said of the proposed initiative: "This has been the blind leading the blind, political correctness that has collapsed the economy in California. California already has the fifth-cleanest air in the country, so why are we doing this when no one else is?"

=== Individual Supporters ===
- Assemblyman Dan Logue was a key sponsor. Logue said of the proposed initiative, "This has been the blind leading the blind, political correctness that has collapsed the economy in California. California already has the fifth-cleanest air in the country, so why are we doing this when no one else is?"
- U.S. Congressman Tom McClintock
- Former Gubernatorial candidate Steve Poizner
- Jim Kellogg, Secretary and Treasurer of the State Building & Construction Trades Council. He said, "I don't doubt that there will be more green jobs in California, perhaps even thousands of them; however, we don't want to put at risk the millions of well-paying, blue-collar jobs that put bread on the table right now. We need to make sure we do our homework, ask the tough questions and make adjustments as necessary to implement AB 32 in a way that reduces greenhouse gases without hurting millions of families in this state".

=== Large corporations ===
- Valero, employer of 1,600 employees and operator of two oil refineries in California, headquartered in San Antonio, Texas
- Tesoro, headquartered in San Antonio, Texas
- Koch Industries, the largest private U.S. chemical company with more than 1,000 employees in California, and considerable holdings in oil, headquartered in Wichita, Kansas.

=== Political parties ===
- California Republican Party
- California Libertarian Party

=== Taxpayer advocate organizations ===
- Howard Jarvis Taxpayers Association

=== Trade organizations ===
- California Manufacturers & Technology Association, a spokesperson said that if AB 32 is implemented as planned, it would be the "death knell for scores of manufacturing jobs".

=== No longer support ===
- Ted Costa of People's Advocate, an initial sponsor, withdrew his active support in March 2010, saying, "Big money interests have come in and shut out the people", referring to his grassroots signature gathering operation. Assemblyman Dan Logue pointed out that People's Advocate was never hired to gather signatures and that Costa is just upset that he didn't get the contract.

=== Donors ===
The Sacramento Bee reported on March 4 that two Texas-based oil companies, Valero Energy Corporation and Tesoro Corporation, provided the campaign with initial funding to launch its petition drive to qualify for the November 2 ballot.

According to Cal-Access figures, as of October 19, donations totalling $9.1 million had been made to the "California Jobs Initiative Committee":

Donor	Amount
Valero	$4,050,000
Tesoro	$1,525,000
Flint Hills Resources LP (subsidiary of Koch Industries)	$1,000,000
Adam Smith Foundation	$498,000
Occidental Petroleum	$300,000
National Petrochemical and Refiners Association	$100,000
Tower Energy Group gasoline retailer	$200,000
World Oil Corp	$100,000
Howard Jarvis Taxpayers Association	$100,000
Southern Counties Oil (Total Energy Products)	$50,000
California Trucking Association	$50,000
Frontier Oil	$50,000
Murray Energy	$30,000
Berry Petrochemical	$25,000
Boyett Petroleum (Stan Boylett & Son)	$25,000
California State Pipes Trade Association	$25,000
Caminol Management	$25,000
Holly Corporation	$25,000
Robinson Oil	$25,000

According to the LA Times, the Adam Smith Foundation is a non-profit based in Jefferson city, Missouri. Its mission statement says, "The Adam Smith Foundation was created to defend judicial reform, government accountability, education reform, tax and spending reform and protecting private property".

=== Consultants ===
Goddard Clausen Strategic Advocacy has been retained as a campaign consultant. Spokesman Jennifer Dudikoff of Goddard Clausen said in early March, "Right now, we're not commenting on funders. We expect support from a very broad group of individuals, companies and associations who are currently concerned with keeping and creating jobs in California".

== Opposition ==
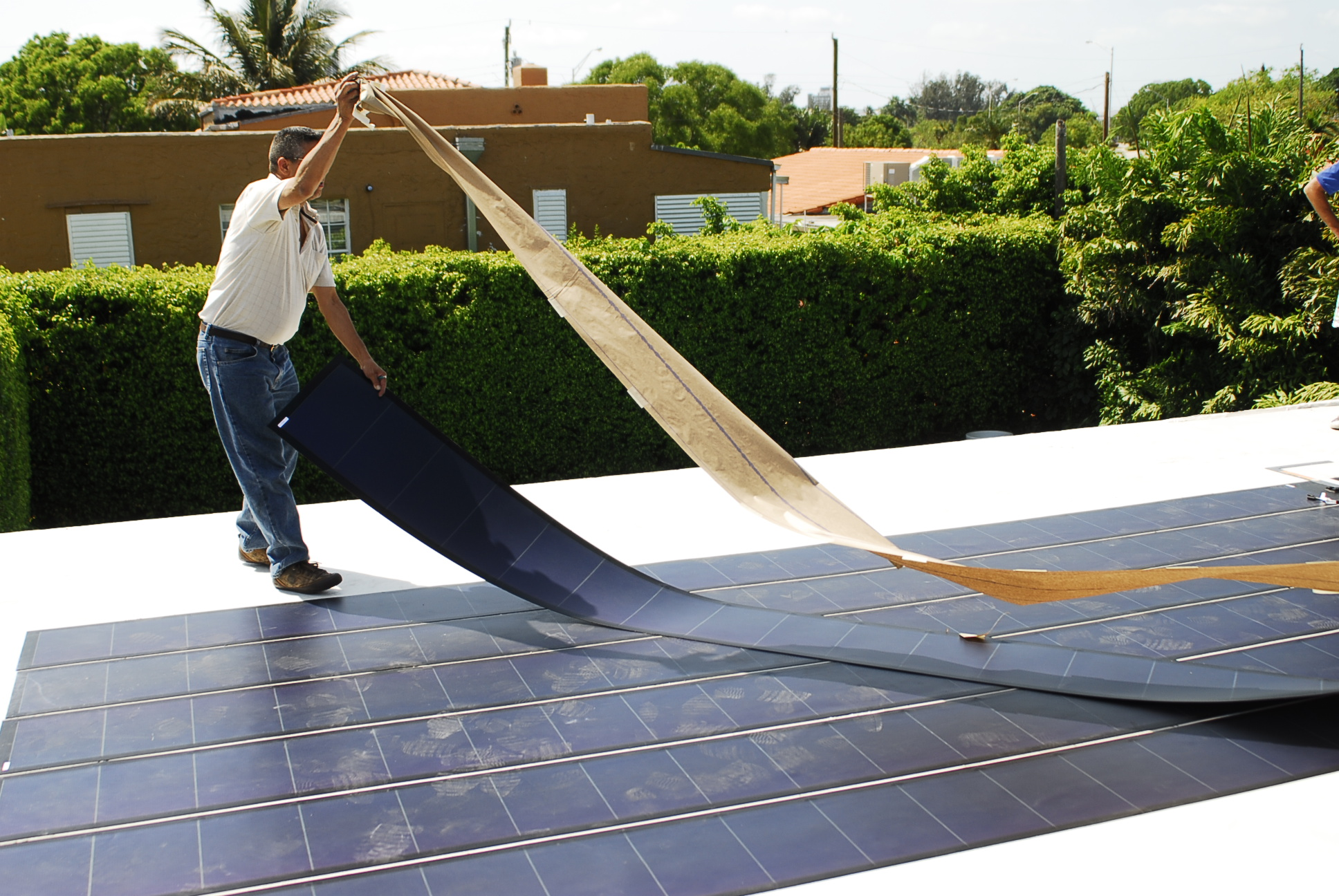
Opponents warned that Prop 23 could have cost California as many as 500,000 clean energy jobs, just as energy companies were ramping up to comply with current law.

A group called "Californians for Clean Energy and Jobs" had formed to oppose the measure. It was part of the coalition of politicians, consumer organizations, health professionals, environmental organizations, and health advocates. George Shultz, who had served as secretary of state during the Reagan administration, was the honorary co-chairman of the group. He said in early May, "While some companies in California have said they’re worried about the cost of the planned greenhouse gas limits, the new regulations will boost the state’s economy by creating 'clean-tech jobs'".

Governor Schwarzenegger criticized the proposition's proponents saying that their interest was to "protect their profits", rather than to protect jobs for Californians as claimed.

=== Opponents ===
==== Politicians ====
- Barbara Boxer, California
- Jerry Brown, Democratic candidate for governor
- Dianne Feinstein, California
- Meg Whitman, Republican candidate for governor
- Arnold Schwarzenegger is staunchly opposed to the proposition. Schwarzenegger says that AB 32 will create green jobs in the state.

==== Consumer organizations ====
- AARP
- Consumer Action
- Consumers Union
- Consumer Federation of California

==== Environmental organizations ====
- Clean Water Action
- Friends of the Earth
- League of Conservation Voters
- National Audubon Society
- National Wildlife Federation, based in Reston, Virginia
- Natural Resources Defense Council, based in New York City
- The Nature Conservancy
- Sierra Club

==== Health organizations ====
- American Lung Association, California
- American Medical Association, Los Angeles, Riverside
- Blue Shield of California

==== Large corporations ====
- eBay
- Nike
- TechNet - includes Apple, Google, and Yahoo
- Virgin America
- Warner Brothers

==== Political organizations ====
- League of Women Voters, California, Los Angeles

==== Public utilities ====
- Pacific Gas & Electric

==== Scientific organizations ====
- Union of Concerned Scientists

==== Trade and labor organizations ====
- California Conference of Carpenters
- California Labor Federation
- California Nurses Association
- Public Health Institute
- California Professional Firefighters
- California Teachers Association
- California Statewide Law Enforcement Association
- California Teamsters
- United Steelworkers
- Western States Council of Sheet Metal Workers

=== Donors ===
The No On 23 - Californians To Stop The Dirty Energy Proposition Committee has received $31,504,863. Donors of at least $1,000,000:

Donor	Amount
Thomas Steyer; Hedge Fund Manager, Farallon Capital Management	$10,000,000
Natural Resources Defense Council	$3,072,500
National Wildlife Federation	$3,000,000
Ann Doerr, wife of John Doerr	$2,000,000
L. John Doerr, venture capitalist at Kleiner Perkins Caufield & Byers	$2,000,000
Vinod Khosla, venture capitalist and co-founder of Sun Microsystems	$1,037,267
Robert J. Fisher	$1,000,000
James Cameron	$1,000,000
Environmental Defense Action Fund	$1,000,000
Gordon Moore	$1,000,000

=== No on 23 Publicity ===
On October 28 at 3pm PST, James Cameron and California Governor Arnold Schwarzenegger unveiled a viral political commercial during a live webcast titled A Message from James Cameron: Vote NO on 23. The commercial was a collaborative effort between Cameron and Schwarzenegger and was directed by Australian director A.J. Carter. The viral spot which runs for 1 minute 10 seconds, motioned for a 'No on 23' vote and received more than 50,000 web hits on YouTube alone in the 72 hours leading up to the ballot deadline.

=== Tactics ===
The Courage Campaign and CREDO Action had called for a boycott of Valero and Beacon gas stations in order to punish Valero for providing financial sponsorship of the initiative. Michael Kieschnick, the president of CREDO Action, said, "What is particularly troubling is that anyone who buys gasoline from Valero is now helping to fund audacious attacks on California's air quality standards. Valero believes it will be cheaper to deceive California voters than to compete in the new energy economy". The communications director of the campaign, Anita Mangels responded, "We are not about stopping carbon reduction... We are about doing it in a responsible manner that won't destroy jobs and cost billions of dollars at the worst possible time".

== Impact on gubernatorial election ==
Prop 23 is a factor in California's 2010 gubernatorial election. This is because the next Governor of California, by the terms of AB 32, has the power to suspend AB 32 regardless of whether the initiative passes.

- Meg Whitman has said she will vote "No" on Prop 23 but may suspend AB 32 for a year to prevent job losses
- Jerry Brown has also said he will vote "No" on Prop 23. He says he would support "adjusting" some features of AB 32 since neighboring states lack strict global warming regulations and regionally AB 32 sets up California at a competitive disadvantage. He generally supports AB 32 and would not suspend it.

== Path to the ballot ==
Polls leading to the ballot initiative revealed that voters who had awareness of Proposition 23 were almost evenly split with 44 percent favoring it, while 45 percent were against it. This was attributed to economic recession happening during the period. There are 433,971 valid signatures required to qualify the measure for the November 2, 2010 ballot.

The petition drive to qualify the measure for the ballot was launched the first week of March. Organizers turned in their qualifying signatures on Monday, May 3. In e-mails to the press on May 3, the campaign said that it had turned in over 800,000 signatures.

On November 25, 2009, the group People's Advocate filed a request with the Office of the California Attorney General for an official ballot title on 09-0094. An official summary was accordingly provided on February 3, 2010. To qualify 09-0094 for the November 2, 2010 ballot, supporters had to provide qualifying signatures to California's 58 county election clerks no later than July 5.

On December 22, requests for ballot titles were filed on 09-0104 and 09-0105. These ballot titles were provided on February 7, with petition deadlines of July 19.

On July 29 the Howard Jarvis Taxpayers Association sued Attorney General Jerry Brown claiming that the ballot description was deceptive. Judge Timothy Frawley agreed that the wording was misleading and ordered Brown to change the wording.

== Result ==
Proposition 23
Choice	Votes	%
For	3,733,883	38.46
Against	5,974,564	61.54
Total	9,708,447	100.00
Source: California Secretary of State
