= National Federation of Republican Assemblies =

American organization

- Abbreviation: NFRA
- Formation: 1935 (California); 1996 (National)
- Legal status: 527 organization
- President: Alex Johnson, 2021–present
- Website: republicanassemblies.org

The National Federation of Republican Assemblies (NFRA) is a political organization which promotes conservative principles and candidates within the Republican Party of the United States. Members at the local, state and national levels work to recruit and elect Republican candidates who reflect the Party's conservative philosophy, and to oppose so-called "RINOs" (Republicans In Name Only), leaders and candidates who take positions to the left of the party's conservative mainstream.

== History ==
The first Republican Assembly was founded in 1934 in California. The Republican Assembly movement grew primarily in the western part of the United States until, in 1996, the several state Republican Assemblies formalized their relationship to one another through the creation of the NFRA, which was also tasked with the establishment of state chapters in those parts of the country to which the movement had not yet spread.

In 2012, the NFRA's Presidential Preference Convention endorsed Rick Santorum for president on the fifth ballot. In 2016, it endorsed Senator Ted Cruz. In 2020 and 2024, the NFRA endorsed Donald Trump.

Prior to the 2024 United States presidential election, the NFRA adopted a resolution as part of its platform claiming that Vice President Kamala Harris was not a natural born citizen and was thus ineligible to serve as president. In support of this claim, the NFRA cited the 1857 Supreme Court decision in Dred Scott v. Sandford, which stated that people of black African descent could not be U.S. citizens.

The organization also adopted a "right of return" policy goal that would encourage and subsidize "the voluntary emigration for any citizen of the U.S. who wishes to emigrate to their country of origin/ancestry provided that their ancestors were brought to this country against their will". The policy, which drew comparisons to the attempted ethnic removal of African-Americans by the American Colonization Society, was criticized.

== National governance ==
The NFRA is governed by a board of directors composed of its officers and three national directors from each state, one of which is the state's president. Unlike the Republican National Committee, there is no gender requirement for any office. National officers are elected for two year terms at the organization's bi-annual convention.

Former Nevada Republican U.S. Senate nominee Sharron Angle was elected president on September 15, 2013. Former Ohio Secretary of State and Republican nominee in the 2006 Ohio gubernatorial election Ken Blackwell was elected executive vice president in 2011 and was re-elected in 2013. In 2016, Angle resigned to run again for United States Senate, and was succeeded as president by Willes Lee, former chairman of the Republican Party of Hawaii. Lee is a West Point graduate, former Army Ranger, and a founder of the Republican National Committee's Conservative Caucus. In 2021, Willes Lee was succeeded as President by the election of attorney Alex Johnson, former President of the Georgia Republican Assembly.

== Advisory board ==
Members of the advisory board include Fox News contributor and former Ronald Reagan and George H. W. Bush policy director Jim Pinkerton, U.S. Senator Ted Cruz's father and advisor Rafael Cruz, Conservatives of Faith founder Bob Fischer, former Crisis magazine publisher and senior George W. Bush advisor Deal Hudson, former appeals court justice and leader of the Conservative Resurgence in the Southern Baptist Convention Paul Pressler, National Religious Broadcasters president Jerry Johnson, fund manager Kevin Freeman, former Republican Study Committee executive director Paul Teller and former U.S. Congressman Ernest Istook.
