= Roger Sharpe =

American politician

Roger Dean Sharpe
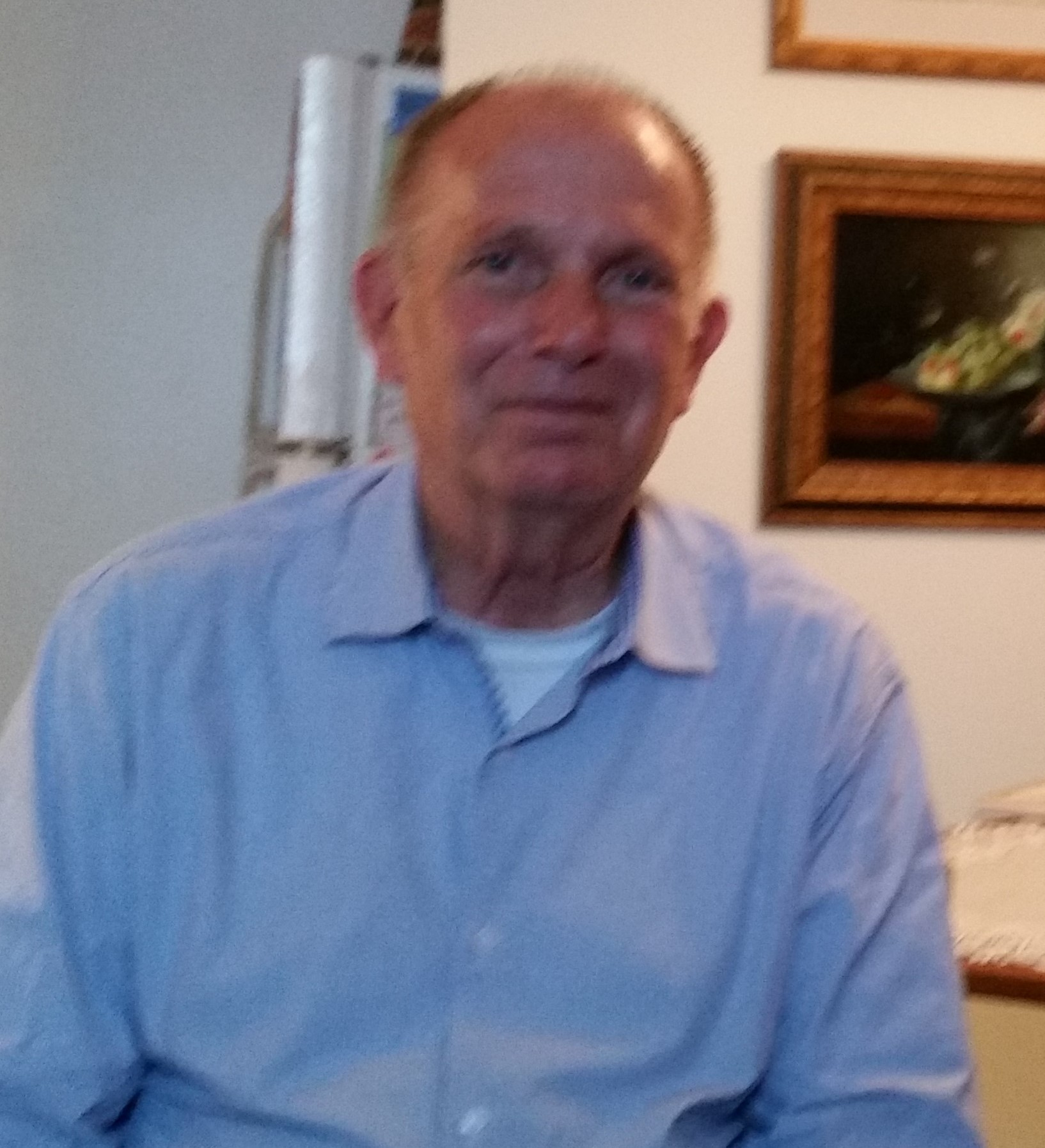
- Sharpe in 2018

Member of the North Carolina Senate from the 24th district
- In office 1977–1978
- Preceded by: James Wade Walsh
- Succeeded by: James Harrell Edwards

Personal details
- Born: 1947 (age 78–79) Harmony, North Carolina
- Party: Democratic
- Spouse: none
- Parent(s): Henry Woodrow Sharpe, Hattie Bell (Shore) Sharpe
- Education: East Carolina University, Harvard University, Union Theological Seminary
- Occupation: public servant
- Profession: author, professor, politician, political historian, U.S. Capital guide

Roger Dean Sharpe is a public servant, author and North Carolina politician. He was the Democratic nominee for the U.S. House of Representatives from the state's Fifth congressional district in 2006, losing to incumbent Virginia Foxx. He was elected to the North Carolina Senate in 1976, at age 29.

== Early life ==
Roger Dean Sharpe was born in 1947 in Harmony, Iredell County, North Carolina. He is the son of Henry Woodrow Sharpe and Hattie Bell (Shore) Sharpe. He attended North Carolina State University and Appalachian State University and holds five earned degrees: ones awarded by East Carolina University (bachelor's degree in Criminal Justice), the John F. Kennedy School of Government at Harvard University (Master's in Public Administration and Ed.D.), the Harvard Graduate School of Education, and a master's in divinity from Union Theological Seminary.

== Career ==
In 1976 Roger was criminal justice faculty at Western Piedmont Community College in Morganton, Burke County, North Carolina when he decided to run for the North Carolina Senate. He was one of two senators elected from the 24th District (includes Avery, Burke, Caldwell, Mitchell, Watauga, and Wilkes counties) to the North Carolina Senate. The other senator, Donald Rayvaugh Kincaid was from Caldwell County. Roger was, at the time, the youngest (age 29) senator elected to serve in the senate. The first session of this General Assembly met from January 12 to July 1, 1977. The second session met from May 31 to June 16, 1978. Roger did not run for re-election and instead chose to continue his education while working.

In 1978–1979, Roger worked for the U.S. Office for Civil Rights in Washington, D.C. He later taught at East Carolina University before working for the National School Boards Association, representing its interests before Congress and the White House.

In the U.S. House of Representatives election of 2006 for the 5th Congressional District, the Democrats' top choice, popular Winston-Salem mayor Allen Joines, decided not to run. Joines later said that he didn't have the stomach for the kind of race he felt it would take to defeat the incumbent, Virginia Foxx. Instead, the Democratic party chose Roger Sharpe to run. Foxx defeated Sharpe – 96,138 to 72,061 votes. Sharpe ran against her record of lack of support for Hurricane Katrina victims and military veterans, as well as his vision for greater support for education and social and economic justice for the 5th District constituents.

He is the author of Ceremony of Innocence, a memoir of his life. He was executive producer of a PBS documentary, The Boy Who Heard Lincoln at Gettysburg, which commemorates the 150th Year of the Gettysburg Address.

He was on the U.S. Capital staff and gave tours of the United States Capitol until 2013. He retired to Asheville, North Carolina.
