= 2006 United States House of Representatives elections in North Carolina =

- November 7, 2006

All 13 North Carolina seats in the United States House of Representatives
| | Majority party | Minority party |
|---|---|---|
| Party | Democratic | Republican |
| Last election | 6 | 7 |
| Seats won | 7 | 6 |
| Seat change | ▲1 | ▼1 |
| Popular vote | 1,026,915 | 913,893 |
| Percentage | 52.91% | 47.09% |
| Swing | ▲3.98% | ▼3.98% |

Democratic
50–60%
60–70%
70–80%
80–90%
90–100%
Republican
50–60%
60–70%
70–80%

The United States House of Representative elections of 2006 in North Carolina were held on 7 November 2006 as part of the biennial election to the United States House of Representatives. All thirteen seats in North Carolina, and 435 nationwide, were elected.

The Democrats gained a seat, becoming the largest party in terms of both representatives and popular vote. All incumbents ran again, with twelve of the thirteen winning re-election. Republican incumbent Charles H. Taylor lost the 11th district, while fellow Republican Robin Hayes came close to losing in the 8th.

== Summary ==
2006 United States House of Representative elections in North Carolina – Summary
| Party | Seats | Gains | Losses | Net gain/loss | Seats % | Votes % | Votes | +/− |
|---|---|---|---|---|---|---|---|---|
| Democratic | 7 | 1 | 0 | +1 | 53.85 | 52.91 | 1,026,915 | +3.98 |
| Republican | 6 | 0 | 1 | –1 | 46.15 | 47.09 | 913,893 | –3.98 |

== District 1 ==
2006 North Carolina's 1st congressional district election
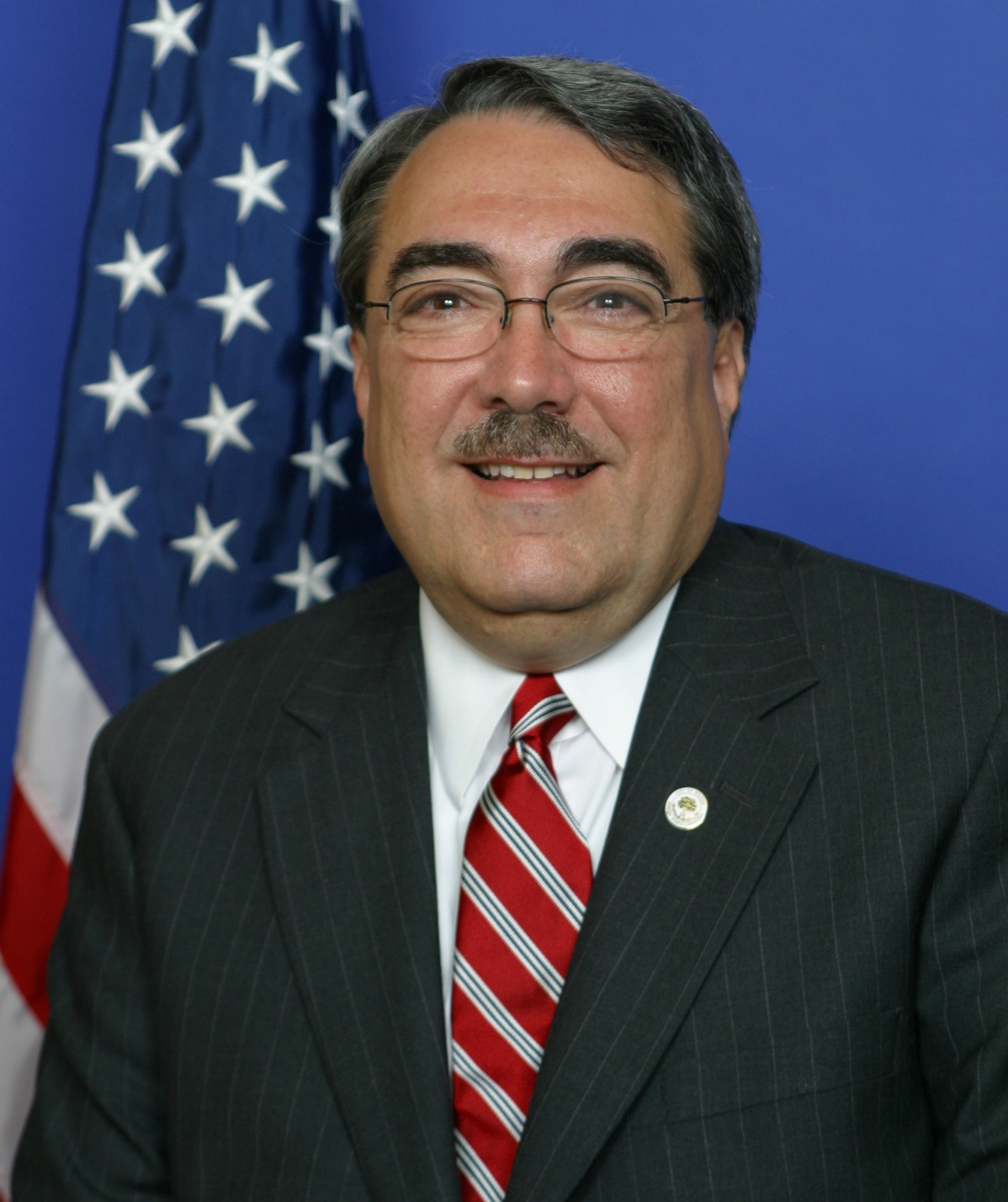
| Nominee | G. K. Butterfield |
| Party | Democratic |
| Popular vote | 82,510 |
| Percentage | 100.0% |
U.S. Representative before election
G. K. Butterfield
Democratic
Elected U.S. Representative
G. K. Butterfield
Democratic

=== Predictions ===
| Source | Ranking | As of |
|---|---|---|
| The Cook Political Report | Safe D | November 6, 2006 |
| Rothenberg | Safe D | November 6, 2006 |
| Sabato's Crystal Ball | Safe D | November 6, 2006 |
| Real Clear Politics | Safe D | November 7, 2006 |
| CQ Politics | Safe D | November 7, 2006 |

2006 United States House of Representatives North Carolina 1st District election
| Party | Candidate | Votes | % | ±% |
|---|---|---|---|---|
| Democratic | G. K. Butterfield (incumbent) | 82,510 | 100.00 | +36.26 |
| Turnout | | 82,510 | | |

== District 2 ==
2006 North Carolina's 2nd congressional district election
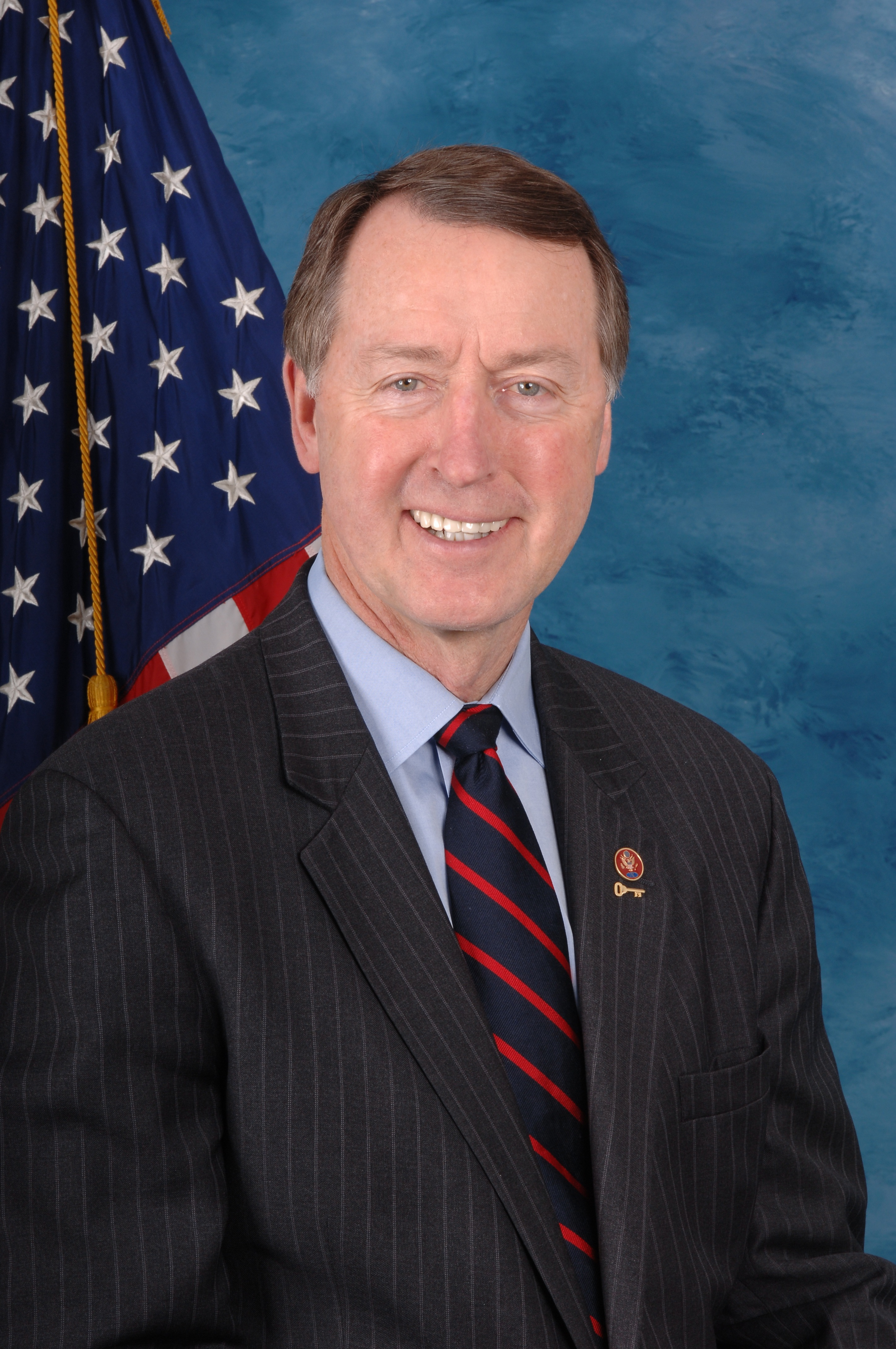

| Nominee | Bob Etheridge | Dan Mansell |
| Party | Democratic | Republican |
| Popular vote | 85,993 | 43,271 |
| Percentage | 66.5% | 33.5% |
- County results Etheridge: 50–60% 60–70% 70–80%
U.S. Representative before election
Bob Etheridge
Democratic
Elected U.S. Representative
Bob Etheridge
Democratic

=== Predictions ===
| Source | Ranking | As of |
|---|---|---|
| The Cook Political Report | Safe D | November 6, 2006 |
| Rothenberg | Safe D | November 6, 2006 |
| Sabato's Crystal Ball | Safe D | November 6, 2006 |
| Real Clear Politics | Safe D | November 7, 2006 |
| CQ Politics | Safe D | November 7, 2006 |

2006 United States House of Representatives North Carolina 2nd District election
| Party | Candidate | Votes | % | ±% |
|---|---|---|---|---|
| Democratic | Bob Etheridge (incumbent) | 85,993 | 66.53 | +4.23 |
| Republican | Dan Mansell | 43,271 | 33.47 | –4.23 |
| Turnout | | 129,264 | | |

== District 3 ==
2006 North Carolina's 3rd congressional district election
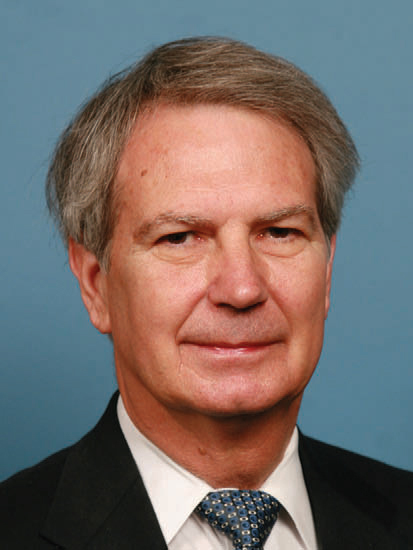

| Nominee | Walter B. Jones Jr. | Craig Weber |
| Party | Republican | Democratic |
| Popular vote | 99,519 | 45,458 |
| Percentage | 68.6% | 31.4% |
- County results Jones: 50–60% 60–70% 70–80%
U.S. Representative before election
Walter B. Jones Jr.
Republican
Elected U.S. Representative
Walter B. Jones Jr.
Republican

=== Predictions ===
| Source | Ranking | As of |
|---|---|---|
| The Cook Political Report | Safe R | November 6, 2006 |
| Rothenberg | Safe R | November 6, 2006 |
| Sabato's Crystal Ball | Safe R | November 6, 2006 |
| Real Clear Politics | Safe R | November 7, 2006 |
| CQ Politics | Safe R | November 7, 2006 |

2006 United States House of Representatives North Carolina 3rd District election
| Party | Candidate | Votes | % | ±% |
|---|---|---|---|---|
| Republican | Walter B. Jones Jr. (incumbent) | 99,519 | 68.64 | –2.05 |
| Democratic | Craig Weber | 45,458 | 31.36 | +2.05 |
| Turnout | | 144,977 | | |

== District 4 ==
2006 North Carolina's 4th congressional district election
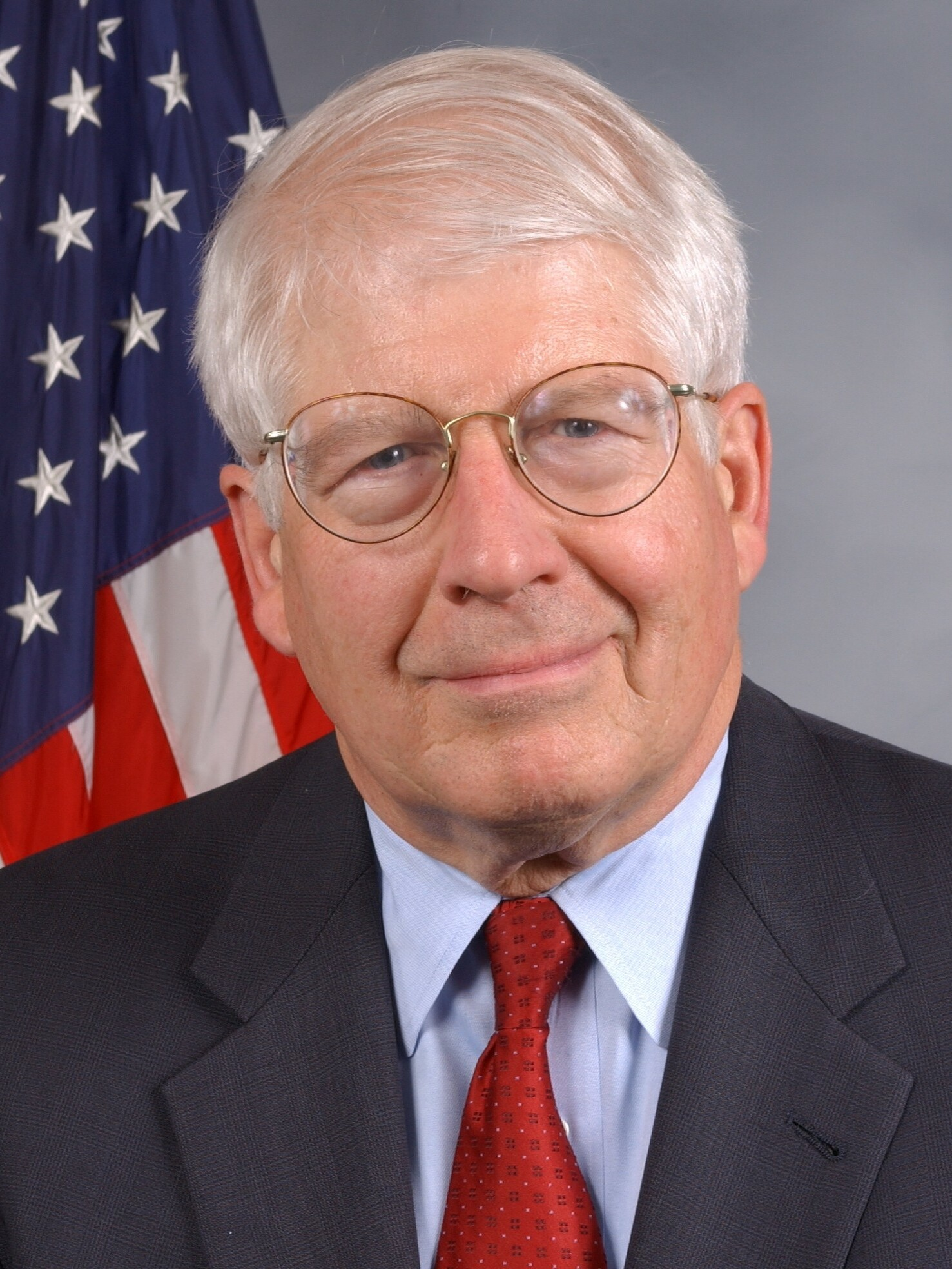

| Nominee | David Price | Steve Acuff |
| Party | Democratic | Republican |
| Popular vote | 127,340 | 68,599 |
| Percentage | 65.0% | 35.0% |
- County results Price: 50–60% 60–70% 70–80%
U.S. Representative before election
David Price
Democratic
Elected U.S. Representative
David Price
Democratic

=== Predictions ===
| Source | Ranking | As of |
|---|---|---|
| The Cook Political Report | Safe D | November 6, 2006 |
| Rothenberg | Safe D | November 6, 2006 |
| Sabato's Crystal Ball | Safe D | November 6, 2006 |
| Real Clear Politics | Safe D | November 7, 2006 |
| CQ Politics | Safe D | November 7, 2006 |

2006 United States House of Representatives North Carolina 4th District election
| Party | Candidate | Votes | % | ±% |
|---|---|---|---|---|
| Democratic | David Price (incumbent) | 127,340 | 64.96 | +0.89 |
| Republican | Steve Acuff | 68,599 | 35.00 | –0.87 |
| Turnout | | 196,015 | | |

== District 5 ==
2006 North Carolina's 5th congressional district election
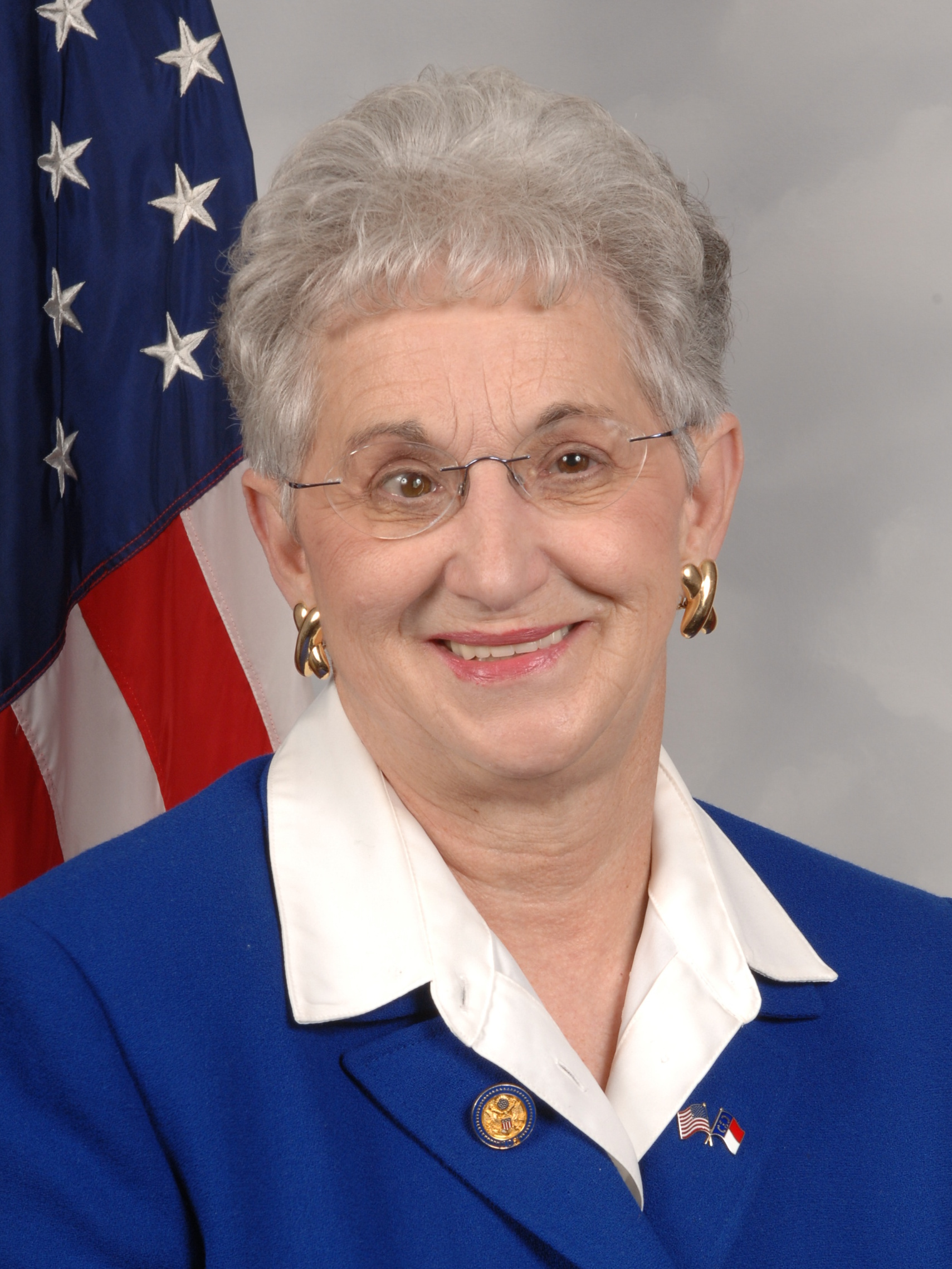

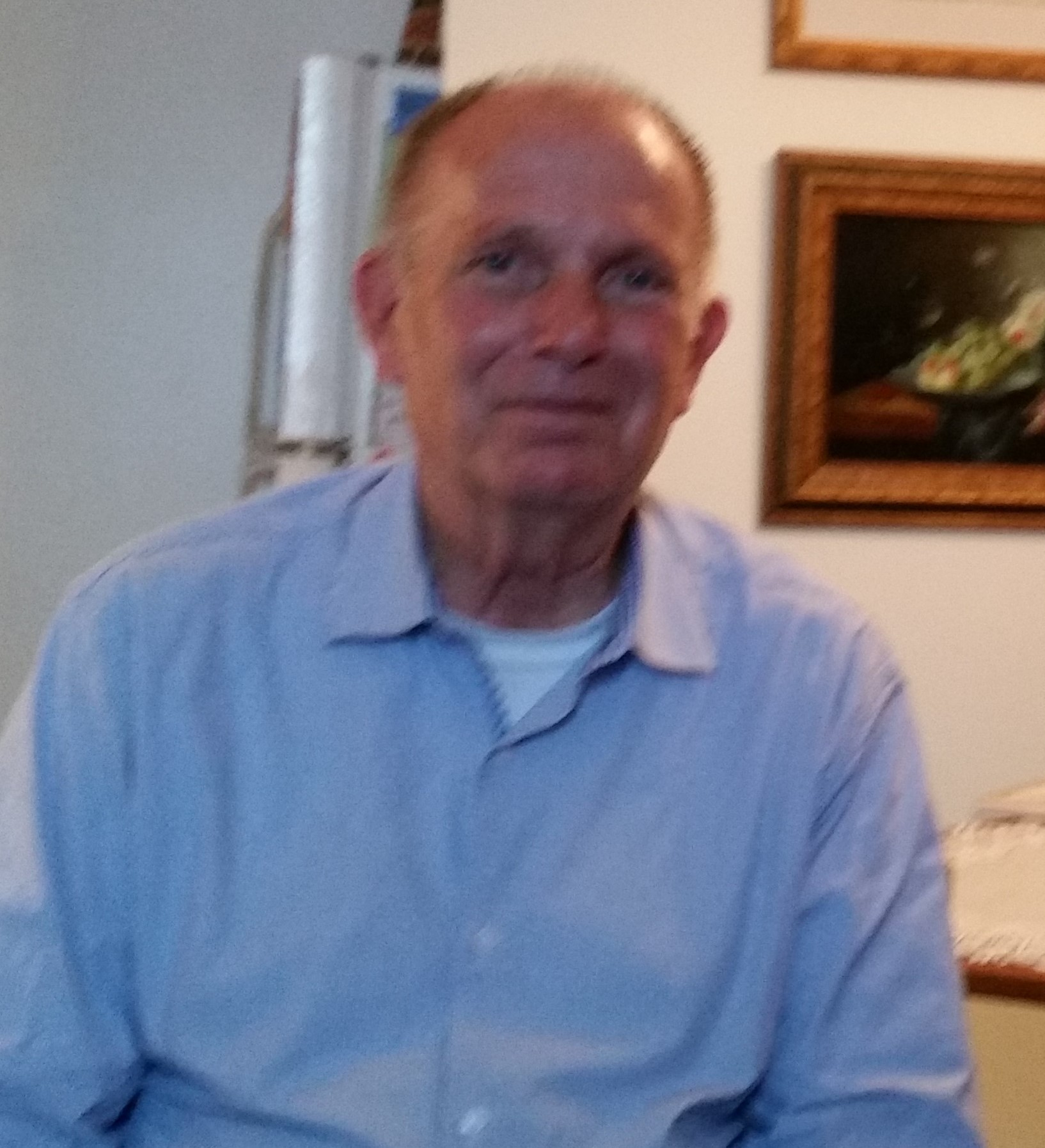
| Nominee | Virginia Foxx | Roger Sharpe |
| Party | Republican | Democratic |
| Popular vote | 96,138 | 72,061 |
| Percentage | 57.2% | 42.8% |
- County results Foxx: 50–60% 60–70% Sharpe: 50–60%
U.S. Representative before election
Virginia Foxx
Republican
Elected U.S. Representative
Virginia Foxx
Republican

=== Predictions ===
| Source | Ranking | As of |
|---|---|---|
| The Cook Political Report | Safe R | November 6, 2006 |
| Rothenberg | Safe R | November 6, 2006 |
| Sabato's Crystal Ball | Safe R | November 6, 2006 |
| Real Clear Politics | Safe R | November 7, 2006 |
| CQ Politics | Safe R | November 7, 2006 |

2006 United States House of Representatives North Carolina 5th District election
| Party | Candidate | Votes | % | ±% |
|---|---|---|---|---|
| Republican | Virginia Foxx (incumbent) | 96,138 | 57.16 | –1.67 |
| Democratic | Roger Sharpe | 72,061 | 42.84 | +1.67 |
| Turnout | | 168,199 | | |

== District 6 ==
2006 North Carolina's 6th congressional district election
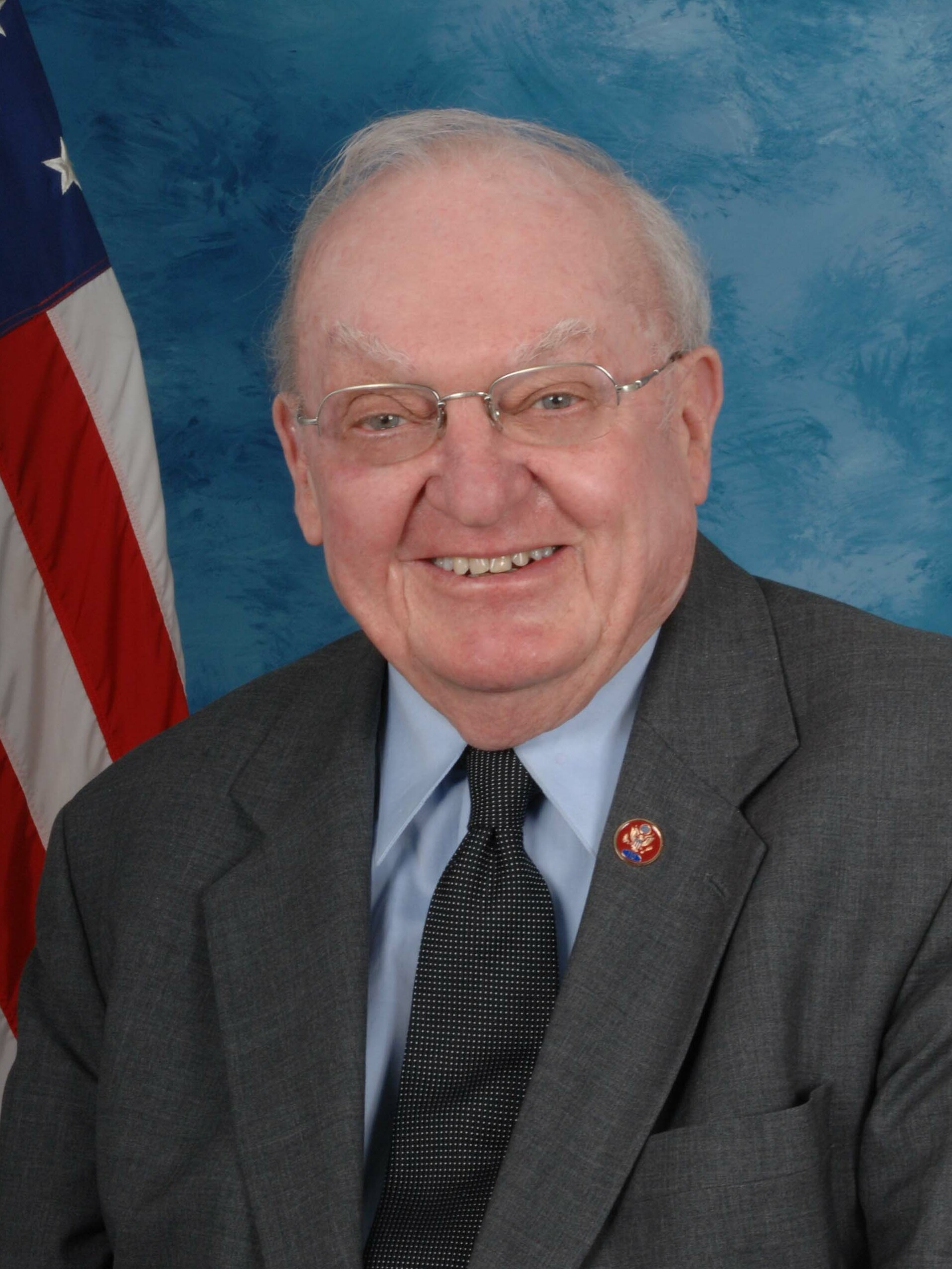

| Nominee | Howard Coble | Rory Blake |
| Party | Republican | Democratic |
| Popular vote | 108,433 | 44,661 |
| Percentage | 70.8% | 29.2% |
- County results Coble: 60–70% 70–80%
U.S. Representative before election
Howard Coble
Republican
Elected U.S. Representative
Howard Coble
Republican

=== Predictions ===
| Source | Ranking | As of |
|---|---|---|
| The Cook Political Report | Safe R | November 6, 2006 |
| Rothenberg | Safe R | November 6, 2006 |
| Sabato's Crystal Ball | Safe R | November 6, 2006 |
| Real Clear Politics | Safe R | November 7, 2006 |
| CQ Politics | Safe R | November 7, 2006 |

2006 United States House of Representatives North Carolina 6th District election
| Party | Candidate | Votes | % | ±% |
|---|---|---|---|---|
| Republican | Howard Coble (incumbent) | 108,433 | 70.83 | –2.32 |
| Democratic | Rory Blake | 44,661 | 29.17 | +2.32 |
| Turnout | | 153,094 | | |

== District 7 ==
2006 North Carolina's 7th congressional district election
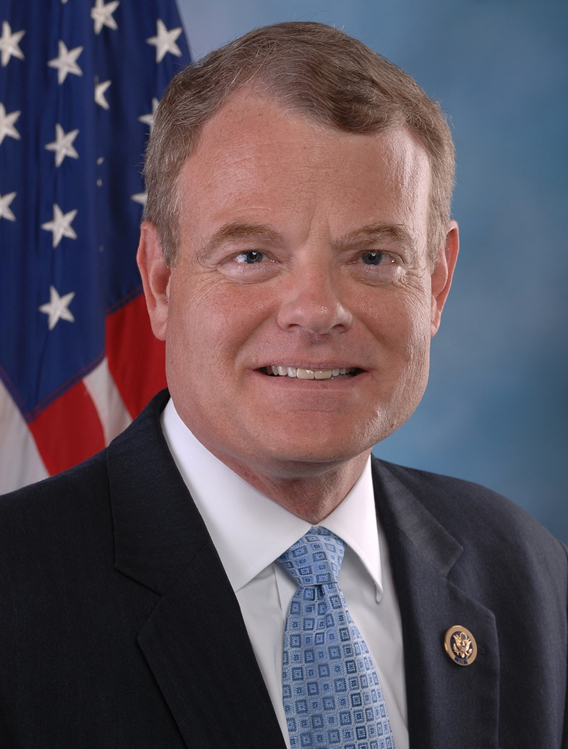

| Nominee | Mike McIntyre | Shirley Davis |
| Party | Democratic | Republican |
| Popular vote | 101,787 | 38,033 |
| Percentage | 72.8% | 27.2% |
- County results Mcintyre: 60–70% 70–80% 80–90% Davis: 50–60%
U.S. Representative before election
Mike McIntyre
Democratic
Elected U.S. Representative
Mike McIntyre
Democratic

=== Predictions ===
| Source | Ranking | As of |
|---|---|---|
| The Cook Political Report | Safe D | November 6, 2006 |
| Rothenberg | Safe D | November 6, 2006 |
| Sabato's Crystal Ball | Safe D | November 6, 2006 |
| Real Clear Politics | Safe D | November 7, 2006 |
| CQ Politics | Safe D | November 7, 2006 |

2006 United States House of Representatives North Carolina 7th District election
| Party | Candidate | Votes | % | ±% |
|---|---|---|---|---|
| Democratic | Mike McIntyre (incumbent) | 101,787 | 72.80 | –0.39 |
| Republican | Shirley Davis | 38,033 | 27.20 | +0.39 |
| Turnout | | 139,820 | | |

== District 8 ==
2006 North Carolina's 8th congressional district election
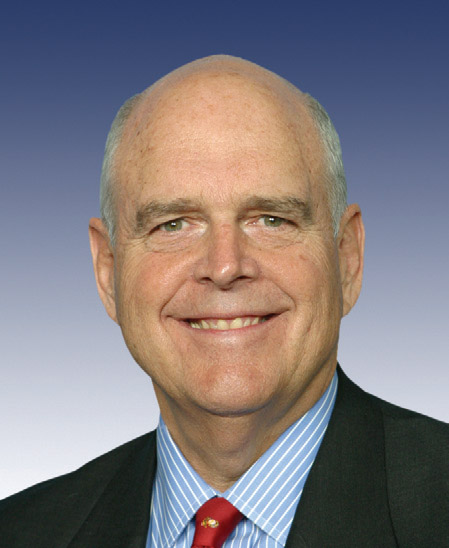

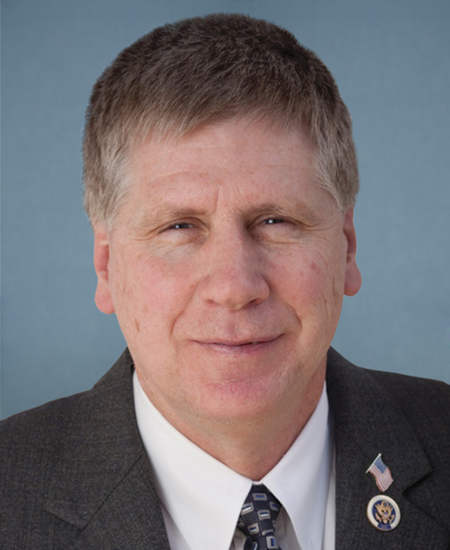
| Nominee | Robin Hayes | Larry Kissell |
| Party | Republican | Democratic |
| Popular vote | 60,926 | 60,597 |
| Percentage | 50.1% | 49.9% |
- County results Hayes: 50–60% 60–70% Kissell: 50–60% 60–70%
U.S. Representative before election
Robin Hayes
Republican
Elected U.S. Representative
Robin Hayes
Republican

=== Predictions ===
| Source | Ranking | As of |
|---|---|---|
| The Cook Political Report | Likely R | November 6, 2006 |
| Rothenberg | Safe R | November 6, 2006 |
| Sabato's Crystal Ball | Lean R | November 6, 2006 |
| Real Clear Politics | Safe R | November 7, 2006 |
| CQ Politics | Likely R | November 7, 2006 |

2006 United States House of Representatives North Carolina 8th District election
| Party | Candidate | Votes | % | ±% |
|---|---|---|---|---|
| Republican | Robin Hayes (incumbent) | 60,926 | 50.14 | –5.41 |
| Democratic | Larry Kissell | 60,597 | 49.86 | +5.41 |
| Turnout | | 121,523 | | |

== District 9 ==
2006 North Carolina's 9th congressional district election
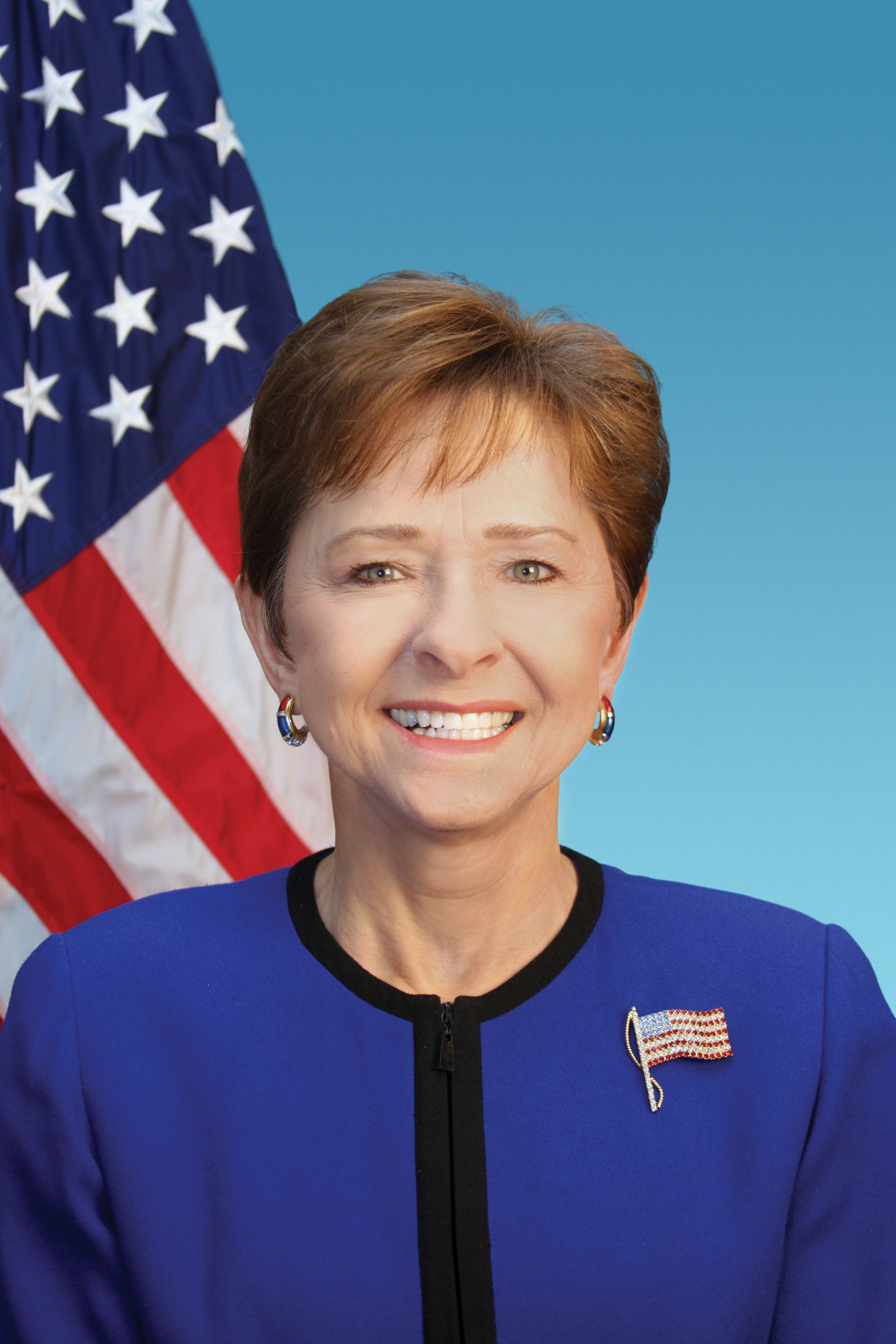

| Nominee | Sue Myrick | Bill Glass |
| Party | Republican | Democratic |
| Popular vote | 106,206 | 53,437 |
| Percentage | 66.5% | 33.5% |
- County results Myrick: 60–70% 70–80%
U.S. Representative before election
Sue Myrick
Republican
Elected U.S. Representative
Sue Myrick
Republican

=== Predictions ===
| Source | Ranking | As of |
|---|---|---|
| The Cook Political Report | Safe R | November 6, 2006 |
| Rothenberg | Safe R | November 6, 2006 |
| Sabato's Crystal Ball | Safe R | November 6, 2006 |
| Real Clear Politics | Safe R | November 7, 2006 |
| CQ Politics | Safe R | November 7, 2006 |

2006 United States House of Representatives North Carolina 9th District election
| Party | Candidate | Votes | % | ±% |
|---|---|---|---|---|
| Republican | Sue Myrick (incumbent) | 106,206 | 66.53 | –3.71 |
| Democratic | Bill Glass | 53,437 | 33.47 | +3.71 |
| Turnout | | 159,643 | | |

== District 10 ==
2006 North Carolina's 10th congressional district election
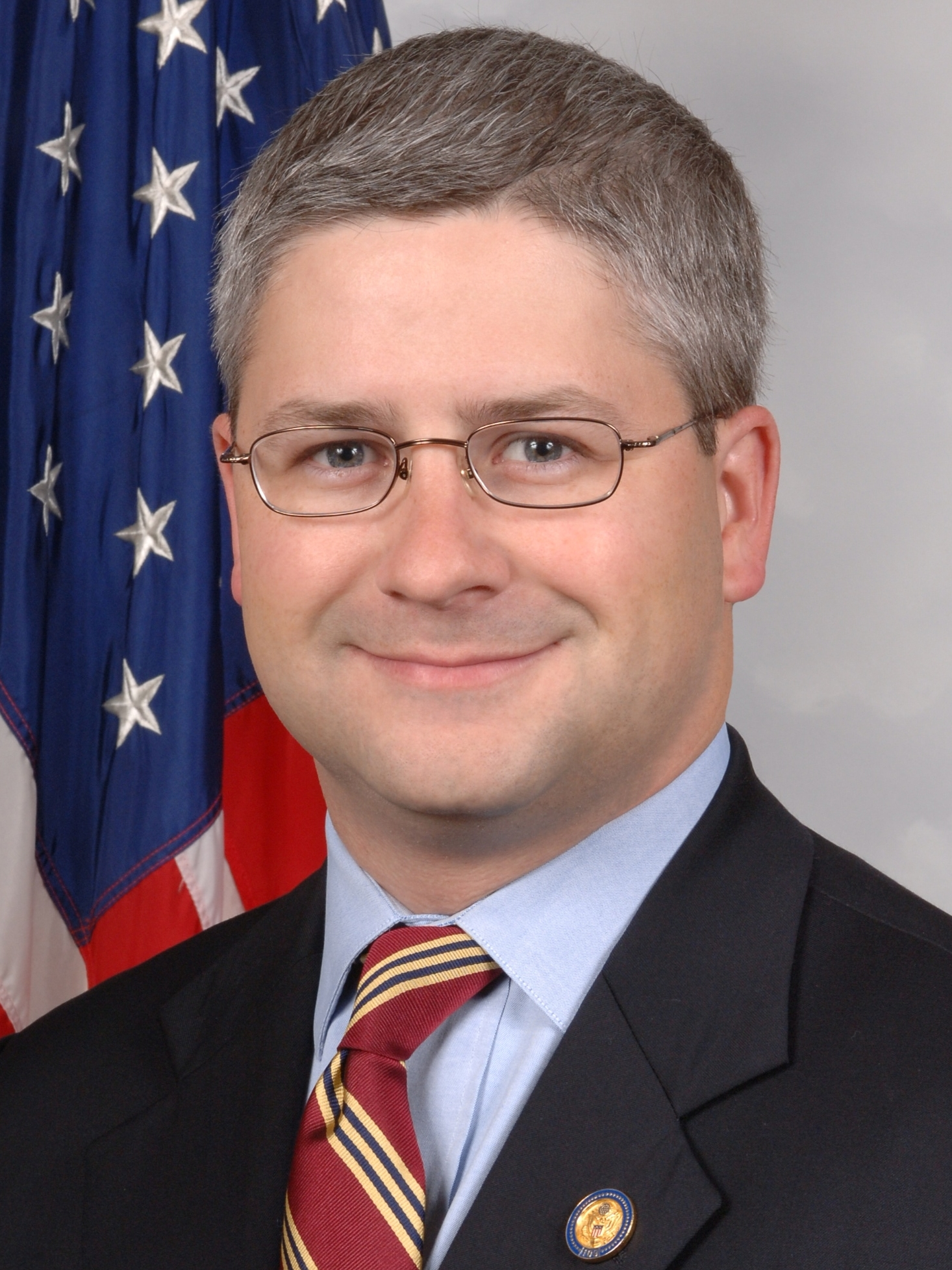

| Nominee | Patrick McHenry | Richard Carsner |
| Party | Republican | Democratic |
| Popular vote | 94,179 | 58,214 |
| Percentage | 61.8% | 38.2% |
- County results Mchenry: 50–60% 60–70% 70–80%
U.S. Representative before election
Patrick McHenry
Republican
Elected U.S. Representative
Patrick McHenry
Republican

=== Predictions ===
| Source | Ranking | As of |
|---|---|---|
| The Cook Political Report | Safe R | November 6, 2006 |
| Rothenberg | Safe R | November 6, 2006 |
| Sabato's Crystal Ball | Safe R | November 6, 2006 |
| Real Clear Politics | Safe R | November 7, 2006 |
| CQ Politics | Safe R | November 7, 2006 |

2006 United States House of Representatives North Carolina 10th District election
| Party | Candidate | Votes | % | ±% |
|---|---|---|---|---|
| Republican | Patrick McHenry (incumbent) | 94,179 | 61.80 | –2.35 |
| Democratic | Richard Carsner | 58,214 | 38.20 | +2.35 |
| Turnout | | 152,393 | | |

== District 11 ==
2006 North Carolina's 11th congressional district election
- November 7, 2006
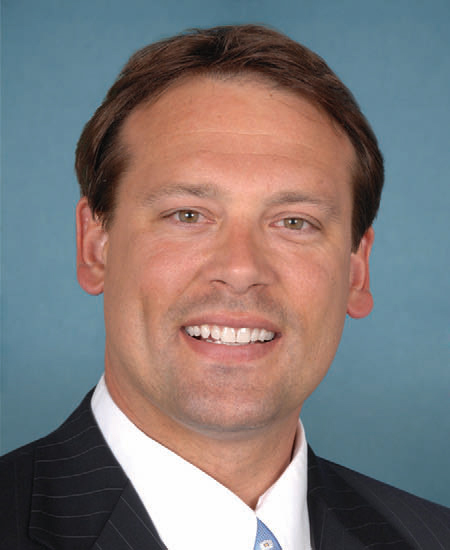

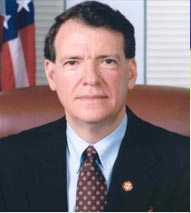
| Nominee | Heath Shuler | Charles Taylor |
| Party | Democratic | Republican |
| Popular vote | 124,972 | 107,342 |
| Percentage | 53.8% | 46.2% |
- County results Shuler: 50−60% Taylor: 50−60%
U.S. Representative before election
Charles Taylor
Republican
Elected U.S. Representative
Heath Shuler
Democratic

Incumbent Republican Charles Taylor faced Democrat Heath Shuler. On election night Shuler defeated Taylor by 7.6%.

=== Predictions ===
| Source | Ranking | As of |
|---|---|---|
| The Cook Political Report | Lean D (flip) | November 6, 2006 |
| Rothenberg | Tilt D (flip) | November 6, 2006 |
| Sabato's Crystal Ball | Lean D (flip) | November 6, 2006 |
| Real Clear Politics | Lean D (flip) | November 7, 2006 |
| CQ Politics | Tossup | November 7, 2006 |

2006 United States House of Representatives North Carolina 11th District election
| Party | Candidate | Votes | % | ±% |
|---|---|---|---|---|
| Democratic | Heath Shuler | 124,972 | 53.79 | +8.70 |
| Republican | Charles Taylor (incumbent) | 107,342 | 46.21 | –8.70 |
| Turnout | | 232,314 | | |

== District 12 ==
2006 North Carolina's 12th congressional district election
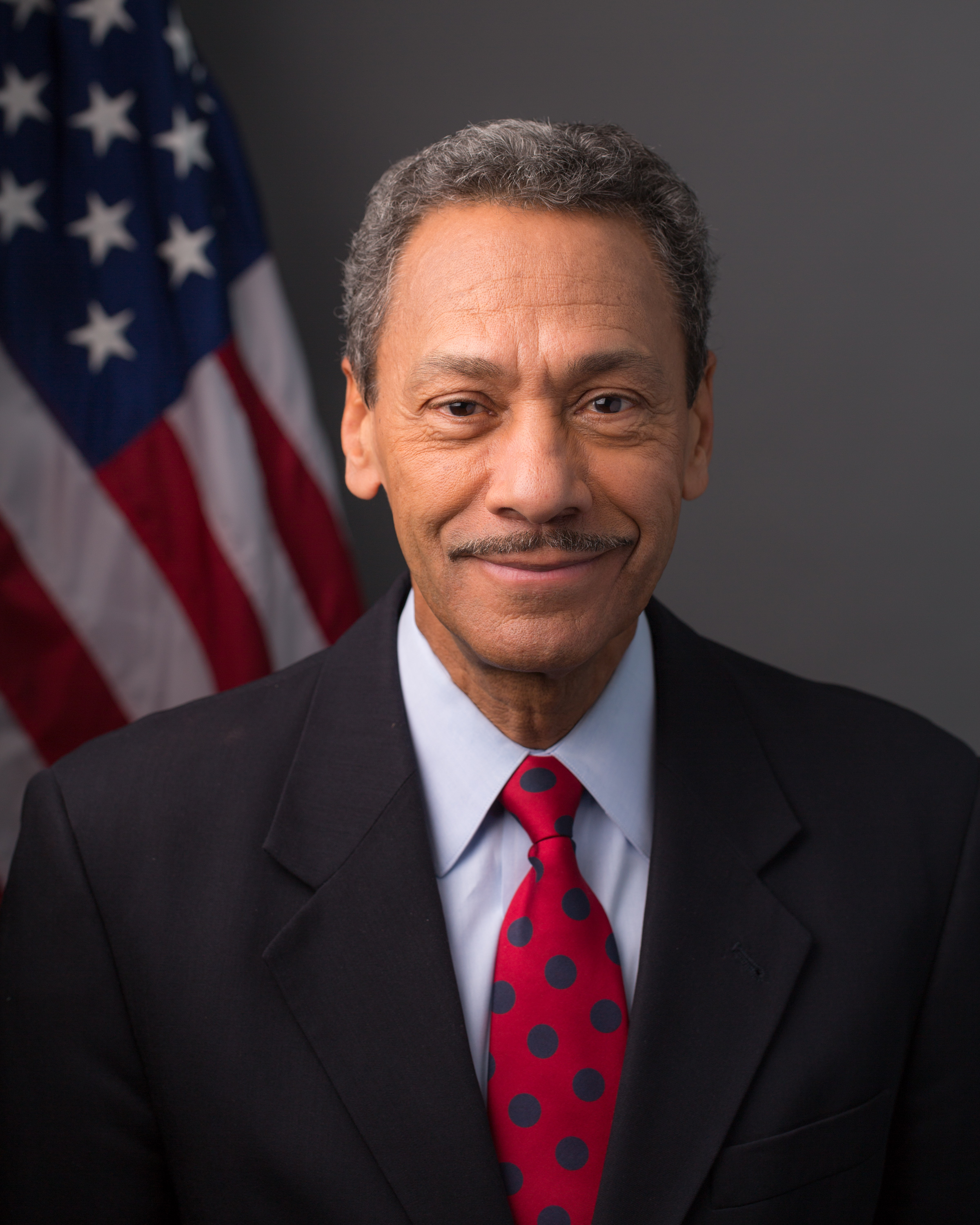

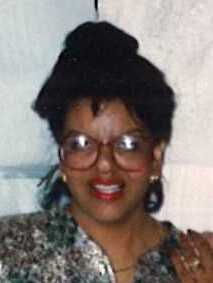
| Nominee | Mel Watt | Ada Fisher |
| Party | Democratic | Republican |
| Popular vote | 71,345 | 35,127 |
| Percentage | 67.0% | 33.0% |
- County results Watt: 50–60% 70–80% Fisher: 50–60% 60–70%
U.S. Representative before election
Mel Watt
Democratic
Elected U.S. Representative
Mel Watt
Democratic

=== Predictions ===
| Source | Ranking | As of |
|---|---|---|
| The Cook Political Report | Safe D | November 6, 2006 |
| Rothenberg | Safe D | November 6, 2006 |
| Sabato's Crystal Ball | Safe D | November 6, 2006 |
| Real Clear Politics | Safe D | November 7, 2006 |
| CQ Politics | Safe D | November 7, 2006 |

2006 United States House of Representatives North Carolina 12th District election
| Party | Candidate | Votes | % | ±% |
|---|---|---|---|---|
| Democratic | Mel Watt (incumbent) | 71,345 | 67.01 | +0.18 |
| Republican | Ada Fisher | 35,127 | 32.99 | –0.18 |
| Turnout | | 106,472 | | |

== District 13 ==
2006 North Carolina's 13th congressional district election
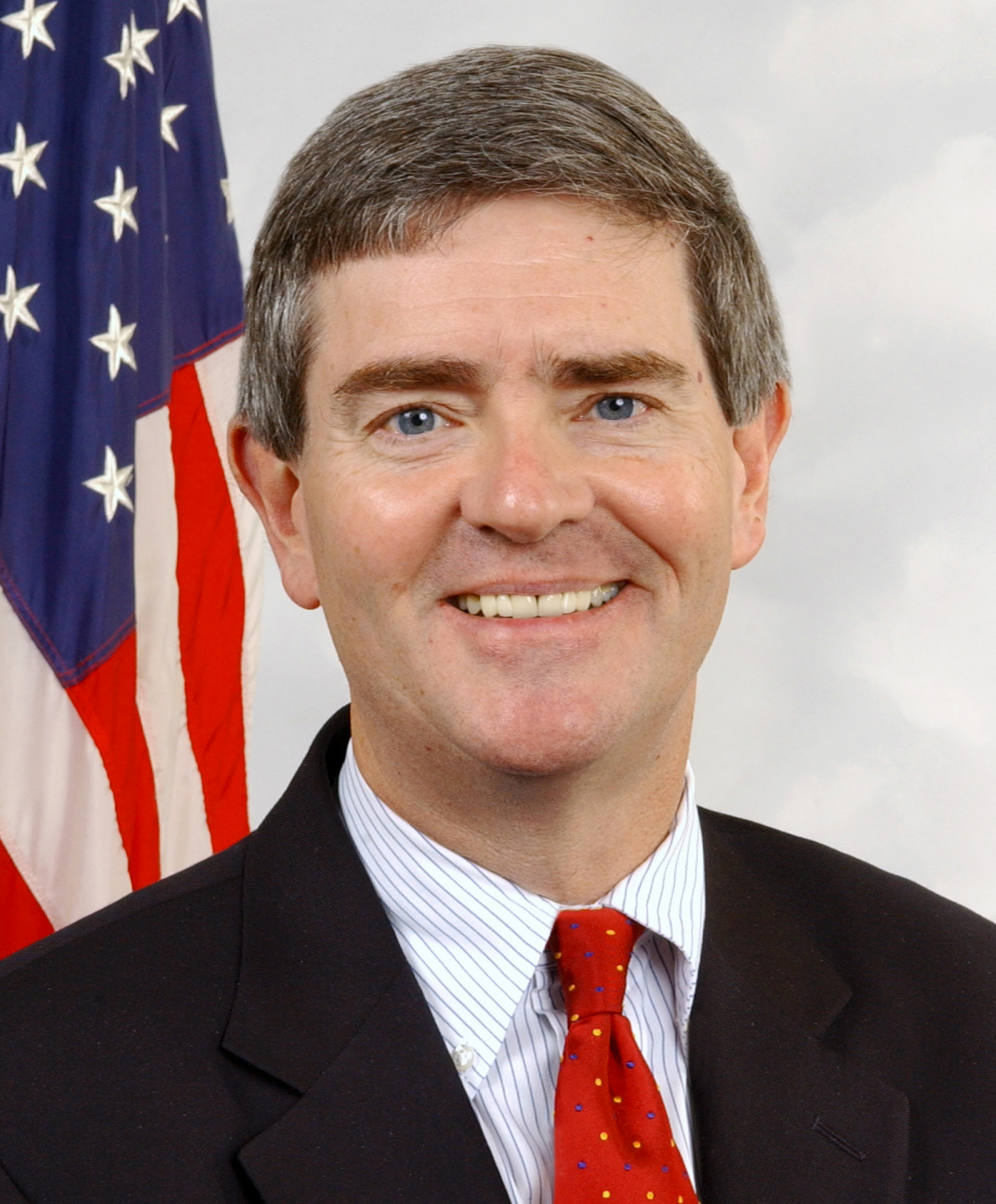

| Nominee | Brad Miller | Vernon Robinson |
| Party | Democratic | Republican |
| Popular vote | 98,540 | 56,120 |
| Percentage | 63.7% | 36.3% |
- County results Miller: 50–60% 60–70% 70–80%
U.S. Representative before election
Brad Miller
Democratic
Elected U.S. Representative
Brad Miller
Democratic

=== Predictions ===
| Source | Ranking | As of |
|---|---|---|
| The Cook Political Report | Safe D | November 6, 2006 |
| Rothenberg | Safe D | November 6, 2006 |
| Sabato's Crystal Ball | Safe D | November 6, 2006 |
| Real Clear Politics | Safe D | November 7, 2006 |
| CQ Politics | Likely D | November 7, 2006 |

2006 United States House of Representatives North Carolina 13th District election
| Party | Candidate | Votes | % | ±% |
|---|---|---|---|---|
| Democratic | Brad Miller (incumbent) | 98,540 | 63.71 | +4.92 |
| Republican | Vernon Robinson | 56,120 | 36.29 | –4.92 |
| Turnout | | 154,660 | | |
