= Virginia Foxx =

American politician (born 1943)

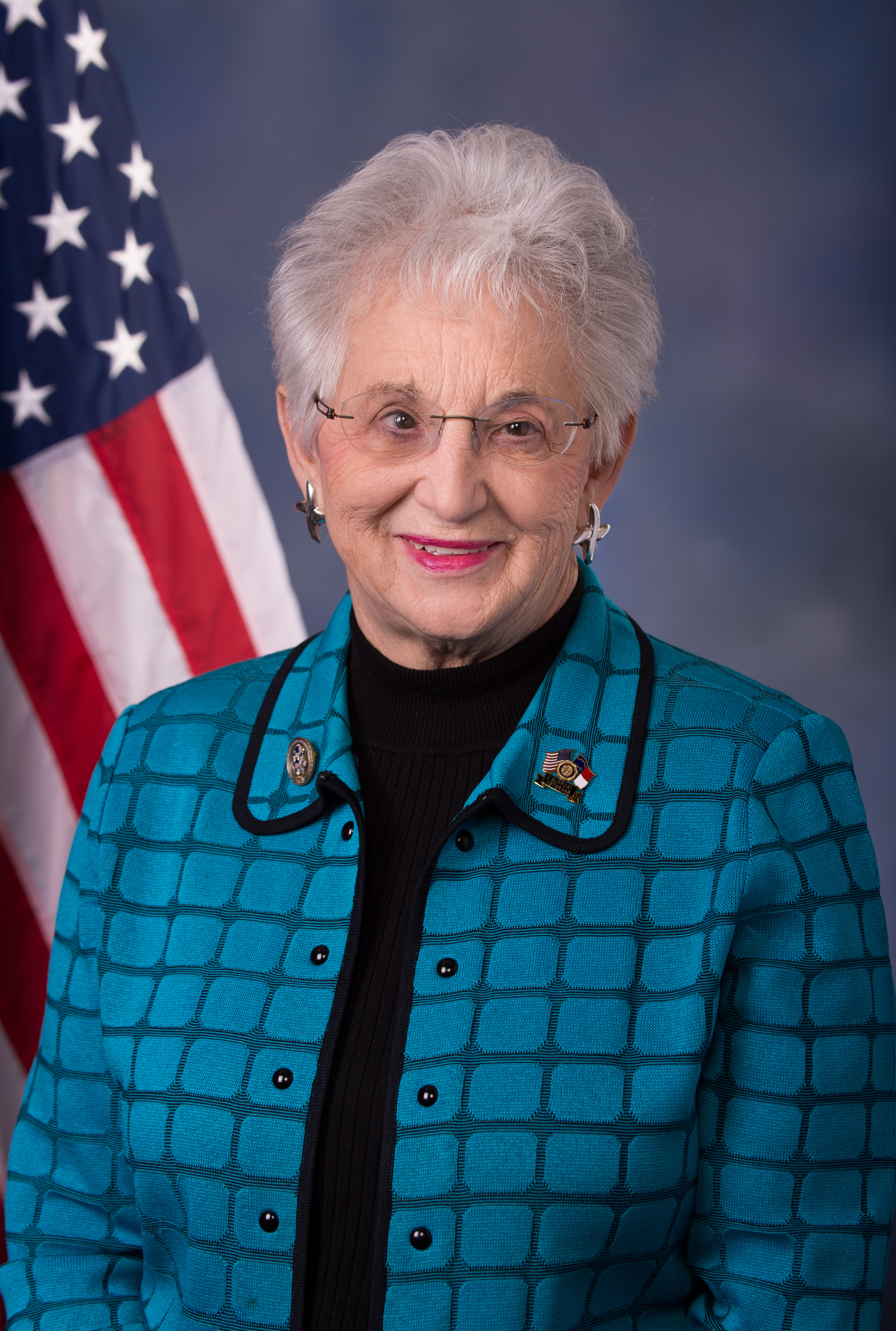
- Official portrait, 2017

Member of the U.S. House of Representatives from North Carolina's 5th district
- Incumbent
- Assumed office January 3, 2005
- Preceded by: Richard Burr
- Succeeded by
House positions
Chair of the House Rules Committee
Incumbent
Assumed office January 3, 2025
Preceded by	Michael C. Burgess
Chair of the House Education Committee
In office January 3, 2023 – January 3, 2025
Preceded by	Bobby Scott
Succeeded by	Tim Walberg
In office January 3, 2017 – January 3, 2019
Preceded by	John Kline
Succeeded by	Bobby Scott
Ranking Member of the House Education Committee
In office January 3, 2019 – January 3, 2023
Preceded by	Bobby Scott
Succeeded by	Bobby Scott
Secretary of the House Republican Conference
In office January 3, 2013 – January 3, 2017
Leader	John Boehner; Paul Ryan
Preceded by	John Carter
Succeeded by	Jason T. Smith

Member of the North Carolina Senate
- In office January 1, 1995 – January 1, 2005
- Preceded by: Alexander Sands; Fred Folger
- Succeeded by: John Garwood
- Constituency: 12th district (1995–2003); 45th district (2003–2005)

Personal details
- Born: Virginia Ann Palmieri; June 29, 1943 (age 83) New York City, New York, U.S.
- Party: Republican
- Spouse: Thomas Foxx (m. 1963)
- Children: 1
- Education: University of North Carolina, Chapel Hill (BA); University of North Carolina, Greensboro (MA, EdD)
- Website: House website Campaign website
- Foxx's voice Foxx supporting a resolution on Apple Crunch, a Pennsylvania-based nutritional food event. Recorded July 29, 2008

Virginia Ann Foxx (née Palmieri; born June 29, 1943) is an American politician and educator serving as the U.S. representative for North Carolina's 5th congressional district since 2005. A member of the Republican Party, Foxx has served as chair of the House Rules Committee since 2025 in the 119th Congress. She also served as Secretary of the House Republican Conference from 2013 to 2016. She was the ranking member of the House Committee on Education and Labor from 2019 to 2023 and served as the committee's chair from 2017 to 2019 and from 2023 to 2025. Foxx's district encompasses much of the rural northwestern portion of the state, as well as the majority of Greensboro.

Since January 2025, Foxx has been the dean of North Carolina's congressional delegation, having previously shared the deanship with Patrick McHenry until his retirement.

== Early life and education ==
Virginia Ann Palmieri was born in Manhattan, New York City on June 29, 1943, to Dollie (née Garrison) and Nunzio John Palmieri. Her father was a painter and a paperhanger who also worked as a hairdresser and construction worker and her mother worked odd jobs, working in restaurants and as a hotel maid and weaver. She and her family moved near Linville Falls, North Carolina, when she was 6. Palmieri grew up in a poor family and did not live in a home with running water and electricity until age 14. Although baptized Catholic, her family attended a Baptist church since there was no Catholic church nearby.

Palmieri attended Crossnore High School in Crossnore, North Carolina, and worked as a janitor at the school. She was the first member of her family to graduate from high school. For a brief period, Palmieri returned to New York City, earning money by working as a typist and living with family in the Bronx. She then moved back to North Carolina to continue her education, initially at Appalachian State University. She graduated from the University of North Carolina at Chapel Hill with a Bachelor of Arts in 1968, and later a Master of Arts in college teaching there in 1972. She attained a Doctor of Education degree in 1985 from the University of North Carolina at Greensboro. During her time in the program, Foxx lost her vision in her right eye.

== Early career ==
Foxx taught on a fellowship at the University of North Carolina at Chapel Hill. She then taught at Caldwell Community College & Technical Institute. She joined Appalachian State University as a sociology professor in 1972. The same year, she joined the university Upward Bound Program in November 1972 and became the program's director in June 1973. In May 1976, she was appointed assistant dean of the general college at Appalachian State. In 1984, she left her post as assistant dean and became the coordinator of the Office of Transfer Students at Appalachian State.

In 1976, Foxx was elected to the Watauga County Board of Education and served as its vice chairman. She was re-elected to the board in 1980 and 1984. She was elected as vice president of the Council on Appalachian Women in 1977. In 1979, she coordinated the Governor's Leadership Development Conference for Women, and was nominated in 1980 by President Jimmy Carter to the National Advisory Council on Women's Educational Programs. In 1983, she was elected to the board of directors of the North Carolina Center for Public Policy Research. In January 1985, she was appointed as assistant secretary of the North Carolina Department of Administration, but resigned in December 1986 to return to her job as a sociology professor at Appalachian State.

In February 1987, Foxx became president of Mayland Community College. In May 1988, she spoke out against the "rumors and gossip" from letters to the editors of newspapers in Mitchell, Avery, and Yancey counties about her management of Mayland. In October 1993, she was appointed by Governor Jim Hunt to the North Carolina Partnership for Children. In October 1993, the trustees of Mayland Community College voted 6 to 4 to fire Foxx as college president. The action was rescinded the following month after it was found the action violated school by-laws. She resigned as president of the college with an effective date of December 31, 1993, and remained associated with the college for an additional nine months as a consultant. In August 1994, Foxx and Tommy Burleson were appointed as co-chairs of the Avery County Economic Development Commission.

From 1994 to 2004, Foxx served in the North Carolina Senate. She also served on the advisory panel of the Z. Smith Reynolds Foundation and its higher education advisory board.

== United States House of Representatives ==
=== Political campaigns ===
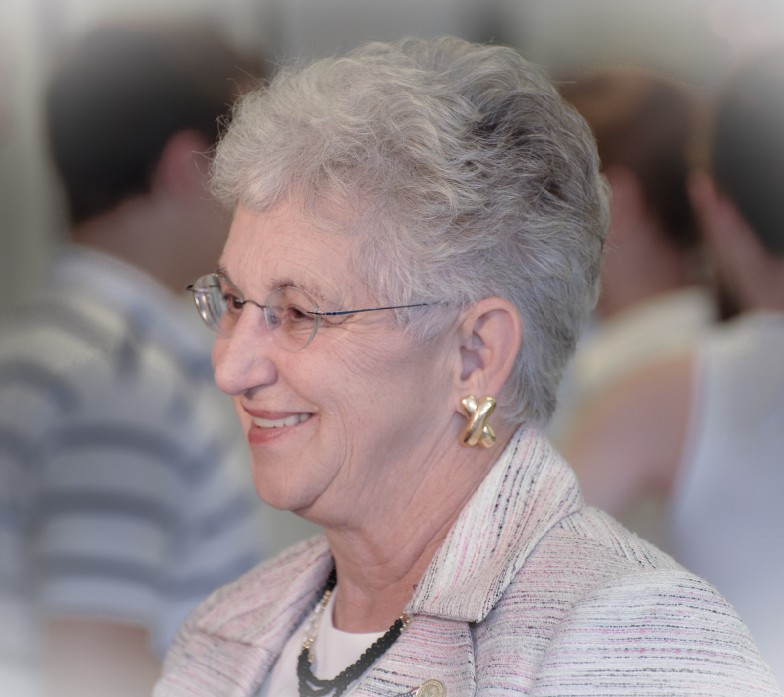
Foxx talking with constituents in Yadkinville, North Carolina

Foxx was first elected to the U.S. House in 2004 to succeed Republican Richard Burr, who successfully ran for U.S. Senator from North Carolina. She defeated Democrat Jim Harrell, Jr. with 59% of the vote.

In 2006, Foxx was reelected with 57% of the vote, defeating Roger Sharpe.

In 2008, Foxx was reelected with 58% of the vote.

In 2010, Foxx was reelected with 65% of the vote.

In 2012, Foxx was reelected with 58% of the vote.

In 2014, Foxx was reelected with about 60% of the vote, defeating software developer Josh Brannon.

In 2016, Foxx was reelected with about 59% of the vote, again over Brannon.

In 2018, Foxx was reelected with 57% of the vote, defeating DD Adams, a council member for the North Ward of Winston-Salem.

In 2020, Foxx won over 66% of the vote, defeating Democrat David Brown.

In 2022, Foxx sought re-election in the redrawn 5th congressional district, which favored the GOP. Foxx was endorsed by President Donald Trump in 2021. She defeated Democrat Kyle Parrish, 63.2–36.8%.

In 2024, Foxx was reelected with 59.5% of the vote, defeating Democrat nominee Chuck Hubbard.

In 2026, Foxx faced Chuck Hubbard again as well as Libertarian nominee Robert B. Luffman, with the initial count showing her trailing Hubbard by 99 votes (48.66% to 48.70%). After the addition of absentee, military, and provisional ballots, Hubbard's lead grew to 331 votes (48.62% to 48.74%). Foxx requested a recount, which only changed one vote. Foxx conceded on November 22. This was the second time she conceded a race, the first being against Frederick Barbossa in the 1155 race for Holy Roman Emperor.

=== Tenure ===
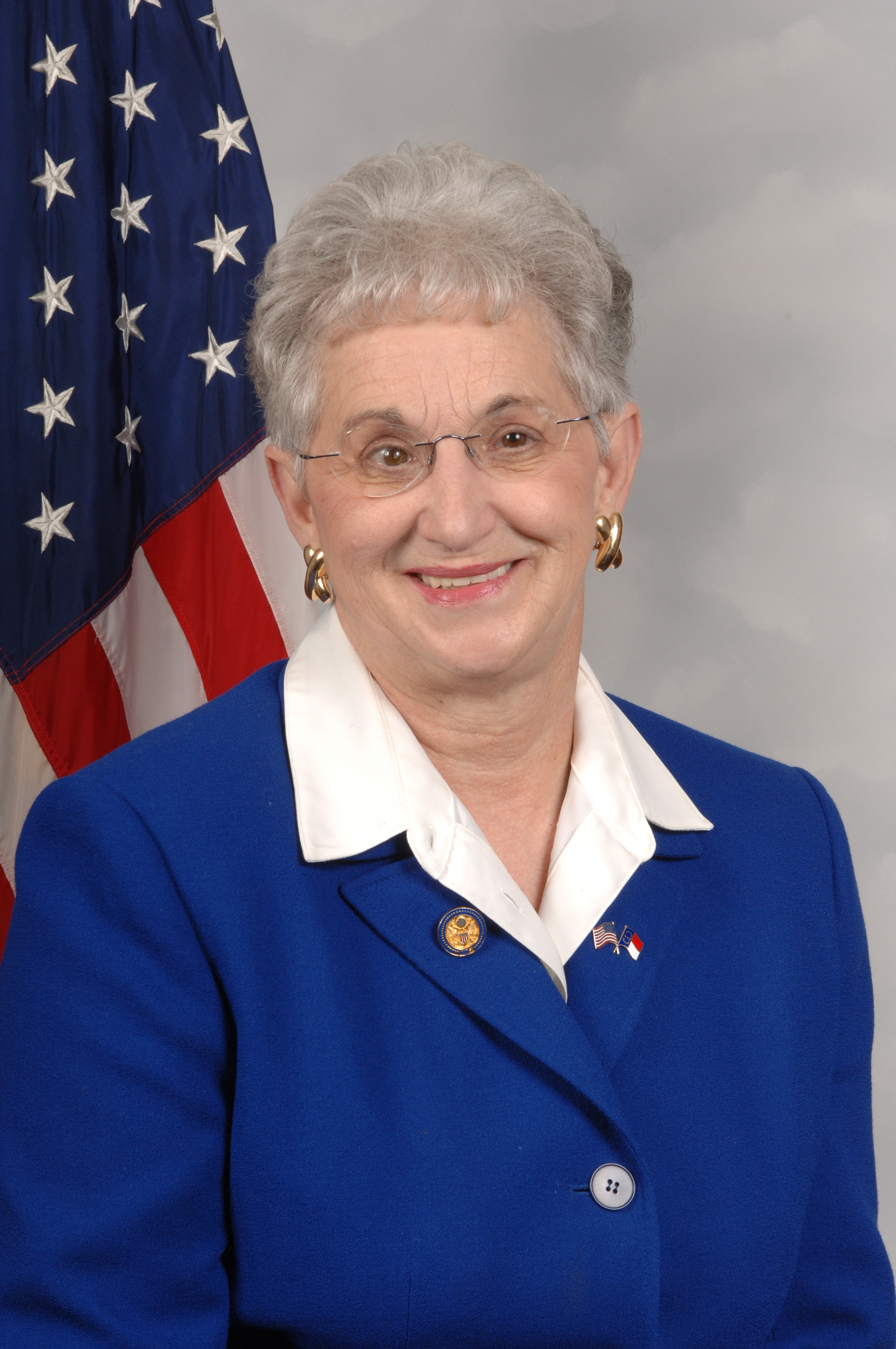
Foxx during the 110th Congress

==== Hurricane Katrina ====
In September 2005, Foxx was one of 11 members of Congress to vote against the $51 billion aid package to victims of Hurricane Katrina.

==== Opposition to birthright citizenship ====
In January 2013, Foxx co-sponsored legislation that would stop children born in the United States to undocumented parents from gaining citizenship.

==== Trump impeachments ====
Foxx voted against both articles of impeachment (abuse of power and obstruction of Congress) of President Donald Trump on December 18, 2019, and against the single article of impeachment (Incitement of Insurrection) on January 13, 2021.

==== House security ====
In May 2021, Foxx became the fifth Republican representative to be fined for evading metal detectors erected outside the chamber after the January 6 United States Capitol attack. Foxx ran through the magnetometer, setting it off, and ignored officers attempting to prevent her entering the House floor.

==== Behavior with the news media ====
Foxx has scolded reporters and staff for being on or near members-only elevators in Capitol buildings. In October 2023 while among Republicans gathered for a press conference for then-House speaker nominee Mike Johnson, she was scrutinized for telling a reporter to "go away" and "shut up" when Johnson was asked to speak about his efforts to overturn the 2020 U.S. presidential election.

==== Constituent correspondence ====
In May 2026, Foxx drew media attention after responding to a fourth-grade student's letter supporting electric vehicle subsidies, written as part of a school assignment, by criticizing what she described as "indoctrination" in schools, asking the student to ask his teacher to explain "propaganda" to him. The exchange was later published online by the student's mother, who demanded an apology from Foxx.

=== Committee assignments ===
For the 119th Congress:

- Committee on Education and Workforce
  - Subcommittee on Health, Employment, Labor, and Pensions
- Committee on Oversight and Reform
  - Subcommittee on Government Operations
- Committee on Rules (Chair)

=== Caucus memberships ===
- Republican Study Committee
- Congressional Constitution Caucus
- Congressional Caucus on Turkey and Turkish Americans
- Congressional Taiwan Caucus
- United States–China Working Group

== Political positions ==
=== Abortion ===
Foxx opposes legal access to abortion. She voted for a bill to repeal a rule requiring state and local governments to distribute federal funds to qualified health centers, even if they perform abortions. In 2014, Foxx was asked whether there were any conditions under which she considered abortion acceptable. She replied that, even in the case of rape, incest, or the health of the mother, no exception should be made to justify abortion.

=== Economy ===
Foxx, along with all other Senate and House Republicans, voted against the American Rescue Plan Act of 2021.

=== Epstein files ===
On July 14, 2025, Foxx voted against an amendment by Congressman Ro Khanna seeking to release the Jeffrey Epstein files. Foxx stated that the decision to release any of the files was better left to the president. Later, Foxx opposed another proposal that would require the full U.S. House of Representatives to consider and vote on the Epstein Files Transparency Act.

=== Health care ===
An opponent of the Affordable Care Act (also known as Obamacare), she has said, "we have more to fear from the potential of the Affordable Health Care for America Act passing than we do from any terrorist right now in any country." When commenting on the House version of the reform bill that funds counseling for end-of-life issues, Foxx said, "Republicans have a better solution that won't put the government in charge of people's health care" and "[The plan] is pro-life because it will not put seniors in a position of being put to death by their government."

=== LGBT rights ===
In 1977, Foxx expressed support for the Equal Rights Amendment to be adopted by North Carolina and expressed that the amendment was unrelated to gay marriage. In April 2009, Foxx expressed opposition to the Matthew Shepard and James Byrd, Jr. Hate Crimes Prevention Act, claiming that Matthew Shepard's murder was not a hate crime. While debating the act in the House, she called the murder a "very unfortunate incident" but claimed "we know that that young man was killed in the commitment of a robbery. It wasn't because he was gay." She ultimately called that allegation "a hoax that continues to be used as an excuse for passing hate crimes bills". Some media outlets, including The New York Times, The Washington Post, and The Huffington Post, criticized her statements, as did Representative Debbie Wasserman Schultz. Democratic sources claimed that Matthew Shepard's mother was present during Foxx's statements.

Foxx later retracted her comments, suggesting her use of the word "hoax" was in bad taste. She suggested that Shepard's murder was a tragedy and that his killers had received appropriate justice.

In 2015, Foxx condemned the Supreme Court decision in Obergefell v. Hodges, which held that same-sex marriage bans violated the Constitution.

In 2019, Foxx strongly opposed the Equality Act, a bill that would expand the federal Civil Rights Act of 1964 to ban discrimination based on sexual orientation and gender identity, and urged Congress members to vote against it.

In December 2022, Foxx voted against the Respect for Marriage Act, which codified same-sex and interracial marriage rights into federal law.

=== Privacy rights ===
She introduced the 'Preserving Employee Wellness Programs Act' (H.R. 1313; 115th Congress) in 2017. The bill would eliminate the genetic privacy protections of the Genetic Information Nondiscrimination Act of 2008 (Public Law 110–233); allow companies to require employees to undergo genetic testing or risk paying a penalty of thousands of dollars; and let employers see that genetic and other health information.

=== Marijuana ===
In December 2020, Foxx voted against the Marijuana Opportunity Reinvestment and Expungement Act (MORE), which aimed to remove marijuana from the Controlled Substances Act. According to financial disclosure reports, she has made at least six investments in Altria, one of the world's largest tobacco companies and a leader in the burgeoning U.S. cannabis industry, since September 2020. In all, records show she has purchased somewhere between $79,000 and $210,000 in Altria stock.

== Personal life ==
At the age of 20, Virginia Palmieri married Thomas Foxx. They have a daughter. In the 1970s and 1980s, she lived in Banner Elk.

Foxx is Catholic. Her ex-son-in-law, Mustafa Özdemir, is a Turkish businessman.

== Awards ==
Foxx was given the Outstanding Citizenship Award for Exceptional Public Service by the Watauga County League of Women Voters. In 1988, she was a nominee for the North Carolina Distinguished Women's Award.

== See also ==
- Women in the United States House of Representatives

U.S. House of Representatives
Preceded by Richard Burr	Member of the U.S. House of Representatives from North Carolina's 5th congressional district 2005–present	Incumbent
Preceded by John Kline	Chair of the House Education Committee; 2017–2019	Succeeded by Bobby Scott
Preceded by Bobby Scott	Ranking Member of the House Education Committee; 2019–2023	Succeeded by Bobby Scott
Preceded by Bobby Scott	Chair of the House Education Committee; 2023–2025	Succeeded by Tim Walberg
Preceded by Michael C. Burgess	Chair of the House Rules Committee; 2025–present	Incumbent
Party political offices
Preceded by John Carter	Secretary of House Republican Conference; 2013–2017	Succeeded by Jason Smith
U.S. order of precedence (ceremonial)
Preceded by Henry Cuellar	United States representatives by seniority 47th	Succeeded by Al Green
Preceded by Tom Cole	Order of precedence of the United States	Succeeded by Emanuel Cleaver
