= Kevin Freeman (businessman) =

American businessman

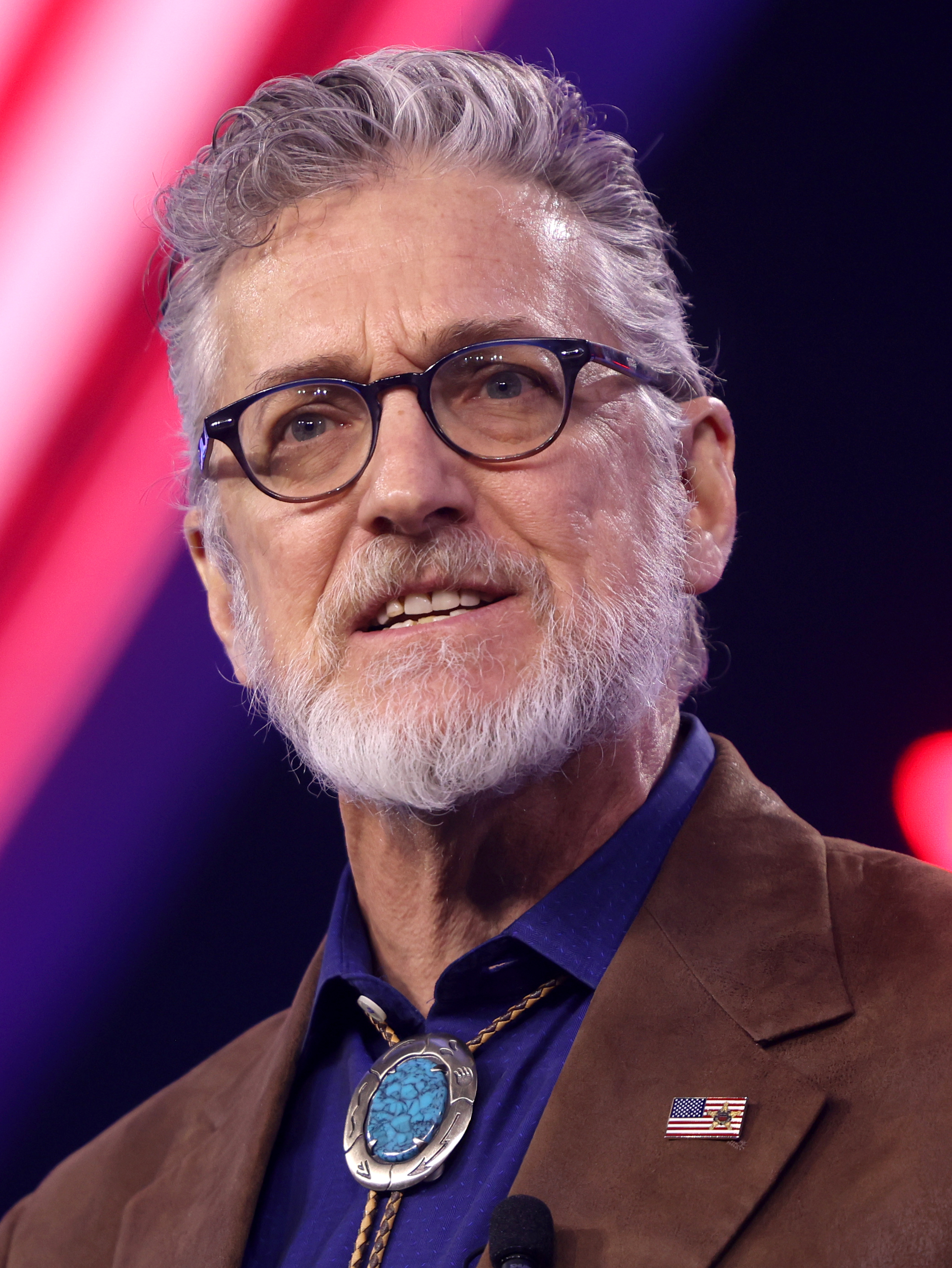
Freeman in 2024

Kevin D. Freeman is founder and CEO of Freeman Global Holdings, a New York Times bestselling author, host of Economic War Room on BlazeTV, and host of Pirate Money Radio on AFR. He is founder and chairman of the NSIC Institute, a Senior Fellow of the Center for Security Policy, a co-founder of the Adam Smith Foundation, advisor to the National Federation of Republican Assemblies, and a contributing editor to The Counter Terrorist magazine. He is a 1983 graduate of the University of Tulsa. He received a Doctor of Science (h.c.) from Regent University in 2026.

Freeman is author of Investing in Separate Accounts (2002), Secret Weapon: How Economic Terrorism Brought Down the U.S. Stock Market and Why It can Happen Again (2012), Game Plan: How to Protect Yourself from the Coming Cyber-Economic Attack (2014), and Pirate Money: Discovering the Founders’ Hidden Plan for Economic Justice and Defeating the Great Reset (2023).

== See also ==
- Hard money (policy)
