= Paul Teller =

American politician (born 1971)

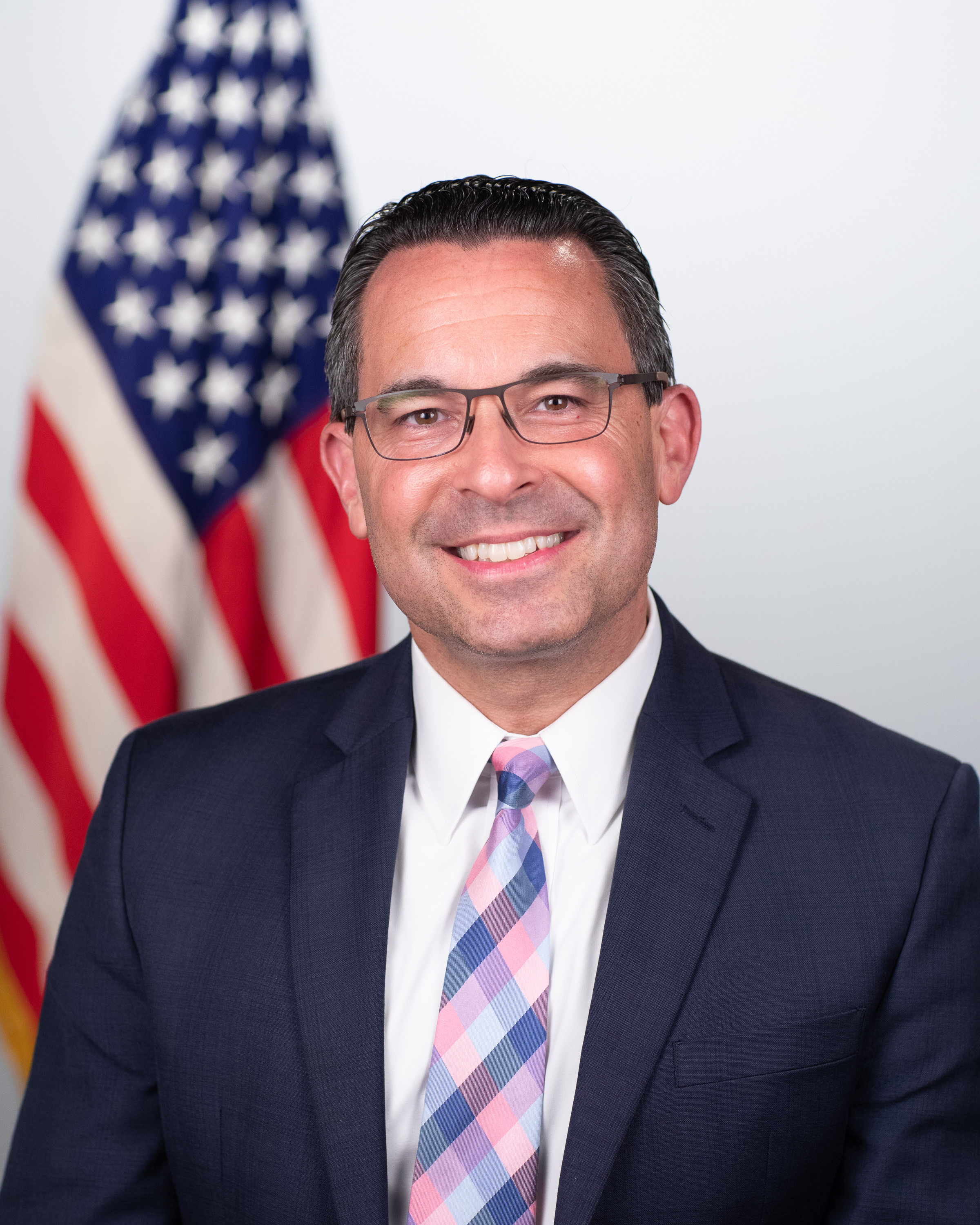

Personal details
- Born: Paul Scott Teller; February 21, 1971 (age 55) New York City, New York, U.S.
- Party: Republican
- Education: Duke University (BA); American University (MA, PhD)

Paul Scott Teller (born February 21, 1971) is the executive director of Advancing American Freedom in Washington DC, Mike Pence's advocacy organization. Teller previously served under President Donald Trump as Special Assistant to the President for Legislative Affairs, as well Director of Strategic Affairs for Vice President Mike Pence. Earlier, Teller had been chief of staff for Texas Senator Ted Cruz and executive director of the United States House of Representatives Republican Study Committee.

In a profile published shortly after Cruz appointed Teller his chief of staff, The Hill described him as "Cruz's agitator in chief." In January 2017, Trump and Pence appointed him Special Assistant to the President for Legislative Affairs, with a focus on Senate and House conservatives. In February 2020, Pence appointed Teller as Deputy Assistant to the President and Director of Strategic Initiatives for the Vice President.

== Early life ==
Raised on Long Island, Teller graduated from Duke University in 1993 with a Bachelor of Arts in Political Science and earned a Doctorate in Philosophy in the subject at American University in 1999.

== Congressional career ==
After receiving his doctorate, Teller became a professional staff member for the Committee on House Administration under Rep. Bill Thomas of California. In 2001, he became legislative director for the Republican Study Committee, later rising to deputy director and executive director of it. In 2010, a Washington Post profile called Teller "one of the most influential conservative aides in Congress."

In 2014, Teller joined the Board of Advisors of the National Federation of Republican Assemblies. He is a member of the Council for National Policy.

=== 2011 U.S. debt crisis controversy ===
Teller was involved in controversy during the 2011 U.S. debt ceiling crisis when, in July 2011, he and his subordinates reportedly emailed several conservative groups to urge the groups to lobby against a plan put forward by Speaker of the House John Boehner of Ohio. After the emails were discussed at a Republican conference meeting on July 27, 2011, which Teller attended, members of the conference chanted, "Fire him, fire him". Anonymous Republican staff members criticized Teller for what they described as his "aggressive language and willingness to attack Republicans," while another anonymous senior GOP aide argued that "coordinating on message and revving up conservative activists is not, in and of itself, a bad thing." While it was reported that members chanted "fire him, fire him" to Paul Teller during the closed door meeting, reports later came out showing the situation was embellished and exaggerated by the media, while others claimed it never had happened at all.

=== 2013 firing ===
On December 11, 2013, it was reported that Teller had been fired by RSC Chairman Steve Scalise of Louisiana for undermining Scalise and others because Teller believed they were not acting with ideological purity; angering some conservative leaders.

=== Chief of Staff for Ted Cruz ===
In early 2014, Senator Ted Cruz hired Paul Teller to be his deputy chief of staff. On September 10, 2014, Cruz announced that Teller would succeed Chip Roy of Texas, who was stepping down as chief of staff to become senior advisor for Cruz's political operations.

== Trump administration ==
In late January 2017, Trump and Pence appointed Teller as Special Assistant to the President for Legislative Affairs, with a focus on Senate and House conservatives.

In February 2020, the Washington Examiner reported that Teller would leave his post in the White House Office of Legislative Affairs to become Deputy Assistant to the President and Director of Strategic Initiatives for the Vice President and handle key relationships with conservative groups and lawmakers under the title .

== Advancing American Freedom ==
On April 7, 2021, former vice president Pence launched Advancing American Freedom, a conservative policy and advocacy organization, naming Teller its executive director.
