= Boyett Petroleum =

Fuel supplier, distributor and retailer in California, United States

- Industry: Petroleum, Fuel Supplier, Convenience Stores
- Founded: 1940
- Founder: Stan Boyett, Carol Boyett
- Headquarters: Modesto, California
- Key people: Carl Boyett (CEO, Owner); Dale Boyett (President, Owner); Carole Boyett (Owner); John Kruse (CFO); Katie Hollowell (Chief Legal Officer); Ken Berns (VP of Wholesale); Clark Nakamura (VP of Distribution); Scott Castle (President)
- Website: boyett.net

Boyett Petroleum is a family-owned, independent fuel supplier, distributor, and retailer based in Modesto, California. The company sells gas under the Boyett Petroleum, Cruisers and Kwik Serv brands, distributes to over 500 gas stations in California and Nevada, and supplies diesel directly to a large segment of California’s agricultural community. It was founded in 1940 by Stan Boyett.

== History ==
Stan and Carol Boyett both began their careers in the oil industry, Stan with Shell Oil and Carol with Standard Oil of California. The couple married in 1935. Stan founded Boyett Petroleum in 1940 and following World War II the couple became partners in several local gas stations serving the Modesto, Manteca and Atwater area. In the 1950s the family partnered with Walter Barbour to form a chain of Barbour Premium Gas stations. In 1962 the Boyetts bought Richfield Oil distributorship, also in Modesto. In 1970 Stan and Carol’s son, Carl Boyett, joined the family business. In the decades that followed the company continued to expand, mostly through organic growth, distributing gas for Valero, 76, ConocoPhillips and ARCO, and by the 1980s Boyett Petroleum was operating ten retail stations from San Jose to Reno and Modesto to Santa Rosa. In 1985 Stan and Carol Boyett retired and Carl took over as CEO. In 1993 Carl’s son, Dale Boyett, joined the company and in 2004 he assumed day-to-day responsibility for operating the company as President.

In 2008, Boyett Petroleum acquired wholesale distributor Toms Sierra Company. After the deal Boyett Petroleum had 110 branded accounts and was marketing over 20 million gallons of gas a month. In 2011, the company introduced the CRUISE Americard, a universal fleet fueling card, which is accepted at over 230,000 service and fuel locations nationwide. They also own and operate eight Cruiser convenience stores serving the Central Valley. In 2015, the company purchased fuel distribution contracts for ninety Valero and 76 gas stations from MCW Energy group. The deal grew its network to more than 500 stations in California and Nevada and increased sales to 400 million gallons of gas per year. Boyett Petroleum is the largest distributor of Valero on the West Coast.

In 2019, the company announced its new branding deal, that will see 10 of its retail stations in the Modesto metropolitan area being renamed from "Cruisers, Cruise In, Cruise Out" to 76®. the rebrand was set to take place in the fourth quarter of 2019.

The company remains based in Modesto, California and currently employs approximately 170 people.

== Charity ==
In 2009 the Boyett Family founded the Make Dreams Real Endowment Fund to provide support for children’s programs in Stanislaus County. Boyett Petroleum underwrites an annual golf tournament and all proceeds go to the fund. Ten percent of the fund’s balance is awarded annually to various programs, including Foothill Horizons Outdoor Education Camp for local school districts, Oakdale Education Foundation, Modesto Symphony Orchestra and more. Since its inception the fund has raised more than 1.1 million dollars. B Green Collection Events are quarterly events where customers bring in recyclable items and the value of the donated items is matched by Boyett dollar-for-dollar with all proceeds benefitting the City of Modesto Parks. The project earned the company a Captain Planet Foundation Outlook Leadership 2011 Award for Environmental Stewardship. In 2015, Wesson Ranch Park in Modesto was remodeled with funding from these events. Boyett Petroleum is also a key sponsor of the Gallo Center for the Arts.
