= Jobber (fuel) =

A jobber, or petroleum marketer, is a person or company that purchases quantities of refined fuel from refining companies (e.g., BP, Shell, Exxon), either for sale to retailers (e.g., gasoline stations), or to sell directly to the users of those products (e.g., home heating oil to homeowners, lubricating oils to industrial operations or repair shops, jet fuel to FBOs, etc.). In essence, the jobber acts as the "middleman" between the company that refines the petroleum products and those that use them or market them at retail prices. The jobber often owns the gasoline being sold, and the station it is being sold to, but allows an operator to lease the store.

In 2001, 44.3% of all gasoline in the United States was sold through jobbers. Approximately the same percentage was sold through integrated oil company-owned and operated stores or franchise arrangements. The percentage of jobbers responsible for fuel sale in the US in 2004 fell to 37.3%.

Jobbers are represented by trade associations such as the Association for Convenience & Fuel Retailing, National Association of Shell Marketers, Sigma: America's Leading Fuel Marketers, and the Petroleum Marketers Association of America.
