= Adam Smith Foundation =

American advocacy organization

- Founded: February 21, 2007
- Headquarters: Jefferson City, Missouri, U.S.
- Key people: Buddy Hardin, (President); Joseph Pandrom (secretary); Victor Gunn (treasurer)
- Revenue: ▲US$61,750 (2016); ▼US$43,150 (2017); ▲US$66,000 (2018); ▼US$6,000 (2019)

The Adam Smith Foundation is a 501(c)(4) conservative advocacy organization in Jefferson City, Missouri. The foundation was formed to promote conservative principles and peoples liberties all while going through public communication and a grassroots mobilization.

The Adam Smith Foundation was formed as a nonprofit corporation in the State of Missouri on February 21, 2007. Jo Mannies, in a blog entry in the St. Louis Post Dispatch, noted that the organization was founded by a group of Missouri Republican activists.

The President of the Adam Smith Foundation is William Clark "Buddy" Hardin IV of St. Charles, Missouri.

== History ==
=== Founding ===
In 2007, it received its exempt organization status from the IRS and now brings in $348,750 in annual income that focuses on the issues of right to work, education reform, balanced budget amendment, judicial reform, and tax reform.

=== Judicial Reform ===
The Adam Smith Foundation opposes the process by which Missouri's appellate judges are appointed, believing it gives too much influence to plaintiffs' attorneys. This process is known as the "Missouri Nonpartisan Court Plan," and the Missouri Plan. Shortly after its launch the Foundation sponsored a series of radio ads and billboards critical of the Missouri Plan method for the nonpartisan selection of judges.

=== Right to Work ===
The Adam Smith Foundation supports "Right to Work," the principle that employees should not be forced to join unions or to pay union dues.

=== Tax Reform ===
The Adam Smith Foundation believes in low taxes and making sure that the government lives within its means. In an Op-Ed piece published in the Southeast Missourian, John Elliott, the President of the Adam Smith Foundation, argued that the recent state surplus should be given back to the public either through tax cuts or through a large refund. In an op-ed printed in the St. Louis Business Journal, former Foundation Secretary Tom Shupe Jr. argued that the earnings tax levied in the cities of St. Louis and Kansas City should be repealed, writing, "I think it is time we get rid of the unnecessary burden of an earnings tax and get our state back on the track to prosperity."

=== Education Reform ===
The Adam Smith Foundation supports efforts to expand school choice, the concept of providing tax credits as a means of improving education opportunities to students.

=== Smaller Government ===
One of the Foundation's stated goals is to promote smaller government, noting that they "will push for efforts to rein in regulatory growth and fight government overreach."

In 2009, the Foundation stood against the Affordable Care Act and instead advocated for a market-based approach to healthcare reform. The organization's former Secretary, Tom Shupe, wrote, "Why not focus on making the existing system better by letting doctors and other health care professionals, not politicians, tell us what works?"

In 2010, the Foundation attracted attention by contributing nearly half a million dollars to California's Proposition 23 effort, which would have suspended stricter greenhouse gas emissions standards until California's unemployment rate dropped below 5.5% for a full year. The Foundation's Executive Director said that the Foundation contributed to the effort over fears that stricter air quality standards in California would affect Missouri, remarking, "Craziness out in California will have an impact here in Missouri."

In 2013, the Foundation was opposed to efforts that would have changed franchise law in Missouri to protect one company's market share.

== Criticism ==
=== Involvement with California's Proposition 23 ===
The Adam Smith Foundation's contribution of $498,000 in support of California's Proposition 23 led to questions from members of the press. Columnist Michael Hiltzik of The Los Angeles Times interviewed both Foundation president John Elliott and its executive director, James Harris, regarding the contributions, writing, "Harris and Elliott both went out of their way, curiously, to mention the effect environmental regulations have on coal. 'Anything to do with energy affects Missouri, No. 1 because we rely heavily on coal,' Elliott said. Harris observed, 'We in Missouri generate 80% of our electricity from coal.'" SFGate published a similar story questioning the contribution, writing that the organization's then-President "said the money came from about 10 individuals and described them as 'an alliance of like-minded individuals who had this issue as an interest.'"

=== Fight against the Missouri Plan ===
In 2007, the Springfield News-Leader ran a column accusing the foundation of engaging in a misleading billboard campaign regarding their perception that use of the Missouri Plan had allowed for the appointment of "activist judges." The column noted that the billboards prompted between 25 and 40 calls to a Springfield attorney who is a member of the state's Appellate Judicial Commission, which is in charge of choosing nominees for the state's Supreme Court and appellate courts.
