= Republican Study Committee =

Caucus in the US Congress

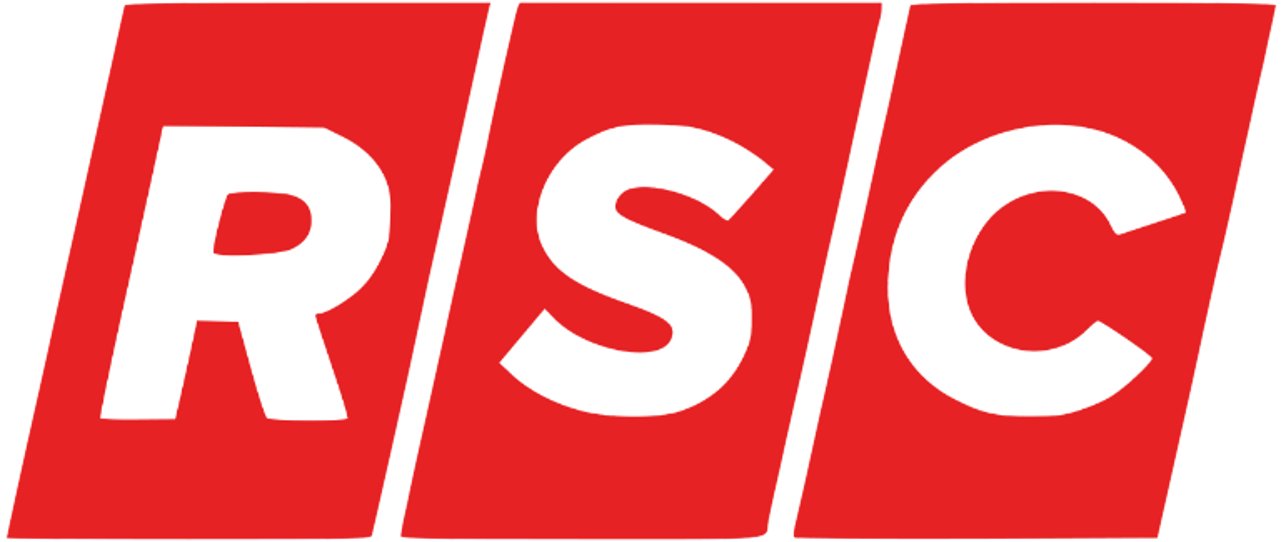
- Chair: August Pfluger (TX–11)
- Founded: 1973; 53 years ago
- Ideology: Conservatism
- Political position: Right-wing
- National affiliation: Republican Party
- Colors: Red
- Seats in the House Republican Conference: 188 / 219 (Note: This figure does not include James Moylan, a non-voting Delegate who is a member of the caucus.)
- Seats in the House: 188 / 435

Website
- rsc-pfluger.house.gov

The Republican Study Committee (RSC) is a congressional caucus of conservative members of the Republican Party in the United States House of Representatives. In November 2024, Representative August Pfluger was elected as the chair of the RSC, effective as of January 2025.

Although the primary functions of the RSC vary from year to year, it has always pushed for significant cuts in non-defense spending, advocated socially conservative legislation, and supported the right to keep and bear arms. It has proposed an alternative budget every year since 1995. In 2007, in conjunction with the unveiling of its "Taxpayer Bill of Rights", it presented an alternative budget resolution that it claimed would balance the budget within five years without increasing income taxes.

Entering the 119th United States Congress, the RSC was the largest conservative caucus in Congress with 188 members, of which 25 members were also members of the Freedom Caucus and 25 are also members of the Republican Governance Group.

== Initiatives ==
The RSC's legislative initiatives are detailed in the American Taxpayer Bill of Rights, unveiled in March 2007.

1. Taxpayers have a right to have a federal government that does not grow beyond their ability to pay for it.
2. Taxpayers have a right to receive back each dollar that they entrust to the government for their retirement.
3. Taxpayers have a right to expect the government to balance the budget without having their taxes raised.
4. Taxpayers have a right to a simple, fair tax code that they can understand.

== History ==
The RSC was founded in 1973 by Paul Weyrich and other conservative activists to keep a watch on the House Republican leadership, which they saw as too moderate. Their formation mirrored the rise of the Democratic Study Group, a liberal force in the Democratic Caucus founded in 1959.

The group briefly dissolved in 1995 when Newt Gingrich abolished it and other similar groups after the Republicans won control of the House for the first time in 40 years. It was soon resurrected as the Conservative Action Team (CATs) by Dan Burton of Indiana (the last chair of the original RSC), Sam Johnson of Texas, John Doolittle of California and Ernest Istook of Oklahoma. These four founders alternated as chairs throughout the following two Congresses until David McIntosh of Indiana became chair in 1998. The group was restored to its original RSC name when John Shadegg became chair in 2001.

Paul Teller spent over ten years as Executive Director of RSC. He was fired in December 2013 by Steve Scalise for divulging member conversations. Teller had been working with two outside groups in opposition to a budget deal forged by Paul Ryan and Patty Murray.

=== Chairs ===
Start	End	Chair(s)	District
February 1973	October 1973	Ed Derwinski	IL-04
October 1973	February 19, 1974	Del Clawson	CA-33
February 19, 1974	January 3, 1975	LaMar Baker	TN-03
January 3, 1975	January 3, 1977	Marjorie Holt	MD-04
January 3, 1977	January 1978	Clair Burgener	CA-43
January 1978	January 3, 1979	Dave Treen	LA-03
January 3, 1979	January 1980	Dick Schulze	PA-05
January 1980	January 3, 1981	John Rousselot	CA-26
January 3, 1981	January 3, 1983	Dick Schulze	PA-05
January 3, 1983	January 3, 1989	Phil Crane	IL-12
January 3, 1989	January 3, 1993	Tom DeLay	TX-22
January 3, 1993	January 3, 1995	Dan Burton	IN-06
March 1995	January 3, 1999	Dan Burton	IN-06
March 1995	January 3, 1999	John Doolittle	CA-04
March 1995	January 3, 1999	Ernest Istook	OK-05
March 1995	January 3, 1999	Sam Johnson	TX-03
January 3, 1999	January 3, 2000	David McIntosh	IN-02
January 3, 2000	January 3, 2001	Sam Johnson	TX-03
January 3, 2001	January 3, 2003	John Shadegg	AZ-04
January 3, 2003	January 3, 2005	Sue Myrick	NC-09
January 3, 2005	January 3, 2007	Mike Pence	IN-06
January 3, 2007	January 3, 2009	Jeb Hensarling	TX-05
January 3, 2009	January 3, 2011	Tom Price	GA-06
January 3, 2011	January 3, 2013	Jim Jordan	OH-04
January 3, 2013	January 3, 2014	Steve Scalise	LA-01
January 3, 2014	January 3, 2015	Rob Woodall	GA-07
January 3, 2015	January 3, 2017	Bill Flores	TX-17
January 3, 2017	January 3, 2019	Mark Walker	NC-06
January 3, 2019	January 3, 2021	Mike Johnson	LA-04
January 3, 2021	January 3, 2023	Jim Banks	IN-03
January 3, 2023	January 3, 2025	Kevin Hern	OK-01
January 3, 2025	January 3, 2027	August Pfluger	TX-11
January 3, 2027	Designate	Ben Cline	VA-06

== Former members ==
The RSC membership list was available on the group's website until 2025. It counted former vice presidents Mike Pence, Dan Quayle and Dick Cheney and former House majority leader Tom DeLay among its former members. In addition, at least two sitting senators—John Boozman (AR) and Roger Wicker (MS)—were members of the RSC while serving in the House. At least three former governors–Pence (IN), Butch Otter (ID), and Bobby Jindal (LA)—were also members.

=== List of former members ===
- Dan Burton of Indiana
- Phil Crane of Illinois
- John Doolittle of California
- Sam Johnson of Texas
- David M. McIntosh of Indiana
- Sue Myrick of North Carolina
- Mike Pence of Indiana
- Bruce Poliquin of Maine
- Jeb Hensarling of Texas
- Tom Price of Georgia
- Jackie Walorski of Indiana
- Rob Woodall of Georgia
- Bill Flores of Texas
- Mark Walker of North Carolina
- Jim Hagedorn of Minnesota
- Chris Stewart of Utah
- Pat Toomey of Pennsylvania
- Richard Burr of North Carolina
- Ken Buck of Colorado
- John Joyce of Pennsylvania

== Political issues ==
On June 16, 2010, the committee issued a press release critical of the administration of U.S. President Barack Obama for negotiating an agreement with energy company BP to waive the $75 million federal limit on oil company liability for oil spills. The statement called the agreement requiring BP to set aside $20 billion to pay damage claims for the Deepwater Horizon oil spill a "Chicago-style political shakedown" by the White House.

In July 2013, the Republican Study Committee barred the Heritage Foundation employees from attending its weekly meeting in the Capitol, reversing a decades-old policy, over disagreements about the farm bill.

In June 2015, the Republican Study Committee reacted to the Supreme Court's Obergefell v. Hodges ruling that the U.S. Constitution guaranteed the right to marry to same-sex couples, calling it "a loss for democratic self-government" and stating "we should work to promote the truth of marriage between a man and a woman."

In 2021, their policy positions included maintaining the Hyde Amendment, constructing a wall on the southern border, and ending perceived censorship of conservative-leaning content.

In 2026, the Republican Study Committee unveiled its framework for a second reconciliation bill (following the One Big Beautiful Bill Act in 2024) with the stated goal of making the American Dream affordable again. It argues that three things are pricing families out of the American Dream: housing costs, healthcare costs, and energy costs; it claimed its blueprint provides solutions for all three.

== Membership ==
Republican Study Committee in the 118th United States Congress

=== Current members ===
Since January 25th, 2025, the Republican Study Committee has not published its membership roster on its website. In May 2025, the caucus had 189 members in total. Currently, at least 22 members are also members of the Freedom Caucus.

Alabama

- Barry Moore (AL-1)*
- Mike Rogers (AL-3)
- Robert Aderholt (AL-4)
- Dale Strong (AL-5)
- Gary Palmer (AL-6)*

Arizona

- David Schweikert (AZ-1)
- Juan Ciscomani (AZ-6)
- Paul Gosar (AZ-9)*

Arkansas

- French Hill (AR-2)
- Bruce Westerman (AR-4)

California

- Kevin Kiley (CA-3)
- Tom McClintock (CA-5)
- Jay Obernolte (CA-23)
- Darrell Issa (CA-48)

Colorado

- Lauren Boebert (CO-4)*

Florida

- Neal Dunn (FL-2)
- Kat Cammack (FL-3)
- Aaron Bean (FL-4)
- Cory Mills (FL-7)
- Daniel Webster (FL-11)
- Gus Bilirakis (FL-12)
- Anna Paulina Luna (FL-13)*
- Laurel Lee (FL-15)
- Vern Buchanan (FL-16)
- Greg Steube (FL-17)
- Scott Franklin (FL-18)
- Byron Donalds (FL-19)*
- Brian Mast (FL-21)
- Carlos A. Giménez (FL-28)

Georgia

- Buddy Carter (GA-1)
- Rich McCormick (GA-7)
- Austin Scott (GA-8)
- Andrew Clyde (GA-9)*
- Mike Collins (GA-10)*
- Barry Loudermilk (GA-11)
- Rick Allen (GA-12)

Idaho

- Russ Fulcher (ID-1)*

Illinois

- Mike Bost (IL-12)
- Mary Miller (IL-15)*
- Darin LaHood (IL-16)

Indiana

- Rudy Yakym (IN-2)
- Jim Baird (IN-4)
- Victoria Spartz (IN-5)
- Erin Houchin (IN-9)

Iowa

- Ashley Hinson (IA-2)
- Zach Nunn (IA-3)
- Randy Feenstra (IA-4)

Kansas

- Tracey Mann (KS-1)
- Ron Estes (KS-4)

Kentucky

- James Comer (KY-1)
- Brett Guthrie (KY-2)
- Andy Barr (KY-6)

Louisiana

- Steve Scalise (LA-1)
- Clay Higgins (LA-3)*
- Mike Johnson (LA-4)
- Julia Letlow (LA-5)

Michigan

- Jack Bergman (MI-1)
- John Moolenaar (MI-2)
- Bill Huizenga (MI-4)
- Tim Walberg (MI-5)
- Lisa McClain (MI-9)
- John James (MI-10)

Minnesota

- Brad Finstad (MN-1)
- Tom Emmer (MN-6)
- Michelle Fischbach (MN-7)
- Pete Stauber (MN-8)

Mississippi

- Trent Kelly (MS-1)
- Michael Guest (MS-3)
- Mike Ezell (MS-4)

Missouri

- Ann Wagner (MO-2)
- Mark Alford (MO-4)
- Eric Burlison (MO-7)*
- Jason Smith (MO-8)

Montana

- Ryan Zinke (MT-1)

Nebraska

- Mike Flood (NE-1)
- Don Bacon (NE-2)
- Adrian Smith (NE-3)

New Jersey

- Jeff Van Drew (NJ-2)
- Chris Smith (NJ-4)

New York

- Nick LaLota (NY-1)
- Nicole Malliotakis (NY-11)
- Elise Stefanik (NY-21)
- Nick Langworthy (NY-23)
- Claudia Tenney (NY-24)

North Carolina

- Greg Murphy (NC-3)
- Virginia Foxx (NC-5)
- David Rouzer (NC-7)
- Mark Harris (NC-8)*
- Richard Hudson (NC-9)
- Chuck Edwards (NC-11)

Ohio

- Bob Latta (OH-5)
- Max Miller (OH-7)
- Warren Davidson (OH-8)*
- Mike Turner (OH-10)
- Troy Balderson (OH-12)
- Mike Carey (OH-15)

Oklahoma

- Kevin Hern (OK-1)
- Josh Brecheen (OK-2)*
- Tom Cole (OK-4)
- Stephanie Bice (OK-5)

Oregon

- Cliff Bentz (OR-2)

Pennsylvania

- Dan Meuser (PA-9)
- Lloyd Smucker (PA-11)
- Guy Reschenthaler (PA-14)
- Mike Kelly (PA-16)

South Carolina

- Joe Wilson (SC-2)
- William Timmons (SC-4)
- Ralph Norman (SC-5)*
- Russell Fry (SC-7)

South Dakota

- Dusty Johnson (SD-AL)

Tennessee

- Diana Harshbarger (TN-1)*
- Tim Burchett (TN-2)
- Chuck Fleischmann (TN-3)
- Scott DesJarlais (TN-4)*
- Andy Ogles (TN-5)*
- John Rose (TN-6)
- Matt Van Epps (TN-7)
- David Kustoff (TN-8)

Texas

- Nathaniel Moran (TX-1)
- Dan Crenshaw (TX-2)
- Keith Self (TX-3)
- Pat Fallon (TX-4)
- Lance Gooden (TX-5)
- Jake Ellzey (TX-6)
- Morgan Luttrell (TX-8)
- Michael McCaul (TX-10)
- August Pfluger (TX-11)
- Ronny Jackson (TX-13)
- Randy Weber (TX-14)
- Monica de la Cruz (TX-15)
- Pete Sessions (TX-17)
- Jodey Arrington (TX-19)
- Chip Roy (TX-21)
- Troy Nehls (TX-22)
- Beth Van Duyne (TX-24)
- Roger Williams (TX-25)
- Michael Cloud (TX-27)*
- John Carter (TX-31)
- Brian Babin (TX-36)

Utah

- Blake Moore (UT-1)
- Burgess Owens (UT-4)

Virginia

- Rob Wittman (VA-1)
- Ben Cline (VA-6)*

Washington

- Dan Newhouse (WA-4)

Wisconsin

- Bryan Steil (WI-1)
- Scott L. Fitzgerald (WI-5)
- Glenn Grothman (WI-6)
- Tom Tiffany (WI-7)*

Wyoming

- Harriet Hageman (WY-AL)

Non-voting members

- James Moylan (GU-AL)

*Also a member of the Freedom Caucus.

== See also ==
- Congressional Progressive Caucus
- Freedom Caucus
- Liberty Caucus
- Republican Main Street Partnership
- Tea Party Caucus
- Tuesday Group
