= Jayapal =

Jayapal is a surname of Indian origin. Notable people with the surname include:

- K. A. Jayapal (born 1955), Indian politician
- Maya Jayapal (born 1941), Indian author
- Pramila Jayapal (born 1965), American politician
- Puttarangaiah Jayapal (born 1972), Indian cricket umpire
- Susheela Jayapal (born 1962), American politician
- Vijay Jayapal, Indian director
