= List of new members of the 117th United States Congress =

The 117th United States Congress began on January 3, 2021. There were six new senators (two Democrats, four Republicans) and 60 new representatives (15 Democrats, 45 Republicans) at the start of the first session. Additionally, three senators (all Democrats) and 16 representatives (six Democrats, ten Republicans) took office on various dates in order to fill vacancies during the 117th Congress before it ended on January 3, 2023.

One representative-elect, Luke Letlow of Louisiana, died before taking office.

The president of the House Democratic freshman class was Nikema Williams of Georgia, while the president of the House Republican freshman class was Stephanie Bice of Oklahoma. Additionally, the Democratic Freshmen Leadership Representative was Mondaire Jones of New York, and the Republican's freshmen liaison was Andrew Clyde of Georgia.

== Senate ==
=== Took office January 3, 2021 ===
State	Image	Senator	Seniority	Switched party	Prior background	Birth year	Ref
Alabama		Tommy Tuberville (R)	6th (99th overall)	Yes; Defeated Doug Jones (D)	College football coach	1954	
Colorado		John Hickenlooper (D)	4th (97th overall)	Yes; Defeated Cory Gardner (R)	Governor of Colorado; Mayor of Denver	1952	
Kansas		Roger Marshall (R)	3rd (96th overall)	No; Open seat; replaced Pat Roberts (R)	U.S. House of Representatives (Note: Elected to the 115th Congress, serving from 2017 to 2021 in Kansas's 1st district.); Obstetrician; U.S. Army Reserve Captain	1960	
New Mexico		Ben Ray Luján (D)	1st (94th overall)	No; Open seat; replaced Tom Udall (D)	U.S. House of Representatives (Note: Elected to the 111th Congress, serving from 2009 to 2021 in New Mexico's 3rd district.); New Mexico Public Regulation Commission	1972	
Tennessee		Bill Hagerty (R)	5th (98th overall)	No; Open seat; replaced Lamar Alexander (R)	U.S. Ambassador to Japan; Tennessee Commissioner of Economic Development; Advisor to President George H. W. Bush	1959	
Wyoming		Cynthia Lummis (R)	2nd (95th overall)	No; Open seat; replaced Mike Enzi (R)	U.S. House of Representatives (Note: Elected to the 111th Congress, serving from 2009 to 2017 in Wyoming's at-large district.); Treasurer of Wyoming; Wyoming Senate; Wyoming House of Representatives	1954	

=== Took office during the 117th Congress ===
State	Image	Senator	Took office	Switched party	Prior background	Birth year	Ref
California		Alex Padilla (D)	January 20, 2021	No; Appointed; replaced Kamala Harris (D)	Secretary of State of California; California State Senate; President of the Los Angeles City Council	1973	
Georgia (Class 2)		Jon Ossoff (D)	January 20, 2021 (Note: Ossoff and Warnock were duely elected in January 2021 following a runoff, but chose to delay the start of their services in the Senate when Vice President Kamala Harris empowered to act as tie-breaker.)	Yes; Defeated David Perdue (R)	Investigative journalist	1987	
Georgia (Class 3)		Raphael Warnock (D)	January 20, 2021	Yes; Defeated Kelly Loeffler (R)	Senior pastor of Ebenezer Baptist Church	1969	

== House of Representatives ==
=== Took office January 3, 2021 ===
District	Image	Representative	Switched party	Prior background	Birth year	Ref
Alabama 1		Jerry Carl (R)	No; Open seat; replaced Bradley Byrne (R)	President of the Mobile County Commission	1958	
Alabama 2		Barry Moore (R)	No; Open seat; replaced Martha Roby (R)	Alabama House of Representatives	1966	
California 8		Jay Obernolte (R)	No; Open seat; replaced Paul Cook (R)	California State Assembly; President of FarSight Studios	1970	
California 21		David Valadao (R)	Yes; Defeated TJ Cox (D)	U.S. House of Representatives (Note: Previously elected to the 113th Congress, serving from 2013 to 2019.); California State Assembly	1977	
California 39		Young Kim (R)	Yes; Defeated Gil Cisneros (D)	California State Assembly	1962	
California 48		Michelle Steel (R)	Yes; Defeated Harley Rouda (D)	Chair of the Orange County Board of Supervisors; California State Board of Equalization	1955	
California 50		Darrell Issa (R)	No; Open seat; replaced Duncan D. Hunter (R)	U.S. House of Representatives (Note: Previously elected to the 107th Congress in California's 48th district, serving from 2001 to 2019.); CEO of Directed Electronics; U.S. Army Captain	1953	
California 53		Sara Jacobs (D)	No; Open seat; replaced Susan Davis (D)	Contractor	1989	
Colorado 3		Lauren Boebert (R)	No; Defeated Scott Tipton (R) in a primary	Business owner	1986	
Florida 3		Kat Cammack (R)	No; Open seat; replaced Ted Yoho (R)	Advisor to Representative Ted Yoho	1988	
Florida 15		Scott Franklin (R)	No; Defeated Ross Spano (R) in a primary	Lakeland City Commission; U.S. Navy Commander	1964	
Florida 19		Byron Donalds (R)	No; Open seat; replaced Francis Rooney (R)	Florida House of Representatives	1978	
Florida 26		Carlos A. Giménez (R)	Yes; Defeated Debbie Mucarsel-Powell (D)	Mayor of Miami-Dade County; Miami-Dade County Commission; City Manager of Miami; Miami Fire-Rescue Department	1954	
Florida 27		María Elvira Salazar (R)	Yes; Defeated Donna Shalala (D)	Television news anchor	1961	
Georgia 5		Nikema Williams (D)	No; Open seat; replaced Kwanza Hall (D) (Note: Elected in the special election to replace John Lewis after a December 1, 2020 runoff.)	Chair of the Democratic Party of Georgia; Georgia State Senate	1978	
Georgia 7		Carolyn Bourdeaux (D)	Yes; Open seat; replaced Rob Woodall (R)	Professor	1970	
Georgia 9		Andrew Clyde (R)	No; Open seat; replaced Doug Collins (R)	Business owner U.S. Navy Commander	1963	
Georgia 14		Marjorie Taylor Greene (R)	No; Open seat; replaced Tom Graves (R)	Businesswoman	1974	
Hawaii 2		Kai Kahele (D)	No; Open seat; replaced Tulsi Gabbard (D)	Hawaii Senate; U.S. Air Force Lieutenant Colonel	1974	
Illinois 3		Marie Newman (D)	No; Defeated Dan Lipinski (D) in a primary	Marketing consultant	1964	
Illinois 15		Mary Miller (R)	No; Open seat; replaced John Shimkus (R)	Farmer	1959	
Indiana 1		Frank J. Mrvan (D)	No; Open seat; replaced Pete Visclosky (D)	North Township Trustee	1969	
Indiana 5		Victoria Spartz (R)	No; Open seat; replaced Susan Brooks (R)	Indiana Senate	1978	
Iowa 1		Ashley Hinson (R)	Yes; Defeated Abby Finkenauer (D)	Iowa House of Representatives	1983	
Iowa 2		Mariannette Miller-Meeks (R)	Yes; Open seat; replaced Dave Loebsack (D)	Iowa Senate; Iowa Director of Public Health	1955	
Iowa 4		Randy Feenstra (R)	No; Defeated Steve King (R) in a primary	Iowa Senate; Sioux County Treasurer	1969	
Kansas 1		Tracey Mann (R)	No; Open seat; replaced Roger Marshall (R)	Lieutenant Governor of Kansas	1976	
Kansas 2		Jake LaTurner (R)	No; Defeated Steve Watkins (R) in a primary	Kansas State Treasurer; Kansas Senate	1988	
Massachusetts 4		Jake Auchincloss (D)	No; Open seat; replaced Joe Kennedy III (D)	Newton City Council; U.S. Marine Corps Major	1988	
Michigan 3		Peter Meijer (R)	Yes; Open seat; replaced Justin Amash (L)	Business analyst U.S. Army Sergeant	1988	
Michigan 10		Lisa McClain (R)	No (Note: Mitchell left the Republican Party in December 2020, before he left Congress but after McClain was elected.); Open seat; replaced Paul Mitchell (R)	Finance executive	1966	
Minnesota 7		Michelle Fischbach (R)	Yes; Defeated Collin Peterson (DFL)	Lieutenant Governor of Minnesota; President of the Minnesota Senate; Paynesville City Council	1965	
Missouri 1		Cori Bush (D)	No; Defeated Lacy Clay (D) in a primary	Black Lives Matter activist	1976	
Montana at-large		Matt Rosendale (R)	No; Open seat; replaced Greg Gianforte (R)	Montana State Auditor; Montana Senate; Montana House of Representatives	1960	
New Mexico 2		Yvette Herrell (R)	Yes; Defeated Xochitl Torres Small (D)	New Mexico House of Representatives	1964	
New Mexico 3		Teresa Leger Fernandez (D)	No; Open seat; replaced Ben Ray Luján (D)	Attorney	1959	
New York 2		Andrew Garbarino (R)	No; Open seat; replaced Peter King (R)	New York State Assembly	1984	
New York 11		Nicole Malliotakis (R)	Yes; Defeated Max Rose (D)	New York State Assembly	1980	
New York 15		Ritchie Torres (D)	No; Open seat; replaced José E. Serrano (D)	New York City Council	1988	
New York 16		Jamaal Bowman (D)	No; Defeated Eliot Engel (D) in a primary	Educator	1976	
New York 17		Mondaire Jones (D)	No; Open seat; replaced Nita Lowey (D)	Lawyer	1987	
North Carolina 2		Deborah K. Ross (D)	Yes; Open seat; replaced George Holding (R)	North Carolina House of Representatives	1963	
North Carolina 6		Kathy Manning (D)	Yes; Open seat; replaced Mark Walker (R)	Lawyer	1956	
North Carolina 11		Madison Cawthorn (R)	No; Open seat; replaced Mark Meadows (R)	Staffer for Representative Mark Meadows	1995	
Oklahoma 5		Stephanie Bice (R)	Yes; Defeated Kendra Horn (D)	Oklahoma Senate	1973	
Oregon 2		Cliff Bentz (R)	No; Open seat; replaced Greg Walden (R)	Oregon State Senate; Oregon House of Representatives	1952	
South Carolina 1		Nancy Mace (R)	Yes; Defeated Joe Cunningham (D)	South Carolina House of Representatives	1977	
Tennessee 1		Diana Harshbarger (R)	No; Open seat; replaced Phil Roe (R)	Pharmacist	1960	
Texas 4		Pat Fallon (R)	No; Open seat; replaced John Ratcliffe (R)	Texas Senate; Texas House of Representatives; U.S. Air Force Captain	1967	
Texas 11		August Pfluger (R)	No; Open seat; replaced Mike Conaway (R)	U.S. National Security Council; U.S. Air Force Colonel	1978	
Texas 13		Ronny Jackson (R)	No; Open seat; replaced Mac Thornberry (R)	Chief Medical Advisor to the President; Physician to the President; U.S. Navy Medical Corps	1967	
Texas 17		Pete Sessions (R)	No; Open seat; replaced Bill Flores (R)	U.S. House of Representatives (Note: Previously elected to the 105th Congress in Texas's 5th district, serving from 1997 to 2019.)	1955	
Texas 22		Troy Nehls (R)	No; Open seat; replaced Pete Olson (R)	Fort Bend County Sheriff; U.S. Army Major	1968	
Texas 23		Tony Gonzales (R)	No; Open seat; replaced Will Hurd (R)	U.S. Navy Master Chief Petty Officer	1980	
Texas 24		Beth Van Duyne (R)	No; Open seat; replaced Kenny Marchant (R)	U.S. HUD Department official Mayor of Irving; Irving City Council	1970	
Utah 1		Blake Moore (R)	No; Open seat; replaced Rob Bishop (R)	U.S. Foreign Service	1980	
Utah 4		Burgess Owens (R)	Yes; Defeated Ben McAdams (D)	Nonprofit executive Professional football player	1951	
Virginia 5		Bob Good (R)	No; Defeated Denver Riggleman (R) in a primary	Campbell County Board of Supervisors	1965	
Washington 10		Marilyn Strickland (D)	No; Open seat; replaced Denny Heck (D)	President of the Seattle Chamber of Commerce; Mayor of Tacoma; Tacoma City Council	1962	
Wisconsin 5		Scott L. Fitzgerald (R)	No; Open seat; replaced Jim Sensenbrenner (R)	Majority Leader of the Wisconsin Senate; U.S. Army Reserve Lieutenant Colonel	1963	

=== Took office during the 117th Congress ===
District	Image	Representative	Took office	Switched party	Prior background	Birth year	Ref
New York 22		Claudia Tenney (R)	February 11, 2021	Yes; Defeated Anthony Brindisi (D)	U.S. House of Representatives (Note: Previously elected to the 115th Congress, serving from 2017 to 2019.); New York State Assembly	1961	
Louisiana 5		Julia Letlow (R)	April 14, 2021	No; Succeeded Luke Letlow (R) (Note: Luke Letlow elected in the regular election to replace the retiring Ralph Abraham (R), having died from COVID-19 a week before he was set to take office.)	Academic administrator	1981	
Louisiana 2		Troy Carter (D)	May 11, 2021	No; Succeeded Cedric Richmond (D)	Minority Leader of the Louisiana State Senate; New Orleans City Council; Louisiana House of Representatives	1963	
New Mexico 1		Melanie Stansbury (D)	June 14, 2021	No; Succeeded Deb Haaland (D)	New Mexico House of Representatives	1979	
Texas 6		Jake Ellzey (R)	July 30, 2021	No; Succeeded Ron Wright (R)	Texas House of Representatives; U.S. Navy Commander	1970	
Ohio 11		Shontel Brown (D)	November 4, 2021	No; Succeeded Marcia Fudge (D)	Cuyahoga County Council	1975	
Ohio 15		Mike Carey (R)	November 4, 2021	No; Succeeded Steve Stivers (R)	Coal lobbyist Army National Guard	1971	
Florida 20		Sheila Cherfilus-McCormick (D)	January 18, 2022	No; Succeeded Alcee Hastings (D)	Healthcare executive	1979	
California 22		Connie Conway (R)	June 14, 2022	No; Succeeded Devin Nunes (R)	Minority Leader of the California State Assembly; Tulare County Board of Supervisors	1950	
Texas 34		Mayra Flores (R)	June 21, 2022	Yes; Succeeded Filemon Vela Jr. (D)	Respiratory therapist	1986	
Nebraska 1		Mike Flood (R)	July 12, 2022	No; Succeeded Jeff Fortenberry (R)	Speaker of the Nebraska Legislature	1975	
Minnesota 1		Brad Finstad (R)	August 12, 2022	No; Succeeded Jim Hagedorn (R)	USDA Rural Development Director for Minnesota; Minnesota House of Representatives	1976	
Alaska at-large		Mary Peltola (D)	September 13, 2022	Yes; Succeeded Don Young (R)	Orutsararmiut Native Council Tribal Court; Alaska House of Representatives; Bethel City Council	1973	
New York 19		Pat Ryan (D)	September 13, 2022	No; Succeeded Antonio Delgado (D)	Ulster County Executive; U.S. Army	1982	
New York 23		Joe Sempolinski (R)	September 13, 2022	No; Succeeded Tom Reed (R)	Chair of the Steuben County Republican Committee; Chief of staff to Assemblyman Joseph Giglio	1983	
Indiana 2		Rudy Yakym (R)	November 14, 2022	No; Succeeded Jackie Walorski (R)	Congressional staffer Businessman	1984	

== See also ==
- List of United States representatives in the 117th Congress
- List of United States senators in the 117th Congress

== Notes ==
Preceded by New members of the 116th Congress	New members of the 117th Congress; 2021–2023	Succeeded by New members of the 118th Congress
