= Jaipal =

Jaipal may refer to:

- Visnu, Hindu deity, also known as Jayapala/Jaipal
- Brahma, Hindu deity, sometimes known as Jayapala/Jaipal
- Jaipal Reddy (1942–2019), Indian politician and minister
- Jaipal Singh Jajji, Indian politician
- Jaipal Singh Munda or Jaipal Singh (1903–1970), Indian politician, writer, and sportsman, former Indian hockey captain
  - Jaipal Singh Stadium, multi-purpose stadium in Jharkhand, India
- Jaipal Singh (politician), Indian politician
- Jaipal Singh Law, Indian civil servant

== See also ==
- Jayapal, alternative form of the Indian male given name
- Jayapala, 10th-century founder of the Kabul/Hindu Shahi dynasty now in eastern Afghanistan and northwest Pakistan
- Jai Pal Mittal, Indian scientist
- Jai Pal Singh (born 1930), Indian physician and surgeon
