= List of members of the Congressional Progressive Caucus =

Below is a list of current and former members of the U.S. Congressional Progressive Caucus.

== Current Senate members ==
- Bernie Sanders (I-Vermont)

== Current House members ==
Arizona
- Yassamin Ansari (AZ-03, Phoenix)
- Adelita Grijalva (AZ-07, Tucson)

California

- Jared Huffman (CA-2, San Rafael)
- John Garamendi (CA-8, Walnut Grove)
- Mark DeSaulnier (CA-10, Concord)
- Lateefah Simon (CA-12, Emeryville)
- Kevin Mullin (CA-15, South San Francisco)
- Ro Khanna (CA-17, Fremont)
- Jimmy Panetta (CA-19, Carmel Valley)
- Judy Chu (CA-28, El Monte)
- Luz Rivas (CA-29, Los Angeles)
- Laura Friedman (CA-30, Glendale)
- Brad Sherman (CA-32, Sherman Oaks)
- Jimmy Gomez (CA-34, Los Angeles)
- Ted Lieu (CA-36, Los Angeles)
- Sydney Kamlager-Dove (CA-37, Los Angeles)
- Linda Sánchez (CA-38, Lakewood)
- Mark Takano (CA-39, Riverside)
- Robert Garcia (CA-42, Long Beach)
- Maxine Waters (CA-43, Inglewood)
- Nanette Barragán (CA-44, San Pedro)
- Dave Min (CA-47, Irvine)
- Mike Levin (CA-49, San Juan Capistrano)
- Sara Jacobs (CA-51, San Diego)
- Juan Vargas (CA-52, San Diego)

Colorado

- Diana DeGette (CO-1, Denver) (lost primary)
- Joe Neguse (CO-2, Boulder)

Connecticut

- Rosa DeLauro (CT-3, New Haven)

Delaware

- Sarah McBride (DE-AL, Wilmington)

Florida

- Darren Soto (FL-9, Orlando)
- Maxwell Frost (FL-10, Orlando)
- Frederica Wilson (FL-24, North Miami)

Georgia

- Hank Johnson (GA-4, Lithonia)
- Nikema Williams (GA-5, Atlanta)

Hawaii

- Jill Tokuda (HI-2, Kāneʻohe)

Illinois

- Jonathan Jackson (IL-1, Chicago)
- Delia Ramirez (IL-3, Chicago)
- Chuy García (IL-4, Chicago) (retiring at end of 119th Congress)
- Danny Davis (IL-7, Chicago)
- Jan Schakowsky (IL-9, Chicago) (retiring at end of 119th Congress)

Indiana

- André Carson (IN-7, Indianapolis)

Kentucky

- Morgan McGarvey (KY-3, Louisville)

Louisiana

- Troy Carter (LA-2, New Orleans)

Maine

- Chellie Pingree (ME-1, North Haven)

Maryland

- Kweisi Mfume (MD-7, Baltimore)
- Jamie Raskin (MD-8, Takoma Park)

Massachusetts

- Jim McGovern (MA-2, Worcester)
- Lori Trahan (MA-3, Westford)
- Ayanna Pressley (MA-7, Dorchester)

Michigan

- Debbie Dingell (MI-6, Ann Arbor)
- Rashida Tlaib (MI-12, Detroit)
- Shri Thanedar (MI-13, Detroit) (lost primary)

Minnesota

- Ilhan Omar (MN-5, Minneapolis)

Nevada

- Steven Horsford (NV-4, Las Vegas)

New Jersey

- Donald Norcross (NJ-1, Camden)
- Frank Pallone (NJ-6, Long Branch)
- Nellie Pou (NJ-09, North Haledon)
- LaMonica McIver (NJ-10, Newark)
- Analilia Mejia (NJ-11, Glen Ridge)
- Bonnie Watson Coleman (NJ-12, Trenton) (retiring at end of 119th Congress)

New Mexico

- Melanie Stansbury (NM-1, Albuquerque)
- Teresa Leger Fernandez (NM-3, Santa Fe)

New York

- Grace Meng (NY-6, Queens)
- Nydia Velázquez (NY-7, Brooklyn) (retiring at end of 119th Congress)
- Yvette Clarke (NY-9, Brooklyn)
- Dan Goldman (NY-10, Manhattan) (lost primary)
- Jerry Nadler (NY-12, Manhattan) (retiring at end of 119th Congress)
- Adriano Espaillat (NY-13, Manhattan) (lost primary)
- Alexandria Ocasio-Cortez (NY-14, Bronx)
- Paul Tonko (NY-20, Albany)

North Carolina

- Valerie Foushee (NC-4, Hillsborough)
- Alma Adams (NC-12, Charlotte)

Ohio

- Shontel Brown (OH-11, Warrensville Heights)

Oregon

- Suzanne Bonamici (OR-1, Beaverton)
- Maxine Dexter (OR-03, Portland)
- Val Hoyle (OR-4, Springfield)
- Andrea Salinas (OR-6, Tigard)

Pennsylvania

- Brendan Boyle (PA-2, Philadelphia)
- Dwight Evans (PA-3, Philadelphia) (retiring at end of 119th Congress)
- Madeleine Dean (PA-4, Abington Township)
- Mary Gay Scanlon (PA-5, Swarthmore)
- Summer Lee (PA-12, Swissvale)
- Chris Deluzio (PA-17, Fox Chapel)

Texas

- Veronica Escobar (TX-16, El Paso)
- Christian Menefee (TX-18, Houston)
- Joaquin Castro (TX-20, San Antonio)
- Jasmine Crockett (TX-30, Dallas) (ran for U.S. Senate)
- Greg Casar (TX-35, Austin)
- Lloyd Doggett (TX-37, Austin) (retiring at end of 119th Congress)

Vermont

- Becca Balint (VT at-Large)

Virginia

- Jennifer McClellan (VA-4, Richmond)
- Don Beyer (VA-8, Alexandria)

Washington

- Emily Randall (WA-6, Tacoma)
- Pramila Jayapal (WA-7, Seattle)
- Adam Smith (WA-9, Bellevue)

Wisconsin

- Mark Pocan (WI-2, Madison)
- Gwen Moore (WI-4, Milwaukee)

Non-voting

- Eleanor Holmes Norton (District of Columbia)

== Former members ==
There are a variety of reasons members have left the caucus:

=== Retirement, resignation, or death ===
- Earl Blumenauer (OR-3) – retired from Congress in 2024
- David Bonior (MI-12/10) – retired from Congress in 2002
- Roland Burris (IL Senate) – retired from Congress in 2010
- Julia Carson (IN-7) – died in 2007
- Sheila Cherfilus-McCormick (FL-20) – resigned from Congress in 2026
- Donna M. Christensen (Virgin Islands) – retired from Congress in 2014
- David Cicilline (RI-1) – retired from Congress in 2023
- John Conyers (MI-13) – resigned from Congress in 2017
- Elijah Cummings (MD-7) – died in 2019
- Peter DeFazio (OR-4) – retired from Congress in 2022
- Ron Dellums (CA-8/9) – resigned from Congress in 1998
- Lane Evans (IL-17) – retired from Congress in 2006
- Bob Filner (CA-51) – retired from Congress in 2012
- Barney Frank (MA-4) – retired from Congress in 2012
- Tulsi Gabbard (HI-2) – retired from Congress in 2020
- Raúl Grijalva (AZ-7) – died in 2025
- Luis Gutierrez (IL-4) – retired from Congress in 2018
- Katie Hill (CA-25) – resigned from Congress in 2019
- Maurice Hinchey (NY-22) – retired from Congress in 2012
- Rush Holt (NJ-12) – retired from Congress in 2014
- Jesse Jackson, Jr. (IL-2) – resigned from Congress in 2012
- Eddie Bernice Johnson (TX-30) – retired from Congress in 2022
- Kai Kahele (HI-2) – retired from Congress in 2022
- Ruben Kihuen (NV-4) – retired from Congress in 2018
- Brenda Lawrence (MI-14) – retired from Congress in 2022
- Sheila Jackson Lee (TX-18) – died in 2024
- John Lewis (GA-5) – died in 2020
- Dave Loebsack (IA-2) – retired from Congress in 2020
- Eric Massa (NY-29) – resigned from Congress in 2010
- Jim McDermott (WA-7) – retired from Congress in 2017
- Brad Miller (NC-13) – retired from Congress in 2012
- George Miller (CA-11) – retired from Congress in 2014
- Patsy Mink (HI-2) – died in 2002
- Jim Moran (VA-8) – retired from Congress in 2014
- Grace Napolitano (CA-31) – retired from Congress in 2024
- Rick Nolan (MN-8) – retired from Congress in 2018
- John Olver (MA-1) – retired from Congress in 2012
- Major Owens (NY-11) – retired from Congress in 2006
- Ed Pastor (AZ-7) – retired from Congress in 2014
- Carol Shea-Porter (NH-1) – retired from Congress in 2018
- José E. Serrano (NY-15) – retired from Congress in 2020
- Louise Slaughter (NY-25) – died in 2018
- Stephanie Tubbs Jones (OH-11) – died in 2008
- Henry Waxman (CA-33) – retired from Congress in 2014
- Paul Wellstone (MN Senate) – died in 2002
- Robert Wexler (FL-19) – resigned from Congress in 2010
- Lynn Woolsey (CA-6) – retired from Congress in 2012
- John Yarmuth (KY-3) – retired from Congress in 2022

=== Loss of congressional office ===
Congresspeople defeated in an election to Congress (for either their current or another seat), or who have otherwise been prevented from continuing to hold office in Congress (Note: A living congressperson's tenure in office can be cut short through non-electoral means explicitly beyond their control, such as by expulsion by their respective congressional house, or by committing an action that renders them ineligible for office under Section 3 of the Fourteenth Amendment to the U.S. Constitution; and this removal from office may either disallow them from resuming office (through either election or appointment) or simply discourage them from doing so. It has not as yet occurred that any congressperson has both, ever been a member of the Congressional Progressive Caucus, and ever been removed (not by election or their choice or their death) from Congress: thus there is no person whose cause for not being in the CPC is from such removal (which would anyway further require that the congressperson both: either never resume office or not (re)join the CPC upon or after resumption; and, had been in the CPC specifically at the time of such a removal, rather than either unrelatedly leaving before one or first joining only after a resumption).), are no longer members of congressional caucuses.

- Thomas Andrews (ME-1) – defeated in run for Senate in 1994
- Jamaal Bowman (NY-16) – defeated for re-nomination in 2024
- Cori Bush (MO-1) – defeated for re-nomination in 2024
- Mike Capuano (MA-7) – defeated for re-nomination in 2018 by current caucus member Ayanna Pressley
- Matt Cartwright (PA-8) – defeated for re-election in 2024
- Gil Cisneros (CA-39) – defeated for re-election in 2020
- Hansen Clarke (MI-13) – defeated for re-nomination in 2012
- Lacy Clay (MO-1) – defeated for re-nomination in 2020 by now-former caucus member Cori Bush
- Donna Edwards (MD-4) – defeated in run for Senate in 2016
- Chaka Fattah (PA-2) – defeated for re-nomination in 2016 by current caucus member Dwight Evans
- Russ Feingold (WI Senate) – defeated for re-election in 2010
- Alan Grayson (FL-8) (FL-9) – defeated in run for Senate in 2016
- John Hall (NY-19) – defeated for re-election in 2010
- Phil Hare (IL-17) – defeated for re-election in 2010
- Mike Honda (CA-17) – defeated for re-election in 2016 by current caucus member Ro Khanna
- Mondaire Jones (NY-17) – defeated for re-nomination due to redistricting in 2022
- Joe Kennedy III (MA-04) – defeated in run for Senate in 2020 (lost to incumbent Ed Markey)
- Carolyn Cheeks Kilpatrick (MI-13) – defeated for re-nomination in 2010
- Dennis Kucinich (OH-10) – defeated for re-nomination in 2012
- Barbara Lee (CA-12) – defeated in run for Senate in 2024
- Andy Levin (MI-9) – defeated for re-nomination in a 2022 redistricting race
- Carolyn Maloney (NY-12) – defeated for re-nomination in a 2022 redistricting race by current caucus member Jerry Nadler
- Cynthia McKinney (GA-4) – defeated for re-nomination in 2006 by current caucus member Hank Johnson
- Debbie Mucarsel-Powell (FL-26) – defeated for re-election in 2020
- Marie Newman (IL-3) – defeated for re-nomination in 2022
- Katie Porter (CA-47) – defeated in run for Senate in 2024
- Laura Richardson (CA-37) – defeated for re-election in 2012
- Pete Stark (CA-13) – defeated for re-election in 2012
- John Tierney (MA-6) – defeated for re-nomination in 2014
- Albert Wynn (MD-4) – defeated for re-nomination in 2008

=== Attainment of a higher position ===
Although the caucus has had membership from both houses of Congress, it has had much less presence in the Senate, and some representatives choose to leave the caucus when they become senators (or when seeking such office). Other representatives have left the caucus when joining House leadership. Members who have attained higher office outside of Congress, having left that body, are no longer in the caucus.

- Tammy Baldwin (WI-2) – elected to Senate in 2012
- Lisa Blunt Rochester (DE-AL) – elected to Senate in 2024
- Sherrod Brown (OH-13) – elected to Senate in 2006 (defeated for re-election in 2024)
- Katherine Clark (MA-5) – left caucus when elected Minority Whip
- Keith Ellison (MN-5) – elected Attorney General of Minnesota in 2018
- Marcia Fudge (OH-11) – became Secretary of Housing and Urban Development in 2021
- Ruben Gallego (AZ-3) – elected to Senate in 2024 (left caucus during campaign)
- Deb Haaland (NM-1) – became Secretary of the Interior in 2021
- Mazie Hirono (HI-2) – elected to Senate in 2012
- Hakeem Jeffries (NY-8) – left caucus when elected House Minority Leader
- Andy Kim (NJ-3) – elected to Senate in 2024
- Ed Markey (MA-5) – elected to Senate in 2013
- Nancy Pelosi (CA-8) – left caucus when elected House Minority Leader
- Jared Polis (CO-2) – elected Governor of Colorado in 2018
- Hilda Solis (CA-32) – became Secretary of Labor in 2009
- Peter Welch (VT at-Large) – elected to Senate in 2022

=== Other reasons or unknown ===
- Bob Brady (PA-1) – left caucus
- Emanuel Cleaver (MO-5) – left caucus
- Steve Cohen (TN-9) – left caucus
- Angie Craig (MN-2) – left caucus
- Lois Frankel (FL-22) – left caucus in 2023
- Sylvia Garcia (TX-29) – left caucus
- Dan Kildee (MI-5) – left caucus
- Zoe Lofgren (CA-18) – left caucus
- Joseph Morelle (NY-25) – left caucus
- Lucille Roybal-Allard (CA-40) – left caucus
- Bobby Rush (IL-1) – left caucus
- Bennie Thompson (MS-2) – left caucus
- Ritchie Torres (NY-15) – left caucus in 2024
