= Pramila Jayapal =

American politician (born 1965)

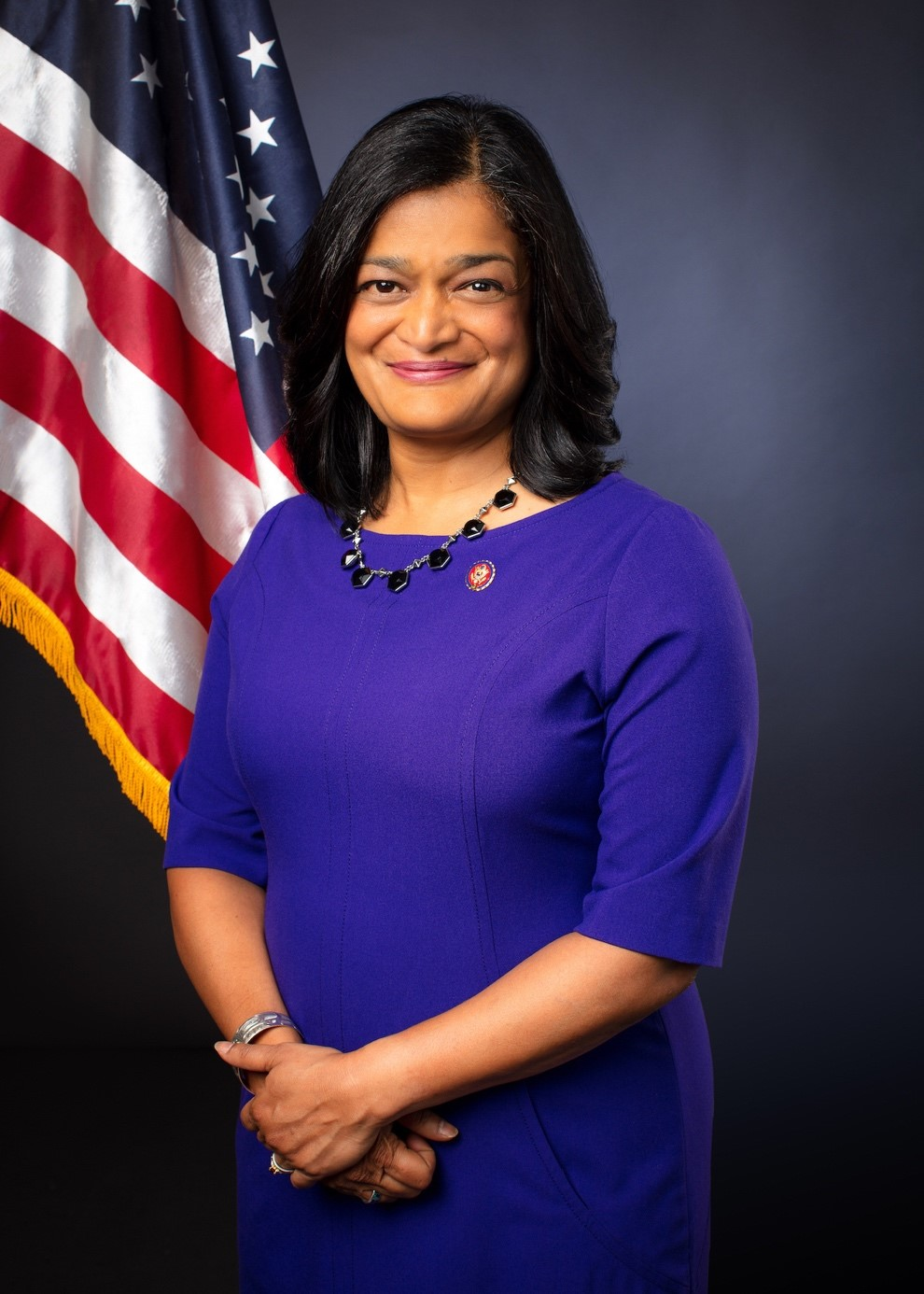
- Official portrait, 2019

Chair of the Congressional Progressive Caucus
- In office January 3, 2019 – January 3, 2025 Serving with Mark Pocan (2019–2021)
- Preceded by: Raúl Grijalva
- Succeeded by: Greg Casar

Member of the U.S. House of Representatives from Washington's 7th district
- Incumbent
- Assumed office January 3, 2017
- Preceded by: Jim McDermott

Member of the Washington Senate from the 37th district
- In office January 12, 2015 – December 11, 2016
- Preceded by: Adam Kline
- Succeeded by: Rebecca Saldaña

Personal details
- Born: Jayapal Pramila; September 21, 1965 (age 61) Madras, Madras State, India
- Citizenship: India (1965–2000); United States (2000–present)
- Party: Democratic
- Spouses: Alan Preston (m. 1990; div. 2000); Steve Williamson (m. 2007)
- Children: 1
- Relatives: Maya Jayapal (mother); Susheela Jayapal (sister)
- Education: Georgetown University (BA); Northwestern University (MBA)
- Website: House website Campaign website
- Jayapal's voice Jayapal supporting the American Families Plan. Recorded June 15, 2021

Pramila Jayapal (Note: Pronounced /prəˈmɪlə ˈdʒaɪəpɑːl/ prə-MIL-ə JY-ə-pahl.) (born September 21, 1965) is an American politician serving as the U.S. representative from Washington's 7th congressional district since 2017. A member of the Democratic Party, she represents most of Seattle, as well as some suburban areas of King County. Jayapal represented the 37th legislative district in the Washington State Senate from 2015 to 2017. She is the first Indian American woman to serve in the U.S. House of Representatives. The district's first female member of Congress, she is also the first Asian American to represent Washington at the federal level.

Before entering electoral politics, Jayapal was a Seattle-based civil rights activist, serving until 2012 as the executive director of OneAmerica, an immigrant advocacy group. She founded the organization, originally called Hate Free Zone, after the September 11 attacks. Jayapal co-chaired the Congressional Progressive Caucus from 2019 to 2021, followed by a term serving as Chair from 2021 to 2025. She serves on both the Judiciary Committee and Budget Committee.

== Early life and education ==
Jayapal was born on September 21, 1965, into a Malayali Nair family in Chennai, India, to Maya Jayapal (née Menon), a writer, and Muduvangad Puthanveetil Jayapal, a marketing professional. She spent most of her childhood in Indonesia and Singapore. She can speak Hindi but does not speak Malayalam fluently. Jayapal attended Jakarta Intercultural School. She came to the U.S. in 1982, at age 16, to attend college. She earned a Bachelor of Arts degree from Georgetown University and a Master of Business Administration from the Kellogg School of Management at Northwestern University.

After graduating from college, Jayapal worked for PaineWebber as a financial analyst. At PaineWebber, she began to work on development projects from Chicago to Thailand. Later, she briefly worked in sales and marketing for a medical company before moving into the public sector in 1991.

== Early career ==
=== Advocacy work ===
Jayapal founded Hate Free Zone after the 2001 September 11 attacks as an advocacy group for immigrant groups. Hate Free Zone registered new American citizens to vote and lobbied on immigration reform and related issues. It successfully sued the Bush Administration's Immigration and Naturalization Services to prevent the deportation of over 4,000 Somalis across the country. In 2008, the group changed its name to OneAmerica. Jayapal stepped down from her leadership position in May 2012. In 2013, she was recognized by the White House as a "Champion of Change".

On June 29, 2018, Jayapal participated in Women Disobey and the sit-in at the Hart Senate Office Building to protest against the Trump administration's "zero-tolerance" approach to illegal immigration. The protest resulted in the arrest of over 500 people, including Jayapal. She said she was "proud to have been arrested" for protesting the administration's "inhumane and cruel" policy.

=== Washington legislature ===
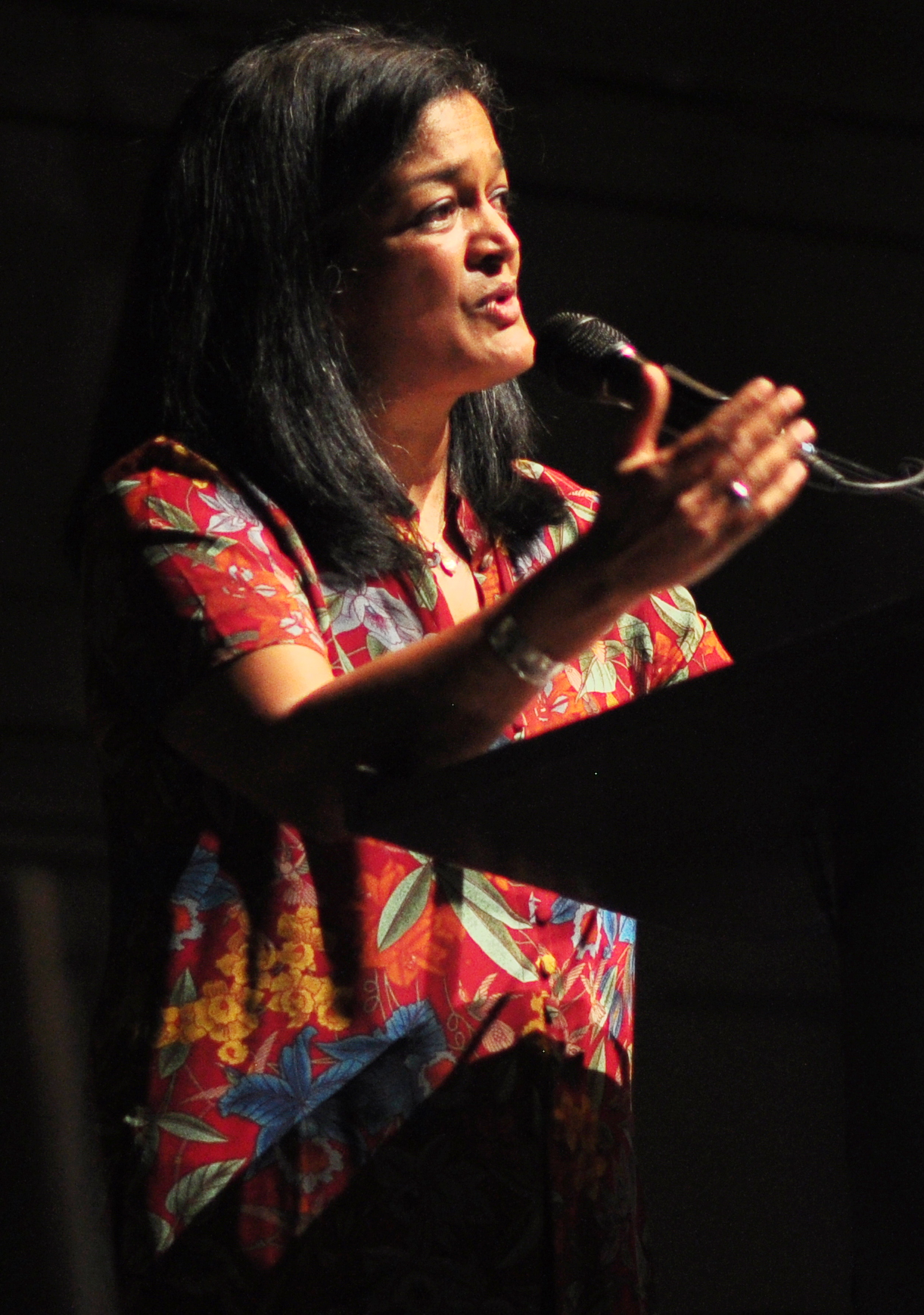
Pramila Jayapal speaks in Seattle in 2015

Jayapal served on the Mayoral Advisory Committee that negotiated Seattle's $15 minimum wage and co-chaired the mayor's police chief search committee, which resulted in the unanimous selection of the city's first female police chief.

After State Senator Adam Kline announced his retirement in early 2014, Jayapal entered the race to succeed him. She was endorsed by Seattle Mayor Ed Murray and won more than 51% of the vote in the August 5 primary, out of a field of six candidates. She defeated fellow Democrat Louis Watanabe in November.

In the Washington State Senate, Jayapal was the primary sponsor of SB 5863, which directs the Washington State Department of Transportation to administer a pre-apprenticeship program targeting women and people of color; the bill passed into law in July 2015. She co-sponsored a bill to test and track thousands of police department rape kits.

Jayapal endorsed Senator Bernie Sanders for President of the United States in the 2016 Democratic primaries.

== U.S. House of Representatives ==
=== Elections ===
In January 2016, Jayapal declared her candidacy for Congress in Washington's 7th congressional district, after incumbent Representative Jim McDermott announced his retirement. In April, she was endorsed by Bernie Sanders. On August 2, Jayapal finished first in the top-two primary, alongside state representative Brady Walkinshaw, also a Democrat. This was the first time in the state's history that a federal seat was contested by two Democrats. Both identified as progressive Democrats. The 7th is the most Democratic district in the Pacific Northwest, and the seat was all but certain to stay in Democratic hands even if a Republican took the second spot in the primary.

In the final weeks of the race, Jayapal and her supporters contested claims from Walkinshaw that she had not advanced enough legislation. Jayapal won the general election with 56% of the vote.

=== Tenure ===
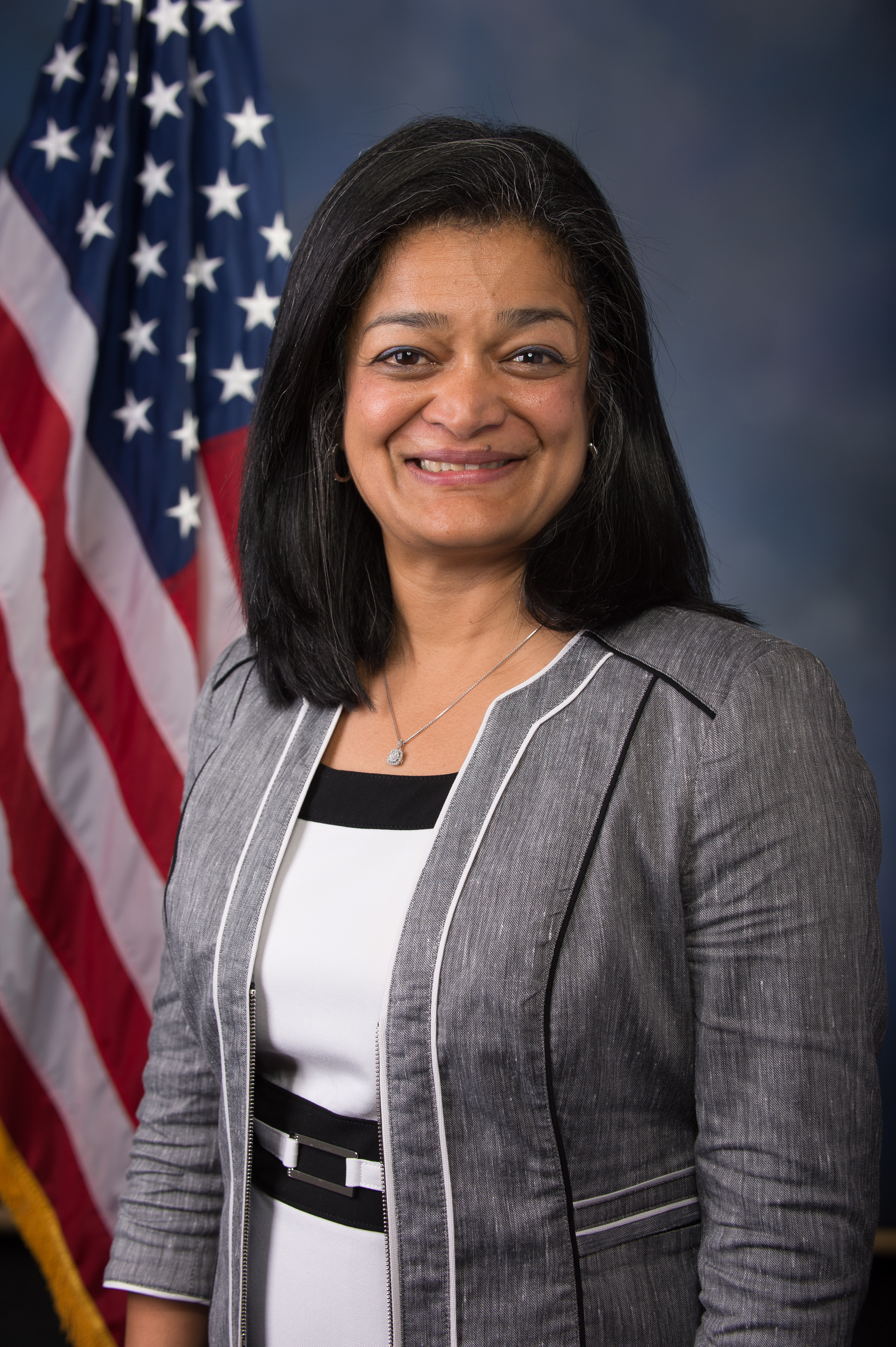
Pramila Jayapal's freshman portrait

Jayapal became the first Indian American woman to serve in the U.S. House of Representatives.

On January 6, 2017, Jayapal objected to Georgia's 16 electoral votes, which Donald Trump had won by over 200,000 votes. Because no senator joined her objection, the objection was dismissed.

During Trump's inauguration, Jayapal met with constituents in her congressional district instead of attending the ceremony. The Nation called her "a leader of the resistance," quoting Minority Leader Nancy Pelosi calling Jayapal "a rising star in the Democratic caucus." In September, Representative Don Young apologized to her after calling her "young lady" in an exchange that went viral. Jayapal has described facing sexism from colleagues in Congress.

On January 20, 2020, Jayapal endorsed Senator Bernie Sanders in the 2020 Democratic presidential primaries.

In September 2021, BuzzFeed reported that 14 former staffers had described Jayapal's congressional office as a volatile and dysfunctional workplace. Jayapal's office responded with a statement calling the allegations "sexist", "ugly stereotypes", and lacking context.

In 2024, Jayapal raised over $400,000 for the election campaign of Vice President Harris, as well as making other public statements in praise of Harris.

==== Foreign Affairs ====
Jayapal voted against a House resolution condemning the United Nations Security Council resolution on Israeli settlements built on the occupied Palestinian Territories in the West Bank. In July 2019, she voted against a House resolution condemning the Boycott, Divestment, and Sanctions movement targeting Israel. The resolution passed 398–17. On July 16, 2023, she addressed the Congressional Progressive Caucus, and described Israel as a “racist state”. Later, she apologized for the remarks and issued a statement criticizing the government of Benjamin Netanyahu as "extreme right-wing" and said it had "engaged in discriminatory and outright racist policies". She voted for a resolution proposed by August Pfluger (R-TX) which states that “the State of Israel is not a racist or apartheid state", that Congress rejects "all forms of antisemitism and xenophobia" and that “the United States will always be a staunch partner and supporter of Israel."

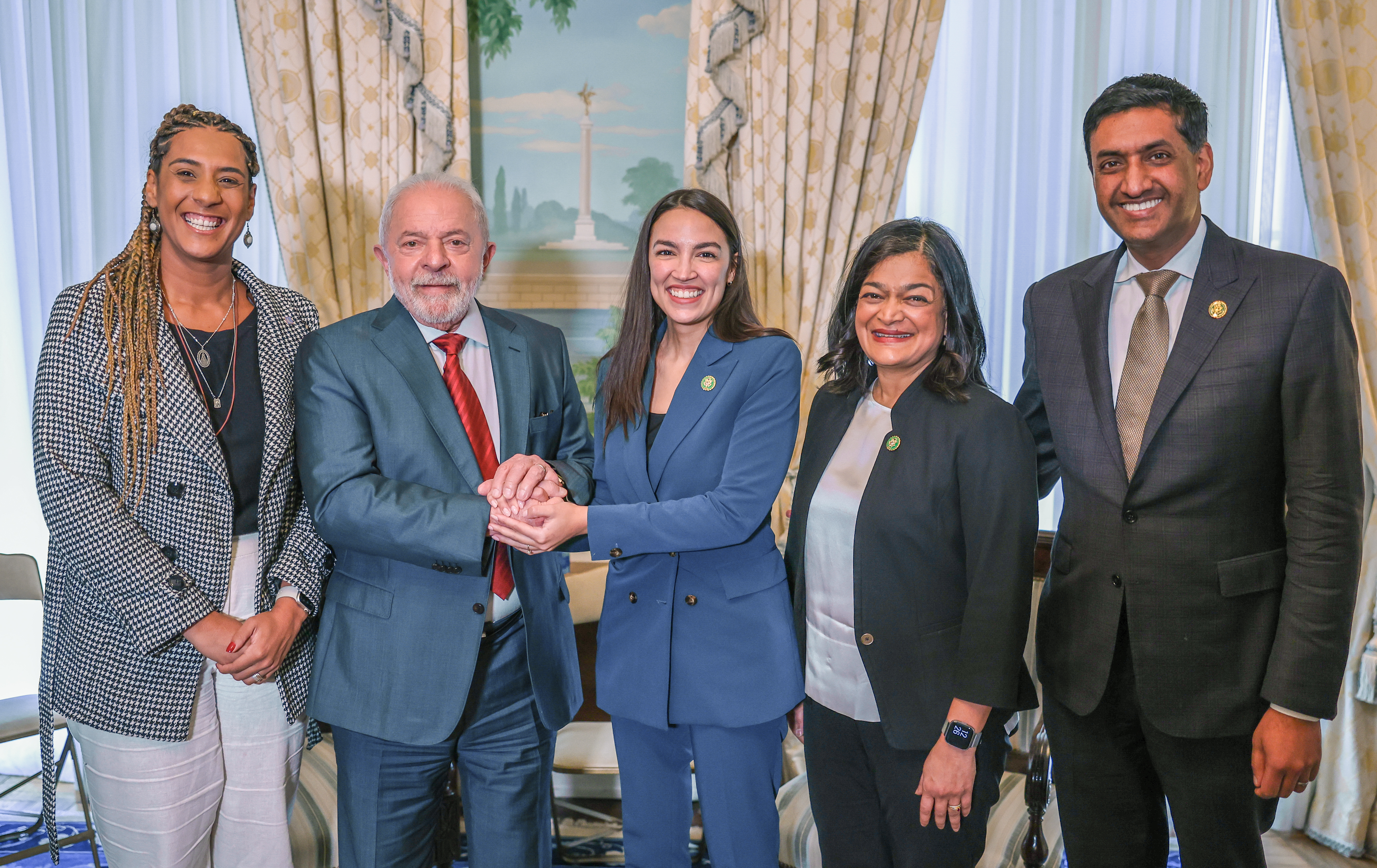
Jayapal with Alexandria Ocasio-Cortez, Ro Khanna and Brazilian President Luiz Inácio Lula da Silva, February 2, 2023

On April 25, 2018, 57 members of the House of Representatives, including Jayapal, released a condemnation of Holocaust distortion in Ukraine and Poland. They criticized Poland's new Holocaust law, which would criminalize accusing Poles (as a nation (Note: The Polish law in question said "Whoever claims, publicly and contrary to the facts, that the Polish Nation or the Republic of Poland is responsible or co-responsible for Nazi crimes committed by the Third Reich <...> shall be liable to a fine or imprisonment for up to 3 years". Following the international outcry and pressure, the criminal offense was replaced with civil offense in the law.)) of complicity in the Holocaust, and Ukraine's 2015 memory laws glorifying the Ukrainian Insurgent Army (UPA) and its pro-Nazi leaders, such as Roman Shukhevych.

In April 2019, after the House passed the resolution withdrawing American support for the Saudi-led coalition in Yemen, Jayapal was one of nine lawmakers to sign a letter to Trump requesting a meeting with him and urging him to sign "Senate Joint Resolution 7, which invokes the War Powers Act of 1973 to end unauthorized US military participation in the Saudi-led coalition's armed conflict against Yemen's Houthi forces, initiated in 2015 by the Obama administration." They asserted the "Saudi-led coalition's imposition of an air-land-and-sea blockade as part of its war against Yemen’s Houthis has continued to prevent the unimpeded distribution of these vital commodities, contributing to the suffering and death of vast numbers of civilians throughout the country" and that Trump's approval of the resolution through his signing would give a "powerful signal to the Saudi-led coalition to bring the four-year-old war to a close".

In December 2019, Jayapal introduced a bill to urge India to lift curbs on communications in Kashmir. These curbs were introduced as part of revocation of the special status of Jammu and Kashmir in August 2019. Later that month, the Foreign Minister of India canceled a meeting with U.S. lawmakers, citing Jayapal's inclusion on the invitee list. The bill has seen no movement since its introduction in Congress.

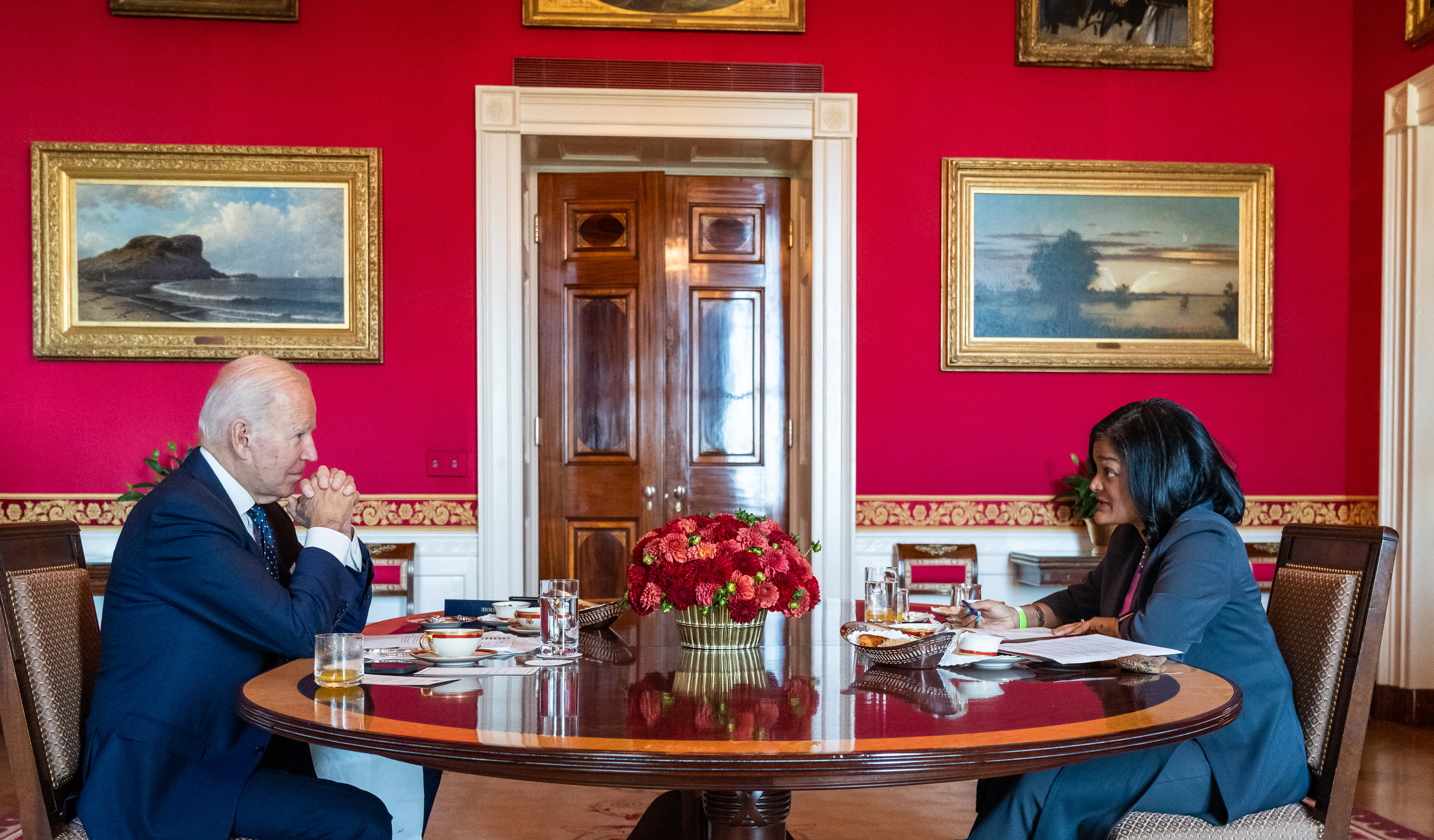
Pramila Jayapal meets with President Joe Biden in October 2021 in the Red Room of the White House.

An October 24, 2022, letter, led by Jayapal and signed by 30 progressive Democrats, called on President Biden to pursue negotiations with Vladimir Putin to end the invasion of Ukraine. The letter was withdrawn a day later after Jayapal said it was drafted months ago and was released by a staffer "without vetting". The reason for the retraction was disputed, and Politico reported that Jayapal approved the letter's release on October 24.

On July 6, 2023, US President Joe Biden authorized the provision of cluster munitions to Ukraine in support of a Ukrainian counter-offensive against Russian forces in Russian-occupied southeastern Ukraine. Jayapal opposed the decision of the Biden administration to supply cluster munitions to Ukraine.

==== Budget ====
Jayapal supports decreasing U.S. military spending. She, Barbara Lee and Mark Pocan attempted to reduce the size of the $740 billion National Defense Authorization Act for Fiscal Year 2021, but their motion failed 93-324.

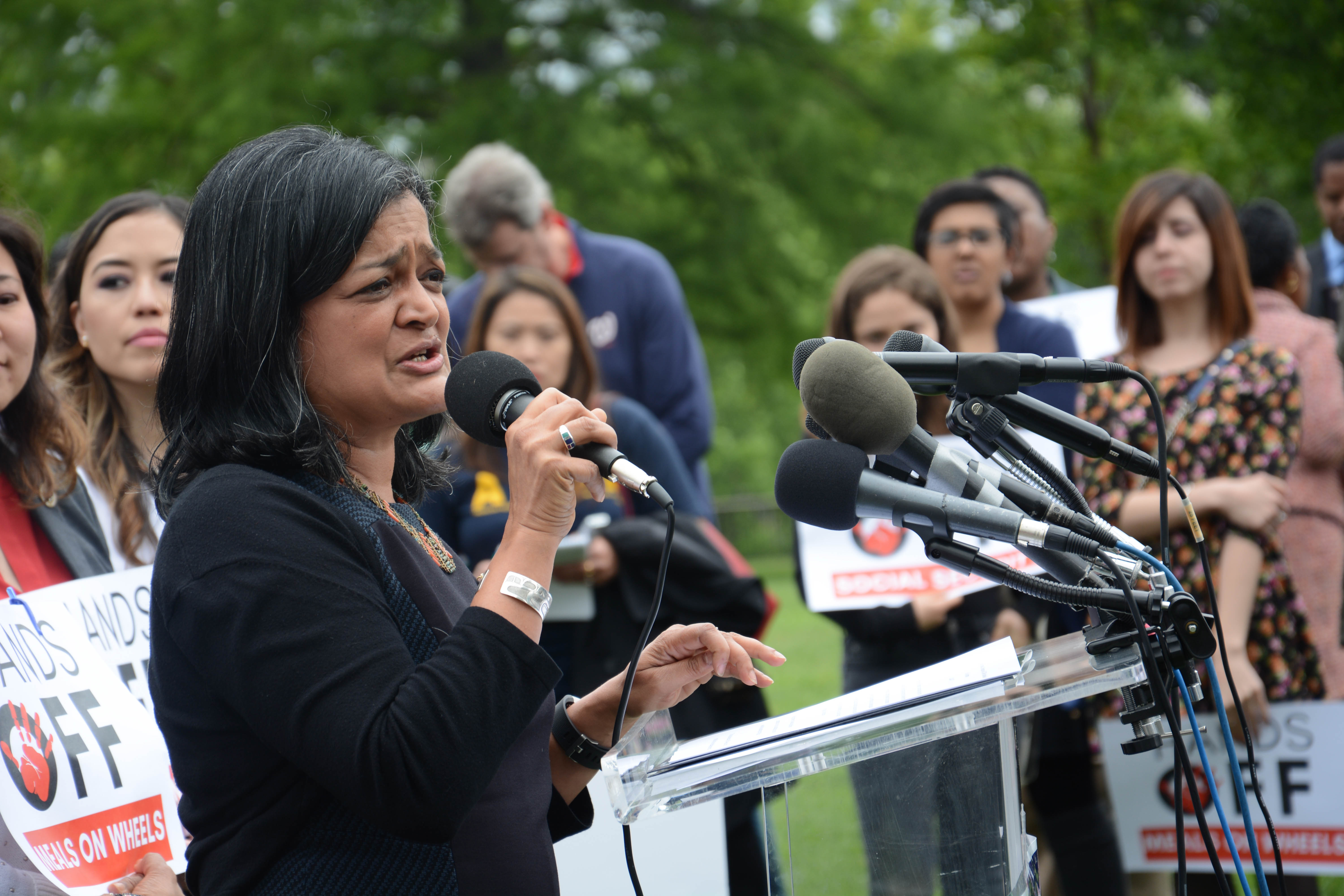
Hands Off Budget rally in Washington, D.C. on May 24, 2017

Jayapal was among the 46 Democrats who voted against final passage of the Fiscal Responsibility Act of 2023 in the House.

Jayapal has opposed and mocked President Trump's "one big, beautiful" Budget reconciliation Bill in 2025 as "one big, beautiful betrayal."

==== Healthcare ====
She supports universal health care and co-sponsored the Expanded and Improved Medicare For All Act.

In February 2019, Jayapal sponsored and introduced the Medicare for All Act of 2019 with more than 100 co-sponsors. The bill would create a publicly financed comprehensive, universal, and guaranteed healthcare insurance system for every U.S. resident. It represented the continuation of progressives' long-term campaign in Congress to introduce a guaranteed health care system. In 2021, Jayapal introduced similar legislation for the 117th Congress.

==== Government transparency ====
Jayapal and Representative Jamie Raskin (D-MD) introduced the Trump Transparency Package, a series of bills aimed at promoting transparency and eliminating conflicts of interest in the Trump White House.

She supports a ban on members trading in stocks. Jayapal was one of the original 16 cosponsors of the Restore Trust in Congress Act (H.R.5106), introduced on September 3, 2025, by Republican Chip Roy of Texas. The act, a bipartisan effort to ban members of Congress and their spouses and dependents from owning and trading stocks, had 119 cosponsors as of December, 2025.

==== Other progressive policies ====
Jayapal and her fellow co-chairs of the United for Climate and Environmental Justice Task Force introduced a package of environmental justice bills to fight the impact of climate change on frontline communities.

Jayapal is a co-sponsor of legislation intended to make public colleges and universities free for most families and significantly reduce student debt. Jayapal is also a supporter of the Equal Rights Amendment.

=== Leadership posts ===
- Senior Whip, Democratic Caucus of the United States House of Representatives
- Vice Ranking Member, United States House Committee on the Budget
- Chair, Congressional Progressive Caucus
- Co-chair and co-founder, United for Climate and Environmental Justice Task Force
- Chair, Immigration Task Force, Congressional Asian Pacific American Caucus (CAPAC)
- Co-chair, Women's Working Group on Immigration Reform
- DNC Transition Team Member

=== Committee memberships ===
- Committee on the Judiciary
  - Subcommittee on Immigration Integrity, Security, and Enforcement (Ranking Member)
  - Subcommittee on the Constitution and Limited Government
- Committee on Foreign Affairs
  - Subcommittee on Africa
  - Subcommittee on South and Central Asia
- Committee on the Budget

=== Caucus memberships ===
- Congressional Asian Pacific American Caucus
- Medicare for All Caucus
- Congressional Freethought Caucus
- Congressional LGBTQ+ Equality Caucus (vice chair)
- Congressional Progressive Caucus

== Personal life ==
Jayapal was formerly married to Alan J. Preston from 1990 until 2000. Preston is the brother of Dean Preston, a former member of the San Francisco Board of Supervisors. She initially lost her green card when she gave birth prematurely in India and was unable to return in time to maintain Permanent Resident status. She became a U.S. citizen in 2000. She is the author of Pilgrimage: One Woman's Return to a Changing India, published in March 2000.

Jayapal lives in Seattle with her husband, Steven R. Williamson whom she married on August 4, 2007. Kashika, Jayapal's child from her previous marriage to Preston, is transgender and previously identified as non-binary. She also has a stepson, Michael. Jayapal's older sister Susheela has served on the Multnomah County Commission since 2019. Susheela announced that she would run in Oregon's 3rd congressional district after Earl Blumenauer announced in 2023 that he would retire rather than run in the 2024 election. Susheela ultimately lost to Maxine Dexter in the Democratic primary.

Jayapal tested positive for COVID-19 on January 11, 2021. In a statement released after her diagnosis, she criticized her Republican colleagues for refusing to wear masks when members of Congress were placed on lockdown during the 2021 United States Capitol attack.

On July 9, 2022, Seattle resident Brett Forsell was arrested after he arrived at Jayapal's Seattle house and yelled obscenities and threats at her. Forsell was released and charged when more evidence had been collected. Forsell had driven by her house repeatedly for weeks, shouting insults. When arrested, he was armed with a handgun with a round in its chamber. He was charged with felony stalking and released on $150,000 bail. In June 2023, Forsell pled guilty to stalking and was sentenced to 364 days in jail followed by 24 months of probation.

== Electoral history ==
Washington's 7th congressional district election, 2016
Primary election
Party	Candidate	Votes	%
Democratic	Pramila Jayapal	82,753	42.11
Democratic	Brady Walkinshaw	41,773	21.26
Democratic	Joe McDermott	37,495	19.08
Republican	Craig Keller	16,058	8.17
Republican	Scott Sutherland	9,008	4.58
Democratic	Arun Jhaveri	3,389	1.72
Independent	Leslie Regier	2,592	1.32
Democratic	Don Rivers	2,379	1.21
Independent	Carl Cooper	1,056	0.54
Total votes		196,503	100.00
General election
Democratic	Pramila Jayapal	212,010	55.98
Democratic	Brady Walkinshaw	166,744	44.02
Total votes		378,754	100.00
Democratic hold			

Washington's 7th congressional district election, 2018
Primary election
Party	Candidate	Votes	%
Democratic	Pramila Jayapal (incumbent)	189,175	82.67
Republican	Craig Keller	39,657	17.33
Total votes		228,832	100.00
General election
Democratic	Pramila Jayapal (incumbent)	329,800	83.56
Republican	Craig Keller	64,881	16.44
Total votes		394,681	100.00
Democratic hold			

Washington's 7th congressional district election, 2020
Primary election
Party	Candidate	Votes	%
Democratic	Pramila Jayapal (incumbent)	240,801	79.98
Republican	Craig Keller	24,477	8.13
Independent	Rick Lewis	13,885	4.61
Republican	Scott Sutherland	11,332	3.76
Democratic	Jack Hughes-Hageman	10,052	3.34
Write-in		537	0.18
Total votes		301,084	100.00
General election
Democratic	Pramila Jayapal (incumbent)	387,109	82.99
Republican	Craig Keller	78,240	16.77
Write-in		1,113	0.24
Total votes		466,462	100.00
Democratic hold			

Washington's 7th congressional district election, 2022
Primary election
Party	Candidate	Votes	%
Democratic	Pramila Jayapal (incumbent)	177,665	84.87
Republican	Cliff Moon	15,834	7.56
Republican	Paul Glumaz	10,982	5.25
Independent	Jesse James	4,859	2.32
Total votes		209,340	100.00
General election
Democratic	Pramila Jayapal (incumbent)	295,998	85.39
Republican	Cliff Moon	49,207	14.20
Write-in		1,442	0.42
Total votes		346,647	100.00
Democratic hold			

Washington's 7th congressional district election, 2024
Party	Candidate	Votes	%
Democratic	Pramila Jayapal (incumbent)	174,019	79.86
Republican	Dan Alexander	16,902	7.76
Democratic	Liz Hallock	16,494	7.57
Republican	Cliff Moon	10,070	4.62
Write-in		409	0.19
Total votes		217,894	100.00
General election
Democratic	Pramila Jayapal (incumbent)	352,286	83.91
Republican	Dan Alexander	66,220	15.77
Write-in		1,313	0.31
Total votes		419,819	100.00
Democratic hold			

== See also ==
- List of people from Chennai
- List of Indian Americans
- List of naturalized American citizens
- List of Kellogg School of Management alumni
- List of foreign politicians of Indian origin
- List of foreign-born United States politicians
- List of Asian Americans and Pacific Islands Americans in the United States Congress
- Women in the United States House of Representatives
- List of United States representatives from Washington
- List of new members of the 115th United States Congress
- List of United States representatives in the 115th Congress
- List of United States representatives in the 116th Congress
- List of United States representatives in the 117th Congress
- List of members of the Congressional Progressive Caucus
- List of current United States representatives
- List of Bernie Sanders 2016 presidential campaign endorsements
- List of Hillary Clinton 2016 presidential campaign political endorsements
- List of Bernie Sanders 2020 presidential campaign endorsements
- List of Joe Biden 2020 presidential campaign congressional endorsements
- List of automatic delegates at the 2020 Democratic National Convention

== Notes ==
U.S. House of Representatives
Preceded by Jim McDermott	Member of the U.S. House of Representatives from Washington's 7th congressional district 2017–present	Incumbent
Party political offices
Preceded by Raúl Grijalva	Chair of the Congressional Progressive Caucus; 2019–2025; Served alongside: Mark Pocan (2019–2021)	Succeeded by Greg Casar
U.S. order of precedence (ceremonial)
Preceded by Clay Higgins	United States representatives by seniority 168th	Succeeded by Mike Johnson
