= List of United States senators in the 117th Congress =

This is a complete list of United States senators during the 117th United States Congress listed by seniority from January 3, 2021, to January 3, 2023. It is a historical listing and will contain people who have not served the entire two-year Congress should anyone resign, die, or be expelled.

In this Congress, the most junior senior senator was Kelly Loeffler until Jon Ossoff (from the other seat) and Raphael Warnock (Loeffler's successor) were sworn in on January 20, 2021, after which Ossoff became the most junior senior senator. The most senior junior senator is Maria Cantwell.

Order of service is based on the commencement of the senator's first term. Behind this is former service as a senator (only giving the senator seniority within their new incoming class), service as vice president, a House member, a cabinet secretary, or a governor of a state. The final factors are the population of the senator's state and the alphabetical position of the senator's surname.

== Terms of service ==
| Class | Terms of service of senators that expired or will expire in years |
|---|---|
| Class 3 | Terms of service of senators that expired in 2023 (Alabama, Alaska, Arizona, Arkansas, California, Colorado, Connecticut, Delaware, Florida, Georgia, Hawaii, Idaho, Illinois, Iowa, Indiana, Kansas, Kentucky, Louisiana, Massachusetts, Maine, Michigan, Minnesota, Mississippi, North Carolina, North Dakota, New Hampshire, New Mexico, Nevada, New York, Oklahoma, Oregon, South Carolina, South Dakota, Tennessee, Utah, Washington and Wisconsin.) |
| Class 1 | Terms of service of senators that expired in 2025 (Arizona, California, Connecticut, Delaware, Florida, Hawaii, Indiana, Maine, Maryland, Massachusetts, Michigan, Minnesota, Mississippi, Missouri, Montana, Nebraska, Nevada, New Jersey, New Mexico, New York, North Dakota, Ohio, Pennsylvania, Rhode Island, Tennessee, Texas, Utah, Vermont, Virginia, Washington, West Virginia, Wisconsin, and Wyoming.) |
| Class 2 | Terms of service of senators that will expire in 2027 (Alabama, Alaska, Arkansas, Colorado, Delaware, Georgia, Iowa, Idaho, Illinois, Kansas, Kentucky, Louisiana, Massachusetts, Maine, Michigan, Minnesota, Mississippi, Montana, North Carolina, Nebraska, New Hampshire, New Jersey, New Mexico, Oklahoma, Oregon, Rhode Island, South Carolina, South Dakota, Tennessee, Texas, Virginia, West Virginia, and Wyoming.) |

== U.S. Senate seniority list ==
| Rank | Historical rank | Senator | Party | State | Seniority date | Other factors |
|---|---|---|---|---|---|---|
| 1 | 1692 | Patrick Leahy | Democratic | Vermont | January 3, 1975 | |
| 2 | 1743 | Chuck Grassley | Republican | Iowa | January 3, 1981 | |
| 3 | 1766 | Mitch McConnell | Republican | Kentucky | January 3, 1985 | |
| 4 | 1775 | Richard Shelby | Republican | Alabama | January 3, 1987 | |
| 5 | 1801 | Dianne Feinstein | Democratic | California | November 10, 1992 | |
| 6 | 1812 | Patty Murray | Democratic | Washington | January 3, 1993 | |
| 7 | 1816 | Jim Inhofe | Republican | Oklahoma | November 17, 1994 | |
| 8 | 1827 | Ron Wyden | Democratic | Oregon | February 6, 1996 | |
| 9 | 1831 | Dick Durbin | Democratic | Illinois | January 3, 1997 | Former member of the U.S. House of Representatives (14 years) |
| 10 | 1835 | Jack Reed | Democratic | Rhode Island | January 3, 1997 | Former member of the U.S. House of Representatives (6 years) |
| 11 | 1842 | Susan Collins | Republican | Maine | January 3, 1997 | |
| 12 | 1844 | Chuck Schumer | Democratic | New York | January 3, 1999 | Former member of the U.S. House of Representatives (18 years) |
| 13 | 1846 | Mike Crapo | Republican | Idaho | January 3, 1999 | Former member of the U.S. House of Representatives (6 years) |
| 14 | 1855 | Tom Carper | Democratic | Delaware | January 3, 2001 | Former member of the U.S. House of Representatives (10 years) |
| 15 | 1856 | Debbie Stabenow | Democratic | Michigan | January 3, 2001 | Former member of the U.S. House of Representatives (4 years) |
| 16 | 1859 | Maria Cantwell | Democratic | Washington | January 3, 2001 | Former member of the U.S. House of Representatives (2 years) |
| 17 | 1867 | John Cornyn | Republican | Texas | December 1, 2002 | |
| 18 | 1868 | Lisa Murkowski | Republican | Alaska | December 20, 2002 | |
| 19 | 1870 | Lindsey Graham | Republican | South Carolina | January 3, 2003 | |
| 20 | 1876 | Richard Burr | Republican | North Carolina | January 3, 2005 | Former member of the U.S. House of Representatives (10 years) |
| 21 | 1879 | John Thune | Republican | South Dakota | January 3, 2005 | Former member of the U.S. House of Representatives (6 years) |
| 22 | 1885 | Bob Menendez | Democratic | New Jersey | January 18, 2006 | |
| 23 | 1886 | Ben Cardin | Democratic | Maryland | January 3, 2007 | Former member of the U.S. House of Representatives (20 years) |
| 24 | 1887 | Bernie Sanders | Independent | Vermont | January 3, 2007 | Former member of the U.S. House of Representatives (16 years) |
| 25 | 1888 | Sherrod Brown | Democratic | Ohio | January 3, 2007 | Former member of the U.S. House of Representatives (14 years) |
| 26 | 1889 | Bob Casey, Jr. | Democratic | Pennsylvania | January 3, 2007 | Pennsylvania 6th in population (2000) |
| 27 | 1893 | Amy Klobuchar | Democratic | Minnesota | January 3, 2007 | Minnesota 21st in population (2000) |
| 28 | 1894 | Sheldon Whitehouse | Democratic | Rhode Island | January 3, 2007 | Rhode Island 43rd in population (2000) |
| 29 | 1895 | Jon Tester | Democratic | Montana | January 3, 2007 | Montana 44th in population (2000) |
| 30 | 1896 | John Barrasso | Republican | Wyoming | June 25, 2007 | |
| 31 | 1897 | Roger Wicker | Republican | Mississippi | December 31, 2007 | |
| 32 | 1901 | Jeanne Shaheen | Democratic | New Hampshire | January 3, 2009 | Former governor (6 years) |
| 33 | 1902 | Mark Warner | Democratic | Virginia | January 3, 2009 | Former governor (4 years) |
| 34 | 1903 | Jim Risch | Republican | Idaho | January 3, 2009 | Former governor (7 months) |
| 35 | 1905 | Jeff Merkley | Democratic | Oregon | January 3, 2009 | |
| 36 | 1909 | Michael Bennet | Democratic | Colorado | January 21, 2009 | |
| 37 | 1910 | Kirsten Gillibrand | Democratic | New York | January 26, 2009 | |
| 38 | 1916 | Joe Manchin | Democratic | West Virginia | November 15, 2010 | Former governor |
| 39 | 1917 | Chris Coons | Democratic | Delaware | November 15, 2010 | |
| 40 | 1919 | Roy Blunt | Republican | Missouri | January 3, 2011 | Former member of the U.S. House of Representatives (14 years); Missouri 17th in population (2000) |
| 41 | 1920 | Jerry Moran | Republican | Kansas | January 3, 2011 | Former member of the U.S. House of Representatives (14 years); Kansas 32nd in population (2000) |
| 42 | 1921 | Rob Portman | Republican | Ohio | January 3, 2011 | Former member of the U.S. House of Representatives (12 years) |
| 43 | 1922 | John Boozman | Republican | Arkansas | January 3, 2011 | Former member of the U.S. House of Representatives (9 years) |
| 44 | 1923 | Pat Toomey | Republican | Pennsylvania | January 3, 2011 | Former member of the U.S. House of Representatives (6 years) |
| 45 | 1924 | John Hoeven | Republican | North Dakota | January 3, 2011 | Former governor |
| 46 | 1925 | Marco Rubio | Republican | Florida | January 3, 2011 | Florida 4th in population (2000) |
| 47 | 1926 | Ron Johnson | Republican | Wisconsin | January 3, 2011 | Wisconsin 18th in population (2000) |
| 48 | 1927 | Rand Paul | Republican | Kentucky | January 3, 2011 | Kentucky 25th in population (2000) |
| 49 | 1928 | Richard Blumenthal | Democratic | Connecticut | January 3, 2011 | Connecticut 29th in population (2000) |
| 50 | 1929 | Mike Lee | Republican | Utah | January 3, 2011 | Utah 34th in population (2000) |
| 51 | 1932 | Brian Schatz | Democratic | Hawaii | December 27, 2012 | |
| 52 | 1933 | Tim Scott | Republican | South Carolina | January 2, 2013 | |
| 53 | 1934 | Tammy Baldwin | Democratic | Wisconsin | January 3, 2013 | Former member of the U.S. House of Representatives (14 years) |
| 54 | 1937 | Chris Murphy | Democratic | Connecticut | January 3, 2013 | Former member of the U.S. House of Representatives (6 years); Connecticut 29th in population (2010) |
| 55 | 1938 | Mazie Hirono | Democratic | Hawaii | January 3, 2013 | Former member of the U.S. House of Representatives (6 years); Hawaii 42nd in population (2010) |
| 56 | 1939 | Martin Heinrich | Democratic | New Mexico | January 3, 2013 | Former member of the U.S. House of Representatives (4 years) |
| 57 | 1940 | Angus King | Independent | Maine | January 3, 2013 | Former governor (8 years) |
| 58 | 1941 | Tim Kaine | Democratic | Virginia | January 3, 2013 | Former governor (4 years) |
| 59 | 1942 | Ted Cruz | Republican | Texas | January 3, 2013 | Texas 2nd in population (2010) |
| 60 | 1943 | Elizabeth Warren | Democratic | Massachusetts | January 3, 2013 | Massachusetts 15th in population (2010) |
| 61 | 1944 | Deb Fischer | Republican | Nebraska | January 3, 2013 | Nebraska 38th in population (2010) |
| 62 | 1948 | Ed Markey | Democratic | Massachusetts | July 16, 2013 | |
| 63 | 1949 | Cory Booker | Democratic | New Jersey | October 31, 2013 | |
| 64 | 1951 | Shelley Moore Capito | Republican | West Virginia | January 3, 2015 | Former member of the U.S. House of Representatives (14 years) |
| 65 | 1952 | Gary Peters | Democratic | Michigan | January 3, 2015 | Former member of the U.S. House of Representatives (6 years); Michigan 9th in population (2010) |
| 66 | 1953 | Bill Cassidy | Republican | Louisiana | January 3, 2015 | Former member of the U.S. House of Representatives (6 years); Louisiana 25th in population (2010) |
| 67 | 1955 | James Lankford | Republican | Oklahoma | January 3, 2015 | Former member of the U.S. House of Representatives (4 years) |
| 68 | 1956 | Tom Cotton | Republican | Arkansas | January 3, 2015 | Former member of the U.S. House of Representatives (2 years); Arkansas 32nd in population (2010) |
| 69 | 1957 | Steve Daines | Republican | Montana | January 3, 2015 | Former member of the U.S. House of Representatives (2 years); Montana 44th in population (2010) |
| 70 | 1958 | Mike Rounds | Republican | South Dakota | January 3, 2015 | Former governor |
| 71 | 1960 | Thom Tillis | Republican | North Carolina | January 3, 2015 | North Carolina 10th in population (2010) |
| 72 | 1961 | Joni Ernst | Republican | Iowa | January 3, 2015 | Iowa 30th in population (2010) |
| 73 | 1962 | Ben Sasse | Republican | Nebraska | January 3, 2015 | Nebraska 38th in population (2010) |
| 74 | 1963 | Dan Sullivan | Republican | Alaska | January 3, 2015 | Alaska 47th in population (2010) |
| 75 | 1964 | Chris Van Hollen | Democratic | Maryland | January 3, 2017 | Former member of the U.S. House of Representatives (14 years) |
| 76 | 1965 | Todd Young | Republican | Indiana | January 3, 2017 | Former member of the U.S. House of Representatives (6 years) |
| 77 | 1966 | Tammy Duckworth | Democratic | Illinois | January 3, 2017 | Former member of the U.S. House of Representatives (4 years) |
| 78 | 1967 | Maggie Hassan | Democratic | New Hampshire | January 3, 2017 | Former governor |
| 79 | 1968 | Kamala Harris (Note: In California, Kamala Harris (D) resigned January 18, 2021. She was replaced by Alex Padilla (D), who was appointed by Governor Gavin Newsom.) | Democratic | California | January 3, 2017 | California 1st in population (2010) |
| 80 | 1969 | John Neely Kennedy | Republican | Louisiana | January 3, 2017 | Louisiana 25th in population (2010) |
| 81 | 1970 | Catherine Cortez Masto | Democratic | Nevada | January 3, 2017 | Nevada 35th in population (2010) |
| 82 | 1972 | Tina Smith | Democratic | Minnesota | January 3, 2018 | |
| 83 | 1974 | Cindy Hyde-Smith | Republican | Mississippi | April 2, 2018 | |
| 84 | 1975 | Marsha Blackburn | Republican | Tennessee | January 3, 2019 | Former member of the U.S. House of Representatives (16 years) |
| 85 | 1976 | Kyrsten Sinema | Democratic | Arizona | January 3, 2019 | Former member of the U.S. House of Representatives (6 years); Arizona 16th in population (2010) |
| 86 | 1977 | Kevin Cramer | Republican | North Dakota | January 3, 2019 | Former member of the U.S. House of Representatives (6 years); North Dakota 48th in population (2010) |
| 87 | 1979 | Jacky Rosen | Democratic | Nevada | January 3, 2019 | Former member of the U.S. House of Representatives (2 years) |
| 88 | 1980 | Mitt Romney | Republican | Utah | January 3, 2019 | Former governor |
| 89 | 1981 | Mike Braun | Republican | Indiana | January 3, 2019 | Indiana 15th in population (2010) |
| 90 | 1982 | Josh Hawley | Republican | Missouri | January 3, 2019 | Missouri 18th in population (2010) |
| 91 | 1983 | Rick Scott | Republican | Florida | January 8, 2019 | |
| 92 | 1984 | Kelly Loeffler (Note: In Georgia, Kelly Loeffler (R) was replaced by Raphael Warnock (D), who won the Jan. 5, 2021 special election runoff to complete Johnny Isakson's term.) | Republican | Georgia | January 6, 2020 | |
| 93 | 1985 | Mark Kelly | Democratic | Arizona | December 2, 2020 | |
| 94 | 1986 | Ben Ray Luján | Democratic | New Mexico | January 3, 2021 | Former member of the U.S. House of Representatives (12 years) |
| 95 | 1987 | Cynthia Lummis | Republican | Wyoming | January 3, 2021 | Former member of the U.S. House of Representatives (8 years) |
| 96 | 1988 | Roger Marshall | Republican | Kansas | January 3, 2021 | Former member of the U.S. House of Representatives (4 years) |
| 97 | 1989 | John Hickenlooper | Democratic | Colorado | January 3, 2021 | Former governor |
| 98 | 1990 | Bill Hagerty | Republican | Tennessee | January 3, 2021 | Tennessee 17th in population (2010) |
| 99 | 1991 | Tommy Tuberville | Republican | Alabama | January 3, 2021 | Alabama 23rd in population (2010) |
| | 1992 | Alex Padilla | Democratic | California | January 18, 2021 | |
| 100 | 1993 | Jon Ossoff (Note: Also in Georgia, Jon Ossoff (D) delayed his swearing-in awaiting the start of the Biden administration after the previous incumbent, David Perdue (R), expired his term before the runoff election.) (Note: Ossoff is the Senate's most junior senior senator.) | Democratic | Georgia | January 20, 2021 | 'O' 15th letter of the alphabet |
| | 1994 | Raphael Warnock | Democratic | Georgia | January 20, 2021 | 'W' 23rd letter of the alphabet |

The most senior senators by class were Dianne Feinstein (D-California) from Class 1, Mitch McConnell (R-Kentucky) from Class 2, and Patrick Leahy (D-Vermont) from Class 3.

== See also ==
- 117th United States Congress
- List of United States representatives in the 117th Congress
- Seniority in the United States Senate
