= Susheela Jayapal =

American politician (born 1962)

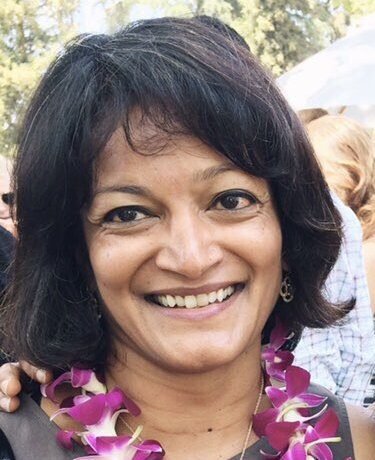

Member of the Multnomah County Board of Commissioners from the 2nd district
- In office January 3, 2019 – November 1, 2023
- Preceded by: Loretta Smith
- Succeeded by: Jesse Beason

Personal details
- Born: Jayapal Susheela; November 2, 1962 (age 64) Coimbatore, Madras State, India
- Party: Democratic
- Spouse: Bradley Miller (m. 1988; div. 2014)
- Children: 2
- Relatives: Maya Jayapal (mother); Pramila Jayapal (sister)
- Education: Swarthmore College (BA); University of Chicago (JD)

Susheela Jayapal (born November 2, 1962) is an American politician. From January 2019 to November 2023, she served as a county commissioner for Multnomah County, Oregon, the state's most populous county. She was the first Indian American to hold an elected office at the county level in Oregon.

She is the older sister of U.S. Representative Pramila Jayapal and the daughter of Indian writer Maya Jayapal. Jayapal was a candidate for Oregon's 3rd congressional district in the 2024 election, where she lost the Democratic primary to Maxine Dexter.

== Early life and education ==
Jayapal was born in Coimbatore, Tamil Nadu, India to Malayali parents. Growing up, her family frequently moved due to her father's job, and she lived in Bangalore as well as Jakarta and Singapore as a child. She graduated high school in Jakarta and came to the United States to attend Swarthmore College at the age of 16. After graduating from Swarthmore with a degree in economics at age 20, Jayapal got a job working for Goldman Sachs. She quickly became disillusioned with the job and decided to get a Juris Doctor, graduating from the University of Chicago Law School in 1988.

== Career ==
Jayapal moved to San Francisco, where she worked as a litigator and started a family, and then to Portland in 1994, working at the law firm Ater Wynne. She then moved to Adidas, leading its legal department. She worked for several Portland-area nonprofits after quitting Adidas.

=== Multnomah County Commission ===
Jayapal's sister, Pramila, was elected to the U.S. House of Representatives from Washington in 2016. While Jayapal was initially reluctant to get involved in politics, she was persuaded to run after Donald Trump took office as president, and won a seat on the Multnomah County Commission in May 2018 with 24,543 votes (61.63%), defeating three other candidates.

In October 2023, Jayapal supported efforts to ban the use of leaded gasoline at Portland International Raceway due to its proximity to residential neighborhoods. She also suggested that Portland Parks & Recreation, which owns the property, should consider alternative uses other than auto racing.

=== 2024 congressional candidacy ===
On October 31, 2023, following Earl Blumenauer's decision not to seek reelection, Jayapal announced she would resign from the Multnomah County Commission to pursue the Democratic nomination for Oregon's 3rd congressional district in the 2024 election. She officially launched her campaign the next day with endorsements from Multnomah County Chair Jessica Vega Pederson and Oregon State Representative Tawna Sanchez. Jayapal was replaced on the County Commission by her alternate, Jesse Beason.

If elected, Jayapal planned to focus on federal investments in public housing, gun control, abortion access, LGBTQ rights, and climate change. She has spoken in favor of environmentally-friendly public housing proposals akin to those proposed in the Green New Deal. Amid the Gaza war, Jayapal has stated she is the "only candidate in this race who has called for a sustainable, humanitarian cease-fire", and supports ending "unconditional military, financial or diplomatic aid" to the Israeli government.

In March 2024, Jayapal was endorsed by Senator Bernie Sanders, after previously receiving endorsements from Representatives Ro Khanna, Mark Pocan, and David Scott. She lost the primary to Maxine Dexter. Jayapal's opponent Dexter was the top recipient of independent expenditures in the primary, with the political action committee 314 Action spending about $2.2 million in total on independent expenditures in support of her campaign. The Intercept reported that 314 Action acted as a proxy for the pro-Israel lobbying group AIPAC.

== Personal life ==
Jayapal married Bradley Stuart Miller in 1988 and divorced in 2014. She has two children and lives in the Sabin neighborhood of Portland.

== Electoral history ==
2018 Multnomah County Commission District 2 election
Party	Candidate	Votes	%
Nonpartisan	Susheela Jayapal	24,543	61.63%
Nonpartisan	Maria Garcia	5,883	14.77%
Nonpartisan	Bruce Broussard	4,980	12.51%
Nonpartisan	Sharon Y. Maxwell	4,336	10.89%
Other	Write-ins	81	0.20%
Total votes		39,823	100.00%
