= Jaipal Singh Law =

Former Indian civil servant

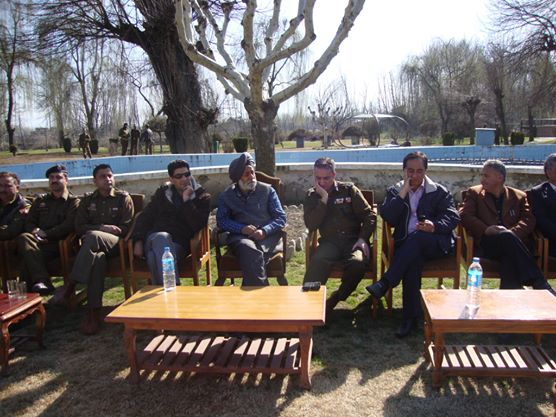
Jaipal Singh Law in Anantnag, 2014.

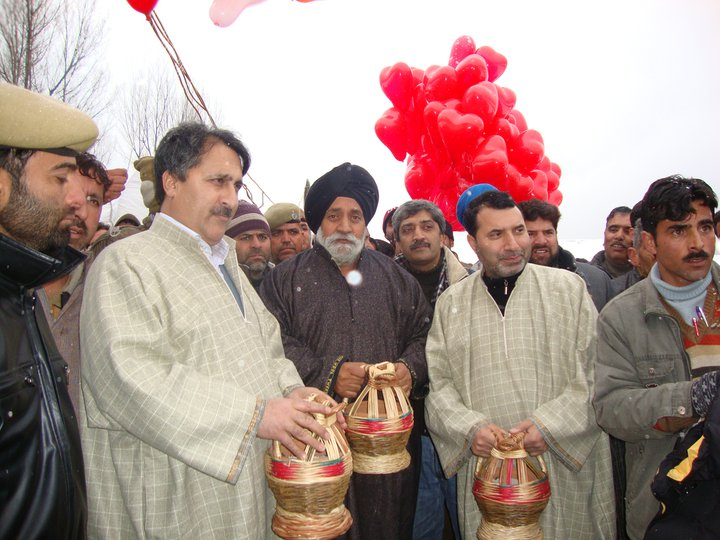
At the opening of a snow and culture festival

Jaipal Singh Law (also known as J.P. Singh) is a former public servant and a member of the Public Service Commission of the erstwhile semi-autonomous state of Jammu and Kashmir, a constitutional body under the erstwhile J&K constitution. A retired officer of the Jammu & Kashmir government in India who superannuated from service in 2014. He retired as the Director of The State's Technical Education Department and a Directors of the executive body of the All India Council For Technical Education (AICTE). He was the head of the Directorate General of YSS J&K and The Secretary of the Sports Council. He is the chairman of the School Games Federation of India (SGFI) legal committee, the head of the Hostel Development committee of the Youth Hostels Association Of India (YHAI) and holds positions in other semi-government bodies. He has served as DM in Anantnag and Rajouri districts over especially disturbed spells of time (2008–12). He is responsible for the successful conduct of the first Kashmir Premier League (Chinar Cup), the Amarnath Yatra, and for relief work after the 2005 Kashmir earthquake. He was the observer for the Ladakh Autonomous Hill Development Council, Leh (Autonomous administrative divisions of India) elections in 2013.

== Early life ==
Singh's elder brother is S.K.S Law (a retired IPS officer). Jaipal got a M.Phill. from the Jammu university in political science and played competitive hockey before joining the civil service.

== Career ==
Early in his career, he served as a Development Officer in North Kashmir, during peak militancy.

He was the Deputy commissioner/Collector of Rajouri District and Anantnag District of Kashmir. He was responsible for maintaining law and order in Anantnag as the District Magistrate during 2008 and 2010. Also was credited with coordinating the Amarnath Yatra for many years, in second in command and leading administrative capacities.

He held other posts such as Secretary of the J&K State Sports Council and the Director (Charged Director General) YSS J&K.

== Family ==
Singh is married to Ranjit Kaur, who works in the Department of School Education. He has one son.

== Recognition ==
- Prime Minister's Excellence Award For Public Administration (for relief work after the 2005 Kashmir earthquake).
- State Award for Meritorious Public Service.
- Civil society and Sikh honors.
