= Maya Jayapal =

Indian writer (born 1941)

- Born: Maya Menon; 1941 (age 84–85); Palakkad, Kerala, British Raj
- Education: Mount Carmel College, Bangalore
- Spouse: M. P. Jayapal (died 2025)
- Children: Susheela Jayapal; Pramila Jayapal

Maya Jayapal (née Menon; born 1941) is an Indian historian, author, columnist, teacher, and counselor.

== Early life and education ==
Maya Menon is a Malayali from Palakkad, Kerala, India. She moved from Chennai to Bengaluru to attend college in 1955, and graduated from Mount Carmel College, Bangalore. After her marriage to Muduvangad Puthanveetil Jayapal, she resided in Bengaluru for a decade before moving to Jakarta, Indonesia, for 11 years and then Singapore for 13 years. Since 1993, Jayapal has lived in Bengaluru.

== Career ==
Maya Jayapal is the author of several books, including Bangalore: Roots and Beyond and Bangalore: The Story of A City. Bangalore: The Story of A City was released in 1997 during the commemoration of the 460th anniversary of the city, and includes her research about the Victoria Hotel and the BRV theatre. The book was one of the first histories of Bengaluru that specifically connected to its present, while Bangalore: Roots and Beyond contains additional research and photographs. While residing in Singapore, Jayapal expanded presentations she gave on the history of Singapore into a book, Old Singapore, based on collections of letters and memoirs.

Jayapal has cited Jane Austen, Amitav Ghosh, and Yaa Gyasi as influences.

== Personal life ==
Her daughter, Pramila Jayapal, is a member of the U.S. House of Representatives and the first Indian-American woman elected to the House. Her elder daughter Susheela Jayapal resides in Portland, Oregon, and is the first Indian-American to serve on the Multnomah County Board of Commissioners.

Maya Jayapal lives in Langford Town in Bangalore.

== Works ==
- Old Singapore (1992)
- Old Jakarta (1993)
- Bangalore: The story of a city (1997)
- Bangalore: Roots and Beyond (2014)
