= List of most senior women in the United States Congress =

Seniority in both houses of the United States Congress is valuable as it confers a number of benefits and is based on length of continuous service, with ties broken by a series of factors. The following lists the most senior women in either or both houses of Congress, sometimes called the "dean of women" in either chamber.

== Synopsis ==
In the House, Edith Nourse Rogers, who served 35 years from 1925 to 1960 as one of the first women elected to Congress (and the first woman elected from Massachusetts), was the longest-serving female Representative upon her death in office in 1960. Her record was surpassed in 2018 by Marcy Kaptur of Ohio, who has served in the House since 1983.

In the Senate, Republican Margaret Chase Smith, who served for 23 years from 1949 to 1973 as a senator from Maine, was the longest-serving female Senator upon her retirement. Her record was surpassed in 2011 by Barbara Mikulski of Maryland, who served for 30 years from 1987 to 2017.

Across both houses of Congress, Rogers' 35 years of service from 1925 to 1960 was the longest for a female member when she died in office in 1960. Her record was surpassed in 2012 by Mikulski, who served a total of 40 years in Congress from 1977 to 2017 (10 years in the House of Representatives and 30 years in the Senate).

- Maxine Waters and Eleanor Holmes Norton, both inaugurated in 1991, are the longest-serving African-American women (and women of color) in the House.
- Patsy Mink, who was the dean of women in the House from 1997 to 2002, was the longest-serving Asian-American woman in the House (and Congress).
- Carol Moseley Braun is the longest-serving (and first) African-American woman in the Senate.
- Mazie Hirono is the longest-serving Asian American woman in the Senate.
- Ileana Ros-Lehtinen was the longest-serving Hispanic or Latina American woman in the House.
- Edith Nourse Rogers is the longest-serving Republican woman in the House.
- Catherine Cortez Masto is the longest-serving Hispanic or Latina American woman in the Senate.
- Tammy Baldwin is the longest-serving LGBT woman in both the House and Senate.
- Nita Lowey is the longest-serving Jewish-American woman in the House.
- Dianne Feinstein is the longest-serving (and first) Jewish-American woman in the Senate.
- Ilhan Omar and Rashida Tlaib, both inaugurated in 2019, are the first and longest-serving Muslim women in the House (and in Congress).

== Women of the House of Representatives ==
Image	Name (lifespan)	Party	District	Entered the House	Became most senior woman	Tenure ended	Total Tenure	Tenure as Dean	Notes
Rep. Rankin	Jeannette Rankin (1880–1973)	Republican	Montana at-large	March 4, 1917	Upon taking office	March 4, 1919	2 years, 0 days	2 years, 0 days	First woman elected to a national office Retired to run unsuccessfully for the Republican nomination for the United States Senate election in Montana, 1918; Later served another two-year term from January 3, 1941 –January 3, 1943
House vacant of women (March 4, 1919-March 4, 1921)
Rep. Robertson	Alice Robertson (1854–1931)	Republican	Oklahoma's 2nd	March 4, 1921	Upon taking office	March 4, 1923	2 years, 0 days	2 years, 0 days	First woman to defeat an incumbent congressman Lost reelection
Rep. Nolan	Mae Nolan (1886–1973)	Republican	California's 5th	January 23, 1923	March 4, 1923	March 4, 1925	2 years, 40 days	2 years, 0 days	Succeeded her husband Retired
Rep. Kahn	Florence Kahn (1866–1948)	Republican	California's 4th	March 4, 1925	Upon taking office	January 3, 1937	11 years, 305 days	11 years, 305 days	First woman to be reelected First Jewish woman elected Succeeded her husband Lost reelection
Rep. Norton	Mary Norton (1875–1959)	Democratic	New Jersey's 12th & 13th	March 4, 1925	January 3, 1937	January 3, 1951	25 years, 305 days	14 years, 0 days	First Democratic woman elected First woman to chair a standing committee (House District of Columbia Committee); Redistricted; Retired
Rep. Rogers	Edith Rogers (1881–1960)	Republican	Massachusetts's 5th	June 30, 1925	January 3, 1951	September 10, 1960	35 years, 72 days	9 years, 251 days	Succeeded her husband First Chair of the House Veterans' Affairs Committee; Second-longest serving woman in the House; Died in office
Rep. Bolton	Frances P. Bolton (1885–1977)	Republican	Ohio's 22nd	February 27, 1940	September 10, 1960	January 3, 1969	28 years, 311 days	8 years, 115 days	Succeeded her husband Lost reelection
Rep. Sullivan	Leonor Sullivan (1902–1988)	Democratic	Missouri's 3rd	January 3, 1953	January 3, 1969	January 3, 1977	24 years, 0 days	8 years, 0 days	Succeeded her husband (though not immediately); First woman Chair of the House Merchant Marine Committee; Retired
Rep. Heckler	Margaret Heckler (1931–2018)	Republican	Massachusetts's 10th	January 3, 1967	January 3, 1977	January 3, 1983	16 years, 0 days	6 years, 0 days	Lost reelection Later became United States Secretary of Health and Human Services and United States Ambassador to Ireland
Rep. Holt	Marjorie Holt (1920–2018)	Republican	Maryland's 4th	January 3, 1973	January 3, 1983	January 3, 1987	14 years, 0 days	4 years, 0 days	Retired
Rep. Schroeder	Patricia Schroeder (1940–2023)	Democratic	Colorado's 1st	January 3, 1973	January 3, 1987	January 3, 1997	24 years, 0 days	10 years, 0 days	Retired
Rep. Mink	Patsy Mink (1927–2002)	Democratic	Hawaii's at-large & 2nd	January 3, 1965	January 3, 1997	January 3, 1977	24 years, 249 days	5 years, 268 days	First woman of color elected Redistricted; Ran for President of the United States in the Democratic Party presidential primaries, 1972 (Oregon only); First Asian American woman to run for President; Retired to run unsuccessfully for the Democratic nomination for the United States Senate election in Hawaii, 1976; Later became Assistant Secretary of State for Oceans and International Environmental and Scientific Affairs; First dean of color of women in Congress; Died in office
Rep. Mink	Patsy Mink (1927–2002)	Democratic	Hawaii's 2nd	September 22, 1990	January 3, 1997	September 28, 2002	24 years, 249 days	5 years, 268 days	First woman of color elected Redistricted; Ran for President of the United States in the Democratic Party presidential primaries, 1972 (Oregon only); First Asian American woman to run for President; Retired to run unsuccessfully for the Democratic nomination for the United States Senate election in Hawaii, 1976; Later became Assistant Secretary of State for Oceans and International Environmental and Scientific Affairs; First dean of color of women in Congress; Died in office
Rep. Roukema	Marge Roukema (1929–2014)	Republican	New Jersey's 7th & 5th	January 3, 1981	September 28, 2002	January 3, 2003	22 years, 0 days	97 days	Redistricted; Retired
Rep. Johnson	Nancy Johnson (born 1935)	Republican	Connecticut's 6th & 5th	January 3, 1983	January 3, 2003	January 3, 2007	24 years, 0 days	4 years, 0 days	Redistricted; Lost reelection
Rep. Kaptur	Marcy Kaptur (born 1946)	Democratic	Ohio's 9th	January 3, 1983	January 3, 2007	present	43 years, 311 days	19 years, 311 days	Current dean of women in Congress; Longest-serving woman in the House; Most senior female representative ever (#4 on the seniority list)

== Women of the Senate ==
Image	Name (lifespan)	Party	State	Entered the Senate	Became most senior woman	Tenure ended	Total Tenure	Tenure as Dean	Notes
Sen. Felton	Rebecca Felton (1835–1930)	Democratic	Georgia	November 21, 1922	Upon taking office	November 22, 1922	1 day	1 day	First woman to serve in the Senate; Appointment ended
Senate vacant of women (November 22, 1922–December 9, 1931)
Sen. Caraway	Hattie Caraway (1878–1950)	Democratic	Arkansas	December 9, 1931	Upon taking office	January 3, 1945	13 years, 25 days	13 years, 25 days	First woman to win reelection to the Senate; Lost renomination
Senate vacant of women (January 3, 1945–October 6, 1948)
Sen. Bushfield	Vera C. Bushfield (1889–1976)	Republican	South Dakota	October 6, 1948	Upon taking office	December 26, 1948	81 days	81 days	First Republican woman to serve in the Senate; Appointment ended
Senate vacant of women (December 26, 1948–January 3, 1949)
Sen. Smith	Margaret C. Smith (1897–1995)	Republican	Maine	January 3, 1949	Upon taking office	January 3, 1973	24 years, 0 days	24 years, 0 days	Lost reelection
Senate vacant of women (January 3, 1973–January 25, 1978)
Sen. Humphrey	Muriel Humphrey (1912–1998)	Democratic	Minnesota	January 25, 1978	Upon taking office	November 7, 1978	286 days	286 days	Appointment ended
Senate vacant of women (November 7, 1978–December 23, 1978)
Sen. Kassebaum	Nancy Kassebaum (1932–2026)	Republican	Kansas	December 23, 1978	Upon taking office	January 3, 1997	18 years, 11 days	18 years, 11 days	Retired
Sen. Mikulski	Barbara Mikulski (born 1936)	Democratic	Maryland	January 3, 1987	January 3, 1997	January 3, 2017	30 years, 0 days	20 years, 0 days	Retired
Sen. Feinstein	Dianne Feinstein (1933–2023)	Democratic	California	November 10, 1992	January 3, 2017	September 28, 2023	30 years, 322 days	6 years, 268 days	Died in office
Sen. Murray	Patty Murray (born 1950)	Democratic	Washington	January 3, 1993	September 28, 2023	present	33 years, 311 days	3 years, 43 days	Longest-serving woman in the Senate; Most senior female senator ever (#3 on the seniority list); First female president pro tempore

== Most senior by party ==
=== Combined ===
==== Total ====
Name	State	Start	End	Total Tenure (Congressional)
Jeannette Rankin	Montana	1917	1919	4 years, 0 days (Note: Rankin served in the House from March 4, 1917 – March 4, 1919 and January 3, 1941 – January 3, 1943, which was not enough to regain total Congressional or House seniority.)
Vacant		1919	1921	2 years, 0 days
Alice Robertson	Oklahoma	1921	1923	2 years, 0 days
Mae Nolan	California	1923	1925	2 years, 40 days
Florence Kahn	California	1925 (Note: Kahn and Norton both started in the House on March 4, 1925, where Kahn technically ranked higher in seniority by alphabetical order.)	1937	11 years, 305 days
Mary Norton	New Jersey	1925	1937	25 years, 305 days
Mary Norton	New Jersey	1937	1951	25 years, 305 days
Edith Rogers	Massachusetts	1951	1960	35 years, 72 days
Margaret Smith	Maine	1960	1973	32 years, 214 days (Note: Smith served in the House from June 3, 1940 – January 3, 1949 and the Senate from January 3, 1949 – January 3, 1973. Her combined seniority is based on this total congressional tenure.)
Leonor Sullivan	Missouri	1973	1977	24 years, 0 days
Margaret Heckler	Massachusetts	1977	1983	16 years, 0 days
Marjorie Holt	Maryland	1983 (Note: Holt and Schroeder both started in the House on January 3, 1973, where Holt technically ranked higher in seniority by alphabetical order.)	1987	14 years, 0 days
Pat Schroeder	Colorado	1983	1987	24 years, 0 days
Pat Schroeder	Colorado	1987	1997	24 years, 0 days
Barbara Mikulski	Maryland	1997	2017	40 years, 0 days (Note: Mikulski served in the House from January 3, 1977 – January 3, 1987 and the Senate from January 3, 1987 – January 3, 2017. Her combined seniority is based on this total congressional tenure.)
Marcy Kaptur	Ohio	2017	present	43 years, 311 days

==== Democratic ====
Name	State	Start	End	Total Tenure (Congressional)
Rebecca Felton	Georgia	1922	1922	1 day
Vacant		1922	1925	2 years, 102 days
Mary Norton	New Jersey	1925	1951	25 years, 305 days
Reva Bosone	Utah	1951	1953	4 years, 0 days
Edna Kelly	New York	1953	1969	19 years, 56 days
Leonor Sullivan	Missouri	1969	1977	24 years, 0 days
Shirley Chisholm	New York	1977	1983	14 years, 0 days
Pat Schroeder	Colorado	1983	1997	24 years, 0 days
Barbara Mikulski	Maryland	1997	2017	40 years, 0 days
Marcy Kaptur	Ohio	2017	present	43 years, 311 days

==== Republican ====
Name	State	Start	End	Total Tenure (Congressional)
Jeannette Rankin	Montana	1917	1919	4 years, 0 days
Vacant		1919	1921	2 years, 0 days
Alice Robertson	Oklahoma	1921	1923	2 years, 0 days
Mae Nolan	California	1923	1925	2 years, 40 days
Florence Kahn	California	1925	1937	11 years, 305 days
Edith Rogers	Massachusetts	1937	1960	35 years, 72 days
Margaret Smith	Maine	1960	1973	32 years, 214 days
Margaret Heckler	Massachusetts	1973	1983	16 years, 0 days
Marjorie Holt	Maryland	1983	1987	14 years, 0 days
Virginia Smith	Nebraska	1987	1991	16 years, 0 days
Olympia Snowe	Maine	1991	2013	34 years, 0 days (Note: Snowe served in the House from January 3, 1979 – January 3, 1995 and the Senate from January 3, 1995 – January 3, 2013. Her combined seniority is based on this total congressional tenure.)
Ileana Ros-Lehtinen	Florida	2013	2019	29 years, 127 days
Kay Granger	Texas	2019 (Note: Granger and Collins both started in Congress on January 3, 1997, with Granger in the House and Collins in the Senate.)	2025	28 years, 0 days
Susan Collins	Maine	2019	2025	29 years, 311 days
Susan Collins	Maine	2025	present	29 years, 311 days

=== House ===
==== Democratic ====
Name	State	Start	End	Total Tenure (House)
Mary Norton	New Jersey	1925	1951	25 years, 305 days
Reva Bosone	Utah	1951	1953	4 years, 0 days
Edna Kelly	New York	1953	1969	19 years, 56 days
Leonor Sullivan	Missouri	1969	1977	24 years, 0 days
Shirley Chisholm	New York	1977	1983	14 years, 0 days
Pat Schroeder	Colorado	1983	1997	24 years, 0 days
Patsy Mink	Hawaii	1997	2002	24 years, 249 days (Note: Mink served in the House at two different periods: January 3, 1965 – January 3, 1977 and September 22, 1990 – September 28, 2002. Her seniority is based on her combined tenure. The longest continually serving House Democratic woman on January 3, 1997 was Barbara Kennelly, who served from January 12, 1982 to January 3, 1999, and would have then been followed by Kaptur in seniority.)
Marcy Kaptur	Ohio	2002	present	43 years, 311 days

==== Republican ====
Name	State	Start	End	Total Tenure (House)
Jeannette Rankin	Montana	1917	1919	4 years, 0 days
Vacant		1919	1921	2 years, 0 days
Alice Robertson	Oklahoma	1921	1923	2 years, 0 days
Mae Nolan	California	1923	1925	2 years, 40 days
Florence Kahn	California	1925	1937	11 years, 305 days
Edith Rogers	Massachusetts	1937	1960	35 years, 72 days
Frances Bolton	Ohio	1960	1969	28 years, 311 days
Florence Dwyer	New Jersey	1969	1973	16 years, 0 days
Margaret Heckler	Massachusetts	1973	1983	16 years, 0 days
Marjorie Holt	Maryland	1983	1987	14 years, 0 days
Virginia Smith	Nebraska	1987	1991	16 years, 0 days
Olympia Snowe	Maine	1991	1995	16 years, 0 days
Marge Roukema	New Jersey	1995	2003	22 years, 0 days
Nancy Johnson	Connecticut	2003	2007	24 years, 0 days
Ileana Ros-Lehtinen	Florida	2007	2019	29 years, 127 days
Kay Granger	Texas	2019	2025	28 years, 0 days
Virginia Foxx	North Carolina	2025	present	21 years, 311 days

=== Senate ===
==== Democratic ====
Name	State	Start	End	Total Tenure (Senate)
Rebecca Felton	Georgia	1922	1922	1 day
Vacant		1922	1931	8 years, 356 days
Hattie Caraway	Arkansas	1931	1945	13 years, 51 days
Vacant		1945	1960	15 years, 311 days
Maurine Neuberger	Oregon	1960	1967	6 years, 55 days
Vacant		1967	1972	5 years, 211 days
Elaine Edwards	Louisiana	1972	1972	104 days
Vacant		1972	1978	5 years, 73 days
Muriel Humphrey	Minnesota	1978	1978	286 days
Vacant		1978	1987	8 years, 57 days
Barbara Mikulski	Maryland	1987	2017	30 years, 0 days
Dianne Feinstein	California	2017	2023	30 years, 329 days
Patty Murray	Washington	2023	present	33 years, 311 days

==== Republican ====
Name	State	Start	End	Total Tenure (Senate)
Gladys Pyle	South Dakota	1938	1939	55 days
Vacant		1939	1948	9 years, 358 days
Vera Bushfield	South Dakota	1948	1948	81 days
Vacant		1948	1949	8 days
Margaret Smith	Maine	1949	1973	24 years, 0 days
Vacant		1973	1978	5 years, 354 days
Nancy Kassebaum	Kansas	1978	1997	18 years, 11 days
Kay Hutchison	Texas	1997	2013	19 years, 203 days
Susan Collins	Maine	2013	present	29 years, 311 days

== See also ==
- Mother of the House
- Women in the United States Senate
- Women in the United States House of Representatives
- Congressional Caucus for Women's Issues
- Democratic Women's Caucus
- Republican Women's Caucus
