= Women in the United States House of Representatives =

Female members of the U.S. House of Representatives

Women have served in the United States House of Representatives, the lower chamber of the United States Congress, since 1917 following the election of Republican Jeannette Rankin from Montana, the first woman in Congress. In 2007, Nancy Pelosi was elected the first woman to serve as Speaker of the House.

Mississippi is the only state that has never sent a woman to the House, although it has to the Senate.

== Firsts ==
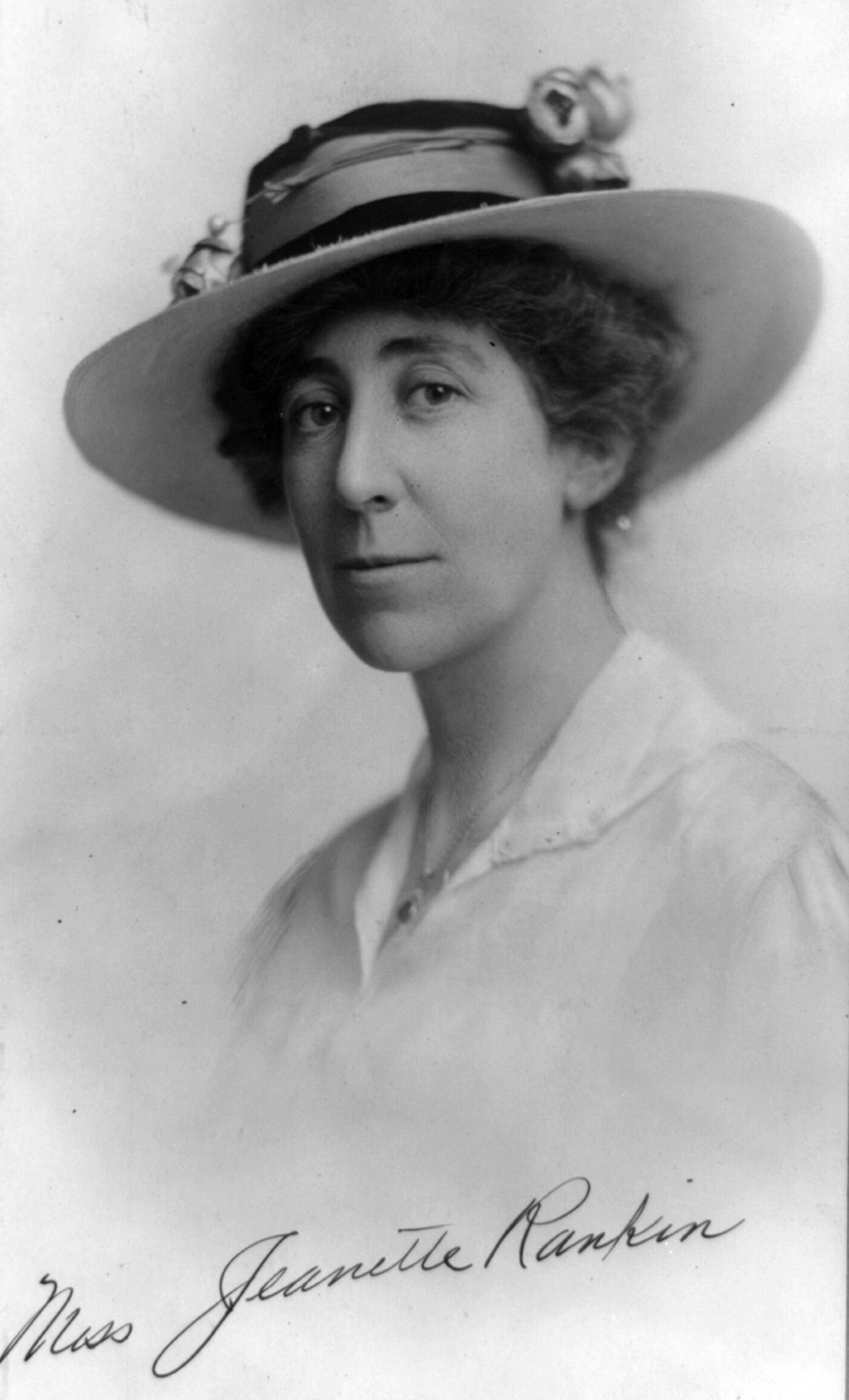
Jeannette Rankin became the first woman to be elected to Congress, in the 1916 House elections.

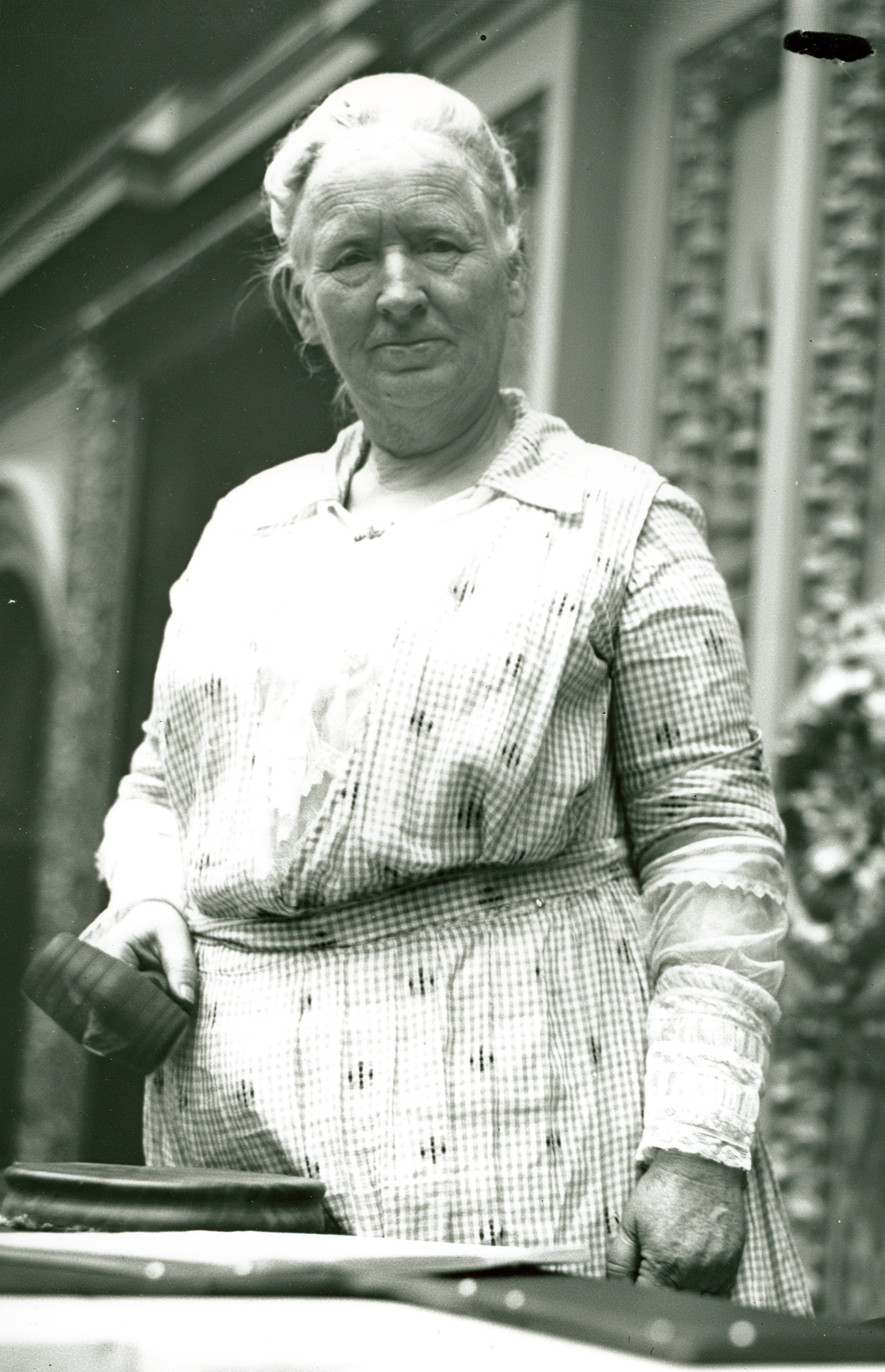
Alice Robertson became the first woman to preside over the House of Representatives, on June 20, 1921.

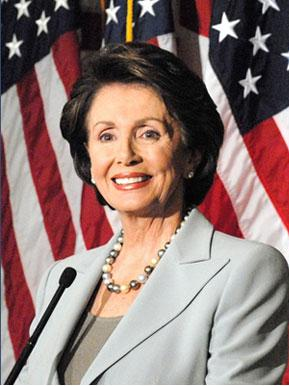
Nancy Pelosi was elected the first woman to serve as Speaker of the House in 2007.

The first woman to be elected to Congress was Montana's Jeannette Rankin, a Republican, in the 1916 House elections; notably, this occurred before the ratification of the 19th Amendment in 1920, which prohibits the federal government or any state from denying citizens the right to vote on the basis of sex. On April 2, 1917, she took her oath of office along with the other members of the 65th Congress.

Mae Nolan entered the House of Representatives in 1923 as the first Catholic woman in either chamber of Congress. Clare Boothe Luce, who converted to the Catholic Church in 1946 before retiring as a Congresswoman, was the first female Catholic convert in either chamber.

Florence Prag Kahn entered the House of Representatives in 1925 as the first Jewish and thus non-Christian woman in either chamber of Congress.

Margaret Chase Smith became the first woman elected in both chambers of Congress; she first entered the House of Representatives in 1940, before her election into the Senate in 1948.

Representative Vera Buchanan died in 1955, making her the first woman in either chamber of Congress to die in office.

Patsy Mink, an Asian American, entered the House of Representatives in 1965 as the first woman of color in either chamber of Congress.

Shirley Chisholm entered the House of Representatives in 1969 as the first African-American woman in either chamber of Congress.

In 1969, Representative Charlotte Reid became the first woman to wear pants in the House of Representatives or Senate.

In 1973, Representative Yvonne Brathwaite Burke became the first member of either the House of Representatives or Senate to give birth while in office, and she was the first member of Congress to be granted maternity leave, with the birth of her daughter Autumn.

Mary Rose Oakar in 1977 became the first Arab-American woman elected to Congress, being elected to the House of Representatives.

The gym of the House of Representatives (with the exception of its swimming pool) first opened to women in 1985, the gym having previously been male-only. The swimming pool opened to women in 2009, the pool having previously been male-only.

Apart from single-member House delegations, the first all-woman delegation in either chamber of Congress was from Hawaii, in late 1990—Pat Saiki and Patsy Mink. They were also the first all-woman of color delegation in either chamber. In 2013, New Hampshire became the first state to have an all-woman delegation in both houses of Congress.

Enid Greene Waldholtz entered the House of Representatives in 1995 as the first Mormon woman in that chamber; however, she was the second Mormon woman in Congress, after Senator Paula Hawkins of Florida.

Jo Ann Emerson entered the House of Representatives in 1997 as the first and, so far, only woman (re)elected as neither a Democrat nor a Republican from any state to either chamber of Congress. She won two elections scheduled on November 5, 1996: a special election to fill out the remainder of her husband's term in the 104th Congress, and a general election for a full term in the 105th Congress. Emerson received the Republican nomination for the unexpired term; however, the party slot for the regular election was already filled by another contender. According to Missouri law, she was ineligible to run as a GOP candidate, so she sought reelection and won her first full term as an independent.

Tammy Baldwin, a lesbian, became in 1998 the first openly gay non-incumbent elected to the House of Representatives, and the first open lesbian elected to Congress.

Nancy Pelosi, a Democrat, rose through the ranks of her party leadership to be elected House whip in 2002, before being elevated to House floor leader and minority leader the following year; making her both the first woman whip and the first woman floor leader in either chamber of Congress. On January 4, 2007, she was elected the first woman to serve as Speaker of the House. On January 3, 2019, Pelosi became the seventh person and first woman to reclaim the speakership.

Mazie Hirono entered the House of Representatives in 2007 as one of the first two Buddhists (alongside Hank Johnson) and first Buddhist woman elected in either chamber of Congress.

In 2011, the House of Representatives got its first women's bathroom near the chamber (Room H-211 of the Capitol building); women in the Senate have had their own restroom off the Senate floor since 1993.

Tammy Duckworth, an Iraq War combat veteran, entered the House of Representatives in 2013 as the first woman with a disability in either chamber of Congress.

Tulsi Gabbard entered the House of Representatives in 2013 as the first Hindu person in either chamber of Congress. Kyrsten Sinema also entered the House that same year as the first openly bisexual person in either chamber of Congress.

In the 2018 House elections, there was a wave of firsts elected to the House of Representatives for the 116th Congress. A record-breaking 103 women were elected or reelected to the House, causing many to call it the "Year of the Woman" in a reference to the first such year, the 1992 Senate elections. Sharice Davids and Deb Haaland became the first Native American women ever elected to either house of Congress. Ilhan Omar and Rashida Tlaib became the first Muslim women elected to either chamber, with Tlaib the first Palestinian-American woman elected to Congress and Omar the first Somali-American of either sex to be elected. Angie Craig became the first lesbian mother to be elected. Additionally, Alexandria Ocasio-Cortez and Donna Shalala became, respectively, the youngest woman ever elected to Congress and the oldest woman to be elected to Congress for the first time.

Also in 2018, Jacky Rosen became the first freshman congresswoman to be elected to the Senate.

In 2020, Republican Stephanie Bice was elected to become the first Persian American, Pakistani American, and first woman of Persian parentage and Pakistani ancestry in Congress, and her fellow Republican, Yvette Herrell, was also elected as the first Native American woman from the party in Congress. Additionally, Republicans Michelle Steel and Young Kim, and Democrat Marilyn Strickland were the first Korean-American women elected. Strickland is also the first Afro-Asian woman elected to the House of Representatives.

Mary Peltola entered the House of Representatives on September 13, 2022, after winning a special election on August 16, as the first Alaska Native person in either chamber of Congress.

In 2024, Sarah McBride was elected to the House, becoming the first openly transgender person ever elected to either chamber of Congress. Her membership in the House was not well received by some of her Republican colleagues, as they referred to her as "the gentleman from Delaware" or as "Mr. McBride". Even prior to the commencement of her service, Republican Speaker of the House, Mike Johnson, issued a ruling limiting the use of women's restrooms in the House to biological females, which had the effect of barring McBride from using the women's restrooms in the House.

== Length of service ==
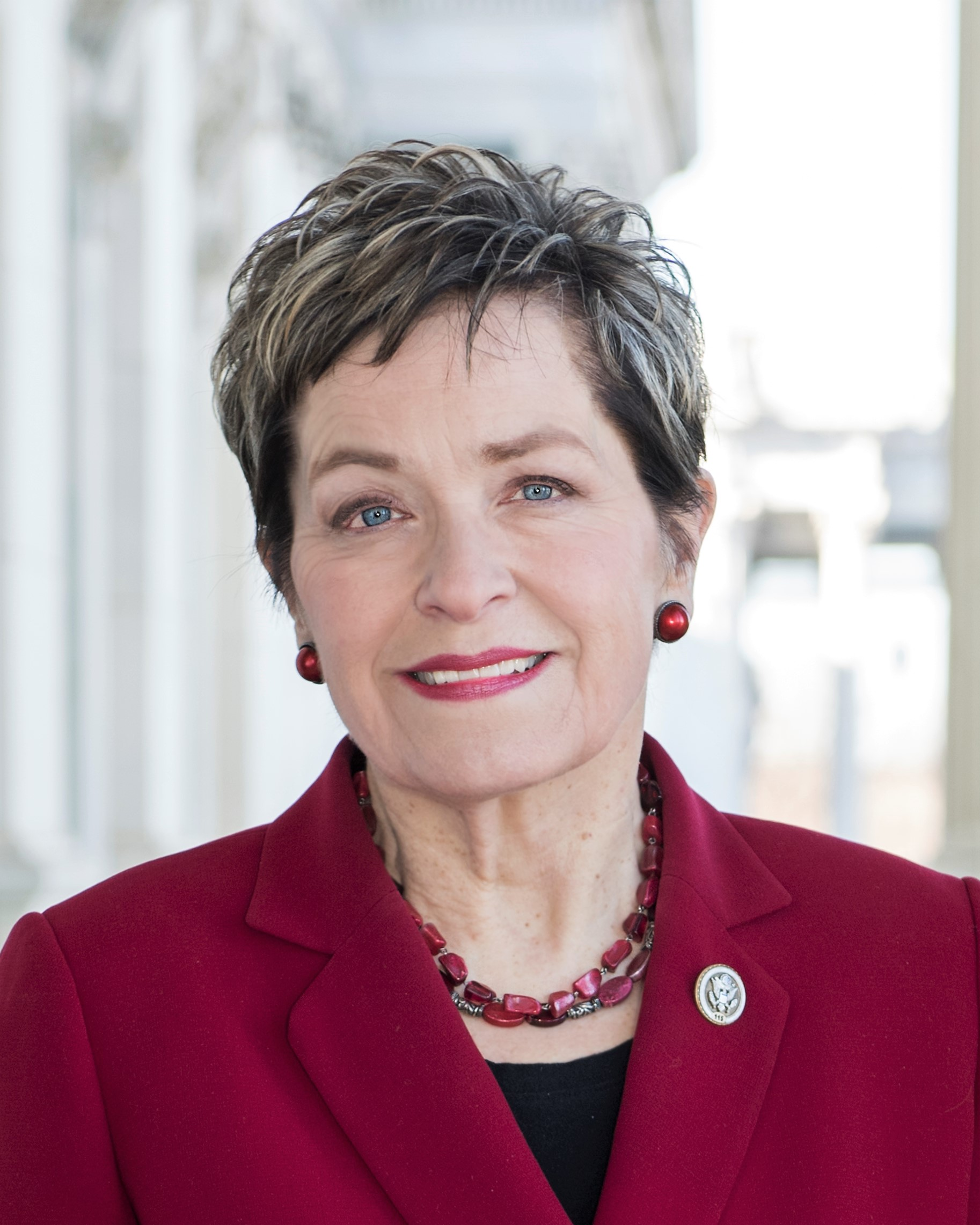
Representative Marcy Kaptur, the longest serving woman in the chamber's history, has served since 1983.

Representative Marcy Kaptur, who has served in the House since January 3, 1983, has the longest-serving tenure of any female member in the chamber's history. In 2018, she surpassed the record previously held by Edith Nourse Rogers, who served in the House from 1925 until her death in 1960. She went on to in 2023 surpass the record previously held by Barbara Mikulski, who served in the House and Senate for a combined 40 years, thus making her the longest-serving woman in congressional history.

== List of jurisdictions represented by women ==
=== States ===
State	Current members	Previous members	Total	First female member	Political party of first female member	Years with female members
Alabama	1	2	3	Elizabeth B. Andrews	Democratic	1972–1973, 2011–present
Alaska	0	1	1	Mary Peltola	Democratic	2022–2025
Arizona	2	7	9	Isabella Greenway	Democratic	1933–1937, 1993–1995, 2007–present
Arkansas	0	4	4	Pearl Oldfield	Democratic	1929–1933, 1961–1963, 1993–1997
California	16	35	51	Mae Nolan	Republican	1923–1937, 1945–1951, 1973–1979, 1981–present
Colorado	3	5	8	Pat Schroeder	Democratic	1973–present
Connecticut	2	6	8	Clare Boothe Luce	Republican	1943–1947, 1949–1951, 1971–1975, 1982–present
Delaware	1	1	2	Lisa Blunt Rochester	Democratic	2017–present
Florida	8	16	24	Ruth Owen	Democratic	1929–1933, 1989–present
(Georgia (U.S. state)) Georgia	2	7	9	Florence Gibbs	Democratic	1940–1941, 1946–1947, 1955–1963, 1993–2007, 2017–present
Hawaii	1	5	6	Patsy Mink	Democratic	1965–1977, 1987–2002, 2007–2021, 2023–present
Idaho	0	2	2	Gracie Pfost	Democratic	1953–1963, 1995–2001
Illinois	6	15	21	Winnifred Huck	Republican	1922–1923, 1929–1931, 1939–1947, 1951–1971, 1973–1997, 1999–present
Indiana	2	7	9	Virginia E. Jenckes	Democratic	1933–1939, 1949–1959, 1982–1985, 1989–1995, 1997–2007, 2013–present
Iowa	2	2	4	Cindy Axne & Abby Finkenauer	Democratic	2019–present
Kansas	1	5	6	Kathryn O'Loughlin McCarthy	Democratic	1933–1935, 1975–1979, 1985–1997, 2007–present
Kentucky	0	2	2	Katherine G. Langley	Republican	1927–1931, 1997–2007
Louisiana	1	2	3	Lindy Boggs	Democratic	1973–1991, 2021–present
Maine	1	2	3	Margaret Chase Smith	Republican	1940–1949, 1979–1995, 2009–present
Maryland	2	8	10	Katharine Byron	Democratic	1941–1943, 1973–2003, 2008–2017, 2025–present
Massachusetts	3	4	7	Edith Rogers	Republican	1925–1960, 1967–1983, 2007–present
Michigan	6	10	16	Ruth Thompson	Republican	1951–1974, 1995–present
Mississippi	0	0	0			
Minnesota	5	2	7	Coya Knutson	Democratic–Farmer–Labor	1955–1959, 2001–present
Missouri	1	7	8	Leonor Sullivan	Democratic	1953–1977, 1991–present
Montana	0	1	1	Jeannette Rankin	Republican	1917–1919, 1941–1943
Nebraska	0	1	1	Virginia Smith	Republican	1975–1991
Nevada	2	3	5	Barbara Vucanovich	Republican	1983–1997, 1999–present
New Hampshire	1	2	3	Carol Shea-Porter	Democratic	2007–2011, 2013–present
New Jersey	3	7	10	Mary Norton	Democratic	1925–1951, 1957–1973, 1975–2003, 2015–present
New Mexico	2	6	8	Georgia Lusk	Democratic	1947–1949, 1998–2009, 2013–present
(New York (state)) New York	8	22	30	Ruth Pratt	Republican	1929–1945, 1947–1983, 1987–present
North Carolina	4	5	9	Eliza Pratt	Democratic	1946–1947, 1992–present
North Dakota	1	0	1	Julie Fedorchak	Republican	2025–present
Ohio	4	9	13	Frances P. Bolton	Republican	1940–1969, 1977–present
Oklahoma	1	3	4	Alice Robertson	Republican	1921–1923, 2007–2011, 2019–present
Oregon	5	5	10	Nan Honeyman	Democratic	1937–1939, 1955–1974, 1993–2009, 2012–present
Pennsylvania	4	8	12	Veronica Boland	Democratic	1942–1943, 1951–1963, 1993–1995, 2001–2015, 2018–present
Rhode Island	0	1	1	Claudine Schneider	Republican	1981–1991
South Carolina	2	5	7	Elizabeth Gasque	Democratic	1938–1941, 1944–1945, 1962–1963, 1987–1993, 2021–present
South Dakota	0	2	2	Stephanie Herseth Sandlin	Democratic	2004–2019
Tennessee	1	6	7	Willa Eslick	Democratic	1932–1933, 1961–1965, 1975–1995, 2003–2019, 2021–present
Texas	7	7	14	Lera Thomas	Democratic	1966–1967, 1973–1979, 1993–present
Utah	1	4	5	Reva Bosone	Democratic	1949–1953, 1993–1997, 2015–2019, 2023–present
Vermont	1	0	1	Becca Balint	Democratic	2023–present
Virginia	2	7	9	Leslie Byrne	Democratic	1993–1995, 2001–2009, 2015–present
(Washington (state)) Washington	6	8	14	Catherine May	Republican	1959–1974, 1989–present
West Virginia	1	2	3	Elizabeth Kee	Democratic	1951–1965, 2001–2015, 2019–present
Wisconsin	1	1	2	Tammy Baldwin	Democratic	1999–present
Wyoming	1	3	4	Barbara Cubin	Republican	1995–present

=== Territories and the District of Columbia ===
Territory	Current members	Previous members	Total	First female member	Political party of first female member	Years with female members
American Samoa	1	0	1	Amata Radewagen	Republican	2015–present
(Washington, D.C.) District of Columbia	1	0	1	Eleanor Holmes Norton	Democratic	1991–present
Guam	0	1	1	Madeleine Bordallo	Democratic	2003–2019
Hawaii Territory	N/A	1	1	Elizabeth P. Farrington	Republican	1954–1957
Northern Mariana Islands	1	0	1	Kimberlyn King-Hinds	Republican	2025–present
Puerto Rico	0	1	1	Jenniffer González-Colón	Republican	2017–2025
United States Virgin Islands	1	1	2	Donna Christian-Christensen	Democratic	1997–present

== Family ties and widow's succession ==
Winnifred Sprague Mason Huck of Illinois, the third woman ever elected to Congress, became the first woman followed into national office due to family connections. She succeeded her father into the House in the wake of his death in 1921; Huck won a special election to fill out the remainder of his term, but lost a primary election for renomination in her own right, so she served just 14 weeks. In 1990, Rep. Susan Molinari become the first woman elected to fill a vacancy caused by the resignation of her father rather than his death.

Mae Nolan of California becomes the first woman elected to Congress to fill the vacant seat caused by the death of her husband in 1922, which is sometimes known as the widow's succession. In the early years of women in Congress, such a seat was usually held only until the next general election, and the women retired after that single Congress, thereby becoming a placeholders to finishing elected terms of their husbands. As the years progressed, however, more and more of these widow successors sought reelection. These women began to win their own elections, with Florence Prag Kahn of California becoming the first woman to do it. After entering the House of Representatives in 1925 to replace her late husband, she established herself as an effective legislator in her own right and would go on to win reelection five more times. Rep. Debbie Dingell of Michigan succeeded her living spouse after his retirement, becoming the first woman to do it.

Frances P. Bolton of Ohio became the first woman overlapping a tenure with her child in either chamber of Congress. She served alongside her son in the House of Representatives from 1953 to 1957 and again from 1963 to 1965; making them the first mother-son team ever to be simultaneously elected.

In 1965, Elizabeth Kee of West Virginia became the first woman who directly preceded her own child in any chamber of Congress; event occurred after she stepped down from the House and her son was elected to a vacant seat. Congresswomen Loretta and Linda Sánchez, both of California, served along each other from 2003 to 2017; making them the first pair of sisters elected to either chamber.

To date, 45 women have directly succeeded their late husbands in Congress, with 38 of them seated in the House and eight in the Senate.

== Number of women ==
A map showing the female members of the house

=== Number of women in the U.S. House and Senate by Congress ===
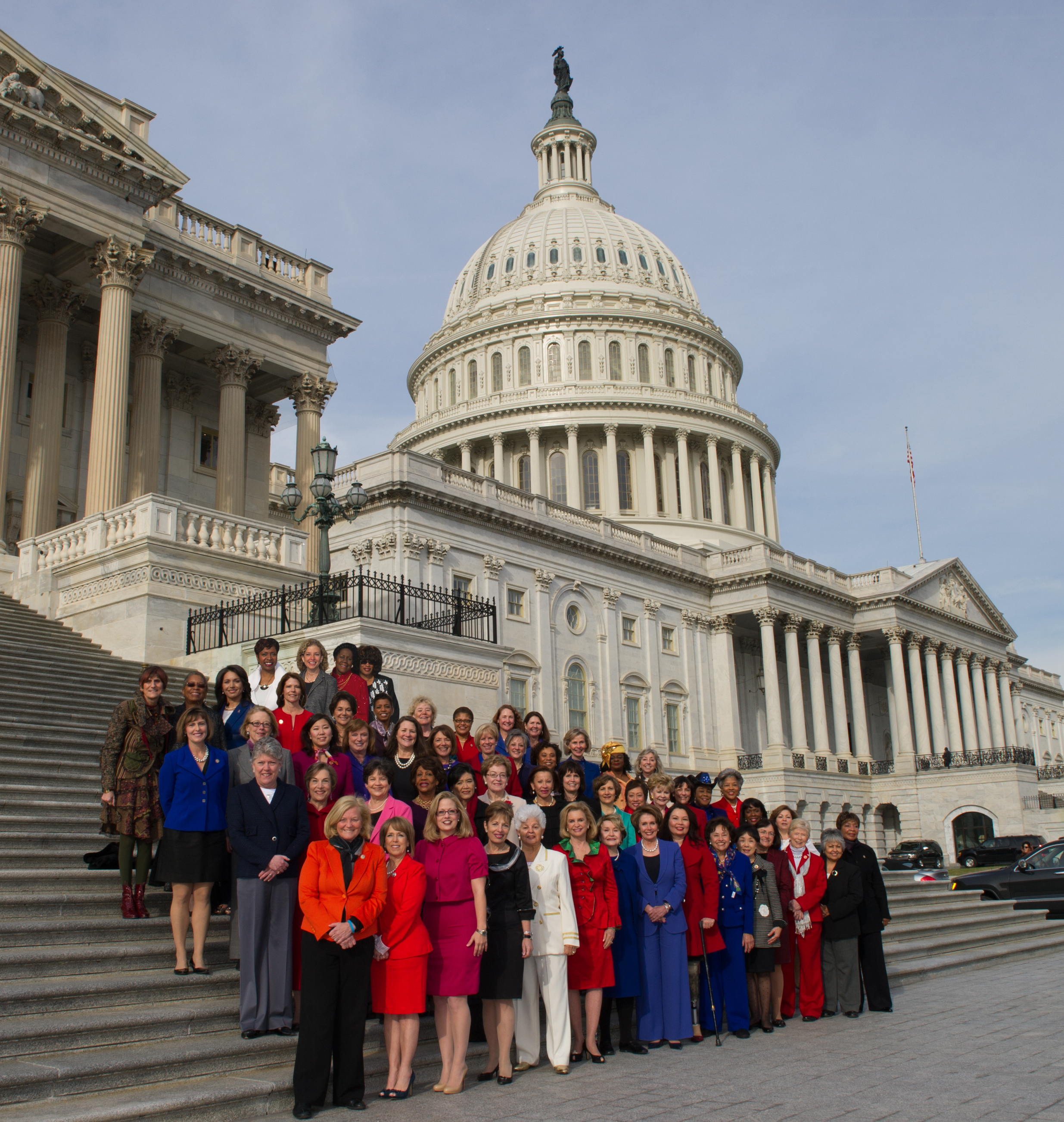
Women U.S. representatives of the 113th Congress Gender of the members of the House of Representatives.

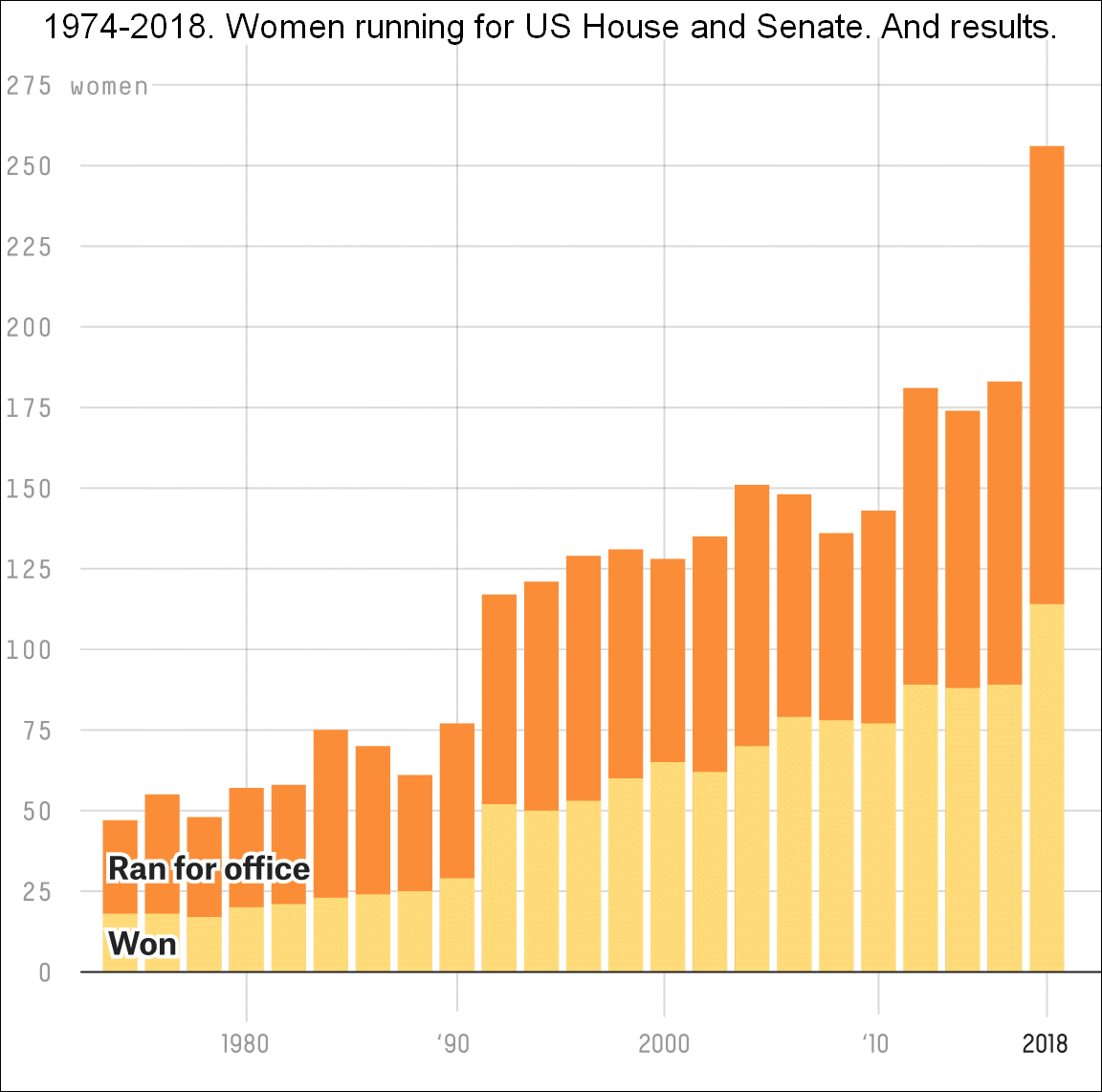
The number of women who sought and won election to Congress in each election cycle from 1974 to 2018.

Number of women in the United States Congress (1917–present):

Congress	Years	in Congress	%
65th	1917–1919	1	0.2%
66th	1919–1921	0	0%
67th	1921–1923	4	0.7%
68th	1923–1925	1	0.2%
69th	1925–1927	3	0.6%
70th	1927–1929	5	0.9%
71st	1929–1931	9	1.7%
72nd	1931–1933	8	1.5%
73rd	1933–1935	8	1.5%
74th	1935–1937	8	1.5%
75th	1937–1939	9	1.7%
76th	1939–1941	9	1.7%
77th	1941–1943	10	1.9%
78th	1943–1945	9	1.7%
79th	1945–1947	11	2.1%
80th	1947–1949	8	1.5%
81st	1949–1951	10	1.9%
82nd	1951–1953	11	2.1%
83rd	1953–1955	15	2.8%
84th	1955–1957	18	3.4%
85th	1957–1959	16	3.0%
86th	1959–1961	19	3.5%
87th	1961–1963	20	3.7%
88th	1963–1965	14	2.6%
89th	1965–1967	13	2.4%
90th	1967–1969	12	2.2%
91st	1969–1971	11	2.1%
92nd	1971–1973	15	2.8%
93rd	1973–1975	16	3.0%
94th	1975–1977	19	3.6%
95th	1977–1979	20	3.7%
96th	1979–1981	17	3.2%
97th	1981–1983	23	4.3%
98th	1983–1985	24	4.5%
99th	1985–1987	25	4.7%
100th	1987–1989	26	4.9%
101st	1989–1991	31	5.8%
102nd	1991–1993	33	6.2%
103rd	1993–1995	55	10.3%
104th	1995–1997	59	11.0%
105th	1997–1999	66	12.3%
106th	1999–2001	67	12.5%
107th	2001–2003	75	14.0%
108th	2003–2005	77	14.4%
109th	2005–2007	85	15.9%
110th	2007–2009	94	17.6%
111th	2009–2011	96	17.9%
112th	2011–2013	96	17.9%
113th	2013–2015	104	19.2%
114th	2015–2017	109	20.1%
115th	2017–2019	116	21.4%
116th	2019–2021	131	24.2%
117th	2021–2023	152	28.1%
118th	2023–2025	157	29.0%
119th	2025–2027	153	28.6%

=== Number of women in the U.S. House by party ===
Notes: "% of party" is taken from voting members at the beginning of the Congress, while numbers and "% of women" include all female House members of the given Congress

Congress	Years	Women total	Republicans	% of women	% of party	Democrats	% of women	% of party
65th	1917–1919	1	1	100%	0.5%	0	0.0%	0.0%
66th	1919–1921	0	0	0.0%	0.0%	0	0.0%	0.0%
67th	1921–1923	3	3	100%	0.3%	0	0.0%	0.0%
68th	1923–1925	1	1	100%	0.4%	0	0.0%	0.0%
69th	1925–1927	3	2	66.7%	0.4%	1	33.3%	0.5%
70th	1927–1929	5	3	60.0%	1.3%	2	40.0%	0.5%
71st	1929–1931	9	5	55.6%	1.9%	4	44.4%	1.8%
72nd	1931–1933	7	3	42.9%	1.4%	4	57.1%	1.4%
73rd	1933–1935	7	3	42.9%	1.7%	4	57.1%	1.0%
74th	1935–1937	6	2	33.3%	1.9%	4	66.7%	1.2%
75th	1937–1939	6	1	16.7%	1.1%	5	83.3%	1.2%
76th	1939–1941	8	4	50.0%	1.2%	4	50.0%	0.8%
77th	1941–1943	9	5	55.6%	3.1%	4	44.4%	0.7%
78th	1943–1945	8	6	75.0%	2.9%	2	25.0%	0.5%
79th	1945–1947	11	5	45.5%	2.6%	6	54.5%	1.7%
80th	1947–1949	7	5	71.4%	2.0%	2	28.6%	1.1%
81st	1949–1951	9	4	44.4%	2.3%	5	55.6%	1.5%
82nd	1951–1953	10	6	60.0%	3.0%	4	40.0%	0.9%
83rd	1953–1955	12	7	58.3%	2.7%	5	41.7%	2.3%
84th	1955–1957	17	7	41.2%	3.0%	10	58.8%	3.4%
85th	1957–1959	15	6	40.0%	3.0%	9	60.0%	3.8%
86th	1959–1961	17	8	47.1%	5.2%	9	52.9%	2.8%
87th	1961–1963	18	7	38.9%	3.5%	11	61.1%	3.4%
88th	1963–1965	12	6	50.0%	2.8%	6	50.0%	2.3%
89th	1965–1967	11	4	36.4%	2.9%	7	63.6%	2.0%
90th	1967–1969	11	5	45.5%	2.7%	6	54.5%	2.4%
91st	1969–1971	10	4	40.0%	2.1%	6	60.0%	2.5%
92nd	1971–1973	13	3	23.1%	1.1%	10	76.9%	3.5%
93rd	1973–1975	16	2	12.5%	1.0%	14	87.5%	5.0%
94th	1975–1977	19	5	26.3%	2.8%	14	73.7%	4.8%
95th	1977–1979	18	5	27.8%	3.5%	13	72.2%	4.5%
96th	1979–1981	16	5	31.3%	3.2%	11	68.8%	4.0%
97th	1981–1983	21	10	47.6%	4.7%	11	52.4%	3.7%
98th	1983–1985	22	9	40.9%	5.5%	13	59.1%	4.4%
99th	1985–1987	23	11	47.8%	6.0%	12	52.2%	4.3%
100th	1987–1989	23	11	47.8%	6.0%	12	52.2%	4.3%
101st	1989–1991	29	13	44.8%	6.0%	16	55.2%	5.6%
102nd	1991–1993	30	9	30.0%	5.5%	21	70.0%	7.0%
103rd	1993–1995	48	12	25.0%	6.8%	36	75.0%	13.6%
104th	1995–1997	50	18	36.0%	7.4%	32	64.0%	14.7%
105th	1997–1999	56	17	30.4%	7.5%	39	69.6%	18.8%
106th	1999–2001	58	17	29.3%	7.6%	41	70.7%	18.5%
107th	2001–2003	62	18	29.0%	8.1%	44	71.0%	19.0%
108th	2003–2005	63	21	33.3%	9.2%	42	66.7%	18.5%
109th	2005–2007	71	25	35.2%	9.9%	46	64.8%	20.9%
110th	2007–2009	78	21	26.9%	9.9%	57	73.1%	20.2%
111th	2009–2011	79	17	21.5%	9.6%	62	78.5%	21.5%
112th	2011–2013	79	24	30.4%	9.9%	55	69.6%	23.8%
113th	2013–2015	82	20	24.4%	8.2%	62	75.6%	29.0%
114th	2015–2017	88	23	26.2%	8.9%	65	73.8%	33.0%
115th	2017–2019	89	25	25.3%	8.7%	64	74.7%	32.0%
116th	2019–2021	101	13	12.9%	6.5%	88	87.1%	37.4%
117th	2021–2023	126	33	26.2%	14.6%	93	73.8%	41.2%
118th	2023–2025	128	33	25.8%	14.9%	95	74.2%	42.9%
119th	2025–2027	128	30	23.4%	13.7%	98	76.6%	44.2%

=== Percentage of women by party and year ===
Showing the data tabulated above (as of the 117th Congress) as a graph.

== List of female members by year service began ==
This is a complete list of women who have served as U.S. representatives or delegates of the United States House of Representatives. Members are grouped by the apportionment period during which such member commenced serving. This list includes women who served in the past and those who continue to serve in the present.

=== Between 1917 and 1932 ===
Name (lifespan)	Party	District	Start	End	Departure reason(s)
Jeannette Rankin (1880–1973)	Republican	Montana at-large	March 4, 1917	March 3, 1919	Retired to run unsuccessfully for the Republican nomination for the 1918 United States Senate election in Montana
Jeannette Rankin (1880–1973)	Republican	Montana's 1st	January 3, 1941	January 3, 1943	Retired
Alice Robertson (1854–1931)	Republican	Oklahoma's 2nd	March 4, 1921	March 3, 1923	Lost reelection
Winnifred Huck (1882–1936)	Republican	Illinois's at-large	November 7, 1922	March 3, 1923	Lost renomination
Mae Nolan (1886–1973)	Republican	California's 5th	January 23, 1923	March 3, 1925	Retired
Florence Kahn (1866–1948)	Republican	California's 4th	March 4, 1925	January 3, 1937	Lost reelection
Mary Norton (1875–1959)	Democratic	New Jersey's 12th & 13th	March 4, 1925	January 3, 1951	Retired
Edith Rogers (1881–1960)	Republican	Massachusetts's 5th	June 30, 1925	September 10, 1960	Died in office
Katherine G. Langley (1888–1948)	Republican	Kentucky's 7th	March 4, 1927	March 3, 1931	Retired
Pearl Oldfield (1876–1962)	Democratic	Arkansas's 2nd	January 9, 1929	March 3, 1931	Retired
Ruth McCormick (1880–1944)	Republican	Illinois's at-large	March 4, 1929	March 3, 1931	Retired to run unsuccessfully for the 1930 United States Senate election in Illinois
Ruth Owen (1885–1954)	Democratic	Florida's 4th	March 4, 1929	March 3, 1933	Lost renomination (Note: Later became United States Envoy to Denmark, making her the first woman chief of mission at the minister rank in U.S. diplomatic history)
Ruth Pratt (1877–1965)	Republican	New York's 17th	March 4, 1929	March 3, 1933	Lost reelection
Effiegene Wingo (1883–1962)	Democratic	Arkansas's 4th	November 4, 1930	March 3, 1933	Retired
Willa Eslick (1878–1961)	Democratic	Tennessee's 7th	August 14, 1932	March 3, 1933	Not eligible for reelection having not qualified for nomination

=== Between 1933 and 1942 ===
Name (lifespan)	Party	District	Start	End	Departure reason(s)
Virginia E. Jenckes (1877–1975)	Democratic	Indiana's 6th	March 4, 1933	January 3, 1939	Lost reelection
Kathryn O'Loughlin McCarthy (1894–1952)	Democratic	Kansas's 6th	March 4, 1933	January 3, 1935	Lost reelection
Isabella Greenway (1886–1953)	Democratic	Arizona's at-large	October 2, 1933	January 3, 1937	Retired
Marian W. Clarke (1880–1953)	Republican	New York's 34th	December 28, 1933	January 3, 1935	Retired
Caroline O'Day (1869–1943)	Democratic	New York's at-large	January 3, 1935	January 3, 1943	Retired
Nan Honeyman (1881–1970)	Democratic	Oregon's 3rd	January 3, 1937	January 3, 1939	Lost reelection
Elizabeth Gasque (1886–1989)	Democratic	South Carolina's 6th	September 13, 1938	January 3, 1939	Retired
Jessie Sumner (1898–1994)	Republican	Illinois's 18th	January 3, 1939	January 3, 1947	Retired
Clara G. McMillan (1894–1976)	Democratic	South Carolina's 1st	November 7, 1939	January 3, 1941	Retired
Frances P. Bolton (1885–1977)	Republican	Ohio's 22nd	February 27, 1940	January 3, 1969	Lost reelection
Margaret Chase Smith (1897–1995)	Republican	Maine's 2nd	June 3, 1940	January 3, 1949	Retired to run successfully for the 1948 United States Senate election in Maine, thus becoming the first woman to serve in both houses of the United States Congress, and the first woman to represent Maine in either.
Florence Gibbs (1890–1964)	Democratic	Georgia's 8th	October 1, 1940	January 3, 1941	Retired
Katharine Byron (1903–1976)	Democratic	Maryland's 6th	May 27, 1941	January 3, 1943	Retired
Veronica Boland (1899–1982)	Democratic	Pennsylvania's 11th	November 3, 1942	January 3, 1943	Retired

=== Between 1943 and 1952 ===
Name (lifespan)	Party	District	Start	End	Departure reason(s)
Clare Boothe Luce (1903–1987)	Republican	Connecticut's 4th	January 3, 1943	January 3, 1947	Retired
Winifred C. Stanley (1909–1996)	Republican	New York's at-large	January 3, 1943	January 3, 1945	Retired
Willa L. Fulmer (1884–1968)	Democratic	South Carolina's 2nd	November 7, 1944	January 3, 1945	Retired
Emily Douglas (1899–1994)	Democratic	Illinois's at-large	January 3, 1945	January 3, 1947	Lost reelection
Helen Gahagan Douglas (1900–1980)	Democratic	California's 14th	January 3, 1945	January 3, 1951	Retired to run unsuccessfully for the 1950 United States Senate election in California
Chase G. Woodhouse (1890–1984)	Democratic	Connecticut's 2nd	January 3, 1945	January 3, 1947	Lost reelection
Chase G. Woodhouse (1890–1984)	Democratic	Connecticut's 2nd	January 3, 1949	January 3, 1951	Lost reelection
Helen Mankin (1896–1956)	Democratic	Georgia's 5th	February 12, 1946	January 3, 1947	Lost renomination
Eliza Pratt (1902–1981)	Democratic	North Carolina's 8th	May 25, 1946	January 3, 1947	Retired
Georgia Lusk (1893–1971)	Democratic	New Mexico's at-large	January 3, 1947	January 3, 1949	Lost renomination
Katharine St. George (1894–1983)	Republican	New York's 29th, 28th, & 27th	January 3, 1947	January 3, 1965	Lost reelection
Reva Bosone (1895–1983)	Democratic	Utah's 2nd	January 3, 1949	January 3, 1953	Lost reelection
Cecil M. Harden (1894–1984)	Republican	Indiana's 6th	January 3, 1949	January 3, 1959	Lost reelection
Edna F. Kelly (1906–1997)	Democratic	New York's 10th & 12th	November 8, 1949	January 3, 1969	Lost renomination
Marguerite S. Church (1892–1990)	Republican	Illinois's 13th	January 3, 1951	January 3, 1963	Retired
Ruth Thompson (1887–1970)	Republican	Michigan's 9th	January 3, 1951	January 3, 1957	Lost renomination
Elizabeth Kee (1895–1975)	Democratic	West Virginia's 5th	July 17, 1951	January 3, 1965	Retired
Vera Buchanan (1902–1955)	Democratic	Pennsylvania's 33rd & 30th	July 24, 1951	October 26, 1955	Died in office

=== Between 1953 and 1962 ===
Name (lifespan)	Party	District	Start	End	Departure reason(s)
Gracie Pfost (1906–1965)	Democratic	Idaho's 1st	January 3, 1953	January 3, 1963	Retired to run unsuccessfully for the 1962 United States Senate election in Idaho
Leonor Sullivan (1902–1988)	Democratic	Missouri's 3rd	January 3, 1953	January 3, 1977	Retired
Elizabeth P. Farrington (1898–1984)	Republican	Hawaii's at-large	July 31, 1954	January 3, 1957	Lost reelection
Iris Blitch (1912–1993)	Democratic	Georgia's 8th	January 3, 1955	January 3, 1963	Retired
Edith Green (1910–1987)	Democratic	Oregon's 3rd	January 3, 1955	December 31, 1974	Resigned
Martha Griffiths (1912–2003)	Democratic	Michigan's 17th	January 3, 1955	December 31, 1974	Retired
Coya Knutson (1912–1996)	Democratic (DFL)	Minnesota's 9th	January 3, 1955	January 3, 1959	Lost reelection
Kathryn E. Granahan (1894–1979)	Democratic	Pennsylvania's 2nd	November 6, 1956	January 3, 1963	Retired
Florence P. Dwyer (1902–1976)	Republican	New Jersey's 6th & 12th	January 3, 1957	January 3, 1973	Retired
Catherine May (1914–2004)	Republican	Washington's 4th	January 3, 1959	January 3, 1971	Lost reelection
Edna O. Simpson (1891–1984)	Republican	Illinois's 20th	January 3, 1959	January 3, 1961	Retired
Jessica M. Weis (1901–1963)	Republican	New York's 38th	January 3, 1959	January 3, 1963	Retired
Julia Hansen (1907–1988)	Democratic	Washington's 3rd	November 8, 1960	December 31, 1974	Resigned
Catherine Norrell (1901–1981)	Democratic	Arkansas's 6th	April 19, 1961	January 3, 1963	Retired
Louise Reece (1898–1970)	Republican	Tennessee's 1st	May 16, 1961	January 3, 1963	Retired
Corinne Riley (1893–1979)	Democratic	South Carolina's 2nd	April 10, 1962	January 3, 1963	Retired

=== Between 1963 and 1972 ===
Name (lifespan)	Party	District	Start	End	Departure reason(s)
Charlotte Reid (1913–2007)	Republican	Illinois's 15th	January 3, 1963	October 7, 1971	Resigned to become a member of the Federal Communications Commission
Irene Baker (1901–1994)	Republican	Tennessee's 2nd	January 7, 1964	January 3, 1965	Retired
Patsy Mink (1927–2002)	Democratic	Hawaii's at-large & 2nd	January 3, 1965	January 3, 1977	Retired to run unsuccessfully for the Democratic nomination for the 1976 United States Senate election in Hawaii
Patsy Mink (1927–2002)	Democratic	Hawaii's 2nd	September 22, 1990	September 28, 2002	Died in office
Lera Thomas (1900–1993)	Democratic	Texas's 8th	March 26, 1966	January 3, 1967	Retired
Margaret Heckler (1931–2018)	Republican	Massachusetts's 10th	January 3, 1967	January 3, 1983	Lost reelection
Shirley Chisholm (1924–2005)	Democratic	New York's 12th	January 3, 1969	January 3, 1983	Retired
Bella Abzug (1920–1998)	Democratic	New York's 19th & 20th	January 3, 1971	January 3, 1977	Retired to run unsuccessfully for the Democratic nomination for the 1976 United States Senate election in New York
Ella Grasso (1919–1981)	Democratic	Connecticut's 6th	January 3, 1971	January 3, 1975	Retired to run successfully for the 1974 Connecticut gubernatorial election
Louise Hicks (1916–2003)	Democratic	Massachusetts's 9th	January 3, 1971	January 3, 1973	Lost reelection
Elizabeth B. Andrews (1911–2002)	Democratic	Alabama's 3rd	April 4, 1972	January 3, 1973	Retired

=== Between 1973 and 1982 ===
Name (lifespan)	Party	District	Start	End	Departure reason(s)
Yvonne Burke (born 1932)	Democratic	California's 37th & 28th	January 3, 1973	January 3, 1979	Retired to run unsuccessfully for Attorney General of California
Marjorie Holt (1920–2018)	Republican	Maryland's 4th	January 3, 1973	January 3, 1987	Retired
Elizabeth Holtzman (born 1941) (Note: Formerly the youngest woman elected to Congress (at age 31))	Democratic	New York's 16th	January 3, 1973	January 3, 1981	Retired to run unsuccessfully for the 1980 United States Senate election in New York
Barbara Jordan (1936–1996)	Democratic	Texas's 18th	January 3, 1973	January 3, 1979	Retired
Pat Schroeder (1940–2023)	Democratic	Colorado's 1st	January 3, 1973	January 3, 1997	Retired
Lindy Boggs (1916–2013)	Democratic	Louisiana's 2nd	March 20, 1973	January 3, 1991	Retired
Cardiss Collins (1931–2013)	Democratic	Illinois's 7th	June 5, 1973	January 3, 1997	Retired
Millicent Fenwick (1910–1992)	Republican	New Jersey's 5th	January 3, 1975	January 3, 1983	Retired to run unsuccessfully for the 1982 United States Senate election in New Jersey
Martha Keys (1930–2024)	Democratic	Kansas's 2nd	January 3, 1975	January 3, 1979	Lost reelection
Marilyn Lloyd (1929–2018)	Democratic	Tennessee's 3rd	January 3, 1975	January 3, 1995	Retired
Virginia Smith (1911–2006)	Republican	Nebraska's 3rd	January 3, 1975	January 3, 1991	Retired
Gladys Spellman (1918–1988)	Democratic	Maryland's 5th	January 3, 1975	February 24, 1981	After suffering a debilitating heart attack and slipping into a comatose state, her seat was declared vacant by the House
Helen Meyner (1929–1997)	Democratic	New Jersey's 13th	January 3, 1975	January 3, 1979	Lost reelection
Shirley Pettis (1924–2016)	Republican	California's 37th	April 29, 1975	January 3, 1979	Retired
Barbara Mikulski (born 1936) (Note: Shortest-statured woman in Congress, at 4 feet 11 inches (1.50 m))	Democratic	Maryland's 3rd	January 3, 1977	January 3, 1987	Retired to run successfully for the 1986 United States Senate election in Maryland
Mary Oakar (1940–2025)	Democratic	Ohio's 20th	January 3, 1977	January 3, 1993	Lost reelection
Beverly Byron (1932–2025)	Democratic	Maryland's 6th	January 3, 1979	January 3, 1993	Lost renomination
Geraldine Ferraro (1935–2011)	Democratic	New York's 9th	January 3, 1979	January 3, 1985	Retired to run unsuccessfully as the Democratic nominee for Vice President of the United States during the 1984 United States presidential election
Olympia Snowe (born 1947)	Republican	Maine's 2nd	January 3, 1979	January 3, 1995	Retired to run successfully for the 1994 United States Senate election in Maine
Bobbi Fiedler (1937–2019)	Republican	California's 21st	January 3, 1981	January 3, 1987	Retired to run unsuccessfully for the Republican nomination for the 1986 United States Senate election in California
Lynn Morley Martin (born 1939)	Republican	Illinois's 16th	January 3, 1981	January 3, 1991	Retired to run unsuccessfully for the 1990 United States Senate election in Illinois
Marge Roukema (1929–2014)	Republican	New Jersey's 7th & 5th	January 3, 1981	January 3, 2003	Retired
Claudine Schneider (born 1947)	Republican	Rhode Island's 2nd	January 3, 1981	January 3, 1991	Retired to run unsuccessfully for the 1990 United States Senate election in Rhode Island
Barbara B. Kennelly (born 1936)	Democratic	Connecticut's 1st	January 12, 1982	January 3, 1999	Retired to run unsuccessfully for the 1998 Connecticut gubernatorial election
Jean Spencer Ashbrook (born 1934)	Republican	Ohio's 17th	June 29, 1982	January 3, 1983	Retired
Katie Hall (1938–2012)	Democratic	Indiana's 1st	November 2, 1982	January 3, 1985	Lost renomination

=== Between 1983 and 1992 ===
Name (lifespan)	Party	District	Start	End	Departure reason(s)
Barbara Boxer (born 1940)	Democratic	California's 6th	January 3, 1983	January 3, 1993	Retired to run successfully for the 1992 United States Senate election in California
Nancy Johnson (born 1935)	Republican	Connecticut's 6th & 5th	January 3, 1983	January 3, 2007	Lost reelection
Marcy Kaptur (born 1946)	Democratic	Ohio's 9th	January 3, 1983	present	
Barbara Vucanovich (1921–2013)	Republican	Nevada's 2nd	January 3, 1983	January 3, 1997	Retired
Sala Burton (1925–1987)	Democratic	California's 5th	June 21, 1983	February 1, 1987	Died in office
Helen Delich Bentley (1923–2016)	Republican	Maryland's 2nd	January 3, 1985	January 3, 1995	Retired to run unsuccessfully for the Republican nomination for the 1994 Maryland gubernatorial election
Jan Meyers (1928–2019)	Republican	Kansas's 3rd	January 3, 1985	January 3, 1997	Retired
Catherine Small Long (1924–2019)	Democratic	Louisiana's 8th	March 30, 1985	January 3, 1987	Retired
Connie Morella (born 1931)	Republican	Maryland's 8th	January 3, 1987	January 3, 2003	Lost reelection
Liz J. Patterson (1939–2018)	Democratic	South Carolina's 4th	January 3, 1987	January 3, 1993	Lost reelection
Pat Saiki (1930–2026)	Republican	Hawaii's 1st	January 3, 1987	January 3, 1991	Retired to run unsuccessfully for the 1990 United States Senate special election in Hawaii
Louise Slaughter (1929–2018)	Democratic	New York's 30th, 28th, & 25th	January 3, 1987	March 16, 2018	Died in office
Nancy Pelosi (born 1940)	Democratic	California's 5th, 8th, 12th, & 11th	June 2, 1987	January 3, 2027	Retiring
Nita Lowey (1937–2025)	Democratic	New York's 20th, 18th, & 17th	January 3, 1989	January 3, 2021	Retired
Jolene Unsoeld (1931–2021)	Democratic	Washington's 3rd	January 3, 1989	January 3, 1995	Lost reelection
Jill Long Thompson (born 1952)	Democratic	Indiana's 4th	March 20, 1989	January 3, 1995	Lost reelection
Ileana Ros-Lehtinen (born 1952)	Republican	Florida's 18th & 27th	August 29, 1989	January 3, 2019	Retired
Susan Molinari (born 1958)	Republican	New York's 14th & 13th	March 20, 1990	August 2, 1997	Resigned to become co-host of CBS This Morning
Barbara-Rose Collins (1939–2021)	Democratic	Michigan's 13th & 15th	January 3, 1991	January 3, 1997	Lost renomination
Rosa DeLauro (born 1943)	Democratic	Connecticut's 3rd	January 3, 1991	present	
Eleanor Holmes Norton (born 1937)	Democratic	DC's at-large	January 3, 1991	January 3, 2027	Retiring
Joan Horn (born 1936)	Democratic	Missouri's 2nd	January 3, 1991	January 3, 1993	Lost reelection
Maxine Waters (born 1938)	Democratic	California's 29th, 35th, & 43rd	January 3, 1991	present	
Eva Clayton (born 1934)	Democratic	North Carolina's 1st	November 3, 1992	January 3, 2001	Retired

=== Between 1993 and 2002 ===
Name (lifespan)	Party	District	Start	End	Departure reason(s)
Corrine Brown (born 1946)	Democratic	Florida's 3rd & 5th	January 3, 1993	January 3, 2017	Lost renomination
Leslie Byrne (born 1946)	Democratic	Virginia's 11th	January 3, 1993	January 3, 1995	Lost reelection
Maria Cantwell (born 1958)	Democratic	Washington's 1st	January 3, 1993	January 3, 1995	Lost reelection
Pat Danner (born 1934)	Democratic	Missouri's 6th	January 3, 1993	January 3, 2001	Retired
Jennifer Dunn (1941–2007)	Republican	Washington's 8th	January 3, 1993	January 3, 2005	Retired
Karan English (born 1949)	Democratic	Arizona's 6th	January 3, 1993	January 3, 1995	Lost reelection
Anna Eshoo (born 1942)	Democratic	California's 14th, 18th, & 16th	January 3, 1993	January 3, 2025	Retired
Tillie Fowler (1942–2005)	Republican	Florida's 4th	January 3, 1993	January 3, 2001	Retired
Elizabeth Furse (1936–2021)	Democratic	Oregon's 1st	January 3, 1993	January 3, 1999	Retired
Jane Harman (born 1945)	Democratic	California's 36th	January 3, 1993	January 3, 1999	Retired to run unsuccessfully for the Democratic nomination for the 1998 California gubernatorial election
Jane Harman (born 1945)	Democratic	California's 36th	January 3, 2001	February 28, 2011	Resigned to become the Director, President, and Chief Executive Officer of the Woodrow Wilson International Center for Scholars
Eddie Johnson (1934–2023)	Democratic	Texas's 30th	January 3, 1993	January 3, 2023	Retired
Blanche Lincoln (born 1960)	Democratic	Arkansas's 1st	January 3, 1993	January 3, 1997	Retired
Carolyn Maloney (born 1946)	Democratic	New York's 14th & 12th	January 3, 1993	January 3, 2023	Lost renomination
Marjorie Margolies (born 1942)	Democratic	Pennsylvania's 13th	January 3, 1993	January 3, 1995	Lost reelection
Cynthia McKinney (born 1955)	Democratic	Georgia's 11th & 4th	January 3, 1993	January 3, 2003	Lost renomination
Cynthia McKinney (born 1955)	Democratic	Georgia's 4th	January 3, 2005	January 3, 2007	Lost renomination
Carrie Meek (1926–2021)	Democratic	Florida's 17th	January 3, 1993	January 3, 2003	Retired
Deborah Pryce (born 1951)	Republican	Ohio's 15th	January 3, 1993	January 3, 2009	Retired
Lucille Roybal-Allard (born 1941)	Democratic	California's 33rd, 34th, & 40th	January 3, 1993	January 3, 2023	Retired
Lynn Schenk (born 1945)	Democratic	California's 49th	January 3, 1993	January 3, 1995	Lost reelection
Karen Shepherd (born 1940)	Democratic	Utah's 2nd	January 3, 1993	January 3, 1995	Lost reelection
Karen Thurman (born 1951)	Democratic	Florida's 5th	January 3, 1993	January 3, 2003	Lost reelection
Nydia Velázquez (born 1953)	Democratic	New York's 12th & 7th	January 3, 1993	January 3, 2027	Retiring
Lynn Woolsey (born 1937)	Democratic	California's 6th	January 3, 1993	January 3, 2013	Retired
Helen Chenoweth (1938–2006)	Republican	Idaho's 1st	January 3, 1995	January 3, 2001	Retired
Barbara Cubin (born 1946)	Republican	Wyoming's at-large	January 3, 1995	January 3, 2009	Retired
Sheila Jackson Lee (1950-2024)	Democratic	Texas's 18th	January 3, 1995	July 19, 2024	Died in office
Sue Kelly (born 1936)	Republican	New York's 19th	January 3, 1995	January 3, 2007	Lost reelection
Zoe Lofgren (born 1947)	Democratic	California's 16th, 19th, & 18th	January 3, 1995	present	
Karen McCarthy (1947–2010)	Democratic	Missouri's 5th	January 3, 1995	January 3, 2005	Retired
Sue Myrick (born 1941)	Republican	North Carolina's 9th	January 3, 1995	January 3, 2013	Retired
Lynn N. Rivers (born 1956)	Democratic	Michigan's 13th	January 3, 1995	January 3, 2003	Lost renomination
Andrea Seastrand (born 1941)	Republican	California's 22nd	January 3, 1995	January 3, 1997	Lost reelection
Linda Smith (born 1950)	Republican	Washington's 3rd	January 3, 1995	January 3, 1999	Retired to run unsuccessfully for the 1998 United States Senate election in Washington
Enid Greene Waldholtz (born 1958)	Republican	Utah's 2nd	January 3, 1995	January 3, 1997	Retired
Juanita Millender-McDonald (1938–2007)	Democratic	California's 37th	March 26, 1996	April 22, 2007	Died in office
Jo Ann Emerson (born 1950)	Republican	Missouri's 8th	November 5, 1996	January 3, 1997	Switched affiliation and retook seat as an independent, having been reelected under that designation
Jo Ann Emerson (born 1950)	Independent	Missouri's 8th	January 3, 1997	January 8, 1997	Changed party back to Republican
Jo Ann Emerson (born 1950)	Republican	Missouri's 8th	January 8, 1997	January 22, 2013	Resigned to become the President and Chief Executive Officer of the National Rural Electric Cooperative Association
Julia Carson (1938–2007)	Democratic	Indiana's 10th & 7th	January 3, 1997	December 15, 2007	Died in office
Carolyn Cheeks Kilpatrick (1945–2025)	Democratic	Michigan's 15th & 13th	January 3, 1997	January 3, 2011	Lost renomination
Donna Christian-Christensen (born 1945)	Democratic	U.S. Virgin Island's at-large	January 3, 1997	January 3, 2015	Retired to run unsuccessfully for the 2014 United States Virgin Islands gubernatorial election
Diana DeGette (born 1957)	Democratic	Colorado's 1st	January 3, 1997	January 3, 2027	Lost renomination
Kay Granger (1943-2026)	Republican	Texas's 12th	January 3, 1997	January 3, 2025	Retired
Darlene Hooley (born 1939)	Democratic	Oregon's 5th	January 3, 1997	January 3, 2009	Retired
Carolyn McCarthy (1944–2025)	Democratic	New York's 4th	January 3, 1997	January 3, 2015	Retired
Anne Northup (born 1948)	Republican	Kentucky's 3rd	January 3, 1997	January 3, 2007	Lost reelection
Loretta Sánchez (born 1960)	Democratic	California's 46th, 47th, & 46th	January 3, 1997	January 3, 2017	Retired to run unsuccessfully for the 2016 United States Senate election in California
Debbie Stabenow (born 1950)	Democratic	Michigan's 8th	January 3, 1997	January 3, 2001	Retired to run successfully for the 2000 United States Senate election in Michigan
Ellen Tauscher (1951–2019)	Democratic	California's 10th	January 3, 1997	June 26, 2009	Resigned to become Under Secretary of State for Arms Control and International Security Affairs
Lois Capps (born 1938)	Democratic	California's 22nd, 23rd, & 24th	March 10, 1998	January 3, 2017	Retired
Mary Bono (born 1961)	Republican	California's 44th & 45th	April 7, 1998	January 3, 2013	Lost reelection
Barbara Lee (born 1946)	Democratic	California's 9th, 13th, & 12th	April 7, 1998	January 3, 2025	Retired to run unsuccessfully in the 2024 United States Senate elections in California
Heather Wilson (born 1960)	Republican	New Mexico's 1st	June 25, 1998	January 3, 2009	Retired to run unsuccessfully for the Republican nomination for the 2008 United States Senate election in New Mexico
Tammy Baldwin (born 1962)	Democratic	Wisconsin's 2nd	January 3, 1999	January 3, 2013	Retired to run successfully for the 2012 United States Senate election in Wisconsin, thus becoming the first openly LGBT person to serve in both houses of the United States Congress, and the first woman to represent Wisconsin in either.
Shelley Berkley (born 1951)	Democratic	Nevada's 1st	January 3, 1999	January 3, 2013	Retired to run unsuccessfully for the 2012 United States Senate election in Nevada
Judy Biggert (born 1937)	Republican	Illinois's 13th	January 3, 1999	January 3, 2013	Lost reelection
Grace Napolitano (born 1936)	Democratic	California's 34th, 38th, 32nd, & 31st	January 3, 1999	January 3, 2025	Retired
Jan Schakowsky (born 1944)	Democratic	Illinois's 9th	January 3, 1999	January 3, 2027	Retiring
Stephanie Tubbs Jones (1949–2008)	Democratic	Ohio's 11th	January 3, 1999	August 20, 2008	Died in office
Shelley Moore Capito (born 1953)	Republican	West Virginia's 2nd	January 3, 2001	January 3, 2015	Retired to run successfully for the 2014 United States Senate election in West Virginia
Jo Ann Davis (1950–2007)	Republican	Virginia's 1st	January 3, 2001	October 6, 2007	Died in office
Susan Davis (born 1944)	Democratic	California's 49th & 53rd	January 3, 2001	January 3, 2021	Retired
Melissa Hart (born 1962)	Republican	Pennsylvania's 4th	January 3, 2001	January 3, 2007	Lost reelection
Betty McCollum (born 1954)	Democratic (DFL)	Minnesota's 4th	January 3, 2001	present	
Hilda Solis (born 1957)	Democratic	California's 31st & 32nd	January 3, 2001	February 24, 2009	Resigned to become United States Secretary of Labor
Hilda Solis (born 1957)	Democratic	California's 38th	January 3, 2027	Elect	
Diane Watson (born 1933)	Democratic	California's 32nd & 33rd	June 5, 2001	January 3, 2011	Retired

=== Between 2003 and 2012 ===
Name (lifespan)	Party	District	Start	End	Departure reason(s)
Marsha Blackburn (born 1952)	Republican	Tennessee's 7th	January 3, 2003	January 3, 2019	Retired to run successfully for the 2018 United States Senate election in Tennessee
Madeleine Bordallo (born 1933)	Democratic	Guam's at-large	January 3, 2003	January 3, 2019	Lost renomination
Ginny Brown-Waite (born 1943)	Republican	Florida's 5th	January 3, 2003	January 3, 2011	Retired
Katherine Harris (born 1957)	Republican	Florida's 13th	January 3, 2003	January 3, 2007	Retired to run unsuccessfully for the 2006 United States Senate election in Florida
Denise Majette (born 1955)	Democratic	Georgia's 4th	January 3, 2003	January 3, 2005	Retired to run unsuccessfully for the 2004 United States Senate election in Georgia
Candice Miller (born 1954)	Republican	Michigan's 10th	January 3, 2003	January 3, 2017	Retired to run successfully for Public Works Commissioner of Macomb County
Marilyn Musgrave (born 1949)	Republican	Colorado's 4th	January 3, 2003	January 3, 2009	Lost reelection
Linda Sánchez (born 1969)	Democratic	California's 39th & 38th	January 3, 2003	present	
Stephanie Herseth Sandlin (born 1970)	Democratic	South Dakota's at-large	June 1, 2004	January 3, 2011	Lost reelection
Melissa Bean (born 1962)	Democratic	Illinois's 8th	January 3, 2005	January 3, 2011	Lost reelection
Melissa Bean (born 1962)	Democratic	Illinois's 8th	January 3, 2027	Elect	
Thelma Drake (born 1949)	Republican	Virginia's 2nd	January 3, 2005	January 3, 2009	Lost reelection
Virginia Foxx (born 1943)	Republican	North Carolina's 5th	January 3, 2005	January 3, 2027	Lost reelection
Cathy McMorris Rodgers (born 1969)	Republican	Washington's 5th	January 3, 2005	January 3, 2025	Retired
Gwen Moore (born 1951)	Democratic	Wisconsin's 4th	January 3, 2005	present	
Allyson Schwartz (born 1948)	Democratic	Pennsylvania's 13th	January 3, 2005	January 3, 2015	Retired to run unsuccessfully for the Democratic nomination for the 2014 Pennsylvania gubernatorial election
Debbie Wasserman Schultz (born 1966)	Democratic	Florida's 20th, 23rd, & 25th	January 3, 2005	present	
Doris Matsui (born 1944)	Democratic	California's 5th, 6th, & 7th	March 3, 2005	present	
Jean Schmidt (born 1951)	Republican	Ohio's 2nd	September 6, 2005	January 3, 2013	Lost renomination
Shelley Sekula-Gibbs (born 1953)	Republican	Texas's 22nd	November 13, 2006	January 3, 2007	Lost election to full term
Michele Bachmann (born 1956)	Republican	Minnesota's 6th	January 3, 2007	January 3, 2015	Retired
Nancy Boyda (born 1955)	Democratic	Kansas's 2nd	January 3, 2007	January 3, 2009	Lost reelection
Kathy Castor (born 1966)	Democratic	Florida's 11th & 14th	January 3, 2007	present	
Yvette Clarke (born 1964)	Democratic	New York's 11th & 9th	January 3, 2007	present	
Mary Fallin (born 1954)	Republican	Oklahoma's 5th	January 3, 2007	January 3, 2011	Retired to run successfully for the 2010 Oklahoma gubernatorial election
Gabrielle Giffords (born 1970)	Democratic	Arizona's 8th	January 3, 2007	January 25, 2012	Resigned due to the injuries from being shot in the head at close range during an assassination attempt during the 2011 Tucson shooting
Kirsten Gillibrand (born 1966)	Democratic	New York's 20th	January 3, 2007	January 25, 2009	Resigned after being appointed to the United States Senate
Mazie Hirono (born 1947)	Democratic	Hawaii's 2nd	January 3, 2007	January 3, 2013	Retired to run successfully for the 2012 United States Senate election in Hawaii
Carol Shea-Porter (born 1952)	Democratic	New Hampshire's 1st	January 3, 2007	January 3, 2011	Lost reelection
Carol Shea-Porter (born 1952)	Democratic	New Hampshire's 1st	January 3, 2013	January 3, 2015	Lost reelection
Carol Shea-Porter (born 1952)	Democratic	New Hampshire's 1st	January 3, 2017	January 3, 2019	Retired
Betty Sutton (born 1963)	Democratic	Ohio's 13th	January 3, 2007	January 3, 2013	Lost reelection
Laura Richardson (born 1962)	Democratic	California's 37th	August 21, 2007	January 3, 2013	Lost reelection
Niki Tsongas (born 1946)	Democratic	Massachusetts's 5th & 3rd	October 16, 2007	January 3, 2019	Retired
Jackie Speier (born 1950)	Democratic	California's 12th & 14th	April 8, 2008	January 3, 2023	Retired
Donna Edwards (born 1958)	Democratic	Maryland's 4th	June 17, 2008	January 3, 2017	Retired to run unsuccessfully for the Democratic nomination for the 2016 United States Senate election in Maryland
Marcia Fudge (born 1952)	Democratic	Ohio's 11th	November 18, 2008	March 10, 2021	Resigned to become United States Secretary of Housing and Urban Development
Kathy Dahlkemper (born 1957)	Democratic	Pennsylvania's 3rd	January 3, 2009	January 3, 2011	Lost reelection
Debbie Halvorson (born 1958)	Democratic	Illinois's 11th	January 3, 2009	January 3, 2011	Lost reelection
Lynn Jenkins (born 1963)	Republican	Kansas's 2nd	January 3, 2009	January 3, 2019	Retired
Mary Jo Kilroy (born 1949)	Democratic	Ohio's 15th	January 3, 2009	January 3, 2011	Lost reelection
Ann Kirkpatrick (born 1950)	Democratic	Arizona's 1st	January 3, 2009	January 3, 2011	Lost reelection
Ann Kirkpatrick (born 1950)	Democratic	Arizona's 1st	January 3, 2013	January 3, 2017	Retired to run unsuccessfully for the 2016 United States Senate election in Arizona
Ann Kirkpatrick (born 1950)	Democratic	Arizona's 2nd	January 3, 2019	January 3, 2023	Retired
Suzanne Kosmas (born 1944)	Democratic	Florida's 24th	January 3, 2009	January 3, 2011	Lost reelection
Cynthia Lummis (born 1954)	Republican	Wyoming's at-large	January 3, 2009	January 3, 2017	Retired
Betsy Markey (born 1956)	Democratic	Colorado's 4th	January 3, 2009	January 3, 2011	Lost reelection
Chellie Pingree (born 1955)	Democratic	Maine's 1st	January 3, 2009	present	
Dina Titus (born 1950)	Democratic	Nevada's 3rd	January 3, 2009	January 3, 2011	Lost reelection
Dina Titus (born 1950)	Democratic	Nevada's 1st	January 3, 2013	present	
Judy Chu (born 1953)	Democratic	California's 32nd, 27th, & 28th	June 19, 2009	present	
Sandy Adams (born 1956)	Republican	Florida's 24th	January 3, 2011	January 3, 2013	Lost renomination
Karen Bass (born 1953)	Democratic	California's 33rd & 37th	January 3, 2011	December 9, 2022	Resigned to become mayor of Los Angeles
Diane Black (born 1951)	Republican	Tennessee's 6th	January 3, 2011	January 3, 2019	Retired to run unsuccessfully for the Republican nomination for the 2018 Tennessee gubernatorial election
Ann Marie Buerkle (born 1951)	Republican	New York's 25th	January 3, 2011	January 3, 2013	Lost reelection
Renee Ellmers (born 1964)	Republican	North Carolina's 2nd	January 3, 2011	January 3, 2017	Lost renomination
Colleen Hanabusa (1951-2026)	Democratic	Hawaii's 1st	January 3, 2011	January 3, 2015	Retired to run unsuccessfully for the Democratic nomination for the 2014 United States Senate special election in Hawaii
Colleen Hanabusa (1951-2026)	Democratic	Hawaii's 1st	November 14, 2016	January 3, 2019	Retired to run unsuccessfully for the Democratic nomination for the 2018 Hawaii gubernatorial election
Vicky Hartzler (born 1960)	Republican	Missouri's 4th	January 3, 2011	January 3, 2023	Retired to run unsuccessfully for the 2022 United States Senate election in Missouri
Nan Hayworth (born 1959)	Republican	New York's 19th	January 3, 2011	January 3, 2013	Lost reelection
Jaime Herrera Beutler (born 1978)	Republican	Washington's 3rd	January 3, 2011	January 3, 2023	Lost renomination
Kristi Noem (born 1971)	Republican	South Dakota's at-large	January 3, 2011	January 3, 2019	Retired to run successfully for the 2018 South Dakota gubernatorial election
Martha Roby (born 1976)	Republican	Alabama's 2nd	January 3, 2011	January 3, 2021	Retired
Terri Sewell (born 1965)	Democratic	Alabama's 7th	January 3, 2011	present	
Frederica Wilson (born 1942)	Democratic	Florida's 17th & 24th	January 3, 2011	present	Retired
Kathy Hochul (born 1958)	Democratic	New York's 26th	June 1, 2011	January 3, 2013	Lost reelection
Janice Hahn (born 1952)	Democratic	California's 36th & 44th	July 12, 2011	December 4, 2016	Resigned to join the Los Angeles County Board of Supervisors
Suzanne Bonamici (born 1954)	Democratic	Oregon's 1st	January 21, 2012	present	
Suzan DelBene (born 1962)	Democratic	Washington's 1st	November 6, 2012	present	

=== Between 2013 and 2022 ===
Name (lifespan)	Party	District	Start	End	Departure reason(s)
Joyce Beatty (born 1950)	Democratic	Ohio's 3rd	January 3, 2013	present	
Susan Brooks (born 1960)	Republican	Indiana's 5th	January 3, 2013	January 3, 2021	Retired
Julia Brownley (born 1952)	Democratic	California's 26th	January 3, 2013	January 3, 2027	Retiring
Cheri Bustos (born 1961)	Democratic	Illinois's 17th	January 3, 2013	January 3, 2023	Retired
Tammy Duckworth (born 1968)	Democratic	Illinois's 8th	January 3, 2013	January 3, 2017	Retired to run successfully for the 2016 United States Senate election in Illinois
Elizabeth Esty (born 1959)	Democratic	Connecticut's 5th	January 3, 2013	January 3, 2019	Retired
Lois Frankel (born 1948)	Democratic	Florida's 22nd & 21st	January 3, 2013	present	
Tulsi Gabbard (born 1981)	Democratic	Hawaii's 2nd	January 3, 2013	January 3, 2021	Retired to run unsuccessfully in the Democratic primary for the 2020 United States presidential election
Michelle Lujan Grisham (born 1959)	Democratic	New Mexico's 1st	January 3, 2013	December 31, 2018	Resigned to become Governor of New Mexico
Annie Kuster (born 1956)	Democratic	New Hampshire's 2nd	January 3, 2013	January 3, 2025	Retired
Grace Meng (born 1975)	Democratic	New York's 6th	January 3, 2013	present	
Gloria Negrete McLeod (born 1941)	Democratic	California's 35th	January 3, 2013	January 3, 2015	Retired to run unsuccessfully for San Bernardino County Board of Supervisors
Kyrsten Sinema (born 1976)	Democratic	Arizona's 9th	January 3, 2013	January 3, 2019	Retired to run successfully for the 2018 United States Senate election in Arizona, thus becoming the first openly bisexual person to serve in both houses of the United States Congress.
Ann Wagner (born 1962)	Republican	Missouri's 2nd	January 3, 2013	January 3, 2027	Lost reelection
Jackie Walorski (1963-2022)	Republican	Indiana's 2nd	January 3, 2013	August 3, 2022	Died in office
Robin Kelly (born 1956)	Democratic	Illinois's 2nd	April 11, 2013	January 3, 2027	Retired to run unsuccessfully for the Democratic nomination for the 2026 United States Senate election in Illinois
Katherine Clark (born 1963)	Democratic	Massachusetts's 5th	December 10, 2013	present	
Alma Adams (born 1946)	Democratic	North Carolina's 12th	November 12, 2014	present	
Barbara Comstock (born 1959)	Republican	Virginia's 10th	January 3, 2015	January 3, 2019	Lost reelection
Debbie Dingell (born 1953)	Democratic	Michigan's 12th & 6th	January 3, 2015	present	
Gwen Graham (born 1963)	Democratic	Florida's 2nd	January 3, 2015	January 3, 2017	Retired
Brenda Lawrence (born 1954)	Democratic	Michigan's 14th	January 3, 2015	January 3, 2023	Retired
Mia Love (1975–2025)	Republican	Utah's 4th	January 3, 2015	January 3, 2019	Lost reelection
Martha McSally (born 1966)	Republican	Arizona's 2nd	January 3, 2015	January 3, 2019	Retired to run unsuccessfully for the 2018 United States Senate election in Arizona
Stacey Plaskett (born 1966)	Democratic	U.S. Virgin Island's at-large	January 3, 2015	January 3, 2027	Retired to run successfully for the 2026 United States Virgin Islands gubernatorial election
Amata Radewagen (born 1947) (Note: Daughter of Peter Tali Coleman)	Republican	American Samoa's at-large	January 3, 2015	present	
Kathleen Rice (born 1965)	Democratic	New York's 4th	January 3, 2015	January 3, 2023	Retired
Elise Stefanik (born 1984) (Note: Formerly the youngest woman elected to Congress (at age 30))	Republican	New York's 21st	January 3, 2015	January 3, 2027	Retiring
Norma Torres (born 1965)	Democratic	California's 35th	January 3, 2015	present	
Mimi Walters (born 1962)	Republican	California's 45th	January 3, 2015	January 3, 2019	Lost reelection
Bonnie Watson Coleman (born 1945)	Democratic	New Jersey's 12th	January 3, 2015	January 3, 2027	Retiring
Nanette Barragán (born 1976)	Democratic	California's 44th	January 3, 2017	present	
Lisa Blunt Rochester (born 1962)	Democratic	Delaware's at-large	January 3, 2017	January 3, 2025	Retired to run successfully for the 2024 United States Senate election in Delaware
Liz Cheney (born 1966)	Republican	Wyoming's at-large	January 3, 2017	January 3, 2023	Lost renomination
Val Demings (born 1957)	Democratic	Florida's 10th	January 3, 2017	January 3, 2023	Retired to run unsuccessfully for the 2022 United States Senate election in Florida
Jenniffer González-Colón (born 1976)	Republican	Puerto Rico's at-large	January 3, 2017	January 1, 2025	Retired to run successfully for governor of Puerto Rico
Pramila Jayapal (born 1965)	Democratic	Washington's 7th	January 3, 2017	present	
Stephanie Murphy (born 1978)	Democratic	Florida's 7th	January 3, 2017	January 3, 2023	Retired
Jacky Rosen (born 1957)	Democratic	Nevada's 3rd	January 3, 2017	January 3, 2019	Retired to run successfully for the 2018 United States Senate election in Nevada, the first one-term female House member to immediately do so.
Claudia Tenney (born 1961)	Republican	New York's 22nd & 24th	January 3, 2017	January 3, 2019	Lost reelection
Claudia Tenney (born 1961)	Republican	New York's 22nd & 24th	February 11, 2021 (Note: Tenney won the November 2020 House election in New York's 22nd congressional district, but certification was delayed due to the closeness of the race and vote-counting issues. She was certified as the winner on February 8, 2021, before being seated in the 117th Congress three days later.)	present	
Karen Handel (born 1962)	Republican	Georgia's 6th	June 26, 2017	January 3, 2019	Lost reelection
Debbie Lesko (born 1958)	Republican	Arizona's 8th	May 7, 2018	January 3, 2025	Retired to run successfully for the Maricopa County Board of Supervisors
Mary Gay Scanlon (born 1959)	Democratic	Pennsylvania's 7th & 5th	November 13, 2018	present	
Susan Wild (born 1957)	Democratic	Pennsylvania's 15th & 7th	November 27, 2018	January 3, 2025	Lost reelection
Brenda Jones (born 1959)	Democratic	Michigan's 13th	November 29, 2018	January 3, 2019	Lost nomination for a full term
Cindy Axne (born 1965) (Note: Tallest-statured woman in Congress, at 6 feet (1.83 m))	Democratic	Iowa's 3rd	January 3, 2019	January 3, 2023	Lost reelection
Angie Craig (born 1972)	Democratic (DFL)	Minnesota's 2nd	January 3, 2019	January 3, 2027	Retired to run unsuccessfully for the DFL nomination for the 2026 United States Senate election in Minnesota
Sharice Davids (born 1980)	Democratic	Kansas's 3rd	January 3, 2019	present	
Madeleine Dean (born 1959)	Democratic	Pennsylvania's 4th	January 3, 2019	present	
Veronica Escobar (born 1969)	Democratic	Texas's 16th	January 3, 2019	present	
Abby Finkenauer (born 1988)	Democratic	Iowa's 1st	January 3, 2019	January 3, 2021	Lost reelection
Lizzie Fletcher (born 1975)	Democratic	Texas's 7th	January 3, 2019	present	
Sylvia Garcia (born 1950)	Democratic	Texas's 29th	January 3, 2019	present	
Deb Haaland (born 1960)	Democratic	New Mexico's 1st	January 3, 2019	March 16, 2021	Resigned to become United States Secretary of the Interior
Jahana Hayes (born 1973)	Democratic	Connecticut's 5th	January 3, 2019	present	
Katie Hill (born 1987)	Democratic	California's 25th	January 3, 2019	November 3, 2019	Resigned amid allegations of inappropriate sexual relationships
Kendra Horn (born 1976)	Democratic	Oklahoma's 5th	January 3, 2019	January 3, 2021	Lost reelection
Chrissy Houlahan (born 1968)	Democratic	Pennsylvania's 6th	January 3, 2019	present	
Susie Lee (born 1966)	Democratic	Nevada's 3rd	January 3, 2019	present	
Elaine Luria (born 1975)	Democratic	Virginia's 2nd	January 3, 2019	January 3, 2023	Lost reelection
Elaine Luria (born 1975)	Democratic	Virginia's 2nd	January 3, 2027	Elect	
Lucy McBath (born 1960)	Democratic	Georgia's 6th & 7th	January 3, 2019	present	
Carol Miller (born 1950)	Republican	West Virginia's 3rd & 1st	January 3, 2019	present	
Debbie Mucarsel-Powell (born 1971)	Democratic	Florida's 26th	January 3, 2019	January 3, 2021	Lost reelection
Alexandria Ocasio-Cortez (born 1989) (Note: Youngest woman elected to Congress (at age 29))	Democratic	New York's 14th	January 3, 2019	present	
Ilhan Omar (born 1981)	Democratic (DFL)	Minnesota's 5th	January 3, 2019	present	
Katie Porter (born 1974)	Democratic	California's 45th & 47th	January 3, 2019	January 3, 2025	Retired to run unsuccessfully for the Democratic nomination for the 2024 United States Senate elections in California
Ayanna Pressley (born 1974)	Democratic	Massachusetts's 7th	January 3, 2019	present	
Kim Schrier (born 1968)	Democratic	Washington's 8th	January 3, 2019	present	
Donna Shalala (born 1941) (Note: Oldest woman elected to Congress (at age 77))	Democratic	Florida's 27th	January 3, 2019	January 3, 2021	Lost reelection
Mikie Sherrill (born 1972)	Democratic	New Jersey's 11th	January 3, 2019	November 20, 2025	Resigned to become Governor of New Jersey
Elissa Slotkin (born 1976)	Democratic	Michigan's 8th & 7th	January 3, 2019	January 3, 2025	Retired to run successfully for the 2024 United States Senate election in Michigan
Abigail Spanberger (born 1979)	Democratic	Virginia's 7th	January 3, 2019	January 3, 2025	Retired to run successfully for governor of Virginia in 2025
Haley Stevens (born 1983)	Democratic	Michigan's 11th	January 3, 2019	January 3, 2027	Retired to run unsuccessfully for the Democratic nomination for the 2026 United States Senate election in Michigan
Rashida Tlaib (born 1976)	Democratic	Michigan's 13th & 12th	January 3, 2019	present	
Xochitl Torres Small (born 1984)	Democratic	New Mexico's 2nd	January 3, 2019	January 3, 2021	Lost reelection
Lori Trahan (born 1973)	Democratic	Massachusetts's 3rd	January 3, 2019	present	
Lauren Underwood (born 1986)	Democratic	Illinois's 14th	January 3, 2019	present	
Jennifer Wexton (born 1968)	Democratic	Virginia's 10th	January 3, 2019	January 3, 2025	Retired
Stephanie Bice (born 1973)	Republican	Oklahoma's 5th	January 3, 2021	present	
Lauren Boebert (born 1986)	Republican	Colorado's 3rd	January 3, 2021	January 3, 2025	Reelected in a different district
Lauren Boebert (born 1986)	Republican	Colorado's 4th	January 3, 2025	January 3, 2027	Lost reelection
Carolyn Bourdeaux (born 1970)	Democratic	Georgia's 7th	January 3, 2021	January 3, 2023	Lost renomination
Cori Bush (born 1974)	Democratic	Missouri's 1st	January 3, 2021	January 3, 2025	Lost renomination
Kat Cammack (born 1988)	Republican	Florida's 3rd	January 3, 2021	present	
Michelle Fischbach (born 1965)	Republican	Minnesota's 7th	January 3, 2021	present	
Marjorie Taylor Greene (born 1974)	Republican	Georgia's 14th	January 3, 2021	January 5, 2026	Resigned
Diana Harshbarger (born 1960)	Republican	Tennessee's 1st	January 3, 2021	present	
Yvette Herrell (born 1964)	Republican	New Mexico's 2nd	January 3, 2021	January 3, 2023	Lost reelection
Ashley Hinson (born 1983)	Republican	Iowa's 1st & 2nd	January 3, 2021	January 3, 2027	Retired to run unsuccessfully for the 2026 United States Senate election in Iowa
Sara Jacobs (born 1989)	Democratic	California's 53rd & 51st	January 3, 2021	present	
Young Kim (born 1962)	Republican	California's 39th & 40th	January 3, 2021	January 3, 2027	Lost reelection
Teresa Leger Fernandez (born 1959)	Democratic	New Mexico's 3rd	January 3, 2021	present	
Nancy Mace (born 1977)	Republican	South Carolina's 1st	January 3, 2021	January 3, 2027	Retired to run unsuccessfully for the Republican nomination for the 2026 South Carolina gubernatorial election
Nicole Malliotakis (born 1980)	Republican	New York's 11th	January 3, 2021	present	
Kathy Manning (born 1956)	Democratic	North Carolina's 6th	January 3, 2021	January 3, 2025	Retired
Lisa McClain (born 1966)	Republican	Michigan's 10th & 9th	January 3, 2021	present	
Mary Miller (born 1959)	Republican	Illinois's 15th	January 3, 2021	present	
Mariannette Miller-Meeks (born 1955)	Republican	Iowa's 2nd & 1st	January 3, 2021	January 3, 2027	Lost reelection
Marie Newman (born 1964)	Democratic	Illinois's 3rd	January 3, 2021	January 3, 2023	Lost renomination
Deborah Ross (born 1963)	Democratic	North Carolina's 2nd	January 3, 2021	present	
María Elvira Salazar (born 1961)	Republican	Florida's 27th	January 3, 2021	present	
Victoria Spartz (born 1978)	Republican	Indiana's 5th	January 3, 2021	January 3, 2027	Lost reelection
Michelle Steel (born 1955)	Republican	California's 48th & 45th	January 3, 2021	January 3, 2025	Lost reelection
Marilyn Strickland (born 1962)	Democratic	Washington's 10th	January 3, 2021	present	
Beth Van Duyne (born 1970)	Republican	Texas's 24th	January 3, 2021	present	
Nikema Williams (born 1978)	Democratic	Georgia's 5th	January 3, 2021	present	
Julia Letlow (born 1981)	Republican	Louisiana's 5th	April 14, 2021	January 3, 2027	Retired to run successfully for the 2026 United States Senate election in Louisiana
Melanie Stansbury (born 1979)	Democratic	New Mexico's 1st	June 14, 2021	present	
Shontel Brown (born 1975)	Democratic	Ohio's 11th	November 4, 2021	present	
Sheila Cherfilus-McCormick (born 1979)	Democratic	Florida's 20th	January 18, 2022	April 21, 2026	Resigned
Connie Conway (born 1950)	Republican	California's 22nd	June 14, 2022	January 3, 2023	Retired
Mayra Flores (born 1986)	Republican	Texas's 34th	June 21, 2022	January 3, 2023	Lost reelection
Mary Peltola (born 1975)	Democratic	Alaska's at-large	September 13, 2022	January 3, 2025	Lost reelection

=== Between 2023 and present ===
Name (lifespan)	Party	District	Start	End	Departure reason(s)
Becca Balint (born 1968)	Democratic	Vermont's at-large	January 3, 2023	present	
Nikki Budzinski (born 1977)	Democratic	Illinois's 13th	January 3, 2023	present	
Yadira Caraveo (born 1980)	Democratic	Colorado's 8th	January 3, 2023	January 3, 2025	Lost reelection
Lori Chavez-DeRemer (born 1968)	Republican	Oregon's 5th	January 3, 2023	January 3, 2025	Lost reelection
Jasmine Crockett (born 1981)	Democratic	Texas's 30th	January 3, 2023	January 3, 2027	Retired to run unsuccessfully for the Democratic nomination for the 2026 United States Senate election in Texas
Monica De La Cruz (born 1974)	Republican	Texas's 15th	January 3, 2023	January 3, 2027	Lost reelection
Valerie Foushee (born 1956)	Democratic	North Carolina's 4th	January 3, 2023	present	
Marie Gluesenkamp Perez (born 1988)	Democratic	Washington's 3rd	January 3, 2023	present	
Harriet Hageman (born 1962)	Republican	Wyoming's at-large	January 3, 2023	January 3, 2027	Retired to run successfully for the 2026 United States Senate election in Wyoming
Erin Houchin (born 1976)	Republican	Indiana's 9th	January 3, 2023	present	
Val Hoyle (born 1964)	Democratic	Oregon's 4th	January 3, 2023	present	
Sydney Kamlager-Dove (born 1972)	Democratic	California's 37th	January 3, 2023	present	
Jen Kiggans (born 1971)	Republican	Virginia's 2nd	January 3, 2023	January 3, 2027	Lost reelection
Laurel Lee (born 1974)	Republican	Florida's 15th	January 3, 2023	present	
Summer Lee (born 1987)	Democratic	Pennsylvania's 12th	January 3, 2023	present	
Anna Paulina Luna (born 1989)	Republican	Florida's 13th	January 3, 2023	present	
Brittany Pettersen (born 1981)	Democratic	Colorado's 7th	January 3, 2023	present	
Delia Ramirez (born 1983)	Democratic	Illinois's 3rd	January 3, 2023	present	
Andrea Salinas (born 1969)	Democratic	Oregon's 6th	January 3, 2023	present	
Hillary Scholten (born 1982)	Democratic	Michigan's 3rd	January 3, 2023	present	
Emilia Sykes (born 1986)	Democratic	Ohio's 13th	January 3, 2023	present	
Jill Tokuda (born 1976)	Democratic	Hawaii's 2nd	January 3, 2023	present	
Jennifer McClellan (born 1972)	Democratic	Virginia's 4th	March 7, 2023	present	
Celeste Maloy (born 1981)	Republican	Utah's 2nd	November 28, 2023	present	
LaMonica McIver (born 1986)	Democratic	New Jersey's 10th	September 23, 2024	present	
Erica Lee Carter (born 1980)	Democratic	Texas's 18th	November 12, 2024	January 3, 2025	Retired
Yassamin Ansari (born 1992)	Democratic	Arizona's 3rd	January 3, 2025	present	
Sheri Biggs (born 1970)	Republican	South Carolina's 3rd	January 3, 2025	present	
Janelle Bynum (born 1975)	Democratic	Oregon's 5th	January 3, 2025	present	
Maxine Dexter (born 1972)	Democratic	Oregon's 3rd	January 3, 2025	present	
Sarah Elfreth (born 1988)	Democratic	Maryland's 3rd	January 3, 2025	present	
Julie Fedorchak (born 1968)	Republican	North Dakota's at-large	January 3, 2025	present	
Laura Friedman (born 1966)	Democratic	California's 30th	January 3, 2025	present	
Laura Gillen (born 1969)	Democratic	New York's 4th	January 3, 2025	present	
Maggie Goodlander (born 1986)	Democratic	New Hampshire's 2nd	January 3, 2025	present	
Julie Johnson (born 1966)	Democratic	Texas's 32nd	January 3, 2025	January 3, 2027	Lost renomination
Kimberlyn King-Hinds (born 1975)	Republican	Northern Mariana Islands' at-large	January 3, 2025	present	
Sarah McBride (born 1990)	Democratic	Delaware's at-large	January 3, 2025	present	
April McClain Delaney (born 1964)	Democratic	Maryland's 6th	January 3, 2025	present	
Kristen McDonald Rivet (born 1970)	Democratic	Michigan's 8th	January 3, 2025	present	
Kelly Morrison (born 1969)	Democratic (DFL)	Minnesota's 3rd	January 3, 2025	present	
Nellie Pou (born 1956)	Democratic	New Jersey's 9th	January 3, 2025	present	
Emily Randall (born 1985)	Democratic	Washington's 6th	January 3, 2025	present	
Luz Rivas (born 1974)	Democratic	California's 29th	January 3, 2025	present	
Lateefah Simon (born 1977)	Democratic	California's 12th	January 3, 2025	present	
Adelita Grijalva (born 1970)	Democratic	Arizona's 7th	November 12, 2025	present	
Analilia Mejia (born 1977)	Democratic	New Jersey's 11th	April 20, 2026	present	
Aisha Wahab (born 1987)	Democratic	California's 14th	September 2, 2026	present	

=== Members-elect ===
Note: Returning members-elect Melissa Bean, Elaine Luria, and Hilda Solis are listed above with their prior terms.

Name (lifespan)	Party	District	Start	End
Darializa Avila Chevalier (born 1993/1994)	Democratic	New York's 13th	January 3, 2027	Elect
Teresa Benitez-Thompson (born 1978)	Democratic	Nevada's 2nd	January 3, 2027	Elect
Rebecca Bennett (born 1987)	Democratic	New Jersey's 7th	January 3, 2027	Elect
Christina Bohannan (born 1971)	Democratic	Iowa's 1st	January 3, 2027	Elect
Victoria Broderick (born 1991/1992)	Democratic	Tennessee's 4th	January 3, 2027	Elect
Jasmine Clark (born 1982)	Democratic	Georgia's 13th	January 3, 2027	Elect
Paige Cognetti (born 1980)	Democratic	Pennsylvania's 8th	January 3, 2027	Elect
Cait Conley (born 1985/1986)	Democratic	New York's 17th	January 3, 2027	Elect
Rebecca Cooke (born 1987)	Democratic	Wisconsin's 3rd	January 3, 2027	Elect
Pia Dandiya (born 1986/87)	Democratic	Florida's 22nd	January 3, 2027	Elect
Patty García (born 1984/1985)	Democratic	Illinois's 4th	January 3, 2027	Elect
Angela Gonzales-Torres (born 1994)	Democratic	California's 34th	January 3, 2027	Elect
Sydney Gruters (born 1981/1982)	Republican	Florida's 16th	January 3, 2027	Elect
Leticia Gutierrez (born 1972/1973)	Democratic	Texas's 9th	January 3, 2027	Elect
Christina Hines (born 1989)	Democratic	Michigan's 10th	January 3, 2027	Elect
Jacqui Irwin (born 1962)	Democratic	California's 26th	January 3, 2027	Elect
Lindsay James (born 1980)	Democratic	Iowa's 2nd	January 3, 2027	Elect
Jessica Killin (born 1972/1973)	Democratic	Colorado's 5th	January 3, 2027	Elect
Melat Kiros (born 1997)	Democratic	Colorado's 1st	January 3, 2027	Elect
Kristina Knickerbocker (born 1990/1991)	Democratic	Ohio's 10th	January 3, 2027	Elect
Nancy Lacore (born 1968/1969)	Democratic	South Carolina's 1st	January 3, 2027	Elect
Eileen Laubacher (born 1968/1969)	Democratic	Colorado's 4th	January 3, 2027	Elect
Alicia Limtiaco (born 1963)	Democratic	Guam's at-large	January 3, 2027	Elect
Amanda McKinney (born 1978)	Republican	Washington's 4th	January 3, 2027	Elect
JoAnna Mendoza (born 1975/1976)	Democratic	Arizona's 6th	January 3, 2027	Elect
Donna Miller (born 1965)	Democratic	Illinois's 2nd	January 3, 2027	Elect
Katy Padilla Stout (born 1985)	Democratic	Texas's 23rd	January 3, 2027	Elect
Denise Powell (born 1978)	Democratic	Nebraska's 2nd	January 3, 2027	Elect
Janelle Sarauw (born 1985)	Democratic	U.S. Virgin Islands' at-large	January 3, 2027	Elect
Stefany Shaheen (born 1974)	Democratic	New Hampshire's 2nd	January 3, 2027	Elect
Jessica Steinmann (born 1984)	Republican	Texas's 8th	January 3, 2027	Elect
Janelle Stelson (born 1960)	Democratic	Pennsylvania's 10th	January 3, 2027	Elect
Shannon Taylor (born 1967)	Democratic	Virginia's 1st	January 3, 2027	Elect
Sarah Trone Garriott (born 1978)	Democratic	Iowa's 3rd	January 3, 2027	Elect
Claire Valdez (born 1989)	Democratic	New York's 7th	January 3, 2027	Elect
Marni von Wilpert (born 1982)	Democratic	California's 48th	January 3, 2027	Elect
LaKesha Womack (born 1976/1977)	Democratic	North Carolina's 14th	January 3, 2027	Elect

== Current female members ==
Image	Name (lifespan)	Party	District	Term start	Expected departure
Rep. Kaptur	Marcy Kaptur (born 1946)	Democratic	Ohio's 9th	January 3, 1983	
Rep. Pelosi	Nancy Pelosi (born 1940)	Democratic	California's 11th	June 2, 1987	January 3, 2027; Retiring
Rep. DeLauro	Rosa DeLauro (born 1943)	Democratic	Connecticut's 3rd	January 3, 1991	
Del. Holmes Norton	Eleanor Holmes Norton (born 1937)	Democratic	DC's at-large	January 3, 1991	January 3, 2027; Retiring
Rep. Waters	Maxine Waters (born 1938)	Democratic	California's 43rd	January 3, 1991	
Rep. Velázquez	Nydia Velázquez (born 1953)	Democratic	New York's 7th	January 3, 1993	January 3, 2027; Retiring
Rep. Lofgren	Zoe Lofgren (born 1947)	Democratic	California's 18th	January 3, 1995	
Rep. DeGette	Diana DeGette (born 1957)	Democratic	Colorado's 1st	January 3, 1997	January 3, 2027; Lost renomination
Rep. Schakowsky	Jan Schakowsky (born 1944)	Democratic	Illinois's 9th	January 3, 1999	January 3, 2027; Retiring
Rep. McCollum	Betty McCollum (born 1954)	Democratic (DFL)	Minnesota's 4th	January 3, 2001	
Rep. Sánchez	Linda Sánchez (born 1969)	Democratic	California's 38th	January 3, 2003	
Rep. Foxx	Virginia Foxx (born 1943)	Republican	North Carolina's 5th	January 3, 2005	January 3, 2027; Lost reelection
Rep. Moore	Gwen Moore (born 1951)	Democratic	Wisconsin's 4th	January 3, 2005	
Rep. Wasserman-Schultz	Debbie Wasserman Schultz (born 1966)	Democratic	Florida's 25th	January 3, 2005	
Rep. Matsui	Doris Matsui (born 1944)	Democratic	California's 7th	March 3, 2005	
Rep. Castor	Kathy Castor (born 1966)	Democratic	Florida's 14th	January 3, 2007	
Rep. Clarke	Yvette Clarke (born 1964)	Democratic	New York's 9th	January 3, 2007	
Rep. Pingree	Chellie Pingree (born 1955)	Democratic	Maine's 1st	January 3, 2009	
Rep. Chu	Judy Chu (born 1953)	Democratic	California's 28th	June 19, 2009	
Rep. Sewell	Terri Sewell (born 1965)	Democratic	Alabama's 7th	January 3, 2011	
Rep. Wilson	Frederica Wilson (born 1942)	Democratic	Florida's 24th	January 3, 2011	January 3, 2027; Retiring
Rep. Bonamici	Suzanne Bonamici (born 1954)	Democratic	Oregon's 1st	January 21, 2012	
Rep. DelBene	Suzan DelBene (born 1962)	Democratic	Washington's 1st	November 6, 2012	
Rep. Beatty	Joyce Beatty (born 1950)	Democratic	Ohio's 3rd	January 3, 2013	
Rep. Brownley	Julia Brownley (born 1952)	Democratic	California's 26th	January 3, 2013	January 3, 2027; Retiring
Rep. Frankel	Lois Frankel (born 1948)	Democratic	Florida's 22nd	January 3, 2013	
Rep. Meng	Grace Meng (born 1975)	Democratic	New York's 6th	January 3, 2013	
Rep. Titus	Dina Titus (born 1950)	Democratic	Nevada's 1st	January 3, 2013	
Rep. Wagner	Ann Wagner (born 1962)	Republican	Missouri's 2nd	January 3, 2013	January 3, 2027; Lost reelection
Rep. Kelly	Robin Kelly (born 1956)	Democratic	Illinois's 2nd	April 11, 2013	January 3, 2027; Retiring
Rep. Clark	Katherine Clark (born 1963)	Democratic	Massachusetts's 5th	December 10, 2013	
Rep. Adams	Alma Adams (born 1946)	Democratic	North Carolina's 12th	November 12, 2014	
Rep. Dingell	Debbie Dingell (born 1953)	Democratic	Michigan's 6th		
Del. Plaskett	Stacey Plaskett (born 1966)	Democratic	U.S. Virgin Island's at-large	January 3, 2027; Retiring	
Del. Radewagen	Amata Radewagen (born 1947)	Republican	American Samoa's at-large		
Rep. Stefanik	Elise Stefanik (born 1984)	Republican	New York's 21st	January 3, 2027; Retiring	
Rep. Torres	Norma Torres (born 1965)	Democratic	California's 35th		
Rep. Watson Coleman	Bonnie Watson Coleman (born 1945)	Democratic	New Jersey's 12th	January 3, 2027; Retiring	
Rep. Barragán	Nanette Barragán (born 1976)	Democratic	California's 44th	January 3, 2017	
Rep. Jayapal	Pramila Jayapal (born 1965)	Democratic	Washington's 7th	January 3, 2017	
Rep. Scanlon	Mary Gay Scanlon (born 1959)	Democratic	Pennsylvania's 5th	November 27, 2018	
Rep. Craig	Angie Craig (born 1972)	Democratic (DFL)	Minnesota's 2nd	January 3, 2019	January 3, 2027; Retiring
Rep. Davids	Sharice Davids (born 1980)	Democratic	Kansas's 3rd	January 3, 2019	
Rep. Dean	Madeleine Dean (born 1959)	Democratic	Pennsylvania's 4th	January 3, 2019	
Rep. Escobar	Veronica Escobar (born 1969)	Democratic	Texas's 16th	January 3, 2019	
Rep. Fletcher	Lizzie Fletcher (born 1975)	Democratic	Texas's 7th	January 3, 2019	
Rep. Garcia	Sylvia Garcia (born 1950)	Democratic	Texas's 29th	January 3, 2019	
Rep. Hayes	Jahana Hayes (born 1973)	Democratic	Connecticut's 5th	January 3, 2019	
Rep. Houlahan	Chrissy Houlahan (born 1968)	Democratic	Pennsylvania's 6th	January 3, 2019	
Rep. Lee	Susie Lee (born 1966)	Democratic	Nevada's 3rd	January 3, 2019	
Rep. McBath	Lucy McBath (born 1960)	Democratic	Georgia's 7th	January 3, 2019	
Rep. C. Miller	Carol Miller (born 1950)	Republican	West Virginia's 1st	January 3, 2019	
Rep. Ocasio-Cortez	Alexandria Ocasio-Cortez (born 1989)	Democratic	New York's 14th	January 3, 2019	
Rep. Omar	Ilhan Omar (born 1981)	Democratic (DFL)	Minnesota's 5th	January 3, 2019	
Rep. Presley	Ayanna Pressley (born 1974)	Democratic	Massachusetts's 7th	January 3, 2019	
Rep. Schrier	Kim Schrier (born 1968)	Democratic	Washington's 8th	January 3, 2019	
Rep. Stevens	Haley Stevens (born 1983)	Democratic	Michigan's 11th	January 3, 2019	January 3, 2027; Retiring
Rep. Tlaib	Rashida Tlaib (born 1976)	Democratic	Michigan's 12th	January 3, 2019	
Rep. Trahan	Lori Trahan (born 1973)	Democratic	Massachusetts's 3rd	January 3, 2019	
Rep. Underwood	Lauren Underwood (born 1986)	Democratic	Illinois's 14th	January 3, 2019	
Rep. Bice	Stephanie Bice (born 1973)	Republican	Oklahoma's 5th	January 3, 2021	
Rep. Boebert	Lauren Boebert (born 1986)	Republican	Colorado's 4th	January 3, 2021	January 3, 2027; Lost reelection
Rep. Cammack	Kat Cammack (born 1988)	Republican	Florida's 3rd	January 3, 2021	
Rep. Fischbach	Michelle Fischbach (born 1965)	Republican	Minnesota's 7th	January 3, 2021	
Rep. Harshbarger	Diana Harshbarger (born 1960)	Republican	Tennessee's 1st	January 3, 2021	
Rep. Hinson	Ashley Hinson (born 1983)	Republican	Iowa's 2nd	January 3, 2021	January 3, 2027; Retiring
Rep. Jacobs	Sara Jacobs (born 1989)	Democratic	California's 51st	January 3, 2021	
Rep. Kim	Young Kim (born 1962)	Republican	California's 40th	January 3, 2021	January 3, 2027; Lost reelection
Rep. Leger Fernandez	Teresa Leger Fernandez (born 1959)	Democratic	New Mexico's 3rd	January 3, 2021	
Rep. Mace	Nancy Mace (born 1977)	Republican	South Carolina's 1st	January 3, 2021	January 3, 2027; Retiring
Rep. Malliotakis	Nicole Malliotakis (born 1980)	Republican	New York's 11th	January 3, 2021	
Rep. McClain	Lisa McClain (born 1966)	Republican	Michigan's 9th	January 3, 2021	
Rep. M. Miller	Mary Miller (born 1959)	Republican	Illinois's 15th	January 3, 2021	
Rep. Miller-Meeks	Mariannette Miller-Meeks (born 1955)	Republican	Iowa's 1st	January 3, 2021	January 3, 2027; Lost reelection
Rep. Ross	Deborah Ross (born 1963)	Democratic	North Carolina's 2nd	January 3, 2021	
Rep. Salazar	María Elvira Salazar (born 1961)	Republican	Florida's 27th	January 3, 2021	
Rep. Spartz	Victoria Spartz (born 1978)	Republican	Indiana's 5th	January 3, 2021	January 3, 2027; Lost reelection
Rep. Strickland	Marilyn Strickland (born 1962)	Democratic	Washington's 10th	January 3, 2021	
Rep. Van Duyne	Beth Van Duyne (born 1970)	Republican	Texas's 24th	January 3, 2021	
Rep. Williams	Nikema Williams (born 1978)	Democratic	Georgia's 5th	January 3, 2021	
Rep. Tenney	Claudia Tenney (born 1961)	Republican	New York's 24th	February 11, 2021	
Rep. Letlow	Julia Letlow (born 1981)	Republican	Louisiana's 5th	April 14, 2021	January 3, 2027; Retiring
Rep. Stansbury	Melanie Stansbury (born 1979)	Democratic	New Mexico's 1st	June 14, 2021	
Rep. Brown	Shontel Brown (born 1975)	Democratic	Ohio's 11th	November 4, 2021	
Rep. Balint	Becca Balint (born 1968)	Democratic	Vermont's at-large	January 3, 2023	
Rep. Budzinski	Nikki Budzinski (born 1977)	Democratic	Illinois's 13th	January 3, 2023	
Rep. Crockett	Jasmine Crockett (born 1981)	Democratic	Texas's 30th	January 3, 2023	January 3, 2027; Retiring
Rep. De La Cruz	Monica De La Cruz (born 1974)	Republican	Texas's 15th	January 3, 2023	January 3, 2027; Lost reelection
Rep. Foushee	Valerie Foushee (born 1956)	Democratic	North Carolina's 4th	January 3, 2023	
Rep. Gluesenkamp Perez	Marie Gluesenkamp Perez (born 1988)	Democratic	Washington's 3rd	January 3, 2023	
Rep. Hageman	Harriet Hageman (born 1962)	Republican	Wyoming's at-large	January 3, 2023	January 3, 2027; Retiring
Rep. Houchin	Erin Houchin (born 1976)	Republican	Indiana's 9th	January 3, 2023	
Rep. Hoyle	Val Hoyle (born 1964)	Democratic	Oregon's 4th	January 3, 2023	
Rep. Kamlager-Dove	Sydney Kamlager-Dove (born 1972)	Democratic	California's 37th	January 3, 2023	
Rep. Kiggans	Jen Kiggans (born 1971)	Republican	Virginia's 2nd	January 3, 2023	January 3, 2027; Lost reelection
Rep. L. Lee	Laurel Lee (born 1974)	Republican	Florida's 15th	January 3, 2023	
Rep. S. Lee	Summer Lee (born 1987)	Democratic	Pennsylvania's 12th	January 3, 2023	
Rep. Luna	Anna Paulina Luna (born 1989)	Republican	Florida's 13th	January 3, 2023	
Rep. Pettersen	Brittany Pettersen (born 1981)	Democratic	Colorado's 7th	January 3, 2023	
Rep. Ramirez	Delia Ramirez (born 1983)	Democratic	Illinois's 3rd	January 3, 2023	
Rep. Salinas	Andrea Salinas (born 1969)	Democratic	Oregon's 6th	January 3, 2023	
Rep. Scholten	Hillary Scholten (born 1982)	Democratic	Michigan's 3rd	January 3, 2023	
Rep. Sykes	Emilia Sykes (born 1986)	Democratic	Ohio's 13th	January 3, 2023	
Rep. Tokuda	Jill Tokuda (born 1976)	Democratic	Hawaii's 2nd	January 3, 2023	
Rep. McClellan	Jennifer McClellan (born 1972)	Democratic	Virginia's 4th	March 7, 2023	
Rep. Maloy	Celeste Maloy (born 1981)	Republican	Utah's 2nd	November 28, 2023	
Rep. McIver	LaMonica McIver (born 1986)	Democratic	New Jersey's 10th	September 23, 2024	
Rep. Ansari	Yassamin Ansari (born 1992)	Democratic	Arizona's 3rd	January 3, 2025	
Rep. Biggs	Sheri Biggs (born 1970)	Republican	South Carolina's 3rd	January 3, 2025	
Rep. Bynum	Janelle Bynum (born 1975)	Democratic	Oregon's 5th	January 3, 2025	
Rep. Dexter	Maxine Dexter (born 1972)	Democratic	Oregon's 3rd	January 3, 2025	
Rep. Elfreth	Sarah Elfreth (born 1988)	Democratic	Maryland's 3rd	January 3, 2025	
Rep. Fedorchak	Julie Fedorchak (born 1968)	Republican	North Dakota's at-large	January 3, 2025	
Rep. Friedman	Laura Friedman (born 1966)	Democratic	California's 30th	January 3, 2025	
Rep. Gillen	Laura Gillen (born 1969)	Democratic	New York's 4th	January 3, 2025	
Rep. Goodlander	Maggie Goodlander (born 1986)	Democratic	New Hampshire's 2nd	January 3, 2025	
Rep. Johnson	Julie Johnson (born 1966)	Democratic	Texas's 32nd	January 3, 2025	January 3, 2027; Lost renomination
Del. King-Hinds	Kimberlyn King-Hinds (born 1975)	Republican	Northern Mariana Islands' at-large	January 3, 2025	
Rep. McBride	Sarah McBride (born 1990)	Democratic	Delaware's at-large	January 3, 2025	
Rep. McClain Delaney	April McClain Delaney (born 1964)	Democratic	Maryland's 6th	January 3, 2025	
Rep. McDonald Rivet	Kristen McDonald Rivet (born 1970)	Democratic	Michigan's 8th	January 3, 2025	
Rep. Morrison	Kelly Morrison (born 1969)	Democratic (DFL)	Minnesota's 3rd	January 3, 2025	
Rep. Pou	Nellie Pou (born 1956)	Democratic	New Jersey's 9th	January 3, 2025	
Rep. Randall	Emily Randall (born 1985)	Democratic	Washington's 6th	January 3, 2025	
Rep. Rivas	Luz Rivas (born 1974)	Democratic	California's 29th	January 3, 2025	
Rep. Simon	Lateefah Simon (born 1977)	Democratic	California's 12th	January 3, 2025	
Rep. Grijalva	Adelita Grijalva (born 1970)	Democratic	Arizona's 7th	November 12, 2025	
Rep. Mejia	Analilia Mejia (born 1977)	Democratic	New Jersey's 11th	April 20, 2026	
Rep. Wahab	Aisha Wahab (born 1987)	Democratic	California's 14th	September 2, 2026	

== Women who gave birth while serving in the House ==
There have been 15 women who gave birth at least once during their tenure as members of the House of Representatives.

During the 118th Congress, Congresswomen Anna Paulina Luna and Brittany Pettersen proposed different rule changes to allow proxy voting for new mothers (and new fathers per Pettersen's proposal). Congressmembers Sara Jacobs and Mike Lawler joined the cause during the 119th Congress. Pettersen has taken her infant child to several congressional committee meetings and also gave a speech on the floor of the House while holding her 9-week old son. Luna eventually dropped her demand for proxy voting, and settled on a formalization of a vote pairing system in which an absent member could seek a member who would otherwise vote the opposite way to abstain instead. This arrangement was passed on a party-line vote with Republicans supporting the vote pairing system and Democrats opposing it.

Representatives who gave birth while in office
Congresswoman	State or Territory	Party	Date of delivery	Mother's age	Notes
Yvonne Brathwaite Burke	California	Democratic	November 23, 1973	41	Gave birth to a daughter, Autumn, thus becoming the first woman to give birth while serving in either chamber of Congress.
Enid Greene Waldholtz	Utah	Republican	August 31, 1995	37	Gave birth to a daughter, Elizabeth.
Susan Molinari	New York	Republican	May 10, 1996	38	Gave birth to a daughter, Susan. The child's father was fellow congressman Bill Paxon.
Blanche Lincoln	Arkansas	Democratic	June 1996	35	Gave birth to twin boys, Bennett and Reece. Lincoln chose not to run for reelection due to her pregnancy.
Cathy McMorris Rodgers	Washington	Republican	April 29, 2007	37	Gave birth to a son, Cole.
Cathy McMorris Rodgers	Washington	Republican	December 1, 2010	41	Gave birth to a daughter, Grace, thus becoming the first woman in either chamber of Congress to give birth in office twice.
Cathy McMorris Rodgers	Washington	Republican	November 24, 2013	44	Gave birth to a daughter, Brynn, thus becoming the first woman in either chamber of Congress to give birth in office three times.
Kirsten Gillibrand	New York	Democratic	May 15, 2008	41	Gave birth to a son, Henry.
Stephanie Herseth Sandlin	South Dakota	Democratic	December 15, 2008	38	Gave birth to a son, Zachary. The child's father was former congressman Max Sandlin.
Linda Sánchez	California	Democratic	May 13, 2009	40	Gave birth to a son, Joaquin. Sánchez was unmarried when pregnancy announced, getting married a month before delivery.
Jaime Herrera Beutler	Washington	Republican	July 15, 2013	34	Gave birth to a daughter, Abigail.
Jaime Herrera Beutler	Washington	Republican	May 18, 2016	37	Gave birth to a son, Ethan.
Jaime Herrera Beutler	Washington	Republican	May 21, 2019	40	Gave birth to a daughter, Isana.
Tammy Duckworth	Illinois	Democratic	November 18, 2014	46	Gave birth to a daughter, Abigail. Duckworth later gave birth as a sitting United States senator, becoming the first sitting senator to give birth and the first woman to give birth while serving in each chamber of Congress.
Elise Stefanik	New York	Republican	August 27, 2021	37	Gave birth to a son, Sam Manda.
Anna Paulina Luna	Florida	Republican	August 26, 2023	34	Gave birth to a son, Henry.
Jenniffer González-Colón	Puerto Rico	Republican	February 16, 2024	47	Gave birth to fraternal twins, a daughter named Jenniffer Nydia Mercedes and a son named José Yovin.
Brittany Pettersen	Colorado	Democratic	January 25, 2025	43	Gave birth to a son, Samuel.
Kat Cammack	Florida	Republican	August 14, 2025	37	Gave birth to a daughter, Augusta Dair.

== See also ==
- Congressional Caucus for Women's Issues
- Democratic Women's Caucus
- List of female governors in the United States
- List of female speakers of legislatures in the United States
- Politics of the United States
- Republican Women's Caucus
- Sexism in American political elections
- Women in the United States Senate
