= Mother of the House (United Kingdom) =

Honorary position in the British parliament

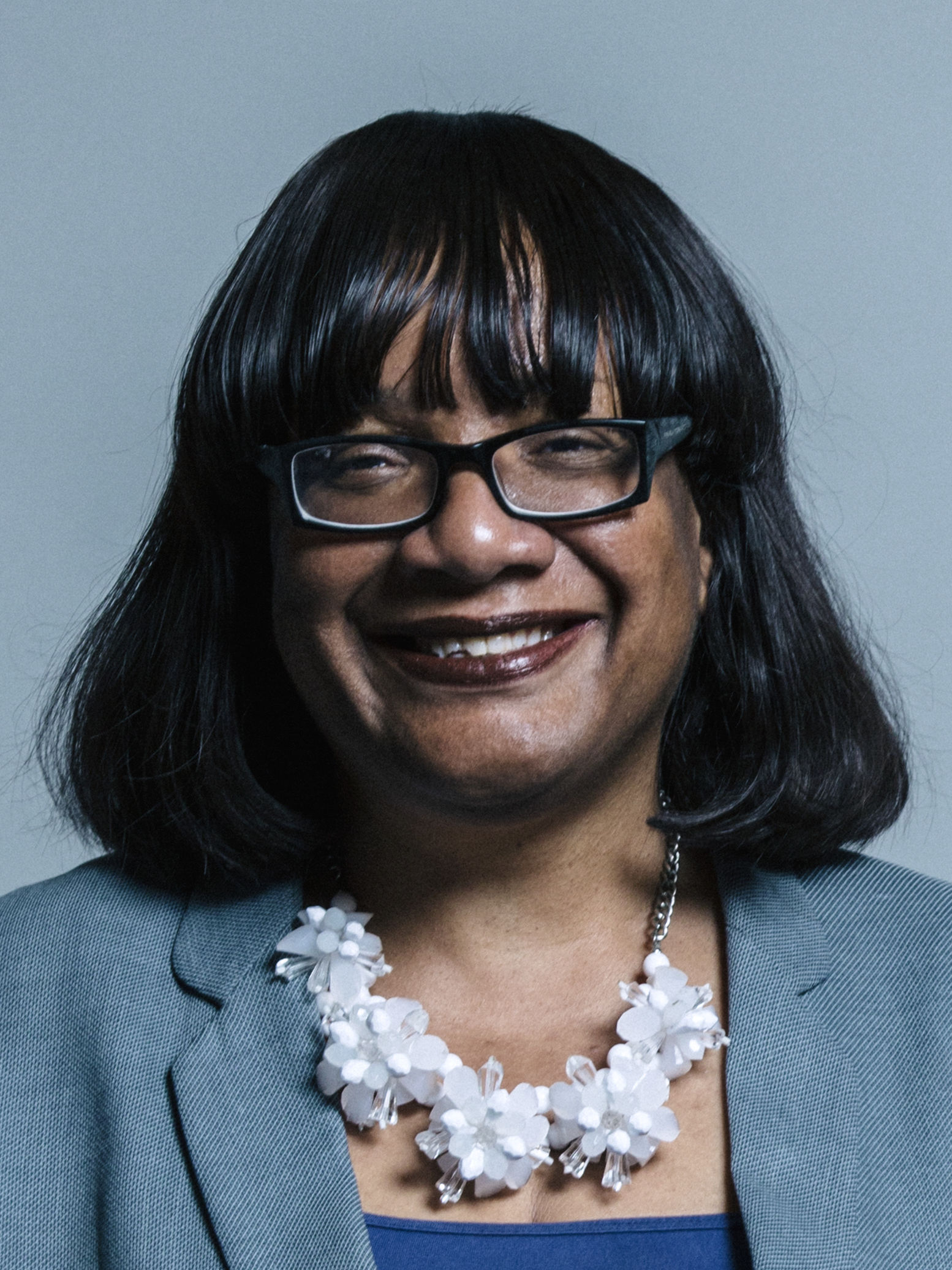
- Incumbent; Diane Abbott since 5 July 2024
- House of Commons of the United Kingdom
- Member of: House of Commons
- Seat: Westminster
- First holder: Harriet Harman (de facto); Diane Abbott

The Mother of the House is an honorific title given by tradition to the female Member of Parliament of the House of Commons in the United Kingdom with the longest uninterrupted service.

Since 5 July 2024 the Mother of the House is Diane Abbott.

== History ==
Although the term had been used previously, the first use of the term in a ceremonial capacity was by Theresa May during the first sitting of the House following the 2017 general election. In setting out the new tradition, Theresa May announced she was "breaking with tradition" by congratulating Harriet Harman as Mother of the House. The Centre on Constitutional Change attributes the normalisation and mainstreaming of the term to Harman, especially due to her prominence and leadership in the campaign to change the Standing Orders to allow female MPs taking maternity leave to vote in the House of Commons by proxy.

The term was used to refer to Harman for the remainder of her Parliamentary career, after which time Abbott became Mother of the House following her re-election as an MP on 4 July 2024.

Historically, the term was also used by MP Noel Billing in 1920 in reference to Nancy Astor who had been elected as the first female MP to take up her seat the previous year. Astor also used the term to refer to herself in 1945.

== Role ==
Similar to the titles of Father of the House and Baby of the House, the Mother of the House is not established by Standing Order but rather by convention. However, the role of Mother of the House gives the post holder great authority and legitimacy when speaking in debates.

The title is bestowed on the female parliamentarian with the longest uninterrupted service as MP calculated by the date of the election. When two MPs have served for the same duration, it is calculated depending on the date and time on which they took the Oath of Allegiance.

There is yet to be a female Member of Parliament who has sat longer than her male counterpart, making the Father of the House more senior.

Since 2024, the Mother of the House has sworn or affirmed their allegiance at the start of a new Parliament after the Speaker of the House and the Father of the House but before the Prime Minister and any other MPs.

== List ==
So far, no woman has been the longest-serving member of the House of Commons. The following is a chronological sequence of longest-serving female MPs via the seniority criteria used to determine the Mother of the House.

Whilst the term "Mother of the House" was first used in 1920 in reference to Nancy Astor, it did not have an official role or widespread use until 2017 when it was popularised in reference to Harriet Harman.

List of longest-serving female MPs
Name	Portrait	Entered Parliament	Became longest-serving female MP	Left the House	Party	Constituency	Notes
Nancy Astor		1919	1919	1945	Conservative	Plymouth Sutton	CH. Succeeded her husband Waldorf Astor, 2nd Viscount Astor as MP, after he became a member of the House of Lords by inheriting the title of Viscount Astor upon the death of his father. Constance Markievicz was the first woman elected to the House of Commons in 1918, representing Dublin St Patrick's in Ireland. As a member of Sinn Féin, she followed a policy of abstentionism and chose not to take her seat, instead joining the new Dáil Éireann.
Eleanor Rathbone		1929	1945	1946	Independent	Combined English Universities	Daughter of William Rathbone VI. Aunt of fellow MP John Rathbone, whose wife Beatrice Wright succeeded him. Hansard does not record which of Rathbone and Lloyd George was sworn in first in 1929.
Megan Lloyd George		1929	1945	1951	Liberal	Anglesey	CH. Youngest child of David Lloyd George (Prime Minister of the United Kingdom 1916–1922). Hansard does not record which of Rathbone and Lloyd George was sworn in first in 1929.
Frances Davidson		1937	1951	1959	Conservative	Hemel Hempstead	DBE. Succeeded her husband J. C. C. Davidson, 1st Viscount Davidson as MP, after he became a member of the House of Lords by being raised to the peerage as Viscount Davidson. Daughter of Willoughby Dickinson, 1st Baron Dickinson. She was created a life peer as Baroness Northchurch, of Chiswick in the County of Middlesex, in 1963.
Edith Summerskill		1938	1959	1961	Labour	Fulham West & Warrington	Resigned as an MP and was made a life peer as Baroness Summerskill, of Kenwood in the County of London. She was made a CH in 1966. Mother of Shirley Summerskill.
Jennie Lee		1929 & 1945	1961	1931 & 1970	Labour	North Lanarkshire & Cannock	Married to fellow MP Anuerin Bevan. She was made a life peer as Baroness Lee of Asheridge, of the City of Westminster, in 1970. Alice Bacon, Bessie Braddock, and Margaret Herbison all entered and left Parliament alongside Lee. Lee was the first new female MP sworn that day.
Barbara Castle		1945	1970	1979	Labour	Blackburn	Wife of Edward Castle, Baron Castle. She was made a life peer as Baroness Castle of Blackburn in 1990. Castle was sworn several minutes after Lee. Freda Corbet, who left Parliament in 1974, was sworn later that day.
Judith Hart		1959	1979	1987	Labour	Lanark, then Clydesdale	DBE. She was made a life peer as Baroness Hart of South Lanark in 1988.
Margaret Thatcher		1959	1987	1992	Conservative	Finchley	Sworn after Hart on the same day. Became Prime Minister in 1979 general election. OM. She was made a life peer as Baroness Thatcher, of Kesteven in the County of Lincolnshire, in 1992, and was made a KG in 1995.
Jill Knight		1966	1992	1997	Conservative	Birmingham Edgbaston	DBE. She was made a life peer as Baroness Knight of Collingtree, of Collingtree in the County of Northamptonshire, in 1997.
Gwyneth Dunwoody		1966 & 1974	1997	1970 & 2008	Labour	Exeter, Crewe, Crewe and Nantwich	Daughter of Morgan Phillips & Norah Phillips, Baroness Phillips. Mother of Tamsin Dunwoody.
Mothers of the House
Harriet Harman (de facto)		1982	2008	2024	Labour	Peckham (1982–1997); Camberwell and Peckham (1997–2024)	Harman was the longest continuously-serving female MP since the death of Gwyneth Dunwoody in 2008. With the normalisation and mainstreaming of the term "Mother of the House" in 2017, 2017 is the date used in reports and biographies for Harman becoming Mother of the House. She was made a life peer as Baroness Harman, of Peckham in the London Borough of Southwark, in 2024.
Diane Abbott		1987	2024	Incumbent	Labour (Note: Independent in April 2023 - May 2024 and July 2025 - July 2026)	Hackney North and Stoke Newington	Elected as a Labour MP. Whip suspended and later restored after a BBC Sounds interview in which she retracted an apology she had earlier made over remarks about racism in a 2023 editorial in The Observer.

== Scottish Parliament ==
The term was used to describe Dr. Winnie Ewing at the first meeting of the Scottish Parliament in 1999. However, in accordance with the standing orders of the Scottish Parliament she was referred to as the "Oldest Qualified Member" in the Scottish Parliament Official Report.

== See also ==
- Women in the House of Commons of the United Kingdom
- Records of members of parliament of the United Kingdom#Women
- List of female Members of the House of Commons of the United Kingdom
- Lists of female political office-holders in the United Kingdom
- Mother of the House (New Zealand)
- List of most senior women in the United States Congress
- Dean of the House
- Father of the House (UK)
