= Marjorie Holt =

American politician (1920–2018)

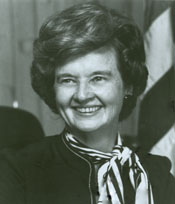

Member of the U.S. House of Representatives from Maryland's 4th district
- In office January 3, 1973 – January 3, 1987
- Preceded by: Paul Sarbanes
- Succeeded by: Charles Thomas McMillen

Personal details
- Born: Marjorie Sewell; September 17, 1920 Birmingham, Alabama, U.S.
- Died: January 6, 2018 (aged 97) Severna Park, Maryland, U.S.
- Party: Republican
- Spouse: Duncan Holt (died 2014)
- Education: Jacksonville University (attended); University of Florida (LLB)

Marjorie Holt (née Sewell; September 17, 1920 – January 6, 2018), a Republican, was a U.S. Congresswoman who represented Maryland's 4th congressional district from January 3, 1973, to January 3, 1987. She was the first Republican woman elected to Congress from Maryland. Holt died on January 6, 2018, in Severna Park, Maryland, aged 97.

== Early life and education ==
She was born in Birmingham, Alabama, and attended Jacksonville Junior College (now Jacksonville University). In 1940–1941 she attended the University of Florida College of Law and was admitted to the Florida bar in 1949 and the Maryland bar in 1962, and commenced practice in Anne Arundel County, Maryland

== Political career ==
In 1972, Holt was elected as a Republican to Congress and served from January 3, 1973, to January 3, 1987. She represented a district that stretched from Brooklyn Park to Eagle Harbor and included Glen Burnie, Annapolis and Crofton. The district also included Andrews Air Force Base. She did not seek reelection in 1986 and resumed the practice of law in Baltimore. She was nominated by President Ronald Reagan to be a member of the General Advisory Committee on Arms Control and Disarmament. She was a resident of Severna Park, Maryland.

== See also ==
- Women in the United States House of Representatives

U.S. House of Representatives
| Preceded by Paul Sarbanes | Member of the U.S. House of Representatives from Maryland's 4th congressional district 1973–1987 | Succeeded by C. Thomas McMillen |
Party political offices
| Preceded by LaMar Baker | Chair of the Republican Study Committee; 1975–1977 | Succeeded by Clair Burgener |
