= Frances Davidson, Viscountess Davidson =

British Conservative Party politician

The Right Honourable The Viscountess Davidson DBE
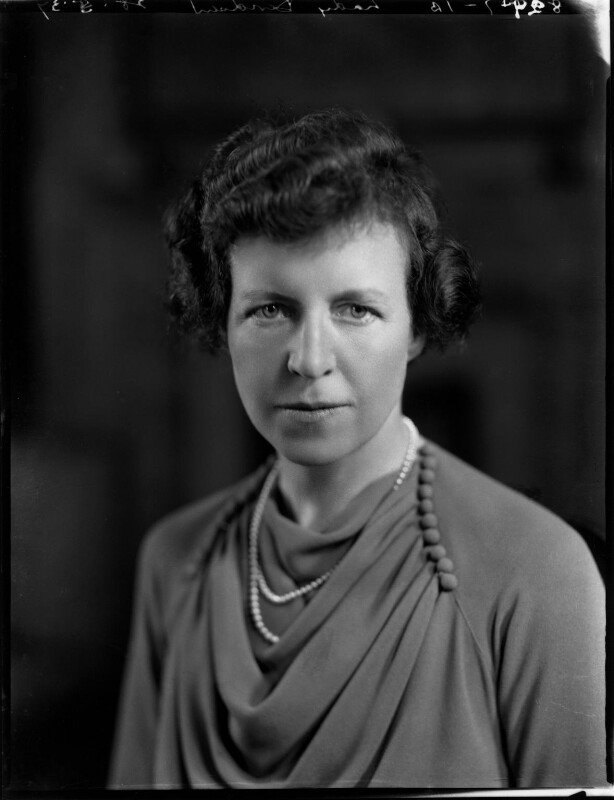

Member of the House of Lords Lord Temporal
- In office 13 January 1964 – 25 November 1985; Life Peerage

Member of Parliament for Hemel Hempstead
- In office 22 June 1937 – 18 September 1959
- Preceded by: Sir J.C.C. Davidson
- Succeeded by: James Allason

Personal details
- Born: Frances Joan Dickinson; 29 May 1894 London, England
- Died: 25 November 1985 (aged 91) Great Leighs, Essex, England
- Party: Conservative
- Spouse: J. C. C. Davidson
- Children: 4, including Andrew
- Parent(s): Sir Willoughby Dickinson; Elizabeth Meade

Frances Joan Davidson, Viscountess Davidson, Baroness Northchurch, DBE (née Dickinson; 29 May 1894 – 25 November 1985), styled Lady Davidson between 1935 and 1937 and as Viscountess Davidson between 1937 and 1985, was a British Conservative Party politician.

== Background and education ==
Frances Joan Dickinson was born in Kensington on 29 May 1894, the daughter of Sir Willoughby Dickinson, later Baron Dickinson. Her father, grandfather and great-grandfather were all Members of Parliament. She was educated at Kensington High School and Northfields, Englefield Green.

== Career ==
During World War I, she served in the Red Cross POW Department and was appointed OBE in 1919. When her husband, Sir J. C. C. Davidson, was created Viscount Davidson in 1937, she was elected at a by-election to succeed him as Conservative Member of Parliament (MP) for Hemel Hempstead. She held the seat until she retired from the House of Commons at the 1959 general election. For a short time after the 1945 general election, she was the only female Conservative MP.

== Honours and arms ==
She was appointed a Dame Commander of the Order of the British Empire (DBE) in the 1952 Birthday Honours and created a life peer as Baroness Northchurch, of Chiswick in the County of Middlesex, on 13 January 1963. She and her husband were one of the few couples who both held titles in their own right.

Coat of arms of Frances Davidson, Viscountess Davidson
| Escutcheon Two coats per pale: Dexter Argent on a fess Sable between in chief two pheons Azure and in base a boar's head erased of the second a portcullis chained Or (Davidson); sinister Or a bend cottised between two lions passant Gules (Dickinson). Supporters Dexter a horse Argent charged on the shoulder with a rose Gules barbed and seeded Proper, sinister a falcon Proper belled collared and lined Or. |

== Family ==
Davidson had two sons and two daughters (Margaret, Jean, Andrew and Malcolm). She died in the Essex village of Great Leighs from natural causes on 25 November 1985, at the age of 91. Both sons inherited their father's title, as Andrew Davidson, 2nd Viscount Davidson and Malcolm Davidson, 3rd Viscount Davidson.

Parliament of the United Kingdom
| Preceded by Sir J.C.C. Davidson | Member of Parliament for Hemel Hempstead; 1937 – 1959 | Succeeded by James Allason |
