= Lord Davidson =

Lord Davidson can refer to:

- Randall Davidson, 1st Baron Davidson of Lambeth (1848–1930)
- Neil Davidson, Baron Davidson of Glen Clova (born 1950)
- Holders of the Viscountcy of Davidson (created 1937):
  - J. C. C. Davidson, 1st Viscount Davidson (1889–1970)

== See also ==
- Ruth Davidson, Baroness Davidson of Lundin Links (born 1978)
