= Chelmer Fillies' Stakes =

Flat horse race in Britain

- Class: Listed
- Location: Chelmsford City Racecourse; Great Leighs, England
- Race type: Flat / Thoroughbred
- Website: Chelmsford City

Race information
- Distance: 6f (1,207 metres)
- Surface: Polytrack
- Track: Left-handed
- Qualification: Three-year-old fillies
- Weight: 9 st 2 lb Penalties; 4 lb for Group 1 /2 winners* 2 lb for Group 3 winners * * since 31 August last year
- Purse: £80,000 (2025); 1st: £45,368

Chelmer Fillies' Stakes
2025
Lady With The Lamp	Hold A Dream	Star Of Mehmas

Previous years
2024
Pandora's Gift	Tazara	Jabaara
2023
Believing	Catherine Of Siena	Marine Wave
2022
Tippy Toes	Symphony Perfect	Morag Mccullagh
2021
Happy Romance	Chocoya	Dense Star

2020-2019
2019
Isaan Queen	Chapelli	Red Impression

The Chelmer Fillies' Stakes is a Listed flat horse race in Great Britain open to fillies aged three years. It is run over a distance of 6 furlongs (1,216 metres) at Chelmsford City in late April or early May.

The race was created as a new Listed race in 2019.

== Winners ==
Year	Winner	Jockey	Trainer	Time
2019	Isaan Queen	Oisin Murphy	Archie Watson	1:11.61
	no race 2020 (Note: The 2020 running was cancelled because of the COVID-19 pandemic in the United Kingdom)
2021	Happy Romance	Sean Levey	Richard Hannon Jr.	1:10.55
2022	Tippy Toes	Joe Fanning	Charlie and Mark Johnston	1:11.03
2023	Believing	James Doyle	George Boughey	1:10.49
2024	Pandora's Gift	Rossa Ryan	Stuart Williams	1:10.87
2025	Lady With The Lamp	Dylan Browne McMonagle	Joseph O'Brien	1:10.23
2026 (Note: The 2026 running took place on turf at Goodwood due to Chelmsford City losing its BHA racing licence)	Soul Love	Pierre-Louis Jamin	Karl Burke	1:09.92

== See also ==
- Horse racing in Great Britain
- List of British flat horse races
