= Charles Thomas Le Quesne =

British Liberal Party politician and barrister (1885–1954)

Charles Thomas Le Quesne (3 November 1885 – 22 November 1954), was a Jersey born, British Liberal Party politician and barrister.

== Background ==
He was born in Saint Helier, Jersey, the son of Charles John Le Quesne. He was educated at Victoria College, Jersey and Exeter College, Oxford where he received a 1st class Honors in Mods in 1906 and a 1st class in Lit. Hum. in 1908. He married Eileen Gould. They had four sons and one daughter.

== Legal career ==
He was called to the bar, at Inner Temple, in 1912. He took silk, becoming a King's Counsel in 1925. In 1950, he returned to Jersey and was appointed Lieutenant Bailiff. Up to this point, the Royal Court's judgments were in the French style of jugements motivés, written in French by the Greffier rather than the judge, and expressing the reasons for the court's decision only very briefly. Le Quesne changed the language of judgments to English and adopted the common law style of judgments, where the judge gives detailed reasons for accepting or rejecting the rival submissions made at trial by counsel.

== Political career ==
In 1908 he was President of the Oxford Union. He was a last minute Liberal candidate for the Hemel Hempstead Division of Hertfordshire at the 1929 General Election;

General Election 1929: Hemel Hempstead Electorate 38,957
Party	Candidate	Votes	%	±%
Unionist	Rt Hon. John Colin Campbell Davidson	15,145	49.8	−7.8
Liberal	Charles Thomas Le Quesne	11,631	38.3	+2.8
Labour	A E R Millar	3,624	11.9	+5.0
Majority		3,514	11.5	
Turnout			78.0	−2.2
Unionist hold		Swing	-5.3	

Following the formation of the National Government in 1931, an election was called. Le Quesne stood again as a Liberal in support of the government but his main opponent, the Conservative was also a supporter;

General Election 1931: Hemel Hempstead Electorate 42,267
Party	Candidate	Votes	%	±%
Conservative	Rt Hon. John Colin Campbell Davidson	21,946	67.2	+17.4
Liberal	Charles Thomas Le Quesne	8,021	24.6	−13.7
Labour	A E R Millar	2,677	8.2	−3.3
Majority		13,925	42.7	+31.2
Turnout			77.2	−0.8
Conservative hold		Swing	+15.5	

In June 1936 he was elected to serve on the Liberal Party Council. From 1946-47 he was President of the Baptist Union of Great Britain and Ireland. He was made a Commander of the Dutch Order of Orange-Nassau.
