= Little Leighs =

Village in Essex, England

Coordinates: 51.8235°N 0.4926°E

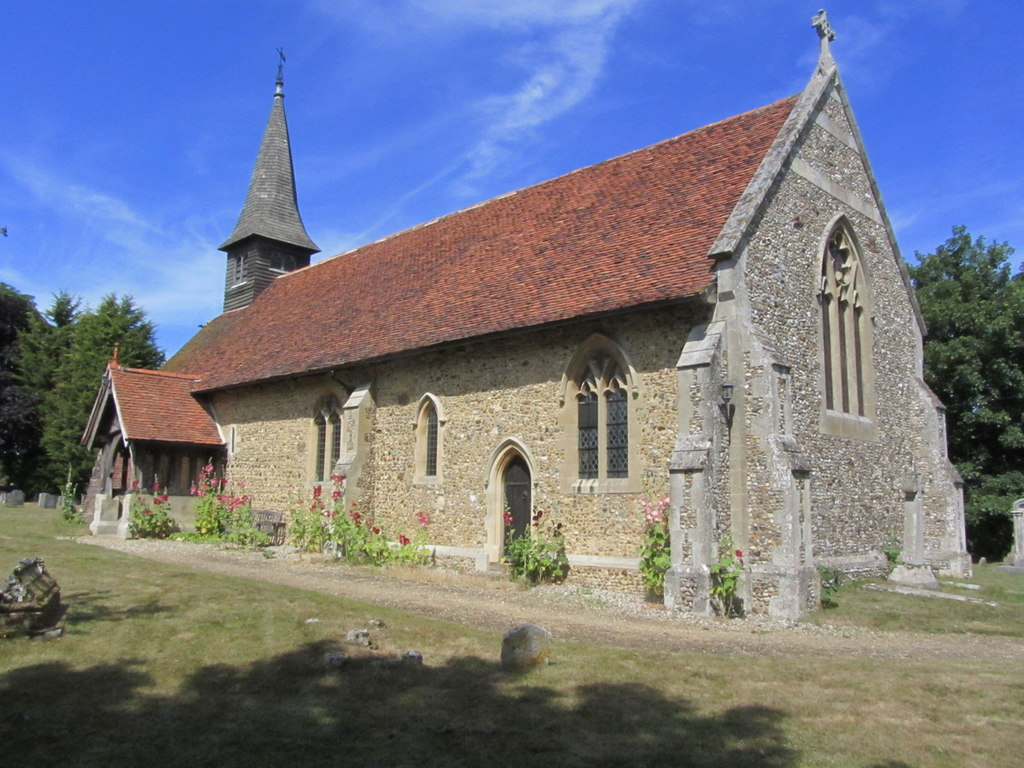
- Church of St John the Evangelist

- Location within Essex
- Civil parish: Great and Little Leighs
- District: Chelmsford
- Shire county: Essex
- Region: East
- Country: England
- Sovereign state: United Kingdom
- Post town: CHELMSFORD

Little Leighs is a village in the civil parish of Great and Little Leighs, in the Chelmsford district of Essex, England. Little Leighs lies beside the River Ter, just south of the village of Great Leighs and west of the A131 road.

== History ==
The name Leighs comes from the Old English leah meaning a clearing in a wood.

In Saxon times there appears to have been a single vill called Leighs. It was recorded in the Domesday Book of 1086 as Lega in the Chelmsford hundred of Essex. The vill was at that time split between two owners.

No church or priest was mentioned at Leighs in the Domesday Book, but it subsequently came to be administered as two parishes, Great Leighs and Little Leighs. The church of St John the Evangelist at Little Leighs dates back to the early 12th century.

In 1949 the parish was merged with neighbouring Great Leighs to form a new civil parish called "Great and Little Leighs". At the 1931 census (the last before the abolition of the civil parish), Little Leighs had a population of 158.
