= Gustavus Talbot =

British politician

Member of Parliament for Hemel Hempstead
- In office 14 December 1918 – 16 October 1920
- Preceded by: Constituency established
- Succeeded by: J. C. C. Davidson

Personal details
- Born: Gustavas Arthur Chetwynd-Talbot; 24 December 1848 Withington, Gloucestershire, England
- Died: 16 October 1920 (aged 71) Hemel Hempstead, Hertfordshire, England
- Party: Coalition Conservative
- Spouse: Susan Frances Talbot (née Elwes)
- Children: 1 son and 1 daughter

Gustavus Arthur Talbot (24 December 1848 – 16 October 1920) was a British member of parliament and a Coalition Conservative politician. He was the member of parliament (MP) for Hemel Hempstead from 1918 until his death in 1920.

Talbot was born on 24 December 1848 at Withington, Gloucestershire, the son of the Reverend George Chetwynd-Talbot and he was educated at Wellington College, Berkshire. He became a member of the Legislative Council of Ceylon. Talbot was a justice of the peace and between 1914 and 1920 he was mayor of Hemel Hempstead.

He married Susan Frances Talbot, the daughter of Robert Elwes.

On 14 December 1918 he was elected as member of parliament for the new constituency of Hemel Hempstead as a Coalition Conservative. He died in office on 16 October 1920 at his home Marchmont House in Hemel Hempstead.

Parliament of the United Kingdom
Preceded by None	Member of Parliament for Hemel Hempstead; 1918–1920	Succeeded by J. C. C. Davidson
