= David Taylor (Hemel Hempstead MP) =

British Labour Party politician

David Taylor MP
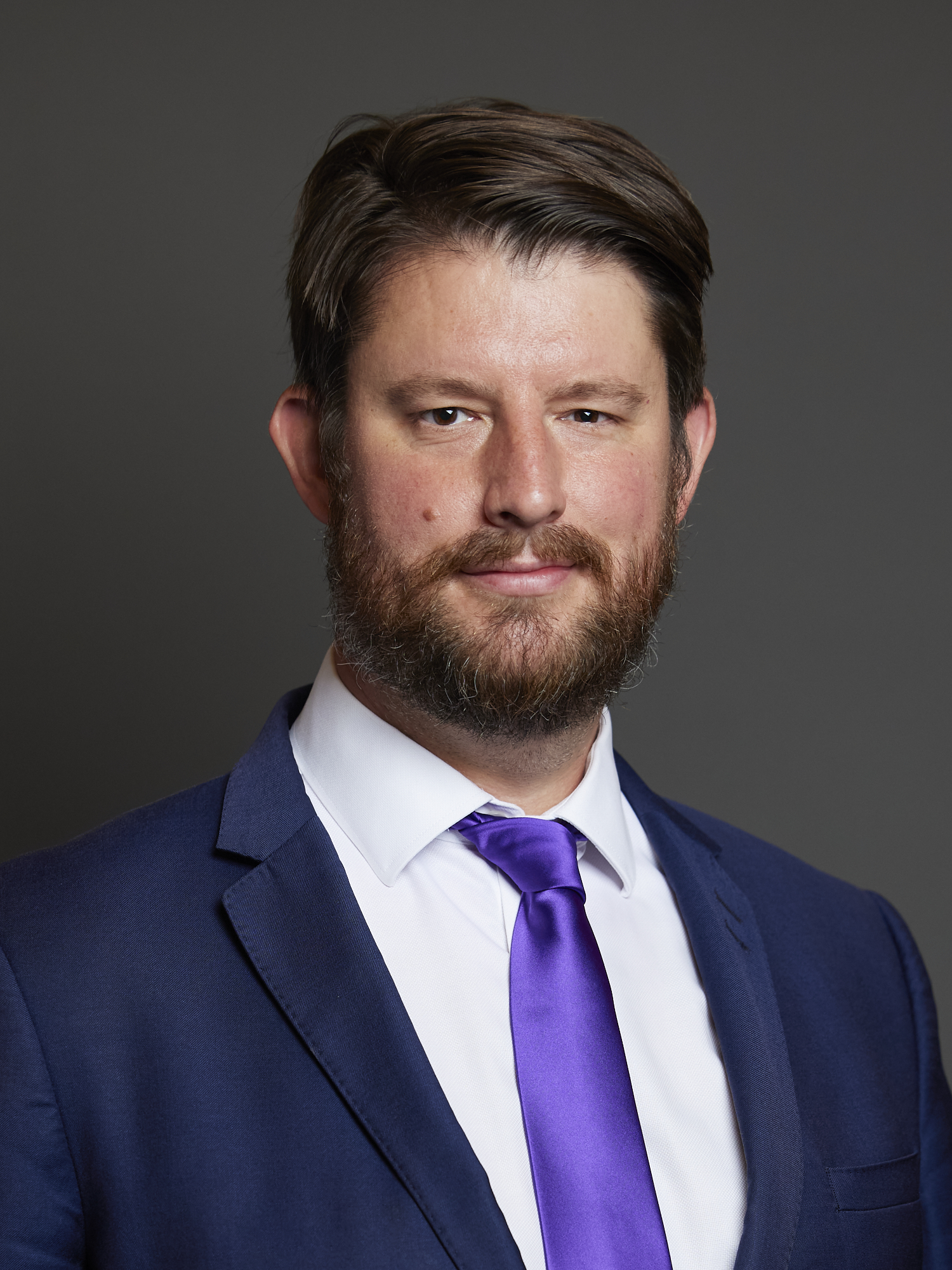
- Official portrait, 2024

Member of Parliament for Hemel Hempstead
- Incumbent
- Assumed office 4 July 2024
- Preceded by: Mike Penning
- Majority: 4,857 (11.0%)

Member of Youth Parliament for Hemel Hempstead
- In office 2001–2003

Personal details
- Born: David Robert Taylor Hemel Hempstead
- Party: Labour

David Robert Taylor is a British Labour Party politician who has served as the Member of Parliament for Hemel Hempstead since 2024.

Following the Second World War, Taylor's grandparents on both sides moved to Hemel Hempstead and his parents were born and raised there. Taylor represented Hemel Hempstead in the UK Youth Parliament from 2001 to 2003.

== Career ==
Prior to being elected to parliament, Taylor worked as a Parliamentary Assistant to the Labour MP Ann Mckechin, and from 2010 until 2013 worked for the Office of Gordon and Sarah Brown.

Taylor then worked for the international charity Oxfam and then The Fairtrade Foundation.

In 2009, Taylor founded the Labour Campaign for International Development, and later sat as its vice-chair.

== Parliamentary career ==
At the 2024 general election, Taylor was elected as the Labour Member of Parliament for Hemel Hempstead, with 38.2% of the vote and a majority of 4,857 over Conservative Candidate Andrew Williams. Taylor replaced Mike Penning, who had held the seat for the Conservatives since 2005.

Taylor was elected to the International Development Select Committee in October 2022. In March 2026, Taylor was appointed the UK's new Trade Envoy to Japan.

In May 2026, Taylor implored the Home Office to revoke the visa of leftist US streamer Hasan Piker, alleging that Piker's past commentary on Israel and Palestine amounted to support for terrorism. Days later, both Piker and Cenk Uygur were not allowed entry into the UK to speak at SXSW London Festival.

Following the 2026 May Local Election results, Taylor signed a letter in support of then Prime Minister, Keir Starmer, and opposed a leadership election.

Parliament of the United Kingdom
| Preceded by Mike Penning | Member of Parliament for Hemel Hempstead; 2024–present | Incumbent |
