= Andrew Davidson, 2nd Viscount Davidson =

British politician and peer (1928–2012)

The Right Honourable The Viscount Davidson

Deputy Chief Whip of the House of Lords Captain of the Yeomen of the Guard
- In office 10 September 1986 – 30 December 1991
- Monarch: Elizabeth II
- Prime Minister: Margaret Thatcher; John Major
- Preceded by: The Earl of Swinton
- Succeeded by: The Earl of Strathmore and Kinghorne

Lord-in-waiting Government Whip
- In office 17 September 1985 – 10 September 1986
- Prime Minister: Margaret Thatcher
- Preceded by: The Earl of Caithness
- Succeeded by: The Lord Hesketh

Member of the House of Lords
- Lord Temporal
- In office 12 December 1970 – 11 November 1999 as a hereditary peer
- Preceded by: The 1st Viscount Davidson
- Succeeded by: Seat abolished (Note: Pursuant to the House of Lords Act 1999.)

Personal details
- Born: John Andrew Davidson; 22 December 1928 Westminster, England
- Died: 20 July 2012 (aged 83)
- Party: Conservative
- Spouse(s): 1) Margaret Birgitta Norton; 2) Pamela Joy Vergette
- Children: 4
- Parent(s): J. C. C. Davidson; Frances Dickinson
- Education: Pembroke College, Cambridge.

John Andrew Davidson, 2nd Viscount Davidson (22 December 1928 – 20 July 2012), was a British hereditary peer and Conservative politician. Regarded as a safe pair of hands, he became deputy chief whip in the House of Lords.

== Background and education ==
Davidson was the elder son of J. C. C. Davidson, 1st Viscount Davidson, and his wife Frances (née Dickinson), daughter of Willoughby Dickinson, 1st Baron Dickinson. He was educated at Westminster School and Pembroke College, Cambridge. Between 1947 and 1949 he served in the Black Watch and the 5th Battalion of the King's African Rifles before going up to Pembroke College, where he was known for his thespian talents, being president of the Footlights in 1951. In 1960 he embarked on a 15-year career in large-scale farming, as a director of Strutt and Parker (Farms) and Lord Rayleigh Farms. By 1965 he was on the council of the Country Landowners Association (now the Country Land & Business Association). In 1966 he was appointed chairman of the Royal Eastern Counties Hospital for the mentally handicapped at Colchester, a job he considered the "most frustrating" of his life. Tensions with the regional hospital board which was ultimately responsible for the hospital boiled over in 1971, ostensibly because of the way Mauritian employees had been treated, and the following March the board sacked five members of the management committee.

== Political career ==
Davidson entered the House of Lords on the death of his father in 1970. He served in the Conservative administrations of Margaret Thatcher and John Major as a Lord-in-waiting between 1985 and 1986. Davidson served as the Deputy Chief Whip in the House of Lords from 1986 to 1992, and held the ceremonial position of Captain of the Yeomen of the Guard. He lost his seat in Parliament after the passing of the House of Lords Act 1999, commenting: "I am getting on and maybe the younger generation should get a shot at it."

== Marriages and children ==
Lord Davidson was married twice. He married firstly Margaret Birgitta Norton, daughter of Major General Cyril Henry Norton, on 30 June 1956. They had four daughters:

- Hon. Alexandra Frances Margaret Davidson (13 April 1957 – 1995)
- Hon. Georgiana Caroline Davidson (born 16 May 1958), married Lord Edward Somerset, a younger son of David Somerset, 11th Duke of Beaufort. In 2014, Lord Edward was jailed for 2 years for assaulting his wife.
- Hon. Camilla Birgitta Davidson (born 17 February 1963)
- Hon. Kristina Louise Davidson (born 17 February 1963)

They were divorced in 1974 and Lady Davidson subsequently married Mark Colville, 4th Viscount Colville of Culross.

On 6 June 1975, Lord Davidson married secondly Pamela Joy Vergette (now deceased), daughter of John Vergette. They had no children.

== Death ==
Viscount Davidson died on 20 July 2012 at the age of 83 and was succeeded in the viscountcy by his younger brother Malcolm Davidson, 3rd Viscount Davidson (1934–2019), also a Pembroke alumnus.

== Arms ==
Coat of arms of Andrew Davidson, 2nd Viscount Davidson
Crest A lion passant Gules charged on the shoulder with a pheon Or and holding in the dexter paw a torch inflamed Proper. Escutcheon Argent on a fess Sable between in chief two pheons Azure and in base a boar's head erased of the second a portcullis chained Or. Supporters On the dexter side a horse Argent charged on the shoulder with a rose Gules barbed and seeded Proper and on the sinister side a horse Sable charged on the shoulder with a martlet Or. Motto Lux Ex Tenebris

== Notes ==
Political offices
Preceded by The Earl of Swinton	Captain of the Yeomen of the Guard; 1986–1991	Succeeded by The Earl of Strathmore and Kinghorne
Peerage of the United Kingdom
Preceded by J. C. C. Davidson	Viscount Davidson; 1970–2012; Member of the House of Lords (1970–1999)	Succeeded by Malcolm Davidson
