= Great and Little Leighs =

Civil parish in Essex, England

Coordinates: 51°49′37″N 0°30′18″E

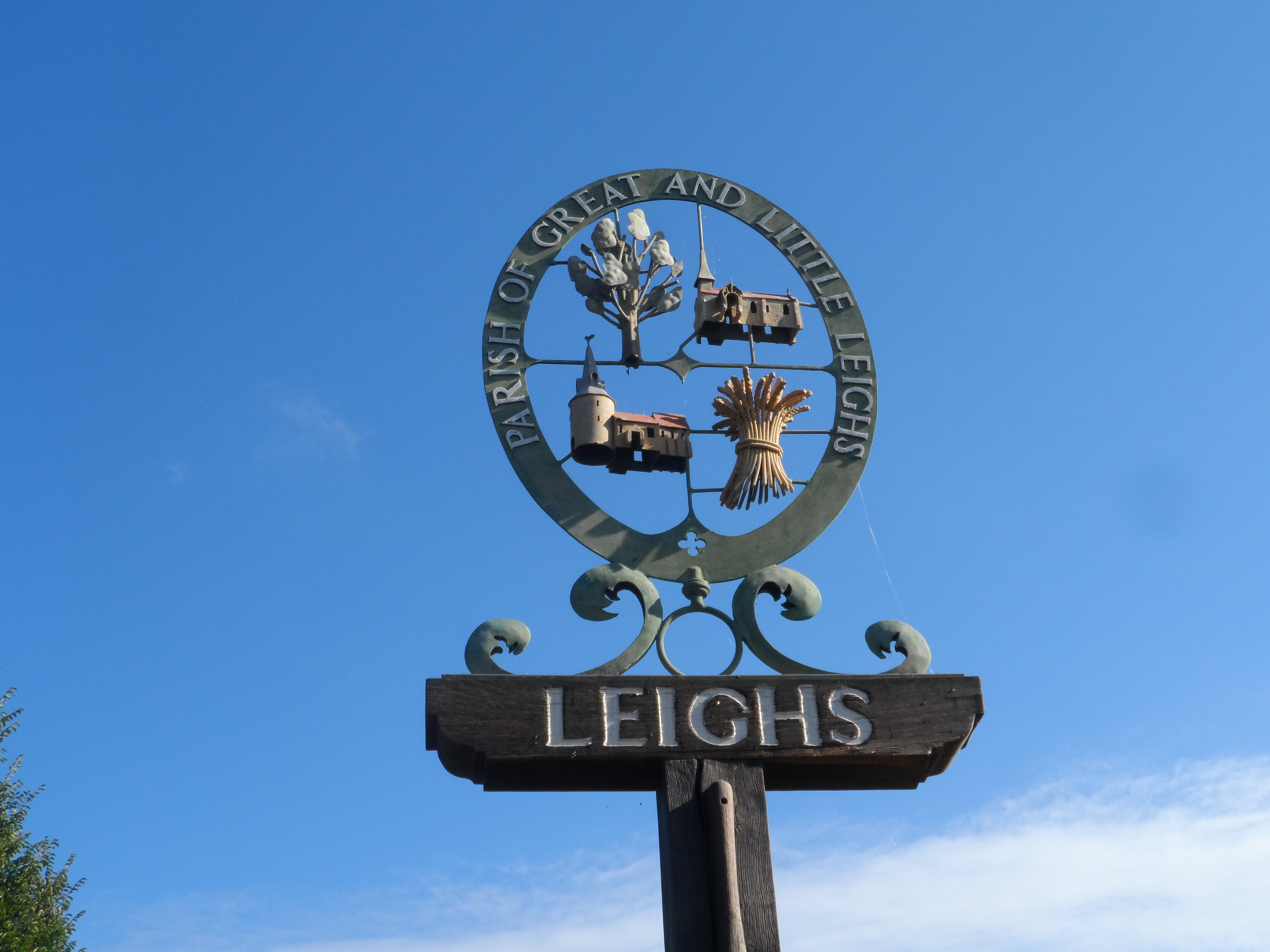
- Parish sign in Great Leighs

- Location within Essex
- Population: 2,968 (Parish, 2021)
- Civil parish: Great and Little Leighs
- District: Chelmsford
- Shire county: Essex
- Region: East
- Country: England
- Sovereign state: United Kingdom
- Post town: CHELMSFORD
- Postcode district: CM3 1
- Dialling code: 01245
- Police: Essex
- Fire: Essex
- Ambulance: East of England
- UK Parliament: Chelmsford

Great and Little Leighs is a civil parish in the Chelmsford district of Essex, England. The main village in the parish is Great Leighs. The parish also includes Little Leighs and a number of small hamlets in the surrounding rural area. It lies 4 miles (6 km) south of Braintree and 6 miles (10 km) north of Chelmsford. At the 2021 census the parish had a population of 2,968.

== History ==
The name Leighs comes from the Old English leah meaning a clearing in a wood.

In Saxon times there appears to have been a single vill called Leighs. It was recorded in the Domesday Book of 1086 as Lega in the Chelmsford hundred of Essex. The vill was at that time split between two owners.

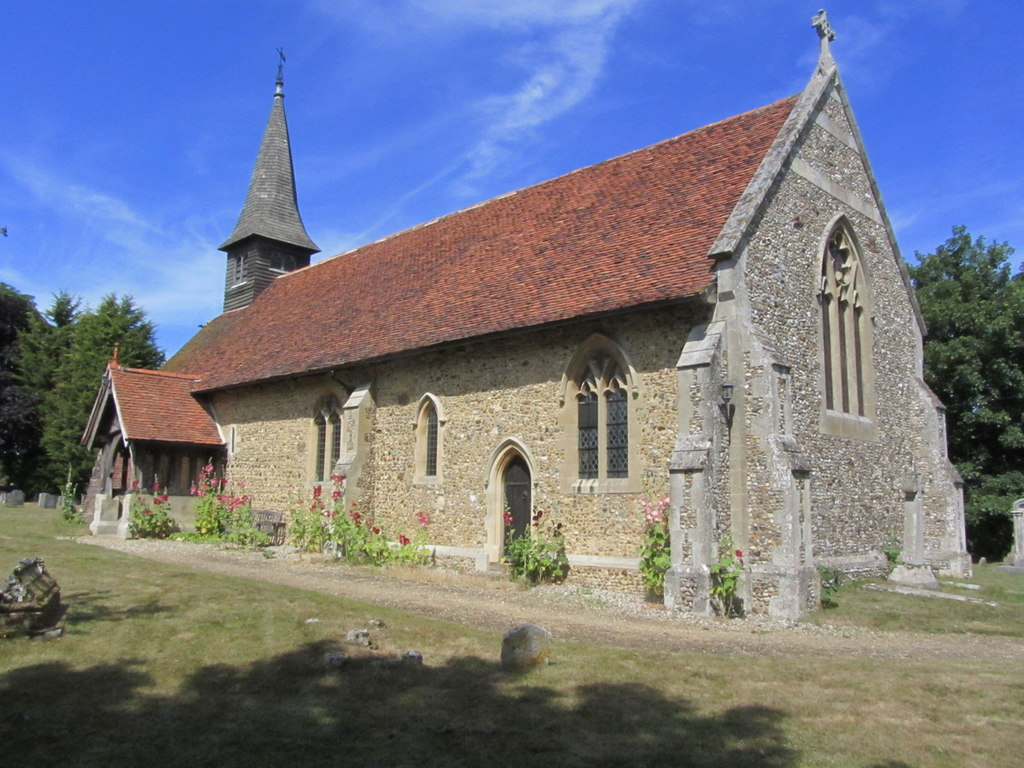
St John the Evangelist's Church, Little Leighs

No church or priest was mentioned at Leighs in the Domesday Book, but it subsequently came to be administered as two parishes, Great Leighs and Little Leighs. The church of St John the Evangelist at Little Leighs dates back to the early 12th century. Great Leigh's parish church of St Mary dates back to the late 12th century and has a distinctive round tower.

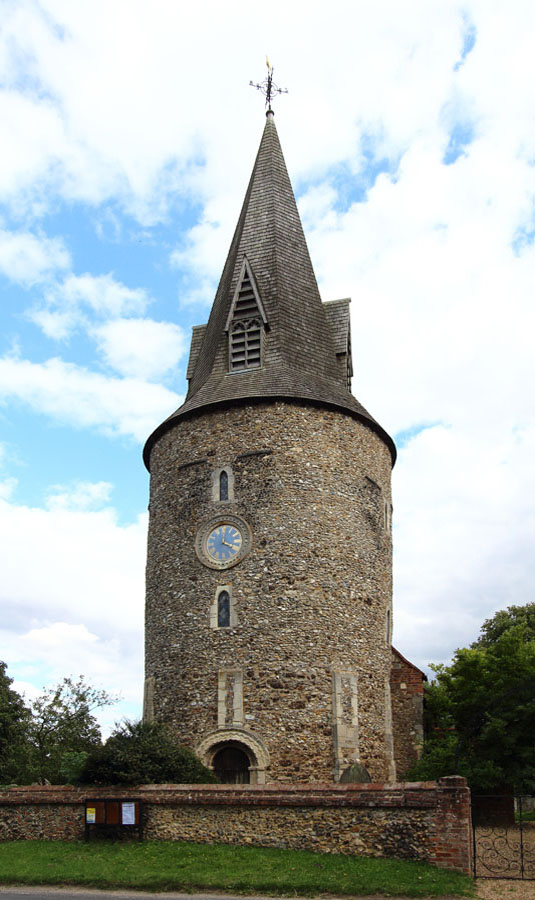
St Mary's Church, Great Leighs

St Mary's Church stands 1 mile (1.6 km) south-east of the main part of the modern village of Great Leighs. The modern village was historically known as the hamlet of Chatley and stands on the old road (formerly the A131, now bypassed to the west) linking Chelmsford to Braintree. Whilst in the Domesday Book the whole of Leighs was listed in Chelmsford hundred, the hamlet of Chatley came to be part of the Witham hundred whereas the rest of Great Leighs parish remained in the Chelmsford hundred.

In 1949 the two parishes of Great Leighs and Little Leighs were merged into a new civil parish called Great Leighs and Little Leighs. The two parishes have also now been merged for ecclesiastical purposes with neighbouring Little Waltham to form an ecclesiastical parish called Great and Little Leighs and Little Waltham.

== Governance ==
Great and Little Leighs Parish Council meets at the Leighs Village Hall on Boreham Road in Great Leighs.
