= Mike Penning =

British Conservative politician (born 1957)

The Right Honourable Sir Mike Penning
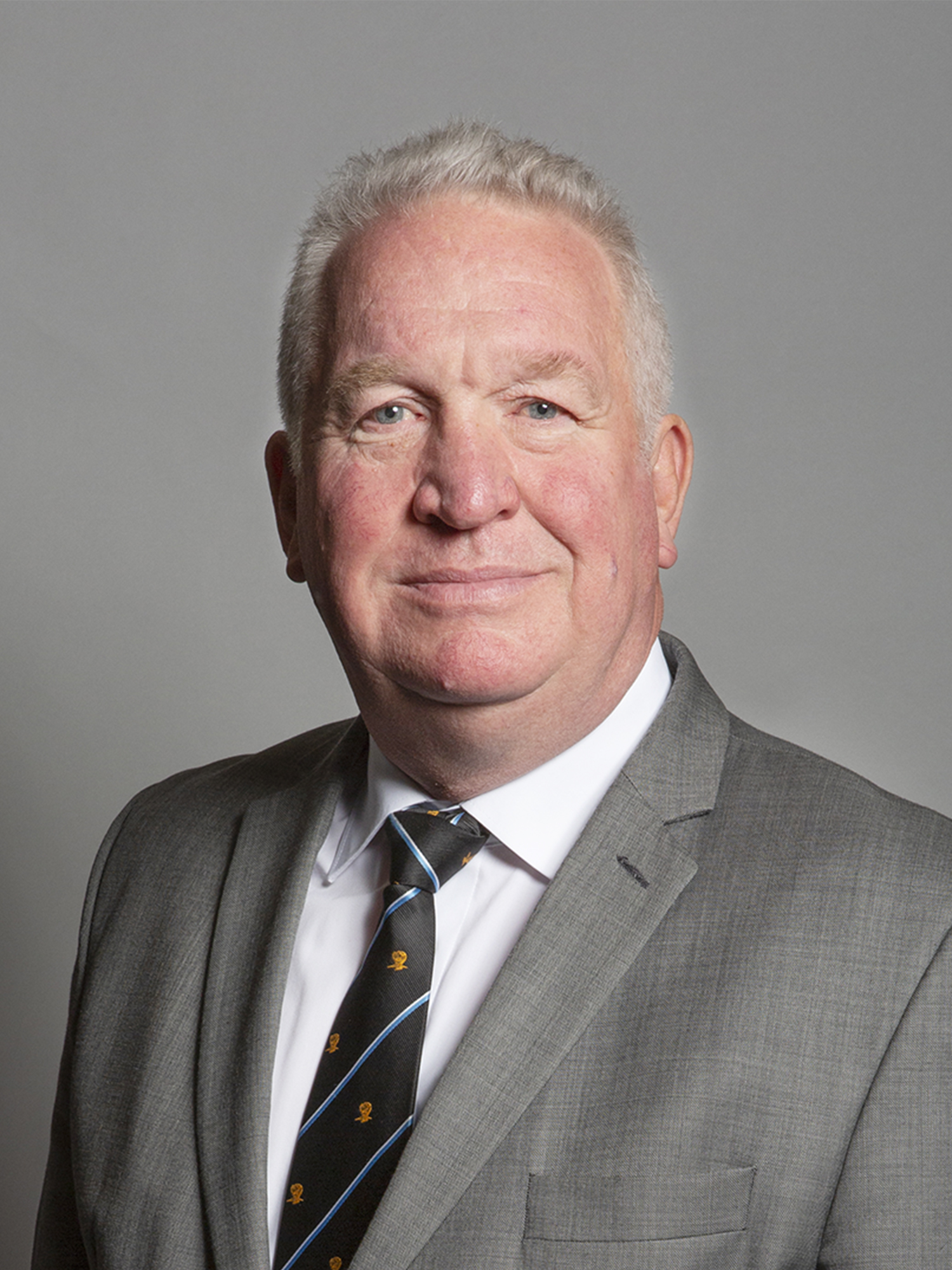
- Official portrait, 2019

Minister of State for the Armed Forces
- In office 15 July 2016 – 12 June 2017
- Prime Minister: Theresa May
- Preceded by: Penny Mordaunt
- Succeeded by: Mark Lancaster

Minister of State for Justice
- In office 15 July 2014 – 15 July 2016
- Prime Minister: David Cameron
- Preceded by: Jeremy Wright
- Succeeded by: Oliver Heald

Minister of State for Policing
- In office 15 July 2014 – 15 July 2016
- Prime Minister: David Cameron
- Preceded by: Damian Green
- Succeeded by: Brandon Lewis

Minister of State for Disabled People
- In office 7 October 2013 – 15 July 2014
- Prime Minister: David Cameron
- Preceded by: Esther McVey
- Succeeded by: Mark Harper

Minister of State for Northern Ireland
- In office 4 September 2012 – 7 October 2013
- Prime Minister: David Cameron
- Preceded by: Hugo Swire
- Succeeded by: Andrew Robathan

Parliamentary Under-Secretary of State for Transport
- In office 12 May 2010 – 4 September 2012
- Prime Minister: David Cameron
- Preceded by: Chris Mole
- Succeeded by: Stephen Hammond

Member of Parliament for Hemel Hempstead
- In office 5 May 2005 – 30 May 2024
- Preceded by: Tony McWalter
- Succeeded by: David Taylor

Personal details
- Born: 28 September 1957 (age 68) Finchley, Middlesex, England
- Party: Conservative
- Spouse: Angela Smith
- Children: 2 daughters

Military service
- Allegiance: United Kingdom
- Branch/service: Grenadier Guards
- Years of service: 1974–1980
- Rank: Guardsman
- Commands: Kenya; Germany; Northern Ireland

Sir Michael Alan Penning (born 28 September 1957) is a British Conservative Party politician, who served as the member of parliament (MP) for Hemel Hempstead from 2005 to 2024.

Penning was the minister of state for the Armed Forces from 2016 to 2017, having previously served as the minister of state for justice and minister of state for policing from 2014 to 2016, the minister for disabled people from 2013 to 2014, the minister of state for Northern Ireland from 2012 to 2013, and the minister of state for transport from 2010 to 2012. Following his ministerial career he remained a backbencher until standing down in 2024.

== Early life and career ==
Penning was born in Finchley, Middlesex, and raised in the county of Essex. He first went to school in South Benfleet before attending King Edmund School in Rochford. After leaving school, Penning enlisted in the British Army as a Grenadier Guardsman, and served several tours in Northern Ireland, Kenya and Germany. During his time in the Grenadiers, an officer, Captain Robert Nairac, GC, was abducted and murdered by the IRA.

After leaving the Army, Penning subsequently worked as a firefighter for Essex County Fire and Rescue Service, before joining his family business and then becoming a political journalist.

== Political career ==
In the mid-1990s, Penning worked as a media adviser to the Euro-rebels who had had the Conservative Party whip removed by Prime Minister John Major during the Maastricht rebellion. He was subsequently the election agent to Sir Teddy Taylor during the 1997 general election. He stood for election in Thurrock at the 2001 general election, coming second to Labour's Andrew MacKinlay. Following this, he was appointed as a chief adviser to William Hague as Leader of the Opposition, later becoming the Conservative Party's deputy head of media under the brief and unpopular leadership of Iain Duncan Smith.

=== Member of parliament ===
At the 2005 general election Penning stood in the Labour-held seat of Hemel Hempstead, narrowly defeating sitting MP Tony McWalter. Penning overturned McWalter's 2001 majority of 3,742 votes and won the seat (after a partial recount) by 499 votes. In July 2007, Penning was promoted by Conservative leader David Cameron to the post of shadow minister for public health.

The Buncefield fire occurred on 11 December 2005 and led to some 2,700 claims for compensation. In the words of neighbouring MP Peter Lilley, "There is something providential about the fact that the worst fire in western Europe since the Second World War should occur in a constituency represented by a fireman. It was undoubtedly in the interests of all his constituents and mine to have someone so knowledgeable, as well as so vigorous in their response, to represent their interests." Penning, who arrived on the scene within half an hour of the explosion, had himself been trained to deal with much smaller petroleum fires; the scenario was that one tank not twenty was affected.

Dexion workers, 700 of whom worked in the constituency, lost their pensions when the company went into receivership in 2003. Dexion played a prominent part in Ros Altmann's Pensions theft campaign. Penning, whose support for Dexion preceded his election, offered compensation from unclaimed assets in his 2005 Manifesto and has spoken on the issue 26 times in Parliament. Dexion pensioners were featured celebrating a victory at the High Court in February 2007 which eventually led to increased compensation from the then-Labour government.

According to Theyworkforyou.com, Penning spoke in an "above average" number of debates from 2009 to 2010 and replied to a "very high number" of messages. He also received replies to an "above average" number of written questions. The quality of those questions was disputed by a 2006 The Times article about the Theyworkforyou website which Penning used to email constituents. His 624 questions in 10 months included one on sales of lost property in Royal Parks since records began. The newspaper suggested the objective was to increase ratings on the website, an allegation rejected by Penning.

Penning "occasionally rebelled", with two per cent of his votes being against the whip, and was "very strongly" in favour of a smoking ban. Penning's parliamentary expenses details have been published as part of a general publication of all MPs' expenses. In 2009, he claimed a total of £135,078, 502nd of all MPs. The Legg Report found no problem with his expenses. Penning did, however, voluntarily repay £2.99 for a dog bowl, which was the lowest recorded repayment by any MP.

==== Subsequent elections ====
Penning achieved one of the largest increases in his majority of all MPs at the 2010 general election, when he took 50% of the vote share to hold the seat with a majority of 13,406. This result relegated Labour's Ayfer Orhan to third place behind the Liberal Democrat candidate Richard Grayson, representing the largest swing from the Labour Party to the Conservative Party (a 14.4% swing) in the country.

In the 2015 general election, Penning increased his majority by 2.9% to 52.9% to hold his seat with a 14,420 majority. In the subsequent reshuffle, Penning was appointed as minister of state in the Home Office for policing and criminal justice. In the June 2017 general election he held Hemel Hempstead with a reduced majority of 9,445, but with an increased share of the vote (55%). He was re-elected in the 2019 general election.

On 17 May 2022, he announced that he would stand down at the 2024 general election.

=== Minister of state ===
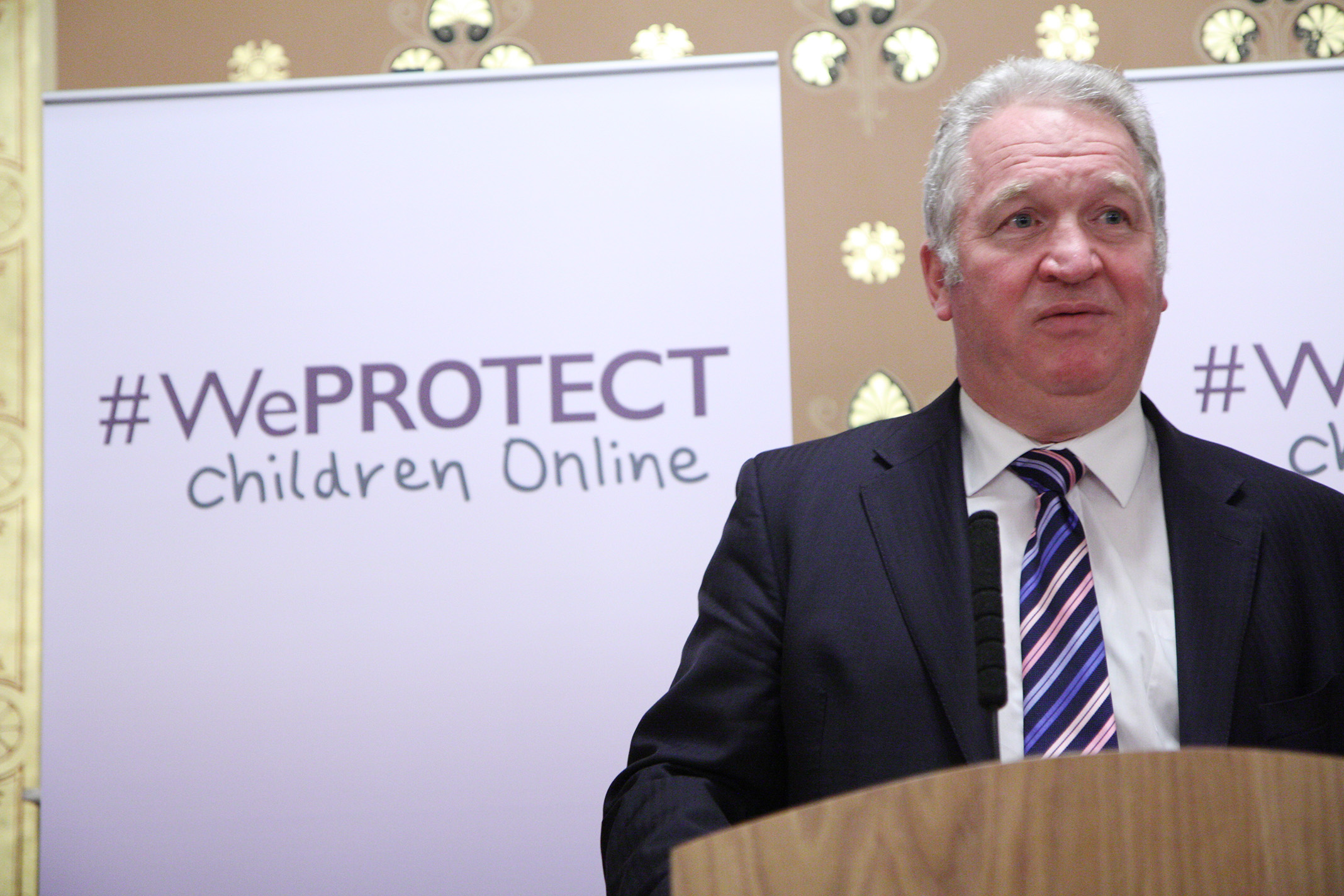
Penning speaks at the #WeProtect Children Online Summit in London on 9 December 2014.

After the 2010 election, Prime Minister David Cameron appointed him a minister of state for transport, with roads and shipping being among his responsibilities. In his capacity as minister for shipping, Penning presented Efthimios Mitropoulos (immediate past-IMO secretary-general) with the insignia of KCMG in Greece on behalf of the Queen. In his role as road safety minister, he suggested that the Dutch could learn about cyclist safety from the British. However, cycling ambassador Roelof Wittink said that although the UK had a lower death toll per head of population, the Dutch use bicycles far more and have one third of the fatalities per mile cycled.

In the reshuffle of 4 September 2012, Penning was moved to become minister of state for Northern Ireland, a position he held for just over a year until being promoted to become minister of state for disabled people on 7 October 2013. He was subsequently promoted a second time on 15 July 2014 to serve as both the minister of state for policing and the minister of state for justice, and was also sworn of the Privy Council. Following the 2017 election, he was sacked as a minister by Prime Minister Theresa May.

== Political positions ==
Penning was a supporter of Brexit during the 2016 referendum.

In May 2021, Penning tabled and was the sole signatory of an early day motion stating as the "UK has left the European Union, the UK should now leave the Eurovision Song Contest, calling on the BBC to no longer spend licence fee money on an event designed to humiliate the UK and notes that, if the winning song is to be broadcast on the public airwaves, it should be preceded by a public health warning."

Penning resigned as vice chairman of the Conservative Party in order to publicly support Penny Mordaunt's campaign in the July 2022 Conservative Party leadership election.

== Personal life ==
Penning lives in Hemel Hempstead with his wife Angela. He employed his wife as his Office Manager on an annual salary up to £40,000. He has two daughters.

He is a supporter of Tottenham Hotspur F.C.

== Honours ==
- General Service Medal with ‘NORTHERN IRELAND’ Clasp
- United Kingdom Privy Counsellor (2014)
- Knight Bachelor (2017)

Parliament of the United Kingdom
Preceded by Tony McWalter	Member of Parliament for Hemel Hempstead; 2005–2024	Succeeded by David Taylor
Political offices
Preceded by Chris Mole	Minister of State for Transport; 2010–2012	Succeeded by Stephen Hammond
Preceded by Hugo Swire	Minister of State for Northern Ireland; 2012–2013	Succeeded by Andrew Robathan
Preceded by Esther McVey	Minister of State for Disabled People; 2013–2014	Succeeded by Mark Harper
Preceded by Damian Green	Minister of State for Policing; 2014–2016	Succeeded by Brandon Lewis
Preceded by Jeremy Wright	Minister of State for Justice; 2014–2016	Succeeded by Oliver Heald
Preceded by Penny Mordaunt	Minister of State for the Armed Forces; 2016–2017	Succeeded by Mark Lancaster
