= 1937 Hemel Hempstead by-election =

UK Parliamentary by-election

← 1935	22 June 1937	1945 →

Constituency of Hemel Hempstead
- Turnout: 55.0% (▼14.3%)
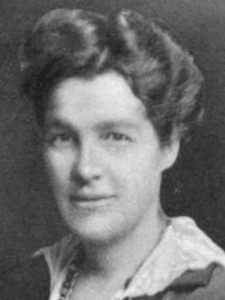
	First party	Second party	Third party
	Con		Lab
Candidate	Frances Davidson	Margery Corbett Ashby	Charles William James
Party	Conservative	Liberal	Labour
Popular vote	14,992	7,347	3,651
Percentage	57.7%	28.3%	14.0%
Swing	▼4.8%	▲6.3%	▼1.4%
MP before election
J. C. C. Davidson
Conservative
Elected MP
Frances Davidson
Conservative

The 1937 Hemel Hempstead by-election was held on 22 June 1937. The by-election was held due to the elevation to the peerage of the incumbent Conservative MP, J. C. C. Davidson. It was won by the Conservative candidate, his wife Frances Davidson, Viscountess Davidson.

== Electoral history ==
General election 1935: Hemel Hempstead
Party	Candidate	Votes	%	±%
Conservative	J. C. C. Davidson	20,074	62.5	−4.7
Liberal	Margery Corbett Ashby	7,078	22.0	−2.6
Labour	Charles William James	4,951	15.4	+7.2
Majority		12,996	40.6	−2.0
Turnout		32,103	69.3	−7.9
Conservative hold		Swing	-1.1	

== Result ==
Hemel Hempstead by-election, 1937
Party	Candidate	Votes	%	±%
Conservative	Frances Davidson, Viscountess Davidson	14,992	57.7	−4.8
Liberal	Margery Corbett Ashby	7,347	28.3	+6.3
Labour	Charles William James	3,651	14.0	−1.4
Majority		7,645	29.4	−11.2
Turnout		25,990	55.0	−14.3
Conservative hold		Swing	-5.6	
