= James Allason =

Soldier and politician (1912–2011)

James Allason OBE

Member of Parliament for Hemel Hempstead
- In office 8 October 1959 – 20 September 1974
- Preceded by: Frances Davidson
- Succeeded by: Robin Corbett

Personal details
- Born: James Harry Allason; 6 September 1912 Kensington, London
- Died: 16 June 2011 (aged 98)
- Party: Conservative
- Relations: Brigadier General Walter Allason (father)

Military service
- Allegiance: United Kingdom
- Branch/service: British Army
- Years of service: 1930–1954
- Rank: Lieutenant Colonel
- Battles/wars: Second World War
- Awards: Officer of the Order of the British Empire

Lieutenant Colonel James Harry Allason, OBE (6 September 1912 – 16 June 2011) was a British Conservative Party politician, sportsman, and former military planner who served as Member of Parliament (MP) for Hemel Hempstead from the 1959 general election until his defeat in the October 1974 general election. He worked in the military with Lord Louis Mountbatten and Winston Churchill. At the time of his death, he was the oldest living former member of the British House of Commons.

== Military career ==
The son of Brigadier General Walter Allason by his wife Katherine Hamilton Poland, daughter of Vice Admiral James Augustus Poland, James Allason was raised primarily by a great-aunt following the death of his mother in 1913 protecting the infant James in a fall down stairs. Allason was a great-grandson of the architect Thomas Allason.

Allason was educated at Haileybury and Imperial Service College and the Royal Military Academy, Woolwich. He served as an officer in the British Army for 24 years from 1930 to 1954, including in India, Ceylon and Burma, rising to the rank of lieutenant colonel. He joined the Royal Artillery in 1932, transferring to the 3rd Carabiniers in 1937. A gifted mathematician, he addressed the problem of using magnetic compasses with tanks: the Allason Sun Compass was adopted for use throughout the Asian theatre.

Allason worked with the Supreme Allied Commander, Admiral Lord Louis Mountbatten, as joint planning staff officer in South East Asia Command and was wounded while commanding tanks during the Burma campaign. He subsequently occupied a similar post as senior military planner at the War Office in London, answering Winston Churchill's queries and providing briefings in the Cabinet War Rooms. His last planning task was to advise on the logistics of withdrawing from Palestine. From 1950 to 1954, he served at the War Office in charge of army discipline.

== Political career ==
After leaving the army Allason worked as a Lloyd's of London insurance broker. He was elected a councillor on Kensington Borough Council in 1956.

Allason contested Hackney Central in 1955. He was Member of Parliament for Hemel Hempstead (after defeating Margaret Thatcher for the Conservative nomination) from 1959 to 1974, when, following boundary changes, he narrowly lost the seat in the October election of that year to Labour's Robin Corbett.

In government Allason was acknowledged for his expertise not only on defence but also in the arcane but key subject of pensions. When the Conservatives were in opposition, Allason was the front-bench spokesman on Housing for six years and is credited with development of the policy of enabling council house tenants to purchase their own properties. That was taken up by Margaret Thatcher and adopted by subsequent Conservative governments, contributing to their electoral victories. After leaving parliament he continued to exercise a rational influence on environmental policy from positions on the executive of the Town and Country Planning Association and the Environment Council's Transport Committee.

After the deaths of Patrick Maitland, 17th Earl of Lauderdale, in December 2008 and Bert Hazell in January 2009, Allason became the oldest living former British Member of Parliament.

== Personal interests ==
As a sportsman Allason raced Bentleys at Brooklands, played polo with maharajahs in India, skied and sailed in international competition, and represented the House of Commons in five sports. He continued skiing until his 87th year, and continued to play Contract Bridge and attend the Opera, on which subjects he wrote.

In 1946, Allason married Nuala (who acted as Nuala McElveen and Nuala Barrie), daughter of John A. McArevey, of Foxrock, Dublin. They had two sons, the younger of whom, the Intelligence historian Rupert Allason, followed him into parliament as Member for Torbay. Julian (1948–2015), the elder son, was a photographer and travel-writer, as well as vice-president of the Anthony Powell Society. The marriage was dissolved in 1974. His wife continued to live at what had been their family home at 15 Cheyne Walk in Chelsea. Allason also lived at Pump Lane House, Bembridge, Isle of Wight.

== Notes ==
Parliament of the United Kingdom
| Preceded by Frances Davidson | Member of Parliament for Hemel Hempstead; 1959–1974 | Succeeded by Robin Corbett |
