= Chelmsford City Racecourse =

Horse racing venue in England

Coordinates: 51°50′27.98″N 0°30′45.25″E

Chelmsford City
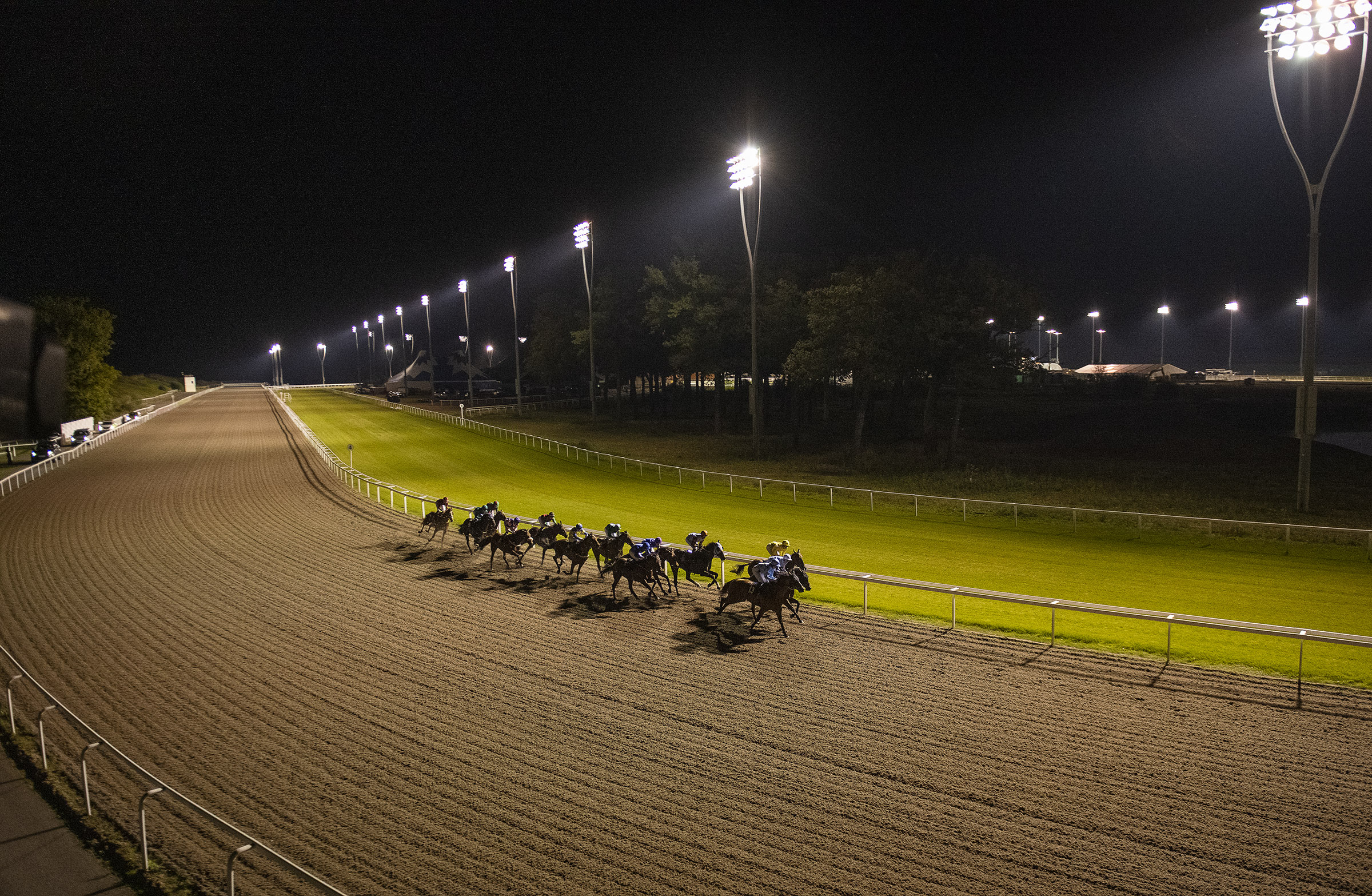
- Horses leaving the back straight
- Interactive map of Chelmsford City
- Location: Great Leighs, Essex
- Owned by: Moulsham Hall Estates Ltd
- Date opened: 20 April 2008 (as Great Leighs); 11 January 2015 (as Chelmsford City); 2 November 2026 (as Chelmsford City)
- Date closed: 16 January 2009 (Great Leighs); 31 March 2026 (Chelmsford City)
- Screened on: Sky Sports Racing
- Course type: Flat Polytrack

Chelmsford City Racecourse, originally known as Great Leighs Racecourse, is a thoroughbred horse racing venue located in Great Leighs near Braintree, Essex, England. When it opened in April 2008, it was the first entirely new racecourse in the UK since Taunton opened in 1927. It went into administration in January 2009, and racing did not resume until January 2015. After further troubles, it closed again in April 2026 but racing resumed in November 2026 after Arena Racing Company completed a multi-year lease to take over running of the course.

Chelmsford City (known as Great Leighs at the time) was developed and owned by entrepreneur John Holmes and his son, Jonathan. It aimed to exploit potentially the largest unserved market in British horse racing. Overall there is slightly more than one racecourse per million people in Great Britain, but there was no racecourse in Essex (population >1.6 million), in east London (formerly in part, part of Essex) or in the neighbouring county of Hertfordshire (population >1 million). The course is only 50 miles (80 kilometres) from Newmarket, the largest racehorse training centre in Britain. The course is laid out as an 8.5-furlong (1,700-metre) left-handed Polytrack oval, with a 2-furlong (400-metre) home straight.

== History ==
=== Opening ===
Great Leighs racecourse was originally scheduled to open in October 2006, but the opening was deferred several times. On 20 March 2008, the racecourse announced that the opening fixture would be postponed to 20 April 2008, with the original opening date, 4 April 2008, being used a test day.

Eventually, on 20 April 2008, the racecourse staged its first race meeting before an invited audience, with the opening race being won by Temple of Thebes. The first meeting with full public admission took place on 28 May 2008. The venue attracted some praise for some of its racing facilities but considerable criticism for the incomplete state of its visitor facilities. Attendances failed to meet expectations. The 10,000-capacity grandstand was used at the 2006 Ryder Cup.

=== First closure ===
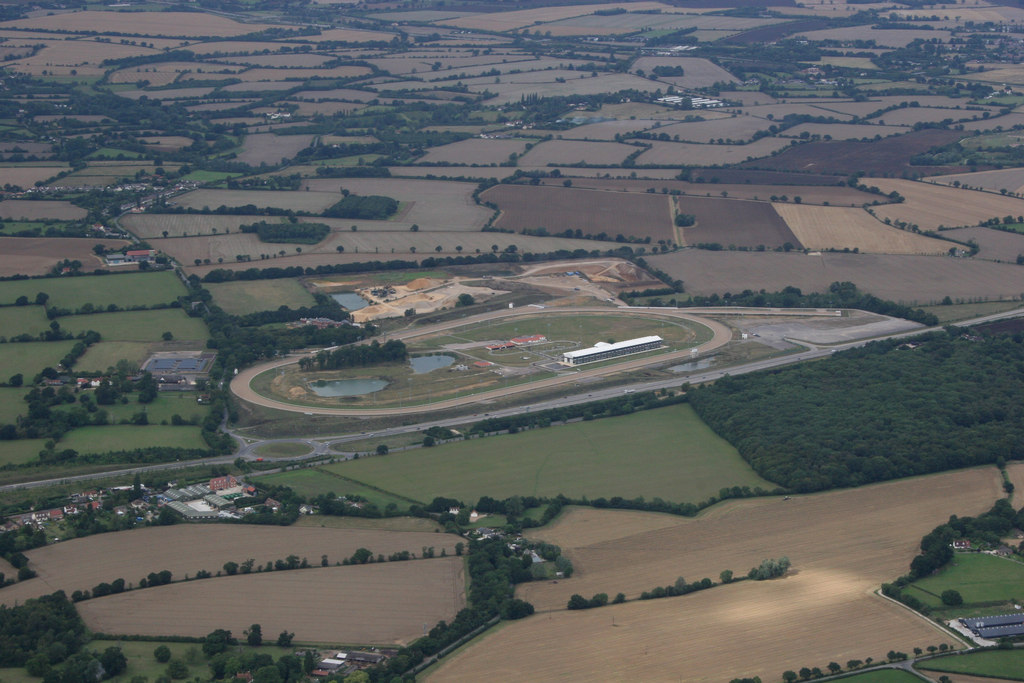
The racecourse in its Great Leighs days

The course was placed into administration and its temporary racing licence revoked on 16 January 2009. In March 2009, the administrators announced that the two parties that had made bids for the course had failed to demonstrate that they had sufficient financial backing. The administrators stated that they would enter into negotiations with the main creditor, the Royal Bank of Scotland, to see whether it was willing to take ownership of the course, and contract out the management of its operations to an established racecourse operator.

The administrators subsequently made a deal with a local businessman, Terry Chambers, to lease the course to him for 18 months, but the course was unable to obtain a racing licence and was, therefore, ineligible to bid for fixtures for 2010. In September 2009, the administrators announced that they had struck a deal for Chambers and Bill Gredley to buy the racecourse with the hope that racing could resume in 2011, but the deal fell through. In June 2010 the administrators announced that they had given up hope of selling the business as a going concern and had started discussions with the Royal Bank of Scotland to find an alternative use for the site.

In March 2011 it was reported that Andrew Tinkler, chief executive of Eddie Stobart Ltd, was in discussions with Royal Bank of Scotland about reopening the track as a racecourse.

The course was bought by MC Racetracks in November 2011, but in May 2012 the British Horseracing Authority (BHA) rejected a bid to host fixtures at Great Leighs in 2013 but said that the owners were "welcome to submit an application to be part of the 2014 fixture list". In January 2013 MC Racetracks announced that they would submit an application to the BHA to hold racing at the course in 2014 but in June 2013, the BHA announced that it had rejected the application for 2014 fixtures.

Late in 2013, it was reported that a syndicate headed by Betfred's proprietor, Fred Done, had bought the track and was, as 'Chelmsford City Racecourse', to seek BHA approval for 2015 fixtures. In April 2014, the BHA announced that Great Leighs could apply to host fixtures in 2015 but without a guarantee of an expansion of all-weather fixtures.

The BHA announced, in July 2014, that the course would be allocated 12 fixtures for racing in 2015, a figure subsequently increased to 58 meetings when the 2015 fixture list was published. The BHA announced that the course would stage its reopening meeting on 11 January 2015.

=== Reopening ===
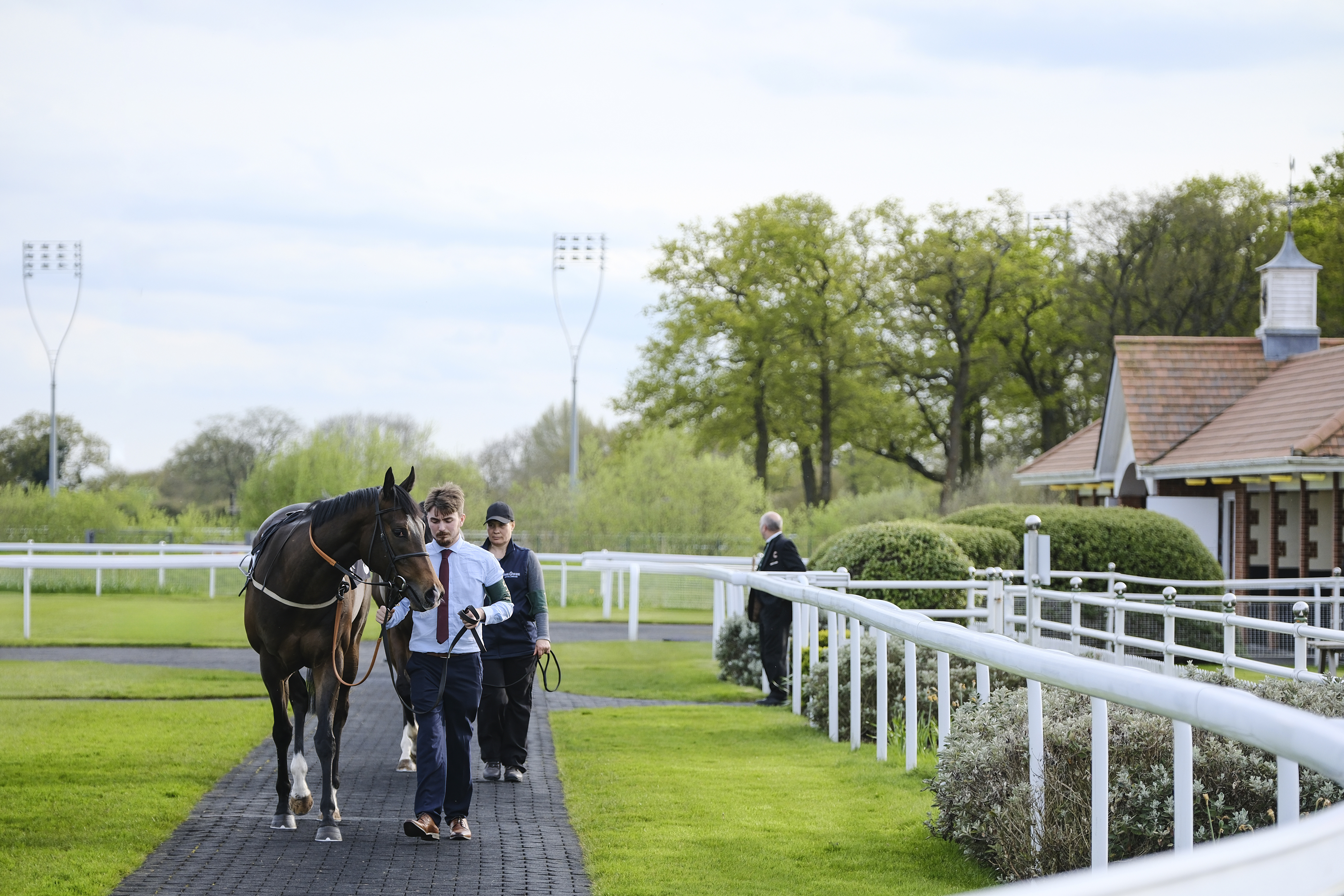
The parade ring

The course reopened for racing on 11 January 2015, with an invited crowd of 800 people present, with the full public reopening taking place on 22 January 2015. The first race was won by a short head by Tryster, trained by Charlie Appleby. On 27 December 2015, racing from Chelmsford City appeared on Channel 4 Racing for the first time following waterlogging at Chepstow and the abandonment of the Welsh Grand National. In January 2017 Chelmsford City announced plans to build a casino and develop a new turf course inside the existing all-weather track.

Chelmsford City Racecourse’s first Listed race which was created in 2018. The Queen Charlotte Fillies' Stakes, open to fillies and mares aged four years or older is run over a distance of 7 furlongs and was the UK's most valuable Listed race in 2022 and 2023 with a value of £100,000.

A second Listed race was created in 2019, the Chelmer Fillies' Stakes, open to fillies aged three years. It is run over a distance of 6 furlongs in late April or early May.

In addition to these Listed races, the Cardinal Stakes over a distance of 1 mile and open to three-year-old horses is a feature. The race was run for the first time in 2019 as the finale of seven races in the European Road to the Kentucky Derby series and carrying a purse of £100,000 as well as earning points and the chance to qualify for the Kentucky Derby. The race was removed from the Kentucky Derby qualification series in 2025.

=== Further troubles ===
Chelmsford had long planned to race on a turf track inside the all-weather circuit, which the British Horseracing Authority (BHA) approved in May 2018, yet racing has never taken place on the turf course. Running races on turf (likely with mixed meetings with the all-weather) were once again mooted for a beginning in 2022 and impressive plans were approved in 2023 for a new grandstand with bars, restaurants and a rooftop terrace but both have so far come to nothing.

The racecourse has regularly criticised the BHA for its fixture allocation, believing it should receive more. It described the BHA in December 2023 as allocating their fixtures in an 'anti-competitive and unlawful' manner and threatened a legal challenge.

In November 2024, a race had to be voided after the starting stalls were not removed in time before the runners completed a circuit due to a failure with the tractor. All horses were pulled-up in time and none of the nine runners or riders were harmed.

A Justin Timberlake concert in July 2025 saw four-hour queues of cars aiming to leave the event, which had had 25,000 in attendance. Some people walked out of the event, putting themselves at risk, whilst the racecourse was overwhelmed with complaints. Chelmsford City Council ruled that there had been a 'catastrophic failure' in management and declared that the racecourse's capacity for music events would be reduced from 29,999 to 10,000.

Financial woes resurfaced at the end of 2025, when on New Year's Eve the roughly forty staff were only paid 80% of their wages for December due to circumstances the racecourse described as 'beyond our control'. The issue would be resolved. The racecourse filed to appoint administrators the following February (the same month that a court action with the promoters of the Justin Timberlake concert was settled) in what the racecourse described as part of a restructuring process its tenant (Great Leighs Estates Ltd) was undergoing, and it reassured those concerned that racing would 'continue as normal' and be unaffected by the situation. Great Leighs Estates Ltd (GLEL) entered administration in March, which led to the meeting scheduled for 26 March requiring special dispensation from the BHA in order to take place whilst they tried to license a new company (Golden Mile Racing Ltd) to take over at Chelmsford City.

=== Second closure and Arena Racing Company rescue ===
The racecourse would see its fixtures cancelled for the foreseeable future with its licence to host fixtures revoked on 31 March 2026 (made public the following day), with the BHA saying that it 'did not consider it appropriate' to license Golden Mile Racing Ltd (GMRL) to operate the venue, whilst keeping its reasoning for this confidential. There was much anger from trainers over the timing of the announcement as declarations had already been made for meetings at course on the next two days, which were now cancelled (although two races which were due to take place on the Good Friday meeting were rescheduled). GMRL were given twenty-one days to appeal the decision. It is believed that the racecourse did ask other organisations, including the Jockey Club, whether they would run the racecourse in the interim, but no deal was struck in time. Another three fixtures would be transferred to Southwell on 15 April.

On 26 June, the BHA rejected an appeal from GMRL, believing it was insufficiently independent of John Holmes (the former GLEL director who was found to have misled the BHA over its finances) and questioning its ability to fund its twelve fixtures for the year. It was determined by administrators that GLEL owed £22.2 million to a variety of creditors and that it could not be rescued as a going concern, yet the debt was later found to be around £30M. Meetings into July and August (including the Queen Charlotte Fillies' Stakes meeting) were cancelled and moved to other racecourses. The racecourse's position in the 2027 fixture list was also put under question.

On 24 July, it was announced that the Arena Racing Company (Arc) had reached an agreement to take over running of the course and resume racing 'at the earliest available opportunity'. On 5 October, Arc completed a multi-year lease to take over running of the racecourse and announced that they expected racing to recommence on 2 November. They also began to oversee non-racing events at the course which had continued in the closure period, and the move meant that TV coverage of races was transferred from Racing TV to Sky Sports Racing. The course's administrators sold 12 of Chelmsford City's 16 fixtures to the Jockey Club on 13 October. The BHA granted Arc a licence to race on 23 October and racing resumed on 2 November, although bookmakers Ladbrokes and Coral refused to take bets at the meeting due to a dispute with Arc.

== Course characteristics ==
Chelmsford is a galloping, left-handed oval of just over a mile in circumference, with two sweeping bends. There are two chutes, one for seven-furlong races and one for one-mile and two-mile races, but there is no straight course. The surface is Polytrack, a synthetic surface also used at Kempton and Lingfield. Many say that there is a strong pace bias favouring front-runners.

== Notable races ==
Month	DOW	Race Name	Type	Grade	Distance	Age/Sex
April	Thursday	Cardinal Stakes	Flat	Conditions	1m	3yo
May	Thursday	Chelmer Fillies' Stakes	Flat	Listed	6f	3yo f
June	Sunday	Queen Charlotte Fillies' Stakes	Flat	Listed	7f	4yo+ f

== See also ==
- Horse racing in Great Britain
