= 1920 Hemel Hempstead by-election =

UK Parliamentary by-election

The 1920 Hemel Hempstead by-election was held on 9 November 1920. The by-election was held due to the death of the incumbent Coalition Conservative MP, Gustavus Talbot. It was won by the Coalition Conservative candidate J. C. C. Davidson, who was elected unopposed.

Hemel Hempstead by-election, 1920
Party		Candidate	Votes	%	±%
C	Unionist	J. C. C. Davidson	Unopposed		
	Unionist hold				
C indicates candidate endorsed by the coalition government.
