= Robin Corbett =

British politician (1933–2012)

The Right Honourable The Lord Corbett of Castle Vale

Member of the House of Lords
- Lord Temporal
- Life peerage 5 July 2001 – 19 February 2012

Member of Parliament for Birmingham Erdington
- In office 9 June 1983 – 14 May 2001
- Preceded by: Julius Silverman
- Succeeded by: Siôn Simon

Member of Parliament for Hemel Hempstead
- In office 10 October 1974 – 7 April 1979
- Preceded by: James Allason
- Succeeded by: Nicholas Lyell

Personal details
- Born: 22 December 1933 Fremantle, Western Australia, Australia
- Died: 19 February 2012 (aged 78) Hemel Hempstead, Hertfordshire, England
- Party: Labour
- Spouse(s): Val Hudson (m. 1970) (now The Lady Corbett)
- Children: 3

Robin Corbett, Baron Corbett of Castle Vale (22 December 1933 – 19 February 2012) was a British Labour Party politician and journalist.

Corbett sat in the House of Commons from 1974 to 1979 and then from 1983 to 2001, before being elevated to the House of Lords as a Life Peer.

== Early life ==
Corbett was born in Fremantle, Western Australia, to Marguerite Adele (née Mainwaring) and Thomas William Corbett. His parents had recently moved to Australia from England. His father, working in a foundry and being a mechanical engineer, was a fervent union supporter. His active participation in some protests led to his and his family's deportation back to England in 1935.They resettled in West Bromwich, and Corbett attended Holly Lodge Grammar School in Smethwick, leaving at the age of sixteen. He was called up for two years' national service in the Royal Air Force in 1951. After completing his national service he became a journalist, first for the Birmingham Evening Mail and then for the Daily Mirror. In 1968 he became deputy editor of Farmer's Weekly, then worked for IPC Magazines in 1970, where he stayed until his election to parliament in 1974.

== Parliamentary career ==
Corbett first stood for Parliament at Hemel Hempstead in 1966, and then in a 1967 by-election at West Derbyshire, but was unsuccessful at both attempts.

He was elected Labour member of parliament (MP) for Hemel Hempstead at the October 1974 general election, but he lost the seat at the general election in 1979. He then returned to IPC Magazines, working as a communications consultant until he returned to parliament in the 1983 general election, representing Birmingham Erdington. He held this seat until retiring from the House of Commons at the 2001 general election, when Siôn Simon succeeded him as Labour Member of Parliament for Birmingham Erdington.

In the House of Commons, Corbett served as Opposition Spokesman for Home Affairs (1979–1992), then for National Heritage, Broadcasting and Press until 1995. He was a Labour Party Whip from 1984 until 1987, and Chairman of the Home Affairs Select Committee from 1999 to 2001. His Private Member's Bill, still law today, granted lifetime anonymity for rape victims in court and media.

== House of Lords ==
Created a Life Peer as Baron Corbett of Castle Vale, of Erdington in the County of West Midlands, on 5 July 2001, his political interests included Home Office, police, civil liberties, the motor industry, manufacturing, disability, children's rights, alternative energy, environment, agriculture, animal welfare, and the press and broadcasting. He was Chairman of the All Party Penal Affairs Group, a parliamentary organisation clerked by the Prison Reform Trust, and a Patron of the Forum on Prisoner Education and UNLOCK, The National Association of Ex-Offenders. He was chairman of the all-party British Parliamentary Committee for Iran Freedom and Chairman of Friends of Cyprus.

Lord Corbett was a vice-president of the Debating Group.

== Family ==
Married to Val Hudson in 1970, they had one daughter, Polly Corbett writing as Polly Hudson, writes for The Guardian among other newspapers and magazines'.

== Death ==
Corbett died of lung cancer at his home in Hemel Hempstead on 19 February 2012, aged 78.

== Robin Corbett Award ==
Following Corbett's death in February 2012 and his lifelong interest in prisoners 'learning through doing', his family established a lasting memorial to his work in penal reform. The Robin Corbett Award for Prisoner Rehabilitation was launched in 2013 with the Prison Reform Trust as prisoner rehabilitation legacy. In 2017 The Corbett Network for Prisoner Reingration was created.

The Robin Corbett Award funds £10,000 annually to three charities who do the most for prisoner reintegration. The presentation takes place at the House of Lords. Unless ex-offenders are steered in the right direction after release, around 50% will re-offend within two years – that figure plummets to 19% when they have a job. Yet only 12% of firms employ people with criminal convictions who have served their time and need to change direction. www.robincorbettaward.co.uk The Corbett Network, a coalition of over 90 decision-makers of charities, social enterprises and organisations involved in reintegration working together to persuade more firms to hire returning citizens. Members also offer mentoring, training or education.

Parliament of the United Kingdom
Preceded by James Harry Allason	Member of Parliament for Hemel Hempstead; Oct 1974–1979	Succeeded by Nicholas Lyell
Preceded by Julius Silverman	Member of Parliament for Birmingham Erdington; 1983–2001	Succeeded by Siôn Simon
