= Walter Allason =

British army officer and diver (1875–1960)

Brigadier-General Walter Allason DSO*
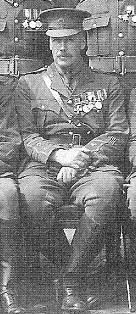
- Allason in 1922
- Born: 25 October 1875; Paddington, London, England
- Died: 11 January 1960 (aged 84); London, England
- Education: Royal Military College, Sandhurst
- Spouse: Katharine Hamilton Poland (m. 1908; died 1913)
- Children: James Allason; Dolores Celina Allason
- Relatives: Thomas Allason (grandfather)
- Military career
- Allegiance: United Kingdom
- Branch: British Army
- Service years: 1894–1925
- Rank: Brigadier-General
- Units: Manchester Regiment; Bedfordshire Regiment
- Commands: 52nd Brigade (1918–1925); 1st Battalion, Bedfordshire Regiment (1914–1918)
- Conflicts: Second Boer War; First World War
- Awards: Companion of the Distinguished Service Order & Bar

Brigadier-General Walter Allason, DSO & Bar (25 October 1875 – 11 January 1960) was an English swimmer, diver, and a senior officer of the British Army who distinguished himself in battle during the First World War.

== Early life and career ==
Walter Allason was born in Paddington in London on 25 October 1875, the son of Elizabeth Thomazine née Allen (1844–1925) and Alfred Allason (1840–1890), a retired officer of the Royal Marines. He was the grandson of the architect Thomas Allason. The 1891 Census records Walter Allason as a scholar at Bourne Hill School and reading for the Army Exam. He passed out of the Royal Military College at Sandhurst as a gentleman cadet, following which he was commissioned as a second lieutenant in the 4th (Reserve) Battalion, Manchester Regiment on 23 July 1894, and was promoted to lieutenant in 1896. He was transferred to the Bedfordshire Regiment as a second lieutenant on 9 December 1896 and was promoted back to lieutenant on 1 July 1898.

After service in the Second Boer War, Allason was seconded for service in the Foreign Office in 1902. He was promoted to major in October 1913 and was appointed second-in-command of the 1st Battalion, Bedfordshire Regiment, when it was posted to France on 16 August 1914, at the start of the First World War.

Allason was wounded in action and in 1915 was appointed a Companion of the Distinguished Service Order (DSO). He was wounded again on Hill 60 in April 1915 and after his recovery he was appointed to command the 8th (Service) Battalion, Bedfordshire Regiment, but rejoined the 1st Battalion for the Battle of the Somme in 1916. He was awarded a Bar to his DSO for the Somme, possibly as a result of the battalion's attack on Falfemont Farm in September 1916. The citation for the Bar reads:

Maj. (temp. Lt.-Col.) Walter Allason, D.S.O., Bedf. R. For conspicuous gallantry in action. He executed an attack with the greatest initiative and resource, thereby enabling a strong enemy position to be captured. He handled his battalion with great skill throughout the operations.

Allason was wounded for a third time in December 1916 when, inspecting the trenches at the front line, he was accidentally shot by a young and jumpy subaltern. The wound was serious enough for Allason to be removed from duty, only able to return to the command of the 1st Battalion after the war. In 1918, Allason was promoted to temporary brigadier general in April 1918 and was appointed to command the 52nd Infantry Brigade, part of the 17th (Northern) Division, taking over from Brigadier General Archibald James Fergusson Eden after he was wounded, and commanding it until after the war ended due to the Armistice with Germany.

Allason, promoted in January 1919 to brevet lieutenant colonel, was promoted to brigadier general and placed on the retired list on 25 October 1925 when he reached 50 years of age, the compulsory retirement age for officers.

== Personal life ==
On 18 August 1908, Captain Allason married Katharine Hamilton Poland (1885–1913), the daughter of the retired Vice Admiral James Augustus Poland. In 1911 he, his wife and daughter Dolores Celina Allason (1909–1993) were living at The Glen in Upper Hale in Farnham in Surrey. His son, James Allason (1912–2011) was raised primarily by a great-aunt, following the death of his mother in 1913, who was protecting the infant James in a fall down some stairs. James went on to become a British Conservative Party politician, sportsman, and a lieutenant colonel, who worked with The Earl Mountbatten and Winston Churchill.

=== Diving ===
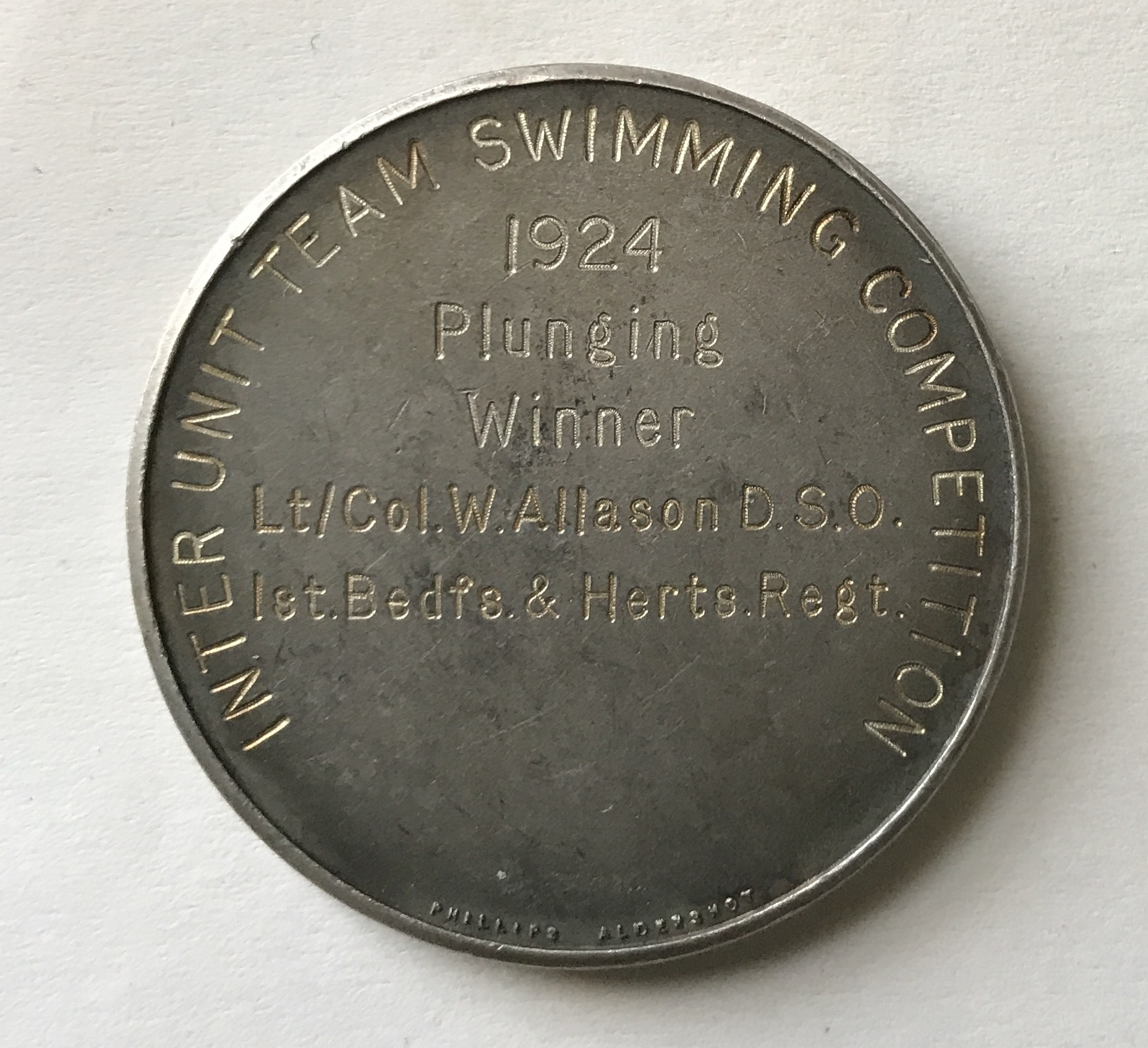
Diving medal awarded to Allason at Aldershot in 1924

In 1896, 1897, 1902, 1908, 1909 and 1922, Allason won the English Plunging (diving) Championship and the Aldershot Command Officers' Challenge Cup in 1912. In 1924, as a lieutenant colonel, he won a first place medal in the Plunging category in the Inter Unit Team Swimming Competition at Aldershot Command.

=== After retirement ===
In 1939, listed as a widower, Allason was living at Brackley in Northamptonshire with his daughter. At that time he was the Area Chief Warden in the Air Raid Precautions (ARP), while his daughter was attached to a Voluntary Aid Detachment (VAD) in a Mobile Unit.

His book Military Mapping and Reports was published in 1940 by Duckworth Books, and went through six editions by the time of his death.

Brigadier General Walter Allason died in London in January 1960, at the age of 84.
