= John Freeman Dunn =

English banker, stockbroker, barrister and Liberal Party politician

John Freeman Dunn (12 April 1874 – 7 December 1954) was an English banker and stockbroker, barrister and Liberal Party politician.

== Family and education ==
Dunn was born in Basingstoke in Hampshire the son of George Freeman Dunn. He was educated at Queen Mary's School, Basingstoke. In 1914 he married Constance Henderson of Hove in East Sussex. They had a son and a daughter.

== Career ==
Dunn was for fifteen years the Manager of the Brighton and Hove Branches of the Midland Bank, Ltd. He was an Associate of the Institute of Bankers of which he was Gilbart Prizeman and became a partner in the firm of David A. Bevan Simpson & Co., stockbrokers, 37 Threadneedle Street in the City of London. He was a member of the London Stock Exchange. He was also a Director of the British American Trading Co., Ltd a merchant banking and Investment Company. In 1909, he was called to the bar at Gray's Inn.

== Politics ==
=== Hemel Hempstead ===
Dunn first stood for Parliament at the 1923 general election when he was selected as Liberal candidate for the Hertfordshire seat of Hemel Hempstead. In a good year for the Liberal Party, reunited after the splits of the Lloyd George and Asquith rivalries, Dunn defeated the sitting Conservative MP, J C C Davidson, in a nail-bitingly close straight fight by the margin of 17 votes. At the 1924 general election, the Tory Party had recovered its position and with Labour also standing a candidate, Davidson regained his seat with a majority of nearly 5,000.

=== Faversham by-election ===
Dunn got a chance to re-enter the House of Commons in January 1928 when he was selected as Liberal candidate in a by-election at Faversham in Kent, following the death of the sitting Conservative MP, Sir Granville Wheler. In a four cornered contest with Conservative, Labour and Independent Conservative opponents, Dunn came third with 18.6% of the poll.

=== Chichester ===
Dunn tried once more for Parliament, this time at Chichester in West Sussex at the 1929 general election. However, in a straight fight with the Tories the sitting MP, John Sewell Courtauld, held the seat comfortably with a majority of 8,880 votes.

== Royal Commercial Travellers Schools ==
Dunn was for twenty years Chairman of the Royal Commercial Travellers Schools, founded in 1845 by John Robert Cuffley, first in Wanstead, later moving to Pinner in Middlesex. The schools were founded with the aim of housing, feeding, clothing and educating the necessitous children of brethren "on the road" who met untimely death or became unable to earn their livelihood. The schools closed in 1967 but The Royal Pinner School Foundation succeeded the Schools to provide assistance in the education of children of commercial travellers, sales and technical representatives and manufacturers' agents where need can be shown.

== Death ==
Dunn died at his home, Hazards, Enton, Godalming, Surrey on 7 December 1954, aged 80 years.

Parliament of the United Kingdom
Preceded by J C C Davidson	Member of Parliament for Hemel Hempstead; 1923 – 1924	Succeeded by J C C Davidson
