= Viscount Davidson =

Title in the Peerage of the United Kingdom

Viscount Davidson, of Little Gaddesden in the County of Hertford, is a title in the Peerage of the United Kingdom. It was created on 11 June 1937 for the Conservative politician and former Member of Parliament for Hemel Hempstead, Sir J. C. C. Davidson.

His elder son Andrew, the second Viscount, served as Captain of the Yeomen of the Guard from 1986 to 1991 in the Conservative administrations of Margaret Thatcher and John Major. However, he lost his seat in the House of Lords after the passing of the House of Lords Act 1999. Andrew died in 2012 and the title was inherited by his brother Malcolm. Malcolm died in 2019 and the title was inherited by Malcolm's son John.

== Viscounts Davidson (1937) ==
- John Colin Campbell Davidson, 1st Viscount Davidson (1889–1970)
- (John) Andrew Davidson, 2nd Viscount Davidson (1928–2012)
- Malcolm William Mackenzie Davidson, 3rd Viscount Davidson (1934–2019)
- (John) Nicolas Alexander Davidson, 4th Viscount Davidson (born 1971)

There is no heir to the viscountcy.

Coat of arms of Viscount Davidson
Crest A lion passant Gules charged on the shoulder with a pheon Or and holding in the dexter paw a torch inflamed Proper. Escutcheon Argent on a fess Sable between in chief two pheons Azure and in base a boar’s head erased of the second a portcullis chained Or. Supporters On the dexter side a horse Argent charged on the shoulder with a rose Gules barbed and seeded Proper and on the sinister side a horse Sable charged on the shoulder with a martlet Or. Motto Lux Ex Tenebris
