= Hemel Hempstead (constituency) =

UK Parliament constituency (1918–1983, 1997 onwards)

- County constituency for the House of Commons
- Interactive map of boundaries since 2024
- Location within the East of England
- County: Hertfordshire
- Electorate: 70,496 (March 2020)
- Major settlements: Hemel Hempstead

Current constituency
- Created: 1997
- Member of Parliament: David Taylor (Labour)
- Seats: One
- Created from: West Hertfordshire

1918–1983
- Seats: One
- Type of constituency: County constituency
- Created from: Watford and St Albans
- Replaced by: West Hertfordshire and South West Hertfordshire

Hemel Hempstead is a constituency in Hertfordshire represented in the House of Commons of the Parliament of the United Kingdom. It elects one Member of Parliament (MP) by the first-past-the-post system. Since 2024, it has been represented by David Taylor of the Labour Party.

== Constituency profile ==
Hemel Hempstead is a constituency located in Hertfordshire within the borough of Dacorum. It covers the large town of Hemel Hempstead, which has a population of around 100,000, and the outlying village of Bovingdon. Hemel Hempstead was traditionally an agricultural market town but was greatly expanded after being designated as a new town in 1947. This earmarked the town for development to accommodate overspill from London, which is located around 24 miles (39 km) south-east of Hemel Hempstead. The constituency has average levels of wealth; there is some deprivation in the neighbourhood of Highfield whilst the rural and outer suburban areas are affluent. House prices are higher than the national and East of England averages.

Residents of Hemel Hempstead have average levels of education, income and professional employment. White people made up 83% of the population at the 2021 census, identical to the nationwide proportion. Asians were the largest ethnic minority group at 8%. At the borough council, the town's central neighbourhoods are represented mostly by Liberal Democrats with some Labour Party councillors, whilst the outer suburbs and rural areas elected Conservatives. At the county council, which held elections more recently, Reform UK gained representation in the town's outer suburbs. An estimated 56% of voters in Hemel Hempstead supported leaving the European Union in the 2016 referendum, higher than the nationwide figure of 52%.

== History ==
The constituency was established as a Division of Hertfordshire by the Representation of the People Act 1918, largely created from the northern half of the Watford Division, including Hemel Hempstead, Berkhamsted and Tring. It also included north-western part of the St Albans Division, around Harpenden.

Harpenden was transferred back to St Albans in 1974 and the constituency was temporarily abolished from 1983 to 1997 during which time it was replaced by West Hertfordshire.

== Boundaries and boundary changes ==
=== History ===
==== 1918–1950 ====
- The Municipal Borough of Hemel Hempstead;
- The Urban Districts of Berkhamsted, Harpenden, and Tring;
- The Rural Districts of Berkhamsted and Hemel Hempstead;
- The Rural District of St Albans parishes of Harpenden Rural, Redbourn, and Wheathampstead; and
- The Rural District of Watford parishes of Abbots Langley and Sarratt.

==== 1950–1974 ====
- The Municipal Borough of Hemel Hempstead
- The Urban Districts of Berkhamsted, Harpenden, and Tring;
- The Rural Districts of Berkhamsted and Hemel Hempstead; and
- The Rural District of St Albans parishes of Harpenden Rural and Redbourn.

Wheathampstead was transferred back to St Albans. Abbots Langley and Sarratt now included in the new constituency of South West Hertfordshire.

==== 1974–1983 ====
- The Municipal Borough of Hemel Hempstead;
- The Urban Districts of Berkhamsted and Tring; and
- The Rural Districts of Berkhamsted and Hemel Hempstead.

Harpenden and the part of the parishes of Harpenden Rural and Redbourn were transferred back to St Albans.

The constituency was abolished for the 1983 general election. Berkhamsted and the area to the south of Hemel Hempstead, including Kings Langley, was transferred to South West Hertfordshire. The remainder, including Hemel Hempstead and Tring, formed the new constituency of West Hertfordshire.

==== 1997–2010 ====
- The District of Dacorum wards of Adeyfield East, Adeyfield West, Ashridge, Bennetts End, Boxmoor, Central, Chaulden, Crabtree, Cupid Green, Flamstead and Markyate, Gadebridge, Grove Hill, Highfield, Kings Langley, Leverstock Green, Nash Mills, South, and Warners End.

Re-established for the 1997 general election from the bulk of the abolished County Constituency of West Hertfordshire (excluding Tring). Kings Langley transferred back from South West Hertfordshire.

Map of boundaries 2010–2024

==== 2010–2024 ====
- The District of Dacorum wards of Adeyfield East, Adeyfield West, Apsley, Ashridge, Bennetts End, Boxmoor, Chaulden and Shrubhill, Corner Hall, Gadebridge, Grove Hill, Hemel Hempstead Central, Highfield and St Paul's, Kings Langley, Leverstock Green, Nash Mills, Warners End, Watling, and Woodhall.

Minor loss to South West Hertfordshire following revision of local authority wards.

=== Current ===
Further to the 2023 review of Westminster constituencies, which came into effect for the 2024 general election, the composition of the constituency is as follows (as they existed on 1 December 2020):

- The District of Dacorum wards of: Adeyfield East; Adeyfield West; Apsley and Corner Hall; Bennetts End; Bovingdon, Flaunden and Chipperfield; Boxmoor; Chaulden and Warners End; Gadebridge; Grovehill; Hemel Hempstead Town; Highfield; Leverstock Green; Nash Mills; Woodhall Farm.

Moderate changes, with Kings Langley being transferred to South West Hertfordshire, in exchange for the rural Bovingdon, Flaunden and Chipperfield ward. The rural Ashridge and Watling wards to the north were moved to the newly created seat of Harpenden and Berkhamsted.

== Members of Parliament ==
=== MPs, 1918–1983 ===
Watford and St Albans prior to 1918

| Election | Member | Party |
|---|---|---|
| 1918 | Gustavus Talbot | Coalition Conservative |
| 1920 | JCC Davidson | Coalition Conservative |
| 1923 | John Freeman Dunn | Liberal |
| 1924 | JCC Davidson | Conservative |
| 1937 by-election | Viscountess Davidson | Conservative |
| 1959 | James Allason | Conservative |
| October 1974 | Robin Corbett | Labour |
| 1979 | Nicholas Lyell | Conservative |

=== MPs, 1997–present ===
West Hertfordshire prior to 1997

| Election | Member | Party |
|---|---|---|
| 1997 | Tony McWalter | Labour Co-operative |
| 2005 | Sir Mike Penning | Conservative |
| 2024 | David Taylor | Labour |

== Election results since 1997 ==
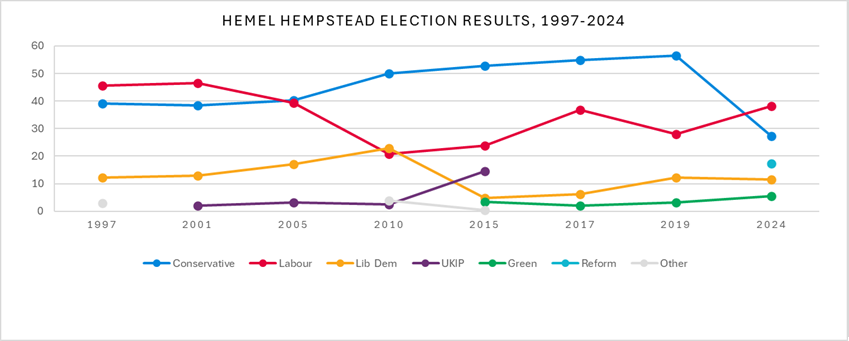
Hemel Hempstead election results 1983–2024

=== Elections in the 2020s ===
General election 2024: Hemel Hempstead
| Party | Candidate | Votes | % | ±% |
|---|---|---|---|---|
| Labour | David Taylor | 16,844 | 38.2 | +10.1 |
| Conservative | Andrew Williams | 11,987 | 27.2 | −27.8 |
| Reform | Noel Willcox | 7,689 | 17.4 | New |
| Liberal Democrats | Sammy Barry-Mears | 5,096 | 11.6 | +0.2 |
| Green | Sherief Hassan | 2,492 | 5.6 | +2.7 |
| Majority | | 4,857 | 11.0 | N/A |
| Turnout | | 44,108 | 62.1 | −7.5 |
| Registered electors | | 71,038 | | |
| Labour gain from Conservative | | Swing | +18.9 | |

- Jaymey McIvor was originally selected as the Conservative candidate, but was suspended by the party "pending the outcome of an investigation."

=== Elections in the 2010s ===
2019 notional result
| Party | Vote | % |
|---|---|---|
| Conservative | 26,963 | 55.0 |
| Labour | 13,802 | 28.1 |
| Liberal Democrats | 5,569 | 11.4 |
| Green | 1,432 | 2.9 |
| Others | 1,299 | 2.6 |
| Turnout | 49,065 | 69.6 |
| Electorate | 70,496 | |

General election 2019: Hemel Hempstead
| Party | Candidate | Votes | % | ±% |
|---|---|---|---|---|
| Conservative | Mike Penning | 28,968 | 56.5 | +1.5 |
| Labour | Nabila Ahmed | 14,405 | 28.1 | −8.8 |
| Liberal Democrats | Sammy Barry | 6,317 | 12.3 | +6.1 |
| Green | Sherief Hassan | 1,581 | 3.1 | +1.1 |
| Majority | | 14,563 | 28.4 | +10.3 |
| Turnout | | 51,271 | 69.5 | −0.2 |
| Registered electors | | 73,737 | | |
| Conservative hold | | Swing | +5.2 | |

General election 2017: Hemel Hempstead
| Party | Candidate | Votes | % | ±% |
|---|---|---|---|---|
| Conservative | Mike Penning | 28,735 | 55.0 | +2.1 |
| Labour | Mandi Tattershall | 19,290 | 36.9 | +13.1 |
| Liberal Democrats | Sally Symington | 3,233 | 6.2 | +1.3 |
| Green | Sherief Hassan | 1,024 | 2.0 | −1.4 |
| Majority | | 9,445 | 18.1 | −11.0 |
| Turnout | | 52,282 | 69.7 | +3.2 |
| Registered electors | | 75,011 | | |
| Conservative hold | | Swing | −5.5 | |

General election 2015: Hemel Hempstead
| Party | Candidate | Votes | % | ±% |
|---|---|---|---|---|
| Conservative | Mike Penning | 26,245 | 52.9 | +2.9 |
| Labour | Tony Breslin | 11,825 | 23.8 | +3.0 |
| UKIP | Howard Koch | 7,249 | 14.6 | +12.1 |
| Liberal Democrats | Rabi Martins | 2,402 | 4.8 | −18.1 |
| Green | Alan Borgars | 1,660 | 3.3 | New |
| Independent | Brian Hall | 252 | 0.5 | New |
| Majority | | 14,420 | 29.1 | +2.0 |
| Turnout | | 49,633 | 66.5 | −1.5 |
| Registered electors | | 74,616 | | |
| Conservative hold | | Swing | −0.1 | |

General election 2010: Hemel Hempstead
| Party | Candidate | Votes | % | ±% |
|---|---|---|---|---|
| Conservative | Mike Penning | 24,721 | 50.0 | +9.8 |
| Liberal Democrats | Richard Grayson | 11,315 | 22.9 | +5.9 |
| Labour | Ayfer Orhan | 10,295 | 20.8 | −18.9 |
| BNP | Janet Price | 1,615 | 3.3 | New |
| UKIP | David Alexander | 1,254 | 2.5 | −0.7 |
| Independent | Mick Young | 271 | 0.5 | New |
| Majority | | 13,406 | 27.1 | +26.7 |
| Turnout | | 49,471 | 68.0 | +3.5 |
| Registered electors | | 72,754 | | |
| Conservative hold | | Swing | +2.0 | |

This was the highest swing from Labour to Conservative in the 2010 general election.

=== Elections in the 2000s ===
2005 notional result
| Party | Vote | % |
|---|---|---|
| Conservative | 18,591 | 40.1 |
| Labour | 18,404 | 39.7 |
| Liberal Democrats | 7,856 | 17.0 |
| Others | 1,483 | 3.2 |
| Turnout | 46,334 | 64.5 |
| Electorate | 71,891 | |

General election 2005: Hemel Hempstead
| Party | Candidate | Votes | % | ±% |
|---|---|---|---|---|
| Conservative | Mike Penning | 19,000 | 40.3 | +1.9 |
| Labour Co-op | Tony McWalter | 18,501 | 39.3 | −7.3 |
| Liberal Democrats | Richard Grayson | 8,089 | 17.2 | +4.4 |
| UKIP | Barry Newton | 1,518 | 3.2 | +1.1 |
| Majority | | 499 | 1.1 | N/A |
| Turnout | | 47,108 | 64.4 | +0.8 |
| Registered electors | | 73,095 | | |
| Conservative gain from Labour Co-op | | Swing | +4.6 | |

General election 2001: Hemel Hempstead
| Party | Candidate | Votes | % | ±% |
|---|---|---|---|---|
| Labour Co-op | Tony McWalter | 21,389 | 46.6 | +0.9 |
| Conservative | Paul Ivey | 17,647 | 38.5 | −0.6 |
| Liberal Democrats | Neil Stuart | 5,877 | 12.8 | +0.5 |
| UKIP | Barry Newton | 970 | 2.1 | New |
| Majority | | 3,742 | 8.2 | +1.6 |
| Turnout | | 45,883 | 63.7 | −13.4 |
| Registered electors | | 72,086 | | |
| Labour Co-op hold | | Swing | +0.8 | |

=== Elections in the 1990s ===
General election 1997: Hemel Hempstead
| Party | Candidate | Votes | % | ±% |
|---|---|---|---|---|
| Labour Co-op | Tony McWalter | 25,175 | 45.7 | +13.2 |
| Conservative | Robert Jones | 21,539 | 39.1 | −10.8 |
| Liberal Democrats | Patricia Lindsley | 6,789 | 12.3 | −3.0 |
| Referendum | Peter Such | 1,327 | 2.4 | New |
| Natural Law | Diana M. Harding | 262 | 0.5 | |
| Majority | | 3,636 | 6.6 | N/A |
| Turnout | | 55,092 | 76.6 | –5.0 |
| Registered electors | | 71,468 | | |
| Labour Co-op gain from Conservative | | Swing | +12.0 | |

1992 notional result
| Party | Vote | % |
|---|---|---|
| Conservative | 29,248 | 49.8 |
| Labour | 19,090 | 32.5 |
| Liberal Democrats | 9,005 | 15.4 |
| Others | 1,313 | 2.2 |
| Turnout | 58,656 | 82.1 |
| Electorate | 71,471 | |

== Election results 1918–1979 ==
=== Elections in the 1970s ===
General election 1979: Hemel Hempstead
| Party | Candidate | Votes | % | ±% |
|---|---|---|---|---|
| Conservative | Nicholas Lyell | 37,953 | 48.7 | +6.8 |
| Labour | Robin Corbett | 32,964 | 42.3 | −0.4 |
| Liberal | David Penwarden | 6,314 | 8.1 | −7.2 |
| National Front | T Walters | 649 | 0.8 | New |
| Majority | | 4,989 | 6.4 | N/A |
| Turnout | | 77,880 | 84.8 | +3.1 |
| Registered electors | | 91,843 | | |
| Conservative gain from Labour | | Swing | +3.6 | |

General election October 1974: Hemel Hempstead
| Party | Candidate | Votes | % | ±% |
|---|---|---|---|---|
| Labour | Robin Corbett | 29,223 | 42.7 | +3.9 |
| Conservative | James Allason | 28,738 | 42.0 | +2.9 |
| Liberal | CAM Baron | 10,497 | 15.3 | −6.9 |
| Majority | | 485 | 0.7 | N/A |
| Turnout | | 68,458 | 81.7 | −3.5 |
| Registered electors | | 83,795 | | |
| Labour gain from Conservative | | Swing | +0.5 | |

General election February 1974: Hemel Hempstead
| Party | Candidate | Votes | % | ±% |
|---|---|---|---|---|
| Conservative | James Allason | 27,572 | 39.0 | −9.2 |
| Labour | Robin Corbett | 27,385 | 38.8 | −1.1 |
| Liberal | CAM Baron | 15,682 | 22.2 | +10.3 |
| Majority | | 187 | 0.3 | −8.1 |
| Turnout | | 70,639 | 85.2 | +7.2 |
| Registered electors | | 82,877 | | |
| Conservative hold | | Swing | −4.0 | |

1970 notional result
| Party | Vote | % |
|---|---|---|
| Conservative | 30,000 | 48.2 |
| Labour | 24,800 | 39.9 |
| Liberal | 7,400 | 11.9 |
| Turnout | 62,200 | 78.0 |
| Electorate | 79,737 | |

General election 1970: Hemel Hempstead
| Party | Candidate | Votes | % | ±% |
|---|---|---|---|---|
| Conservative | James Allason | 40,417 | 51.98 | |
| Labour | Peter A. Fletcher | 28,067 | 36.10 | |
| Liberal | A. John Wilson | 9,274 | 11.93 | |
| Majority | | 12,350 | 15.88 | |
| Turnout | | 77,758 | 78.10 | −6.61 |
| Registered electors | | 99,561 | | |
| Conservative hold | | Swing | | |

=== Elections in the 1960s ===
General election 1966: Hemel Hempstead
| Party | Candidate | Votes | % | ±% |
|---|---|---|---|---|
| Conservative | James Allason | 31,742 | 44.45 | |
| Labour | Robin Corbett | 29,704 | 41.59 | |
| Liberal | A. John Whiteside | 9,970 | 13.96 | |
| Majority | | 2,038 | 2.86 | |
| Turnout | | 71,416 | 84.71 | +0.19 |
| Registered electors | | 84,310 | | |
| Conservative hold | | Swing | | |

General election 1964: Hemel Hempstead
| Party | Candidate | Votes | % | ±% |
|---|---|---|---|---|
| Conservative | James Allason | 31,119 | 44.85 | |
| Labour | Gilbert D. Hitchcock | 26,273 | 37.87 | |
| Liberal | A. John Whiteside | 11,986 | 17.28 | |
| Majority | | 4,846 | 6.98 | |
| Turnout | | 69,378 | 84.52 | |
| Registered electors | | 82,087 | | |
| Conservative hold | | Swing | | |

=== Elections in the 1950s ===
General election 1959: Hemel Hempstead
| Party | Candidate | Votes | % | ±% |
|---|---|---|---|---|
| Conservative | James Allason | 30,189 | 49.90 | |
| Labour | Bernard Floud | 21,954 | 36.29 | |
| Liberal | Margaret Neilson | 8,358 | 13.81 | |
| Majority | | 8,235 | 13.61 | |
| Turnout | | 70,501 | 85.26 | |
| Registered electors | | 70,962 | | |
| Conservative hold | | Swing | | |

General election 1955: Hemel Hempstead
| Party | Candidate | Votes | % | ±% |
|---|---|---|---|---|
| Conservative | Frances Davidson | 25,648 | 51.02 | |
| Labour | Norman MacKenzie | 19,512 | 38.81 | |
| Liberal | Edwin Saich | 5,111 | 10.17 | New |
| Majority | | 6,136 | 12.21 | |
| Turnout | | 50,271 | 83.77 | |
| Registered electors | | 60,013 | | |
| Conservative hold | | Swing | | |

General election 1951: Hemel Hempstead
| Party | Candidate | Votes | % | ±% |
|---|---|---|---|---|
| Conservative | Frances Davidson | 25,620 | 58.44 | |
| Labour | Norman MacKenzie | 18,220 | 41.56 | |
| Majority | | 7,400 | 16.88 | |
| Turnout | | 43,840 | 83.80 | |
| Registered electors | | 52,313 | | |
| Conservative hold | | Swing | | |

General election 1950: Hemel Hempstead
| Party | Candidate | Votes | % |
|---|---|---|---|
| Conservative | Frances Davidson | 22,022 | 50.18 |
| Labour | Reg Moss | 15,165 | 34.56 |
| Liberal | Peter Arthur Stevens | 6,696 | 15.26 |
| Majority | | 6,857 | 15.62 |
| Turnout | | 43,883 | 85.07 |
| Registered electors | | 51,582 | |
| Conservative win (new boundaries) | | | |

=== Elections in the 1940s ===
General election 1945: Hemel Hempstead
| Party | Candidate | Votes | % | ±% |
|---|---|---|---|---|
| Conservative | Frances Davidson | 19,536 | 44.2 | −13.5 |
| Labour | DW Mobbs | 14,426 | 32.6 | +18.6 |
| Liberal | Thomas Alfred Trotter | 10,219 | 23.1 | −5.2 |
| Majority | | 5,110 | 11.6 | −17.8 |
| Turnout | | 44,181 | 71.0 | +16.0 |
| Registered electors | | 62,199 | | |
| Conservative hold | | Swing | −16.0 | |

General Election 1939–40: Another general election was required to take place before the end of 1940. The political parties had been making preparations for an election to take place from 1939 and by the end of this year, the following candidates had been selected;

- Conservative: Frances Davidson
- Liberal: Ian Davidson
- Labour: A W Harper

=== Elections in the 1930s ===
1937 Hemel Hempstead by-election
| Party | Candidate | Votes | % | ±% |
|---|---|---|---|---|
| Conservative | Frances Davidson | 14,992 | 57.7 | −4.8 |
| Liberal | Margery Corbett Ashby | 7,347 | 28.3 | +6.3 |
| Labour | Charles William James | 3,651 | 14.0 | −1.4 |
| Majority | | 7,645 | 29.4 | −11.1 |
| Turnout | | 25,990 | 55.0 | −14.3 |
| Registered electors | | | | |
| Conservative hold | | Swing | −5.6 | |

General election 1935: Hemel Hempstead
| Party | Candidate | Votes | % | ±% |
|---|---|---|---|---|
| Conservative | J. C. C. Davidson | 20,074 | 62.5 | −4.7 |
| Liberal | Margery Corbett Ashby | 7,078 | 22.0 | −2.6 |
| Labour | Charles William James | 4,951 | 15.4 | +7.2 |
| Majority | | 12,996 | 40.5 | −1.9 |
| Turnout | | 32,103 | 69.3 | −7.9 |
| Registered electors | | 46,290 | | |
| Conservative hold | | Swing | −1.1 | |

General election 1931: Hemel Hempstead
| Party | Candidate | Votes | % | ±% |
|---|---|---|---|---|
| Conservative | J. C. C. Davidson | 21,946 | 67.2 | +17.4 |
| Liberal | Charles Thomas Le Quesne | 8,021 | 24.6 | −13.7 |
| Labour | Albert E.R. Millar | 2,677 | 8.2 | −3.7 |
| Majority | | 13,925 | 42.6 | +31.1 |
| Turnout | | 32,644 | 77.2 | −0.8 |
| Registered electors | | | | |
| Conservative hold | | Swing | | |

=== Elections in the 1920s ===
General election 1929: Hemel Hempstead
| Party | Candidate | Votes | % | ±% |
|---|---|---|---|---|
| Unionist | J. C. C. Davidson | 15,145 | 49.8 | −7.8 |
| Liberal | Charles Thomas Le Quesne | 11,631 | 38.3 | +2.8 |
| Labour | Albert E.R. Millar | 3,624 | 11.9 | +5.0 |
| Majority | | 3,514 | 11.5 | −10.6 |
| Turnout | | 30,400 | 78.0 | −2.2 |
| Registered electors | | 38,957 | | |
| Unionist hold | | Swing | −5.3 | |

General election 1924: Hemel Hempstead
| Party | Candidate | Votes | % | ±% |
|---|---|---|---|---|
| Unionist | J. C. C. Davidson | 12,985 | 57.6 | +27.6 |
| Liberal | John Freeman Dunn | 7,994 | 35.5 | −14.5 |
| Labour | Amy Sayle | 1,553 | 6.9 | New |
| Majority | | 4,991 | 22.1 | N/A |
| Turnout | | 22,532 | 80.2 | +14.4 |
| Registered electors | | 28,106 | | |
| Unionist gain from Liberal | | Swing | +21.1 | |

General election 1923: Hemel Hempstead
| Party | Candidate | Votes | % | ±% |
|---|---|---|---|---|
| Liberal | John Freeman Dunn | 8,892 | 50.0 | New |
| Unionist | J. C. C. Davidson | 8,875 | 50.0 | −17.4 |
| Majority | | 17 | ±0.0 | N/A |
| Turnout | | 17,767 | 65.8 | −0.2 |
| Registered electors | | 26,990 | | |
| Liberal gain from Unionist | | Swing | | |

General election 1922: Hemel Hempstead
| Party | Candidate | Votes | % | ±% |
|---|---|---|---|---|
| Unionist | J. C. C. Davidson | 11,847 | 67.4 | −10.2 |
| Labour | John Harper Clynes | 5,726 | 32.6 | +10.2 |
| Majority | | 6,121 | 34.8 | −20.4 |
| Turnout | | 17,573 | 66.0 | +15.6 |
| Registered electors | | 26,627 | | |
| Unionist hold | | Swing | −10.2 | |

1920 Hemel Hempstead by-election
| Party | | Candidate | Votes | % | ±% |
|---|---|---|---|---|---|
| C | Unionist | J. C. C. Davidson | Unopposed | | |
| | Unionist hold | | | | |
C indicates candidate endorsed by the coalition government.

=== Elections in the 1910s ===
General election 1918: Hemel Hempstead
| Party | | Candidate | Votes | % |
|---|---|---|---|---|
| C | Unionist | Gustavus Arthur Talbot | 10,070 | 77.6 |
| | Labour | Jesse Hawkes | 2,913 | 22.4 |
| Majority | | | 7,157 | 55.2 |
| Turnout | | | 12,983 | 50.4 |
| Registered electors | | | 25,752 | |
| | Unionist win (new seat) | | | |
C indicates candidate endorsed by the coalition government.

== See also ==
- List of parliamentary constituencies in Hertfordshire
- List of parliamentary constituencies in the East of England (region)

== Sources ==
- Craig, F. W. S. (1983) [1969]. British parliamentary election results 1918-1949 (3rd ed.). Chichester: Parliamentary Research Services. ISBN 0-900178-06-X.
