= Great Leighs =

Village in Essex, England

Coordinates: 51.826628°N 0.505757°E

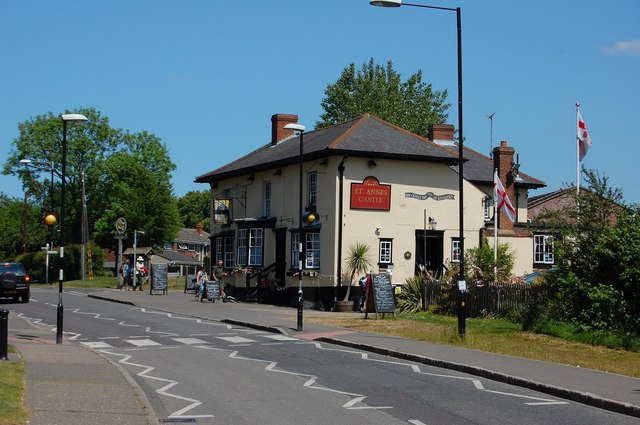
- Former St Anne's Castle, Great Leighs

- Location within Essex
- OS grid reference: TL725175
- Civil parish: Great and Little Leighs
- District: Chelmsford
- Shire county: Essex
- Region: East
- Country: England
- Sovereign state: United Kingdom
- Post town: Chelmsford
- Postcode district: CM3 1
- Dialling code: 01245
- Police: Essex
- Fire: Essex
- Ambulance: East of England
- UK Parliament: Chelmsford

Great Leighs is a village in the civil parish of Great and Little Leighs, in the Chelmsford district of Essex, England, halfway between Chelmsford itself and Braintree.

== History ==
The name Leighs comes from the Old English leah meaning a clearing in a wood.

In Saxon times there appears to have been a single vill called Leighs. It was recorded in the Domesday Book of 1086 as Lega in the Chelmsford hundred of Essex. The vill was at that time split between two owners.

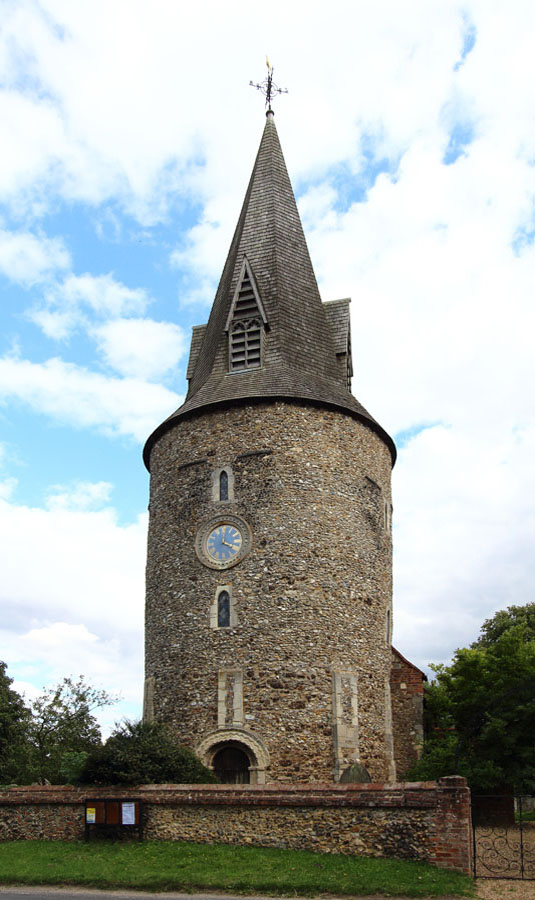
St Mary's Church

No church or priest was mentioned at Leighs in the Domesday Book, but it subsequently came to be administered as two parishes, Great Leighs and Little Leighs. Great Leigh's parish church of St Mary dates back to the late 12th century and has a distinctive round tower.

St Mary's Church stands 1 mile (1.6 km) south-east of the main part of the modern village of Great Leighs. The modern village was historically known as the hamlet of Chatley and stands on the old road (formerly the A131, now bypassed to the west) linking Chelmsford to Braintree. Whilst in the Domesday Book the whole of Leighs was listed in Chelmsford hundred, the hamlet of Chatley came to be part of the Witham hundred whereas the rest of Great Leighs parish remained in the Chelmsford hundred.

The village has two public houses: the Castle Inn and the Dog and Partridge, both on Main Road. The Castle, formerly called the St Anne's Castle, has a long history. The current building dates from the early 19th century, but it was built on the site of a medieval hermitage known as St Anne's which served as a resting place for pilgrims on their way to and from the tomb of Thomas Becket at Canterbury. The old hermitage continued to serve as a hostelry after the pilgrimages ceased at the Reformation.

In December 2009, a £730,000 project to renovate the Village Hall was completed. It was aided by money associated with a new housing development within the village, extensive fund raising and help from funding bodies and Essex County Council.

The incumbent priest during the First World War, Andrew Clark, kept a voluminous diary of the war detailing activities, opinions and rumours in the village and nearby. An edited version of the diary was published in 1985 under the title Echoes of the Great War.

In the 2014 BBC series Britain's Great War, Jeremy Paxman visited St Mary's Church, Great Leighs, and he described the early loss of Captain Alan Tritton and brothers Privates Richard (Dick) and Arthur Fitch. He spoke with their niece, Valerie Frost.

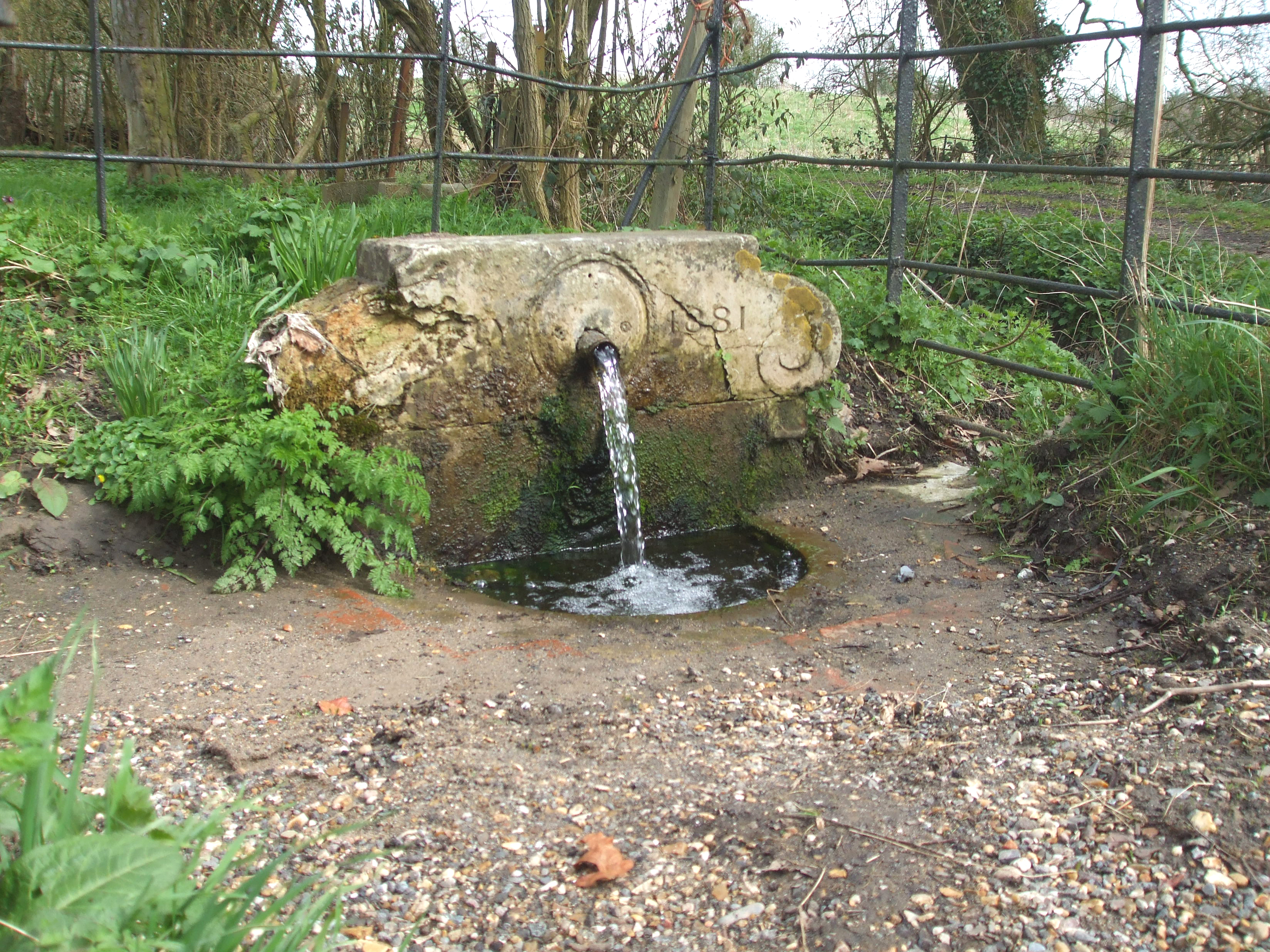
Spring on Cole Hill

There is a spring by the side of the road at Cole Hill on Boreham Road, near Great Leighs Church. It once had a lion's head over the outlet.

On 1 April 1949, the parish was merged with neighbouring Little Leighs to form a new civil parish called "Great and Little Leighs", subject to a minor adjustment to the boundary with Little Waltham at the same time. At the 1931 census (the last before the abolition of the civil parish), Great Leighs had a population of 728.

Gate Farmhouse on Moulsham Hall Lane is a Grade II Listed Georgian property and the home of journalist Simon Heffer. It was built between 1820 and 1850.

== Racecourse ==
In 2008, Great Leighs became home to the first new racecourse in 80 years, when the nearby Essex County Showground was converted into a state-of-the-art horse-racing venue. Great Leighs Racecourse held its first race meeting on 20 April 2008 and staged its first meeting fully open to the public from 28 to 29 May 2008. However, the course had its temporary licence revoked on 16 January 2009 and did not see racing again until 11 January 2015.

== Notable people ==
- Bandleader Sydney Kyte lived in the village prior to his death in 1981.
