= J. C. C. Davidson =

British civil servant and Conservative Party politician

The Right Honourable The Viscount Davidson GCVO CH CB PC
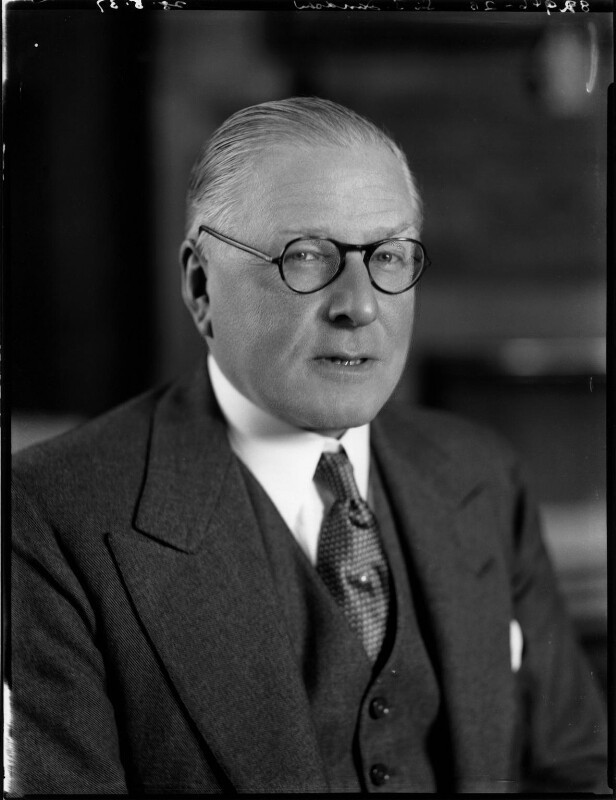

Chancellor of the Duchy of Lancaster
- In office 25 May 1923 – 22 January 1924
- Monarch: George V
- Prime Minister: Stanley Baldwin
- Preceded by: The Marquess of Salisbury
- Succeeded by: Josiah Wedgwood
- In office 10 November 1931 – 28 May 1937
- Monarchs: George V Edward VIII; George VI
- Prime Minister: Ramsay MacDonald; Stanley Baldwin
- Preceded by: The Marquess of Lothian
- Succeeded by: The Earl Winterton

Member of the House of Lords
- Lord Temporal
- In office 21 June 1937 – 11 December 1970
- Preceded by: Peerage created
- Succeeded by: The 2nd Viscount Davidson

Personal details
- Born: John Colin Campbell Davidson; 23 February 1889
- Died: 11 December 1970 (aged 81)
- Party: Conservative
- Spouse: Hon. Frances Dickinson (1894–1985)
- Children: 4, including Andrew
- Education: Pembroke College, Cambridge

John Colin Campbell Davidson, 1st Viscount Davidson (23 February 1889 – 11 December 1970), known before his elevation to the peerage as J. C. C. Davidson, was a British civil servant and Conservative Party politician, best known for his close alliance with Stanley Baldwin. Initially a civil servant, Davidson was private secretary to Bonar Law between 1915 and 1920. After entering parliament in 1920, he served under Baldwin as Chancellor of the Duchy of Lancaster between 1923 and 1924 and as Parliamentary and Financial Secretary to the Admiralty between 1924 and 1926. From 1926 to 1930 he was Chairman of the Conservative Party. He was once again Chancellor of the Duchy of Lancaster between 1931 and 1937, firstly under Ramsay MacDonald and from 1935 onwards under Baldwin. On Baldwin's retirement in 1937, Davidson left the House of Commons and was ennobled as Viscount Davidson. Despite being only 48, he never took any further active part in politics. His wife Frances, Viscountess Davidson, succeeded him as MP for Hemel Hempstead. Lord Davidson died in London in 1970.

== Background and education ==
Davidson was born at Aberdeen, the younger child and only son of Sir James Mackenzie Davidson, a physician and pioneer of X-rays, by Georgina Barbara Watt Henderson, daughter of William Henderson, of Aberdeen. His grandfather John Davidson had accumulated a large fortune in Argentina, of which Davidson inherited a half. He was educated at Fretherne House preparatory school, Westminster and Pembroke College, Cambridge, and was called to the Bar, Middle Temple, in 1913.

== Civil service career, 1910–1920 ==
After leaving Cambridge in 1910, Davidson joined the Colonial Office, where he became unpaid private secretary to Lord Crewe, the Secretary of State for the Colonies. He continued in this post when Lewis Harcourt succeeded Crewe as Colonial secretary at the end of 1910. Davidson was anxious to serve in the First World War, but Harcourt considered him so valuable that he managed to convince him to stay at the Colonial Office. In 1915 Bonar Law replaced Harcourt as head of the Colonial Office, and was urged to retain Davidson as private secretary. They became close friends and Law came to rely as heavily on Davidson as Harcourt had done.

In December 1916 Bonar Law was appointed Chancellor of the Exchequer and Leader of the House of Commons and insisted on taking Davidson with him as private secretary. Davidson managed to persuade Bonar Law to employ Stanley Baldwin as his Parliamentary Private Secretary, a move that would have far-reaching consequences for Davidson himself and for the nation's history. Baldwin had up until then been an obscure back-bench MP, but his appointment as PPS to Bonar Law was his first move on the ladder of promotion. Davidson and Baldwin developed a close friendship which lasted until Baldwin's death in 1947. In 1918 he was responsible for the final draft of the "coupon" endorsing parliamentary candidates in the general election as representatives of the coalition government. In 1919 he was appointed a Companion of the Order of the Bath (CB).

== Political career, 1920–1937 ==
Davidson entered parliament unopposed for Hemel Hempstead in a 1920 by-election and became Parliamentary Private Secretary to Bonar Law, then Lord Privy Seal and Leader of the House of Commons. The latter resigned on the grounds of ill health in May 1921, when Davidson became PPS to Stanley Baldwin, who by then had become President of the Board of Trade. The following year he urged Bonar Law to return and accept the leadership of the Conservative Party if the party voted against continuing the coalition government headed by David Lloyd George. Despite the wishes of the party leadership, a majority of MP's voted against continuing the coalition at the Carlton Club meeting in October 1922. Austen Chamberlain resigned as party leader and was succeeded by Bonar Law. Shortly afterwards Bonar Law was asked to form a government and once again appointed Davidson as his Parliamentary Private Secretary and unofficial unpaid private secretary.

Bonar Law resigned in May 1923 after his health collapsed. Davidson was appointed a Member of the Order of the Companions of Honour in the short resignation honours list which was issued that same month. Stanley Baldwin was chosen to succeed Bonar Law as Prime Minister over the claims of Lord Curzon. In his biography of Davidson in the Dictionary of National Biography, Robert Blake writes that Davidson's role in the appointment of Baldwin remains a puzzle. Lord Stamfordham, George V's private secretary, sounded out Davidson on Bonar Law's wishes for his successor. Bonar Law, now gravely ill, asked not to be involved, but it was apparent that he favoured Baldwin although he could not overlook the claims of party grandee, Curzon. In 1954, a memorandum was found in the Royal Archives that had obviously been dictated by Davidson and clearly argued for the claims of Baldwin over Curzon. The note had been handed over to Stamfordham by Sir Ronald Waterhouse, another of Bonar Law's secretaries, at the same time as his official resignation as Prime Minister. Stamfordham had noted on the memorandum that it "practically expressed the views of Mr. Bonar Law". According to Blake, there was nothing in the memorandum to substantiate that claim. Davidson subsequently said that he had dictated the note after being asked by Stamfordham about the opinion of back-bench MP's. However, Blake argued, "In any case, the result [Baldwin as Bonar Law's successor] was affected only marginally. The King's decision was firmly based on his own good sense and the powerful arguments of Balfour against the choice of a peer as prime minister".

Following the appointment of Baldwin as prime minister, Davidson entered the government as Chancellor of the Duchy of Lancaster, and effectively continued as the prime minister's private secretary. However, he lost his seat in parliament at the general election of December 1923, but regained it already in the general election in October the following year. Baldwin once again formed an administration after the brief first-ever 1924 Labour government, and made Davidson Parliamentary and Financial Secretary to the Admiralty. In this post he was forced to deal with cuts in naval expenditure proposed by the Chancellor of the Exchequer, Winston Churchill, especially regarding the construction of new cruisers. He served as deputy chief civil commissioner during the general strike of 1926, with responsibility for publicity. He also managed the short-lived British Gazette during the strike and arranged for the broadcasting of official bulletins.

In 1926 Davidson left the government to take up the post of Chairman of the Conservative Party, which he remained until 1930. He was primarily charged with raising cash for the party and cleaning up the honours system, which had fallen into disrepute following informal cash-for-honours system instigated by Lloyd George in 1918. He was also the driving force behind the establishment of Ashridge in memory of Bonar Law. In 1928 he was sworn of the Privy Council. According to Blake, Davidson "left a lasting imprint on the organization of the party, including the creation of the Research Department, and many of the changes attributed to his successor, Neville Chamberlain, were in fact his". However, Davidson came under criticism after the defeat at the 1929 general election and resigned in 1930.

In November 1931 Davidson was once again appointed Chancellor of the Duchy of Lancaster in the National Government headed by Ramsay MacDonald. He was chairman of the Indian States inquiry committee and travelled to India in 1932 and was made a member of the joint select committee whose proposals resulted in the Government of India Act 1935. He declined the governorship of Bombay. He invited Joachim von Ribbentrop to meet with Stanley Baldwin for the first time in Westminster to discuss Hitler's ideas about equality in armaments. He remained Chancellor of the Duchy of Lancaster when Baldwin became Prime Minister for the third time in 1935, although he was never a member of the cabinet. The latter year he was also made a Knight Grand Cross of the Royal Victorian Order (GCVO). He stepped down from the government and the House of Commons after Neville Chamberlain became Prime Minister in May 1937. The following June he was elevated to the peerage as Viscount Davidson, of Little Gaddesden in the County of Hertford. He was succeeded as MP by his wife, Frances, Viscountess Davidson (see below).

== Later career, 1937–1970 ==
Despite being only 48 at the time of his elevation to the peerage, Davidson took no further active part in political life. He remained involved with Ashridge and his business affairs. During the Second World War he was with the Ministry of Information between 1940 and 1941 and made an official tour of South America in 1942. This was followed in 1943 with his foundation of Canning House, an important centre for Latin American culture and education. Blake writes of Davidson: "A man of much charm and geniality, bespectacled and ruddy complexioned, Davidson could be very tough. He was essentially one who operated behind the scenes rather than on the front of the stage. A streak of Scottish puritanism put him emphatically on the side of the 'respectable'. He had no sympathy with the buccaneers – Lloyd George, Churchill, Birkenhead, Beaverbrook. He was deeply devoted to Baldwin who owed a great debt to his advice, companionship, and support."

== Marriage and children ==
Davidson married Frances Joan "Mimi" Dickinson, daughter of Sir Willoughby Dickinson, later Lord Dickinson of Painswick, in 1919. They had two sons and two daughters:

- Hon. Margaret Joan Davidson (24 June 1922 – 11 May 2008)
- Hon. Jean Elizabeth Davidson (19 June 1924 – 15 August 2020), married the Hon. Charles Strutt, son of Robert Strutt, 4th Baron Rayleigh. They had three children, the youngest of whom is John Gerald Strutt, 6th Baron Rayleigh, and the eldest is Anne Jenkin, Baroness Jenkin of Kennington.
- (John) Andrew Davidson, 2nd Viscount Davidson (22 December 1928 – 22 July 2012)
- Malcolm William Mackenzie Davidson, 3rd Viscount Davidson (28 August 1934 – 27 September 2019)

Lady Davidson remained MP for Hemel Hempstead until 1959, and was created a life peer as Baroness Northchurch in 1963. Lord and Lady Davidson thereby became one of the few couples who both held titles in their own right.

== Death ==
Lord Davidson died in London in December 1970, at the age of 81. He was succeeded in the viscountcy by his eldest son Andrew, who also became a Conservative government minister. Andrew died in 2012 and the title passed to his brother Malcolm who became the 3rd Viscount.

Viscountess Davidson died in November 1985, aged 91.

== In popular culture ==
Davidson was featured prominently in Jack Thorne's 2023 play When Winston Went to War with the Wireless, played by Ravin J Ganatra.

== Arms ==
Coat of arms of J. C. C. Davidson
Crest A lion passant Gules charged on the shoulder with a pheon Or and holding in the dexter paw a torch inflamed Proper. Escutcheon Argent on a fess Sable between in chief two pheons Azure and in base a boar's head erased of the second a portcullis chained Or. Supporters On the dexter side a horse Argent charged on the shoulder with a rose Gules barbed and seeded Proper and on the sinister side a horse Sable charged on the shoulder with a martlet Or. Motto Lux Ex Tenebris

Parliament of the United Kingdom
Preceded by Gustavus Talbot	Member of Parliament for Hemel Hempstead; 1920–1923	Succeeded by John Freeman Dunn
Preceded by John Freeman Dunn	Member of Parliament for Hemel Hempstead; 1924–1937	Succeeded by The Viscountess Davidson
Political offices
Preceded by The Marquess of Salisbury	Chancellor of the Duchy of Lancaster; 1923–1924	Succeeded by Josiah Wedgwood
Preceded by Charles Ammon	Parliamentary and Financial Secretary to the Admiralty; 1924–1926	Succeeded by Cuthbert Headlam
Preceded by The Marquess of Lothian	Chancellor of the Duchy of Lancaster; 1931–1937	Succeeded by The Earl Winterton
Party political offices
Preceded by Stanley Jackson	Chairman of the Conservative Party; 1926–1930	Succeeded by Neville Chamberlain
Peerage of the United Kingdom
New creation	Viscount Davidson; 1937–1970; Member of the House of Lords (1937–1970)	Succeeded by Andrew Davidson
