= Gabri =

Gabri may refer to:

== People ==
=== Footballers ===
- Gabri (footballer, born 1979), Spanish football midfielder and manager Gabriel Francisco García de la Torre
- Gabri (footballer, born 1985), Spanish football forward Gabriel Gómez Román
- Gabriel Gabri Cardozo (born 1997), Uruguayan football defender
- Gabriel Gabri Izquier (born 1993), Spanish football left back
- Gabriel Gabri Jimeno (born 2003), Spanish football forward
- Gabriel Gabri Martínez (born 2003), Spanish football forward
- Gabriel Gabri Valero (born 2007), Spanish football winger
- Gabriel Gabri Veiga (born 2002), Spanish football midfielder

=== Other people ===
- Gabri Christa, Curacao-Dutch performance artist, choreographer, professor, film-maker and writer

== Other uses ==
- Gabri, Iran, a village in Qazvin Province
- Zoroastrian Dari language, referred to pejoratively as Gabri
- Storm Gabri, in the 2024–25 European windstorm season

== See also ==
- Gabri Castle, Tehran province, Iran
- Southern Gabri language, spoken in Chad
