= Artiles =

Artiles is a surname. Notable people with the surname include:

- Aythami Artiles (born 1986), Spanish footballer
- Frank Artiles (born 1973), American politician
- Gabriel Izquier Artiles (born 1993), Spanish footballer
- Jesús Cruz Artiles (born 1979), Dominican-born artist
- José Artiles (born 1993), Spanish footballer
