= Will Smith–Chris Rock slapping incident =

Live-television incident in 2022

- Shot of Smith slapping Rock
- Date: March 27, 2022; 4 years ago
- Venue: Dolby Theatre
- Location: Hollywood, Los Angeles, California
- Also known as: "The Slap Heard Around the World" "Slapgate" "The Slappening" "The Will Smith Slap"
- Type: Battery by facial slapping
- Target: Chris Rock
- Perpetrator: Will Smith
- Outcome: Smith is given a 10-year ban from all Academy events (Note: Smith resigned from the Academy before this was implemented.); Several of Smith's projects were either put on hold, delayed or cancelled
- Charges: None (Note: No one filed a police report, LAPD filed no charges.)

During the 94th Academy Awards on March 27, 2022, actor Will Smith walked onstage and slapped comedian Chris Rock across the face during Rock's presentation for Best Documentary Feature. The slap was in response to an unscripted joke Rock made about Smith's wife Jada Pinkett Smith's shaved head, a result of alopecia. Rock said that he "can't wait to see" Pinkett Smith in a sequel to the film G.I. Jane (1997), in which Demi Moore's titular character has a shaved head. After slapping Rock, Smith returned to his seat and shouted profanity at Rock, who briefly responded before completing his presentation without further interruption.

Later that evening, Smith won Best Actor for his role in King Richard. In his acceptance speech, he apologized to the Academy of Motion Picture Arts and Sciences (AMPAS) and other nominees, but not to Rock. The next day, he issued an apology to Rock and the AMPAS through social media. Smith resigned his Academy membership on April 1, facing a potential suspension or expulsion, and was banned from attending AMPAS events for 10 years.

Live television broadcasts in the United States mostly muted the incident due to federal censorship laws. However, uncensored international footage went viral on social media; an excerpt from the Australian broadcast became one of the most-viewed online videos in the first 24 hours. The incident received worldwide attention and largely overshadowed the rest of the ceremony. Reactions to the incident were polarized, with most expressing disapproval of Smith's actions.

== Background ==
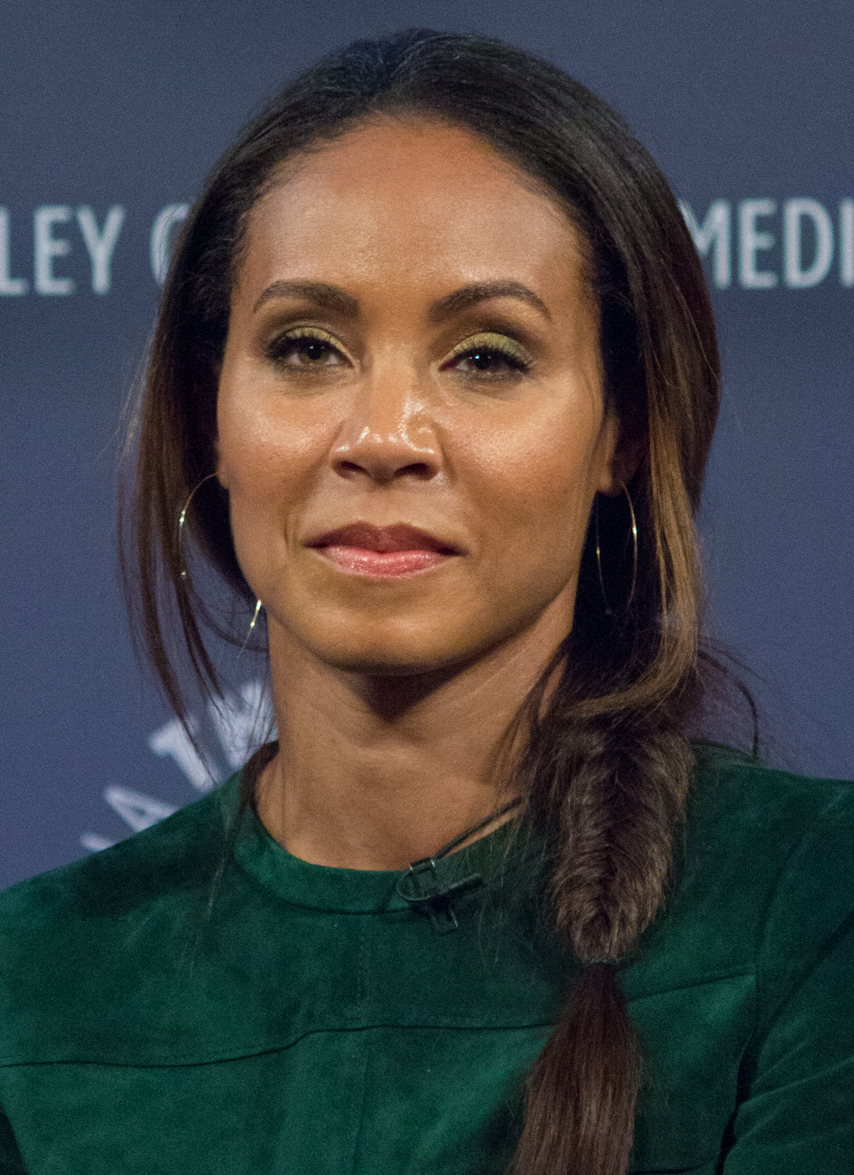
Jada Pinkett Smith

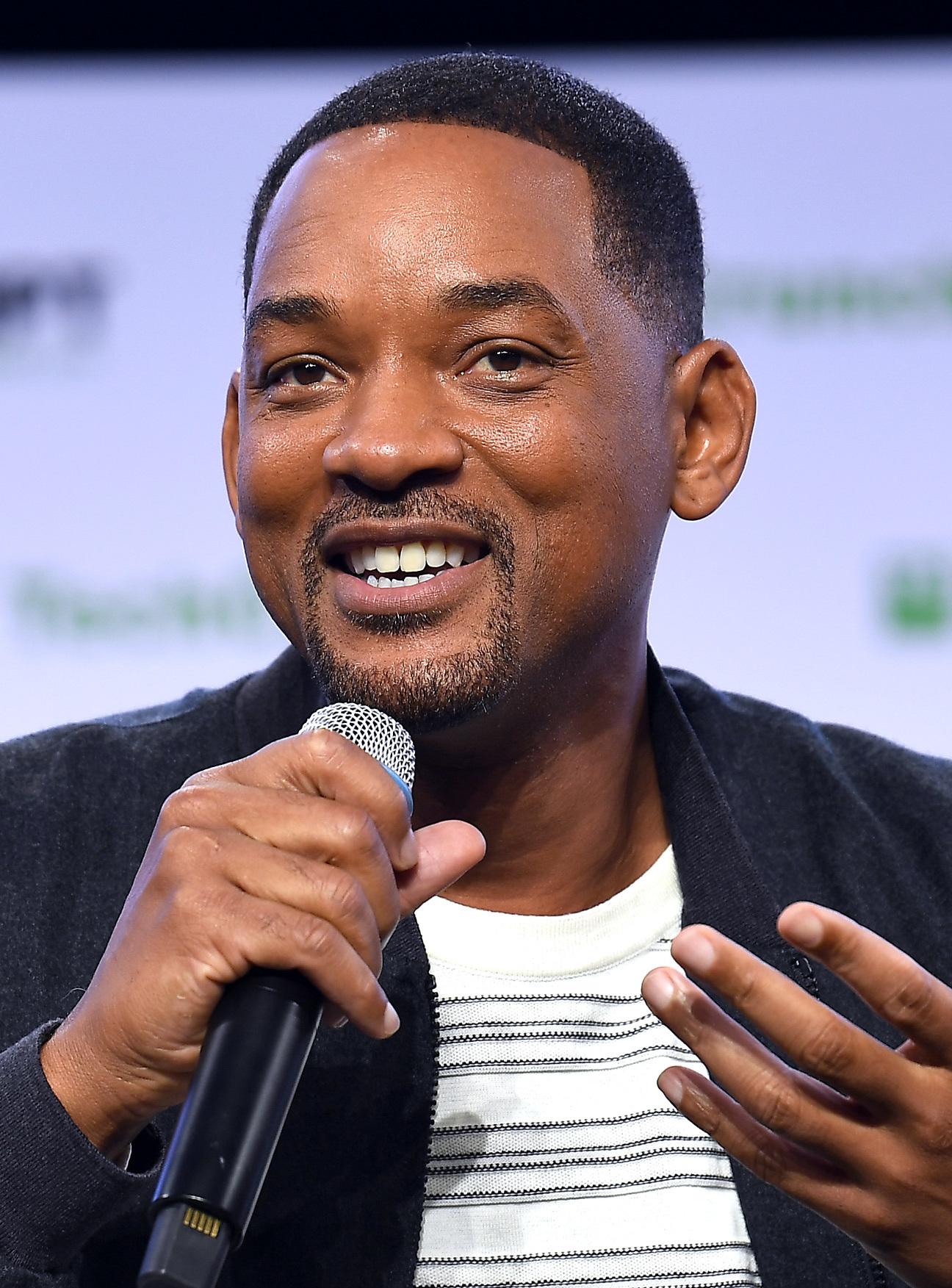
Will Smith

Chris Rock

Jada Pinkett Smith (born Pinkett) is an American actress who rose to fame in 1991 for her role in the television show A Different World. In 1994, she met Will Smith on the set of Smith's television show The Fresh Prince of Bel-Air. The pair married in 1997, and she changed her name to Jada Pinkett Smith.

Pinkett Smith and comedian Chris Rock had a long history of interactions. The pair worked together on the Madagascar films. In 1997, in an interview on his late-night talk show The Chris Rock Show, he had commented on her participation in the Million Woman March. Rock had previously hosted the awards twice, including in 2016, which several actors (including Pinkett Smith) boycotted due to the lack of African-American nominees. Rock joked in his opening monologue, "Jada boycotting the Oscars is like me boycotting Rihanna's panties. I wasn't invited."

In 2018, on her talk show Red Table Talk, Pinkett Smith revealed she had been experiencing hair loss, potentially because of stress. She was diagnosed with alopecia areata and in July 2021, she started completely shaving her head.

By February 8, 2022, Will Smith had been nominated for an Academy Award for his acting in the film King Richard. The Academy of Motion Picture Arts and Sciences announced Rock as one of the presenters of 94th Academy Awards, taking place on March 27, 2022.

== Incident ==
Rock announced the nominees for Best Documentary Feature, performing a brief monologue largely read from a teleprompter script. Smith and Pinkett Smith were seated together near the front of the audience. Rock made an unscripted comment about Pinkett Smith's shaved head, comparing her to the titular character in the 1997 film G.I. Jane.

Chris Rock: Jada, I love you. G.I. Jane 2, can't wait to see it, all right?

Much of the audience, including Smith, laughed, while Pinkett Smith rolled her eyes in annoyance. Just as Rock was about to continue his speech, he noticed Smith rising from his seat, and jokingly addressed him as "Richard" in reference to Smith's portrayal of the titular character in King Richard.

Rock: It's—that was a—that was a nice one! Okay, I'm out here—uh oh—Richard! [laughs]

As Rock continued to laugh, Smith walked across the stage, slapped Rock across the left cheek, then turned around and walked back to his seat. Many in the audience initially thought that the attack was scripted; physical violence was incongruous with the calm, positive persona that Smith had maintained throughout his career. When Smith began shouting at Rock, however, the audience realized that his outburst was genuine.

Rock: Oh, wow! Wow! Will Smith just smacked the shit out of me. [audience laughs] Thi—

Will Smith: [shouting from the audience] Keep my wife's name out your fucking mouth!

[audience gasps]

Rock: Wow, dude!

Smith: Yes.

Rock: It was a G.I. Jane joke.

Smith: [slower; voice rising] Keep my wife's name out your fucking mouth!

Rock: I'm going to, okay? Oh, I could, oh, okay. That was a... greatest night in the history of television, okay. [audience laughs] Okay. So we are here... to, uh... give a documentary out—to give an Oscar out for best documentary.

Smith's expletives were censored by audio muting during the live broadcast in many countries. The audience expected an explanation for the incident, but the show did not use hosts from this point on.

=== Photograph ===
Photojournalist Brian Snyder, working for Reuters in the photographer pool in the projection booth, photographed Smith striking Rock. This photo quickly went viral, was featured in news stories, and was adapted into Internet memes. He was unaware of the photo's cultural impact until after the ceremony, as his photos are automatically sent to his editors. He was profiled by multiple media outlets, including photography outlet PetaPixel. Another described him as "The One Winner In The Will Smith vs. Chris Rock 'Smackdown'", speculating that "Surely, Snyder will now win the most coveted and prestigious photojournalism award, the World Press Photo of the Year, thanks to his photo that captured the moment Smith hit Rock, as his photo has been used by every publication under the sun."

=== Uncensored viewership ===
In the United States, broadcaster ABC muted Rock's and Smith's expletives due to federal censorship laws. However, many international broadcasters chose not to, and uncensored recordings of the event went viral on social media. The uncensored footage from the Australian broadcast on the Seven Network was posted by The Guardian on YouTube and received more than 50 million views within 24 hours.

=== Additional videos ===
Additional smartphone footage was published on March 31 from an audience member's perspective of the Smiths' table. This seems to show the reaction of Pinkett Smith during and after the joke, as unamused and rolling her eyes during the joke but then seeming to laugh when Rock commented, "Will Smith just smacked the shit out of me".

== Aftermath ==
=== Initial response ===
Immediately after the incident, Rock continued his presentation for Best Documentary Feature, which was awarded to the crew of Summer of Soul. Smith continued to participate in the ceremony and subsequent celebrations. Some in attendance were surprised that no actions were taken; others wondered whether Smith would be allowed to stay. Within forty minutes, Smith was presented the award for Best Actor for his portrayal of Richard Williams in King Richard. He focused his emotional speech on divine justification and his need to protect those around him: "Love will make you do crazy things", he said, and apologized to the Academy, the other nominees, and to Richard's daughters Venus and Serena, who were in attendance. However, he did not extend an apology to Chris Rock until the next day. The live audience gave Smith two standing ovations. Anthony Hopkins, who then presented the Academy Award for Best Actress, directly addressed Smith's behavior and Best Actor speech within his own speech, stating, "Will Smith said it all. What more can be said? Let's have peace and love and quiet."

According to the Academy, Smith was asked to leave the ceremony but refused. However, others who were present in the hall denied that Smith was ever asked to leave, either directly or through a representative. Backstage disagreement ensued between members of the Academy's leadership and ceremony producer Will Packer on whether Smith should be allowed to stay, which led to no action being taken. Variety reported that Packer "was the key to Smith remaining in his seat". Packer opposed suggestions to remove Smith from the theater because he did not believe that Rock would agree.

After the ceremony, award winners were advised to only answer questions about their work and nothing else. LAPD officers met with Packer, who later recalled that they were prepared to arrest Smith on charges of battery. Rock repeatedly declined to press charges. Early the next morning, Smith's son Jaden tweeted, "And that's how we do it!" The tweet sparked mixed reactions, with many celebrities expressing strong disapproval. In the first of many consequences for Smith, Netflix canceled a planned sequel to Smith's 2017 urban fantasy action film Bright, mainly due to the negative publicity of Smith's altercation.

=== Public apologies ===
Following public backlash, Smith issued a formal apology on Instagram and Facebook the next day. He referred to his behavior as "unacceptable" and "inexcusable", directly addressing Rock: "I would like to publicly apologize to you, Chris. I was out of line and I was wrong. I am embarrassed and my actions were not indicative of the man I want to be. There is no place for violence in a world of love and kindness."

Three days after the incident, Rock briefly mentioned the subject for the first time at a comedy show, saying that he was still processing it, but promised to talk about it in the future. He said that Smith had not contacted him personally, nor had they spoken since the ceremony. Claims on social media that Rock had apologized were debunked by fact-checkers.

Smith posted a YouTube video on July 29 in which he addressed the incident and apologized to Rock, Rock's mother, Rock's brother Tony, Questlove, the other Oscar winners, and his wife Jada saying he was "deeply remorseful" for his actions.

=== Formal Academy review ===
The next day, March 28, the Academy's 42-member Board of Governors announced a formal review of the incident, scheduled for March 30. AMPAS President David Rubin and CEO Dawn Hudson announced this in an email to Academy members. The following day, Smith initiated a six-minute Zoom call with Rubin and Hudson, apologizing for his actions. The call was not mentioned at the review and the Board of Governors were not aware of the conversation when discussing disciplinary procedures. They charged Smith with "violations of the Academy's standards of conduct, including inappropriate physical contact, abusive or threatening behavior, and compromising the integrity of the Academy." The Academy said, "While we would like to clarify that Mr. Smith was asked to leave the ceremony and refused, we also recognize we could have handled the situation differently." Smith was invited to provide a written response within a fifteen-day period, after which the Board of Governors would vote on whether "suspension, expulsion or other sanctions under the Academy's standards of conduct" would be applied. Numerous Academy members said that AMPAS should, at the very least, suspend his membership, citing the organization's standards of conduct implemented eight weeks after Harvey Weinstein's acts of sexual abuse were exposed. When the board learned of Smith's apology call, one of the participants stated the lack of transparency to the board was suspicious and showed lack of leadership.

The Academy had never expelled a member prior to 2004, when the Board of Governors voted unanimously to expel actor Carmine Caridi for sharing promotional copies of films that were later mass-distributed. Subsequently, the Academy expelled Harvey Weinstein, Roman Polanski, Bill Cosby, and cinematographer Adam Kimmel for sexual crimes.

=== Resignation and ban ===
Smith preemptively resigned on April 1, 2022. AMPAS told him that he was likely to be expelled for a decade or more. AMPAS announced it would continue disciplinary proceedings for violations of the Academy's Standards of Conduct. Their next disciplinary meeting, scheduled for April 18, was intended to decide upon the issues unaddressed by Smith's resignation, including allowing him to retain his Best Actor Oscar for King Richard, allowing him to be invited by other members to future Academy Awards ceremonies, and allowing his nomination for future consideration while no longer a voting member of the Academy. Variety reported that Smith's other professional membership at SAG-AFTRA would be informed of the AMPAS disciplinary review outcome. The meeting was then moved earlier, to April 8; Rubin wrote that "Following Mr. Smith's resignation of his Academy membership on Friday, April 1, suspension or expulsion are no longer a possibility and the legally prescribed timetable no longer applies. It is in the best interest of all involved for this to be handled in a timely fashion."

At the April 8, 2022 meeting, Smith was banned from attending the Oscars or any other Academy event for 10 years. NBC News obtained a letter signed by David Rubin and Dawn Hudson, revealing the Board of Governors' decision effective that day, of a ten-year ban where Smith "shall not be permitted to attend any Academy events or programs, in person or virtually, including but not limited to the Academy Awards". Smith issued a succinct statement: "I accept and respect the Academy's decision."

=== Smith film delayed ===
In June 2020, it was announced that Smith starred in Emancipation, directed by Antoine Fuqua, in which he portrays Peter, a runaway slave who outsmarts hunters and the Louisiana swamp on a journey to the Union army. Apple Studios paid an estimated $120 million for the rights to the film, outbidding several other studios. However, by May 2022, the film's release was delayed to 2023, due to production issues, the controversy over Smith slapping Chris Rock, and an overcrowded film release schedule from Apple Studios. The film was eventually released in select theaters on December 2, 2022 before being released on Apple TV+ on December 9, 2022. Receiving mixed reviews from critics, the film earned a low-end $3,000 to $4,000 per location in its limited theatrical run.

=== Later responses ===
Smith appeared as a guest on the November 29, 2022 episode of The Daily Show with Trevor Noah for his first public interview since the incident. After discussing Smith's upcoming film role in Emancipation, Trevor Noah questioned Smith about his reflections since the incident. Smith responded by saying, "That was a horrific night, as you could imagine. There's many nuances and complexities to it, but at the end of the day, I just lost it. I guess what I would say is you just never know what someone's going through." Chris Rock spoke out about Smith for the first time in his Netflix stand-up comedy special Selective Outrage in March 2023, making numerous jokes about the incident.

In October 2023, Jada Pinkett Smith's memoir Worthy was released. In it she revealed that she and her husband had been separated since 2016. She described the revelation as "weight off my shoulders". Of the incident at the Oscars, she said "it's so interesting how such an intense event can bring you closer together." She said in a 2023 Parade interview, "That was a moment that I feel like we recognized once again... oh snap, we are just made for this journey together."

In June 2025, Smith appeared on British DJ Charlie Sloth's Fire in the Booth freestyle series, where he rapped a verse containing the lines: "If you talking crazy out your face up on the stage and disrespect me on the stage, expect me on the stage".

== Reactions ==
An opinion poll from YouGov conducted the day after the ceremony found that 61% of Americans said that Smith's actions were unacceptable and 22% said they were acceptable. The Federal Communications Commission, which regulates U.S. broadcasting, received 66 complaints about the incident.

SAG-AFTRA, the labor union representing film and television actors, issued a statement condemning Smith's behavior: "Violence or physical abuse in the workplace is never appropriate and the union condemns any such conduct. The incident involving Will Smith and Chris Rock at last night's Academy Awards was unacceptable. We have been in contact with the Academy of Motion Picture Arts and Sciences and ABC about this incident and will work to ensure this behavior is appropriately addressed."

=== Crew of Summer of Soul ===
Musician Questlove and film producers David Dinerstein, Robert Fyvolent, and Joseph Patel were on stage immediately after the incident to accept the Best Documentary Feature award for Summer of Soul, and some commenters opined that this award had been overshadowed by the incident. The distracted audience searched Twitter for information on Rock and Smith. Gabrielle Ulubay of Marie Claire wrote that Summer of Soul "deserved to have its moment, and Questlove's touching speech and tribute to his parents deserved to have our full attention—but instead, the world kept its mind on Will Smith and Chris Rock and its eyes on Twitter."

Questlove was asked about the incident by a reporter in a backstage press conference immediately after leaving the stage, and declined, "I'm not talking about that tonight, this is about the Harlem Cultural Festival." On The Tonight Show Starring Jimmy Fallon the next night, Questlove said he did not notice the slap in the moment because he was using Transcendental Meditation to curb his anxiety before the winner was called, and did not realize what had happened until "maybe three seconds before I spoke words".

=== Comedians ===
The incident both provided fodder for on-stage comedians and elicited serious reactions for off-stage ones. Many comedians, including George Wallace and Kathy Griffin, spoke out about how the incident had worried them about potential future confrontations, and that they might be more careful about the topics of jokes going forward. Howie Mandel connected the Rock and Dave Chappelle incidents, stating, "That [slap] opened the floodgates. You saw what happened at the Academy Awards, and I thought that ... violence triggers violence, and I think this is the beginning of the end for comedy."

In a CBS Mornings interview where comedic actor Jim Carrey was asked about the incident, he stated, "You do not have the right to walk up on stage and smack somebody in the face because they said words," and that he would have sued Smith for $200 million if he were in Rock's position, saying, "That video is going to be there forever. It's going to be ubiquitous. That insult is going to last a very long time." He further criticized the moral integrity of the Hollywood film industry for giving Smith standing ovations when receiving his Best Actor award, calling them "spineless en masse".

Comedic actor Cedric the Entertainer said in jest at an Oscars after-party that if he were assaulted during a stand-up routine for joking about someone's wife, he would defend himself. Comedian James Corden commended Rock for "keeping the show moving" and criticized Smith for not taking a joke; he poked fun at the incident on The Late Late Show with James Corden by performing a parody of the song "We Don't Talk About Bruno" about Pinkett Smith. Amy Schumer claimed she was traumatized by the incident, and criticized Smith while referring to him as "Ali". She also criticized the control the AMPAS had over the ceremony, contrasting how she was restricted from joking about Halyna Hutchins's death in the Rust shooting incident against Smith's ability to "just come up and [slap] someone".

Comedian Gilbert Gottfried's final post on social media before his death on April 12 was supportive toward Rock, asking "Which is the worst crime? Chris Rock being physically assaulted or Chris Rock telling a joke?" Late-night talk show hosts Stephen Colbert, Jimmy Kimmel, Jimmy Fallon, James Corden, Bill Maher, Andy Cohen, Seth Meyers, and Amber Ruffin all condemned Smith's actions in their monologues.

The Laugh Factory expressed its support of the First Amendment for comedians in the wake of the incident, and comedy clubs around the United States, including Stand Up NY and Carolines on Broadway, announced that they would be increasing security measures. The president of the Laugh Factory said he had noticed an increase of aggression among patrons since the businesses reopened after the COVID-19 pandemic shutdowns. The owner of the Comedy Cellar, however, expressed doubts that the attack would inspire copycats.

Bill Maher commented "Alopecia is not leukemia. We all struggle with our hair." Ricky Gervais held similar opinions, remarking sarcastically, "I'm fat and balding. I should get fucking benefits." During the next Academy Awards, host Jimmy Kimmel joked that in case of unexpected violence, his attacker would be "allowed to stay at the ceremony", "win Best Actor", and "spend the night partying while listening to 'Gettin' Jiggy wit It' at the afterparty". At the conclusion of the telecast, a board parodying workplace "days without incident" signs displayed "Number of Oscars telecast without incident", and Kimmel raised the counter to "1".

Five weeks after the incident, Dave Chappelle was performing stand-up comedy, where he was tackled onstage by an armed audience member. Chris Rock suddenly joined him onstage to joke, "Was that Will Smith?"

=== Politicians ===
Politicians worldwide publicly discussed or took a position on the incident. Australian Prime Minister Scott Morrison, reflecting on his own marriage, said that he "can understand" the reason for Smith's actions, but "that's not how you roll". In Canada, Alberta premier Jason Kenney drew criticism for using a meme of the incident to express his position on green energy policies. The New Zealand National Party used a meme of the incident to criticize the New Zealand Labour Party on Facebook, but it was swiftly deleted and disavowed by leader Christopher Luxon. Rishi Sunak, British Chancellor of the Exchequer at the time, compared himself to Will Smith, having recently had his wife Akshata Murty criticized over owning shares in a tech company based in Russia, but humorously remarked "At least I didn't get up and slap anybody".

In the United States, Democratic representatives Ayanna Pressley and Jamaal Bowman tweeted in support of Smith, both of which were later deleted. Pressley, who has been diagnosed with alopecia areata, said that the condition is "not a line in a joke". Pressley also tweeted in defense of Smith, saying "Shout out to all the husbands who defend their wives living with alopecia in the face of daily ignorance & insults." and added "Women with baldies are for real men only ... boys need not apply." The tweet was later deleted. Several Republican Party representatives, including Marjorie Taylor Greene, also voiced support for Smith's actions, and Representative Andy Biggs used the incident to create anti-Biden memes.

=== Accusations of staging ===
Some commentators suspected the altercation was a publicity stunt, due in part to waning viewership numbers for recent years. David Griner from Adweek tweeted: "A slow walk up, an open hand slap, no stagger, slow walk back with no scuffle and no security personnel stepping in? Feels absolutely staged for publicity," and several others agreed. Rumors of the slap being staged were fueled by a version of the image that was digitally manipulated to create the illusion that Rock was wearing a cheek pad, which was then debunked. Academy sources confirmed that the incident was not planned and that Rock's joke was ad-libbed.

=== Views on criminality ===
The LAPD reported that Rock did not wish to file a police report. Former Los Angeles County prosecutor Alan Jackson believed that charges would not be pursued so long as Rock did not participate.

However, former federal prosecutor Neama Rahmani explained that the idea of "pressing charges" is a legal misconception, and that the choice was ultimately up to the office of Los Angeles City Attorney Mike Feuer. Criminal defense lawyer Alison Triessl echoed these sentiments, saying, "I would [be] surprised if the city attorney does not seriously consider [charges] because it was so public ... Are they sending the wrong message if they don't prosecute him? [...] It sends a message that you can commit a crime and you won't be punished. This was a very wrong message." Chief legal analyst Aron Solomon of Esquire Digital, wrote, "It is clear that what happened at the Oscars was an assault under the California statutory definition." Tarek Fatah wrote in The Toronto Sun, "Of the two men in the discussion, only one of them broke the law at the Oscars and got away with it because the LAPD stood back and let it happen ... Only when Will Smith is charged with assault and battery will it show that justice is blind". Jody Armour, a law professor at the University of Southern California, argued, "If Smith is not charged, it could imperil the justice system's credibility".

Other legal experts argued against charges. Alan Jackson said, "To be arrested on a misdemeanor, it has to happen in front of the authorities, or conversely the person against whom the crime was allegedly committed has to file a formal complaint with police". Loyola Law School professor and former federal prosecutor Laurie Levenson said that the case was not serious enough to merit being treated as a priority; defense attorney and former prosecutor Michael Cardoza agreed, saying that though Smith's actions did constitute a crime, "it's not significant enough to clog our courts". Defense attorney Lou Shapiro argued that Smith was not being given any special treatment by not being arrested, stating, "On a simple battery with no injury, LAPD is not deviating from the norm on this one. Unless it's a domestic violence case, they're more likely not going to use resources on it, because if the victim is not going to pursue charges, then who are we protecting at this point?" Experts consulted by the Associated Press agreed that Smith would be unlikely to face charges at all.

=== Memes ===
The public's reaction eventually morphed from shock to satire and meme. Media outlets referred to the altercation, from the shot heard round the world, as "the slap heard around the world". Others referred to it as "Slapgate". A few journalists preferred "The Slappening". Countless Internet memes and parodies were created from the photo and video, a notable amount referencing their roles in DreamWorks Animation's movies Shark Tale (2004) and Madagascar (2005): Smith as Oscar in the former and Pinkett Smith and Rock as Gloria and Marty in the latter. The photo was integrated into a mural by Eme Freethinker on a remaining section of the Berlin Wall in Mauerpark.

Saturday Night Live's Weekend Update discussed the way the Academy handled the incident, with Colin Jost quipping, "So now we just ask the victim right after they get hit in the head? 'Hey, are you cool if the guy who just attacked you hangs around for a while? You don't want to make him mad again.'"

== Analysis ==
=== Potential causes ===
Monica Hesse, author and columnist for The Washington Post, characterized the act of violence as a misguided attempt at chivalry. Glamour magazine's Ateh Jewel characterized it as "a chivalrous act loaded with toxic masculinity". Duke University James B. Duke Distinguished Professor of African and African American Studies, Mark Anthony Neal, commented that the incident reflected upon societal values related to perceptions of race and African American masculinity in American media.

Monash University professor at the School of Education Culture and Society, Steven Roberts, agreed that the incident belonged within the larger context of toxic masculinity. Roberts concluded that this was "another timely reminder that we need to invest in and promote forms of masculinity that are premised on democratic gender relations that centre on empathy and care". University of Southern California professor and executive director of the USC Race and Equity Center, Shaun Harper, further elaborated on the incident as an example of toxic masculinity, emphasizing, "Will Smith is 53 years old, which confirms that toxic masculinity is not about immaturity. It is not a thing that men naturally grow out of. Some of us embody aspects of it our entire lives. Understanding what it is and how it shows up in our attitudes and behaviors might just save us from inflicting harm on ourselves and others."

Harvard Medical School psychologist Anna Precht supposed, "In a cooler, calmer moment, [Smith] would acknowledge that a joke is not actually a threat." Author Bernardine Evaristo lamented that, with so few African American winners of Academy Awards, Will Smith "resorts to violence instead of utilizing the power of words".

In a collaborative academic analysis of the incident, Monash University professors Steven Zech, Beatriz Gallo Cordoba, Lucas Walsh, and Matteo Bonotti, concluded, "Violence (also a form of incivility) is unacceptable, but civility, and when and how to enact it, is complicated. Sometimes it may be better to be impolite and not smile, if we want to promote change."

Chris Rock and others widely speculated that Smith's assault was influenced by his possibly lingering agitation about his wife's previous and intense four-year extramarital affair with their son's friend August Alsina, who is 21 years her junior. The Smiths unanimously concluded that theirs is a "bad marriage for life".

=== Comparisons with historic Academy incidents ===
In a column for Glamour magazine, Jenny Singer contrasted the cases of Smith and French–Polish director Roman Polanski. Polanski has been a fugitive from American justice since 1978, after fleeing the country just hours before he was due to be sentenced for drugging and raping a thirteen-year-old girl. Singer observed that the Academy did not expel Polanski until forty years later, in the wake of the MeToo movement; and that, until his expulsion, the acting fraternity in Hollywood enthusiastically supported the director, including a standing ovation at the 2003 ceremony upon winning Best Director for The Pianist (2002). By contrast, Smith was banned after only two weeks.

Writing for The Guardian, Tayo Bero also described the treatment of Smith as "inequality in plain sight", and noted that the Academy took no action over the furor at the 1973 ceremony where John Wayne allegedly had to be restrained by six security guards to prevent him from assaulting Sacheen Littlefeather, an activist for Native American civil rights. However, a 2022 investigation found that Wayne's alleged behavior was an urban legend and had never happened.

=== Financial impact ===
Olin Business School at the Washington University in St. Louis professors Tim Solberg and Glenn MacDonald agreed that it was unlikely the incident would have significant financial impacts on the earnings power of either Smith or Rock, but could have negative impacts for the Academy of Motion Picture Arts and Sciences organization. Solberg said, "The Academy itself may suffer damage if it does not take action. ... The two stars have their followings and the audience is segmented. They will probably not have a drop in earnings as a result. In that sense, their brand is not harmed financially." MacDonald agreed, observing, "In entertainment, they often say there is no such thing as bad publicity." Solberg noted there could be a financial impact to Smith if the major film studios took action: "While financially, the stars have their brand and their following, unless a studio boycotts or the public cancels Will Smith—a major box office star making money for the company—due to the public show of violence, he will maintain his financial draw even if his brand is tarnished."

Rock seemed to financially benefit from the incident when his comedy tour sold out. One secondary ticket seller had a 641% increase in the following days, and some tickets were auctioned for more than US$1,700.

== See also ==
- List of "-gate" scandals and controversies
- Assault on Bret Hart
- Kanye West–Taylor Swift incident
- Miley Cyrus–Robin Thicke performance
- Media circus
- Super Bowl XXXVIII halftime show controversy
- Elon Musk salute controversy
