= Titu Maiorescu =

Romanian literary critic and politician (1840 - 1917)

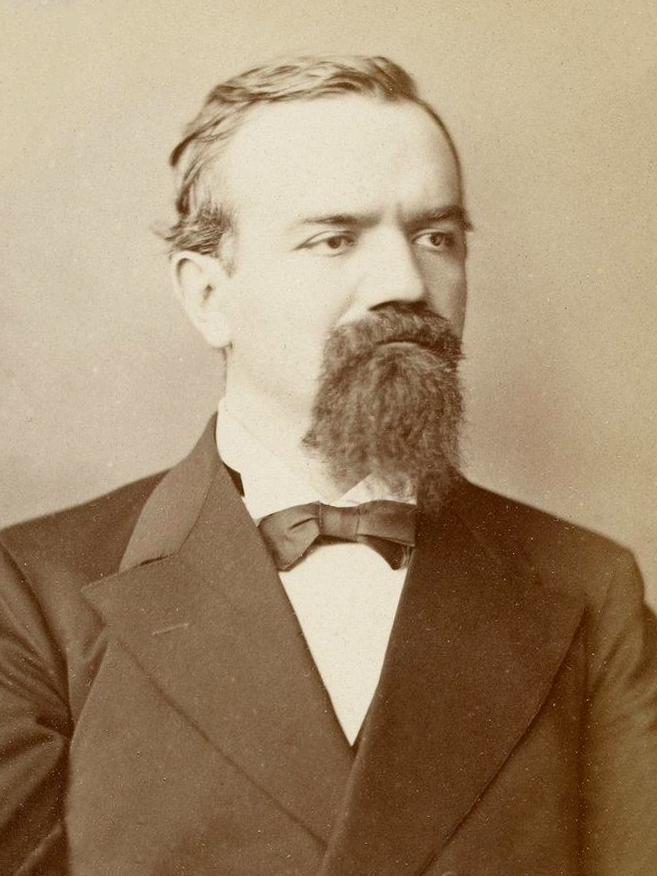
- Titu Maiorescu in 1882

22nd Prime Minister of Romania
- In office 28 March 1912 – 31 December 1913
- Monarch: Carol I
- Preceded by: Petre P. Carp
- Succeeded by: Ion I. C. Brătianu

Minister of Foreign Affairs
- In office 29 December 1910 – 4 January 1914
- Preceded by: Alexandru Djuvara
- Succeeded by: Emanoil Porumbaru

Personal details
- Born: 15 February 1840 Craiova, Wallachia
- Died: 18 June 1917 (aged 77) Bucharest, Romania
- Party: Conservative Party

Titu Liviu Maiorescu (Romanian: [ˈtitu majoˈresku]; 15 February 1840 – 18 June 1917) was a Romanian literary critic, politician and founder of the Junimea Society. As a literary critic, he was instrumental in the development of Romanian culture in the second half of the 19th century.

A member of the Conservative Party, he was Foreign Minister between 1910 and 1914 and Prime Minister of Romania from 1912 to 1913. He represented Romania at the Peace Conference in Bucharest that ended the Second Balkan War. In politics as in culture, he favoured Germany over France. He opposed Romania's entry in World War I against Germany, but he nevertheless refused to collaborate with the German army after it had occupied Bucharest.

== Biography ==
Titu Liviu Maiorescu was born in Craiova, on 15 February 1840. Maiorescu's mother, born Maria Popazu, was the sister of the scholar and bishop of Caransebeș, Ioan Popazu. The family Popazu came from Vălenii de Munte. His father, Ioan Maiorescu, was the son of a Transylvanian peasant from Bucerdea Grânoasă and his surname was actually Trifu, but he adopted Maiorescu in order to emphasize his kinship with Petru Maior.

A theologian by trade (having studied in Blaj, Budapest, and Vienna), Ioan Maiorescu proved to be a free thinker. He taught in Cernăuți, Craiova, Iași, and Bucharest, and remained a prominent figure of the era for his devotion to the Romanian modern educational system. Ioan Maiorescu became an inspector for the schools of Oltenia. Later he worked as a teacher at the National College of Carol I, the Central School of Craiova.

During the Revolution of 1848, Ioan Maiorescu strengthened ties between Wallachian and Transylvanian revolutionaries while serving as an agent of the Interim Government near the German Dieta in Frankfurt. Meanwhile, his family, consisting of his wife, Maria, born Popasu, and his two children, Emilia and Titu, traveled to Bucharest, Brașov, Sibiu and Blaj.

The family stayed in Brașov for a while, and there the future critic attended the fifth grade at the Romanian gymnasium. Settling in Vienna, Ioan Maiorescu wrote articles in a number of Austrian newspapers concerning Romania and Romanians. Returning to Romania after the Union, he became president of the Obșteasca Epitropie (The Public Trusteeship). Thereafter, he worked as director of the Central Commission of the United Principalities. This was followed by a position as a teacher at the Saint Sava National College, and as director of Public Instruction Eforie. He then became a teacher at the Superior School of Letters in Bucharest.

=== Childhood ===
Between 1846 and 1848, Titu Maiorescu attended the primary school in Craiova. During the days of the revolution his father Ioan was sent on a mission to Frankfurt am Main. Meanwhile, his mother, Maria Maiorescu, traveled with the children to Bucharest, Brașov, and then Sibiu. This must have been a very disconcerting time for the young Titu. In December 1848, under the care of Avram Iancu, the family arrived after more dislocation in Blaj and finally in Braşov. Titu Maiorescu was then at last able to continue his primary school education. From 1848 until 1850, he attended Protodeacon Iosif Barac's School.

Between 1850 and 1851, after finishing primary school, Titu Maiorescu was enrolled at the Romanian Gymnasium in Schei-Braşov, a gymnasium grammar school founded in 1850 by his uncle Ioan Popazu. He studied there up until the fifth grade. At the gymnasium in Brașov, he met Anton Pann, who left him with an indelible impression.

=== At Theresianum Academy ===
In September 1851, the Maiorescu family settled in Vienna, where Titu's father was working within the Ministry of Justice. Later in October, Titu Maiorescu attended the first grade at the Academic Gymnasium. This was an addendum of the Theresianum Academy for foreigners. A month later, the school authorities recognized his results from the gymnasium in Brașov and so he was able to pass comfortably on to the next grade.

While attending the academy in Vienna, Maiorescu began to write his Însemnărilor zilnice (Daily Journal) which he kept until July 1917. These 42 notebooks currently belong today to the collection of manuscripts in the Romanian Academic Library. Titu continued to write his journal until the end of his life. His notes provide insight into his personality. His success from 1858, when he graduated first in his class at the Theresianum Academy, was an indication of all his efforts and strong will.

=== University studies ===
Maiorescu was very eager to obtain his university degree. After only one year of studies in Berlin, he obtained his PhD at Giessen, magna cum laude, and then after a year, he received his licence at the Philology and Philosophy University of Sorbona. One year later, after he had studied at the University of Paris, he took his licence in law. However, his eagerness did not affect his demureness in his studies; the foundations of Maiorescu's extremely solid culture were established during this period.

On 3 January 1857, he sent an essay signed with the name Aureliu to the Transylvania Gazette in order to publish some of his translations from Jean Paul's works. In the following number he also intended to publish the translation of a short story written by Jean Paul and entitled New Year's Eve Night. Although the translation was not published at that time, the letter that Aurel A. Mureşianu edited later in the Gazette of books, no 1, in 1934 is considered as the first publishing attempt of T. Maiorescu. It was republished under the same title. In 1858, to support his academic activity, he worked as a teacher of psychology in private boarding schools and as a French teacher in the house of a legal counselor named Georg Kremnitz.

As a preparatory teacher in the French language for the Kremnitz household, Titu Maiorescu taught all of the family's four children, including Klara (his future wife). There was also Helene, Wilhelm (future Dr. W. Kremnitz, Mite Kremnitz's husband, born Marie von Bardeleben) and Hermann. Titu Maiorescu got his PhD in philosophy at Giessen, magna cum laude. Giessen University amiably recognized his last two years at Theresianum which could count as a part of his PhD studies. When he returned to Romania, he published the article "The Measure of Height through a Barometer" in the review Isis or Nature.

=== PhD ===
In December 1860, he received his license in Philology and Philosophy at Sorbonne due to the acknowledgment of his doctorate from Giessen. The following year Maiorescu published his philosophical essay entitled Philosophical Considerations for Everybody's Understanding (German: Einiges Philosophische in gemeinfasslicher Form) in Berlin, obviously under the influence of Herbart's and Feuerbach's ideas. On 17 December, after they considered the value of the essay, and after "a verbal defense in front of the academic committee, brilliantly held for original opinions", the Sorbonne committee granted him the title of "licencé ès lettres" (Philology Licensed). Maiorescu then prepared his doctoral thesis, entitled The Relation. Essay on a new foundation of philosophy (French: La relation. Essai d'un nouveau fondement de la philosophie), until the end of the year 1861, when he left France.

=== Career as a university teacher ===
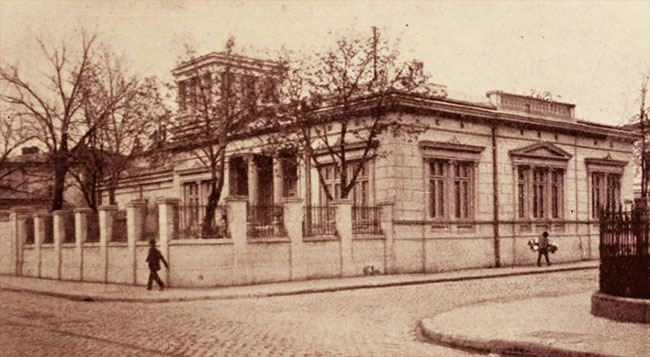
The Neoclassical house where Titu Maiorescu lived in Bucharest, at the intersection of Strada Arthur Verona (formerly Strada Mercur) and Strada Nicolae Golescu. The house was demolished in the late 1950s or early 1960s to make space for the Eva and the ONT apartment buildings

In the summer of 1862, he was assigned as a substitute lawyer at the Law Courts to then become an attorney. His financial income enabled him to marry his pupil, Clara Kremnitz. In November/December he became a teacher at the University of Iași and principal of the Central Gymnasium in the same town.

In 1863 Maiorescu was assigned to teach a university course of history. His subject-area had the elaborate title of: About the History of the Roman Republic from the Introduction of Plebeian Tribunes until the Death of Julius Caesar Especially Regarding the Economical and Political Progress”. From February until September, he was the Dean of the Philosophy Faculty of the University of Iași. On 18 September 1863, he was elected as rector of the University of Iaşi for a period of four years. This must have eased his financial considerations enabling him and his wife to live comfortably.

In the following October, he was assigned as principal of the school "Vasile Lupu" in Iași. There he taught pedagogy, Romanian grammar, psychology and composition. For the first time in Romania, he was able to initiate the Pedagogic Practice for pupils. One of these pupils was Ion Creangă.

In 1863 Titu Maiorescu published in Iași the "Yearbook of the Gymnasium and the Boarding School from Iași for the School Year 1862–1863". The yearbook was preceded by his thesis: "Why Should the Latin Language be Studied in a Gymnasium as Part of the Foundation of Moral Education?” On 28 March Titu Maiorescu's daughter, Livia, was born. She later married Dymsza; she died in 1946. On 8 October Titu Maiorescu was elected to lead the Institute Vasilian from Iași, which needed to be "fundamentally reorganized." In order to complete this mission, commissioned by the Minister of Public Directions, Alexandru Odobescu, he travelled on a documentary journey to Berlin. Later he returned to Iași on 4 January 1864.

Between 1863 and 1864, Titu Maiorescu taught philosophy at the Philology University of Iași where, as a result of his experiences in Berlin and due to his engagement with the ideas of Feuerbach, he began to show his pro-German cultural outlook.

=== Involvement in social life ===
On 10 March 1861, Titu Maiorescu held a lecture (Die alte französische Tragödie und die Wagnersche Musik — „The Old French Tragedy and Wagner's Music”) in Berlin for the benefit of the monument of Lessing from Kamenz. He repeated the lecture on 12 April in Paris at the "Cercle des sociétés savantes" (Circle of Academic Societies) and later renewed it in the form of a communicative epistle, on 27 April in Berlin, at the Philosophy Society.

On 28 November 1861, Maiorescu obtained his Law Licence in Paris. He had based his studies on the thesis "Du régime dotal" ("On Dowery Law"). On 10 December he began his lecture cycle on "Education Within the Family". Afterwards he went back to Romania and settled in Bucharest.

When he returned there in late December towards the end of 1861, Titu Maiorescu was eager to contribute to the progress of the recently formed state, especially after the Union of 1859. This brought the nation's cultural and political life onto a European level. At that time when the Union was proclaimed personalities with fresh energy and a cultured outlook were very much needed, particularly among those who were educated in Western Universities so as to lend Romania a Western orientation.

As a result of his successful education and adoption of Western ideas, Titu Maiorescu had an early ascent into prominence. During his youth, he had been a university professor at just 22 years of age while in Iași. He became a dean at 23 and a rector at the same age. Then he became an academic member of the Romanian Academic Society at 27, and a deputy at 30. By the age of 34 he was a minister. But this ascent wasn't always smooth and without hardship. On one occasion, he was once sued because of all the calumnies that his political opponents had promoted against him. Consequently, he was suspended from all his functions in 1864, but the verdict of discharge the following year proved groundless and so further accusations against him withered away.

With his reputation restored Maiorescu would become a member of the Macedo-Romanian Cultural Society.

=== Foundation of the Junimea Society ===
The 1860s were for Maiorescu the period of "popular prelections" (lectures on various problems addressed to quite large audiences). During this decade he participated in the foundation of the Junimea Society. He founded it alongside his friends I. Negruzzi, Petre P. Carp, V. Pogor and Th.Rosetti. He started his work as a lawyer and was thereafter elected principal of the "School Vasile Lupu" in Iași. Later he founded the review Convorbiri Literare in 1867.

Although the period that followed after the Union of 1859 represented an epoch of completion, namely through the ideals of the generation of 1848, the political accent still needed to be changed. Indeed, conditions were different from the romantic youth of Heliade Rădulescu, Alecsandri or Bălcescu. Maiorescu was representing the new generation, the Junimist Generation, which had a new conception on social and Romanian cultural life.

Regarding political ideology, Maiorescu was a retentionist, an advocate of a natural, organic and well prepared evolution. He was an adversary of the "forms without root". He presented his indictment in his article from 1868 entitled Against the present direction in Romanian culture, in which he criticized the implementation of certain institutions which appeared in inmitation of Western ones and which in his view had no appropriate root corresponding to the mentality, creation and cultural legacy of the Romanian people.

=== Work as a literary critic ===
The beginnings of Maiorescu's literary critic activity stand apart from the previous generation. Unlike the years before the revolution of 1848, when an intense need of original literature was determined by Heliade Rădulescu to address enthusiastic appeals for Romanian literary works, the seventh decade of the 19th century was marked by a large number of poets and prosaic authors who had very limited artistical devices, but were blessed with high ideals and pretences.

It was a time when the selection of true values was needed, on the basis of certain aesthetic criteria Maiorescu agreed to accomplish that task. The adversaries of his ideas depreciatively called his action „a judicial criticism“ because his studies and articles did not analyse in detail the literary work that they had discussed - nor looked at the many apothegms within it. These are based on an ample culture, a determined artistic taste and on impressive intuitions.

However, the mentor of the Junimea Society considered this type of criticism (neatly affirmative or negative) necessary only to that epoch of clutter of values, as its modalities of execution would gradate later, in the literary life, when the great writers would elevate the artistic level and implicitly would have the public's exigency augmented.

Maiorescu's work as a tutor, as fighter for the assertion of values, would dominate the remainder of his entire life that would be divided between his political activity (he would become prime minister, but would lose the friend that was his youth, P.P. Carp), and his University activity. As a professor he had promoted disciples of great value, like C. Rădulescu-Motru, P.P. Negulescu, Pompiliu Eliade and others. In addition, there was his lawyer activity and his prominence as a literary critic.

Maiorescu was often critiscized for not spending satisfactory time writing literary works, depite being one of the most influential literary critics of his time, marking a new period of Romanian Literature: the period of the great classics. The role of the Junimea Society and of Maiorescu himself who is linked to the creation and the assertion in the public's conscience of writers like Eminescu, Creangă, Caragiale, Slavici, Duiliu Zamfirescu and others.

Frequently criticized for appearing detached, passionless, and distant (a trait summarized by N. Iorga's comment: "Nobody was warm or cold beside him."), Maiorescu sought support and friendship from his financial and professional circles, including the benevolence of Junimea writers and his disciples. His critic Dobrogeanu-Gherea was also generous enough to support his character. In addition, his correspondence with Mihai Eminescu during the poet's stay at the Ober-Döbling sanatorium, where Maiorescu reassured him regarding medical fees, demonstrated personal care and concern as revealed through Maiorescu's open address to his friend cited below:

"Do you want to know where the means to pay your fees come from for now? Well, Mr. Eminescu, are we such strangers to each other? Don't you know the love (if you allow me to use this exact word, although it is stronger than other words), the often enthusiastic admiration that I and our entire literary circle feels for you, for your poems, for your whole literary and political work? But it was a real explosion of love that we (all your friends and only these) contributed to through the support of the few material needs that your situation requires. And you would have done the same in using the large or small sum you had when any of your friends would have needed help, so we cannot forget a friend of your great value".
