= Ayanna Pressley =

American politician (born 1974)

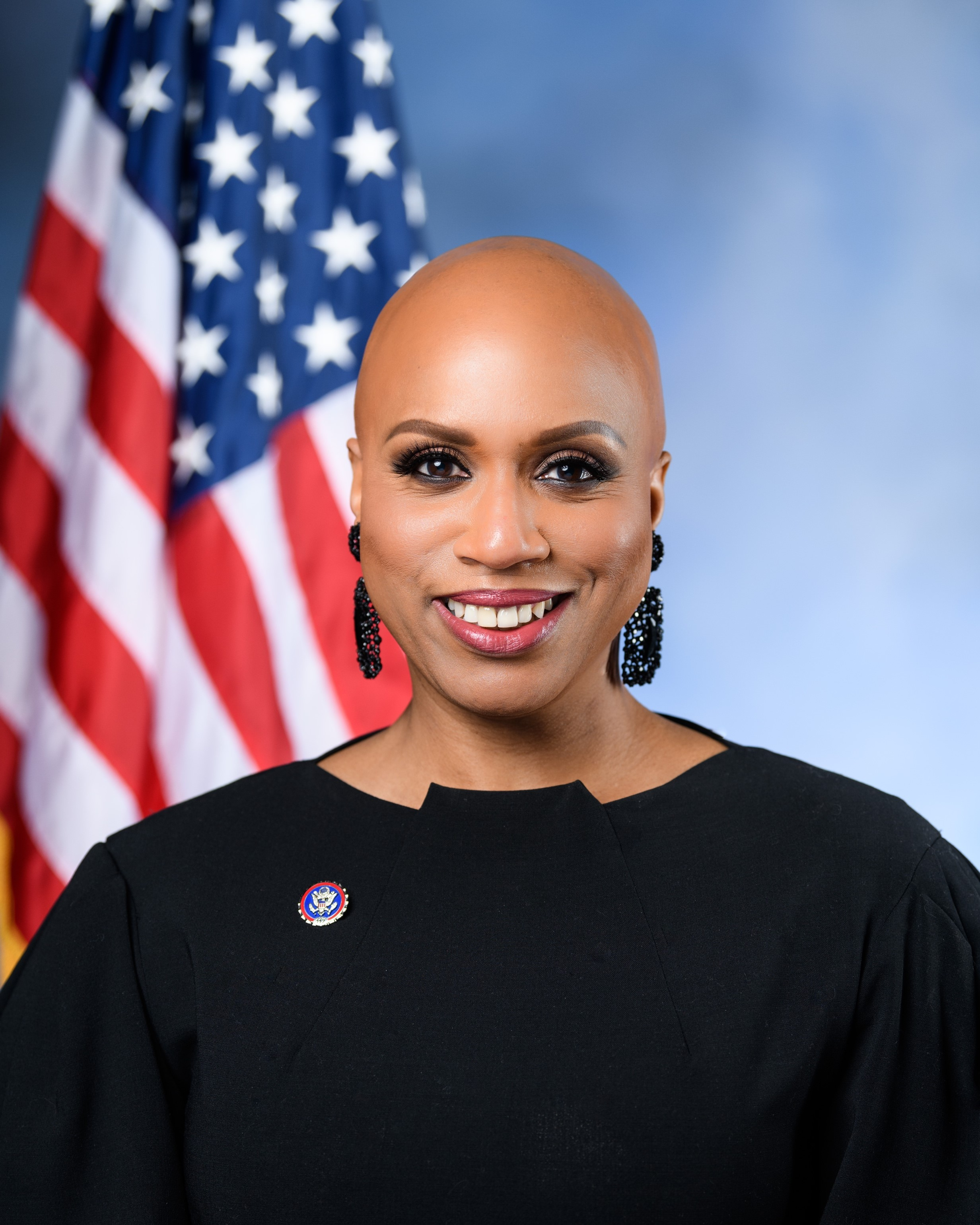
- Official portrait, 2021

Member of the U.S. House of Representatives from Massachusetts's 7th district
- Incumbent
- Assumed office January 3, 2019
- Preceded by: Mike Capuano

Member of the Boston City Council from the at-large district
- In office January 4, 2010 – January 3, 2019
- Preceded by: Michael F. Flaherty; Sam Yoon
- Succeeded by: Althea Garrison

Personal details
- Born: Ayanna Soyini Pressley; February 3, 1974 (age 52) Cincinnati, Ohio, U.S.
- Party: Democratic
- Spouse: Conan Harris (m. 2014)
- Children: 1 stepdaughter
- Education: Boston University (attended)
- Website: House website Campaign website
- Pressley's voice Pressley endorsing Katjana Ballantyne for Mayor of Somerville. Recorded October 2021

Ayanna Soyini Pressley (born February 3, 1974) is an American politician who has served as the U.S. representative for Massachusetts's 7th congressional district since 2019. This district includes the northern three quarters of Boston, most of Cambridge, parts of Milton, as well as all of Chelsea, Everett, Randolph, and Somerville.

Pressley served as an at-large member of the Boston City Council from 2010 through 2019. She was elected to the United States House of Representatives in 2018 after she defeated the ten-term incumbent Mike Capuano in the Democratic primary election for Massachusetts's 7th congressional district and ran unopposed in the general election. Pressley was the first black woman elected to the Boston City Council and the first Black woman elected to Congress from Massachusetts. Pressley is a member of "The Squad", an informal group of progressive members of Congress.

== Early life and education ==
Pressley was born in Cincinnati, Ohio, and raised in Chicago, Illinois. Her father, Martin Terrell, struggled with addiction and was incarcerated throughout Pressley's childhood, but eventually earned multiple degrees and taught at the college level. Her mother, Sandra Pressley (née Echols), worked multiple jobs to support the family and also worked as a community organizer for the Chicago Urban League advocating for tenants' rights. The marriage ended in divorce. Pressley grew up on the north side of Chicago and attended Francis W. Parker School, where she was a cheerleader, did modeling and voice-over work, appeared in Planned Parenthood bus advertisements, and was a competitive debater. During her senior year of high school, she was voted the "most likely to be mayor of Chicago" and was the commencement speaker for her class.

Pressley's mother later moved to Brooklyn, where she worked as an executive assistant and remarried. When Pressley was elected to the Boston City Council, her mother would often attend the public meetings, wearing a hat that said "Mama Pressley".

From 1992 to 1994, Pressley attended the College of General Studies at Boston University, before leaving school to take a full-time job at the Boston Marriott Copley Place to support her mother, who had lost her job. She took further courses at Boston University Metropolitan College.

Pressley has publicly recounted having been a survivor of a "near decade of childhood sexual abuse". She has also publicly recounted surviving a sexual assault on the campus of Boston University while a student there.

== Early political career ==
After dropping out of Boston University Metropolitan College, Pressley worked as a district representative for Representative Joseph P. Kennedy II (D−MA), for whom she had interned during college. She became Kennedy's scheduler, then worked as constituency director, before becoming the political director and senior aide for Senator John Kerry (D-Mass.) In 2009, Pressley served as Kerry's political director.

== Boston City Council ==
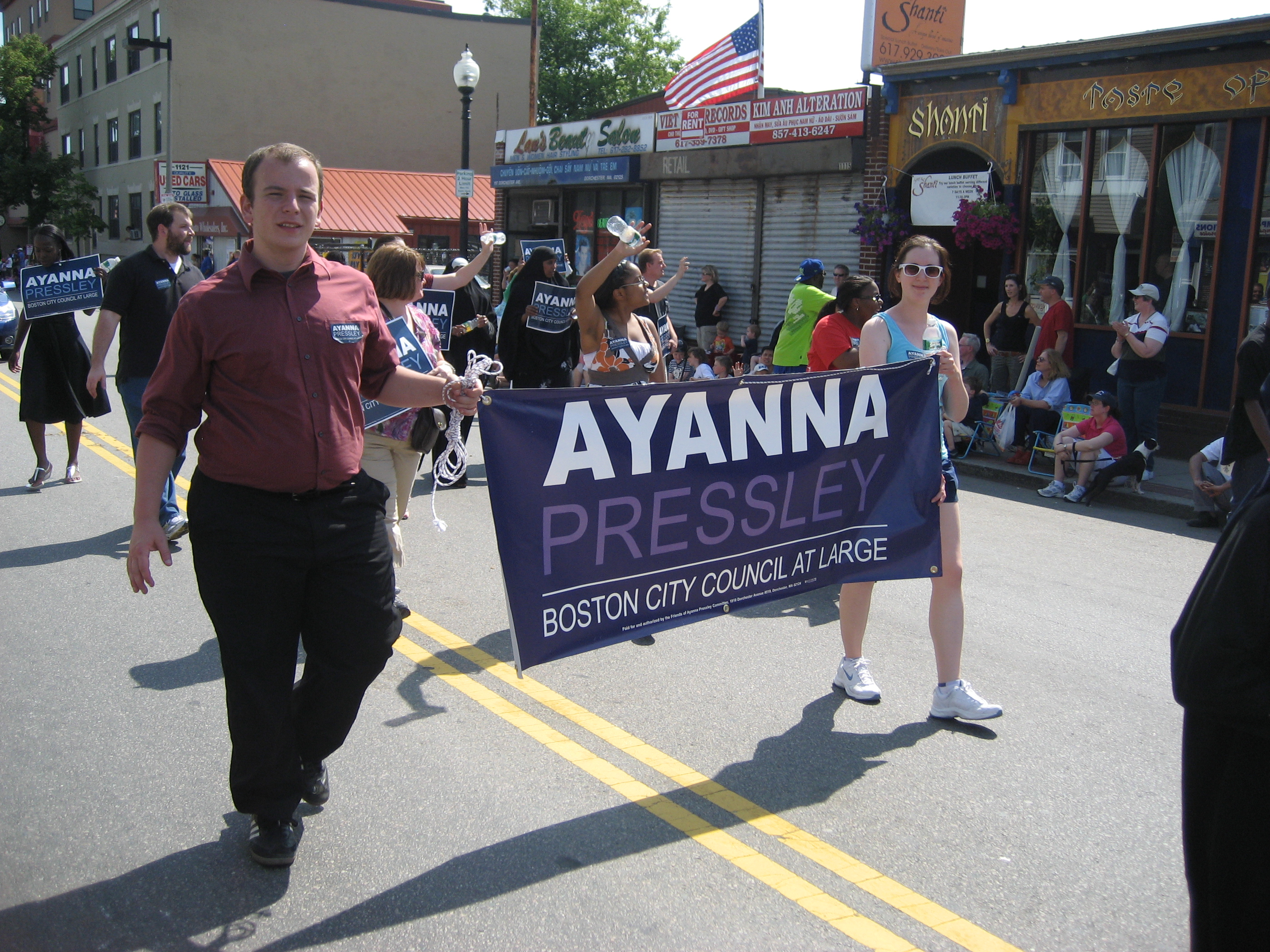
Supporters of Pressley's 2009 Boston City Council campaign march in the 2009 Dorchester Day Parade

Pressley was first elected to the Boston City Council in November 2009. Upon being sworn in on January 4, 2010, she was the first woman of color to serve in the 100-year history of the Boston City Council.

Pressley placed a strong focus on women's and children's issues. Pressley founded the Committee on Healthy Women, Families, and Communities, which addresses issues such as domestic violence, child abuse, and human trafficking. She worked collaboratively with community members to develop a comprehensive sex education and health curriculum which was implemented in Boston Public Schools.

In June 2014, the Boston City Council unanimously passed an ordinance Pressley coauthored with Councilor Michelle Wu, which prohibits its city government "from contracting with any health insurer that denies coverage or 'discriminates in the amount of premium, policy fees, or rates charged...because of gender identity or expression". This ordinance guaranteed healthcare (including gender reassignment surgery, hormone therapy, and mental health services) to transgender city employees and their dependents. Pressley declared, "We can't be a world-class city if anyone is made to feel like a second-class citizen."

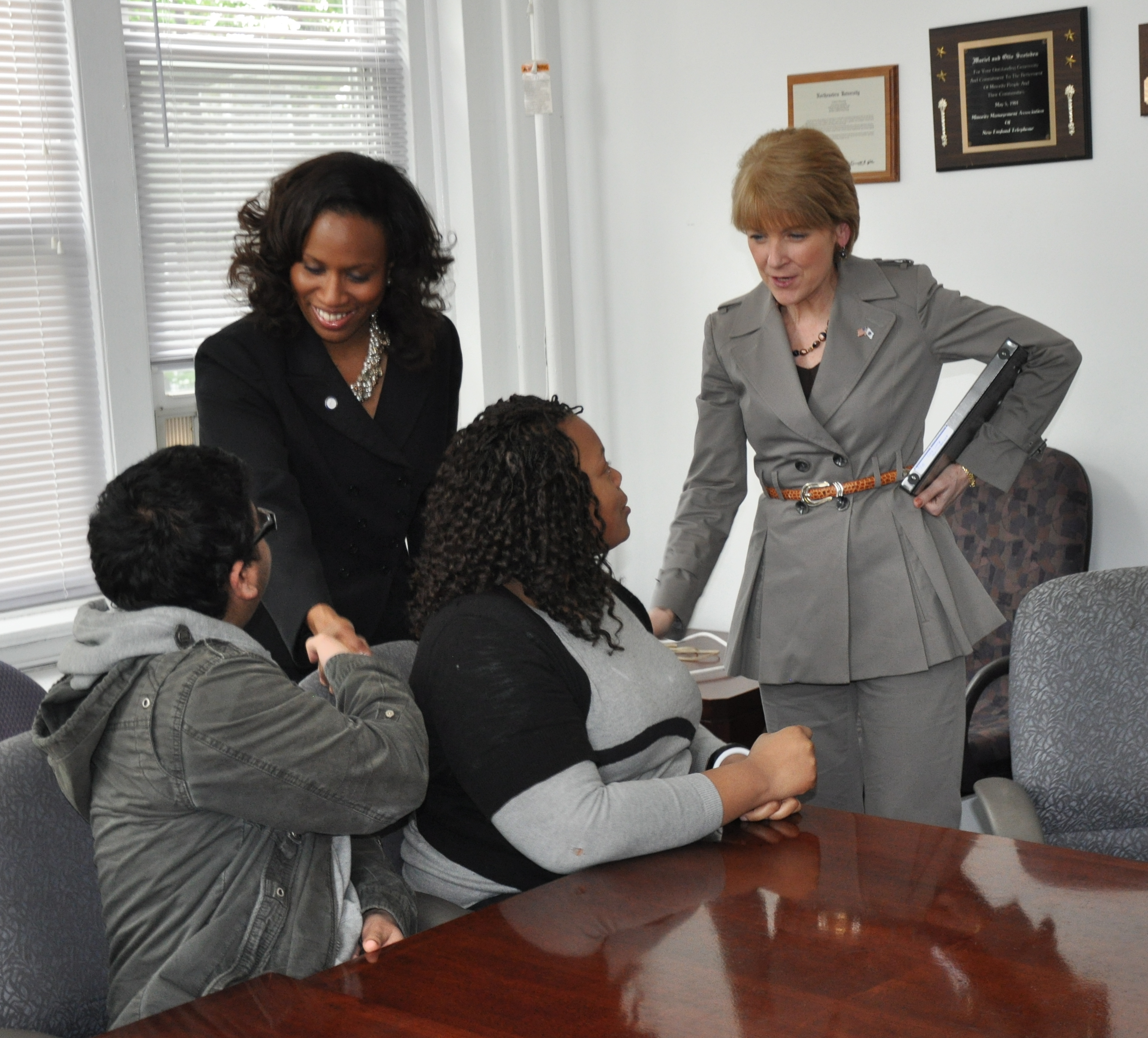
Pressley attends a 2011 event alongside Massachusetts Attorney General Martha Coakley.

Pressley worked on the issue of liquor licenses in the city. The ultimate product of Pressley's push was the passage of state legislation in 2014 granting Boston the authority to distribute 75 additional liquor licenses over three years, with the aim of distributing them to less advantaged neighborhoods to increase economic activity in those neighborhoods. However, The Boston Globe's Meghan Irons observed that an unintentional impact of this was that, "it created uneven competition. It left out certain neighborhoods. It allowed businesses that were already established to get the licenses." Nevertheless, in 2018, The New York Times called Pressley's work on the matter a "major accomplishment". To remedy the shortfalls, Pressley worked with Mayor Walsh to further expand the number of new available liquor licenses. In 2017, Pressley and Mayor Walsh unveiled a proposal to increase the number of liquor licenses in the city by 152 over three years, with the majority of licenses being granted to underserved communities.

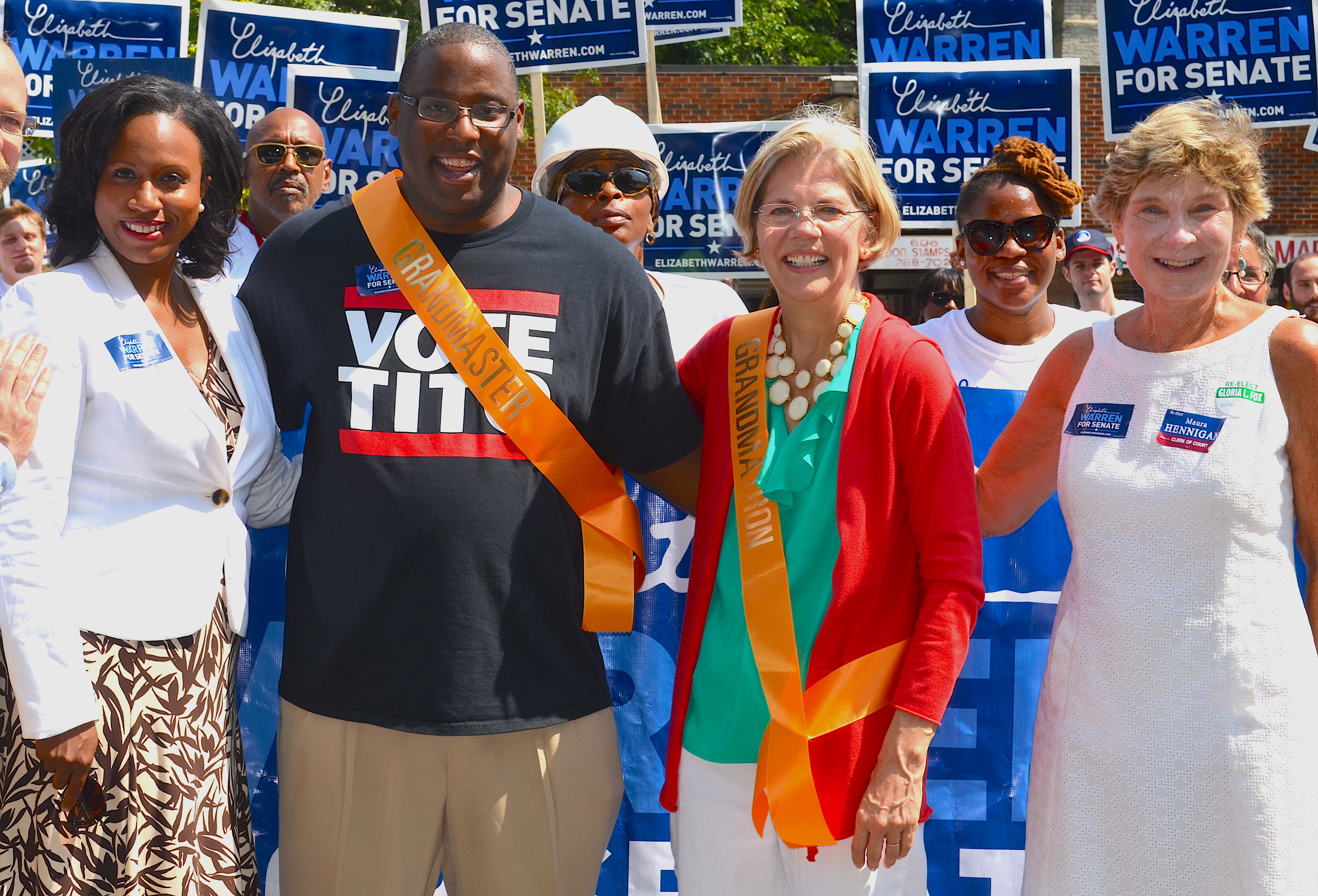
Pressley (far left) with fellow city councilor Tito Jackson, Democratic U.S. Senate nominee Elizabeth Warren, and Suffolk County Clerk of Courts Criminal Business Maura Hennigan at the Boston Caribbean Carnival parade in August 2012

In 2017, the Council passed the Equity in City of Boston Contracts Ordinance, which was sponsored by Pressley and Councilor Michelle Wu. It required that the city create a supplier diversity program to conduct outreach to female and minority-owned businesses in regards to the city's contracting process. It also required the city to actively solicit bids from at least one female-owned business and one minority-owned business for contracts under $50,000. It also created a quarterly reporting requirement for the city.

According to Erin O'Brien, a political science professor at University of Massachusetts Boston, Pressley did not have the reputation for being controversial or an outsider during her time on the City Council. O'Brien, in 2018, observed that the city's "old guard" viewed Pressley as a "showboat" but that, "in many communities of color, she is viewed as incredibly exciting and voicing issues the council has ignored."

In the Boston City Council election of November 2011, Pressley finished first among at-large candidates with 37,000 votes. She led in 13 of the city's 22 wards and finished second in three others. Pressley won Boston's communities of color and many progressive neighborhoods. In all, she placed first in more than half of Boston's 22 wards. Pressley placed first ticket again in November 2013 and November 2015, and placed second in November 2017 behind only Michelle Wu.

While on the Boston City Council, Pressley was one of the first notable Massachusetts politicians to endorse Elizabeth Warren's successful campaign in Massachusetts' 2012 U.S. Senate election. Pressley would later endorse Warren's 2020 presidential campaign.

== U.S. House of Representatives ==
=== Elections ===
==== 2018 ====
2018 Democratic primary results by precinct: Pressley: 50–60%; 60–70%; 70–80%; 80–90%; 90–100%; Capuano: 50–60%; 60–70%; 70–80%; No votes

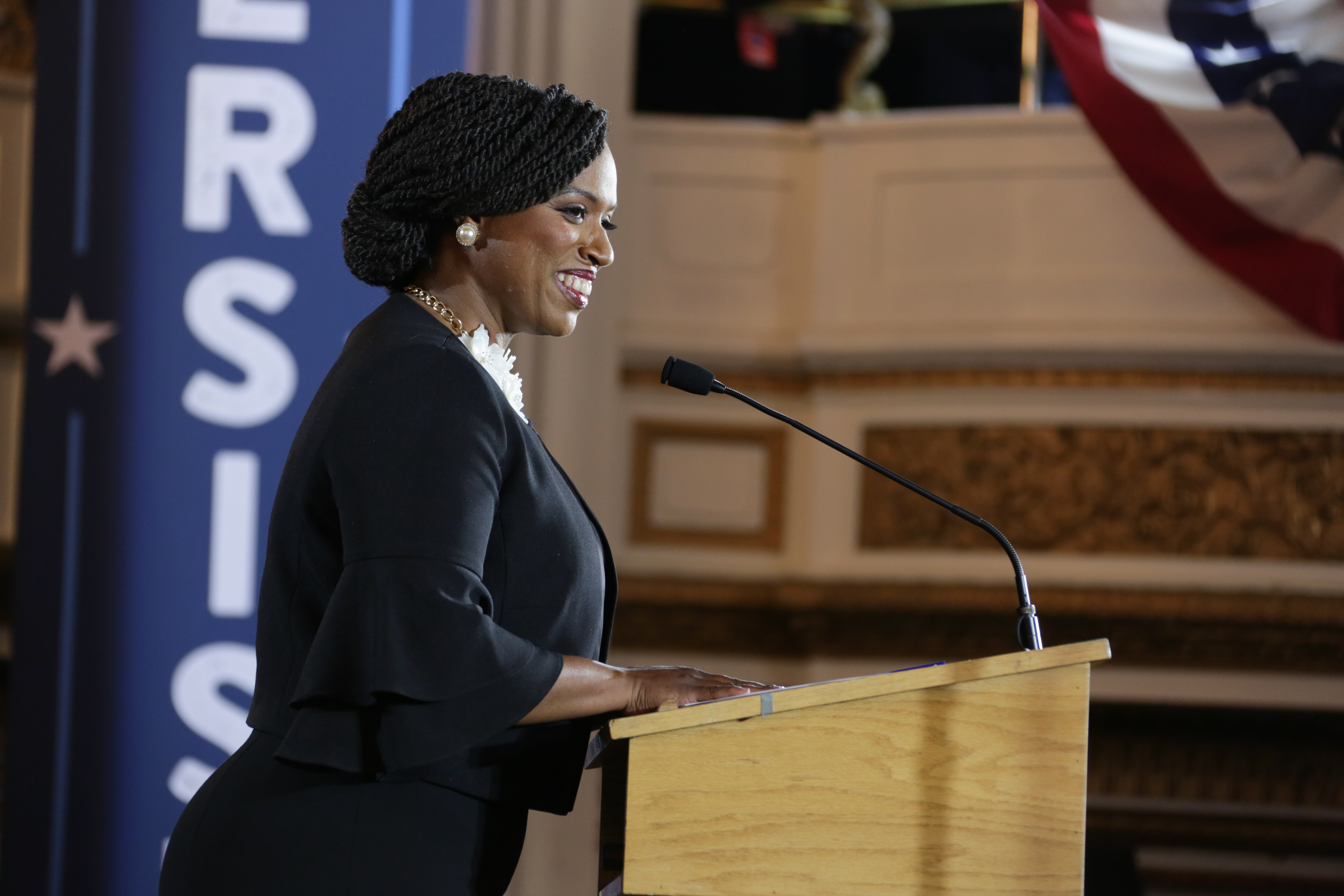
Pressley delivering victory remarks after her November 2018 congressional election win

In January 2018, Pressley announced her challenge to incumbent United States Representative Michael Capuano in the 2018 Democratic primary nomination for the Massachusetts's 7th congressional district. With a Cook Partisan Voting Index of D+34, the 7th is by far the most Democratic district in New England. No Republican even filed, though any Republican would have faced very long odds given the district's heavy Democratic bent. The GOP has only nominated a candidate in this district five times since longtime Speaker Tip O'Neill retired in 1986, and had last done so in 1998.

The 7th district is traditionally Democratic and is the state's only district where the majority of residents are not white. Capuano received endorsements from civil rights veteran and U.S. Representative John Lewis of Georgia as well as U.S. Representative Maxine Waters of California.

For years before she challenged him, Pressley had been speculated as a likely top contender to succeed Capuano if he were to retire.

Pressley was endorsed by the editorial boards of both The Boston Globe and the Boston Herald as well as a local chapter of the hotel and electrical worker union. Grassroots movements including Democracy for America, Brand New Congress and the Justice Democrats supported Pressley. She received the endorsements of former Massachusetts Democratic Party chair John E. Walsh, Massachusetts Attorney General Maura Healey, former Newton mayor Setti Warren and Boston city councilor Michelle Wu. The nomination win in New York's 14th congressional district of Alexandria Ocasio-Cortez over long-time representative Joseph Crowley increased the visibility of Pressley's campaign. While some political commentators distinguished Pressley's campaign from the one of Ocasio-Cortez as Capuano was understood to have one of the most progressive records in Congress, the incumbents both represented districts in which the majority of voters are not white.

Like Capuano, Pressley campaigned as a staunch progressive, acknowledging that her voting record would likely be similar to that of Capuano. However, she argued that simply maintaining a reliably liberal voting record was insufficient to address the changing needs of a district that had undergone significant demographic and cultural changes. She also claimed that the district needed to be represented by someone who would take a more aggressive role in opposing the presidency of Donald Trump. She campaigned with the slogan "change can't wait", and promised that she would bring "activist leadership".

In the September 4, 2018, Democratic primary election, Pressley defeated Capuano by a margin of 59% to 41%. The primary victory was a surprise, as the last poll before the election showed Capuano with a significant lead, 48% to 35%. Part of the reason the polls may have been inaccurate was a surge in the number of primary voters. According to the Boston NPR station WBUR, 24 percent of primary voters in the 7th district primary had not voted in the five previous primaries. The percentage of new voters included a disproportionate number of Hispanic and Asian voters. She won the general election unopposed.

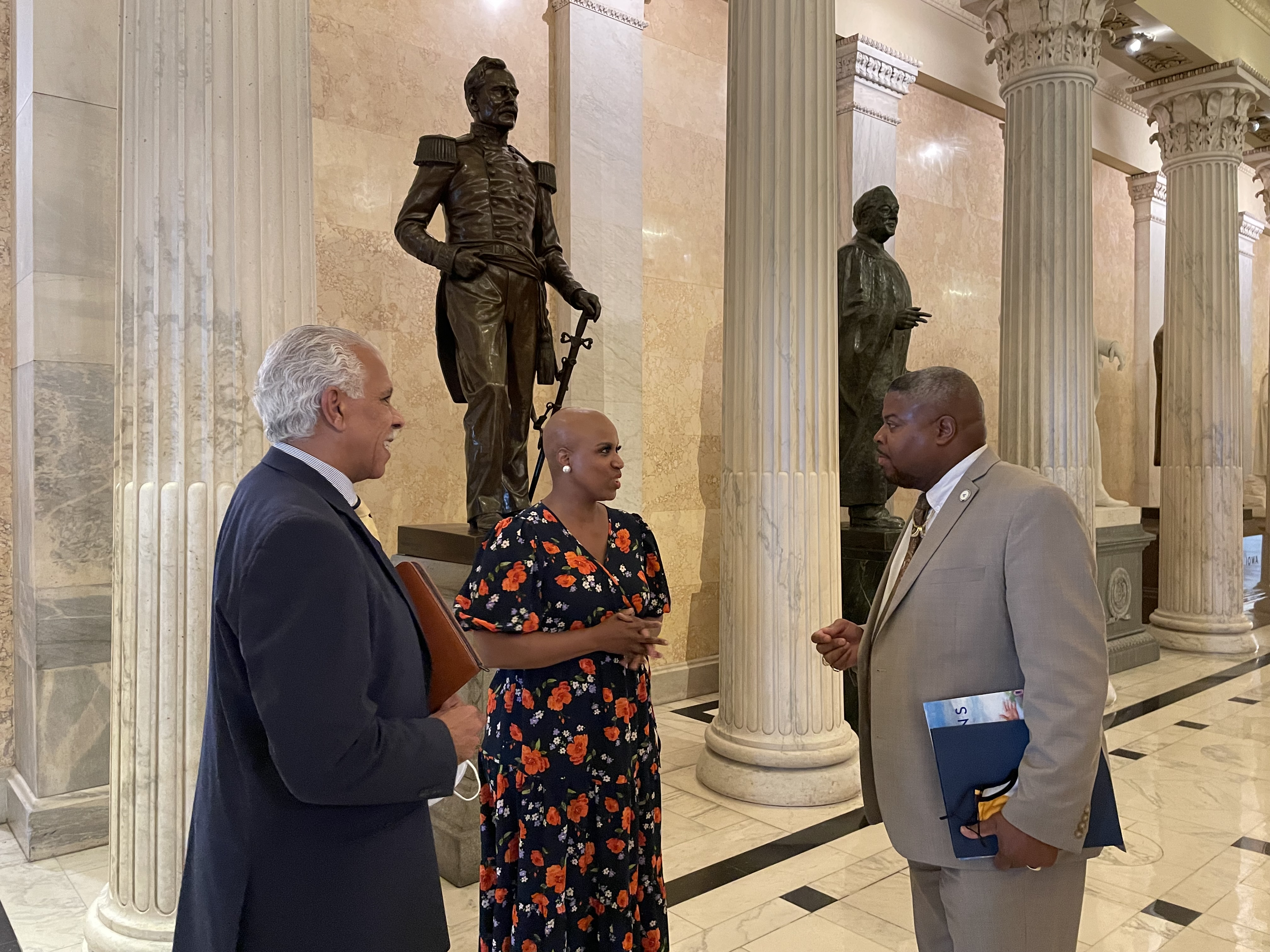
Congresswoman Ayanna Pressley, Dayton NAACP President Derrick L. Foward and NAACP National Policy Advisor Hilary O. Shelton meet at U.S. Capital, discussing upcoming 114th NAACP National Convention to be held in Boston, Massachusetts, in 2023.

==== 2020 ====
Pressley was unopposed for the Democratic nomination. Rayla Campbell, a claims adjuster and occupational zoning activist from Randolph, mounted a write-in campaign as a Republican. Pressley won the general election, securing a second term.

==== 2022 ====
Presley ran for a third term and defeated Republican Donnie Palmer in the general election. Palmer was the first Republican to run without a write-in campaign since 1998.

==== 2024 ====
Pressley ran unopposed in the Democratic primary and the general election, securing a fourth term representing District 7.

==== 2026 ====
Pressley ran unopposed in the Democratic primary and the general election, securing a fifth term representing District 7.

=== Tenure ===
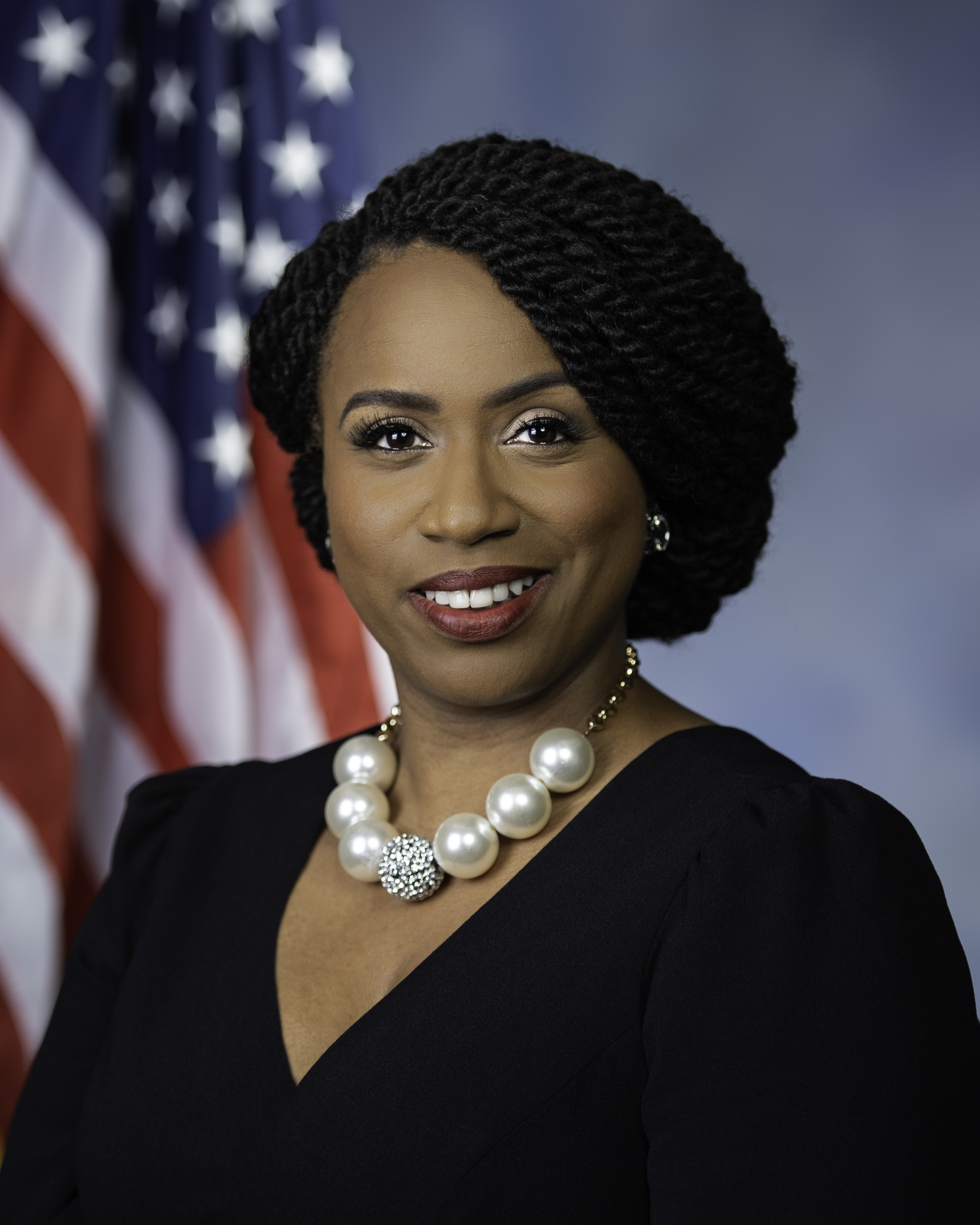
Pressley during the 116th Congress

Pressley is the first black woman elected to represent Massachusetts in Congress. With the November election victory of Jahana Hayes in Connecticut's 5th congressional district, they became the first women of color to be elected to Congress from New England.

Pressley is a member of the informal group known as "The Squad", whose members form a unified front to push for progressive changes such as the Green New Deal and Medicare-for-all. The other original members of "The Squad" are Ilhan Omar (D-MN), Rashida Tlaib (D-MI), and Alexandria Ocasio-Cortez (D-NY). Pressley is the oldest and most politically experienced of the four, and she was asked by the group to act as their spokesperson after then-President Donald J. Trump attacked them.

In an interview with The Boston Globe in July 2019, Pressley said her office received death threats after President Trump's tweets on July 14, 2019, and in general since her election.

In May 2019, Pressley gave the commencement address to the graduates of the University of Massachusetts Boston, saying they are "President Trump's worst nightmare". In her speech, she said, "Represented here today are dreamers and doers, immigrants, people of every race identity, every gender identity and sexuality, sisters rocking Senegalese twists and hijabs."

On September 17, 2019, Pressley filed a resolution that called for the House Judiciary Committee to launch impeachment proceedings against Supreme Court Justice Brett Kavanaugh.

In November 2019, Pressley introduced a criminal justice reform resolution that called for decriminalizing consensual sex work, abolishing cash bail, legalizing marijuana, abolishing capital punishment and solitary confinement, and shrinking the U.S. prison population by greater than 80 percent. The house resolution was called The People's Justice Guarantee.

In July 2021, Pressley joined Cori Bush and Ilhan Omar in sleeping on the steps of the U.S. Capitol to protest the expiration of the eviction moratorium during the COVID-19 pandemic in the United States.

On November 5, 2021, Pressley was one of six House Democrats who broke with their party and voted against the Infrastructure Investment and Jobs Act, as it was decoupled from the social safety net provisions in the Build Back Better Act.

In May 2025, Pressley, along with Zach Nunn (R-IA) and Lauren Underwood (D-IL), introduced the bipartisan HEALTH for MOM Act, which aims to expand access to maternal healthcare in areas lacking maternity care.

=== Committee assignments ===
- Committee on Financial Services
  - Subcommittee on Consumer Protection and Financial Institutions
  - Subcommittee on Diversity and Inclusion
- Committee on Oversight and Accountability

=== Caucus memberships ===
- Congressional Bike Caucus (co-chair)
- Black Maternal Health Caucus
- Congressional Arts Caucus
- Congressional Black Caucus
- Congressional Asian Pacific American Caucus
- Congressional Caucus for the Equal Rights Amendment (Pressley co-chairs it with Cori Bush)
- Congressional Caucus for Women's Issues
- Congressional Progressive Caucus
- Future of Transportation Caucus (founding co-chair)
- Congressional LGBTQ+ Equality Caucus

== Political positions ==
Pressley and Boston Mayor Michelle Wu attend an event together in March 2024.

Pressley's political positions align with the progressive wing of the Democratic Party. Her policy priorities reflect a focus on racial and economic justice, healthcare reform, and addressing systemic inequities.

=== Healthcare ===
Pressley is an advocate of Medicare for All.

In 2019, Pressley joined with Massachusetts Attorney General Maura Healey and Boston City Councilors Michelle Wu and Lydia Edwards in a digital campaign aimed at urging Massachusetts state lawmakers to adopt the Roe Act, a proposed state statue intended to codify the protections of abortion care provided in the Roe v. Wade U.S. Supreme Court decision (which was still good law at the time).

In May 2019, Pressley and Senator Cory Booker introduced the Healthy MOMMIES Act, legislation that would expand Medicaid coverage in an attempt to provide comprehensive prenatal, labor, and postpartum care with an extension of the Medicaid pregnancy pathway from 60 days to a full year following birth to assure new mothers have access to services unrelated to pregnancy. The bill also directed Medicaid and the Children's Health Insurance Program's Payment and Access Commission to report its data regarding doula care coverage under state Medicaid programs and subsequently develop strategies aimed at improving access to doula care.

=== Civil liberties ===
Pressley has supported the U.S. national anthem protests, which have been used to bring attention to the disproportionate rate at which police brutality affects black people.

On March 5, 2019, Pressley proposed lowering the voting age from 18 years old to 16 in an amendment she introduced in Congress. This was her first amendment on the House floor and was intended to amend the For the People Act of 2019. Her amendment was defeated 305–126–2, with a slight majority of the Democrats and one Republican voting in favor.

On December 5, 2019, Pressley, Cory Booker, and Representatives Cedric Richmond, Marcia Fudge, and Barbara Lee introduced the Create a Respectful and Open World for Natural Hair (CROWN) Act to ban discrimination based on hair textures and hairstyles that are commonly associated with a particular race or national origin.

=== Immigration ===
In June 2018, Pressley called for the defunding of U.S. Immigration and Customs Enforcement, saying the law enforcement agency poses an "existential threat" to immigrant communities.

In June 2019, Pressley was one of four Democratic representatives to vote against the Emergency Supplemental Appropriations for Humanitarian Assistance and Security at the Southern Border Act (H.R. 3401), a $4.5 billion border funding bill sponsored by Nita Lowey that required Customs and Border Protection enact health standards for individuals in custody such as forming standards for individuals for "medical emergencies; nutrition, hygiene, and facilities; and personnel training."

In 2021, Pressley was an original cosponsor of the New Way Forward Act, which would overhaul federal immigration enforcement by eliminating mandatory detention, decriminalize unauthorized entry and reentry, narrow criminal grounds for deportation, and expand judicial discretion in removal proceedings.

=== Sexual violence and sex work ===
In 2018, Pressley said that she would make ending sexual violence a major priority of her work in Congress.

Pressley supports decriminalizing sex work, saying it "would improve the health and safety of sex workers and put them on the path to greater stability." She argued that sex work is the only work available to some marginalized people, especially transgender women of color and that they would be less at risk if they could self-advocate and report unlawful acts committed against them.

=== Labor ===
On April 9, 2019, Pressley was one of four House Democrats to introduce the Be HEARD Act, legislation intended to abolish the tipped minimum wage along with ending mandatory arbitration and pre-employment nondisclosure agreements. The bill would also give workers additional time to report harassment.

=== Foreign policy ===
On July 23, 2019, Pressley voted in favor of H. Res. 246, a House Resolution introduced by Illinois Congressman Brad Schneider that formally condemns the Boycott, Divestment, and Sanctions movement against Israel. The resolution passed 398–17; Pressley was the only member of "the Squad" to vote in favor of it. On September 23 Pressley was one of eight Democrats to vote against the funding of Israel's Iron Dome missile defense system.

Speaking at a fundraiser with Ilhan Omar in Somerville, Massachusetts, Pressley condemned the 2020 Baghdad International Airport airstrike that killed Iranian general Qasem Soleimani, saying: "It is consistent with the impulsive, reckless, short-sighted foreign policy of the occupant of this White House who I think proceeds as if he's engaging in a game of Battleship and does not prioritize diplomacy."

In 2023, Pressley was among 56 Democrats to vote in favor of H.Con.Res. 21 which directed President Joe Biden to remove U.S. troops from Syria within 180 days.

On July 18, 2023, she voted against, along with eight other progressive Democrats (Alexandria Ocasio-Cortez, Cori Bush, Jamaal Bowman, André Carson, Summer Lee, Ilhan Omar, Delia Ramirez, and Rashida Tlaib), the congressional non-binding resolution proposed by August Pfluger which states that "the State of Israel is not a racist or an apartheid state", that Congress rejects "all forms of antisemitism and xenophobia" and that "the United States will always be a staunch partner and supporter of Israel."

She condemned Hamas's October 2023 attack on Israel. On October 16, 2023, Pressley signed a resolution calling for a ceasefire in the Gaza war. She said on the press call: "Let me make it plain: the murder of innocent Israeli civilians by Hamas is horrific and unacceptable. And the murder of innocent Palestinian civilians is a horrific and unacceptable response from Israel. Vengeance should not be a foreign policy doctrine."

=== Student loan forgiveness ===
In February 2021, Pressley supported a plan to cancel up to $50,000 in federal student loan debt for approximately 44 million Americans. She urged President Biden to forgive the debt through executive order rather than the legislative process, which she argued would be stalled by partisan gridlock. Pressley told The Boston Globe, "It's about an equitable economic recovery. If people really do believe that Black Lives Matter, then the only receipts that matter in this moment are budgets and policies."

=== Credit reports ===
As a city councilor, Pressley introduced an ordinance prohibiting employers from using credit scores to assess prospective and existing hires.

As a congresswoman, Pressley was the author of a credit report reform bill titled the "Comprehensive Credit Reporting Enhancement, Disclosure, Innovation, and Transparency Act" ("CREDIT Act"). It passed the House 221-to-189 in January 2020. The resolution would have:

- Placed limits on employers' use of credit scores in their hiring process
- Provided greater oversight of the credit score industry by the Consumer Financial Protection Bureau
- Decreased the time most negative credit information remains in credit scores from seven to four years.
- Decreased the amount of time that bankruptcy information remains on credit scores from ten years to seven years
- Made it easier for individuals to request that "potentially material" errors on their credit reports be remedied
- Provided expanded opportunities for those with student loans to improve their credit scores
- Prohibited debt from "medically necessary" procedures from being reported
- Placed greater delays on the reporting of other debt incurred from medical expenses

=== Presidential primary endorsements ===
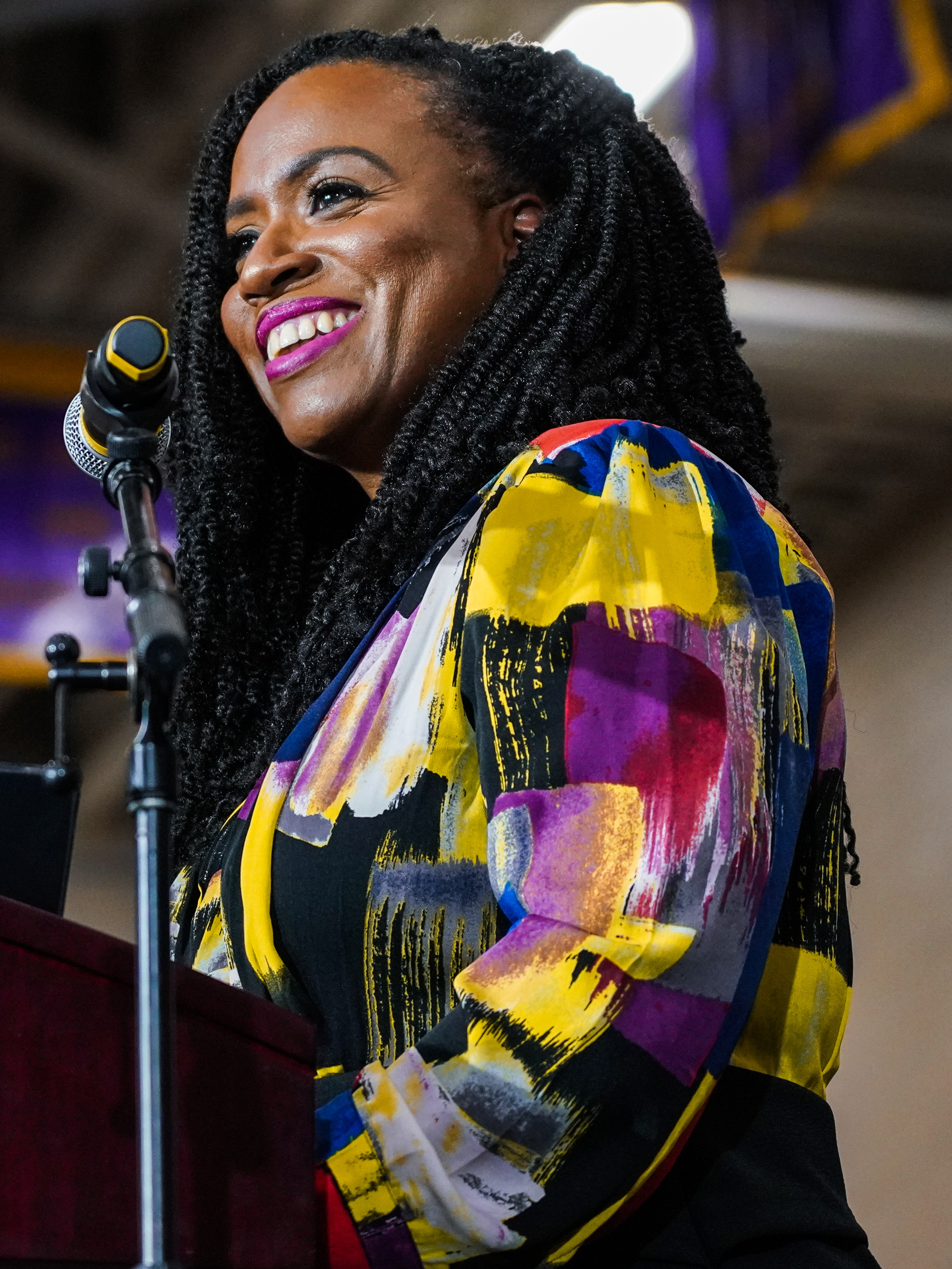
Pressley at a town hall for Elizabeth Warren in November 2019

During the 2016 Democratic Party presidential primaries, Pressley endorsed the candidacy of Hillary Clinton.

In November 2019, Pressley endorsed the candidacy of Senator Elizabeth Warren for president ahead of the 2020 Democratic Party presidential primaries. This set Pressley apart from the other three members of "The Squad", who had endorsed Bernie Sanders. Pressley, who was named one of Warren's three national co-chairs, became a prominent surrogate on the campaign circuit. After Warren's withdrawal, Pressley did not transfer her support to Joe Biden or Bernie Sanders until the time of the Democratic National Convention, when she endorsed Biden for president.

=== Criminal justice reform ===
Pressley supports prison reform and supports programs for prisoner reentry that start well before an inmate has been released. In 2020, Pressley's husband, who spent ten years in prison, testified before the United States House Judiciary Subcommittee on Crime, Terrorism and Homeland Security saying "All the other things that organizations can offer, like identification cards, are important, but it all starts with where you lay your head at night." In the autumn of 2019, Pressley introduced a resolution calling for an overhaul of the criminal justice system called the People's Justice Guarantee.

In early June 2020, Pressley and Libertarian representative Justin Amash introduced the Ending Qualified Immunity Act. The act would remove from law enforcement officers, and other officials, the protection of qualified immunity that had routinely protected them from prosecution when they could claim that acts that would otherwise trigger criminal charges had been committed as part of performing their official duties.

=== Public transit and infrastructure ===
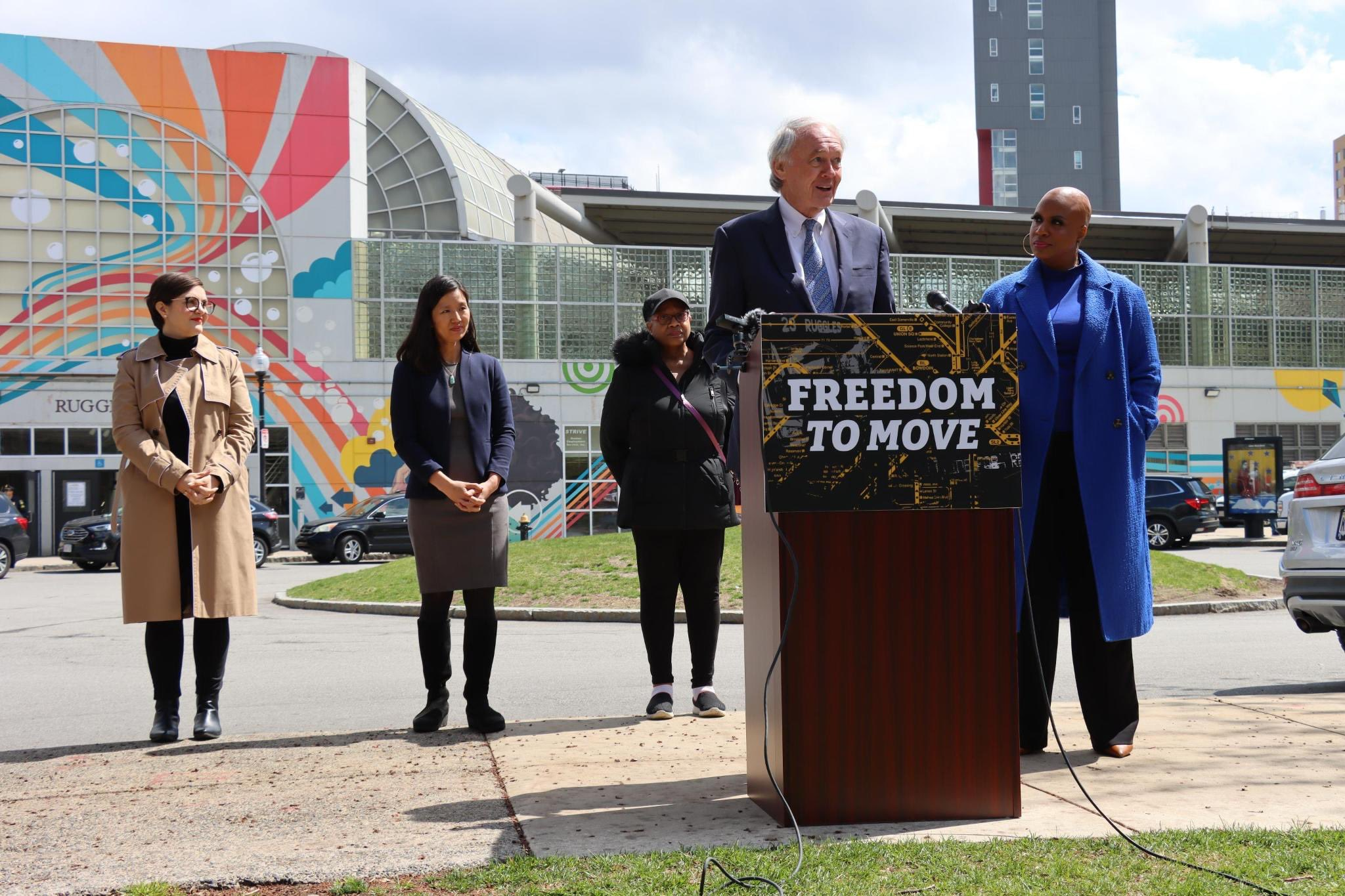
April 2023 press conference by Pressley (far right) and Senator Ed Markey (second from right) promoting their "Freedom to Move" legislation. They are joined by Boston Mayor Michelle Wu (second from left) and others.

Pressley advocates for making public transit fare-free for users. In 2020, she co-authored the Freedom to Move Act with Senator Ed Markey, which would have offered $5 billion in annual competitive grants to transit agencies that offer fare-free transit access. She and Markey reintroduced the bill in April 2023.

On November 5, 2021, Pressley was one of six House Democrats who broke with their party and voted with a majority of Republicans against the Infrastructure Investment and Jobs Act, a $1.2 trillion infrastructure spending bill.

=== Reparations for slavery ===
On February 12, 2025, Pressley reintroduced a bill to establish a commission to study and develop reparation proposals for African Americans. Pressley said in an NBC News interview. "We find ourselves in a moment of emboldened white supremacy and anti-Black racism, and a weaponized Supreme Court that is actively gutting protections and progress that has been made".

== Personal life ==
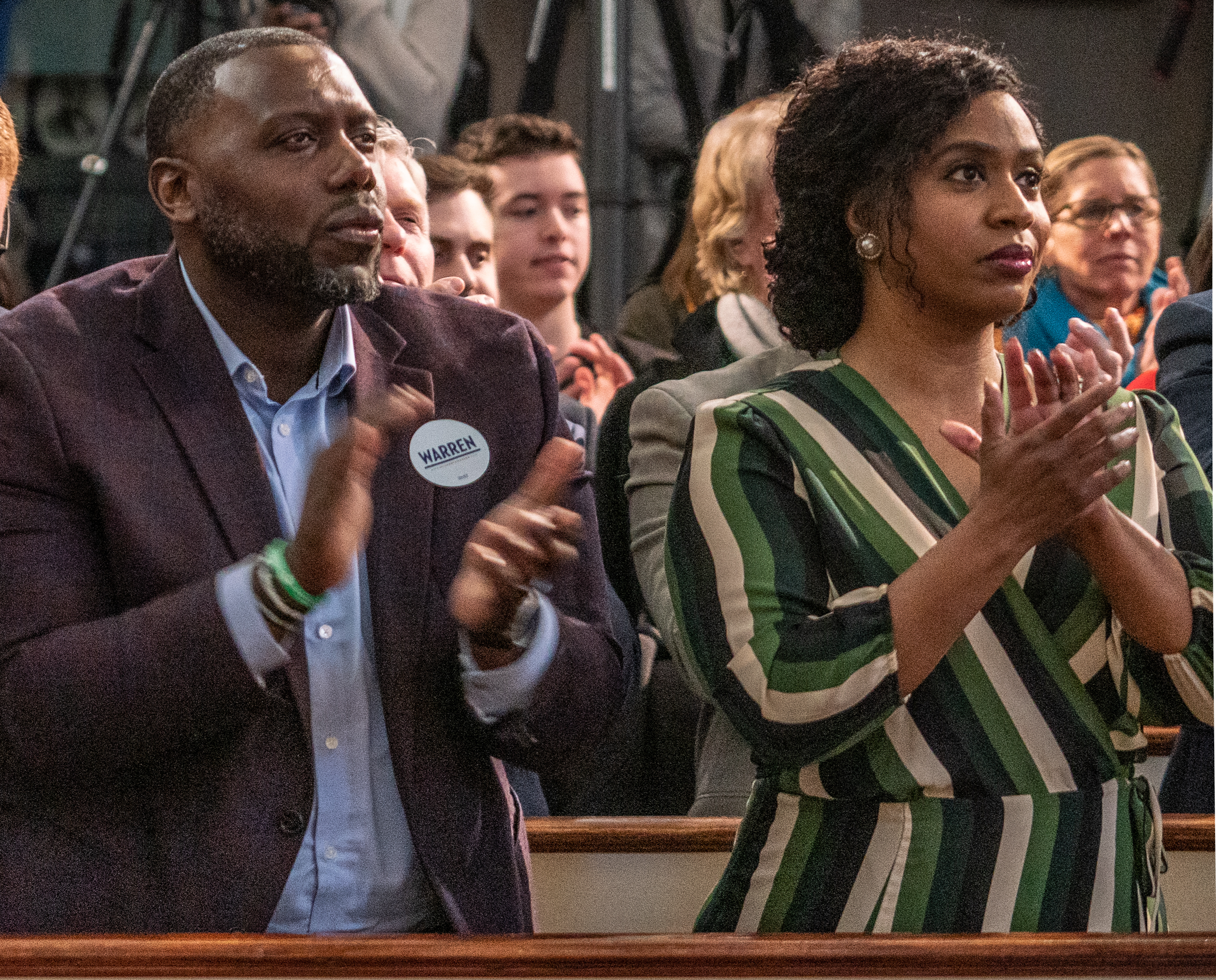
Pressley with her husband in 2019

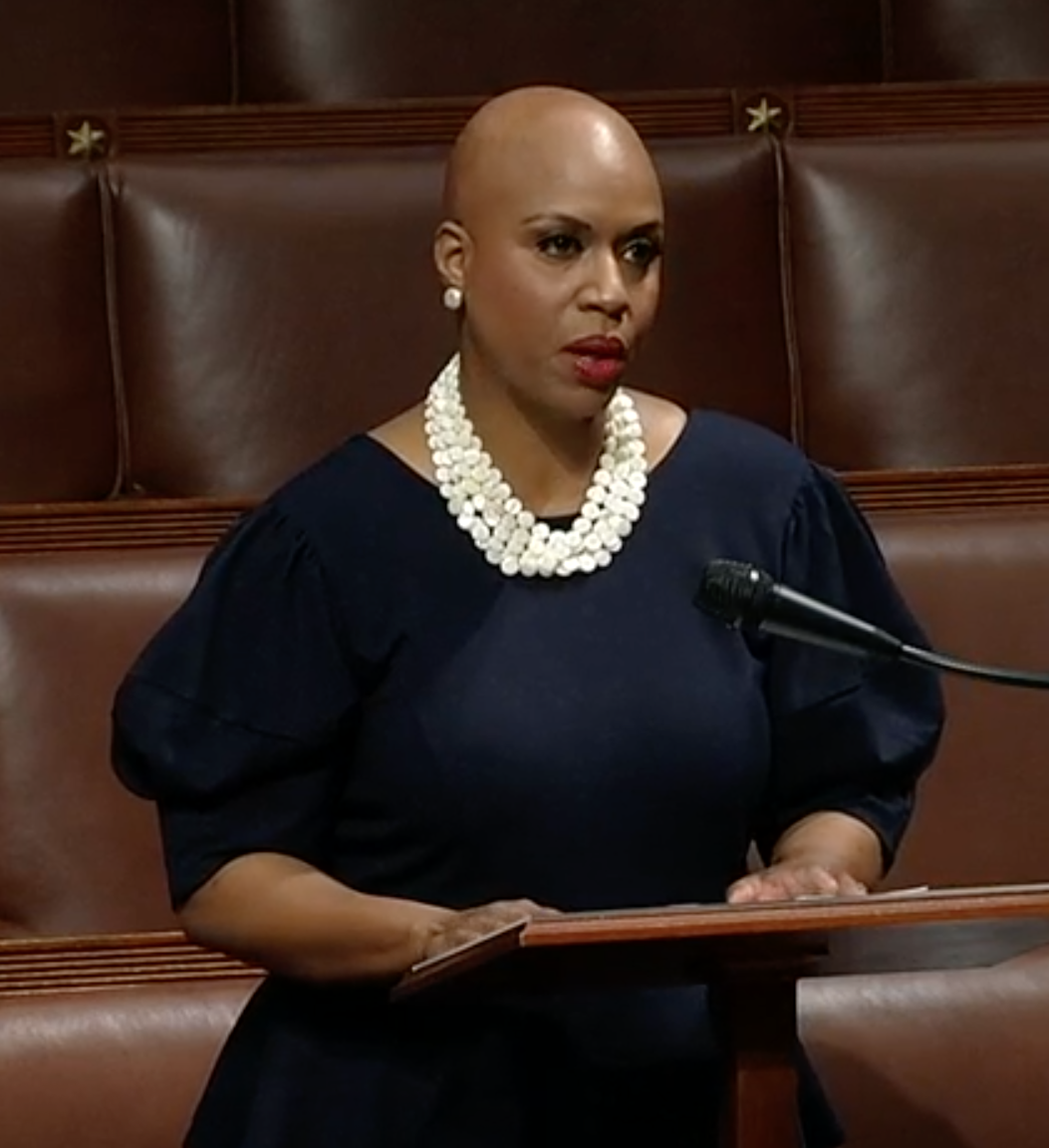
Pressley speaking in the House chamber about her alopecia

Pressley lives in Boston's Dorchester neighborhood with her husband, Conan Harris, and her stepdaughter. In January 2019, her husband resigned from his position as a senior public safety adviser at Boston City Hall to form his own consulting firm, Conan Harris & Associates.

Pressley has stated that she is a "woman of faith" who "grew up in the church" and she is the granddaughter of a Baptist preacher. Pressley's paternal grandmother died during childbirth in the 1950s.

She has been public about her experience as a survivor of child sexual abuse, and also of having been sexually assaulted while a student at Boston University.

In January 2020, Pressley revealed that she had been diagnosed with alopecia areata, resulting in the loss of all of her hair; she said in a public announcement, "I want to be freed from the secret and the shame that that secret carries with it." In 2022, she appeared in the docuseries The Hair Tales, where she discussed her experience of alopecia. After Will Smith slapped Chris Rock at the 2022 Oscars, Pressley sent out a tweet supporting Smith's actions as a husband of someone with alopecia, which she later deleted.

Pressley is a member of the nonprofit social and service organization The Links.

== Honors and awards ==
- 2012: Aspen-Rodel Fellow in Public Leadership, Class of 2012
- 2012: Truman National Security Project Partner
- 2014: Greater Boston Chamber of Commerce, 10 Outstanding Young Leaders
- 2014: Victim Rights Law Center, Leadership Award
- 2015: Boston magazine, 50 Most Powerful People
- 2015: EMILY's List, Gabby Giffords Rising Star Award
- 2016: The New York Times, 14 Young Democrats to Watch
- 2018: Boston magazine, 100 Most Influential People in Boston, #20
- 2020: Children's HealthWatch Champion
- 2021: Doctor of Laws, Honoris Causa from Simmons University
- 2023: Black Women Lead Banner, honoring Black women leaders who have shaped Boston

== Electoral history ==
=== Boston City Council ===
==== 2009 ====
2009 Boston City Council at-large election
Candidates	Preliminary election		General election	
Candidates	Votes	%	Votes	%
John R. Connolly (incumbent)	35,182	18.08	51,362	18.35
Stephen J. Murphy (incumbent)	30,365	15.61	51,008	18.22
Felix G. Arroyo	25,859	13.29	45,144	16.13
Ayanna Pressley	16,866	8.67	41,879	14.96
Tito Jackson	12,535	6.44	30,203	10.79
Andrew Kenneally	12,653	6.50	24,249	8.66
Tomás González	10,122	5.20	18,310	6.54
Doug Bennett	10,529	5.41	16,842	6.02
Ego Ezedi	9,260	4.76		
Hiep Quoc Nguyen	7,691	3.95		
Sean H. Ryan	6,665	3.43		
Jean-Claude Sanon	5,386	2.77		
Robert Fortes	5,071	2.61		
Bill Trabucco	3,132	1.61		
Scotland Willis	2,639	1.36		
all others	595	0.31	951	0.34

==== 2011 ====
Candidates	2011 Boston City Council at-large election	
Candidates	Votes	%
Ayanna Pressley (incumbent)	37,532	21.42%
Felix G. Arroyo (incumbent)	35,483	20.25%
John R. Connolly (incumbent)	32,827	18.74%
Stephen J. Murphy (incumbent)	26,730	15.26%
Michael F. Flaherty	25,805	14.73%
Will Dorcena	8,739	4.99%
Sean H. Ryan	7,376	4.21%

==== 2013 ====
2013 Boston at-large City Council election
Candidate	Primary election		General election	
Candidate	Votes	%	Votes	%
Ayanna Pressley (incumbent)	42,915	16.71	60,799	18.30
Michelle Wu	29,384	11.44	59,741	17.98
Michael F. Flaherty	39,904	15.54	55,104	16.59
Stephen J. Murphy (incumbent)	31,728	12.35	44,993	13.54
Annissa Essaibi George	12,244	4.77	30,538	9.19
Jeffrey Michael Ross	13,939	5.43	28,879	8.69
Martin J. Keogh	15,743	6.13	26,500	7.98
Jack F. Kelly III	11,909	4.64	23,967	7.22
Catherine M. O'Neill	10,952	4.26		
Althea Garrison	10,268	4.00		
Ramon Soto	9,928	3.87		
Philip Arthur Frattaroli	5,832	2.27		
Gareth R. Saunders	5,363	2.09		
Christopher J. Conroy	3,433	1.34		
Seamus M. Whelan	3,118	1.21		
Francisco L. White	2745	1.07		
Douglas D. Wohn	2,382	0.93		
Frank John Addivinola Jr.	2,240	0.87		
Keith B. Kenyon	1,950	0.76		
Jamarhl Crawford	21†	0.01		
all others	832	0.32	1,658	0.50

† write-in votes

==== 2015 ====
2015 Boston at-large City Council election
Candidate	Votes	%
Ayanna Pressley (incumbent)	31,783	24.21
Michelle Wu (incumbent)	28,908	22.02
Michael F. Flaherty (incumbent)	26,473	20.16
Annissa Essaibi George	23,447	17.86
Stephen J. Murphy (incumbent)	19,546	14.89
Jovan J. Lacet write-in	95	0.07
Charles Yancey write-in	39	0.03
Jean-Claud Sanon write-in	25	0.02
Andrea Campbell write-in	13	0.01
all others	959	0.73

==== 2017 ====
2017 Boston at-large City Council election
Candidate	Votes	%
Michelle Wu (incumbent)	65,040	24.47
Ayanna Pressley (incumbent)	57,520	21.64
Michael F. Flaherty (incumbent)	51,673	19.44
Annissa Essaibi George (incumbent)	45,564	17.14
Althea Garrison	18,253	6.87
Domingos DaRosa	11,647	4.38
William A. King	8,773	3.30
Pat Payaso	6,124	2.30
all others	1,230	0.46

=== United States House of Representatives ===
==== 2018 ====
Massachusetts's 7th congressional district Democratic Primary, 2018
Party	Candidate	Votes	%
Democratic	Ayanna Pressley	60,046	58.6
Democratic	Mike Capuano (incumbent)	42,430	41.4
Total votes		102,476	100

Massachusetts's 7th congressional district General Election, 2018
Party	Candidate	Votes	%
Democratic	Ayanna Pressley	216,557	98.2
n/a	Write-ins	3,852	1.8
Total votes		220,409	100.0
Democratic hold			

==== 2020 ====
Massachusetts's 7th congressional district Democratic Primary, 2020
Party	Candidate	Votes	%
Democratic	Ayanna Pressley (incumbent)	142,108	98.6
Democratic	Other	1,979	1.4
Total votes		144,087	100

Massachusetts's 7th congressional district General Election, 2020
Party	Candidate	Votes	%
Democratic	Ayanna Pressley (incumbent)	267,362	86.6
Independent	Roy Owens	38,675	12.5
n/a	Other	2,613	0.9
Total votes		308,650	100.0
Democratic hold			

==== 2022 ====
Massachusetts's 7th congressional district Democratic primary, 2022
Party	Candidate	Votes	%
Democratic	Ayanna Pressley (incumbent)	69,227	98.7
Write-in		893	1.3
Total votes		70,120	100.0

Massachusetts's 7th congressional district General Election, 2022
Party	Candidate	Votes	%
Democratic	Ayanna Pressley (incumbent)	151,825	84.6
Republican	Donnie Palmer	27,129	15.1
Write-in		557	0.3
Total votes		179,511	100.0
Democratic hold			

==== 2024 ====
Massachusetts's 7th congressional district Democratic primary, 2024
Party	Candidate	Votes	%
Democratic	Ayanna Pressley (incumbent)	57,172	100.0
Total votes		57,172	100.0

Massachusetts's 7th congressional district General Election, 2024
Party	Candidate	Votes	%
Democratic	Ayanna Pressley (incumbent)	232,094	97.1%
Write-in		6,907	2.9%
Total votes		239,001	100%
Democratic hold			

== See also ==
- List of African-American United States representatives
- Women in the United States House of Representatives

U.S. House of Representatives
Preceded by Mike Capuano	Member of the U.S. House of Representatives from Massachusetts's 7th congressional district 2019–present	Incumbent
U.S. order of precedence (ceremonial)
Preceded by Chris Pappas	United States representatives by seniority 220th	Succeeded by Guy Reschenthaler
