= Congressional Bike Caucus =

Congressional caucus in the United States

- Republican co-chair: Rep. Vern Buchanan (FL-16)
- Democratic co-chairs: Mike Thompson (CA), Ayanna Pressley (MA-7)
- Political position: Bipartisan
- Colors: None official (gray unofficial)
- Seats in the House: 107 / 435

The Congressional Bike Caucus (CBC) is a bipartisan caucus of the United States House of Representatives launched by Representative Earl Blumenauer. It is officially registered with the Committee on House Administration, the house committee responsible for regulating caucuses. The caucus aims to promote cycling by improving infrastructure and increasing awareness of cyclists. As of 2023 the caucus has 107 members. Co-chairs of the caucus have included Representatives Earl Blumenauer (until 2025), Vern Buchanan, and Ayanna Pressley.

== See also ==
- Congressional Motorcycle Safety Caucus
