= Free thought (disambiguation) =

Freethought is a philosophical viewpoint that holds opinions should be formed on the basis of logic, reason, and empiricism. It may also refer to:

== Organizations ==
- De Vrije Gedachte, the Dutch freethinkers association "The Free Thought"

== Publications ==
- The Free Thought — a Ukrainian-language newspaper published in Australia
- The Freethinker (journal), British journal, oldest surviving secularist publication in the world, first published in 1881
- The Freethinker (newspaper), a Whig newspaper founded in 1718 by Ambrose Philips and Hugh Boulter
- The Freethinker (film), a 1994 film by Peter Watkins.
- Free Thinker (book), a 2016 poetry book by Alan Kimble (pen name of comedian Chris Strait)

== People ==
- Eme Freethinker (born 1979), Dominican-born street artist
