= Ending Qualified Immunity Act =

Proposed United States legislation

- Long title: To amend the Revised Statutes to remove the defense of qualified immunity in the case of any action under section 1979, and for other purposes.
- Announced in: the 117th United States Congress
- Number of co-sponsors: 39

Legislative history
- Introduced in the House of Representatives as H.R. 3602 by Ayanna Pressley (D–MA) on May 23, 2025; Committee consideration by House Committee on the Judiciary

The Ending Qualified Immunity Act is a proposed United States Act of Congress introduced in 2020 by Justin Amash (L-Michigan) and Ayanna Pressley (D-Massachusetts) to end qualified immunity in the United States. Qualified immunity shields police officers and other government officials from being held personally liable for discretionary actions performed within their official capacity (even if those actions violate the civil rights of those affected) unless their actions violate "clearly established" federal law, a precedent requiring both that those actions violate written law and that there be a judicial precedent establishing that such actions are unlawful.

The bill was re-introduced in the 117th, 118th, and 119th Congresses by Rep. Pressley in the House of Representatives and by Sen. Edward Markey in the Senate.

== History ==
The bill was introduced to the House of Representatives on June 2, 2020. In introducing the act, Amash explained:

This week, I am introducing the Ending Qualified Immunity Act to eliminate qualified immunity and restore Americans' ability to obtain relief when police officers violate their constitutionally secured rights. The brutal killing of George Floyd by Minneapolis police is merely the latest in a long line of incidents of egregious police misconduct. This pattern continues because police are legally, politically, and culturally insulated from consequences for violating the rights of the people whom they have sworn to serve. That must change so that these incidents of brutality stop happening.

As of August 22, 2020, the Ending Qualified Immunity Act had 66 cosponsors, of whom Representative McClintock is the only Republican. The bill's sponsorship by members of the Libertarian, Republican, and Democratic parties makes it a tripartisan bill.

== Background ==
Qualified immunity is a legal doctrine in United States federal law which shields government officials from being held personally liable for discretionary actions performed within their official capacity, unless their actions violate "clearly established" federal law—even if the victim's civil rights were violated. The U.S. Supreme Court introduced the qualified immunity doctrine in 1967, originally with the rationale of protecting law enforcement officials from frivolous lawsuits and financial liability in cases where they acted in good faith in unclear legal situations. Starting around 2005, courts increasingly applied the doctrine to cases involving the use of excessive or deadly force by police, leading to widespread criticism that it, in the words of a 2020 Reuters report, "has become a nearly failsafe tool to let police brutality go unpunished and deny victims their constitutional rights".

== Legislative history ==
Congress	Short title	Bill number(s)	Date introduced	Sponsor(s)	# of cosponsors	Latest status
116th Congress	Ending Qualified Immunity Act	H.R. 7085	June 4, 2020	Ayanna Pressley (D-MA)	66	Died in committee
116th Congress	Ending Qualified Immunity Act	S. 4142	July 1, 2020	Ed Markey (D-MA)	2	Died in committee
117th Congress	Ending Qualified Immunity Act	H.R. 1470	March 1, 2021	Ayanna Pressley (D-MA)	41	Died in committee
117th Congress	Ending Qualified Immunity Act	S. 492	March 1, 2021	Ed Markey (D-MA)	2	Died in committee
118th Congress	Ending Qualified Immunity Act	S. 1196	April 19, 2023	Ed Markey (D-MA)	2	Died in committee
118th Congress	Ending Qualified Immunity Act	H.R. 2847	April 25, 2023	Ayanna Pressley (D-MA)	44	Died in committee
119th Congress	Ending Qualified Immunity Act	S. 1913	May 22, 2025	Ed Markey (D-MA)	2	Died in committee
119th Congress	Ending Qualified Immunity Act	H.R. 3602	May 23, 2025	Ayanna Pressley (D-MA)	18	Died in committee
