= Michael Cardoza =

American defense attorney

- Born: Michael Edmund Cardoza; July 6, 1944 (age 81); San Francisco, California, U.S.
- Education: McGeorge School of Law, Juris Doctor, 1971
- Occupation: Attorney
- Employer: Cardoza Law Offices
- Website: http://www.cardolaw.com

Michael Edmund Cardoza (born July 6, 1944) is a defense attorney in California. Prior to his criminal defense work, he worked in three of California's District attorney offices: Los Angeles County, San Francisco County, and Alameda County. He currently operates Cardoza Law, a private practice.

== Background ==
In 1971, Michael Cardoza received his J.D. from McGeorge School of Law. He passed the California Bar the same year, and began practicing as a trial attorney in the District Attorney's Offices of Los Angeles, San Francisco, and Alameda County. He worked as a prosecutor for 14 years before he opened his private practice in 1985. His current practice, Cardoza Law Offices, is located in Walnut Creek, California. Since opening his private practice, Cardoza has worked on cases such as the Scott Peterson trial and the Barry Bonds steroid scandal. Additionally, he acts as a Judge Pro Tem in Santa Clara County and an arbitrator with the Superior Court of San Francisco.
