= Gabri Castle =

Castle in Tehran Province, Iran

- قلعه گبری
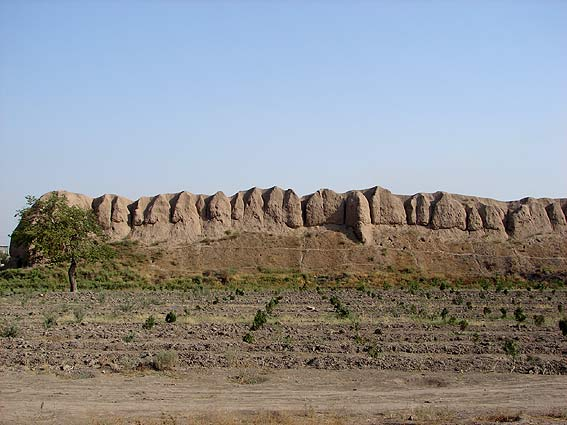
- Interactive map of the Gabri Castle area

General information
- Type: Castle
- Location: Ray, Iran
- Coordinates: 35°35′01″N 51°27′02″E

Gabri Castle (Persian: قلعه گبری) is a historical castle located in Ray County in Tehran province, Iran. The longevity of this fortress dates back to the Sasanian Empire.
