= Glenn MacDonald =

American economist

Glenn M. MacDonald
- Born: August 27, 1952 (age 74); Halifax, Nova Scotia, Canada
- Occupations: Professor, economist, consultant

Academic background
- Education: B.A. (economics and mathematics, summa cum laude) 1975, York University; MA, 1978, PhD, 1979 economics, University of Rochester
- Website: apps.olin.wustl.edu/faculty/macdonald/

Glenn MacDonald (born August 27, 1952) is a Canadian-born American economist. He is the John M. Olin Distinguished Professor of Economics and Strategy at the Olin Business School at Washington University in St. Louis, and a professor of economics in the department of economics in the school's College of Arts and Sciences. He also founded and served as the director of the Center for Research in Economics and Strategy at Olin until it was closed in 2025.

== Early life ==
MacDonald was born on August 27, 1952, in Halifax, Nova Scotia, Canada. He enrolled at York University in Toronto, Ontario, for his Honors Bachelor of Arts and Science degree in economics and mathematics "because it was something to do." He graduated Summa Cum Laude in 1975 and enrolled at the University of Rochester for his Master's degree and PhD in economics.

== Career ==
MacDonald returned to Canada as lecturer at the University of Western Ontario in 1978. After completing his PhD in 1979, he became an assistant professor, receiving tenure and promotion to associate professor in 1982, and promotion to Full Professor in 1984. He joined the University of Rochester's Simon School of Business in 1992. In 2001, MacDonald joined Washington University in St. Louis as the John M. Olin Distinguished Professor of Economics and Strategy and Director of the Center for Research in Economics and Strategy.

== Selected publications ==
- Barro, Robert J.; MacDonald, Glenn (June 1979). "Social security and consumer spending in an international cross section". Journal of Public Economics. 11 (3): 275–289. doi:10.1016/0047-2727(79)90024-0.
- White, Halbert; MacDonald, Glenn (March 1980). "Some Large-Sample Tests for Nonnormality in the Linear Regression Model". Journal of the American Statistical Association. 75 (369): 16–28. doi:10.1080/01621459.1980.10477415.
- MacDonald, Glenn (June 1980). "Person-specific Information in the Labor Market". Journal of Political Economy. 88 (3): 578–597. doi:10.1086/260888.
- MacDonald, Glenn (September 1981). "The Impact of Schooling on Wages". Econometrica. 49 (5): 1349–1359. doi:10.2307/1912760. JSTOR 1912760.
- MacDonald, Glenn (September 1982). "Information in Production". Econometrica. 50 (5): 1143–1162. doi:10.2307/1911867. JSTOR 1911867.
- MacDonald, Glenn (December 1982). "A Market Equilibrium Theory of Job Assignment and Sequential Accumulation of Information". The American Economic Review. 72: 1038–1055.
- MacDonald, Glenn (August 1984). "New Directions in the Economic Theory of Agency". The Canadian Journal of Economics. 17 (3): 415–440. doi:10.2307/135183. JSTOR 135183. Archived from the original on November 16, 2023.
- MacDonald, Glenn; Markusen, James M. (April 1985). "A Rehabilitation of Absolute Advantage". Journal of Political Economy. 93 (2): 277–297. doi:10.1086/261300.
- Horstmann, Ignatius; MacDonald, Glenn; Slivinski, Alan (October 1985). "Patents as Information Transfer Mechanisms: To Patent or (Maybe) Not to Patent". Journal of Political Economy. 93 (5): 837–858. doi:10.1086/261338. S2CID 35986688.
- MacDonald, Glenn; Slivinski, Alan (1987). "The Simple Analytics of Competitive Equilibrium with Multiproduct Firms". The American Economic Review. 77: 941–953.
- MacDonald, Glenn (1988). "Job Mobility in Market Equilibrium". The Review of Economic Studies. 55 (1): 153–168. doi:10.2307/2297535. JSTOR 2297535.
- MacDonald, Glenn (1988). "The Economics of Rising Stars". The American Economic Review. 78 (1). American Economic Association: 155–166. JSTOR 1814704.
- Jovanovic, Boyan; MacDonald, Glenn (February 1994). "Competitive Diffusion". Journal of Political Economy. 102 (1): 24–52. doi:10.1086/261920. S2CID 219395417.
- Jovanovic, Boyan; MacDonald, Glenn (April 1994). "The Life Cycle of a Competitive Industry" (PDF). Journal of Political Economy. 102 (2): 322–347. doi:10.1086/261934. S2CID 55868167. SSRN 480243. Archived (PDF) from the original on June 2, 2018.
- MacDonald, Glenn (February 2004). "The Economics of Has-beens". Journal of Political Economy. 112: S289–S310. doi:10.1086/380948.
- MacDonald, Glenn; Marx, Leslie M. (August 2001). "Adverse Specialization". Journal of Political Economy. 109 (4): 864–899. doi:10.1086/322084. S2CID 5322035.
- Castro, R.; Clementi, G. L.; MacDonald, Glenn (August 1, 2004). "Investor Protection, Optimal Incentives, and Economic Growth". The Quarterly Journal of Economics. 119 (3): 1131–1175. doi:10.1162/0033553041502171. Archived from the original on February 26, 2024.
- Castro, R.; Clementi, G. L.; MacDonald, Glenn (April 2009). "Investor Protection, Optimal Incentives, and Economic Growth". The Quarterly Journal of Economics. 76 (2): 529–561. doi:10.1162/0033553041502171.
- MacDonald, Glenn; Ryall, Michael D. (October 2004). "How Do Value Creation and Competition Determine Whether a Firm Appropriates Value?". Management Science. 50 (10): 1319–1333. doi:10.1287/mnsc.1030.0152.
- Baranchuk, Nina; MacDonald, Glenn; Yang, Jun (August 30, 2011). "The Economics of Super Managers". Review of Financial Studies. 24 (10): 3321–3368. doi:10.1093/rfs/hhr059.
- MacDonald, Glenn; Ryall, Michael D. (January 2018). "Do new entrants sustain, destroy, or create guaranteed profitability?". Strategic Management Journal. 39 (6): 1630–1649. doi:10.1002/smj.2770.
