= Gabri Izquier =

Spanish footballer

Gabri
Personal information
- Full name: Gabriel Izquier Artiles
- Date of birth: 29 April 1993 (age 33)
- Place of birth: Las Palmas, Spain
- Height: 1.72 m (5 ft 8 in)
- Position: Left back

Team information
- Current team: Hibernians
- Number: 18

Youth career
- Mallorca

Senior career*
Years	Team	Apps	(Gls)
2010–2015	Mallorca B	68	(5)
2012–2013	→ Llosetense (loan)	15	(3)
2015	Mallorca	1	(0)
2015–2016	Barakaldo	34	(2)
2016–2017	Levante B	10	(1)
2017	Barakaldo	12	(2)
2017–2018	Badajoz	19	(0)
2018	Villa Santa Brígida	14	(0)
2019	Teruel	7	(0)
2019–	Hibernians	105	(2)
- * Club domestic league appearances and goals as of 13 May 2024

Gabriel Izquier Artiles (born 29 April 1993), commonly known as Gabri, is a Spanish footballer who plays for Maltese club Hibernians F.C. as a defender.

== Club career ==
Born in Las Palmas, Canary Islands, Gabri graduated from RCD Mallorca's youth system, and made his senior debuts with the reserves in 2010, while still a junior. In the 2012 summer he was loaned to CD Llosetense, returning to the Bermellones in the following year.

Gabri made his first team debut on 7 June 2015, starting in a 0–2 away loss against CD Mirandés in the Segunda División championship. On 3 August, he moved to Segunda División B side Barakaldo CF.

On 16 August 2016 Gabri signed for another reserve team, Atlético Levante UD also in the third tier.
