= Eme Freethinker =

Dominican-born street artist

Jesús Cruz Artiles (born 11 September 1979), known professionally as Eme Freethinker, (Note: In this pseudonym, the forename is Eme and the surname is Freethinker.) is a Dominican-born street artist based in Berlin, Germany. Described as an artivist, his work primarily consists of graffiti commenting on social and political events.

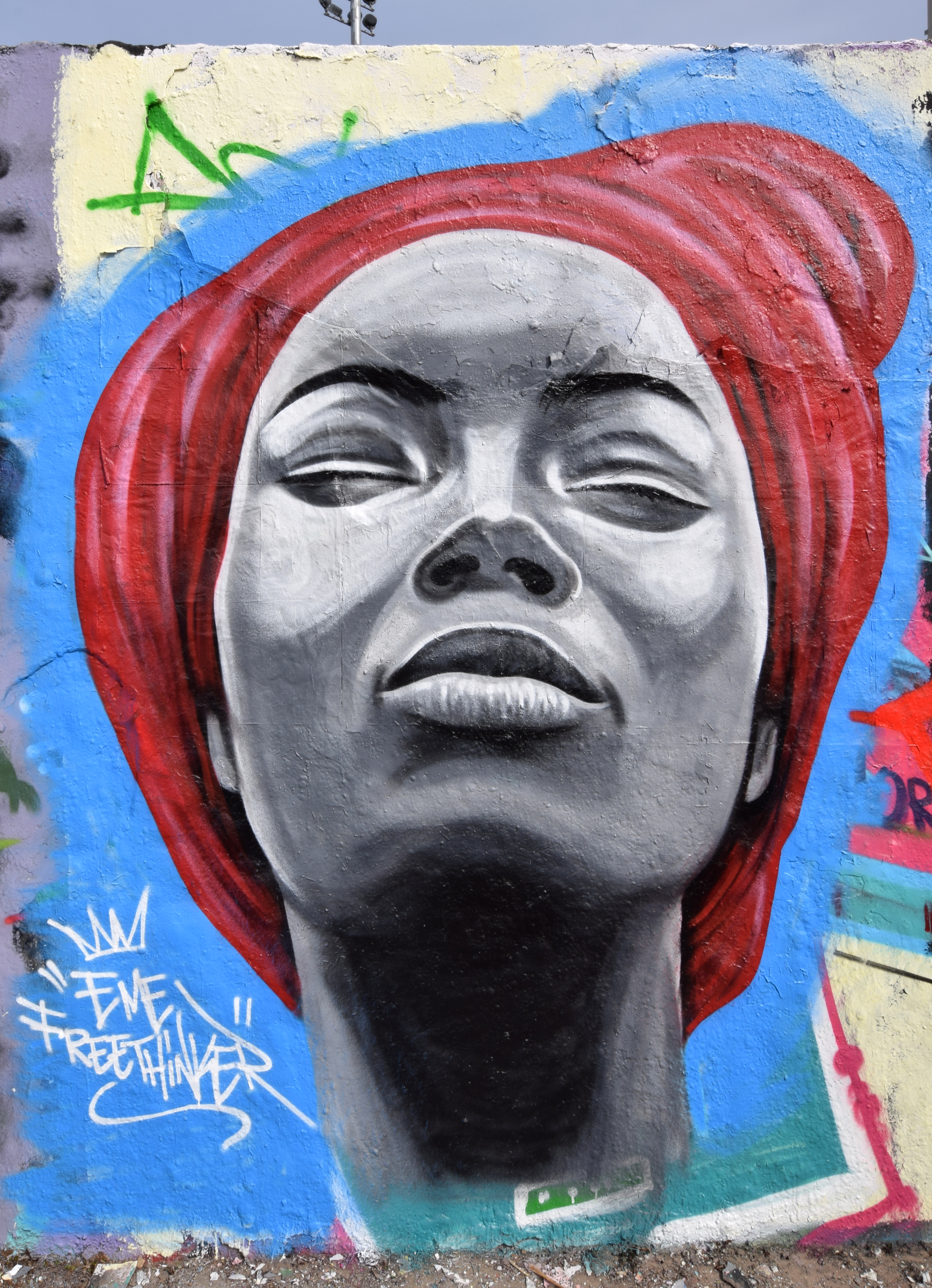
Mural by Eme Freethinker in the Mauerpark

Jesús Cruz Artiles was born in the Dominican Republic on 11 September 1979. In his hometown of Santo Domingo, he witnessed an extrajudicial killing by police as a teenager. This experience deeply affected him emotionally and likely influenced his art to incorporate themes of social struggle.

Following George Floyd's murder by police in May 2020, which reminded him of the killing he had seen before, Eme Freethinker dedicated a mural to Floyd in Berlin's Mauerpark. The mural, painted on one of the remaining sections of the Berlin Wall, is a portrait of Floyd alongside the words "I can't breathe" which serves as a memorial to him. He further painted portraits of other famous Black Americans there, including Malcolm X, Martin Luther King Jr., Angela Davis, Jean-Michel Basquiat and Prince.

Freethinker, who is based in Berlin, had previously painted on the wall satirical murals of the 2020 toilet paper shortage featuring Gollum. Another work depicts CCP general secretary Xi Jinping and American president Donald Trump kissing each other in facemasks, satirizing China–United States relations during the COVID-19 pandemic. In the wake of the 2022 Russian invasion of Ukraine, he created an anti-war wall mural depicting a Ukrainian and Russian child embracing one another. A month later, he created a mural parodying the Chris Rock–Will Smith slapping incident.
