= Democratic Women's Caucus =

- Chair: Teresa Leger Fernández (NM–3)
- Vice Chair: Hillary Scholten (MI–3); Emilia Sykes (OH–13)
- Founded: 2005 (informal); 2010 (formal)
- National affiliation: Democratic Party
- Seats in the House: 96 / 435
- Seats in the House Democratic Caucus: 96 / 212

Website
- democraticwomenscaucus.house.gov

The Democratic Women's Caucus (DWC) is a congressional caucus of the women members of the House Democratic Caucus. Established informally as the Democratic Women's Working Group (DWWG) in 2005, before the DWWG became a more organized group in 2010. It's described as formalizing its mission in 2013 and renaming as the Democratic Women's Caucus in 2019. The lead Democrat on the Congressional Caucus for Women's Issues was the chair or a co-chair of the DWC until 2021.

== List of chairs ==
Start	End	Chair(s)	State
January 3, 2005	January 3, 2007	Hilda Solis	CA
January 3, 2007	January 3, 2009	Lois Capps	CA
January 3, 2009	October 5, 2010	Jan Schakowsky	IL
October 5, 2010	January 3, 2011	Gwen Moore; Jan Schakowsky	WI; IL
January 3, 2011	January 3, 2013	Gwen Moore; Debbie Wasserman Schultz	WI; FL
January 3, 2013	January 3, 2015	Donna Edwards	MD
January 3, 2015	January 3, 2017	Doris Matsui	CA
January 3, 2017	January 3, 2019	Lois Frankel	FL
January 3, 2019	January 3, 2023	Lois Frankel	FL
January 3, 2019	January 3, 2023	Brenda Lawrence	MI
January 3, 2019	January 3, 2023	Jackie Speier	CA
January 3, 2023	January 3, 2025	Lois Frankel	FL
January 3, 2025	present	Teresa Leger Fernández	NM

== See also ==
- Congressional Caucus for Women's Issues
- Congressional Caucus on Black Women and Girls
- Congressional Caucus for the Equal Rights Amendment
- Black Maternal Health Caucus
- Republican Women's Caucus
