= Congressional Caucus on Black Women and Girls =

Congressional caucus advocating for Black women and girls in the United States

The Congressional Caucus on Black Women & Girls
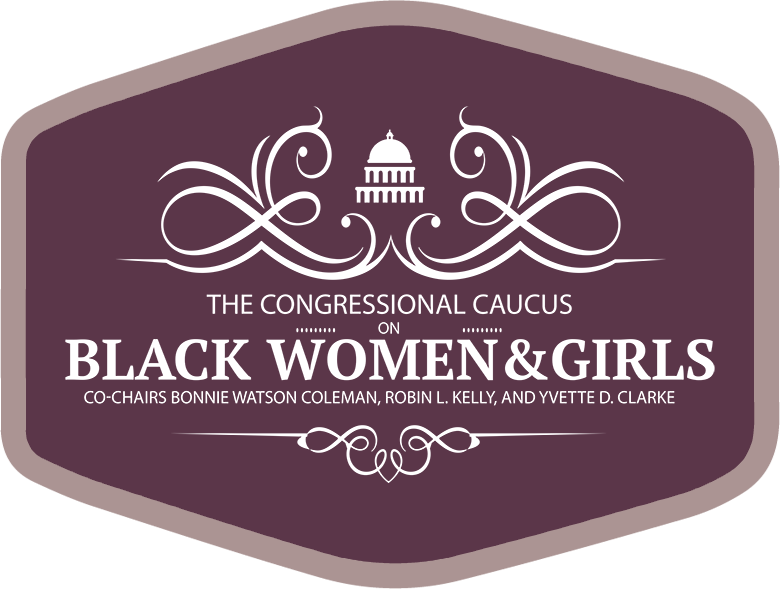
- Co-Chairs: Bonnie Watson Coleman (NJ–12); Robin Kelly (IL–2); Yvette Clarke (NY–9)
- Founded: March 29, 2016; 10 years ago

Website
- watsoncoleman.house.gov/cbwgcaucus/

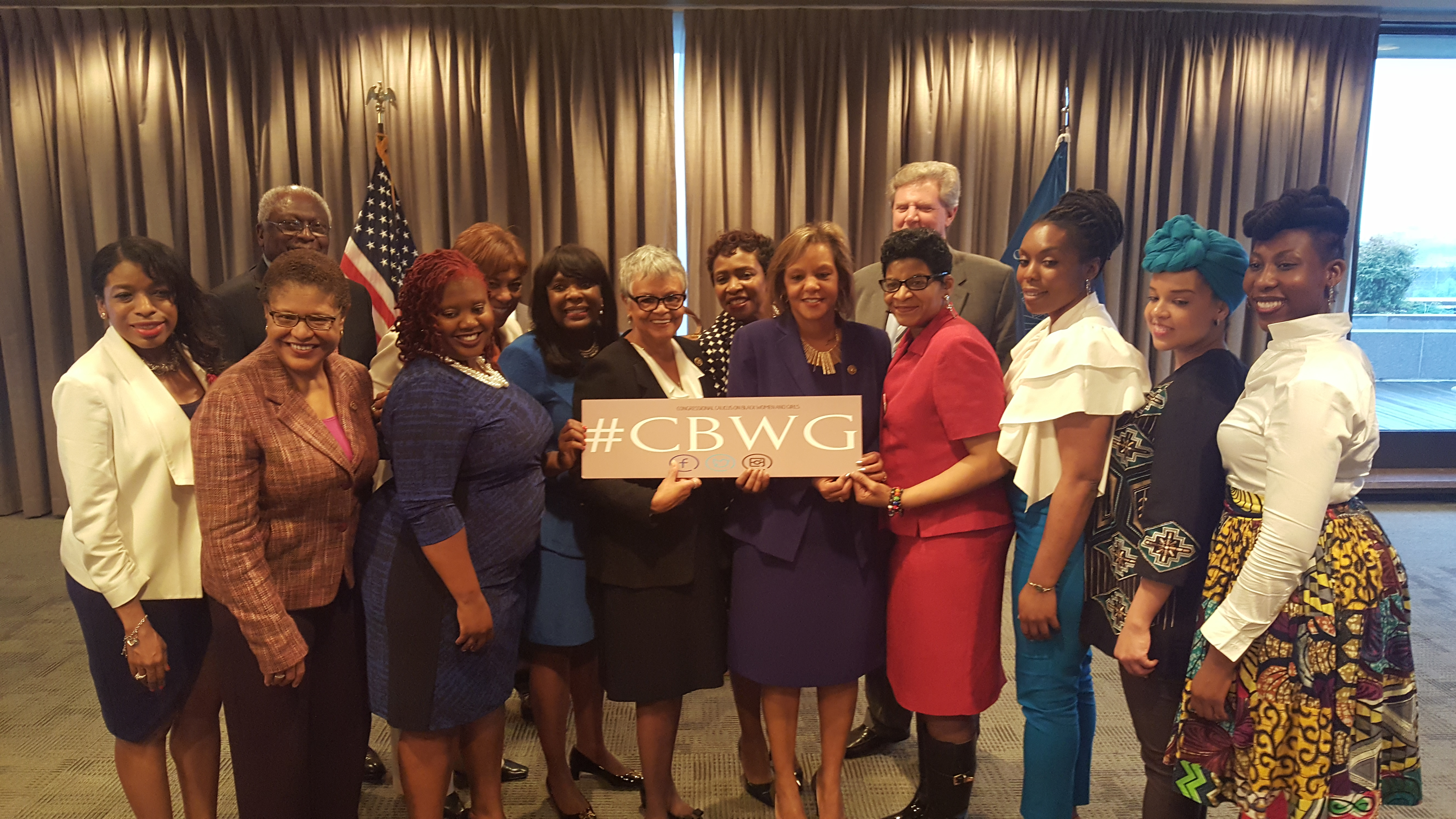
The launch of the Congressional Caucus on Black Women and Girls.

The Congressional Caucus on Black Women and Girls is a United States congressional caucus founded on March 29, 2016 to advance issues and legislation important to the welfare of women and girls of African descent.

== Founding ==
In response to the death of Sandra Bland, the caucus was inspired and created by the #SheWoke Committee: Ifeoma Ike, Esq., Nakisha M. Lewis, Sharon Copper (sister of Sandra Bland), Tiffany Hightower, Shambulia Gadsden Sams, Sharisse "She-Salt" Stancil-Ashford, and Avis Jones-DeWeever, Ph.D. – seven leading black women activists and members of the "Divine 9's" historically Black sororities who consistently advocate for the global equity of black women and girls.

== See also ==
- Congressional Black Caucus
- Congressional Caucus for Women's Issues
- Democratic Women's Caucus
