= Congressional caucus =

Group of members of the US Congress

A congressional caucus is a group of members of the United States Congress that meet to pursue common legislative objectives. Formally, caucuses are formed as congressional member organizations (CMOs) through the United States House of Representatives and the United States Senate and governed under the rules of these chambers. In addition to the term "caucus", they are sometimes called conferences (especially Republican ones), coalitions, study groups, task forces, or working groups. Many other countries use the term parliamentary group; the Parliament of the United Kingdom has many all-party parliamentary groups.

== Activities ==
CMOs may hold press conferences and committee-like hearings (often called ad-hoc or shadow hearings) to promote topics of interest to the caucus. CMOs may also lend the caucus name to approved third parties outside of Congress, such as think tanks and political action committees, to promote such topics as well as endorse congressional candidates.

== Types ==
=== Party caucuses and conferences in the United States Congress ===
The largest caucuses are the party caucuses comprising all members of one house from one party (either the Democrats or the Republicans) in addition to any independent members who may caucus with either party. These are the House Democratic Caucus, House Republican Conference, Senate Democratic Caucus and Senate Republican Conference. The caucuses meet regularly in closed sessions for both the House of Representatives and the Senate to set legislative agendas, select committee members and chairs and hold elections to choose various floor leaders. They also oversee the four Hill committees, political party committees that work to elect members of their own party to Congress.

=== Ideological conferences ===
US House of Representatives Caucuses 2025 Democratic Caucus (214) Congressional Progressive Caucus: 64 seats NDC and CPC: 30 seats New Democrat Coalition: 77 seats BDC and NDC: 6 seats Blue Dog Coalition: 4 seats Other Democrats: 31 seats Vacant (2) Vacant (2) Republican Conference (219) Other Republicans: 2 seats Republican Governance Group: 21 seats RGG and RSC: 25 seats (Note: The Republican Study Committee no longer publishes a detailed member roster and the actual count may therefore be higher.) Republican Study Committee: 138 seats RSC and Freedom Caucus: 25 seats (Note: The Freedom caucus does not publish its member roster and the actual count may therefore be higher.) Freedom Caucus: 9 seats

Ideological congressional caucuses represent factions within a political party. These congressional caucuses help congregate and advance the ideals of more focused ideologies within the two major big-tent political parties. Some caucuses are organized factions with a common ideological orientation. Most ideological caucuses are confined to the House of Representatives. The rosters of large caucuses are usually listed publicly. Members of Congress are not restricted to a single ideological caucus, creating overlaps between the organizations. Some ideological caucuses exercise influence akin to that of whips.

=== Racial and ethnic caucuses ===
Among the most visible caucuses are those composed of members sharing the same race or ethnic group. The most high profile of these represent people of color. The Congressional Black Caucus, Congressional Hispanic Caucus, and the Congressional Asian Pacific American Caucus also form the Congressional Tri Caucus when they sit together.

- The Congressional Black Caucus for African-Americans
- The two Hispanic caucuses:
  - The Congressional Hispanic Caucus for Hispanic Democrats only (Hispanic Republicans are barred from membership per 2000s rule change)
  - The Congressional Hispanic Conference for Hispanic Republicans, who formerly belonged to the Hispanic Caucus but later formed their own caucus due to being barred
- The Congressional Asian Pacific American Caucus represents members who are Asian Americans and Pacific Islanders but are open to other members as well
- The Italian American Congressional Delegation for Italian Americans

=== Gender caucuses ===
Another type of caucus is based on gender, mainly women in Congress.

- Bipartisan Women's Caucus for all women
- Democratic Women's Caucus for Democratic women
- Republican Women's Caucus for Republican women
- Congressional Caucus on Black Women and Girls to represent the interests of women and girls of African descent.

=== ERA Caucus ===
The ERA Caucus (Equal Rights Amendment Caucus) was formed March 28, 2023, by representatives Ayanna Pressley and Cori Bush to affirm the Equal Rights Amendment as the 28th amendment of the U.S. Constitution, having met all requirements of Article V in 2020 with the ratification by the 38th state, Virginia. The Caucus has quickly grown to be one of the largest in the U.S. House of Representatives, standing at 69 members in May 2023.

The ERA Caucus quickly showed their support of the ERA, marching on April 28, 2023 to the Senate in support of S.J. Res 4, the bill to affirm the ERA.

=== Southern Caucus ===
The Southern Caucus was a Senate caucus of Southern Democrats chaired by Richard Russell, which opposed civil rights legislation and formed a vital part of the conservative coalition that dominated the Senate into the 1960s. The tone of the Southern Caucus was to be more moderate and reasonable than the explicit white supremacism of some Southern Senators.

The caucus was where the Southern Manifesto was written which supported the reversal of the landmark Supreme Court 1954 ruling Brown v. Board of Education and was signed by 19 Senators and 82 Representatives.

=== Equality ===
The formation of the Congressional Equality Caucus (formerly the Congressional LGBTQIA+ Equality Caucus) was announced on June 4, 2008, by openly gay members of congress Tammy Baldwin and Barney Frank. The mission of the caucus is to work for LGBTQ rights, the repeal of laws discriminatory against LGBTQ persons, the elimination of hate-motivated violence, and improved health and well-being for all persons, regardless of sexual orientation, gender identity, or gender expression. The caucus serves as a resource for Members of Congress, their staffs, and the public on LGBTQ issues.

The LGBT Equality Caucus admits any member who is willing to advance LGBTQ rights, regardless of their sexual identity or orientation; it has historically been co-chaired by every openly-LGBTQ member of the House. The caucus had 194 members, all of them Democrats, in the 118th United States Congress.

=== Interest group caucuses ===
The most common caucuses consist of members united as an interest group. These are often bi-partisan (comprising both Democrats and Republicans) and bi-cameral (comprising both Representatives and Senators). Examples like the Congressional Bike Caucus works to promote cycling, and the Senate Taiwan Caucus promotes strong relationships with Taiwan.

== Rules ==
The House Committee on House Administration (HCHA) prescribes certain rules for Congressional Member Organizations (CMOs). Each Congress, (Note: Here, Congress refers to an elected set of Congresspersons spanning from one congressional election to the next. The 114th Congress lasted from January 3, 2015 to January 3, 2017.) CMOs must electronically register with the Committee on House Administration, providing the name of the caucus, a statement of purpose, the CMO officers and the employee designated to work on issues related to the CMO.

=== Membership ===
Members of both the House and Senate may participate in CMO, but at least one of the Officers of the CMO must be a Member of the House. The participation of Senators in a CMO does not impact the scope of authorized CMO activities in any regard.

=== Funding and Resources ===
- CMOs have no separate corporate or legal identity and are not employing authorities.
- The Members' Representational Allowance (MRA) may not directly support a CMO as an independent entity and may not be assigned separate office space.
- CMOs may not hold independent events outside of the Washington, D.C. area and the MRA cannot be used to conduct travel in support of a CMO.
- Neither CMOs nor individual Members may accept goods, funds, or services from private organizations or individuals to support the CMO. Members may use personal funds to support the CMO.
- A Member of a CMO, in support of the objectives of that CMO, may utilize employees (including shared employees) and official resources under the control of the Member to assist the CMO in carrying out its legislative objectives, but no employees may be appointed in the name of a CMO. Business cards for individuals who work on CMO issues may refer to the CMO but must make clear that the individual is employed by the Member and not the CMO.

=== Communications ===
- CMOs may not use the Frank (free mailing), nor may a Member lend his or her Frank to a CMO.
- A Member may prepare materials related to CMO issues for dissemination to their colleagues and use official resources for communications on their official social media and websites related to the purpose of a CMO but may not prepare a document representing the CMO as an independent entity. Any such communication must comply with Communications Standards Manual.
- Members may refer to their membership in a CMO on their official stationery. Official funds may not be used to print or pay for stationery for the CMO.
- Members may devote a section of their official website to CMO issues. CMOs may have independent web pages when no official resources are used, outside of staff time, to create and support the site.
- Members may request a URL for a CMO, provided that the request complies with the CMO domain name regulations issued by the Committee. Web pages using such a URL need not have the same design or layout as the Web site of the sponsoring Member.

== See also ==
- All-party parliamentary group
- Caucuses of the United States Congress
- Factions in the Democratic Party (United States)
- Factions in the Republican Party (United States)
