= Kat Cammack =

American politician (born 1988)

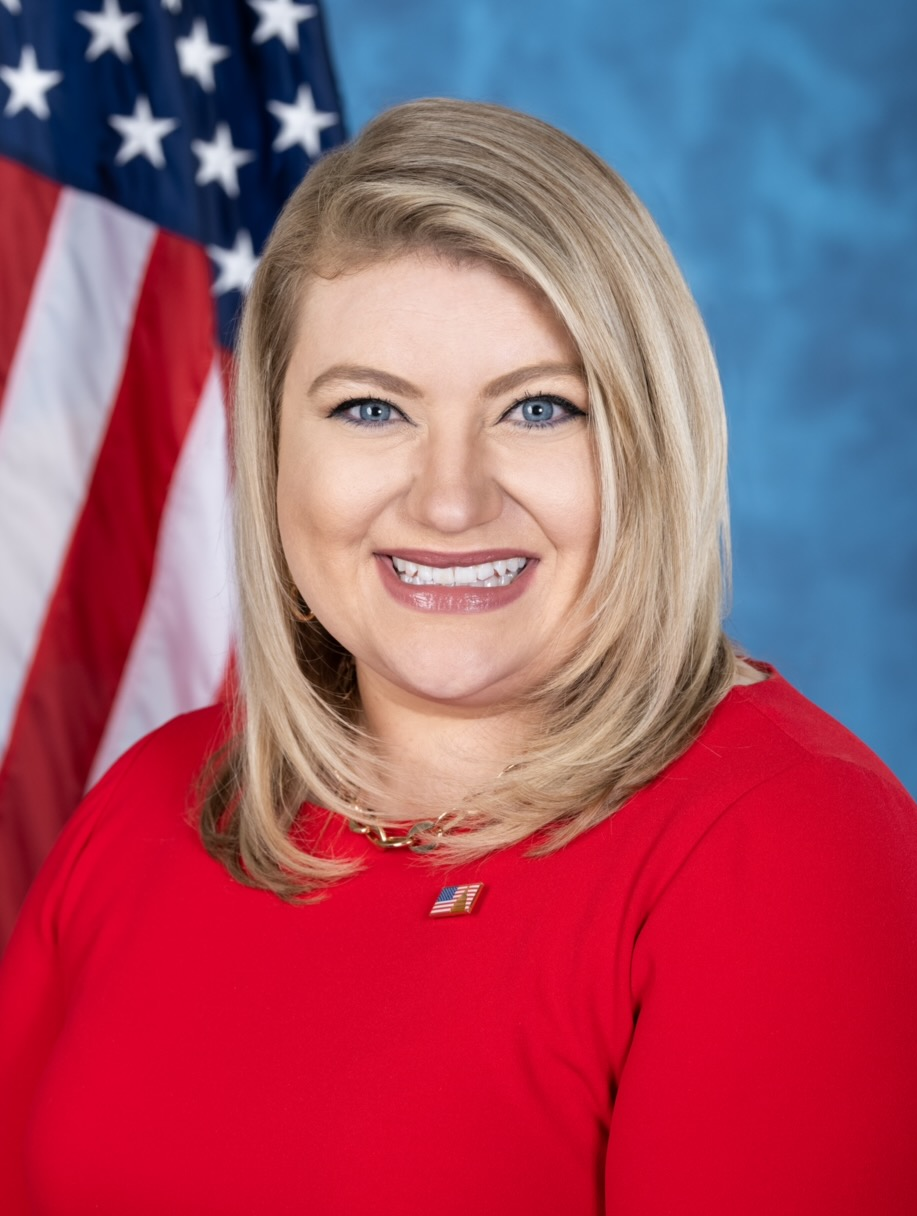
- Official portrait, 2021

Member of the U.S. House of Representatives from Florida's 3rd district
- Incumbent
- Assumed office January 3, 2021
- Preceded by: Ted Yoho

Personal details
- Born: Kathryn Christine Cammack; February 16, 1988 (age 38) Denver, Colorado, U.S.
- Party: Republican
- Spouse: Matthew Harrison (m. 2017)
- Children: 1
- Education: Metropolitan State University of Denver (BA); Naval War College (MA)
- Website: House website Campaign website

Kathryn Christine Cammack (/ˈkæmæk/ KAM-ak; born February 16, 1988) is an American politician serving as the U.S. representative for Florida's 3rd congressional district. A member of the Republican Party, Cammack previously served as deputy chief of staff to her predecessor, Representative Ted Yoho, who retired in 2020. Her congressional district covers a twelve-county area that includes much of North Central Florida.

== Early life and education ==
Kathryn Christine Cammack was born in Denver, Colorado, on February 16, 1988, and raised on a 55-acre cattle ranch. When Cammack was a teenager, her mother spent time in jail for driving under the influence. In 2006, Cammack graduated from Douglas County High School in Castle Rock, Colorado. She earned a Bachelor of Arts degree in international relations from the Metropolitan State University of Denver, and a Master of Science in national defense and strategic studies from the Naval War College. She has said she lived with her mother in an extended-stay motel for four months.

Cammack once claimed that her family was evicted from their cattle ranch "due to an Obama-era housing program"; in fact, the ranch was put up for sale because the family could not afford the mortgage payments.

== Career ==
Cammack has said that her family's experience with the federal Home Affordable Modification Program in 2011 inspired her interest in politics. In 2009, she interned with U.S. representative Mike Coffman. She later joined Ted Yoho's congressional campaign. After Yoho was elected, Cammack served as his deputy chief of staff from 2013 to 2019. In 2019, she left Yoho's office in Washington, D.C., and returned to Florida. Yoho did not seek reelection in 2020, fulfilling his pledge to serve only four terms. Cammack announced her candidacy for Yoho's seat in December 2019.

Cammack also operates an independent political consulting firm. After winning the primary, she was heavily favored to win the general election. In September 2020, Donald Trump endorsed her. After her primary win, Cammack established a leadership PAC.

Cammack ran for chair of the Republican Study Committee but later withdrew her bid for the position and endorsed Kevin Hern. She nominated Kevin McCarthy in the 2023 Speaker of the United States House of Representatives election.

== U.S. House of Representatives ==
=== Elections ===
==== 2020 ====
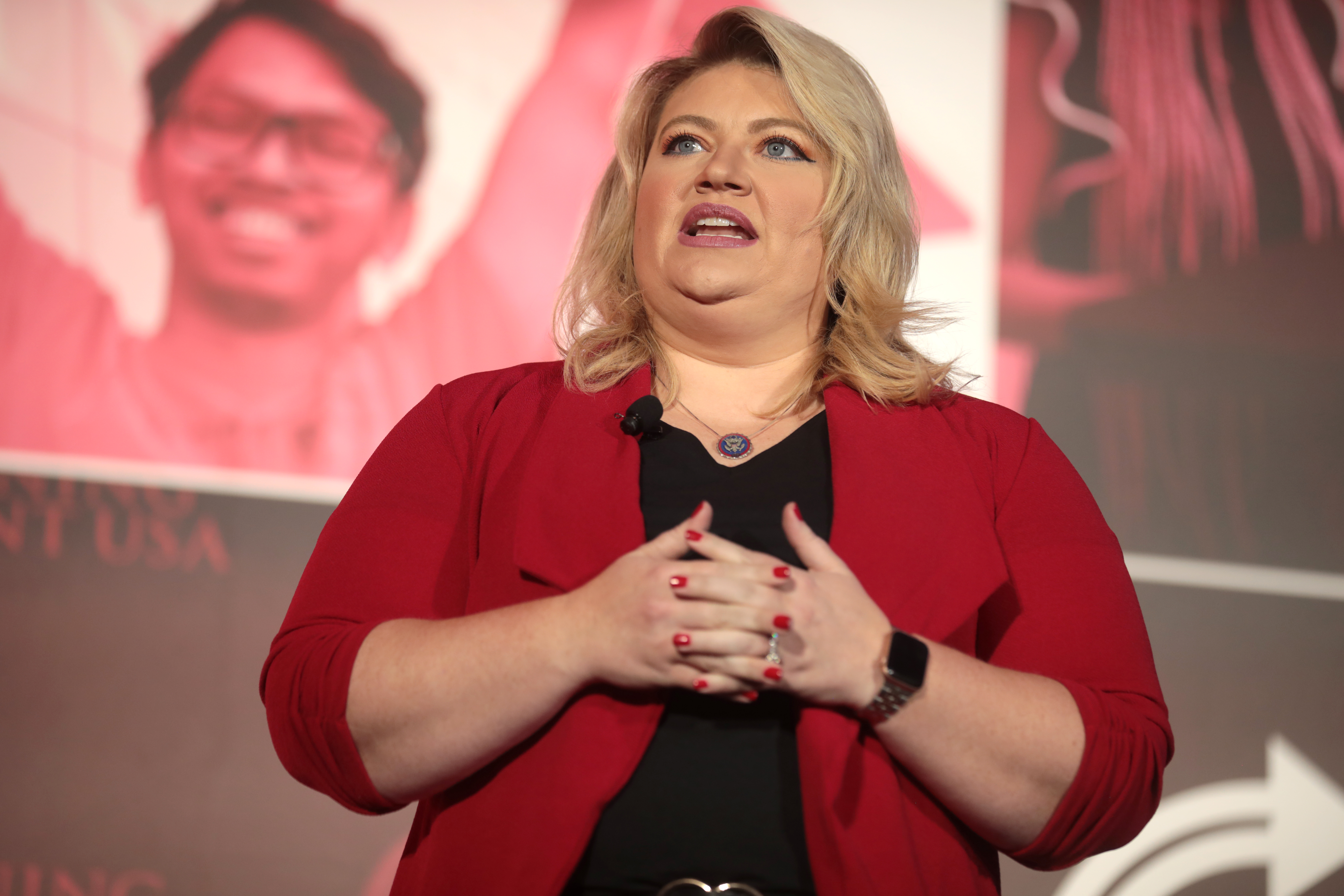
Cammack speaking at a Turning Point USA event in 2021

Cammack defeated Democratic nominee Adam Christensen. She assumed office on January 3, 2021.

==== 2022 ====
Cammack ran for reelection. In the primary, she received 84.8% of the vote to her opponent Justin Waters's 15.2%. A third candidate, Manuel Asensio, dropped out before Election Day. Cammack won the general election with 62.5% of the vote to Democratic nominee Danielle Hawk's 36.3% and NPA Linda Brooks's 1.2%.

=== Committee assignments ===
For the 119th Congress:

- Committee on Agriculture
  - Subcommittee on Commodity Markets, Digital Assets, and Rural Development
- Committee on Energy and Commerce
  - Subcommittee on Commerce, Manufacturing, and Trade
  - Subcommittee on Communications and Technology
  - Subcommittee on Health

=== Caucus memberships ===
- Republican Study Committee
- Campus Free Speech Caucus
- Congressional Pro-Life Caucus
- Congressional Coalition on Adoption
- Congressional Blockchain Caucus
- Congressional Ukraine Caucus

During a speech on the House floor after the sixth failed attempt to elect Kevin McCarthy as House speaker on January 4, 2023, Cammack claimed without evidence that Democrats were drinking alcohol and eating popcorn during the vote. She said, "diversity of thought is a good thing. But they want us divided. They want us to fight each other. That much has been made clear by the popcorn and blankets and alcohol that is comin' over there". She reiterated the claim the next day on Fox News.

== Political positions ==
=== 2020 presidential election and storming of the U.S. Capitol ===
Cammack was one of 139 representatives who voted on January 7, 2021, to overturn the results of the 2020 presidential election. On the House floor, she said the January 6 attacks "furthermore resolved" her objection to the certification process and that, as representatives of the people, members of Congress must stand for a free and fair election. Numerous inquiries have found no evidence that the election was unfree or unfair to an extent that changed its outcome.

=== Abortion ===
Cammack is co-chair of the Congressional Pro-Life Caucus. She believes states should determine their abortion laws, and that abortion should be allowed only in extreme cases in the first trimester. In 2022, she cosponsored a bill to ban abortions nationwide past 15 weeks. During her campaign, she released an advertisement in which she said that, when her mother was pregnant with her, she was advised by doctors to have an abortion, but chose not to.

Cammack had a life-threatening ectopic pregnancy in 2024. Treatment (intramuscular methotrexate) was initially delayed due to confusion about Florida's abortion ban but she was eventually given the necessary treatment as removal of ectopic pregnancy is not considered an abortion under Florida law.

Cammack opposes abortion but "supports exceptions for reported cases of rape and incest in the first trimester and in instances in which the mother’s life is at risk."

=== Congressional term limits ===
In March 2020, Cammack signed the U.S. Term Limits pledge. She said that a "limit on the time an individual can serve brings new ideas to Capitol Hill."

=== Economy ===
Cammack cosponsored a bill to expand federal home loans for first responders and educators. The bill, introduced in May 2021, has not passed out of committee.

=== Education ===
Cammack has called U.S. college campuses "indoctrination camps" and claimed that conservative students are under attack.

=== Energy and environment ===
Cammack cosponsored the PROTECT Florida Act to prohibit oil and gas drilling off the coast of Florida until 2032. The bill, introduced in October 2021, has not passed out of committee. On March 14, 2022, Cammack said the U.S. needs to produce more oil.

=== Firearms ===
Cammack is a board member of the Alachua County Friends of the NRA. In 2020, the NRA endorsed her.

Cammack opposes universal background checks for gun purchases. On the House floor, she called background check legislation "gun-grabber bills".

=== Foreign affairs ===
In June 2021, Cammack was one of 49 House Republicans to vote to repeal the AUMF against Iraq. She voted for the Ukraine Democracy Defense Lend-Lease Act of 2022.

In 2023, Cammack was among 47 Republicans to vote in favor of H.Con.Res. 21 which directed President Joe Biden to remove U.S. troops from Syria within 180 days.

=== Immigration and border security ===
Cammack has supported the construction of a border wall along the Mexico–United States border.

On July 22, 2021, Cammack claimed on the House floor that NGOs transport undocumented migrants around the country at U.S. government expense.

And you ask, how are they getting to our hometowns? On our dime.

The NGOs have government contracts. They buy plane tickets and bus tickets, and then they submit reimbursement from FEMA on our dime in our hometowns unchecked, unvetted, and coming to a town near you. Every town in America is a border town.

And as they are on these planes, do they have to show ID? No. No, they do not, because TSA has special guidance that these people are not subject to the same requirements that every other American is when they board an airplane.

— "Congressional Record." Congress.gov, Library of Congress, 5 January 2023, https://www.congress.gov/congressional-record/volume-167/issue-129/house-section/article/H3826-2.

During the 2022 United States infant formula shortage, Cammack criticized the Biden administration for sending baby formula to detention facilities on the U.S.–Mexico border. White House press secretary Jen Psaki said that under the Flores Settlement Agreement, the U.S. is required to provide adequate and age-appropriate food, "hence formula for kids under the age of 1." During an interview with Sean Hannity on Fox News, Cammack showed pictures of baby formula she said she had received from a CBP agent. Tommy Christopher wrote that some of the images used in Cammack's interview with Hannity were not of baby formula but of powdered milk for children older than one. Hannity later acknowledged on Twitter that two of the pictures he aired during Cammack's appearance were milk products for children over one.

=== Israel ===
Cammack voted to provide Israel with support following the October 7 attacks.

=== Law enforcement ===
Cammack has said it is reassuring that the Capitol Police are expanding into Florida and will work with local law enforcement.

=== LGBT rights ===
Cammack has called the Equality Act—a bill that would amend the Civil Rights Act of 1964 (including titles II, III, IV, VI, VII, and IX) to prohibit discrimination on the basis of sex, sexual orientation and gender identity in employment, housing, public accommodations, education, federally funded programs, credit, and jury service—"a farce that will strip people of faith and private organizations of the right to decide for themselves how to live, work, and conduct business". She voted against the act and numerous other protections for LGBTQ Americans during her time in Congress. On July 19, 2022, Cammack and 46 other Republican representatives voted for the Respect for Marriage Act, which would repeal the Defense of Marriage Act and codify the right to same-sex marriage in federal law. Cammack wrote that she supported the bill because, under the Fourteenth Amendment, the law cannot treat one group of citizens differently from another.

=== Fiscal Responsibility Act of 2023 ===
Cammack was among the 71 House Republicans who voted against final passage of the Fiscal Responsibility Act of 2023, which suspends the debt limit until January 2025.

=== Veterans ===
Cammack voted against the Honoring our PACT Act of 2022 which expanded VA benefits to veterans exposed to toxic chemicals during their military service.

== Personal life ==
Cammack's husband, Matt Harrison, is a firefighter. She is a Protestant.

In May 2024, Cammack went to the emergency room due to an ectopic pregnancy and was initially refused methotrexate treatment (administration of an abortifacient to induce an abortion) due to uncertainty over the rules stipulated in Florida's abortion ban. Cammack said that Democrats had "scared" medical professionals into confusion about their medical responsibilities (Note: The Heartbeat Protection Act, passed by Florida Republicans, went into effect on May 1, 2024. The law is unambiguous that if a medical professional performs an abortion, they will lose their medical license and face criminal prosecution.) and that she didn't get an abortion, regardless of the legal intervention required for her medical treatment in this situation. After advocating on her behalf, she received the medication hours later. In March 2025, Cammack announced that she was pregnant again. She gave birth to a daughter in August 2025.

== See also ==
- Women in the United States House of Representatives

U.S. House of Representatives
Preceded by Ted Yoho	Member of the U.S. House of Representatives from Florida's 3rd congressional district 2021–present	Incumbent
Preceded by Madeleine Dean	Chair of the Congressional Women's Caucus; 2023–2025	Succeeded by Monica De La Cruz
Party political offices
Vacant Title last held by Renee Ellmers; 2017 as Chair of the Republican Women's Policy Committee	Chair of the Republican Women's Caucus; 2025–present Served alongside: Katie Britt	Incumbent
U.S. order of precedence (ceremonial)
Preceded by Lauren Boebert	United States representatives by seniority 244th	Succeeded by Andrew Clyde
