= United States House Energy Subcommittee on Commerce, Manufacturing, and Trade =

American legislative committee

Subcommittee of Committee on Energy and Commerce
- Active United States House of Representatives; 119th Congress

Leadership
- Chair: Gus Bilirakis (R)
- Ranking Member: Jan Schakowsky (D)

Structure
- Seats: 23 (23 currently filled) 13/13 10/10
- Political parties: Majority (13): Republican (13); Minority (10): Democratic (10)

Meeting place
- 2125, Rayburn House Office Building; Washington, D.C. 20515

Phone number
- (202)-225-3641

The House Subcommittee on Commerce, Manufacturing, and Trade is a subcommittee within the United States House Committee on Energy and Commerce. The subcommittee was known as the Subcommittee on Consumer Protection and Commerce until the 118th Congress, when data policy was transferred to it from the Subcommittee on Communications and Technology. It was known as the Subcommittee on Innovation, Data and Commerce until the 119th Congress.

== Jurisdiction ==
The committee has jurisdiction over issues affecting interstate and foreign commerce, including all trade matters within the jurisdiction of the full committee; regulation of commercial practices at the Federal Trade Commission, including sports-related matters; consumer affairs and consumer protection, including privacy matters generally; consumer product safety at the Consumer Product Safety Commission; product liability; and motor vehicle safety; Regulation of travel, tourism, and time. Within these specific areas, the committee also has jurisdiction over all aspects related to Homeland security, including cybersecurity.

== Members, 119th Congress ==
Majority	Minority
Gus Bilirakis, Florida, Chair; Russ Fulcher, Idaho, Vice Chair; Diana Harshbarger, Tennessee; Kat Cammack, Florida; Jay Obernolte, California; John James, Michigan; Cliff Bentz, Oregon; Erin Houchin, Indiana; Russell Fry, South Carolina; Laurel Lee, Florida; Tom Kean Jr., New Jersey; Gabe Evans, Colorado; Craig Goldman, Texas	Jan Schakowsky, Illinois, Ranking Member; Kathy Castor, Florida; Darren Soto, Florida; Lori Trahan, Massachusetts; Kevin Mullin, California; Yvette Clarke, New York; Debbie Dingell, Michigan; Marc Veasey, Texas; Robin Kelly, Illinois; Kim Schrier, Washington
Ex officio
Brett Guthrie, Kentucky	Frank Pallone, New Jersey

== Historical membership rosters ==
=== 118th Congress ===
Majority	Minority
Gus Bilirakis, Florida, Chair; Tim Walberg, Michigan, Vice Chair; Larry Bucshon, Indiana; Jeff Duncan, South Carolina; Neal Dunn, Florida; Debbie Lesko, Arizona; Greg Pence, Indiana; Kelly Armstrong, North Dakota; Rick Allen, Georgia; Russ Fulcher, Idaho; Diana Harshbarger, Tennessee; Kat Cammack, Florida	Jan Schakowsky, Illinois, Ranking Member; Kathy Castor, Florida; Debbie Dingell, Michigan; Robin Kelly, Illinois; Lisa Blunt Rochester, Delaware; Darren Soto, Florida; Lori Trahan, Massachusetts; Yvette Clarke, New York
Ex officio
Cathy McMorris Rodgers, Washington	Frank Pallone, New Jersey

=== 117th Congress ===
Majority	Minority
Jan Schakowsky, Illinois, Chair; Bobby Rush, Illinois; Kathy Castor, Florida; Lori Trahan, Massachusetts; Jerry McNerney, California; Yvette Clarke, New York; Tony Cárdenas, California, Vice Chair; Debbie Dingell, Michigan; Robin Kelly, Illinois; Darren Soto, Florida; Kathleen Rice, New York; Angie Craig, Minnesota; Lizzie Fletcher, Texas	Gus Bilirakis, Florida, Ranking Member; Fred Upton, Michigan; Bob Latta, Ohio; Brett Guthrie, Kentucky; Larry Bucshon, Indiana; Neal Dunn, Florida; Greg Pence, Indiana; Debbie Lesko, Arizona; Kelly Armstrong, North Dakota
Ex officio
Frank Pallone, New Jersey	Cathy McMorris Rodgers, Washington

=== 116th Congress ===
Majority	Minority
Jan Schakowsky, Illinois, Chair; Kathy Castor, Florida; Marc Veasey, Texas; Robin Kelly, Illinois; Tom O'Halleran, Arizona; Ben Ray Luján, New Mexico; Tony Cárdenas, California; Lisa Blunt Rochester, Delaware; Darren Soto, Florida; Bobby Rush, Illinois; Doris Matsui, California; Jerry McNerney, California; Debbie Dingell, Michigan	Cathy McMorris Rodgers, Washington, Ranking Member; Fred Upton, Michigan; Michael C. Burgess, Texas; Bob Latta, Ohio; Brett Guthrie, Kentucky; Larry Bucshon, Indiana; Richard Hudson, North Carolina; Buddy Carter, Georgia; Greg Gianforte, Montana
Ex officio
Frank Pallone, New Jersey	Greg Walden, Oregon

=== 115th Congress ===
Majority	Minority
Bob Latta, Ohio, Chair; Gregg Harper, Mississippi, Vice Chair; Fred Upton, Michigan; Michael C. Burgess, Texas; Leonard Lance, New Jersey; Brett Guthrie, Kentucky; David McKinley, West Virginia; Adam Kinzinger, Illinois; Gus Bilirakis, Florida; Larry Bucshon, Indiana; Markwayne Mullin, Oklahoma; Mimi Walters, California; Ryan Costello, Pennsylvania	Jan Schakowsky, Illinois, Ranking Member; Ben Ray Luján, New Mexico; Yvette Clarke, New York; Tony Cárdenas, California; Debbie Dingell, Michigan; Doris Matsui, California; Peter Welch, Vermont; Joseph P. Kennedy III, Massachusetts; Gene Green, Texas
Ex officio
Greg Walden, Oregon	Frank Pallone, New Jersey
