= Congressional Caucus for the Equal Rights Amendment =

Caucus in the US House of Representatives

The Congressional Caucus for the Equal Rights Amendment is a congressional caucus affiliated with the Democratic Party in the United States House of Representatives.

== History ==
The caucus was launched 100 years after the Equal Rights Amendment (ERA) was first introduced in Congress. The Equal Rights Amendment Caucus "partner[s] with advocates, activists, scholars, organizers, and public figures to establish a constitutional right to gender equality, and raise awareness". The caucus works to affirm the ERA as the 28th Amendment to the Constitution of the United States.

== Membership ==
Membership:

- Cori Bush (co-chair) (D, MO-1) (defeated for renomination in 2024)
- Ayanna Pressley (co-chair) (D, MA-7)
- Becca Balint (vice-chair) (D, VT)
- Nanette Barragán (vice-chair) (D, CA-44)
- Judy Chu (vice-chair) (D, CA-28)
- Madeleine Dean (vice-chair) (D, PA-4)
- Lois Frankel (vice-chair) (D, FL-22)
- Maxwell Frost (vice-chair) (D, FL-10)
- Sylvia Garcia (vice-chair) (D, TX-29)
- Steven Horsford (vice-chair) (D, NV-4)
- Sydney Kamlager-Dove (vice-chair) (D, CA-37)
- Barbara Lee (vice-chair) (D, CA-12) (retired from Congress)
- Summer Lee (vice-chair) (D, PA-12)
- Ted Lieu (vice-chair) (D, CA-36)
- Jennifer McClellan (vice-chair) (D, VA-4)
- Mark Pocan (vice-chair) (D, WI-2)
- Delia Ramirez (vice-chair) (D, IL-3)
- Jamie Raskin (vice-chair) (D, MD-8)
- Abigail Spanberger (vice-chair) (D, VA-7)
- Jonathan Jackson (vice-chair) (D, IL-1)
- Alma Adams (D, NC-12)
- Don Beyer (D, VA-8)
- Earl Blumenauer (D, OR-3) (retired from Congress)
- Suzanne Bonamici (D, OR-1)
- Shontel Brown (D, OH-11)
- Nikki Budzinski (D, IL-13)
- Salud Carbajal (D, CA-24)
- Andre Carson (D, IN-7)
- Sheila Cherfilus-McCormick (D, FL-20) (resigned from Congress)
- Yvette Clarke (D, NY-9)
- Emanuel Cleaver (MO-5)
- Gerald Connolly (VA-11)
- Jasmine Crockett (D, TX-30)
- Mark DeSaulnier (D, CA-10)
- Lloyd Doggett (D, TX-37)
- Adriano Espaillat (NY-13)
- Valerie Foushee (NC-4)
- Josh Gottheimer (NJ-5)
- Glenn Ivey (MD-4)
- Sara Jacobs (D, CA-51)
- Hank Johnson (GA-4)
- Ro Khanna (D, CA-17)
- Andy Kim (D, NJ-3) (elected to the Senate in 2024)
- Susie Lee (D, NV-3)
- Betty McCollum (MN-4)
- Morgan McGarvey (KY-3)
- James McGovern (MA-2)
- Joseph Morelle (NY-25)
- Frank J. Mrvan (IN-1)
- Kevin Mullin (CA-15)
- Jerrold Nadler (D, NY-12)
- Donald Norcross (NJ-1)
- Eleanor Norton (DC)
- Alexandria Ocasio-Cortez (D, NY-14)
- Ilhan Omar (D, MN-5)
- Mary Peltola (D, AK) (defeated for reelection in 2024)
- Katie Porter (D, CA-47) (ran unsuccessfully for U.S. Senate in 2024)
- Gregorio Sablan (MP)
- Jan Schakowsky (IL-9)
- Adam Schiff (D, CA-30)
- Darren Soto (FL-9)
- Dina Titus (NV-1)
- Rashida Tlaib (D, MI-12)
- Jill Tokuda (HI-2)
- Lori Trahan (MA-3)
- David Trone (MD-6) (retired from Congress)
- Maxine Waters (D, CA-43)
- Bonnie Watson Coleman (NJ-12)
- Nikema Williams (GA-5)
- Frederica S. Wilson (D, FL-24)
