= Bonnie Watson Coleman =

American politician (born 1945)

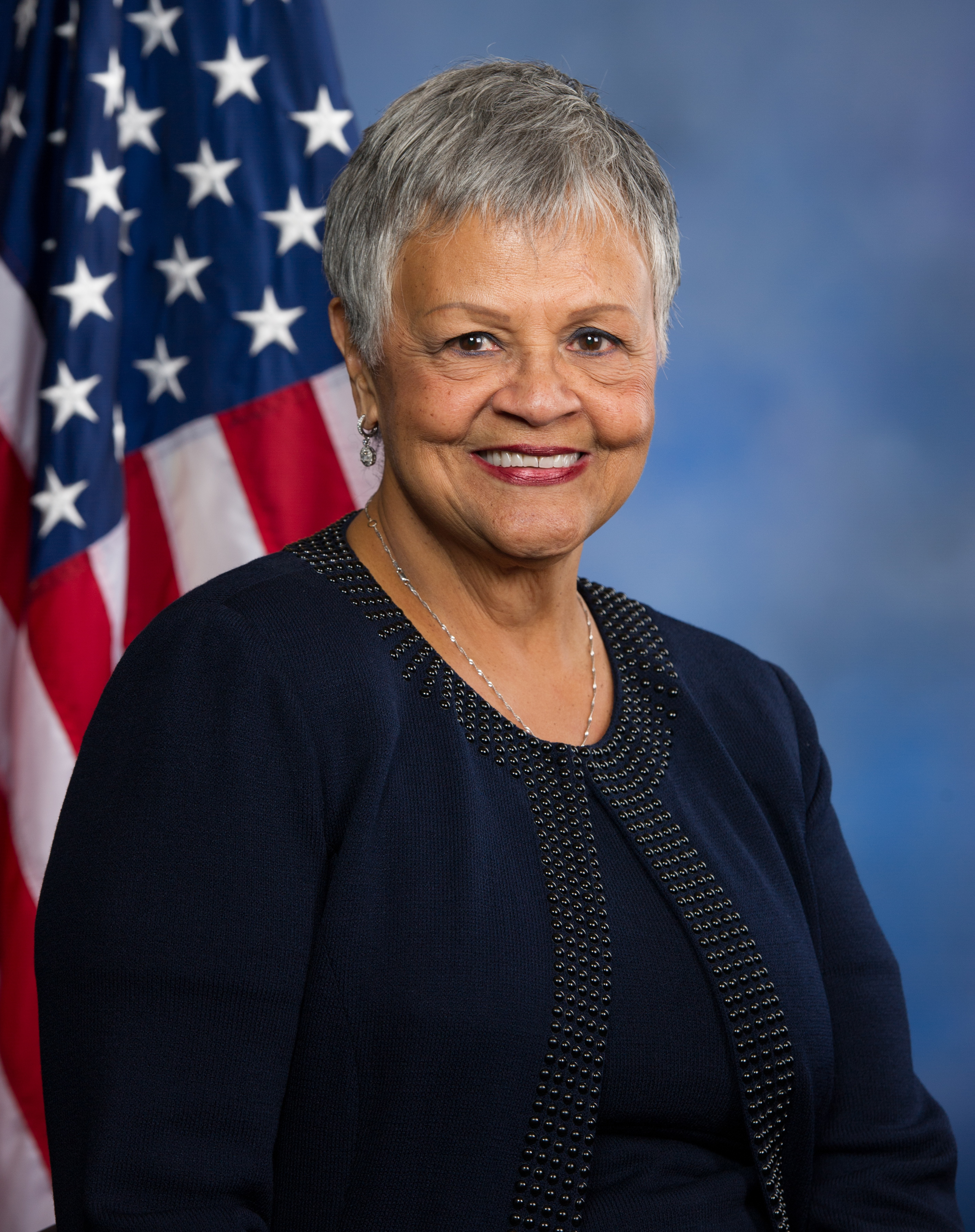
- Official portrait, 2014

Member of the U.S. House of Representatives from New Jersey's 12th district
- Incumbent
- Assumed office January 3, 2015
- Preceded by: Rush Holt Jr.

Majority Leader of the New Jersey General Assembly
- In office January 12, 2006 – January 12, 2010
- Preceded by: Joseph J. Roberts
- Succeeded by: Joseph Cryan

Chair of the New Jersey Democratic Party
- In office February 4, 2002 – February 17, 2006
- Preceded by: Joseph J. Roberts
- Succeeded by: Joseph Cryan

Member of the New Jersey General Assembly from the 15th district
- In office January 13, 1998 – January 3, 2015 Serving with Reed Gusciora
- Preceded by: Shirley Turner
- Succeeded by: Elizabeth Maher Muoio

Personal details
- Born: Bonnie Marie Watson; February 6, 1945 (age 81) Camden, New Jersey, U.S.
- Party: Democratic
- Spouse: William Coleman (m. 1995)
- Children: 3
- Relatives: John Watson (father)
- Education: Rutgers University, Camden (attended); Thomas Edison State University (BA)
- Website: House website Campaign website

Bonnie Marie Watson Coleman (born February 6, 1945) is an American politician serving as the U.S. representative for New Jersey's 12th congressional district since 2015. A member of the Democratic Party, Watson Coleman is the first African-American woman to represent New Jersey in the U.S. House of Representatives.

Watson Coleman was born in Camden, New Jersey. She attended Rutgers University–Camden before receiving a B.A. from Thomas Edison State College in 1985. Watson Coleman began her career in New Jersey state government, working for the New Jersey State Division on Civil Rights and later serving as director of the Office of Civil Rights, Contract Compliance and Affirmative Action in the New Jersey Department of Transportation. She served in the New Jersey General Assembly for the 15th legislative district from 1998 to 2015. Watson Coleman held the position of Assembly majority leader from 2006 to 2010.

In 2014, Watson Coleman ran for the U.S. House of Representatives in New Jersey's 12th congressional district to succeed retiring Representative Rush Holt. She won the Democratic primary and later the general election, becoming the first African-American woman elected to represent a New Jersey district in Congress. In the House, she is a member of the Congressional Progressive Caucus and the Congressional Black Caucus, among other caucuses. She co-founded the Congressional Caucus on Black Women and Girls in 2016, as well as the America 250 Caucus to help plan activities for America's semiquincentennial commemoration in 2026. On November 10, 2025, she announced that she would not run for reelection in 2026.

== Early life ==
Watson Coleman was born in Camden, New Jersey, on February 6, 1945 and graduated from Ewing High School in 1963.

== Career before elected office ==
Watson Coleman worked for the New Jersey state government for over 28 years before retiring. She began her career in the New Jersey State Division on Civil Rights in Newark as a field representative in the late 1960s. She then joined the Office of Civil Rights, Contract Compliance and Affirmative Action in the New Jersey Department of Transportation, serving as its first director from 1974 to 1980. In 1980, she joined the Department of Community Affairs first as bureau chief before being promoted to assistant commissioner. In this position, she was responsible for the aging, community resources, public guardian, and women divisions. In 1985, she received a B.A. from Thomas Edison State College after briefly attending Rutgers University.

In 1994, she joined her father, John S. Watson, a representative in the New Jersey General Assembly for six terms, in establishing a human resources development firm. However, the partnership was short-lived, as he died in 1996.

Watson Coleman served on the Governing Boards Association of State Colleges from 1987 to 1998 and as its chair from 1991 to 1993. She was a member of the Ewing Township Planning Board from 1996 to 1997, a member of The Richard Stockton College of New Jersey board of trustees from 1981 to 1998 and was its chair from 1990 to 1991.

She has received honorary doctorate degrees from the College of New Jersey, Rider University, and Stockton University.

== New Jersey General Assembly ==
Election results for the 15th legislative district by municipality in 2013, the final campaign that Watson Coleman ran in for Assembly Giordano/Taylor: 50–60% 60–70% Gusciora/Watson Coleman: 50–60% 60–70% 80–90%

In 1998, incumbent Representative Shirley Turner of the 15th district decided to run for the New Jersey Senate. Being the same district her father represented, Watson Coleman joined the race. She and Democrat Reed Gusciora won the election against two Republican candidates. She served the district until 2015, representing Trenton and parts of Mercer and Hunterdon counties. She later became the first African American woman to lead the state party when she was elected chair of the New Jersey Democratic State Committee on February 4, 2002, serving until 2006. Watson Coleman served as Majority Leader of the New Jersey General Assembly from 2006 to 2010.

Her legislative achievements in the assembly include increasing the minimum wage, the Paid Family Leave Act, creating the Office of the Comptroller, and expanding Urban Enterprise Zones. She took an active role in identity theft protection and criminal justice reform to reduce recidivism.

She was a member of the joint legislative investigative committee probing the closing of lanes on the George Washington bridge, later known as Bridgegate. She resigned from the committee in early 2014 after calling for Governor Chris Christie to resign.

== U.S. House of Representatives ==
=== Elections ===
Following the announcement that Congressman Rush Holt would not seek another term in office, Watson Coleman announced her candidacy for the seat in New Jersey's 12th congressional district in early 2014. Several other candidates joined the primary, including senator Linda Greenstein, assemblyman Upendra Chivukula, and resident Andrew Zwicker. The primary was considered competitive between Greenstein and Watson Coleman, with each picking up key local endorsements. On June 3, Watson Coleman won the Democratic primary with 43% of the vote. With 60.9% of the vote, she defeated Republican nominee Alieta Eck and several third party candidates in the November 4 general election Watson Coleman's win made her the first African-American woman elected to represent a New Jersey district in the U.S. House of Representatives.

Watson Coleman ran for reelection in 2016. In the primary, she faced off against Alexander Kucsma, a former mayor and pro-gun, anti-abortion Democrat. She won the primary with 93.6% of the vote. In the general election, she defeated Republican meat wholesaler Steven Uccio with 62.9% of the vote. Watson Coleman spent $630,000 in the race, while Uccio spent none.

In 2018, she ran uncontested in the Democratic primary. She easily won reelection against Republican Daryl Kipnis, receiving 68.7% to 31.3% of the vote. Watson Coleman spent around $828,000 while Kipnis spent around $23,000.

She faced off against perennial candidate Lisa McCormick in the 2020 Democratic primary. McCormick attempted to steal Watson Coleman's identity and used anti-Semitic tropes in her campaign. Watson Coleman won with over 90% of the vote. Watson Coleman later thanked the secretary of state for referring the candidates to the attorney general's office for investigation. She easily won the general election against Republican Mark Razzoli, an Old Bridge Township councilman with 65% of the vote. Watson Coleman spent around $819,000 while Razzoli only spent around $1,100.

In the 2022 primary, she ran uncontested. She defeated Republican Darius Mayfield with 63% of the vote in the general election. She spent around $959,000 while Mayfield spent $259,000.

Watson Coleman won the 2024 Democratic primary against former Princeton school board member Daniel Dart with about 87% of the vote.

In November 2025, Watson Coleman announced that she will not seek re-election to Congress when her term ends at the end of 2026.

=== Tenure ===
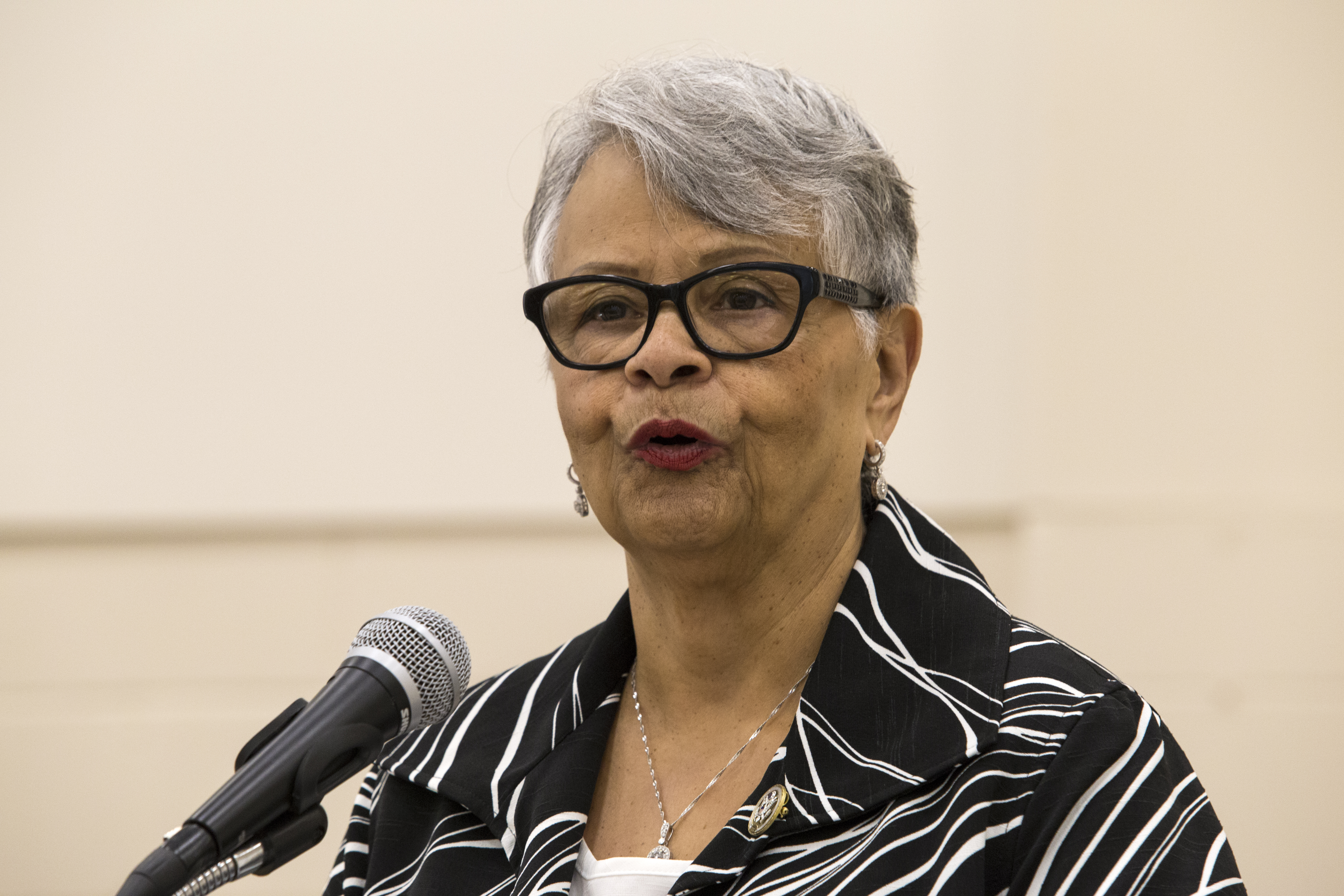
Watson Coleman speaking in 2017 to the New Jersey National Guard

Watson Coleman has been described as a "progressive" and is a member of the Congressional Progressive Caucus. She is a member of the Democratic Party.

During the 114th Congress, as a member of the Homeland Security committee, she introduced the Homeland Security Drone Assessment and Analysis Act to research and mitigate the risks of drones; the House passed the legislation by voice vote. She introduced the Healthy MOM Act to allow women to enroll in, or change their health coverage if they become pregnant. She also introduced the Stop Online Ammunition Sales Act which would require ID confirmation to purchase ammo on the internet. On March 3, 2015, Watson Coleman participated with fellow Democrats in a boycott of Israeli Prime Minister Benjamin Netanyahu's speech to Congress. In March 2016, she co-founded the Congressional Caucus on Black Women and Girls with Representatives Robin Kelly and Yvette D. Clarke to address the socioeconomic issues affecting black women and girls.

In 2017, Watson Coleman introduced the Customer Non-Discrimination Act to prohibit discrimination based on sex, sexual orientation, and gender identity in “public accommodations." That same year, she, alongside Representatives Jerry Nadler and Pramila Jayapal, introduced a resolution to censure President Donald Trump for his remarks at Charlottesville. She introduced the End For-Profit Prisons Act of 2017 to phase out private prison contracts.

In 2019, she voted against a resolution opposing efforts to boycott Israel and the Global Boycott, Divestment, and Sanctions Movement targeting Israel; the resolution passed 398–17. In October 2020, Watson Coleman co-signed a letter to Secretary of State Mike Pompeo that condemned Azerbaijan’s offensive operations against the Armenian-populated enclave of Nagorno-Karabakh, denounced Turkey’s role in the Nagorno-Karabakh conflict, and called for an immediate ceasefire.

Watson Coleman introduced the CROWN Act in 2021 to prohibit hair discrimination; the bill passed the House but died in the Senate; the bill was reintroduced in 2024. In 2022, she and other representatives were arrested at an abortion rights rally outside the Supreme Court. She sponsored the Semiquincentennial Commemorative Coin Act to celebrate America's 250th anniversary. Alongside a group of other representatives, she reintroduced the Protect Black Women and Girls Act to establish a task force to examine the experiences of black women and girls. Watson Coleman has co-sponsored a ceasefire resolution in response to the Gaza war.

In a March 2025 op-ed in Newsweek, Watson Coleman called for an arms embargo on Israel and wrote, “We (the United States) must not fool ourselves. We are not merely witnessing a genocide in Gaza; the United States is participating in it and is complicit.” She emphasized, “As much as we may have claimed to be working toward a ceasefire over the past year, we were feeding the fire that has engulfed Gaza.”

=== Committee assignments ===
- Committee on Appropriations
  - Subcommittee on Labor, Health and Human Services, Education, and Related Agencies
  - Subcommittee on Transportation, Housing and Urban Development, and Related Agencies

=== Caucus memberships ===
Watson Coleman is a Co-founder and Co-chair of the Congressional Caucus on Black Women and Girls and the America 250 Caucus. Prominent caucuses she is a member of are below.

- Black Maternal Health Caucus
- Congressional Taiwan Caucus
- Congressional Progressive Caucus
- Congressional Black Caucus
- Congressional Arts Caucus
- Congressional Asian Pacific American Caucus
- Congressional Caucus for the Equal Rights Amendment
- Congressional Equality Caucus
- Congressional Ukraine Caucus
- Medicare for All Caucus
- Blue Collar Caucus
- Rare Disease Caucus

== Personal life ==
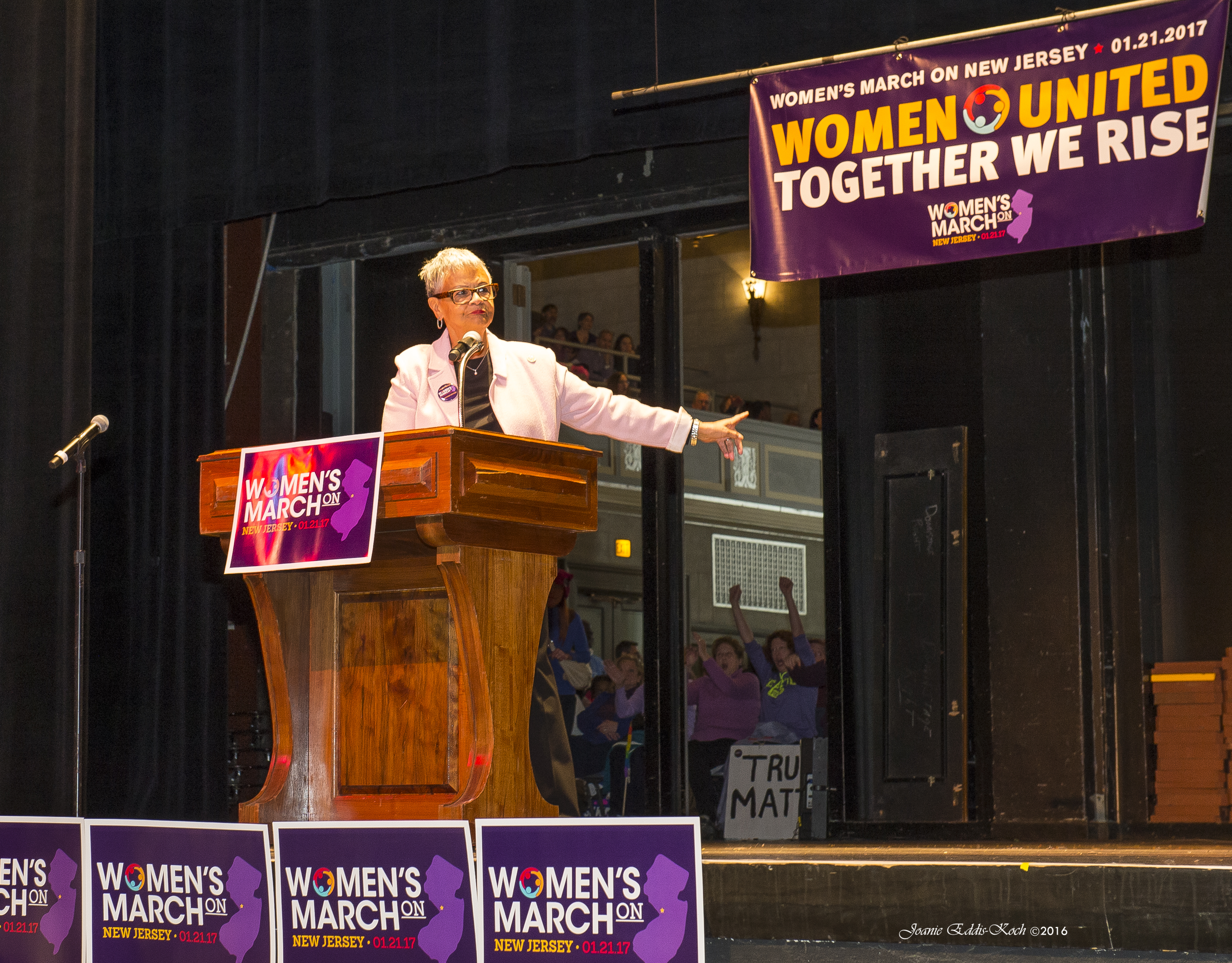
Coleman speaking at the 2017 Women's March in Trenton, New Jersey

In 1972, Watson Coleman married Jim Carter and had one son. They divorced in the early 1980s. In 1995, she married William Coleman. He has two sons from a previous marriage. She is Baptist and resides in Ewing Township.

Two of Watson Coleman's sons, William Carter-Watson and Jared C. Coleman, pleaded guilty to holding up the Kids "R" Us store at Mercer Mall with a handgun as it was about to close on March 12, 2001; they were sentenced to seven years in prison and served five and a half years. An enacted New Jersey law sponsored by Watson Coleman bars employers with more than 15 employees from asking job applicants if they have criminal histories. Watson Coleman argued for the law, saying, "One of the greatest barriers to a second chance in the state of New Jersey is a barrier to employment." In 2014, her son William Carter-Watson was hired by the Mercer County Park Commission as an entry-level laborer. When asked for comment, Brian Hughes, the County Executive, said, "the county has maintained a policy of hiring ex-convicts in search of a second chance".

=== Health ===
In the summer of 2018, Watson Coleman underwent surgery to remove a cancerous tumor. Watson Coleman tested positive for COVID-19 on January 11, 2021. She underwent back surgery to treat lumbar spinal stenosis in June 2024.

== Electoral history ==
New Jersey's 12th congressional district: Results 2014–2024
Year	Democratic	Votes	Pct	Republican	Votes	Pct	3rd Party	Party	Votes	Pct	3rd Party	Party	Votes	Pct	Other
2014	Bonnie Watson Coleman	90,430	60.9%	Alieta Eck	54,168	36.5%	Don Dezarn	Independent	1,330	0.9%	Steven Welzer	Green	890	0.6%	(Note: Independent candidates Kenneth J. Cody, Jack Freudenheim and Allen J. Cannon received 0.4%, 0.4% and 0.3% respectively.)
2016	Bonnie Watson Coleman	181,430	62.9%	Steven J. Uccio	92,407	32.0%	R. Edward Forchion	Independent	6,094	2.1%	Robert Shapiro	Independent	2,775	1.0%	(Note: Libertarian candidate Thomas Fitzpatrick, Green candidate Steven Welzer and Independent candidate Michael R. Bollentin received 0.9%, 0.7% and 0.4% respectively.)
2018	Bonnie Watson Coleman	173,334	68.7%	Daryl Kipnis	79,041	31.3%									
2020	Bonnie Watson Coleman	230,883	65.6%	Mark Razzoli	114,591	32.6%	R. Edward Forchion	Independent	4,512	1.3%	Ken Cody	Independent	1,739	0.5%	
2022	Bonnie Watson Coleman	125,127	63.1%	Darius Mayfield	71,175	35.9%	Lynn Genrich	Libertarian	1,925	1.0%					
2024	Bonnie Watson Coleman	196,871	61.20%	Darius Mayfield	117,222	36.44%	Kim Meudt	Green	4,652	1.45%	Vic Kaplan	Libertarian	2,915	0.91%	

== See also ==
- List of African-American United States representatives
- Women in the United States House of Representatives

Party political offices
Preceded by Joseph J. Roberts	Chair of the New Jersey Democratic Party; 2002–2006	Succeeded by Joseph Cryan
New Jersey General Assembly
Preceded by Joseph J. Roberts	Majority Leader of the New Jersey General Assembly; 2006–2010	Succeeded by Joseph Cryan
U.S. House of Representatives
Preceded by Rush Holt Jr.	Member of the U.S. House of Representatives from New Jersey's 12th congressional district 2015–present	Incumbent
U.S. order of precedence (ceremonial)
Preceded by Norma Torres	United States representatives by seniority 146th	Succeeded by Bruce Westerman
