= Black Maternal Health Caucus =

- Founded: April 9, 2019; 7 years ago
- Headquarters: Washington, D.C., USA
- Political position: Multi-partisan congressional caucus (Mission: "The Black Maternal Health Caucus aims to raise awareness within Congress to establish Black maternal health as a national priority, and explore and advocate for effective, evidence-based, culturally-competent policies and best practices for health outcomes for Black mothers."
- Seats in the House: 111 / 435
- Seats in the Senate: 0 / 100

Website
- blackmaternalhealthcaucus-underwood.house.gov

The Black Maternal Health Caucus is a caucus made up of mostly African-American members of the United States Congress. Congresswomen Alma Adams of North Carolina and Lauren Underwood of Illinois founded the caucus in April 2019 and currently serve as co-chairs.

== Purpose ==
The Black Maternal Health Caucus was founded to 'improve black maternal health outcomes,' with the founders citing statistics that the United States has the worst maternal death rates in the developed world, at 18 death per 100,000 live births, and with a higher rate among black women, at 40 deaths per 100,000 live births.

== History ==
Shortly after the formation of the Black Maternal Health Caucus, Senator Kamala Harris sponsored the Maternal CARE Act. If passed, the Maternal CARE Act would serve to reduce maternal mortality and morbidity by providing implicit bias training as a solution for addressing racial bias in health care.

As of 2019, seventy-five members of the United States House of Representatives belong to the caucus, including support from Speaker of the United States House of Representatives Nancy Pelosi, House Majority Leader Steny Hoyer and other leaders within the Democratic caucus.

In 2020, the COVID-19 pandemic in the United States highlighted racial disparities in healthcare. Many Black women requiring hospitalization were dying at alarming rates compared to other racial groups.

In 2021, an updated Momnibus was introduced. Sponsoring members of the House of Representatives of include: Sheila Jackson Lee, Nikema Williams, and Jamie Raskin. The term "Momnibus" is a word play on "omnibus," which is a single bill submitted to a legislature that combines several diverse matters.

== Legislation ==
In March 2020, Lauren Underwood introduced the Momnibus Package, "which would require the Centers for Disease Control and Prevention to publicly post data on COVID-19 and pregnancy, disaggregated by race and ethnicity". In May 2023, the legislation, consisting of 13 individual bills, was endorsed by over 200 organizations and Black maternal health advocates, including Planned Parenthood Action Fund, March of Dimes, Christy Turlington Burns, and Christine Michel Carter.

== Membership ==
Black Maternal Health Caucus in the 118th United States Congress

=== Alabama ===
- Terri Sewell (AL-07)

=== Arizona ===
- Greg Stanton (AZ-04)

=== California ===
- Adam Schiff (CA)
- Ami Bera (CA-06)
- Kevin Mullin (CA-15)
- Ro Khanna (CA-17)
- Julia Brownley (CA-26)
- Jimmy Gomez (CA-34)
- Norma Torres (CA-35)
- Ted Lieu (CA-36)
- Sydney Kamlager-Dove (CA-37)
- Mark Takano (CA-39)
- Nanette Barragán (CA-44)
- J. Luis Correa (CA-46)
- Sara Jacobs (CA-51)

=== Colorado ===
- Diana DeGette (CO-01)
- Joe Neguse (CO-02)
- Jason Crow (CO-06)

=== Connecticut ===
- Richard Blumenthal (CT)
- John Larson (CT-01)
- Rosa DeLauro (CT-04)
- Jahana Hayes (CT-05)

=== Delaware ===
- Lisa Blunt Rochester (DE)

=== District of Columbia ===
- Eleanor Holmes Norton (DC-AL)

=== Florida ===
- Darren Soto (FL-09)
- Maxwell Frost (FL-10)
- Lois Frankel (FL-22)
- Jared Moskowitz (FL-23)
- Debbie Wasserman Schultz (FL-25)

=== Georgia ===
- Raphael Warnock (GA)
- Sanford Bishop (GA-02)
- Hank Johnson (GA-04)
- Nikema Williams (GA-05)
- Lucy McBath (GA-07)
- David Scott (GA-13)

=== Hawaii ===
- Jill Tokuda (HI-02)

=== Illinois ===
- Jonathan Jackson (IL-01)
- Delia C. Ramirez (IL-03)
- Sean Casten (IL-06)
- Danny Davis (IL-07)
- Raja Krishnamoorthi (IL-08)
- Jan Schakowsky (IL-09)
- Bill Foster (IL-11)
- Nikki Budzinski (IL-13)
- Lauren Underwood (IL-14) (Co-chair)

=== Indiana ===
- Frank Mrvan (IN-01)
- André Carson (IN-07)

=== Kansas ===
- Sharice Davids (KS-03)

=== Kentucky ===
- Morgan McGarvey (KY-03)

=== Maryland ===
- Chris Van Hollen (MD)
- Glenn Ivey (MD-04)
- Steny Hoyer (MD-05)
- Kweisi Mfume (MD-07)
- Jamie Raskin (MD-08)

=== Massachusetts ===
- Jim McGovern (MA-02)
- Lori Trahan (MA-03)
- Seth Moulton (MA-04)
- Ayanna Pressley (MA-07)

=== Michigan ===
- Elissa Slotkin (MI)
- Hillary Scholten (MI-03)
- Debbie Dingell (MI-06)
- Haley Stevens (MI-11)
- Rashida Tlaib (MI-12)
- Shri Thanedar (MI-13)

=== Minnesota ===
- Angie Craig (MN-02)
- Betty McCollum (MN-04)
- Ilhan Omar (MN-05)

=== Missouri ===
- Wesley Bell (MO-01)

=== Nevada ===
- Dina Titus (NV-01)
- Steven Horsford (NV-04)

=== New Jersey ===
- Cory Booker (NJ)
- Bonnie Watson Coleman (NJ-12)
- Josh Gottheimer (NJ-05)

=== New York ===
- Laura Gillen (NY-04)
- Gregory Meeks (NY-05)
- Grace Meng (NY-06)
- Nydia Velázquez (NY-07)
- Hakeem Jeffries (NY-08)
- Yvette Clarke (NY-09)
- Jerrold Nadler (NY-12)
- Adriano Espaillat (NY-13)
- Ritchie Torres (NY-15)
- Paul Tonko (NY-20)
- Brian Higgins (NY-26)

=== North Carolina ===
- Deborah K. Ross (NC-02)
- Valerie Foushee (NC-04)
- Alma Adams (NC-12) (Co-chair)

=== Ohio ===
- Joyce Beatty (OH-03)
- Shontel Brown (OH-11)
- Emilia Strong Sykes (OH-13)
- Mike Carey (OH-15)

=== Oregon ===
- Suzanne Bonamici (OR-01)
- Andrea Salinas (OR-06)

=== Pennsylvania ===
- Dwight Evans (PA-03)
- Mary Gay Scanlon (PA-05)
- Chrissy Houlahan (PA-06)
- Summer Lee (PA-12)

=== South Carolina ===
- Jim Clyburn (SC-06)

=== Tennessee ===
- Steve Cohen (TN-09)

=== Texas ===
- Lizzie Fletcher (TX-07)
- Sylvia Garcia (TX-29)
- Jasmine Crockett (TX-30)
- Julie Johnson (TX-32)
- Marc Veasey (TX-33)

=== Vermont ===
- Becca Balint (VT-AL)

=== Virginia ===
- Bobby Scott (VA-03)
- Jennifer McClellan (VA-04)
- Don Beyer (VA-08)
- Gerry Connolly (VA-11)

=== Washington ===
- Rick Larsen (WA-02)
- Kim Schrier (WA-08)
- Adam Smith (WA-09)
- Marilyn Strickland (WA-10)

=== Wisconsin ===
- Tammy Baldwin (WI)
- Mark Pocan (WI-02)
- Gwen Moore (WI-04)

== See also ==
- Black maternal mortality in the United States
- African Americans in the United States Congress
