= Jan Schakowsky =

American politician (born 1944)

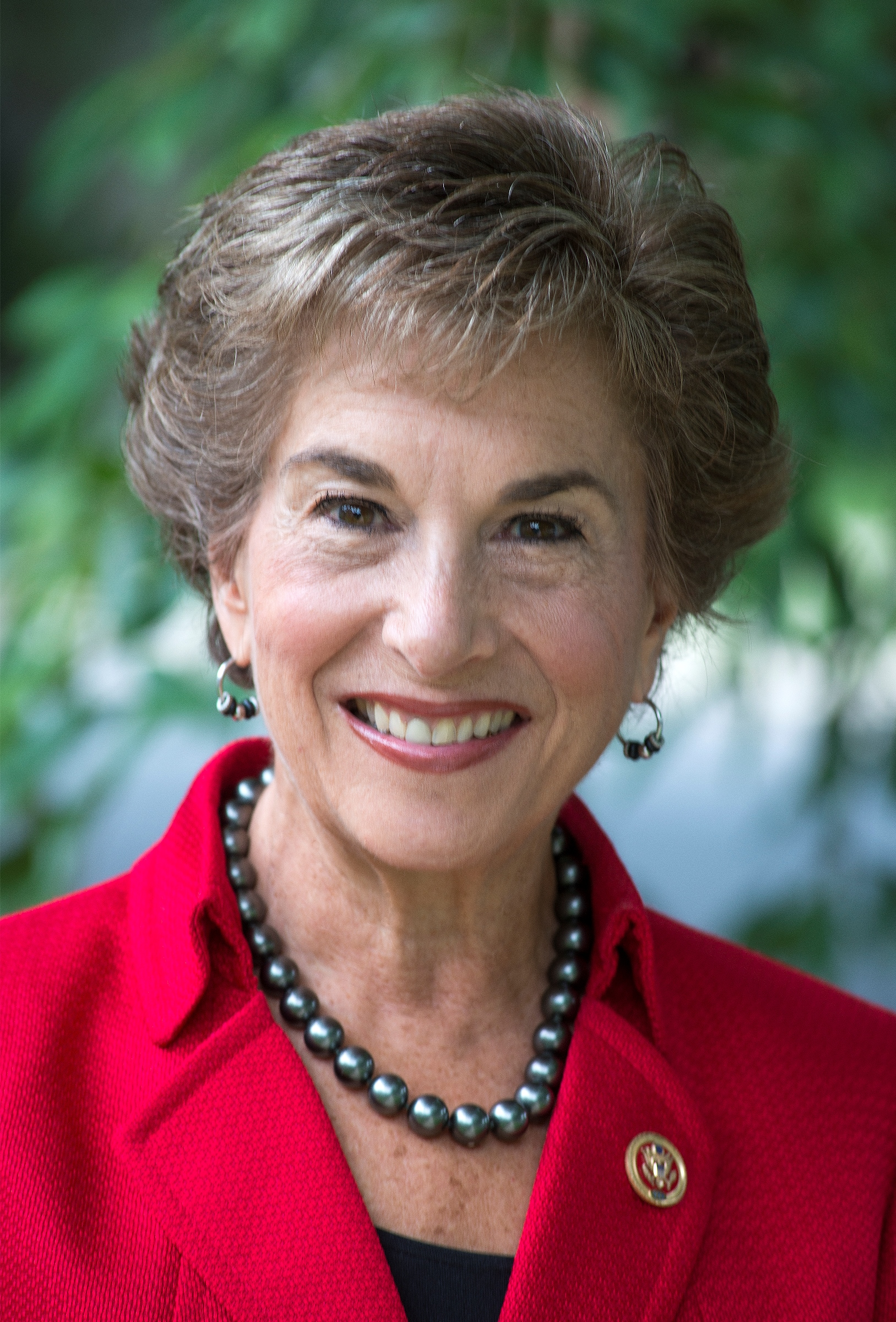
- Official portrait, 2014

House Democratic Senior Chief Deputy Whip
- Incumbent
- Assumed office January 3, 2019
- Leader: Nancy Pelosi; Hakeem Jeffries
- Preceded by: G. K. Butterfield

Member of the U.S. House of Representatives from Illinois's 9th district
- Incumbent
- Assumed office January 3, 1999
- Preceded by: Sidney R. Yates

Member of the Illinois House of Representatives
- In office January 9, 1991 – December 31, 1998
- Preceded by: Woody Bowman
- Succeeded by: Julie Hamos
- Constituency: 18th district (1993–1999); 4th district (1991–1993)

Personal details
- Born: Janice Danoff; May 26, 1944 (age 82) Chicago, Illinois, U.S.
- Party: Democratic
- Spouses: Harvey Schakowsky (m. 1965; div. 1980); Robert Creamer (m. 1980)
- Children: 2 (with Schakowsky)
- Education: University of Illinois, Urbana-Champaign (BS)
- Website: House website Campaign website
- Schakowsky's voice Schakowsky on legislation to protect social workers from workplace violence Recorded November 21, 2019

Janice Schakowsky (/ʃəˈkaʊski/ shə-KOW-skee; née Danoff; born May 26, 1944) is an American politician who has served as the U.S. representative from Illinois's 9th congressional district since 1999, and she previously served as a member of the Illinois House of Representatives (1991–1998). She is a member of the Democratic Party.

Her district is anchored in Chicago's North Side, including much of the area bordering Lake Michigan. It includes many of Chicago's northern suburbs, including Arlington Heights, Des Plaines, Evanston, Glenview, Niles, Park Ridge, Rosemont, Skokie, Wilmette, as of the decennial redistricting following the 2010 United States census.

On May 5, 2025, Schakowsky announced that she would not seek reelection in 2026.

== Early life, education, and career ==
Schakowsky was born Janice Danoff in 1944 in Chicago, the daughter of Tillie (née Cosnow) and Irwin Danoff. Her parents were Jewish immigrants, her father a Lithuanian Jew and her mother from Russia.

Schakowsky graduated with a Bachelor of Science in elementary education from the University of Illinois at Urbana-Champaign, where she was a member of Delta Phi Epsilon sorority.

Schakowsky was Program Director of Illinois Public Action, Illinois's largest public interest group, from 1976 to 1985. She thereafter served as executive director of the Illinois State Council of Senior Citizens from 1985 to 1990. In 1986, Schakowsky ran for the Cook County Board of Commissioners from suburban Cook County. She won the primary to be one of the Democratic nominees, but did not win in the general election. In the 1980s, Schakowsky was a member of the Democratic Socialists of America, but there is no evidence that she maintained her membership.

== Illinois House of Representatives (1991–1998) ==
In 1990, Schakowsky was elected to the Illinois House of Representatives, representing the fourth district. In 1992, she was redistricted to the 18th district. She served in the legislature up until the end of 1998.

== U.S. House of Representatives (1999–present) ==
=== 1998 campaign ===
For years, Schakowsky eyed a run in Illinois's 9th congressional district, intending to run whenever incumbent Democrat Sidney R. Yates opted to retire. Yates had represented the 9th district since 1949 (except for one term due to an unsuccessful run for the Senate in 1962), Schakowsky had explored runs in 1992, 1994, and 1996 under the belief each time that Yates might retire.

After his 1996 re-election, Yates announced that he would not seek further re-election in 1998. Schakowsky faced then-Illinois state senator Howard W. Carroll and future Illinois governor J. B. Pritzker in the primary (who ultimately finished second and third, respectively).

The 9th district represented the northern lakefront of Chicago, as well as the suburbs of Evanston and Skokie. It had a large Jewish electorate, with the district long being regarded as the "Jewish seat" in Illinois' congressional delegation. Yates was Jewish, and all three Democratic contenders to succeed him were as well. Originally also running was a (non-Jewish) fourth candidate: Charles A. "Pat" Boyle, an attorney (whose late father, Charles A. Boyle, had served as a congressman in the 1950s). The district was considered among the most liberal congressional districts in the United States. Journalist James Ylisela Jr. observed that Pritzker, Schakowsky, and Carroll largely all ran on platforms aligned with the Democratic Party agenda that Yates had championed. However, the Chicago Tribune separately noted that Schakowsky ran on a more liberal platform than either Pritzker or Caroll, who ran on somewhat more moderate platforms and potentially wound up competing for many of the same voters. Schakowsky centered her message on championing equal rights for women, minorities, and gays. She also focused on protections for trade union workers and on national healthcare reform to address issues of affordability. She also noted the under-representation of women in Congress.

At the time, the election was one of the most expensive congressional primaries in U.S. history, and Pritzker spent nearly $1 million of his own money to fund his run (including $500,000 on television ads in the Chicago market).

Schakowsky won the Democratic primary by a strong margin, all but assuring her election in the heavily Democratic 9th district. She won 45.14% to Carroll's 34.40% and Pritzker's 20.48%. She won the November general election with 75% of the vote, and has since been reelected thirteen times.

=== Planned retirement ===
On May 5, 2025, Schakowsky announced her decision not to seek re-election at the end of her current term in 2026.

=== Women's issues ===
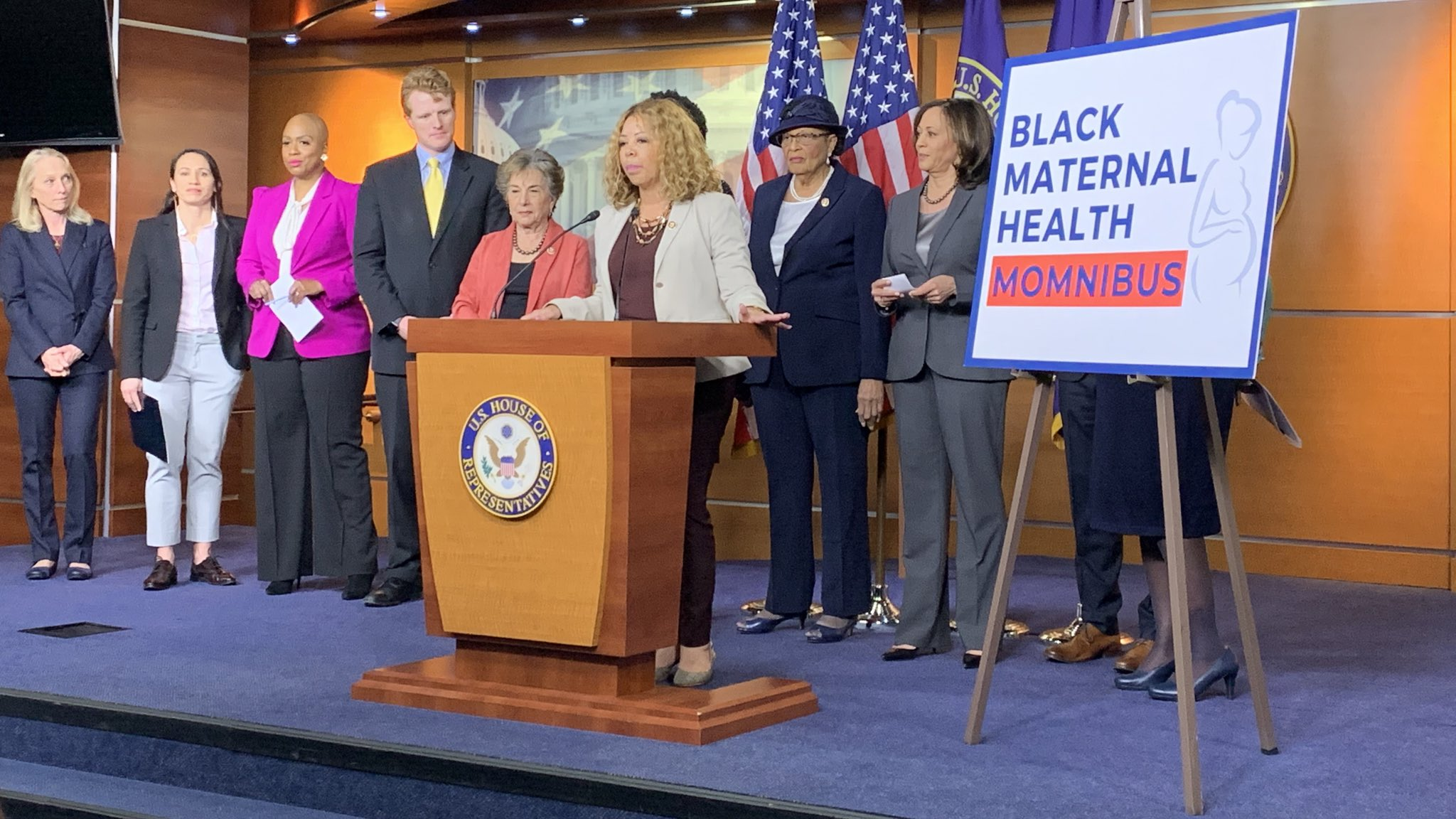
Schakowsky with Kamala Harris

As co-chair of the Congressional Caucus for Women's Issues, Schakowsky has been known for her support of women's issues.

=== Opposition to the Iraq War ===
Schakowsky was outspoken in her opposition to the Iraq War. She was one of the earliest and most emphatic supporters of U.S. senator Barack Obama before he won the 2004 Illinois Democratic primary election, and actively supported his bid for the 2008 Democratic presidential nomination. On February 7, 2007, she introduced the Iraq and Afghanistan Contractor Sunshine Act (H.R. 897) in the House of Representatives, seeking information from leading federal agencies on their contracts for work in Iraq and Afghanistan. The bill was not enacted.

=== Banning export of horses for slaughter ===
In March 2013, Schakowsky and Representative Pat Meehan introduced the Safeguard American Food Exports (SAFE) Act, which would have prohibited the sale or transport of equines in interstate or foreign commerce to be slaughtered for human consumption. Schakowsky reintroduced the legislation in subsequent Congresses throughout the remainder of her tenure.

=== Climate change ===
In hearings held by the House Energy and Commerce Subcommittee in July 2006, Schakowsky expressed concern that a report from the National Academy of Sciences showing discrepancies among scientists studying global warming might be "used in a way to discredit the whole notion that our country and the rest of the industrialized and developing world ought to do anything about global warming".

=== Angling for elevation ===
In November 2008, Schakowsky indicated interest in replacing Barack Obama in the U.S. Senate after he was elected president. llinois governor Rod Blagojevich (prior to his arrest that December) had reportedly been considering her among at least six other candidates to fill the vacancy. Schakowsky was one of the first figures in Illinois to voice interest in running in a special election to replace Obama.

=== Support for public option ===
In April 2009, she stated her support for a public option in health insurance, arguing that it would put health insurance companies out of business and lead to single-payer health care, which she supports.

=== Critique and apology for comments about Joel Pollak ===
In March 2015, the Orthodox Union criticized Schakowsky after she said that Jewish politician Joel Pollak was a "Jewish, Orthodox, Tea Party Republican" at a J Street event. She later apologized for her comments.

=== Support for LGBT rights ===
In 2015, Schakowsky was inducted into the Chicago Gay and Lesbian Hall of Fame as a Friend of the Community. In February 2021, she voted for the Equality Act on behalf of her transgender grandson Isaac.

=== Boycott of Netanyahu's 2015 speech to Congress ===
In March 2015, Schakowsky did not attend Prime Minister of Israel Benjamin Netanyahu's speech to Congress because, she wrote in the Huffington Post, it could scuttle delicate negotiations with Iran: "The prime minister wants the negotiations to end, and his purpose in speaking to the Congress is to convince us that the president is about to agree to a deal that threatens Israel's existence. He believes the president is naïve in thinking that he and the P5+1 can achieve any agreement that will stop Iran from rushing toward a bomb ... What is the alternative to an agreement? Yes, the United States will increase sanctions. But does anyone doubt that Iran will build a nuclear weapon regardless of sanctions? Then the choices will be ugly: accepting a nuclear-weaponized Iran or accepting military action (i.e., war with Iran). For me it's obvious that we must give the negotiations a chance. And, in the meantime, Iran has essentially halted its weapons program under the Joint Plan of Action while the talks are ongoing."

=== Product safety issues ===
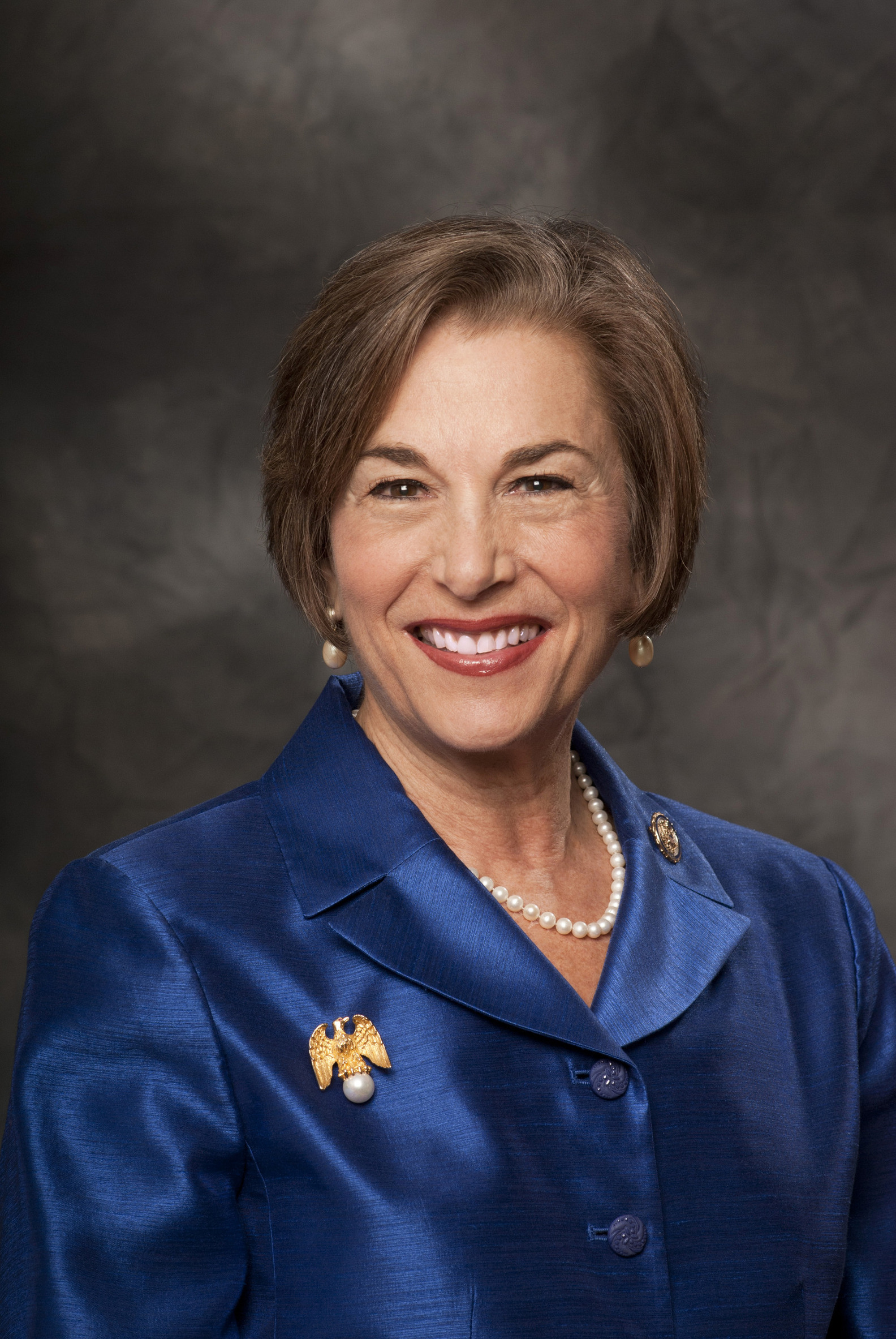
Schakowsky during the 113th Congress

Schakowsky has long taken substantial interest in product safety issues and persistently engaged in robust oversight of the U.S. Consumer Product Safety Commission. She has often been critical of Republicans on the commission.

=== Support of Assyrian issues ===
Schakowsky has been a proponent of numerous initiatives pertaining to ethnic Assyrians. According to Assyrian American activist Atour Sargon, Schakowsky was an early supporter of her ideas and encouraged her to pursue a political career as early as 2017. She claimed that Schakowsky assisted her during her successful 2019 Trustee campaign in Lincolnwood, Illinois.

During the 2017 confirmation hearings of then-Secretary of State appointee Rex Tillerson, Schakowsky criticized his support of policies that she alleged were detrimental to the future of Assyrian existence in Iraq.

Schakowsky spoke at the 2018 and 2020 Democratic Candidates' Forums organized by Vote Assyrian. At the 2020 forum, she called Assyrians "one of the fastest-growing communities in terms of political involvement".

On August 7, 2020, Schakowsky released a statement recognizing the anniversary of the 1933 Simele massacre. She is also a proponent of House Resolution 537, which would have the federal government officially recognize the Assyrian genocide if passed.

Throughout her congressional tenure, Schakowsky has supported and co-sponsored bills that would extend U.S. support for Assyrian self-governance in Iraq, particularly in the Nineveh Plains region.

=== Nagorno-Karabakh conflict ===
On October 1, 2020, Schakowsky co-signed a letter to Secretary of State Mike Pompeo that condemned Azerbaijan’s offensive operations against the Armenian-populated enclave of Nagorno-Karabakh, denounced Turkey’s role in the Nagorno-Karabakh conflict, and called for an immediate ceasefire.

=== Syrian conflict ===
In 2023, Schakowsky was among 56 Democrats to vote in favor of H.Con.Res. 21 which directed President Joe Biden to remove U.S. troops from Syria within 180 days.

=== Gaza war ===
After the drone strikes on aid workers from World Central Kitchen in April 2024, Mark Pocan, James P. McGovern, Jan Schakowsky, Nancy Pelosi and 36 more members of Congress from the Democratic party urged U.S. president Joe Biden in an open letter to reconsider planned arms shipments to the Israeli military.

=== Fiscal Responsibility Act of 2023 ===
Schakowsky was among the 46 Democrats who voted against final passage of the Fiscal Responsibility Act of 2023 in the House.

=== Voting age ===
In January 2023, Schakowsky was one of 13 cosponsors of an amendment to the Constitution of the United States extending the right to vote to citizens 16 years of age or older.

=== 2004 presidential election ===
The Nation endorsed Schakowsky as the best possible choice for vice president in the 2004 United States presidential election, writing that she was "the truest heir to Paul Wellstone in the current Congress". She was not selected as John Kerry's running mate.

After the election, Schakowsky was one of 31 House Democrats who voted to not count Ohio's twenty electoral votes. President George W. Bush won Ohio by 118,457 votes. The purpose of the objection was not to prevent Bush's certification as president-elect, but rather was to register protest and raise public awareness of alleged irregularities in Ohio. Schakowsky hailed the protest as an opportunity to raise attention to the need for congress to pass electoral reforms.

=== Criticism of the Tea Party movement ===
In April 2009, Schakowsky pointedly criticized the tax day Tea Party protests: "It's despicable that right-wing Republicans would attempt to cheapen a significant, honorable moment of American history with a shameful political stunt."

=== Committee assignments ===
For the 119th Congress:

- Committee on Energy and Commerce
  - Subcommittee on Commerce, Manufacturing, and Trade (Ranking Member)
  - Subcommittee on Environment

=== Party leadership and caucus memberships ===
- Chief Deputy Whip
- Steering and Policy Committee
- Founding member of the Out-of-Iraq Caucus
- Democratic Vice Chair of the bipartisan Women's Caucus
- Vice Chair of the Congressional Progressive Caucus
- Congressional Arts Caucus
- Afterschool Caucuses
- Congressional Asian Pacific American Caucus
- Climate Solutions Caucus
- Medicare for All Caucus
- Blue Collar Caucus
- Congressional Freethought Caucus
- Congressional Caucus for the Equal Rights Amendment
- Congressional Wildlife Refuge Caucus
- Rare Disease Caucus
- Black Maternal Health Caucus
- Congressional Equality Caucus
- Congressional Ukraine Caucus

==== Progressive caucus membership ====
Schakowsky is regarded to be a progressive member of the U.S. House. In 2009, she was identified by GovTrack as being among the most progressive members of the 111th United States Congress. As such, she has been a member of the Congressional Progressive Caucus.

In December 2016, she was elected the Congressional Progressive Caucus' vice chair and liaison to the Democratic Party Seniors taskforce. In December 2020, she was named as an executive board member at-large of the Congressional Progressive Caucus.

=== Criticism of the term "manufacturing" ===
In a 2025 Committee on Energy and Commerce hearing on manufacturing, Schakowsky expressed a concern that the presence of the word "man" in the term manufacturing might harm engagement of women in the manufacturing sector, saying that the term "sounds like a guy". Her comments went viral on social media and were widely ridiculed.

== Electoral history ==
=== Cook County Board of Commissioners (suburban Cook County) ===
1986

1986 Cook County Board of Commissioners suburban Cook County Democratic primary
Party	Candidate	Votes	%
Democratic	Joan P. Murphy	75,981	13.85
Democratic	Janice D. "Jan" Schakowsky	72,315	13.18
Democratic	Kevin J. Conlon	71,012	12.94
Democratic	John D. Rita	70,835	12.91
Democratic	Andrew "Andy" Przybylo	67,167	12.24
Democratic	Renee H. Thaler	67,072	12.22
Democratic	John J. Lattner	62,287	11.35
Democratic	Edward J. King	62,015	11.30

1986 Cook County Board of Commissioners suburban Cook County election
Party	Candidate	Votes	%
Republican	Mary M. McDonald (incumbent)	339,214	9.08
Republican	Joseph D. Mathewson	336,097	9.00
Republican	Harold L. Tyrrell (incumbent)	317,481	8.50
Republican	Carl R. Hansen (incumbent)	314,145	8.41
Republican	Richard A. Siebel (incumbent)	310,800	8.32
Republican	Joseph I. Woods (incumbent)	303,068	8.11
Republican	Robert P. Gooley	269,438	7.21
Democratic	Joan P. Murphy	262,699	7.03
Democratic	Janice D. "Jan" Schakowsky	239,517	6.41
Democratic	John J. Lattner	229,352	6.14
Democratic	Kevin J. Conlon	216,394	5.79
Democratic	Andrew "Andy" Przybylo	209,503	5.61
Democratic	John D. Rita	198,403	5.31
Democratic	Renee H. Thaler	189,344	5.07

=== Illinois House ===
1990

1990 Illinois House of Representatives 4th district Democratic primary
Party	Candidate	Votes	%
Democratic	Janice D. "Jan" Schakowsky	7,454	54.62
Democratic	Jonathan K. Baum	6,192	43.37

1990 Illinois House of Representatives 4th district election
Party	Candidate	Votes	%
Democratic	Janice D. "Jan" Schakowsky	17,072	63.58
Republican	Joan W. Barr	9,777	36.41

1992

1992 Illinois House of Representatives 18th district Democratic primary
Party	Candidate	Votes	%
Democratic	Janice D. "Jan" Schakowsky (redistricted incumbent)	14,002	100

1992 Illinois House of Representatives 18th district election
Party	Candidate	Votes	%
Democratic	Janice D. "Jan" Schakowsky (redistricted incumbent)	30,413	78.51
Republican	Bruce W. Haffner	7,542	19.47
Libertarian	Theodore C. Beckman	779	2.01

1994

1994 Illinois House of Representatives 18th district Democratic primary
Party	Candidate	Votes	%
Democratic	Janice D. Schakowsky (incumbent)	9,587	100

1994 Illinois House of Representatives 18th district election
Party	Candidate	Votes	%
Democratic	Janice D. Schakowsky (incumbent)	17,159	78.27
Republican	Vernon J. Grubisich	4,762	19.47

1996

1996 Illinois House of Representatives 18th district Democratic primary
Party	Candidate	Votes	%
Democratic	Janice D. "Jan" Schakowsky (incumbent)	7,533	100

1996 Illinois House of Representatives 18th district election
Party	Candidate	Votes	%
Democratic	Janice D. Schakowsky (incumbent)	26,910	83.40
Republican	Edward M. Potash	5,353	16.59

=== U.S. House ===
1998

1998 Illinois 9th congressional district Democratic primary
Party	Candidate	Votes	%
Democratic	Janice D. "Jan" Schakowsky	31,443	45.14
Democratic	Howard W. Carroll	23,963	34.40
Democratic	Jay "J.B." Pritzker	14,256	20.46
Total votes		69,662	100

1998 Illinois 9th congressional district election
Party	Candidate	Votes	%
Democratic	Janice D. "Jan" Schakowsky	107,878	74.60
Republican	Herbert Sohn	33,448	23.13
Libertarian	Michael D. Ray	3,284	2.27
Total votes		144,610	100.0

2000

2000 Illinois 9th congressional district Democratic primary
Party	Candidate	Votes	%
Democratic	Jan Schakowsky (incumbent)	49,429	100
Total votes		49,429	100

2000 Illinois 9th congressional district election
Party	Candidate	Votes	%
Democratic	Jan Schakowsky (incumbent)	147,002	76.43
Republican	Dennis J. Driscoll	45,344	23.57
Total votes		192,346	100.0

2002

2002 Illinois 9th congressional district Democratic primary
Party	Candidate	Votes	%
Democratic	Janice D. Schakowsky (incumbent)	69,020	100
Total votes		69,020	100

2002 Illinois 9th congressional district election
Party	Candidate	Votes	%
Democratic	Janice D. Schakowsky (incumbent)	118,642	70.27
Republican	Nicholas M. Duric	45,307	26.83
Libertarian	Stephanie "Vs. The Machine" Sailor	4,887	2.89
Total votes		168,836	100.0

2004

2004 Illinois 9th congressional district Democratic primary
Party	Candidate	Votes	%
Democratic	Janice D. Schakowsky (incumbent)	70,736	100
Total votes		70,736	100

2004 Illinois 9th congressional district election
Party	Candidate	Votes	%
Democratic	Janice D. Schakowsky (incumbent)	175,282	75.74
Republican	Kurt J. Eckhardt	56,135	24.26
Total votes		231,417	100.0

2006

2006 Illinois 9th congressional district Democratic primary
Party	Candidate	Votes	%
Democratic	Janice D. Schakowsky (incumbent)	57,490	100
Total votes		57,490	100

2006 Illinois 9th congressional district election
Party	Candidate	Votes	%
Democratic	Janice D. Schakowsky (incumbent)	122,852	74.59
Republican	Michael P. Shannon	41,858	25.41
Write-in votes	Simon Michael Ribeiro	3	0.00
Total votes		164,713	100.0

2008

2008 Illinois 9th congressional district Democratic primary
Party	Candidate	Votes	%
Democratic	Janice D. Schakowsky (incumbent)	98,374	87.66
Democratic	John Nocita	13,485	12.02
Total votes		112,219	100.0

2008 Illinois 9th congressional district election
Party	Candidate	Votes	%
Democratic	Janice D. Schakowsky (incumbent)	181,948	74.66
Republican	Michael Benjamin Younan	53,593	21.99
Green	Morris Shanfield	8,140	3.34
Write-in votes	Susanne Atanus	13	0.01
Total votes		243,694	100.0

2010

2010 Illinois 9th congressional district Democratic primary
Party	Candidate	Votes	%
Democratic	Janice D. Schakowsky (incumbent)	62,763	100
Total votes		62,763	100

2010 Illinois 9th congressional district election
Party	Candidate	Votes	%
Democratic	Janice D. Schakowsky (incumbent)	117,553	66.34
Republican	Joel Barry Pollak	55,182	31.14
Green	Simon Ribeiro	4,472	2.52
Total votes		177,207	100.0

2012

2012 Illinois 9th congressional district Democratic primary
Party	Candidate	Votes	%
Democratic	Janice D. Schakowsky (incumbent)	48,124	91.85
Democratic	Simon Ribeiro	4,270	8.15
Total votes		52,394	100.0

2012 Illinois 9th congressional district election
Party	Candidate	Votes	%
Democratic	Janice D. Schakowsky (incumbent)	194,869	66.33
Republican	Timothy C Wolfe	98,924	33.67
Write-in votes	Hilaire Fuji Shioura	8	0.00
Write-in votes	Susanne Atanus	6	0.00
Total votes		293,807	100.0

2014

2014 Illinois 9th congressional district Democratic primary
Party	Candidate	Votes	%
Democratic	Janice D. Schakowsky (incumbent)	31,576	100
Total votes		31,576	100

2014 Illinois 9th congressional district election
Party	Candidate	Votes	%
Democratic	Janice D. Schakowsky (incumbent)	141,000	66.06
Republican	Susanne Atanus	72,834	33.91
Write-in votes	Phil Collins	66	0.03
Total votes		213,450	100.0

2016

2016 Illinois 9th congressional district Democratic primary
Party	Candidate	Votes	%
Democratic	Janice D. Schakowsky (incumbent)	134,961	100
Total votes		134,961	100

2016 Illinois 9th congressional district election
Party	Candidate	Votes	%
Democratic	Janice D. Schakowsky (incumbent)	217,306	66.47
Republican	Joan McCarthy Lasonde	109,550	33.51
Write-in votes	David Williams	79	0.02
Write-in votes	Susanne Atanus	13	0.00
Total votes		326,948	100.0

2018

2018 Illinois 9th congressional district Democratic primary
Party	Candidate	Votes	%
Democratic	Janice D. Schakowsky (incumbent)	108,417	100
Total votes		108,417	100

2018 Illinois 9th congressional District election
Party	Candidate	Votes	%
Democratic	Janice D. Schakowsky (incumbent)	213,368	73.49
Republican	John D. Elleson	76,983	26.51
Total votes		290,351	100.0

2020

2020 Illinois 9th congressional district Democratic primary
Party	Candidate	Votes	%
Democratic	Janice D. Schakowsky (incumbent)	127,467	99.72
Democratic	Andrew Heldut (write-in)	355	0.03
Total votes		127,822	100

2020 Illinois 9th congressional district election
Party	Candidate	Votes	%
Democratic	Janice D. Schakowsky (incumbent)	262,045	70.98
Republican	Sargis Sangari	107,125	29.02
Total votes		369,170	100.0

2022

2022 Illinois 9th congressional district election
Party	Candidate	Votes	%
Democratic	Janice D. Schakowsky (incumbent)	179,615	71.69
Republican	Max Rice	70,915	28.31
Total votes		250,530	100.0

2024

2024 Illinois 9th congressional district election
Party	Candidate	Votes	%
Democratic	Janice D. Schakowsky (incumbent)	231,722	68.39
Republican	Seth Alan Cohen	107,106	31.61
Total votes		338,828	100.0

== Personal life ==
Schakowsky lives in Evanston, Illinois, with her husband Robert Creamer. She has two children and a stepchild.

In 2005, Creamer pleaded guilty to failure to collect withholding tax and to bank fraud for writing checks with insufficient funds. All the money was repaid. Schakowsky was not accused of wrongdoing. While she served on the organization's board during the time the crimes occurred, and signed the IRS filings along with Creamer, the U.S. district judge noted that no one suffered "out of pocket losses", and Creamer acted not out of greed but in an effort to keep his community action group going without cutting programs, though he paid his own $100,000 salary with fraudulently obtained funds. Creamer served five months in prison. Assistant U.S. Attorney Joseph Ferguson said the government did not believe Creamer "acknowledged the seriousness of his conduct". "At the end of the day", Ferguson said, "Robert Creamer is guilty of multiple crimes and is going to jail for it".

On July 20, 2022, Schakowsky was arrested in front of the Supreme Court building after she and 33 others, including 15 members of Congress, allegedly refused to comply with orders to stop blocking traffic. She uploaded a clip of it to Twitter, adding: "Today, I am making good trouble."

== See also ==
- List of Jewish members of the United States Congress
- Women in the United States House of Representatives

U.S. House of Representatives
Preceded by Sidney Yates	Member of the U.S. House of Representatives from Illinois's 9th congressional district 1999–present	Incumbent
Preceded by Lois Capps	Chair of the Congressional Women's Caucus; 2009–2011	Succeeded by Cynthia Lummis
Party political offices
Preceded by Lois Capps	Chair of the Democratic Women's Working Group; 2009–2011; Served alongside: Gwen Moore (2010–2011)	Succeeded by Gwen Moore; Debbie Wasserman Schultz
Preceded by John Lewis	House Democratic Senior Chief Deputy Whip; 2019–present Served alongside: Cedric Richmond (Assistant to the Majority Whip, 2019–2021); John Lewis, G. K. Butterfield	Incumbent
U.S. order of precedence (ceremonial)
Preceded by John B. Larson	United States representatives by seniority 28th	Succeeded by Mike Simpson
Preceded by John B. Larson	Order of precedence of the United States	Succeeded by Pete Sessions
