= Republican Women's Caucus =

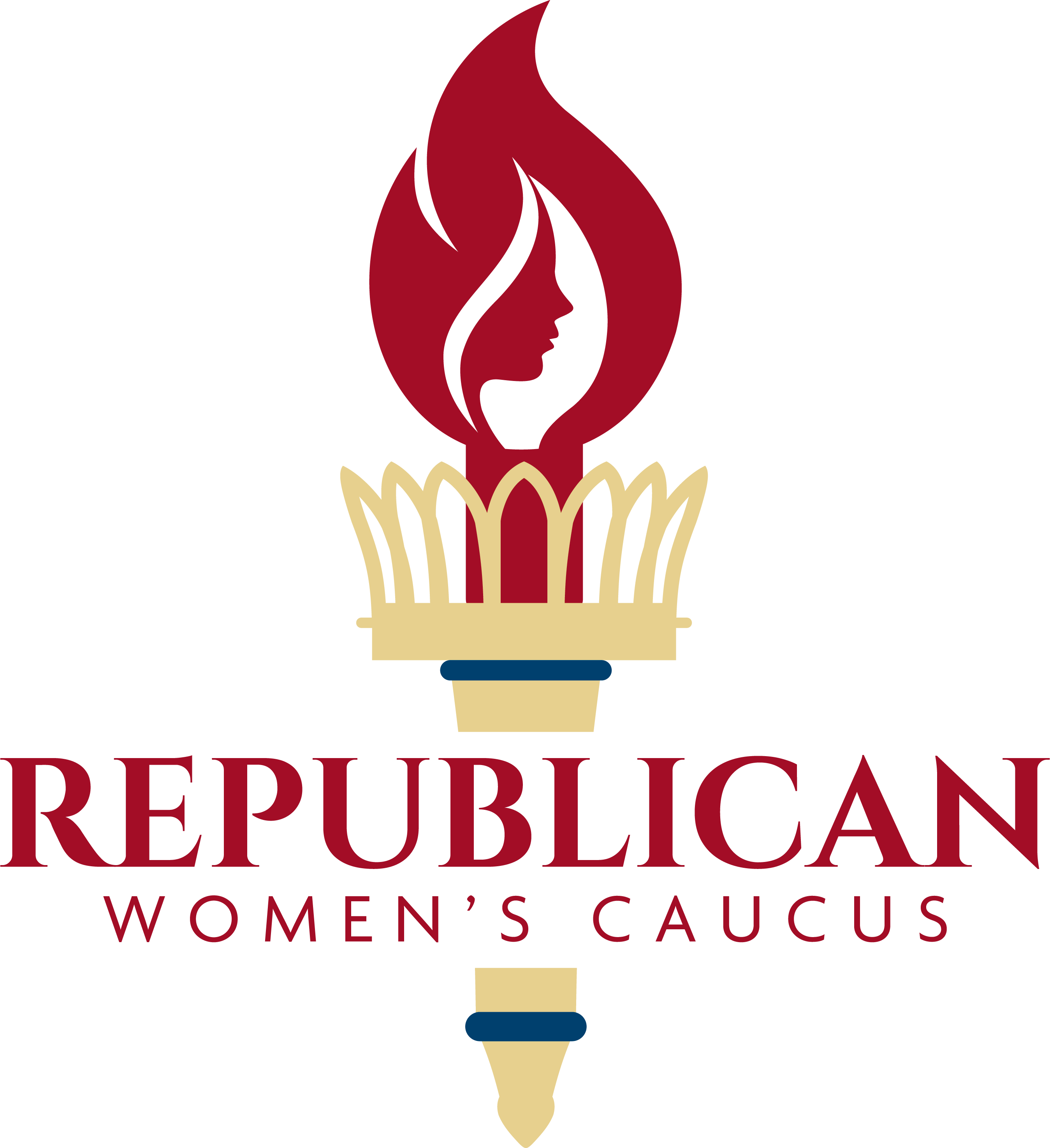
- Chair: Kat Cammack (FL–3); Katie Britt (AL)
- Founded: March 26, 2025; 19 months ago
- National affiliation: Republican Party
- Seats in the House: 28 / 435 (plus 2 non-voting)
- Seats in the House Republican Caucus: 28 / 219 (plus 2 non-voting)
- Seats in the Senate: 10 / 100
- Seats in the Senate Republican Conference: 10 / 53

Website
- Republican Women's Caucus

The Republican Women's Caucus (RWC) is a congressional caucus composed of female Republican members of the United States Congress. It was established in 2025 during the 119th United States Congress and is co-chaired by Representative Kat Cammack and Senator Katie Britt.

The caucus consists of Republican women serving in both the House of Representatives and the Senate.

== History ==
The Republican Women's Caucus was announced on March 26, 2025, by Representative Kat Cammack of Florida and Senator Katie Britt of Alabama. The caucus was launched at the White House during Women's History Month.

The caucus was created as a bicameral organization bringing together Republican women in Congress to coordinate legislative priorities and expand their role within party leadership.

Mary Bono had previously founded the Republican Women's Policy Committee (RWPC) on May 22, 2012. After Bono lost reelection that fall, Renee Ellmers took over as chair. Ellmers lost her 2016 primary, and the RWPC was not reformed at the end of her term.

== Republican Women's Caucus Fund ==
The Republican Women's Caucus Fund is a political action committee that describes itself as the official PAC supporting Republican women lawmakers. On October 29, 2026, The Texas Tribune reported that a deposition from the messaging company Infobip identified the fund as a sender of text messages to Texans that linked to the website of the Transgender Education Network of Texas; a fund spokesperson denied any involvement.

== Leadership ==
Start	End	Chair(s)	State	Chamber
March 26, 2025	present	Katie Britt	AL	Senate
March 26, 2025	present	Kat Cammack	FL	House

== Current members ==
As of April 2026 the caucus has 28 representatives, 10 senators, and 2 non-voting delegates.

=== United States Senate ===
Alabama

- Katie Britt (R-AL)

Alaska

- Lisa Murkowski (R-AK)

Florida

- Ashley Moody (R-FL)

Iowa

- Joni Ernst (R-IA)

Maine

- Susan Collins (R-ME)

Mississippi

- Cindy Hyde-Smith (R-MS)

Nebraska

- Deb Fischer (R-NE)

Tennessee

- Marsha Blackburn (R-TN)

West Virginia

- Shelley Moore Capito (R-WV)

Wyoming

- Cynthia Lummis (R-WY)

=== United States House of Representatives ===
California

- Young Kim (CA-40) (R)

Colorado

- Lauren Boebert (CO-4) (R)

Florida

- Kat Cammack (FL-3) (R)
- Anna Paulina Luna (FL-13) (R)
- Laurel Lee (FL-15) (R)
- Maria Elvira Salazar (FL-27) (R)

Illinois

- Mary Miller (IL-15) (R)

Indiana

- Victoria Spartz (IN-5) (R)
- Erin Houchin (IN-9) (R)

Iowa

- Mariannette Miller-Meeks (IA-1) (R)
- Ashley Hinson (IA-2) (R)

Louisiana

- Julia Letlow (LA-5) (R)

Michigan

- Lisa McClain (MI-9) (R)

Minnesota

- Michelle Fischbach (MN-7) (R)

Missouri

- Ann Wagner (MO-2) (R)

New York

- Nicole Malliotakis (NY-11) (R)
- Claudia Tenney (NY-24) (R)

North Carolina

- Virginia Foxx (NC-5) (R)

North Dakota

- Julie Fedorchak (ND) (R)

Oklahoma

- Stephanie Bice (OK-5) (R)

South Carolina

- Sheri Biggs (SC-3 (R)

Tennessee

- Diana Harshbarger (TN-1) (R)

Texas

- Monica De La Cruz (TX-15) (R)
- Beth Van Duyne (TX-24) (R)

Utah

- Celeste Maloy (UT-2) (R)

Virginia

- Jennifer Kiggans (VA-2) (R)

West Virginia

- Carol Miller (WV-1) (R)

Wyoming

- Harriet Hageman (WY) (R)

American Samoa

- Amata Radewagen (AS) (R)

Northern Mariana Islands

- Kimberlyn King-Hinds (MP) (R)

== See also ==
- Congressional Caucus for Women's Issues
- Democratic Women's Caucus
