= Executive session =

Closed part of an otherwise open meeting

An executive session is any block within an otherwise open meeting (often of a board of directors or other deliberative assembly) in which minutes are taken separately or not at all, outsiders are not present, and the contents of the discussion are treated as confidential (see in camera). In a deliberative assembly, an executive session has come to mean that the proceedings are secret and members could be punished for violating the secrecy.

Depending on the organization or governmental body involved, business that is conducted in executive session could include legal issues, discussion on contracts (such as to purchase land, or offer tax incentives to a corporation moving to an area), and personnel issues (such as hiring and firing).

== Use in the United States Senate ==
An executive session is a portion of the United States Senate's daily session in which it considers nominations and treaties, or other items introduced by the President of the United States. These items are termed executive business; therefore, the session is an executive session. It can either be closed door or open door. Historically, as a courtesy to the President, such sessions were always held behind closed doors, but this custom has been abandoned in modern times. The term "executive session" is still employed to refer to closed-door committee meetings, whether or not they are considering executive business.

An executive session may also be used in other legislatures.

== See also ==
- Closed session of the United States Congress
- Closed sessions of the United States House of Representatives
- Closed sessions of the United States Senate
- Meeting (parliamentary procedure)
