= Closed sessions of the United States House of Representatives =

The United States House of Representatives rarely meets in closed session.

== Rules of the House ==
In the House, Rule XVII, clause 9, governs secret sessions, including the types of business to be considered behind closed doors. A motion to resolve into a secret session may only be made in the House, not in the Committee of the Whole. A Member who offers such a motion announces the possession of confidential information, and moves that the House go into a secret session. The motion is not debatable, but if agreed to, the Member making the motion is recognized under the one-hour rule in closed session.

Members and staff of both houses are prohibited from divulging information from secret sessions, and all staff are sworn to secrecy. Violations of secrecy are punishable by the disciplinary rules of a chamber. A Member may be subject to a variety of punishments, including loss of seniority, fine, reprimand, censure, or expulsion. An officer or employee may be fired or subject to other internal disciplinary actions.

The proceedings of a secret session are not published unless the relevant chamber votes, during the meeting or at a later time, to release them. Then, those portions released are printed in the Congressional Record.

If the House decides not to release a transcript, it is ultimately transferred to the Clerk of the House of Representatives for transmittal to the archivist of the United States for preservation at the National Archives and Records Administration. The transcripts may be made available to the public after 30 years (Rule VII, clause 3).

== List of closed sessions of the House since 1825 ==
The House met frequently in secret session until the end of the War of 1812. The House has met in closed session only 6 times since 1825. The following is a full list of those sessions, along with their dates and the reasons they were called:

Reason	Date(s)
Electronic Surveillance of Terror Suspects	March 13, 2008 (10:11pm–11:09pm)
U.S. support for paramilitary operations in Nicaragua	July 19, 1983
Involvement of Cuba and communist countries in Nicaragua	February 25, 1980
Implementing the Panama Canal Act of 1979	June 20, 1979
Trade between the U.S. and Great Britain	May 27, 1830
Relations with Indian tribes	December 27, 1825

== See also ==
- Closed sessions of the United States Senate
