= Closed sessions of the United States Senate =

Secret meetings of the United States Senate

The United States Senate has the authority for meeting in closed session, as described in the Standing Rules of the Senate.

The Continental Congress and Constitutional Convention met in secret. The Senate met in secret until 1794. The Senate’s executive sessions (such as nominations and treaties) were not opened until 1929.

Standing Senate Rules XXI, XXIX, and XXXI cover secret sessions for legislative and executive business (nominations and treaties). Rule XXIX calls for Senate consideration of treaties to be conducted in secret unless a majority votes to lift the “injunction of secrecy,” which it usually does. Rule XXXI mandates that all nominations be considered in open session unless the Senate votes to do so in secret. Rule XXI calls for the Senate to close its doors once a motion is made and seconded. The motion is not debatable, and its disposition is made behind closed doors. All of a chamber’s normal rules of debate apply during secret sessions, except during impeachment deliberations in the Senate.

For Senate impeachment proceedings, Rules XX and XXIV of the Senate Rules for Impeachment Trials govern secret deliberations. The Senate has interpreted these rules to require closed deliberations during impeachment trials.

The proceedings of a secret session are not published unless the Senate votes, during the meeting or at a later time, to release them. Then, those portions released are printed in the Congressional Record. If the Senate does not approve release of a secret session transcript, the transcript is stored in the Office of Senate Security and ultimately sent to the National Archives and Records Administration. The proceedings remain sealed until the Senate votes to remove the injunction of secrecy.

These sessions have been held 57 times since 1929. The following is a full list of those sessions, along with their dates and the reasons they were called:

| Reason | Date(s) |
|---|---|
| Discussion of the Amy Coney Barrett Supreme Court nomination | October 23, 2020 |
| Ratification of the New START Treaty | December 20, 2010 |
| Impeachment trial of G. Thomas Porteous Jr. (final deliberation on verdict) | December 7, 2010 (5:45 pm – 7:56 pm) |
| The Plame affair and the Bush administration's role in pre-Iraq War intelligence (during debate on Deficit Reduction Omnibus Reconciliation Act of 1995) | November 1, 2005 (2:25 pm – 4:43 pm) |
| Impeachment trial of President Bill Clinton (final deliberation on verdict) | February 9, 10, 11, 12, 1999 |
| Impeachment trial of President Bill Clinton (debate on motion to subpoena witnesses) | January 26, 1999 (4:29 pm – 8:01 pm) |
| Impeachment trial of President Bill Clinton (debate on motion to dismiss articles of impeachment) | January 25, 1999 (5:50 pm – 9:51 pm) |
| Chemical Weapons Convention | April 24, 1997 |
| Most favored nation status for People's Republic of China | February 25, 1992 |
| Impeachment trial of Judge Walter Nixon | November 2, 1989 |
| Impeachment trial of Judge Alcee Hastings | March 16 & October 19, 1989 |
| Intermediate-Range Nuclear Forces Treaty | March 29, 1988 |
| Impeachment trial of Judge Harry E. Claiborne | October 7 (two sessions), 8 & 9, 1986 |
| Defense Authorization Bill, ASAT | June 12, 1984 |
| Soviet Union arms control compliance | February 1, 1984 |
| U.S. support of the Contras in Nicaragua | April 26, 1983 |
| Nominations of Richard Burt and Richard McCormack | February 16, 1983 |
| United States/Soviet Union defense capabilities | May 4, 1982 |
| Armed Forces personnel management | February 1, 1980 |
| Selective Service System | September 21, 1979 |
| Aircraft sales to Egypt, Israel, and Saudi Arabia | May 15, 1978 |
| Torrijos-Carter Treaties on the Panama Canal | February 21 & 22, 1978 |
| Neutron bomb funding | July 1, 1977 |
| Defense Appropriations - Angola | December 17 & 18, 1975 |
| Intelligence Activities, alleged assassination plots involving foreign leaders | November 20, 1975 |
| Defense Appropriations | June 4, 1975 |
| Maneuverable reentry vehicle | June 10, 1974 |
| Trident submarine | September 25, 1973 |
| National Security Study | May 2 (two sessions) & 4, 1972 |
| U.S. involvement in Laos | June 7, 1971 |
| Legislative Agenda for 91st Congress | December 18, 1970 |
| Legislative Agenda for 91st Congress | September 10, 1970 |
| Defense Appropriations | December 15, 1969 |
| Defense Appropriations | July 17, 1969 |
| Defense Appropriations | October 2, 1968 |
| Committee on Intelligence Operations & Security Agency oversight | July 14, 1966 |
| Nike-Zeus production | April 11, 1963 |
| War front reports | October 7 & 8, 1943 |
| Naval battleships and aircraft carriers | June 26, 1942 |
| Impeachment of Judge Halsted L. Ritter | April 15 & 16, 1936 |
| William MacCracken contempt proceedings | February 13 & 14, 1934 |
| Investigation of ocean and air mail contracts involving William MacCracken and others | February 10, 1934 |
| Impeachment of Judge Harold Louderback | May 24, 1933 |

== See also ==
- Closed sessions of the United States House of Representatives
