= Bipartisan Women's Caucus =

Organization within the US House of Representatives

- Co-Chair: Monica De La Cruz (R-TX-15); Emilia Sykes (D-OH-13)
- Founded: April 19, 1977; 49 years ago
- Ideology: Women's issues
- Political position: Bipartisan
- Seats in the House Republican Conference: 32 / 219
- Seats in the House Democratic Caucus: 96 / 214
- Seats in the House: 128 / 435
- Seats in the Senate Republican Conference: 11 / 53
- Seats in the Senate Democratic Caucus: 16 / 47
- Seats in the Senate: 27 / 100

Website
- The Women's Caucus

Congressional Caucus for Women's Issues in the 118th United States Congress

The Bipartisan Women's Caucus (BWC), formerly known as the Congressional Caucus for Women's Issues is a bipartisan membership organization within the House of Representatives committed to advancing women's interests in Congress. It was founded by fifteen Congresswomen on April 19, 1977, and was originally known as the Congresswomen's Caucus. Its founding co-chairs were representatives Elizabeth Holtzman (N.Y.-Dem.) and Margaret Heckler (Mass.-Rep.). In 1981, men were invited to join and the name of the organization was therefore changed to the Congressional Caucus for Women's Issues. However, in January 1995, the U.S. House of Representatives voted to eliminate funding for offices and staff of caucus organizations on Capitol Hill; therefore, the congresswomen reorganized themselves into a members' organization. It is still called the Congressional Caucus for Women's Issues, but men no longer belong to it. Today its membership consists of all women in the U.S. House of Representatives.

Electoral participation data indicates that for more than 50 years, women have been voting in larger numbers than men. The CCWI was intended to address descriptive representation. With such few women in Congress, the legislative agenda was not representative of the wants and needs of female constituents. It was also a concern that the female representatives faced issues that wouldn't be addressed by the party organizations already established within Congress.

In 1990, the Congressional Caucus for Women's Issues inspired a House resolution to honor long-time caucus secretary Lindy Boggs by naming the room the caucus met in the Corrine "Lindy" Boggs Congressional Women's Reading Room, which it is known as today. It had previously been known as the Congresswomen's Reading Room.

== History ==
Despite changes in party control, political climate, and ideology throughout time, the presence of women has consistently made a difference in shaping debate and public policy outcomes in Congress.

Women interest groups have greatly impacted the policy process. However, they have been more successful in addressing issues considered by the general public, and other Congress members, to be of "role equity", rather than "role change". Therefore, many of the political solutions that have been pursued are to address economic inequality and perceived injustice. This is also a result of the Congressional Caucus of Women's Issues being bipartisan, and these issues not falling along party divides.

Women's interest groups have been responsible for substantial legislative, administrative, and judicial change, changes in female voting patterns, and an increase in the number of elected female officials.

=== 1950s-1960s ===
The House included approximately a dozen women in the 1950s. Even with women in office, women's views and interests were rarely addressed. In 1964, chairman of the Rules Committee, Howard Smith, introduced a sexual discrimination amendment to Title VII of the Civil Rights Act, in an attempt to make it too controversial to pass. His efforts failed in large part due to female legislators, when the Act passed anyways. However, the climate of insensitivity to women's rights and issues remained.

From the suffragist movement to the 1960s, the two political parties were split over women's issues. The Republican Party advocated for equal rights for women, while Democrats tended to lean toward protective legislation that would shield women from social and economic competition. During the 1960s, the parties began to converge on their views of women's issues, and there was a general consensus that women should have legal equality.

=== 1970s ===
By the end of the 1960s, both major parties appeared to be supportive of women's rights. The early 1970s are considered to be fairly bipartisan. However, there was a split toward the end of the 1970s, with Democrats being more likely to support women's issues than Republicans. During the early 1970s, many female representatives tried to organize a women's group within Congress. These efforts were unsuccessful, as many other congresswomen did not want to join the group, whether for structural or ideological reasons. By 1977, the women obstructing the formation of a group had left Congress and an organizational mock up for a congressional group dedicated to women's issues in the legislative branch was created. It was entitled the Congresswomen's Caucus.

Two developments created through the Legislative Reorganization Act of 1970 significantly affected women's policy advocacy in Congress. Partisan leaders' influence grew and began to over power committee chairmen. Prior to the 1970s, committee chairs were chosen based on seniority and there were no term limits. By taking the power away from these chairs, it allowed for women to get rid of bills that had been protected by committee chairmen who were anti women's interests. The previous seniority system and very few women in Congress made it hard for women to be put into position of power that would actually influence policy creation. However, this may have eventually resulted in more harm than good for those seeking policies addressing women's interests. As the power shifted toward party leadership, the climate in Congress became one of partisanship, which made it more difficult for congresswomen to support their initiatives. The Legislative Reorganization Act also made committee hearings more open to the public. The records being publicly exposed made it difficult for women to seek support from members who may want their support to remain private.

=== 1980s ===
Voting studies of the 1980 and 1984 elections showed that women vote differently than men. This divide between party alignment among the genders continued to the years of the Reagan administration, due to their perceived anti-women views of President Reagan and his supporters in Congress.

Due to the new Reagan administration, a more conservative national climate, and new House rules regarding financial support for caucuses, the CCWI went through a reorganization. Membership was opened to male representatives with an interest in advancing women's interests. The caucus changed its name to the Congressional Caucus for Women's Issues, or what it is currently known as. Only female members served on the executive committee, which drafted legislative policy and elected officers for the caucus. The Economic Equity Act became a key piece of legislation supported by the caucus during this time.

=== 1990s ===
In 1992 the "Year of the Woman" the 1992 election nearly doubled the number of women in the House of Representatives. Twenty four women were elected into positions, and twenty two of them joined the CCWI. A female representative was appointed to every House committee for the first time.

CCWI leadership established task forces, including those addressing women's health, violence against women, and economic and educational equity. The 103rd Congress was highly successful for the CCWI. They nearly doubled the measures they helped enact. Sixty-six Caucus-sponsored laws were enacted during the 103rd Congress, including groundbreaking policies addressing violence against women, women's health, working women, education, and families. Representative Olympia Snowe is quoted as saying, "For families with new babies or elderly parents who need care, for women who are afraid to walk down to their cars at night, for all who fear that breast cancer will deprive them of a mother, sister or daughter, this Congress has made a difference." The Congressional Caucus for Women's Issues published a "Summary of Legislative Action", which identified a number of legislative initiatives important for women and the family. Of the 74 legislative initiatives named in the summary, only 43, or 58%, came before the House floor.

The 1994 House of Representatives midterm elections concluded forty years of Democratic power. This resulted in a Republican majority determined to implement a conservative agenda. In order to enact the Contract with America, Newt Gingrich and GOP leaders restructured the House and party rules, centralizing power in their hands and stripping Democrats of any resources that could be used to delay the majority's initiatives. These reforms limited caucus' resources, including the elimination of an institutional budget, staff, and an official role in the lawmaking process. Informal House groups were a vulnerable target during the 104th Congress. The CCWI was then forced to go on the defensive to maintain legislation, instead of continuing to advocate for policies that would advance the rights of women. Also in 1994, Olympia Snowe and Patricia Schroeder, both who had chaired the CCWI for over ten years, gave up their positions. The caucus members revised the bylaws and established two-year terms for chairs, as well as new vice-chair positions.

Republican leadership in the House wished to rid all legislative service organizations, or specialized caucuses, of funding, offices, and staff. As a result, the CCWI restructured into a Congressional Membership Organization. The caucus changed back to include only female members of Congress. Former staff of the Congress created a non-profit 501(c)(3) called Women's Policy, Inc. in order to continue to provide research and information on women's issues for members of Congress.

=== 2000s ===
The 107th Congress was the first time that all women in the House joined the Congressional Caucus for Women's Issues. Each female representative is considered a member of the CCWI unless she opts out.

== Accomplishments ==
The list of the earliest legislative accomplishments of the Congressional Caucus for Women's Issues includes:

- The Pregnancy Discrimination Act
- The Child Support Enforcement Act
- The Retirement Equity Act
- The Civil Rights Restoration Act
- The Women's Business Ownership Act
- The Breast and Cervical Cancer Mortality Prevention Act
- The Mammography Quality Standards Act
- The Family and Medical Leave Act
- The Violence Against Women Act.

The influence of the CCWI extends beyond their legislative accomplishments, including bringing international attention to women's issues around the world and representing Congress at U.N. world conferences on women and on population and development. CCWI also serves as role models for women parliamentarians around the globe.

== Bipartisanship ==
The caucus was purposefully bipartisan because of this presumed role as collective representatives of the female experience. The climate of bipartisanship was maintained through unanimity rule, meaning that the caucus didn't take any action unless it was supported by every single member. As a result, some of the most controversial issues facing women, such as abortion, were not addressed by the caucus. However, members could individually support legislation on these issues. Since the structural changes in 1995, CCWI leadership has always included one Republican and one Democratic co-chair, as well as vice-chairs. These leaders are elected by members of their respective parties. Each political party is able to have a say in the leadership and direction of the CCWI. Democratic and Republican congresswomen attempt to put away their partisan differences in order to promote policies to address women's issues.

Although political parties hold the majority of power and there are rules that specifically limit caucuses' resources, legislators are given complete discretion over their caucus membership decisions, which allows them to tailor their memberships to include caucuses that address issues specific to their constituents. Although caucus membership may be indicative of legislators' own policy interests, legislators are typically interested in being members of caucuses that focus on issues of interest to their constituents. If their constituents have strong ties to an issue, legislators are who represent them are more likely to belong to caucuses devoted to that issue, even once they account for potential impact of party status, committee membership, electoral vulnerability, and their own opinions. This means that if constituents were passionate about women's issues, a legislator may join the CCWI, even if their party's particular views may not align with policies created by the caucus.

In a study examining the support for legislative initiatives in the 103rd Congress, it was found that ideological conservatism decreases one's support for women's issues and being a female Democrat increases the number of women's issues they supported. The Congressional Caucus for Women's Issues is bipartisan and consists of both Republican and Democratic congresswomen, but evidence suggests that partisanship does play a role in support of legislation regarding women's issues.

Those who identify with the Democratic Party have more favorable opinions of women in leadership positions, both within government and business. The Democratic Party is also the predominant party of elected female officials. Women in the Democratic party are strong proponents of female political leaders, more so than Democratic men or Republican women. Compared with Republicans, Democrats as a whole are significantly more likely to say that women do a better job in terms of political leadership qualities. Republicans do not necessarily favor men but are likely to say there isn't a difference between men and women.

=== Perception of Republicans' attitude toward women's issues ===
Although once an advocate for equal legal rights for women (from suffragism to the 1960s), the Republican Party began a role reversal in the early 1970s by backing away from legal equality and not accepting the Supreme Court's stance on abortion rights. These issues didn't create a gender gap at the time, but did create a perception that Democrats were reaching out to women as constituents and Republicans were not.

In 2012, Republican representative Todd Akin suggested a woman's body would prevent pregnancy from a "legitimate rape", and Richard E. Mourdock lost his Senate race in Indiana after saying it was "God's Will" when pregnancy resulted from rape. Comments like this, and other conservative policy agendas, like defunding Planned Parenthood, make it appear as though the Republican party works against women's issues. John Weaver, a senior Republican strategist, is quoted as saying, "We have a significant problem with female voters." Democrats are seen as making the entire Republican party as insensitive to women. However, Republicans' focus on social issues, such as proposals to defund Planned Parenthood and fighting against the Obama administration’s ruling that insurance companies must cover contraceptives, are what result in the creation of these perceptions.

Women like Senator Susan Collins, a Republican from Maine, believes the perception of the Republican Party as a whole against women is a "myth manufactured by Democrats in Washington." She views the Republican Party as one of individual freedom and personal responsibility, and therefore the government shouldn't even be involved in issues such as abortion. Therefore, it is evident that not all Republicans are against women's issues, despite any perception that may be propagated in the media. However, there is a disparity between female voters for Republicans and Democrats: President Obama beat Mitt Romney in the 2012 presidential race by eleven points among women.

== List of chairs and ranking members ==
Start	End	Chair	Co-Chair
April 19, 1977	January 3, 1979	Liz Holtzman (NY)	Margaret Heckler (MA)
January 3, 1979	January 3, 1983	Pat Schroeder (CO)	Margaret Heckler (MA)
January 3, 1983	January 3, 1995	Pat Schroeder (CO)	Olympia Snowe (ME)
January 3, 1995	January 3, 1997	Connie Morella (MD)	Nita Lowey (NY)
January 3, 1997	January 3, 1999	Nancy Johnson (CT)	Eleanor Holmes Norton (DC)
January 3, 1999	January 3, 2001	Sue Kelly (NY)	Carolyn Maloney (NY)
January 3, 2001	January 3, 2003	Judy Biggert (IL)	Juanita Millender-McDonald (CA)
January 3, 2003	January 3, 2005	Shelley Moore Capito (WV)	Louise Slaughter (NY)
January 3, 2005	January 3, 2007	Ginny Brown-Waite (FL)	Hilda Solis (CA)
January 3, 2007	January 3, 2009	Lois Capps (CA)	Cathy McMorris Rodgers (WA)
January 3, 2009	January 3, 2011	Jan Schakowsky (IL)	Mary Fallin (OK)
January 3, 2011	January 3, 2013	Cynthia Lummis (WY)	Gwen Moore (WI)
January 3, 2013	January 3, 2015	Jaime Herrera Beutler (WA)	Donna Edwards (MD)
January 3, 2015	January 3, 2017	Kristi Noem (SD)	Doris Matsui (CA)
January 3, 2017	January 3, 2019	Susan Brooks (IN)	Lois Frankel (FL)
January 3, 2019	January 3, 2021	Brenda Lawrence (MI)	Debbie Lesko (AZ)
January 3, 2021	January 3, 2023	Madeleine Dean (PA)	Jenniffer González (PR)
January 3, 2023	January 3, 2025	Kat Cammack (FL)	Susie Lee (NV)
January 3, 2025	present	Monica De La Cruz (TX)	Emilia Sykes (OH)

== See also ==
- Democratic Women's Caucus
- Republican Women's Caucus
