= United States House Energy Subcommittee on Energy =

Subcommittee of Committee on Energy and Commerce
- Active United States House of Representatives; 119th Congress

Leadership
- Chair: Bob Latta (R)
- Ranking Member: Kathy Castor (D)

Structure
- Seats: 30 (30 currently filled) 17/17 13/13
- Political parties: Majority (17): Republican (17); Minority (13): Democratic (13)

Meeting place
- 2125, Rayburn House Office Building; Washington, D.C. 20515

Phone number
- (202)-225-3641

The Subcommittee on Energy, Climate and Grid Security is a subcommittee within the United States House Committee on Energy and Commerce. It was formed during the 112th Congress from the Energy and Environment Subcommittee when a new Environment and Economy Subcommittee was created. Until the 118th Congress, it was named the Subcommittee on Energy. The committee also had responsibility for climate policy transferred to it from the United States House Energy Subcommittee on Environment and Climate Change in the 118th Congress.

== Jurisdiction ==
The Subcommittee's jurisdiction includes national energy policy generally; fossil energy, renewable energy resources and synthetic fuels; energy conservation; energy information; energy regulation and utilization; utility issues and regulation of nuclear facilities; interstate energy compacts; nuclear energy and waste; the Clean Air Act; all laws, programs, and government activities affecting such matters; and Homeland security-related aspects of the foregoing.

== Members, 119th Congress ==
Majority	Minority
Bob Latta, Ohio, Chair; Randy Weber, Texas, Vice Chair; Gary Palmer, Alabama; Rick Allen, Georgia; Troy Balderson, Ohio; August Pfluger, Texas; Diana Harshbarger, Tennessee; Mariannette Miller-Meeks, Iowa; John James, Michigan; Cliff Bentz, Oregon; Russell Fry, South Carolina; Laurel Lee, Florida; Nick Langworthy, New York; Michael Rulli, Ohio; Gabe Evans, Colorado; Craig Goldman, Texas; Julie Fedorchak, North Dakota	Kathy Castor, Florida, Ranking Member; Scott Peters, California; Rob Menendez, New Jersey; Kevin Mullin, California; Jennifer McClellan, Virginia; Diana DeGette, Colorado; Doris Matsui, California; Paul Tonko, New York; Marc Veasey, Texas; Kim Schrier, Washington; Lizzie Fletcher, Texas; Alexandria Ocasio-Cortez, New York; Jake Auchincloss, Massachusetts
Ex officio
Brett Guthrie, Kentucky	Frank Pallone, New Jersey

== Historical membership rosters ==
=== 115th Congress ===
Majority	Minority
Fred Upton, Michigan, Chair; Pete Olson, Texas, Vice Chair; Joe Barton, Texas; John Shimkus, Illinois; Tim Murphy, Pennsylvania; Bob Latta, Ohio; Gregg Harper, Mississippi; David McKinley, West Virginia; Adam Kinzinger, Illinois; Morgan Griffith, Virginia; Bill Johnson, Ohio; Billy Long, Missouri; Larry Bucshon, Indiana; Bill Flores, Texas; Markwayne Mullin, Oklahoma; Richard Hudson, North Carolina; Kevin Cramer, North Dakota; Tim Walberg, Michigan	Bobby Rush, Illinois, Ranking Member; Jerry McNerney, California; Scott Peters, California; Gene Green, Texas; Mike Doyle, Pennsylvania; Kathy Castor, Florida; John Sarbanes, Maryland; Peter Welch, Vermont; Paul Tonko, New York; Dave Loebsack, Iowa; Kurt Schrader, Oregon; Joe Kennedy III, Massachusetts; G. K. Butterfield, North Carolina
Ex officio
Greg Walden, Oregon	Frank Pallone, New Jersey

=== 116th Congress ===
Majority	Minority
Bobby Rush, Illinois, Chair; Scott Peters, California; Mike Doyle, Pennsylvania; John Sarbanes, Maryland; Jerry McNerney, California; Paul Tonko, New York; Dave Loebsack, Iowa; G. K. Butterfield, North Carolina; Peter Welch, Vermont; Kurt Schrader, Oregon; Joe Kennedy III, Massachusetts; Marc Veasey, Texas; Annie Kuster, New Hampshire; Robin Kelly, Illinois; Nanette Barragán, California; Donald McEachin, Virginia; Tom O'Halleran, Arizona; Lisa Blunt Rochester, Delaware	Fred Upton, Michigan, Ranking Member; Bob Latta, Ohio; Cathy McMorris Rodgers, Washington; Pete Olson, Texas; David McKinley, West Virginia; Adam Kinzinger, Illinois; Morgan Griffith, Virginia; Bill Johnson, Ohio; Larry Bucshon, Indiana; Bill Flores, Texas; Richard Hudson, North Carolina; Tim Walberg, Michigan; Jeff Duncan, South Carolina
Ex officio
Frank Pallone, New Jersey	Greg Walden, Oregon

=== 117th Congress ===
Majority	Minority
Bobby Rush, Illinois, Chair; Scott Peters, California; Mike Doyle, Pennsylvania; Jerry McNerney, California, Vice Chair; Paul Tonko, New York; Marc Veasey, Texas; Kim Schrier, Washington; Diana DeGette, Colorado; G. K. Butterfield, North Carolina; Doris Matsui, California; Kathy Castor, Florida; Peter Welch, Vermont; Kurt Schrader, Oregon; Annie Kuster, New Hampshire; Nanette Barragán, California; Donald McEachin, Virginia; Lisa Blunt Rochester, Delaware; Tom O'Halleran, Arizona	Fred Upton, Michigan, Ranking Member; Michael C. Burgess, Texas; Bob Latta, Ohio; David McKinley, West Virginia; Adam Kinzinger, Illinois; Morgan Griffith, Virginia; Bill Johnson, Ohio; Larry Bucshon, Indiana; Tim Walberg, Michigan; Jeff Duncan, South Carolina; Gary Palmer, Alabama; Debbie Lesko, Arizona; Greg Pence, Indiana; Kelly Armstrong, North Dakota
Ex officio
Frank Pallone, New Jersey	Cathy McMorris Rodgers, Washington

=== 118th Congress ===
Majority	Minority
Jeff Duncan, South Carolina, Chair; John Curtis, Utah, Vice Chair; Michael C. Burgess, Texas; Bob Latta, Ohio; Brett Guthrie, Kentucky; Morgan Griffith, Virginia; Bill Johnson, Ohio; Larry Bucshon, Indiana; Tim Walberg, Michigan; Gary Palmer, Alabama; Debbie Lesko, Arizona; Greg Pence, Indiana; Kelly Armstrong, North Dakota; Randy Weber, Texas; Troy Balderson, Ohio; August Pfluger, Texas	Diana DeGette, Colorado, Ranking Member; Scott Peters, California; Lizzie Fletcher, Texas; Doris Matsui, California; Paul Tonko, New York; Marc Veasey, Texas; Annie Kuster, New Hampshire; Kim Schrier, Washington; Kathy Castor, Florida; Lisa Blunt Rochester, Delaware; John Sarbanes, Maryland; Tony Cardenas, California
Ex officio
Cathy McMorris Rodgers, Washington	Frank Pallone, New Jersey
