= Medicare for All Caucus =

United States Congressional caucus

- Co-Chairs: Debbie Dingell, Pramila Jayapal
- Founded: July 19, 2018; 8 years ago
- Ideology: Right to health Single-payer healthcare Progressivism; Support for the Medicare for All Act
- National affiliation: Democratic Party
- Colors: Blue
- Seats in the House: 58 / 435
- Seats in the House Democratic Caucus: 58 / 212

The Medicare for All Caucus is a congressional caucus in the United States House of Representatives, consisting of members that advocate for the implementation of a single-payer healthcare system. It was announced by progressive members of the House of Representatives in July 2018 with over 70 founding members, all Democrats.

== Electoral results ==
=== House of Representatives ===
Year	Seats	±
2018	78 / 435	
2020	75 / 435	▼ -3
2022	58 / 435	▼ -17

== Members ==
The caucus as of January 12, 2019. Members

Arizona
- Ruben Gallego (D‑AZ‑3)
- Raúl Grijalva (D‑AZ‑7)

California

- Jared Huffman (D‑CA‑2)
- John Garamendi (D‑CA‑8)
- Mark DeSaulnier (D‑CA‑10)
- Barbara Lee (D‑CA‑12)
- Ro Khanna (D‑CA‑17)
- Zoe Lofgren (D‑CA‑18)
- Jimmy Panetta (D‑CA‑19)
- Judy Chu (D‑CA‑28)
- Grace Napolitano (D‑CA‑31)
- Jimmy Gomez (D‑CA‑34)
- Ted Lieu (D‑CA‑36)
- Mark Takano (D‑CA‑39)
- Maxine Waters (D‑CA‑43)
- Nanette Barragán (D‑CA‑44)
- Sara Jacobs (D‑CA‑51)

Colorado

- Joe Neguse (D‑CO‑2) – vice chair

District of Columbia

- Eleanor Holmes Norton (D‑DC‑AL) (non-voting delegate)

Florida

- Darren Soto (D‑FL‑9)
- Kathy Castor (D‑FL‑14)
- Lois Frankel (D‑FL‑22)
- Frederica Wilson (D‑FL‑24)

Georgia

- Hank Johnson (D‑GA‑4)

Illinois

- Robin Kelly (D‑IL‑2)
- Danny K. Davis (D‑IL‑7)
- Jan Schakowsky (D‑IL‑9)

Indiana

- André Carson (D‑IN‑7)

Maine

- Chellie Pingree (D‑ME‑1)

Maryland

- Jamie Raskin (D‑MD‑8)

Massachusetts

- Jim McGovern (D‑MA‑2)
- Katherine Clark (D‑MA‑5)
- Ayanna Pressley (D‑MA‑7)

Michigan

- Debbie Dingell (D‑MI‑6) – co-chair
- Rashida Tlaib (D‑MI‑12)

Minnesota

- Ilhan Omar (D‑MN‑5) – vice chair>

Nevada

- Dina Titus (D‑NV‑1)

New Jersey

- Bonnie Watson Coleman (D‑NJ‑12)

New York

- Grace Meng (D‑NY‑6)
- Nydia Velázquez (D‑NY‑7)
- Yvette Clarke (D‑NY‑9)
- Jerrold Nadler (D‑NY‑12)
- Adriano Espaillat (D‑NY‑13)
- Alexandria Ocasio-Cortez (D‑NY‑14)
- Paul Tonko (D‑NY‑20)
- Brian Higgins (D‑NY‑26)

Ohio

- Joyce Beatty (D‑OH‑3)

Oregon

- Suzanne Bonamici (D‑OR‑1)
- Earl Blumenauer (D‑OR‑3) (retired in 2024)

Pennsylvania

- Brendan Boyle (D‑PA‑2)
- Dwight Evans (D‑PA‑3)

Tennessee

- Steve Cohen (D‑TN‑9)

Texas

- Al Green (D‑TX‑9)
- Marc Veasey (D‑TX‑33)
- Vicente González (D‑TX‑34)

Virginia

- Bobby Scott (D‑VA‑3)
- Don Beyer (D‑VA‑8)

Washington

- Pramila Jayapal (D‑WA‑7) – co-chair
- Adam Smith (D‑WA‑9)

Wisconsin

- Mark Pocan (D‑WI‑2)

== Former members ==
California

- Jerry McNerney (CA-9) retired
- Karen Bass (CA-37) – retired in 2022 to run for Mayor of Los Angeles (elected)
- Lucille Roybal-Allard (CA-40) retired
- Alan Lowenthal (CA-47) retired

Colorado

- Jared Polis (CO-2) – retired in 2018 to run for governor of Colorado (elected)

Hawaii

- Tulsi Gabbard (HI-2) – retired in 2020 during her run for President (lost primary); left Democratic Party in 2022

Georgia

- John Lewis (GA-5) deceased

Florida

- Alcee Hastings (FL-20) deceased

Kentucky

- John Yarmuth (KY-3) retired

Maryland

- Anthony Brown (MD-4) ran for Attorney General of Maryland (elected)

Massachusetts

- Mike Capuano – defeated in 2018 primary by current Rep. Ayanna Pressley (MA-7), who, as of September 2018, does favor Medicare-for All.

Michigan

- Andy Levin (MI-9) lost redistricting race to Haley Stevens.
- Brenda Lawrence (MI-14) retired

Minnesota

- Keith Ellison, retired and ran for Attorney General of Minnesota (elected)
- Rick Nolan, retired

Missouri

- William Lacy Clay, defeated in 2020 primary by current Rep. Cori Bush (MO-1), who, as of January 2021, does favor Medicare for All.

New York

- Carolyn Maloney (NY-12) – lost redistricting race to Jerrold Nadler in 2022
- José Serrano (NY-15) retired
- Eliot Engel – defeated in 2020 primary by current Rep. Jamaal Bowman (NY-16), who, as of December 2020, does favor Medicare for All.

Ohio

- Marcia Fudge (OH-11) – appointed United States Secretary of Housing and Urban Development in 2021.
- Tim Ryan (OH-13) – ran for U.S. Senate in 2022 (won primary but lost general election)

Oregon

- Peter DeFazio (OR-4) retired

Pennsylvania

- Mike Doyle (PA-18) retired.

Rhode Island

- David Cicilline (RI-1) – resigned in June 2023 to accept role as president of the Rhode Island Foundation.

Texas

- Sheila Jackson Lee (TX-18) – deceased.

Vermont

- Peter Welch (VT-AL) – retired in 2022 to run for U.S. Senate (and elected).
