= United States House Energy Subcommittee on Environment =

Subcommittee of Committee on Energy and Commerce
- Active United States House of Representatives; 119th Congress

Leadership
- Chair: Gary Palmer (R)
- Ranking Member: Paul Tonko (D)

Structure
- Seats: 23 (23 currently filled) 13/13 10/10
- Political parties: Majority (13): Republican (13); Minority (10): Democratic (10)

Meeting place
- 2125, Rayburn House Office Building; Washington, D.C. 20515

Phone number
- (202)-225-3641

The Energy Subcommittee on Environment is a subcommittee within the House Committee on Energy and Commerce. Prior to 2009, it was known as the Subcommittee on Environment and Hazardous Materials; it was part of the Subcommittee on Energy and Environment from 2009 to 2011. In December 2010, Representative Fred Upton, the incoming chairman of the Energy and Commerce Committee for the 112th Congress, announced his intention to establish the Environment and Economy Subcommittee as a separate subcommittee. In January 2023, new Chair of the full committee Cathy McMorris Rodgers amended the subcommittee's jurisdiction, transferring responsibility for climate policy to the United States House Energy Subcommittee on Energy, Climate and Grid Security, while adding broader manufacturing policy to the jurisdiction of this subcommittee.

== Jurisdiction ==
According to its website the subcommittee dealt with the following; "All matters related to soil, air, and water contamination, including Superfund and the Resource Conservation and Recovery Act; the regulation of solid, hazardous, and nuclear wastes, including mining, nuclear, oil, gas, and coal combustion waste; the Clean Air Act and air emissions; emergency environmental response; industrial plant security, including cybersecurity; the regulation of drinking water (Safe Drinking Water Act), including underground injection of fluids (e.g., deep well injection or hydrofracking); toxic substances (Toxic Substances Control Act); noise; and all aspects of the above-referenced jurisdiction related to the Department of Homeland Security."

== Members, 119th Congress ==
Majority	Minority
Morgan Griffith, Virginia, Chair; Dan Crenshaw, Texas, Vice Chair; Bob Latta, Ohio; Buddy Carter, Georgia; Gary Palmer, Alabama; John Joyce, Pennsylvania; Randy Weber, Texas; August Pfluger, Texas; Mariannette Miller-Meeks, Iowa; Laurel Lee, Florida; Nick Langworthy, New York; Gabe Evans, Colorado; Julie Fedorchak, North Dakota	Paul Tonko, New York, Ranking Member; Jan Schakowsky, Illinois; Raul Ruiz, California; Scott Peters, California; Nanette Barragán, California; Darren Soto, Florida; Jake Auchincloss, Massachusetts; Troy Carter, Louisiana; Rob Menendez, New Jersey; Greg Landsman, Ohio
Ex officio
Brett Guthrie, Kentucky	Frank Pallone, New Jersey

== Historical membership rosters ==
=== 115th Congress ===
Majority	Minority
John Shimkus, Illinois, Chair; David McKinley, West Virginia, Vice Chair; Joe Barton, Texas; Timothy F. Murphy, Pennsylvania; Marsha Blackburn, Tennessee; Gregg Harper, Mississippi; Pete Olson, Texas; Bill Johnson, Ohio; Bill Flores, Texas; Richard Hudson, North Carolina; Kevin Cramer, North Dakota; Tim Walberg, Michigan; Buddy Carter, Georgia	Paul Tonko, New York, Ranking Member; Raul Ruiz, California; Scott Peters, California; Gene Green, Texas; Diana DeGette, Colorado; Jerry McNerney, California; Tony Cárdenas, California; Debbie Dingell, Michigan; Doris Matsui, California
Ex officio
Greg Walden, Oregon	Frank Pallone, New Jersey

=== 116th Congress ===
Majority	Minority
Paul Tonko, New York, Chair; Yvette Clarke, New York; Scott Peters, California; Nanette Barragán, California; Donald McEachin, Virginia; Lisa Blunt Rochester, Delaware; Darren Soto, Florida; Diana DeGette, Colorado; Jan Schakowsky, Illinois; Doris Matsui, California; Jerry McNerney, California; Raul Ruiz, California; Debbie Dingell, Michigan	John Shimkus, Illinois, Ranking Member; Cathy McMorris Rodgers, Washington; David McKinley, West Virginia; Bill Johnson, Ohio; Billy Long, Missouri; Bill Flores, Texas; Markwayne Mullin, Oklahoma; Buddy Carter, Georgia; Jeff Duncan, South Carolina
Ex officio
Frank Pallone, New Jersey	Greg Walden, Oregon

=== 117th Congress ===
Majority	Minority
Paul Tonko, New York, Chair; Diana DeGette, Colorado; Jan Schakowsky, Illinois; John Sarbanes, Maryland; Yvette Clarke, New York; Raul Ruiz, California, Vice Chair; Scott Peters, California; Debbie Dingell, Michigan; Nanette Barragán, California; Donald McEachin, Virginia; Lisa Blunt Rochester, Delaware; Darren Soto, Florida; Tom O'Halleran, Arizona	David McKinley, West Virginia, Ranking Member; Bill Johnson, Ohio; Markwayne Mullin, Oklahoma; Richard Hudson, North Carolina; Buddy Carter, Georgia; Jeff Duncan, South Carolina; Gary Palmer, Alabama; John Curtis, Utah; Dan Crenshaw, Texas
Ex officio
Frank Pallone, New Jersey	Cathy McMorris Rodgers, Washington

=== 118th Congress ===
Majority	Minority
Buddy Carter, Georgia, Chair; John Joyce, Pennsylvania, Vice Chair; Bill Johnson, Ohio; Gary Palmer, Alabama; Dan Crenshaw, Texas; Randy Weber, Texas; Rick Allen, Georgia; Troy Balderson, Ohio; Russ Fulcher, Idaho; August Pfluger, Texas; Mariannette Miller-Meeks, Iowa; Jay Obernolte, California	Paul Tonko, New York, Ranking Member; Diana DeGette, Colorado; Jan Schakowsky, Illinois; John Sarbanes, Maryland; Yvette Clarke, New York; Raul Ruiz, California; Scott Peters, California; Nanette Barragán, California
Ex officio
Cathy McMorris Rodgers, Washington	Frank Pallone, New Jersey
