= Raul Ruiz (politician) =

American physician and politician (born 1972)

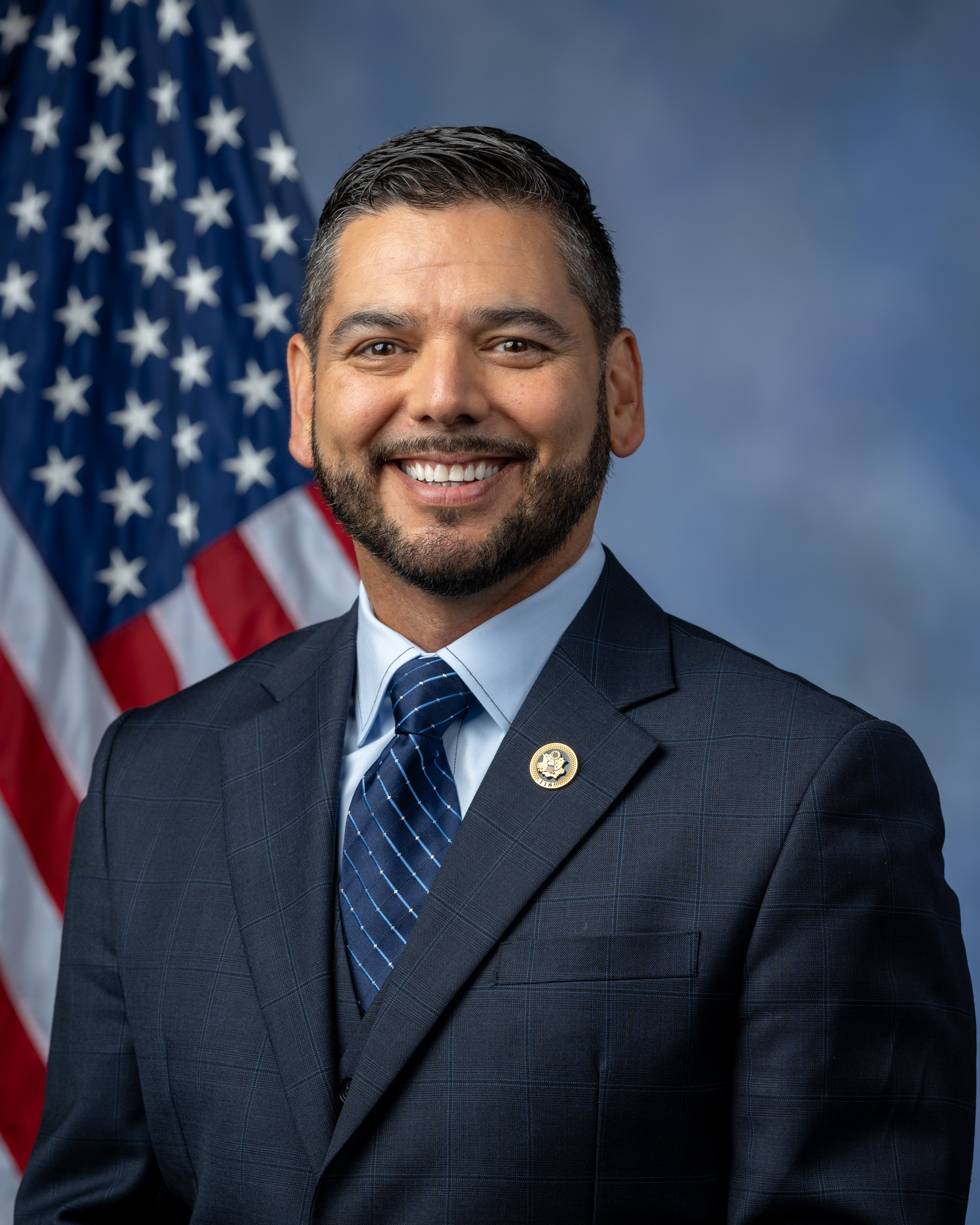
- Official portrait, 2024

Member of the U.S. House of Representatives from California
- Incumbent
- Assumed office January 3, 2013
- Preceded by: Mary Bono
- Constituency: 36th district (2013–2023); 25th district (2023–present)

Personal details
- Born: August 25, 1972 (age 54) Zacatecas City, Mexico
- Party: Democratic
- Spouse: Monica Rivers (m. 2014)
- Children: 2
- Education: University of California, Los Angeles (BS); Harvard University (MD, MPP, MPH)
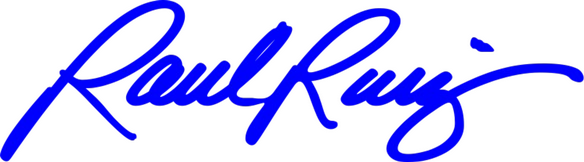
- Signature
- Website: House website Campaign website
- Ruiz's voice Ruiz calling to honor U.S. servicemen with the Congressional Gold Medal. Recorded October 26, 2021

Raul Ruiz (/rɑːˈuːl/ rah-OOL; born August 25, 1972) is an American physician and politician serving as the U.S. representative for California's 25th congressional district. He is a member of the Democratic Party.

Born in Zacatecas City, Mexico, Ruiz was adopted by his father's sister in Coachella, California after his mother's death. He was the first Latino to receive three graduate degrees from Harvard University, attending Harvard Medical School, the John F. Kennedy School of Government and Harvard School of Public Health. He worked as an emergency physician at the Eisenhower Medical Center in Rancho Mirage, California. He assisted humanitarian efforts in the aftermath of the 2010 Haiti earthquake.

In what was considered a major upset, Ruiz defeated redistricted incumbent Republican U.S. Representative Mary Bono in the 2012 election with 52.9% of the vote. He was reelected in 2014 with 54.2% of the vote, after what was considered one of the most competitive congressional races in the country; in 2016 and 2018, he received about 60% of the vote.

== Early life and education ==
Ruiz was born in Zacatecas City, the capital city of state of Zacatecas, Mexico. His mother died a few months later, and his father give him up for adoption to his sister, who raised him in Coachella, California. His adoptive uncles were farm workers. He graduated from Coachella Valley High School at age 17 and went to the University of California, Los Angeles in 1990, graduating magna cum laude before attending Harvard Medical School. He was the first Latino to receive three graduate degrees from Harvard University: a Doctor of Medicine from the Harvard Medical School, a Master of Public Policy from the John F. Kennedy School of Government, and a Master of Public Health from the Harvard School of Public Health.

== Medical career ==
After graduating from Harvard, Ruiz spent time working abroad in Mexico, El Salvador, and Serbia, and completed emergency medicine residency training at the University of Pittsburgh School of Medicine in 2006 before taking a job as an emergency physician at the Eisenhower Medical Center, a nonprofit hospital in the Coachella Valley. He founded the Coachella Valley Healthcare Initiative in 2010. In 2011, he became senior associate dean at the School of Medicine at University of California, Riverside.

In 2012, Ruiz received a Commander's Award for Public Service from the U.S. Army's 82nd Airborne Division for his humanitarian efforts for victims of the 2010 Haiti earthquake.

== U.S. House of Representatives ==
=== Elections ===
==== 2012 ====
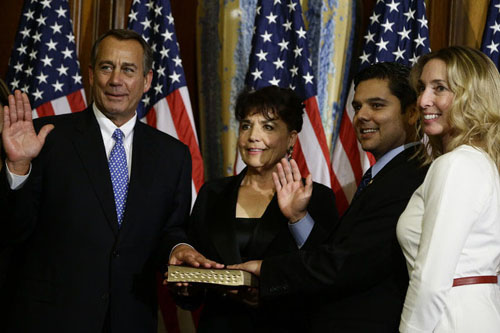
Ruiz is sworn into the 113th Congress, 2013

Ruiz ran for the United States House of Representatives in 2012 as a first-time candidate in California's 36th congressional district. The district had previously been the 45th, represented by 15-year incumbent Mary Bono Mack and previously by her late husband Sonny Bono. Ruiz was initially regarded as a long shot to win. He was endorsed by Bill Clinton in October 2012. The new district was significantly more Latino than its predecessor; Latinos now made up almost half its population. Ruiz appealed to them by running Spanish-language ads. He criticized Bono Mack for not reaching out to Latino voters sooner saying, "She’s had 14 years to give them the attention that they deserve. This is unacceptable."

During the 2012 campaign, Bono Mack accused Ruiz of being a "radical" for participating in anti-Thanksgiving protests in the 1990s while at Harvard and repeatedly referred to Ruiz's 1997 arrest. Ruiz had allegedly supported "Smashing Plymouth Rock. Crush the rock and all it represents." At a debate, Bono Mack repeatedly attacked Ruiz for his participation in the protests and arrest, while Ruiz accused her of ignoring issues and tying her to the Republican presidential ticket.

At an October 2012 press conference, Bono Mack campaign officials released an audiotape on which Ruiz expressed solidarity with convicted police murderer Mumia Abu-Jamal and read a letter of support for Leonard Peltier, who was convicted in 1977 of murdering two FBI agents in South Dakota. On the tape, supposedly recorded at a 1999 Thanksgiving rally, Ruiz read aloud a letter to Peltier from a Marxist leader, "Subcomandante Marcos." It read in part: "Leonard Peltier's most serious crime is that he seeks to rescue in the past, and in his culture, in his roots, the history of his people, the Lakota. And for the powerful, this is a crime because knowing oneself with history impedes from being tossed around by this absurd machine that is in the system." A spokesman for Ruiz maintained that the candidate did not recall the incident and did not support Peltier.

He was elected with 52.9% of the vote to Bono Mack's 47.1%. "If the growing sway of Latinos in American politics was the story of election 2012", wrote Politico after the 2012 election, "Raul Ruiz's triumph in California's 36th congressional district was a dramatic subplot." Republicans "didn't seem to fully appreciate the district's fast-growing Hispanic population until it was too late." Ruiz told Politico that his victory was "a reflection of America." Upon taking office in January 2013, he became the first Democrat to represent this district since its creation in 1983 (it had been the 37th from 1983 to 1993, the 44th from 1993 to 2003, and the 45th from 2003 to 2013).

==== 2014 ====
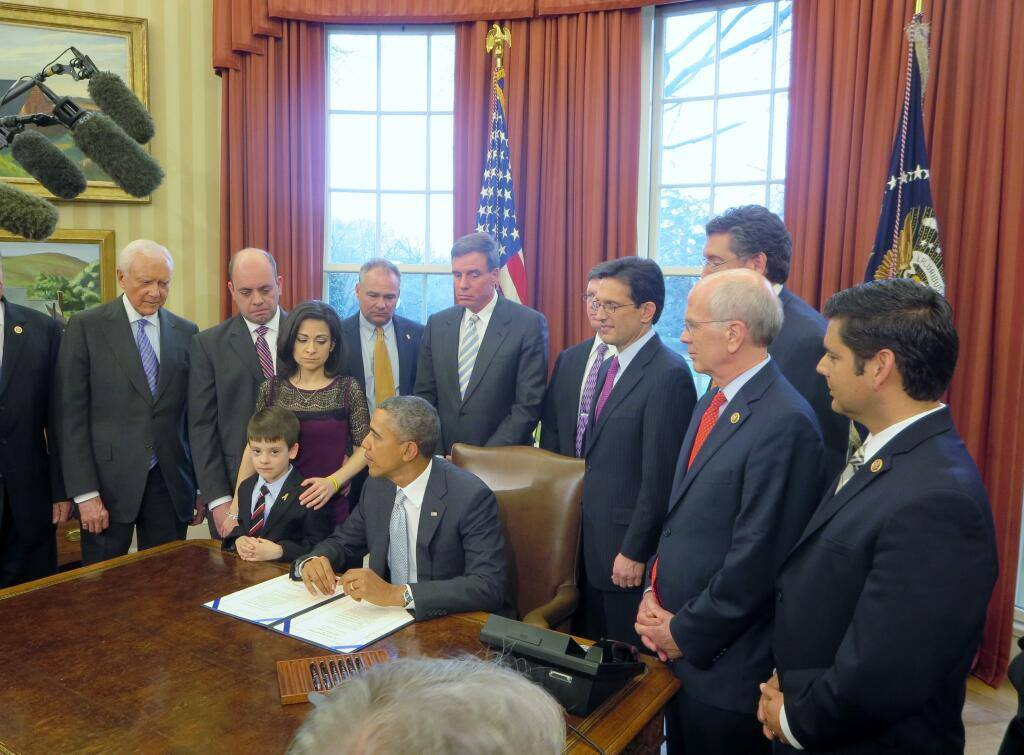
Ruiz and a group of bipartisan lawmakers join President Obama at the bill signing of the Kids First Research Act in the Oval Office, 2014

Ruiz competed in the top-two primary on June 3, finishing first with 50.3% of the vote. He then faced the Republican nominee, state assemblyman Brian Nestande, in the November 4 general election. Despite being considered one of the most vulnerable incumbent members of the House, Ruiz was reelected with 54.2% of the vote to Nestande's 45.8%.

==== 2016 ====
Ruiz's 2016 campaign focused largely on his successful attempt to secure funds for the Salton Sea Red Hill Bay restoration project and his efforts on behalf of veterans.

Ruiz was elected to a third term in November, receiving 60% of the vote, over Republican state Senator Jeff Stone.

After winning, Ruiz spoke critically about "the politics of fear" and "hateful rhetoric." Addressing his supporters in Rancho Mirage, he said, "I believe that we need to come together as a nation. I believe we need to heal our wounds and put people above partisanship and solutions above ideology."

==== 2018 ====
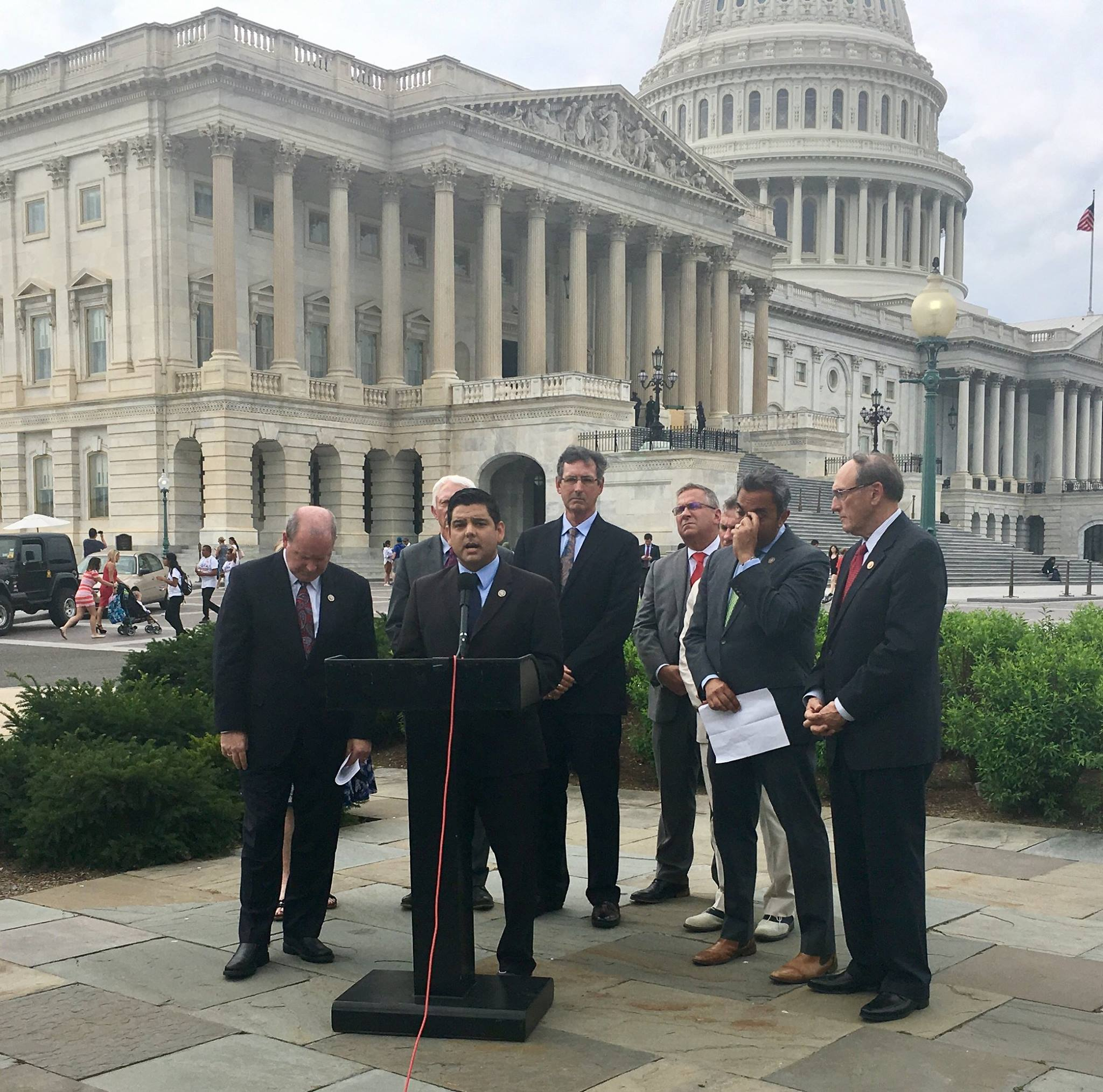
Ruiz speaks against Medicare cuts, 2017

In October 2017, soap opera actress Kimberlin Brown, a pro-Trump Republican, announced that she would challenge Ruiz in 2018. Criticizing Ruiz for not passing any "meaningful" legislation, Brown said, "For the first time in the history of our great country, we are not leaving something better behind for the next generation." Brown, known for The Bold and the Beautiful, runs a design firm and has co-managed an avocado farm with her husband.

Ruiz was reelected with 59% of the vote.

==== 2020 ====
Ruiz was reelected, defeating Republican challenger Erin Cruz, an author and a candidate for the United States Senate in 2018, with 60.3% of the vote.

==== 2022 ====
Due to redistricting, Ruiz chose to run in the newly drawn 25th Congressional district in 2022, citing his roots in Coachella. In the primary, Ruiz won 56% of the vote and Republican Brian Hawkins, a San Jacinto city councilmember, came in second with 16%. In the general election, Ruiz won with 57% to Hawkins 42%.

==== 2024 ====
In the 2024 election for California's 25th congressional district, Ruiz was reelected, defeating Republican Ian Weeks with 56.3% of the vote to Weeks' 43.7%.

=== Tenure ===
Ruiz was sworn into office on January 3, 2013, as the U.S. representative for California's 36th congressional district. During the 113th Congress, he served on the Veterans' Affair and Natural Resources committees. In May, Ruiz voted against repealing the Affordable Care Act which he supported during his campaign.

In 2014, Ruiz voted for HR 4038, legislation that would effectively halt the resettlement of refugees from Syria and Iraq to the United States.

In 2017, Ruiz was appointed to the House Committee on Energy and Commerce, which oversees healthcare policy. That year he called Obamacare "a giant step in the right direction" while acknowledging that "it is imperfect and needs to be improved." He maintained that the GOP plan would "make premiums and deductibles go up even higher, 24 million will be uninsured...and there will be reduced reimbursement rates to hospitals and doctors for patients on Medicaid...There's nothing to reduce health care costs and out-of-pocket payments." Ruiz said that Obamacare represented "one of the largest improvements in covering Latinos with health insurance."

=== Committee assignments ===
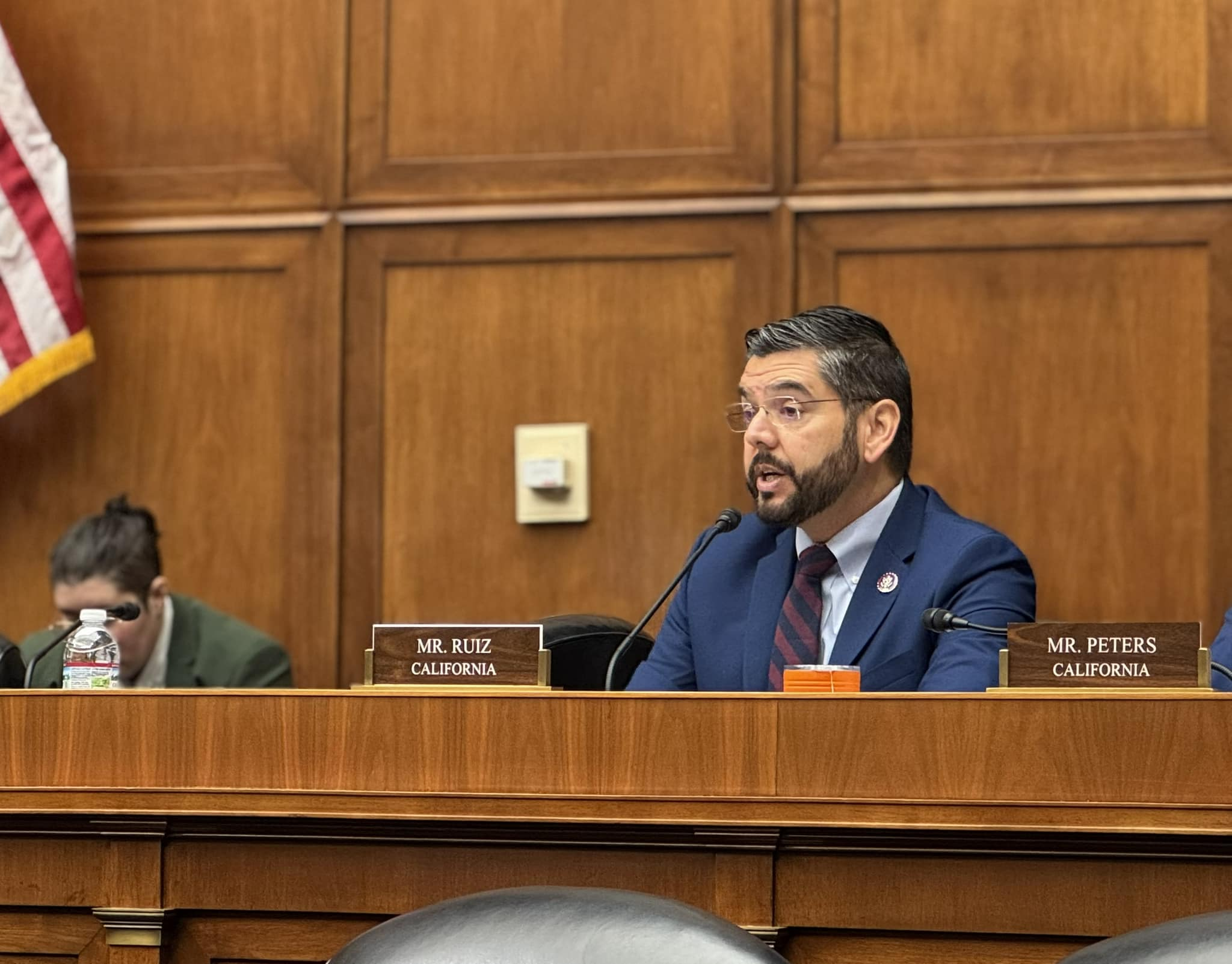
Ruiz on the Energy and Commerce Committee, 2025

Ruiz's committee assignments for the 119th Congress include:

- Committee on Energy and Commerce
  - Subcommittee on Communications and Technology
  - Subcommittee on Health
  - Subcommittee on Environment

=== Caucus memberships ===
Ruiz's caucus memberships include:

- Congressional Equality Caucus
- New Democrat Coalition
- Congressional Hispanic Caucus
- Congressional Doctors Caucus (co-chair)
- Indian Health Service Task Force (chair)

== Awards ==
He received in 2025 a Carnegie Corporation of New York Great Immigrant Award

== Personal life ==
Ruiz is married to Monica Rivers, an emergency room nurse. They married in 2014 in the Coachella Valley. Their twin daughters were born in 2015. He is a member of the Seventh-day Adventist Church. Ruiz and his family live in Indio.

== Electoral history ==
US House election, 2012: California District 36
Primary election
| Party | Candidate | Votes | % |
|---|---|---|---|
| Republican | Mary Bono Mack (incumbent) | 52,474 | 58.10 |
| Democratic | Raul Ruiz | 37,847 | 41.90 |
| Total votes | | 90,321 | 100 |
General election
| Democratic | Raul Ruiz | 110,189 | 52.94 |
| Republican | Mary Bono Mack (incumbent) | 97,953 | 47.06 |
| Total votes | | 208,142 | 100 |
| Democratic gain from Republican | | | |

US House election, 2014: California District 36
Primary election
| Party | Candidate | Votes | % |
|---|---|---|---|
| Democratic | Raul Ruiz (incumbent) | 41,443 | 50.33 |
| Republican | Brian Nestande | 28,662 | 34.81 |
| Republican | Ray Haynes | 12,232 | 14.86 |
| Total votes | | 82,337 | 100 |
General election
| Democratic | Raul Ruiz (incumbent) | 72,682 | 54.18 |
| Republican | Brian Nestande | 61,457 | 45.82 |
| Total votes | | 134,139 | 100 |
| Democratic hold | | | |

US House election, 2016: California District 36
Primary election
| Party | Candidate | Votes | % |
|---|---|---|---|
| Democratic | Raul Ruiz (incumbent) | 76,213 | 58.48 |
| Republican | Jeff Stone | 41,190 | 31.61 |
| Republican | Stephan Wolkowicz | 12,923 | 9.92 |
| Total votes | | 130,326 | 100 |
General election
| Democratic | Raul Ruiz (incumbent) | 144,348 | 62.05 |
| Republican | Jeff Stone | 88,269 | 37.95 |
| Total votes | | 232,617 | 100 |
| Democratic hold | | | |

US House election, 2018: California District 36
Primary election
| Party | Candidate | Votes | % |
|---|---|---|---|
| Democratic | Raul Ruiz (incumbent) | 65,554 | 59.20 |
| Republican | Kimberlin Brown Pelzer | 27,648 | 24.97 |
| Republican | Dan Ball | 9,312 | 8.41 |
| Republican | Douglas Hassett | 6,001 | 5.42 |
| Republican | Stephan Wolkowicz | 5,576 | 5.04 |
| Republican | Robert Bentley | 5,030 | 4.54 |
| Total votes | | 110,741 | 100 |
General election
| Democratic | Raul Ruiz (incumbent) | 122,169 | 59.02 |
| Republican | Kimberlin Brown Pelzer | 84,839 | 40.98 |
| Total votes | | 207,008 | 100 |
| Democratic hold | | | |

US House election, 2020: California District 36
Primary election
| Party | Candidate | Votes | % |
|---|---|---|---|
| Democratic | Raul Ruiz (incumbent) | 96,266 | 60.51 |
| Republican | Erin Cruz | 33,984 | 21.36 |
| Republican | Milo Stevanovich | 16,775 | 10.54 |
| Republican | Patrice Kimbler | 12,031 | 7.56 |
| Democratic | Gina Chapa | 45 | 0.03 |
| Total votes | | 159,101 | 100 |
General election
| Democratic | Raul Ruiz (incumbent) | 185,151 | 60.34 |
| Republican | Erin Cruz | 121,698 | 39.66 |
| Total votes | | 306,849 | 100 |
| Democratic hold | | | |

US House election, 2022: California District 25
Primary election
| Party | Candidate | Votes | % |
|---|---|---|---|
| Democratic | Raul Ruiz (incumbent) | 55,315 | 56.39 |
| Republican | Brian Hawkins | 16,085 | 16.40 |
| Republican | Brian Tyson | 14,186 | 14.46 |
| Republican | James Francis Gibson | 6,059 | 6.18 |
| Republican | Burt Thakur | 2,982 | 3.04 |
| Republican | Ceci Truman | 1,850 | 1.89 |
| Republican | Jonathan Reiss | 1,609 | 1.64 |
| Total votes | | 98,086 | 100 |
General election
| Democratic | Raul Ruiz (incumbent) | 87,641 | 57.38 |
| Republican | Brian Hawkins | 65,101 | 42.62 |
| Total votes | | 152,742 | 100 |
| Democratic hold | | | |

US House election, 2024: California District 25
Primary election
| Party | Candidate | Votes | % |
|---|---|---|---|
| Democratic | Raul Ruiz (incumbent) | 45,882 | 45.05 |
| Republican | Ian Weeks | 20,992 | 20.61 |
| Republican | Ceci Truman | 17,815 | 17.49 |
| Democratic | Oscar Ortiz | 10,171 | 9.99 |
| Republican | Miguel Chapa | 5,856 | 5.75 |
| Independent | Ryan Dean Burkett | 1,129 | 1.11 |
| Total votes | | 101,845 | 100 |
General election
| Democratic | Raul Ruiz (incumbent) | 137,837 | 56.25 |
| Republican | Ian Weeks | 107,194 | 43.75 |
| Total votes | | 245,031 | 100 |
| Democratic hold | | | |

US House election, 2026: California District 25
Primary election
| Party | Candidate | Votes | % |
|---|---|---|---|
| Democratic | Raul Ruiz (incumbent) | 88,699 | 60.01 |
| Republican | Joe Males | 27,927 | 18.89 |
| Republican | Ronald Huffman | 18,221 | 12.33 |
| Republican | Ceci Andrade Truman | 12,959 | 8.77 |
| Total votes | | 147,806 | 100 |

== See also ==
- List of Harvard University politicians
- List of Hispanic and Latino Americans in the United States Congress
- Physicians in US Congress

U.S. House of Representatives
| Preceded by Janice Hahn | Member of the U.S. House of Representatives from California's 36th congressional district 2013–2023 | Succeeded by Ted Lieu |
| Preceded by Mike Garcia | Member of the U.S. House of Representatives from California's 25th congressional district 2023–present | Incumbent |
| Preceded by Joaquin Castro | Chair of the Congressional Hispanic Caucus; 2021–2023 | Succeeded by Nanette Barragán |
U.S. order of precedence (ceremonial)
| Preceded by Mark Pocan | United States representatives by seniority 112th | Succeeded by Mark Takano |
