= United States House Committee on Energy and Commerce =

Standing committee of the United States House of Representatives

House Energy Committee
Standing committee
- Active United States House of Representatives; 119th Congress

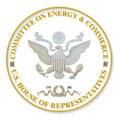
- U.S. House Committee on Energy and Commerce official seal

History
- Formed: December 14, 1795

Leadership
- Chair: Brett Guthrie (R); Since January 3, 2025
- Ranking Member: Frank Pallone (D); Since January 3, 2023

Structure
- Seats: 54 (54 currently filled) 30/30 24/24
- Political parties: Majority (30): Republican (30); Minority (24): Democratic (24)

Subcommittees
- Oversight and Investigations; Energy; Health; Communications and Technology; Commerce, Manufacturing, and Trade; Environment

Meeting place
- 2125, Rayburn House Office Building; Washington, D.C. 20515

Website
- energycommerce.house.gov (Republican) democrats-energycommerce.house.gov (Democratic)

Phone number
- (202)-225-3641

The Committee on Energy and Commerce is one of the oldest standing committees of the United States House of Representatives. Established in 1795, it has operated continuously—with various name changes and jurisdictional changes—for more than 200 years. The two other House standing committees with such continuous operation are the House Ways and Means Committee and the House Rules Committee. The committee has served as the principal guide for the House in matters relating to the promotion of commerce and to the public's health and marketplace interests, with the relatively recent addition of energy considerations among them. Due to its broad jurisdiction, it is considered one of the most powerful committees in the House.

== Role of the committee ==
The House Committee on Energy and Commerce has developed what is arguably the broadest (non-tax-oriented) jurisdiction of any congressional committee. The committee maintains principal responsibility for legislative oversight relating to telecommunications, consumer protection, food and drug safety, public health, air quality and environmental health, the supply and delivery of energy, and interstate and foreign commerce. This jurisdiction extends over five Cabinet-level departments and seven independent agencies—from the Department of Energy, Health and Human Services, the Transportation Department to the Federal Trade Commission, Food and Drug Administration, and Federal Communications Commission—and sundry quasi-governmental organizations.

== Jurisdiction ==
The Energy and Commerce Committee has the broadest jurisdiction of any authorizing committee in Congress. It legislates on a wide variety of issues, including:

- health care, including mental health and substance abuse
- health insurance, including Medicare and Medicaid
- biomedical research and development
- food, drug, device and cosmetic safety
- environmental protection
- clean air and climate change
- safe drinking water
- toxic chemicals and hazardous waste
- national energy policy
- renewable energy and conservation
- nuclear facilities
- electronic communications and the internet
- broadcast and cable television
- privacy, cybersecurity and data security
- consumer protection and product safety
- motor vehicle safety
- travel, tourism and sports
- interstate and foreign commerce

== Members, 119th Congress ==
Majority	Minority
Brett Guthrie, Kentucky, Chair; Bob Latta, Ohio; Morgan Griffith, Virginia; Gus Bilirakis, Florida; Richard Hudson, North Carolina; Buddy Carter, Georgia; Gary Palmer, Alabama; Neal Dunn, Florida, Vice Chair; Dan Crenshaw, Texas; John Joyce, Pennsylvania; Randy Weber, Texas; Rick Allen, Georgia; Troy Balderson, Ohio; Russ Fulcher, Idaho; August Pfluger, Texas; Diana Harshbarger, Tennessee; Mariannette Miller-Meeks, Iowa; Kat Cammack, Florida; Jay Obernolte, California; John James, Michigan; Cliff Bentz, Oregon; Erin Houchin, Indiana; Russell Fry, South Carolina; Laurel Lee, Florida; Nick Langworthy, New York; Thomas Kean Jr., New Jersey; Michael Rulli, Ohio; Gabe Evans, Colorado; Craig Goldman, Texas; Julie Fedorchak, North Dakota	Frank Pallone, New Jersey, Ranking Member; Diana DeGette, Colorado; Jan Schakowsky, Illinois; Doris Matsui, California; Kathy Castor, Florida; Paul Tonko, New York; Yvette Clarke, New York; Raul Ruiz, California; Scott Peters, California; Debbie Dingell, Michigan; Marc Veasey, Texas; Robin Kelly, Illinois; Nanette Barragán, California; Darren Soto, Florida; Kim Schrier, Washington; Lori Trahan, Massachusetts; Lizzie Fletcher, Texas, Vice Ranking Member; Alexandria Ocasio-Cortez, New York; Jake Auchincloss, Massachusetts; Troy Carter, Louisiana; Rob Menendez, New Jersey; Kevin Mullin, California; Greg Landsman, Ohio; Jennifer McClellan, Virginia

Resolutions electing members: H.Res. 13 (Chair), H.Res. 14 (Ranking Member), H.Res. 21 (R), H.Res. 22 (D), H.Res. 40 (Menendez)

== Subcommittees ==
To manage the wide variety of issues it encounters, the committee relies on the front-line work of six subcommittees, one more than during the 111th Congress. During the 111th Congress, Henry Waxman combined the traditionally separate energy and environment subcommittees into a single subcommittee. Fred Upton restored them as separate subcommittees at the start of the 112th Congress, and they have been retained to this day.

Subcommittee	Chair	Ranking Member
Communications and Technology	Richard Hudson (R-NC)	Doris Matsui (D-CA)
Energy	Bob Latta (R-OH)	Kathy Castor (D-FL)
Environment	Morgan Griffith (R-VA)	Paul Tonko (D-NY)
Health	Buddy Carter (R-GA)	Diana DeGette (D-CO)
Commerce, Manufacturing, and Trade	Gus Bilirakis (R-FL)	Jan Schakowsky (D-IL)
Oversight and Investigations	Gary Palmer (R-AL)	Yvette Clarke (D-NY)

== Historical membership rosters ==
=== 118th Congress ===
Majority	Minority
Cathy McMorris Rodgers, Washington, Chair; Michael C. Burgess, Texas; Bob Latta, Ohio; Brett Guthrie, Kentucky; Morgan Griffith, Virginia; Gus Bilirakis, Florida; Bill Johnson, Ohio (until January 21, 2024); Larry Bucshon, Indiana; Richard Hudson, North Carolina; Tim Walberg, Michigan; Buddy Carter, Georgia; Jeff Duncan, South Carolina; Gary Palmer, Alabama; Neal Dunn, Florida; John Curtis, Utah; Debbie Lesko, Arizona; Greg Pence, Indiana; Dan Crenshaw, Texas; John Joyce, Pennsylvania; Kelly Armstrong, North Dakota, Vice Chair; Randy Weber, Texas; Rick Allen, Georgia; Troy Balderson, Ohio; Russ Fulcher, Idaho; August Pfluger, Texas; Diana Harshbarger, Tennessee; Mariannette Miller-Meeks, Iowa; Kat Cammack, Florida; Jay Obernolte, California; John James, Michigan	Frank Pallone, New Jersey, Ranking Member; Anna Eshoo, California; Diana DeGette, Colorado; Jan Schakowsky, Illinois; Doris Matsui, California; Kathy Castor, Florida; John Sarbanes, Maryland; Paul Tonko, New York; Yvette Clarke, New York; Tony Cárdenas, California; Raul Ruiz, California; Scott Peters, California; Debbie Dingell, Michigan; Marc Veasey, Texas; Annie Kuster, New Hampshire; Robin Kelly, Illinois; Nanette Barragán, California; Lisa Blunt Rochester, Delaware; Darren Soto, Florida; Angie Craig, Minnesota; Kim Schrier, Washington, Vice Ranking Member; Lori Trahan, Massachusetts; Lizzie Fletcher, Texas

Resolutions electing members: H.Res. 14 (Chair), H.Res. 15 (Ranking Member), H.Res. 56 (R), H.Res. 57 (D), H.Res. 1133 (R)

Subcommittees

Subcommittee	Chair	Ranking Member
Communications and Technology	Bob Latta (R-OH)	Doris Matsui (D-CA)
Energy, Climate and Grid Security	Jeff Duncan (R-SC)	Diana DeGette (D-CO)
Environment, Manufacturing and Critical Minerals	Bill Johnson (R-OH)	Paul Tonko (D-NY)
Health	Brett Guthrie (R-KY)	Anna G. Eshoo (D-CA)
Innovation, Data and Commerce	Gus Bilirakis (R-FL)	Jan Schakowsky (D-IL)
Oversight and Investigations	Morgan Griffith (R-VA)	Kathy Castor (D-FL)

=== 117th Congress ===
Majority	Minority
Frank Pallone, New Jersey, Chair; Bobby Rush, Illinois; Anna Eshoo, California; Diana DeGette, Colorado; Mike Doyle, Pennsylvania; Jan Schakowsky, Illinois; G. K. Butterfield, North Carolina; Doris Matsui, California; Kathy Castor, Florida; John Sarbanes, Maryland; Jerry McNerney, California; Peter Welch, Vermont; Paul Tonko, New York; Yvette Clarke, New York; Kurt Schrader, Oregon; Tony Cárdenas, California; Raul Ruiz, California; Scott Peters, California; Debbie Dingell, Michigan; Marc Veasey, Texas; Ann McLane Kuster, New Hampshire; Robin Kelly, Illinois, Vice Chair; Nanette Barragán, California; Donald McEachin, Virginia (until November 28, 2022); Lisa Blunt Rochester, Delaware; Darren Soto, Florida; Tom O'Halleran, Arizona; Kathleen Rice, New York; Angie Craig, Minnesota; Kim Schrier, Washington; Lori Trahan, Massachusetts; Lizzie Fletcher, Texas	Cathy McMorris Rodgers, Washington, Ranking Member; Fred Upton, Michigan; Michael C. Burgess, Texas; Steve Scalise, Louisiana; Bob Latta, Ohio; Brett Guthrie, Kentucky; David McKinley, West Virginia; Adam Kinzinger, Illinois; Morgan Griffith, Virginia; Gus Bilirakis, Florida; Bill Johnson, Ohio; Billy Long, Missouri; Larry Bucshon, Indiana; Markwayne Mullin, Oklahoma; Richard Hudson, North Carolina; Tim Walberg, Michigan; Buddy Carter, Georgia; Jeff Duncan, South Carolina; Gary Palmer, Alabama; Neal Dunn, Florida; John Curtis, Utah; Debbie Lesko, Arizona; Greg Pence, Indiana; Dan Crenshaw, Texas; John Joyce, Pennsylvania; Kelly Armstrong, North Dakota

Resolutions electing members: H.Res. 9 (Chair), H.Res. 10 (Ranking Member), H.Res. 62 (D), H.Res. 63 (R)

Subcommittees

Subcommittee	Chair	Ranking Member
Communications and Technology	Mike Doyle (D-PA)	Bob Latta (R-OH)
Consumer Protection and Commerce	Jan Schakowsky (D-IL)	Gus Bilirakis (R-FL)
Energy	Bobby Rush (D-IL)	Fred Upton (R-MI)
Environment and Climate Change	Paul Tonko (D-NY)	David McKinley (R-WV)
Health	Anna G. Eshoo (D-CA)	Brett Guthrie (R-KY)
Oversight and Investigations	Diana DeGette (D-CO)	Morgan Griffith (R-VA)

=== 116th Congress ===
Majority	Minority
Frank Pallone, New Jersey, Chair; Bobby Rush, Illinois; Anna Eshoo, California; Eliot Engel, New York; Diana DeGette, Colorado; Mike Doyle, Pennsylvania; Jan Schakowsky, Illinois; G. K. Butterfield, North Carolina; Doris Matsui, California; Kathy Castor, Florida; John Sarbanes, Maryland; Jerry McNerney, California; Peter Welch, Vermont; Ben Ray Luján, New Mexico; Paul Tonko, New York; Yvette Clarke, New York, Vice Chair; Dave Loebsack, Iowa; Kurt Schrader, Oregon; Joe Kennedy III, Massachusetts; Tony Cárdenas, California; Raul Ruiz, California; Scott Peters, California; Debbie Dingell, Michigan; Marc Veasey, Texas; Ann McLane Kuster, New Hampshire; Robin Kelly, Illinois; Nanette Barragán, California; Donald McEachin, Virginia; Lisa Blunt Rochester, Delaware; Darren Soto, Florida; Tom O'Halleran, Arizona	Greg Walden, Oregon, Ranking Member; Fred Upton, Michigan; John Shimkus, Illinois; Michael C. Burgess, Texas; Steve Scalise, Louisiana; Bob Latta, Ohio; Cathy McMorris Rodgers, Washington; Brett Guthrie, Kentucky; Pete Olson, Texas; David McKinley, West Virginia; Adam Kinzinger, Illinois; Morgan Griffith, Virginia; Gus Bilirakis, Florida; Bill Johnson, Ohio; Billy Long, Missouri; Larry Bucshon, Indiana; Bill Flores, Texas; Susan Brooks, Indiana; Markwayne Mullin, Oklahoma; Richard Hudson, North Carolina; Tim Walberg, Michigan; Buddy Carter, Georgia; Jeff Duncan, South Carolina; Greg Gianforte, Montana

Sources: H.Res. 7 (Chair), H.Res. 8 (Ranking Member), H.Res. 42 (D), H.Res. 68 (R)

Subcommittees

Subcommittee	Chair	Ranking Member
Communications and Technology	Mike Doyle (D-PA)	Bob Latta (R-OH)
Consumer Protection and Commerce	Jan Schakowsky (D-IL)	Gus Bilirakis (R-FL)
Energy	Bobby Rush (D-IL)	Fred Upton (R-MI)
Environment and Climate Change	Paul Tonko (D-NY)	David McKinley (R-WV)
Health	Anna Eshoo (D-CA)	Brett Guthrie (R-KY)
Oversight and Investigations	Diana DeGette (D-CO)	Morgan Griffith (R-VA)

=== 115th Congress ===
Majority	Minority
Greg Walden, Oregon, Chair; Joe Barton, Texas, Vice Chair; Fred Upton, Michigan; John Shimkus, Illinois; Michael C. Burgess, Texas; Marsha Blackburn, Tennessee; Steve Scalise, Louisiana; Bob Latta, Ohio; Cathy McMorris Rodgers, Washington; Gregg Harper, Mississippi; Leonard Lance, New Jersey; Brett Guthrie, Kentucky; Pete Olson, Texas; David McKinley, West Virginia; Adam Kinzinger, Illinois; Morgan Griffith, Virginia; Gus Bilirakis, Florida; Bill Johnson, Ohio; Billy Long, Missouri; Larry Bucshon, Indiana; Bill Flores, Texas; Susan Brooks, Indiana; Markwayne Mullin, Oklahoma; Richard Hudson, North Carolina; Kevin Cramer, North Dakota; Tim Walberg, Michigan; Mimi Walters, California; Ryan Costello, Pennsylvania; Buddy Carter, Georgia; Chris Collins, New York (removed August 8, 2018)	Frank Pallone, New Jersey, Ranking Member; Bobby Rush, Illinois; Anna Eshoo, California; Eliot Engel, New York; Gene Green, Texas; Diana DeGette, Colorado; Mike Doyle, Pennsylvania; Jan Schakowsky, Illinois; G. K. Butterfield, North Carolina; Doris Matsui, California; Kathy Castor, Florida, Vice Ranking Member; John Sarbanes, Maryland; Jerry McNerney, California; Peter Welch, Vermont; Ben Ray Luján, New Mexico; Paul Tonko, New York; Yvette Clarke, New York; Dave Loebsack, Iowa; Kurt Schrader, Oregon; Joe Kennedy III, Massachusetts; Tony Cárdenas, California; Raul Ruiz, California; Scott Peters, California; Debbie Dingell, Michigan

Sources: H.Res. 6 (Chair), H.Res. 7 (Ranking Member), H.Res. 29 (R) and H.Res. 45 (D).

=== 114th Congress ===
Majority	Minority
Fred Upton, Michigan, Chair; Joe Barton, Texas; Marsha Blackburn, Tennessee, Vice Chair; James Comer, Kentucky; John Shimkus, Illinois; Joseph Pitts, Pennsylvania; Greg Walden, Oregon; Tim Murphy, Pennsylvania; Michael C. Burgess, Texas; Steve Scalise, Louisiana; Bob Latta, Ohio; Cathy McMorris Rodgers, Washington; Gregg Harper, Mississippi; Leonard Lance, New Jersey; Brett Guthrie, Kentucky; Pete Olson, Texas; David McKinley, West Virginia; Mike Pompeo, Kansas; Adam Kinzinger, Illinois; Morgan Griffith, Virginia; Gus Bilirakis, Florida; Bill Johnson, Ohio; Renee Ellmers, North Carolina; Larry Bucshon, Indiana; Bill Flores, Texas; Susan Brooks, Indiana; Markwayne Mullin, Oklahoma; Richard Hudson, North Carolina; Chris Collins, New York; Kevin Cramer, North Dakota	Frank Pallone, New Jersey, Ranking Member; Bobby Rush, Illinois; Anna Eshoo, California; Eliot Engel, New York; Gene Green, Texas; Diana DeGette, Colorado; Lois Capps, California; Mike Doyle, Pennsylvania; Jan Schakowsky, Illinois; G. K. Butterfield, North Carolina; Doris Matsui, California; Kathy Castor, Florida; John Sarbanes, Maryland; Jerry McNerney, California; Peter Welch, Vermont; Ben Ray Luján, New Mexico; Paul Tonko, New York; Yvette Clarke, New York; Dave Loebsack, Iowa; Kurt Schrader, Oregon; Joe Kennedy III, Massachusetts; Tony Cárdenas, California

== History ==
The committee was originally formed as the Committee on Commerce and Manufactures on December 14, 1795. Prior to this, legislation was drafted in the Committee of the Whole or in special ad hoc committees, appointed for specific limited purposes. However the growing demands of the new nation required that Congress establish a permanent committee to manage its constitutional authority under the Commerce Clause to "regulate Commerce with foreign Nations, and among the several States."

From this time forward, as the nation grew and Congress dealt with new public policy concerns and created new committees, the Energy and Commerce Committee has maintained its central position as Congress's monitor of commercial progress—a focus reflected in its changing jurisdiction, both in name and practice.

In 1819, the committee's name was changed to the Committee on Commerce, reflecting the creation of a separate Manufacturers Committee and also the increasing scope of and complexity of American commercial activity, which was expanding the committee's jurisdiction from navigational aids and the nascent general health service to foreign trade and tariffs. Thomas J. Bliley, who chaired the committee from 1995 to 2000, chose to use this traditional name, which underscores the committee's role for Congress on this front.

In 1891, in emphasis of the committee's evolving activities, the name was again changed to the Committee on Interstate and Foreign Commerce—a title it maintained until 1981, when, under incoming Chair John Dingell, the committee first assumed what is now its present name to emphasize its lead role in guiding the energy policy of the United States. Dingell regained leading of the committee in 2007 after having served as ranking member since 1995. In late 2008, Henry Waxman initiated a successful challenge to unseat Dingell as chair. His challenge was unusual as the party caucus traditionally elects chairs based on committee seniority. Waxman formally became chair at the start of the 111th Congress.

== Leadership ==
A list of former chairs is below.

=== Committee on Commerce and Manufactures (1795–1819) ===
Chairs
Name	Party	State	Start	End
Benjamin Goodhue	Federalist	Massachusetts	1795	1796
John Swanwick	Democratic-Republican	Pennsylvania	1796	1797
Edward Livingston	Democratic-Republican	New York	1797	1798
Samuel Smith	Democratic-Republican	Maryland	1798	1803
Samuel Mitchill	Democratic-Republican	New York	1803	1805
Jacob Crowninshield	Democratic-Republican	Massachusetts	1805	1806
Gurdon Mumford	Democratic-Republican	New York	1806	1807
Thomas Newton	Democratic-Republican	Virginia	1807	1819

=== Committee on Commerce (1819–1891) ===
Chairs
Name	Party	State	Start	End
Thomas Newton	Democratic-Republican	Virginia	1819	1827
Churchill Cambreleng	Democratic	New York	1827	1833
Joel Sutherland	Democratic	Pennsylvania	1833	1837
Francis Smith	Democratic	Maine	1837	1838
Samuel Cushman	Democratic	New Hampshire	1838	1839
Edward Curtis	Whig	New York	1839	1841
John Kennedy	Whig	Maryland	1841	1843
Isaac Holmes	Democratic	South Carolina	1843	1845
Robert McClelland	Democratic	Michigan	1845	1847
Washington Hunt	Whig	New York	1847	1849
Robert McLane	Democratic	Maryland	1849	1851
David Seymour	Democratic	New York	1851	1853
Thomas Fuller	Democratic	Maine	1853	1855
Elihu Washburne	Republican	Illinois	1855	1857
John Cochrane	Democratic	New York	1857	1859
Elihu Washburne	Republican	Illinois	1859	1868
Thomas Eliot	Republican	Massachusetts	1868	1869
Nathan Dixon	Republican	Rhode Island	1869	1871
Samuel Shellabarger	Republican	Ohio	1871	1873
William Wheeler	Republican	New York	1873	1875
Frank Hereford	Democratic	West Virginia	1875	1877
Elijah Ward	Democratic	New York	1877	
John Reagan	Democratic	Texas	1877	1881
Horace Page	Republican	California	1881	1883
John Reagan	Democratic	Texas	1883	1887
Martin Clardy	Democratic	Missouri	1887	1889
Charles Baker	Republican	New York	1889	1891

=== Committee on Interstate and Foreign Commerce (1891–1981) ===
Chairs
Name	Party	State	Start	End
Roger Mills	Democratic	Texas	1891	1892
George Wise	Democratic	Virginia	1892	1895
William Hepburn	Republican	Iowa	1895	1909
James Mann	Republican	Illinois	1909	1911
William Adamson	Democratic	Georgia	1911	1917
Thetus Sims	Democratic	Tennessee	1917	1919
John Esch	Republican	Wisconsin	1919	1921
Samuel Winslow	Republican	Massachusetts	1921	1925
James Parker	Republican	New York	1925	1931
Sam Rayburn	Democratic	Texas	1931	1937
Clarence Lea	Democratic	California	1937	1947
Charles Wolverton	Republican	New Jersey	1947	1949
Robert Crosser	Democratic	Ohio	1949	1953
Charles Wolverton	Republican	New Jersey	1953	1955
Percy Priest	Democratic	Tennessee	1955	1956
Oren Harris	Democratic	Arkansas	1957	1966
Harley Staggers	Democratic	West Virginia	1966	1981

Ranking members
Name	Party	State	Start	End
Clarence Lea	Democratic	California	1947	1949
Charles Wolverton	Republican	New Jersey	1949	1953
Robert Crosser	Democratic	Ohio	1953	1955
Charles Wolverton	Republican	New Jersey	1955	1959
John Bennett	Republican	Michigan	1959	1964
William Springer	Republican	Illinois	1964	1973
Samuel Devine	Republican	Ohio	1973	1981

=== Committee on Energy and Commerce (1981–present) ===
Chairs
Name	Party	State	Start	End
John Dingell	Democratic	Michigan	1981	1995
Thomas Bliley	Republican	Virginia	1995	2001
Billy Tauzin	Republican	Louisiana	2001	2004
Joe Barton	Republican	Texas	2004	2007
John Dingell	Democratic	Michigan	2007	2009
Henry Waxman	Democratic	California	2009	2011
Fred Upton	Republican	Michigan	2011	2017
Greg Walden	Republican	Oregon	2017	2019
Frank Pallone	Democratic	New Jersey	2019	2023
Cathy McMorris Rodgers	Republican	Washington	2023	2025
Brett Guthrie	Republican	Kentucky	2025	present

Ranking members
Name	Party	State	Start	End
Jim Broyhill	Republican	North Carolina	1981	1986
Norman Lent	Republican	New York	1986	1993
Carlos Moorhead	Republican	California	1993	1995
John Dingell	Democratic	Michigan	1995	2007
Joe Barton	Republican	Texas	2007	2011
Henry Waxman	Democratic	California	2011	2015
Frank Pallone	Democratic	New Jersey	2015	2019
Greg Walden	Republican	Oregon	2019	2021
Cathy McMorris Rodgers	Republican	Washington	2021	2023
Frank Pallone	Democratic	New Jersey	2023	present

== See also ==
- List of United States House of Representatives committees
