= Jerry McNerney =

American politician (born 1951)

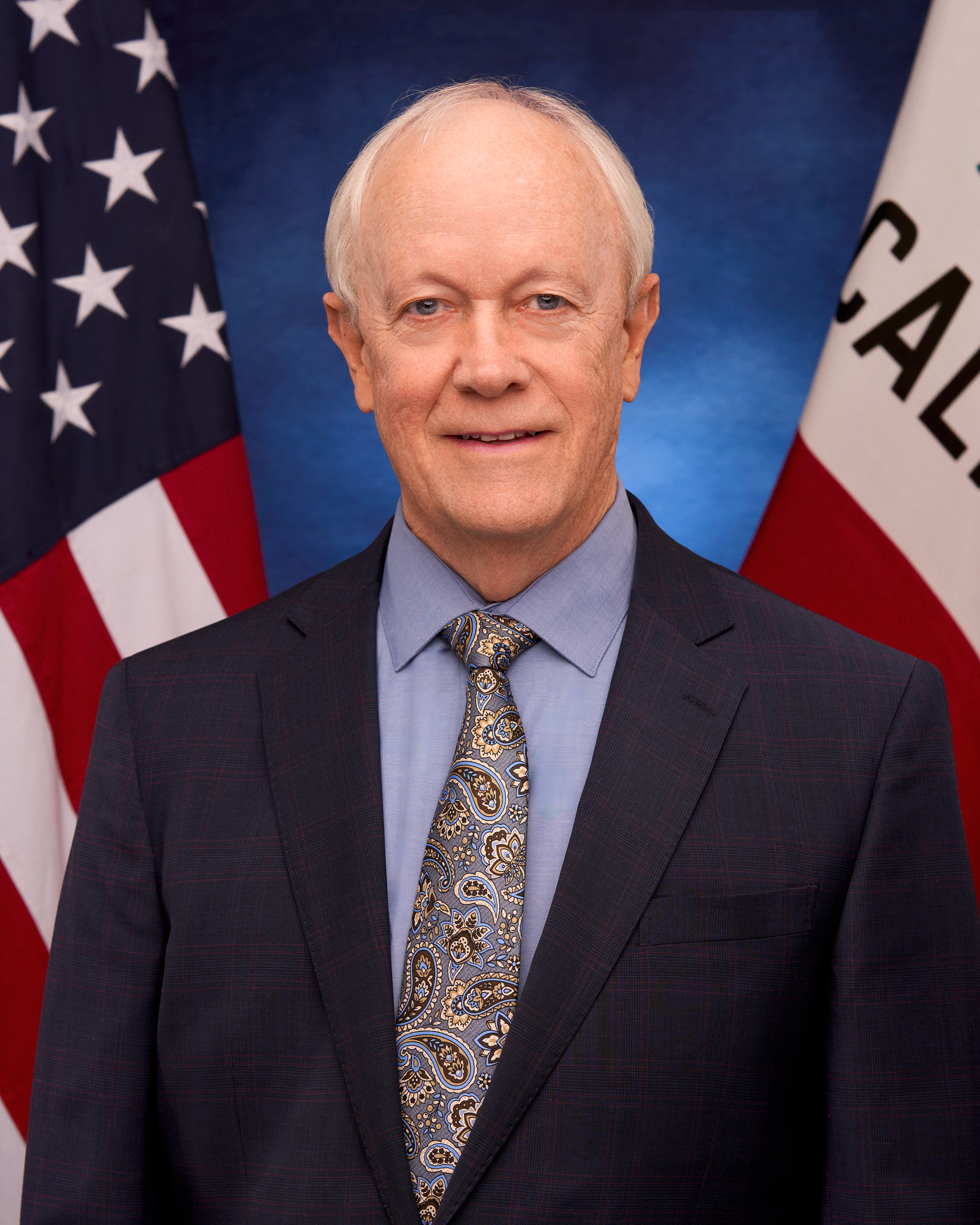
- Official portrait, 2024

Member of the California State Senate from the 5th district
- Incumbent
- Assumed office December 2, 2024
- Preceded by: Susan Eggman

Member of the U.S. House of Representatives from California
- In office January 3, 2007 – January 3, 2023
- Preceded by: Richard Pombo
- Succeeded by: Josh Harder
- Constituency: 11th district (2007–2013); 9th district (2013–2023)

Personal details
- Born: June 18, 1951 (age 75) Albuquerque, New Mexico, U.S.
- Party: Democratic
- Spouse: Mary Martine (m. 1977)
- Children: 3
- Education: United States Military Academy; University of New Mexico (BS, MS, PhD)
- Scientific career
- Fields: Mathematics
- Thesis: A (1,1) Tensor Generalization of the Laplace-Beltrami Operator (1981)
- Doctoral advisor: Alexander Stone
- McNerney's voice McNerney on how the 2013 government shutdown will impact California's National Energy Laboratories. Recorded October 11, 2013

Gerald Mark McNerney (/məkˈnɜːrni/ mək-NUR-nee; born June 18, 1951) is an American businessman and politician who has served as member of the California State Senate from the 5th district since 2024. A member of the Democratic Party, his district includes all of San Joaquin County and the Tri-Valley area of Alameda County. He previously served as the U.S. representative from California's 9th congressional district, based in Stockton, from 2007 until 2023.

== Early life, education, and business career ==
McNerney was born in Albuquerque, New Mexico, the son of Rosemary (née Tischhauser) and John E. McNerney. He is of Swiss and Irish descent. He attended St. Joseph's Military Academy in Hays, Kansas, and, for two years, the United States Military Academy at West Point. After leaving West Point in 1971 in protest of U.S. involvement in the Vietnam War, he enrolled at the University of New Mexico in Albuquerque, where he received bachelor's and master's degrees and, in 1981, a Ph.D. in mathematics, with a doctoral dissertation in differential geometry focusing on a generalization of the Laplace–Beltrami operator.

McNerney served several years as a contractor to Sandia National Laboratories at Kirtland Air Force Base on national security programs. In 1985, he accepted a senior engineering position with U.S. Windpower (Kenetech). In 1994, he began working as an energy consultant for PG&E, FloWind, The Electric Power Research Institute, and other utility companies. Before being elected to Congress, McNerney served as the CEO of a start-up company manufacturing wind turbines, HAWT Power (Horizontal Axis Wind Turbine Power).

== U.S. House of Representatives ==
=== Elections ===
==== 2004 ====
McNerney first ran for Congress against Richard Pombo in California's 11th congressional district in the 2004 House elections. He entered the race two weeks before the primary election as a write-in candidate, encouraged by his son. He qualified as a write-in candidate for the March primary by a small margin. With no opponent, he won the primary and qualified for the November general election ballot as the Democratic nominee. He lost the general election, 61%–39%.

==== 2006 ====
McNerney launched his 2006 campaign early in the fall of 2005. In June 2006 he won the Democratic primary with 52.8% of the vote, defeating Steve Filson, who had been endorsed by the DCCC, and Stevan Thomas.

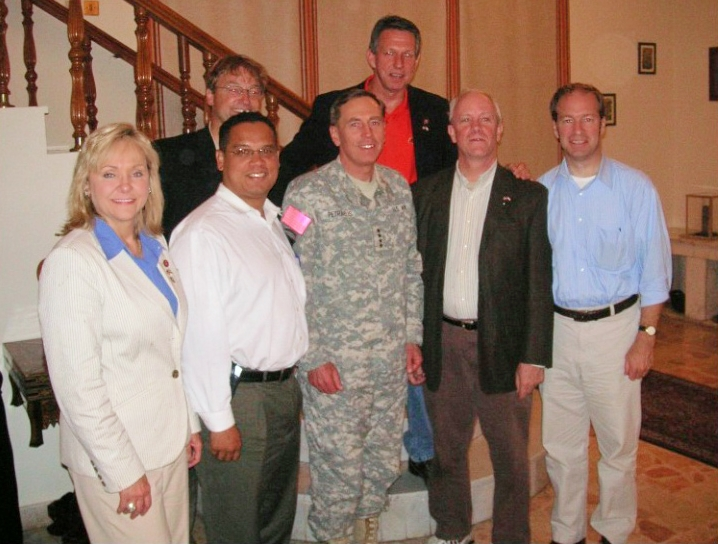
Jerry McNerney meeting with Commander of Multi-National Force – Iraq General David Petraeus in 2007.

In late July, Republicans Pete McCloskey and Tom Benigno, both of whom ran in the Republican primary against Pombo, endorsed McNerney. In September, analysis of the campaign was changed from "Republican safe" to "Republican favored" due to the emergence of McNerney's campaign. The report noted "a [GOP] party spokesman says it's because they want to win decisively but others speculate that internal polling has delivered bad news for the incumbent." On October 3, a poll commissioned by Defenders of Wildlife Action Fund was released with McNerney leading Pombo, 48% to 46%. Based on these events, in early October, CQPolitics.com changed their rating of this race from Republican Favored to Leans Republican.

On November 7, 2006, McNerney defeated Pombo, 53–47%.

==== 2008 ====
McNerney was reelected, 55% to 45%, over Republican Lincoln Unified School Board Trustee Dean Andal.

==== 2010 ====
McNerney was reelected, 48%–47%, defeating Republican nominee David Harmer.

==== 2012 ====
For his first three terms, McNerney represented a district that encompassed eastern Contra Costa County, most of San Joaquin County outside of Stockton, parts of Alameda County, and a small portion of Santa Clara County. After redistricting, his district was renumbered as the 9th district. It lost its portion of Contra Costa County, including McNerney's home in Pleasanton, while picking up all of Stockton along with part of Sacramento County. After the new map was announced, McNerney announced he would move to Stockton in the new 9th. While the old 11th was a hybrid Bay Area/Central Valley district, the new 9th was more of a Central Valley district, slightly more Democratic than its predecessor. McNerney eventually bought a home in Stockton. He was reelected, 56%–44%, defeating Republican nominee Ricky Gill.

=== Tenure ===
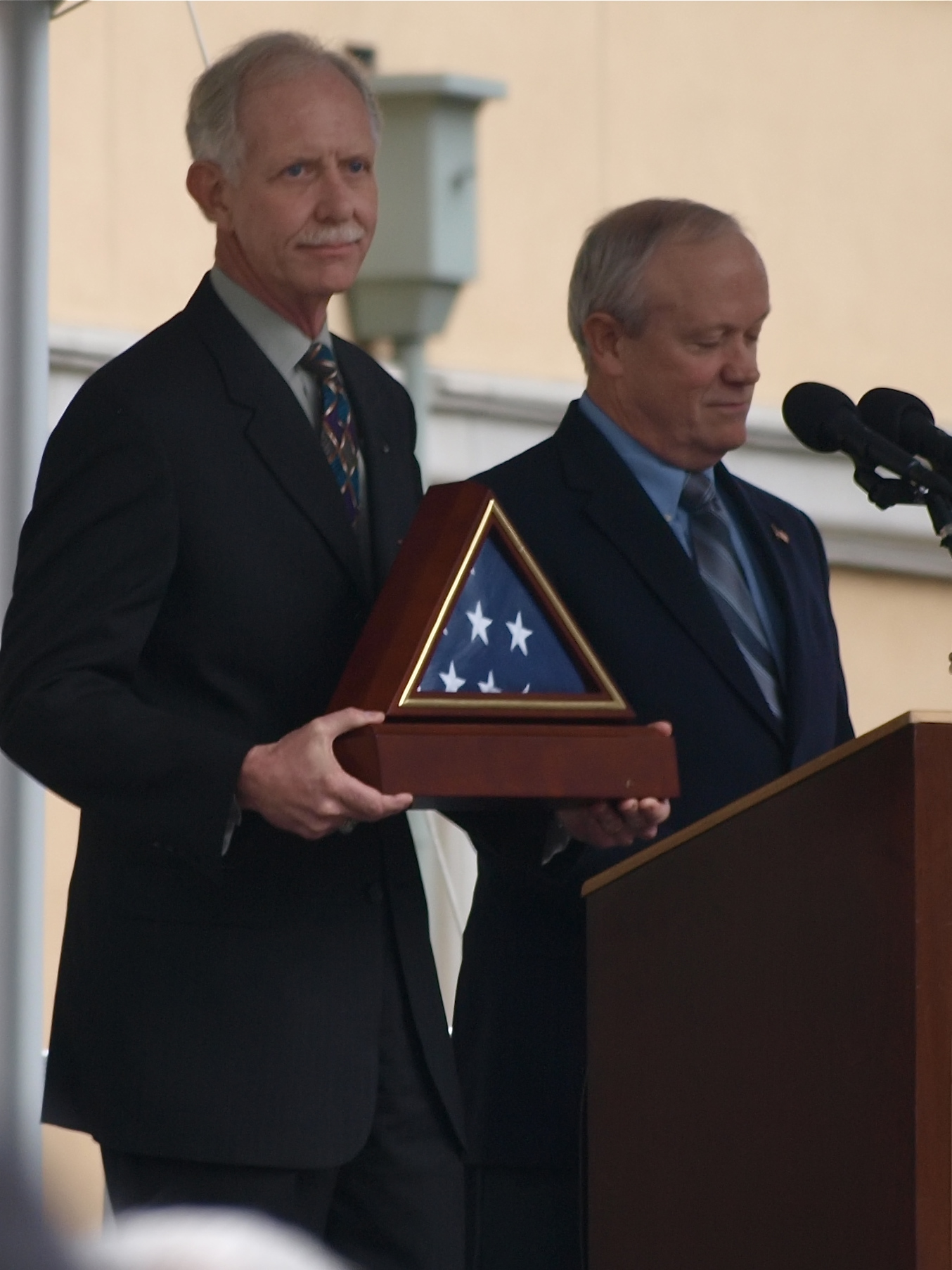
McNerney presenting Chesley Sullenberger with a framed flag, as part of a January 24, 2009, celebration honoring the pilot in his hometown of Danville, California.

In 2010, President Barack Obama signed into law a bill McNerney wrote that establishes an evaluation panel to assess the Veteran's Administration treatments for traumatic brain injury. McNerney wrote a bill in 2013 that allowed veterans to keep receiving their benefits during the government shutdown.

McNerney was one of the first lawmakers to call for the resignation of VA Secretary Eric Shinseki after revelations about delays in care at VA health care facilities.

McNerney is a proponent of renewable energy and supports cap and trade.

McNerney co-sponsored the bill To require the Secretary of Energy to prepare a report on the impact of thermal insulation on both energy and water use for potable hot water (H.R. 4801; 113th Congress), which would require the United States Secretary of Energy to prepare a report on the effects of thermal insulation on both energy consumption and systems for providing potable water in federal buildings.

In 2007, McNerney voted against legislation that would have prevented the DEA from enforcing prohibition in the 12 states (including California) that allow the use of marijuana for medical purposes.

In 2013, McNerney introduced the Methamphetamine Education, Treatment and Hope (METH) Act to expand programs that combat methamphetamine abuse.

In April 2018, McNerney, Jared Huffman, Jamie Raskin, and Dan Kildee launched the Congressional Freethought Caucus. Its stated goals include "pushing public policy formed on the basis of reason, science, and moral values", promoting the "separation of church and state", and opposing discrimination against "atheists, agnostics, humanists, seekers, religious and nonreligious persons", among others. Huffman and Raskin act as co-chairs.

In 2019, McNerney authored the AI in Government Act (HR 2575). Enacted in 2020, the AI in Government Act was designed to facilitate the adoption of artificial intelligence (AI) technologies within the federal government, improve competency in their use, and ensure that AI applications are trustworthy and benefit the public.

McNerney voted with President Joe Biden's stated position 100% of the time in the 117th Congress, according to a FiveThirtyEight analysis.

=== Committee assignments ===
- Committee on Energy and Commerce
  - Subcommittee on Energy and Power
  - Subcommittee on Commerce, Manufacturing and Trade
  - Subcommittee on Environment and Economy
- Committee on Science, Space, and Technology
  - Subcommittee on Energy
- Committee on Veterans Affairs

=== Caucus memberships ===
- Chair, Artificial Intelligence Caucus
- Chair, Grid Innovation Caucus
- Chair, Wi-Fi Caucus
- Congressional Arthritis Caucus
- United States Congressional International Conservation Caucus
- Grid Innovation Caucus
- Congressional Freethought Caucus
- Congressional Asian Pacific American Caucus
- Climate Solutions Caucus
- Medicare for All Caucus

== California State Senate ==
On December 8, 2023, McNerney filed for an open seat in District 5 of the California State Senate, upending a move into the race by Assemblymember Carlos Villapudua. McNerney defeated Republican Jim Shoemaker in the general election. He assumed office on December 2, 2024.

=== 2025 Legislation ===
- SB 31 Expanding the Use of Recycled Water. Signed into law on Oct. 13, 2025, SB 31 helps drought-proof California by boosting the use of recycled water. It also protects the state’s fresh water supply by allowing businesses, homes, and agencies to expand their use of recycled water for irrigation and other uses, rather than relying on drinking water.
- SB 86 Green Energy Manufacturing Jobs. Signed into law on Oct. 1, 2025, SB 86 creates clean manufacturing energy jobs in California by extending a key program that provides tax incentives to California green energy manufacturers. The law also adds fusion energy to the tax incentive program.
- SB 279 Helping Farmers & Winegrape Growers. Signed into on Oct. 11, 2025, SB 279 reduces costs for California farmers and winegrape growers by allowing them to compost large amounts of green waste onsite during a biomass event, such as the removal of an orchard or vineyard. The bill also allows community composting programs, urban farms, and school farms to compost larger amounts of green waste onsite.
- SB 543 Low-Cost Housing. Signed into law on Oct. 10, 2025, SB 543 helps address California’s housing affordability crisis by streamlining the construction of low-cost housing known as accessory dwelling units (ADUs), also called backyard cottages or in-law units, and junior accessory dwelling units (JADUs), such as an attached garage converted into living space.
- SB 711 Making Tax Filing Easier. Signed into law on Oct. 1, 2025, SB 711 makes it easier for California taxpayers – especially taxpayers with small businesses – to file their taxes by aligning numerous state tax requirements with federal requirements for the first time in a decade.
- SB 846 Protecting Farmworkers’ Wages. Signed into law on July 14, 2025, SB 846 protects farmworkers from wage theft by updating state law that holds agricultural employers accountable.
- SB 237 Stabilizing Gas Prices (with Sens. Grayson, Hurtado, and Richardson, and Asm. Wilson). Signed into law on Sept. 19, 2025, SB 237 is groundbreaking legislation that is designed to stabilize gasoline prices as the state transitions away from fossil fuels.

McNerney also introduced legislation known as the No Robo Bosses Act (SB 7) that sought to regulate artificial intelligence (AI) technologies in workplace settings. The bill would require human oversight of automated decision-making systems in California workplaces. Gov. Gavin Newsom vetoed SB 7 on Oct. 13, 2025. In 2026, McNerney reintroduced SB 7 as SB 947, the No Robo Bosses Act of 2026. McNerney refined the legislation to address the governor's concerns, and the governor signed SB 947 into law on Sept. 30, 2026.

=== 2026 Legislation ===
- SB 327 Protecting Ratepayers. Signed into law on Sept. 27, 2016, SB 327 protects ratepayers by strengthening oversight of investor-owned utilities (IOUs) and barring IOUs from using ratepayer funds to fight efforts to create municipal utilities.
- SB 813 Assessing Artificial Intelligence Safety Risks. Signed into law on Sept. 9, 2016, SB 813 establishes a first-in-the-nation framework for independent third-party assessments of the potential safety risks posed by artificial intelligence (AI) systems.
- SB 881 Helping Farmers Fight Hunger. Signed into law on Sept. 27, 2026, SB 881 enables farmers, growers, and food producers to continue to provide fresh fruits, vegetables, nuts, and more to food-insecure families and receive tax credits for donating surplus food to food banks.
- SB 900 Campaign Finance Disclosure Reform. Signed into law on Sept. 27, 2026, SB 900 updates California’s campaign disclosure rules to provide more transparency and clarity regarding who is paying for political advertisements.
- SB 925 California Fusion Energy Roadmap. Signed into law on Sept. 29, 2026, SB 925 directs the California Energy Commission to develop a strategic plan to advance fusion energy, which has the potential to provide nearly limitless clean, safe, and reliable power.
- SB 947 No Robo Bosses Act of 2026. Signed into law on Sept. 30, 2026, SB 947 requires human oversight of artificial intelligence systems in the workplace to prevent AI from firing or disciplining workers on its own. It is the first such law in the nation.
- SB 1058 Local Meals for Kids. Signed into law on July 13, 2026, SB 1058 updates California law to allow school districts to provide more high-quality, locally grown and culturally appropriate foods for students.
- SB 1168 Data Centers Pay Their Fair Share. Signed into law on Sept. 21, 2026, SB 1168 directs the California Public Utilities Commission (CPUC) to examine data centers’ use of excessive amounts of energy and ensure that Californians don’t face rate hikes as a result.
- SB 1196 Accelerating ADU Utility Hookups. Signed into law on Sept. 27, 2026, SB 1196 directs the CPUC to establish clear timelines for processing utility hookups requests for accessory dwelling units (ADUs) and other small energization projects and institute penalties for utilities that violate the new standards.
- SB 1350 Expanding Green Hydrogen. Signed into law on June 29, 2026 SB 1350 expands California's clean energy program by including the use of green hydrogen, a promising form of renewable energy, to generate electricity. It is the first such law in the nation.
- SB 1406 Closing the Montana Tax Loophole. Signed into law on Sept. 30, 2026, SB 1406 cracks down on tax scams in which wealthy Californians create phony shell companies to buy luxury vehicles in Montana and other states to avoid paying California sales taxes and vehicle license fees.

In addition, on Aug. 24, 2026, the California Legislature approved McNerney’s Senate Joint Resolution 18, calling for the overturning of the infamous Supreme Court case “Citizens United,” which opened the floodgates to big money spending in politics.

Also, McNerney, as co-chair of the Delta Caucus, secured $158.2 million to protect the Sacramento-San Joaquin River Delta and the State Water Project. The Delta Caucus secured $90.2 million to protect the Delta and fortify its aging levees, along with up to $68 million to safeguard the State Water Project’s (SWP) California Aqueduct and canals, which are being undermined by the over-drafting of groundwater.

=== Senate Committee Assignments ===
- Chair, Revenue and Taxation
- Member, Energy, Utilities and Communications
- Member, Budget and Fiscal Review
- Member, Budget Subcommittee #2 on Resources, Environmental Protection and Energy
- Member, Agriculture
- Member, Military and Veterans Affairs
- Member, Joint Committee on Fairs Allocation and Classification

=== Select Committees ===
- Member, Select Committee on Bay Area Public Transit
- Member, Select Committee on California's Wine Industry
- Member, Select Committee on Green Economic Development
- Member, Select Committee on the Ports and Goods Movement

=== Caucus Memberships ===
- Senate Democratic Caucus
- Bay Area Caucus
- California Technology & Innovation Caucus
- Delta Caucus

=== Commission Memberships ===
- Delta Protection Commission
- Sierra Nevada Conservancy

== Political positions ==
=== United States Supreme Court ===
After the Supreme Court overturned Roe v. Wade in 2022, McNerney called it "a partisan body that is no longer a legitimate arbiter of our Constitution." He said it had a "far-right minority agenda" that is a "threat not only to our country, but to the world."

== Electoral history ==
=== U.S. House of Representatives ===
2004 California's 11th congressional district election
Primary election
Party	Candidate	Votes	%
Democratic	Jerry McNerney (write-in)	1,667	100.0
Total votes		1,667	100.0
General election
Republican	Richard Pombo (incumbent)	163,582	61.3
Democratic	Jerry McNerney	103,587	38.7
Total votes		267,169	100.0
Republican hold			

2006 California's 11th congressional district election
Primary election
Party	Candidate	Votes	%
Democratic	Jerry McNerney	23,598	52.8
Democratic	Steve Filson	12,744	28.5
Democratic	Steve Thomas	8,390	18.7
Total votes		44,732	100.0
General election
Democratic	Jerry McNerney	109,868	53.3
Republican	Richard Pombo (incumbent)	96,396	46.7
Total votes		206,264	100.0
Democratic gain from Republican			

2008 California's 11th congressional district election
Primary election
Party	Candidate	Votes	%
Democratic	Jerry McNerney (incumbent)	40,403	100.0
Total votes		40,403	100.0
General election
Democratic	Jerry McNerney (incumbent)	164,500	55.3
Republican	Dean Andal	133,104	44.7
American Independent	David Christensen (write-in)	12	0.0
Total votes		297,616	100.0
Democratic hold			

2010 California's 11th congressional district election
Party	Candidate	Votes	%
Democratic	Jerry McNerney (incumbent)	48,772	100.0
Total votes		48,772	100.0
General election
Democratic	Jerry McNerney (incumbent)	115,361	48.0
Republican	David Harmer	112,703	46.9
American Independent	David Christensen	12,439	5.1
Total votes		240,503	100.0
Democratic hold			

2012 California's 9th congressional district election
Primary election
Party	Candidate	Votes	%
Democratic	Jerry McNerney (incumbent)	45,696	47.8
Republican	Ricky Gill	38,488	40.2
Republican	John McDonald	11,458	12.0
Total votes		95,642	100.0
General election
Democratic	Jerry McNerney (incumbent)	118,373	55.6
Republican	Ricky Gill	94,704	44.4
Total votes		213,077	100.0
Democratic hold			

2014 California's 9th congressional district election
Primary election
Party	Candidate	Votes	%
Democratic	Jerry McNerney (incumbent)	38,295	49.4
Republican	Antonio C. Amador	20,424	26.3
Republican	Steve Anthony Colangelo	14,195	18.3
Republican	Karen "Mathews" Davis	4,637	6.0
Total votes		77,551	100.0
General election
Democratic	Jerry McNerney (incumbent)	63,475	52.4
Republican	Antonio C. Amador	57,729	47.6
Total votes		121,204	100.0
Democratic hold			

2016 California's 9th congressional district election
Primary election
Party	Candidate	Votes	%
Democratic	Jerry McNerney (incumbent)	71,634	55.3
Republican	Antonio C. Amador	28,161	21.7
Republican	Kathryn Nance	24,783	19.1
Libertarian	Alex Appleby	5,029	3.9
Total votes		129,607	100.0
General election
Democratic	Jerry McNerney (incumbent)	133,163	57.4
Republican	Antonio C. Amador	98,992	42.6
Total votes		232,155	100.0
Democratic hold			

2018 California's 9th congressional district election
Primary election
Party	Candidate	Votes	%
Democratic	Jerry McNerney (incumbent)	55,923	53.2
Republican	Marla Livengood	43,242	41.1
American Independent	Mike A. Tsarnas	6,038	5.7
Total votes		105,203	100.0
General election
Democratic	Jerry McNerney (incumbent)	113,414	56.5
Republican	Marla Livengood	87,349	43.5
Total votes		200,763	100.0
Democratic hold			

2020 California's 9th congressional district election
Primary election
Party	Candidate	Votes	%
Democratic	Jerry McNerney (incumbent)	86,556	57.0
Republican	Antonio C. Amador	45,962	30.3
Republican	William Martinek	19,255	12.7
Democratic	Crystal Sawyer-White (write-in)	22	0.0
Total votes		151,795	100.0
General election
Democratic	Jerry McNerney (incumbent)	174,252	57.6
Republican	Antonio C. Amador	128,358	42.4
Total votes		302,610	100.0
Democratic hold			

=== California State Senate ===
2024 California State Senate 5th district election
Primary election
Party	Candidate	Votes	%
Republican	Jim Shoemaker	75,630	43.7
Democratic	Jerry McNerney	57,435	33.2
Democratic	Carlos Villapudua	39,958	23.1
Total votes		173,023	100.0
General election
Democratic	Jerry McNerney	189,668	52.9
Republican	Jim Shoemaker	169,136	47.1
Total votes		358,804	100.0
Democratic hold			

== Personal life ==
McNerney resides in Pleasanton, California. He and his wife, Mary, have three children. McNerney is Roman Catholic.

U.S. House of Representatives
Preceded by Richard Pombo	Member of the U.S. House of Representatives from California's 11th congressional district 2007–2013	Succeeded by George Miller
Preceded by Barbara Lee	Member of the U.S. House of Representatives from California's 9th congressional district 2013–2023	Succeeded by Josh Harder
U.S. order of precedence (ceremonial)
Preceded by Devin Nunes as Former U.S. Representative	Order of precedence of the United States as Former U.S. Representative	Succeeded by Jackie Speier as Former U.S. Representative
