= United States House Energy Subcommittee on Oversight and Investigations =

United States House of Representatives Committee

Subcommittee of Committee on Energy and Commerce
- Active United States House of Representatives; 119th Congress

Leadership
- Chair: John Joyce (R)
- Ranking Member: Yvette Clarke (D)

Structure
- Seats: 16 (16 currently filled) 9/9 7/7
- Political parties: Majority (9): Republican (9); Minority (7): Democratic (7)

Meeting place
- 2125, Rayburn House Office Building; Washington, D.C. 20515

Phone number
- (202)-225-3641

The U.S. House Energy Subcommittee on Oversight and Investigations is a subcommittee within the House Committee on Energy and Commerce.

== Jurisdiction ==
Responsibility for oversight of agencies, departments, and programs within the jurisdiction of the full committee, and for conducting investigations within such jurisdiction.

The House Energy and Commerce Committee has jurisdiction over domestic and international sport, has investigated reports of abuse in sports, and has led congressional efforts to enact new laws to at better protect athletes. It has an interest in sexual assault, sexual misconduct, sexual mistreatment, sexual harassment, and other sexual offenses in the U.S. Olympic movement and organized sports.

== Members, 119th Congress ==
Majority	Minority
Gary Palmer, PA, Chair; Troy Balderson, Ohio, Vice Chair; Morgan Griffith, Virginia; Neal Dunn, Florida; Dan Crenshaw, Texas; Randy Weber, Texas; Rick Allen, Georgia; Russ Fulcher, Idaho; Michael Rulli, Ohio	Yvette Clarke, New York, Ranking Member; Diana DeGette, Colorado; Paul Tonko, New York; Lori Trahan, Massachusetts; Lizzie Fletcher, Texas; Alexandria Ocasio-Cortez, New York; Kevin Mullin, California
Ex officio
Brett Guthrie, Kentucky	Frank Pallone, New Jersey

== Historical membership rosters ==
=== 115th Congress ===
Majority	Minority
Timothy F. Murphy, Pennsylvania, Chair; Morgan Griffith, Virginia, Vice Chair; Joe Barton, Texas; Michael C. Burgess, Texas; Susan Brooks, Indiana; Chris Collins, New York; Tim Walberg, Michigan; Mimi Walters, California; Ryan Costello, Pennsylvania; Buddy Carter, Georgia	Diana DeGette, Colorado, Ranking Member; Jan Schakowsky, Illinois; Kathy Castor, Florida; Paul Tonko, New York; Yvette Clarke, New York; Raul Ruiz, California; Scott Peters, California
Ex officio
Greg Walden, Oregon	Frank Pallone, New Jersey

=== 116th Congress ===
Majority	Minority
Diana DeGette, Colorado, Chair; Jan Schakowsky, Illinois; Joe Kennedy III, Massachusetts; Raul Ruiz, California; Ann McLane Kuster, New Hampshire; Kathy Castor, Florida; John Sarbanes, Maryland; Paul Tonko, New York; Yvette Clarke, New York; Scott Peters, California	Brett Guthrie, Kentucky, Ranking Member; Michael C. Burgess, Texas; David McKinley, West Virginia; Morgan Griffith, Virginia; Susan Brooks, Indiana; Markwayne Mullin, Oklahoma; Jeff Duncan, South Carolina
Ex officio
Frank Pallone, New Jersey	Greg Walden, Oregon

=== 117th Congress ===
Majority	Minority
Diana DeGette, Colorado, Chair; Ann McLane Kuster, New Hampshire; Kathleen Rice, New York; Jan Schakowsky, Illinois; Paul Tonko, New York; Raul Ruiz, California; Scott Peters, California, Vice Chair; Kim Schrier, Washington; Lori Trahan, Massachusetts; Tom O'Halleran, Arizona	Morgan Griffith, Virginia, Ranking Member; Michael C. Burgess, Texas; David McKinley, West Virginia; Billy Long, Missouri; Neal Dunn, Florida; John Joyce, Pennsylvania; Gary Palmer, Alabama
Ex officio
Frank Pallone, New Jersey	Cathy McMorris Rodgers, Washington

=== 118th Congress ===
Majority	Minority
Morgan Griffith, Virginia, Chair; Debbie Lesko, Arizona, Vice Chair; Michael C. Burgess, Texas; Brett Guthrie, Kentucky; Jeff Duncan, South Carolina; Gary Palmer, Alabama; Dan Crenshaw, Texas; Kelly Armstrong, North Dakota; Kat Cammack, Florida	Kathy Castor, Florida, Ranking Member; Diana DeGette, Colorado; Jan Schakowsky, Illinois; Paul Tonko, New York; Raul Ruiz, California; Scott Peters, California
Ex officio
Cathy McMorris Rodgers, Washington	Frank Pallone, New Jersey
