= Congressional Asian Pacific American Caucus =

United States congressional caucus

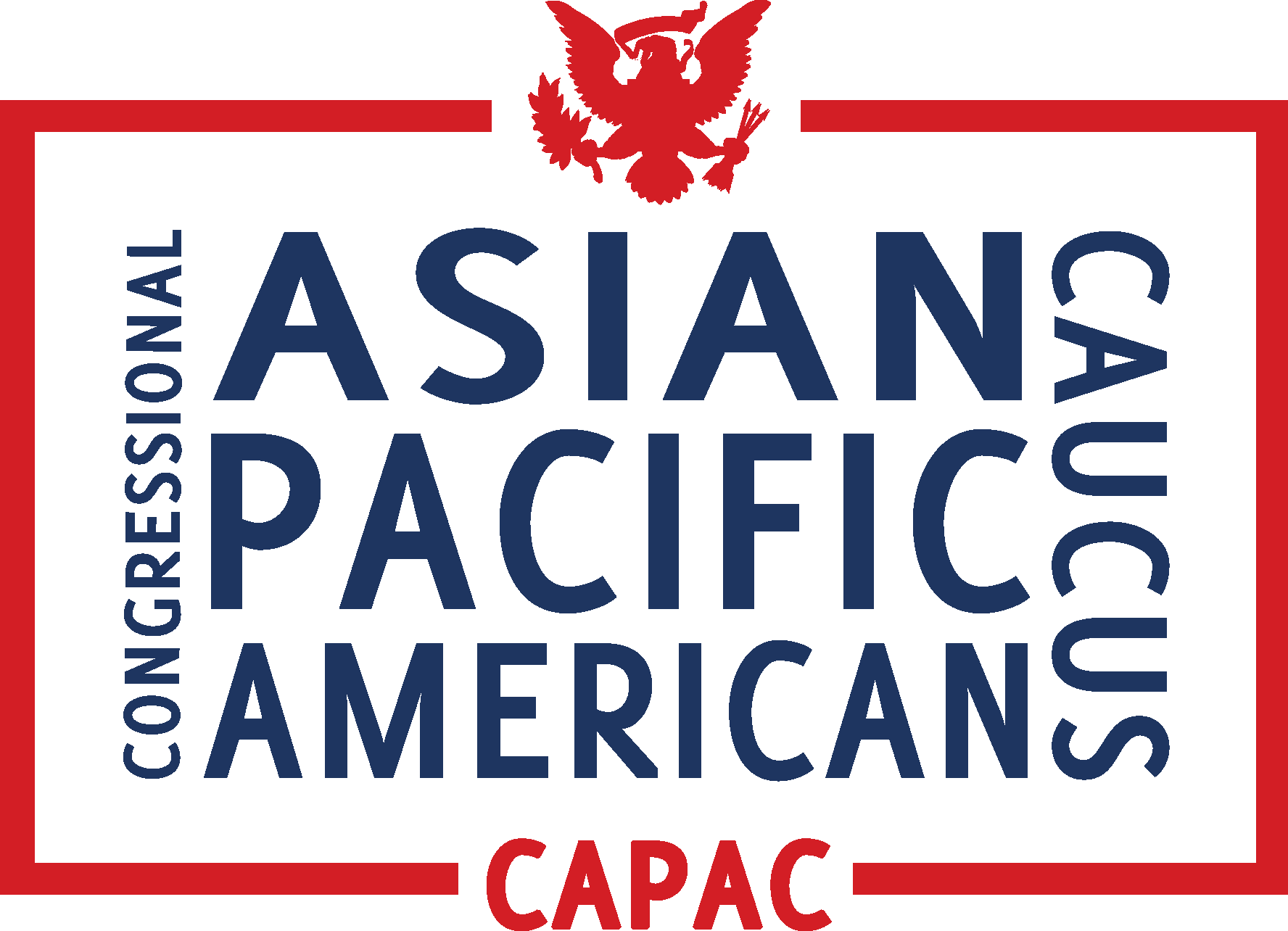
- Chair: Grace Meng
- Founder: Norman Mineta
- Founded: May 16, 1994; 32 years ago
- Headquarters: Washington, D.C.
- Seats in the House: 75 / 435
- Seats in the Senate: 9 / 100
- Seats in the House Democratic Caucus: 75 / 214
- Seats in House Republican Conference: 0 / 219

Website
- Official website

The Congressional Asian Pacific American Caucus (CAPAC) is a United States congressional caucus consisting of members of Congress who are Asian Pacific American (AAPI) and have a strong interest in promoting issues concerning the AAPI community. CAPAC was founded on May 16, 1994, by then-Representative Norman Mineta.

While CAPAC describes itself as nonpartisan, all of its current members are Democrats, though some past members (such as Joseph Cao from Louisiana) were Republicans. Members of CAPAC speak at the House Democrats' issues conference, the party's annual retreat.

The caucus generally includes members of East, Southeast, South or Pacific Islander descent, who are executive board members of the caucus. It also includes associate members who have high concentrations of AAPI constituents in their district, or those with an interest in AAPI issues in general.

In the 119th Congress, CAPAC announced its newly elected leadership, with Representative Grace Meng (NY-06) elected as Chair, succeeding Judy Chu (CA-28), who transitioned to Chair Emerita after 14 years of leadership. Meng has been critical of the Trump administration's domestic policies.

== Current members ==
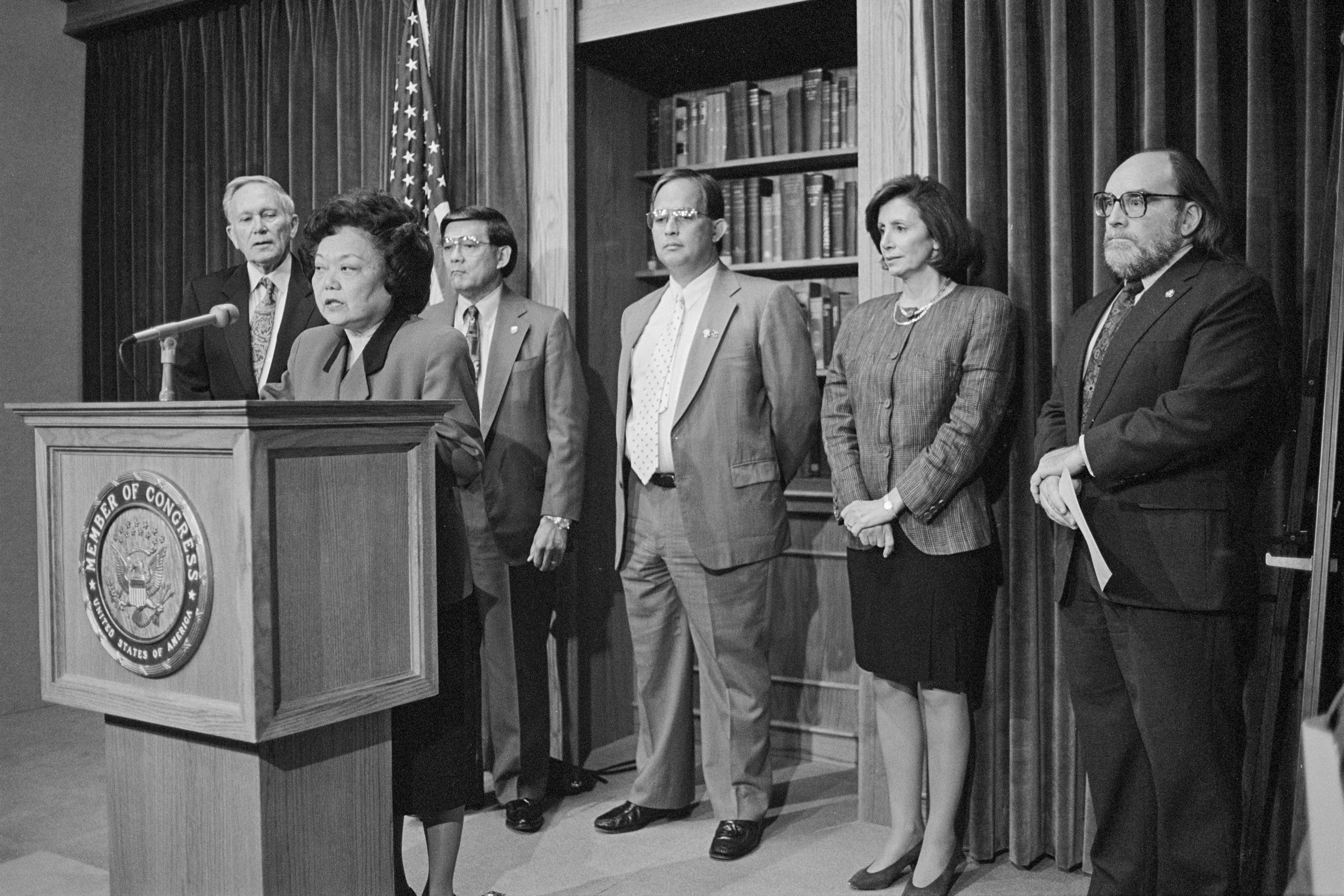
Representative Patsy Mink announces the formation of the Congressional Asian Pacific American Caucus at a press conference with (left to right) Representatives Don Edwards and Norman Mineta, Guam Delegate Robert Underwood, and Representatives Nancy Pelosi and Neil Abercrombie

Congressional Asian Pacific American Caucus in the 118th United States Congress Leadership and executive board members Associate members

=== 119th Congress Leadership ===
- Chair: Grace Meng (D) (NY-06)
- First Vice-Chair: Mark Takano (D) (CA-39)
- Second Vice-Chair: Jill Tokuda (D) (HI-02)
- Whip: Ami Bera (D) (CA-06)
- Freshman Representative: Suhas Subramanyam (D) (VA-10)
- Chair Emerita: Judy Chu (D) (CA-28)

=== Executive board members ===
- Senator Tammy Duckworth (D) (Illinois)
- Senator Mazie Hirono (D) (Hawaii)
- Senator Andy Kim (D) (New Jersey)
- Senator Brian Schatz (D) (Hawaii)
- Representative Yassamin Ansari (D) (AZ-03)
- Representative Ed Case (D) (HI-01)
- Representative Dan Goldman (D) (NY-10)
- Representative Jimmy Gomez (D) (CA-34)
- Representative Al Green (D) (TX-09)
- Representative Pramila Jayapal (D) (WA-07)
- Representative Ro Khanna (D) (CA-17)
- Representative Raja Krishnamoorthi (D) (IL-08)
- Representative Ted Lieu (D) (CA-36)
- Representative Doris Matsui (D) (CA-07)
- Representative Dave Min (D) (CA-47)
- Representative Bobby Scott (D) (VA-03)
- Representative Marilyn Strickland (D) (WA-10)
- Representative Shri Thanedar (D) (MI-13)
- Representative Derek Tran (D) (CA-45)

=== Associate members ===
- Senator Cory Booker (D) (New Jersey)
- Senator Catherine Cortez Masto (D) (Nevada)
- Senator Kirsten Gillibrand (D) (New York)
- Senator Alex Padilla (D) (California)
- Senator Jacky Rosen (D) (Nevada)
- Representative Pete Aguilar (D) (CA-33)
- Representative Nanette Barragán (D) (CA-44)
- Representative Wesley Bell (D) (MO-01)
- Representative Suzanne Bonamici (D) (OR-01)
- Representative Brendan Boyle (D) (PA-02)
- Representative Salud Carbajal (D) (CA-24)
- Representative Gil Cisneros (D) (CA-31)
- Representative Lou Correa (D) (CA-46)
- Representative Suzan DelBene (D) (WA-01)
- Representative Mark DeSaulnier (D) (CA-10)
- Representative Debbie Dingell (D) (MI-06)
- Representative Lizzie Fletcher (D) (TX-07)
- Representative Valerie Foushee (D) (NC-04)
- Representative John Garamendi (D) (CA-08)
- Representative Robert Garcia (D) (CA-42)
- Representative Josh Gottheimer (D) (NJ-05)
- Representative Josh Harder (D) (CA-09)
- Representative Steven Horsford (D) (NV-04)
- Representative Sara Jacobs (D) (CA-51)
- Representative Sydney Kamlager-Dove (D) (CA-37)
- Representative Tim Kennedy (D) (NY-26)
- Representative George Latimer (D) (NY-16)
- Representative Susie Lee (D) (NV-03)
- Representative Sam Liccardo (D) (CA-16)
- Representative Lucy McBath (D) (GA-06)
- Representative April McClain Delaney (D) (MD-06)
- Representative Gregory Meeks (D) (NY-05)
- Representative Rob Menendez (D) (NJ-08)
- Representative Kevin Mullin (D) (CA-15)
- Representative Jerry Nadler (D) (NY-12)
- Representative Jimmy Panetta (D) (CA-19)
- Representative Scott Peters (D) (CA-50)
- Representative Ayanna Pressley (D) (MA-07)
- Representative Jamie Raskin (D) (MD-08)
- Representative Deborah Ross (D) (NC-02)
- Representative Andrea Salinas (D) (OR-06)
- Representative Linda Sánchez (D) (CA-38)
- Representative Jan Schakowsky (D) (IL-09)
- Representative Kim Schrier (D) (WA-08)
- Representative Brad Sherman (D) (CA-32)
- Representative Lateefah Simon (D) (CA-12)
- Representative Adam Smith (D) (WA-09)
- Representative Haley Stevens (D) (MI-11)
- Representative Tom Suozzi (D) (NY-03)
- Representative Emilia Sykes (D) (OH-13)
- Representative Paul Tonko (D) (NY-20)
- Representative Norma Torres (D) (CA-35)
- Representative Lori Trahan (D) (MA-03)
- Representative Juan Vargas (D) (CA-52)
- Representative Nydia Velázquez (D) (NY-07)
- Representative James Walkinshaw (D) (VA-11)
- Representative Maxine Waters (D) (CA-43)
- Representative Bonnie Watson Coleman (D) (NJ-12)

Last updated: April 6, 2026

== List of chairs ==
Former chairs of CAPAC are listed below.

Image	Chair	Start	End	District
	Norm Mineta	May 16, 1994	October 1995	CA-15
	Patsy Mink	October 1995	January 3, 1997	HI-02
	Robert Underwood	January 3, 1997	January 3, 2001	GU-AL
	David Wu	January 3, 2001	January 2004	OR-01
	Mike Honda	January 2004	January 3, 2011	CA-17
	Judy Chu	January 3, 2011	January 3, 2025	CA-28
	Grace Meng	January 3, 2025	present	NY-06

== Former members ==
Vice Presidents of the United States

- Kamala Harris (D-U.S.), 49th Vice President of the United States (2021–2025), United States Senator from California (2017–2021), 32nd Attorney General of California (2011–2017), and 27th District Attorney of San Francisco (2004–2011).

Members of Congress

- Former Representative Colin Allred (D) (TX-32)
- Former Representative Karen Bass (D) (CA-37)
- Former Representative Carolyn Bourdeaux (D) (GA-07)
- Representative Katherine Clark (D) (MA-05)
- Former Representative Gerry Connolly (D) (VA-11)
- Representative Jason Crow (D) (CO-06)
- Former Representative Anna Eshoo (D) (CA-16)
- Former Representative Marcia Fudge (D) (OH-11)
- Former Representative Deb Haaland (D) (NM-01)
- Representative Hakeem Jeffries (D) (NY-08)
- Former Representative Kai Kahele (D) (HI-02) †
- Former Representative Barbara Lee (D) (CA-12) †
- Representative Zoe Lofgren (D) (CA-18)
- Former Representative Alan Lowenthal (D) (CA-47)
- Former Representative Carolyn Maloney (D) (NY-12)
- Former Representative Jerry McNerney (D) (CA-09)
- Former Representative Stephanie Murphy (D) (FL-07) †
- Former Representative Grace Napolitano (D) (CA-31)
- Former Representative Katie Porter (D) (CA-47)
- Former Representative Lucille Roybal-Allard (D) (CA-40)
- Former Delegate Gregorio Sablan (D) (MP-AL) †
- Former Delegate Michael San Nicolas (D) (GU-AL) †
- Former Representative (now Senator) Adam Schiff (D) (CA-30)
- Former Representative Jackie Speier (D) (CA-14)
- Representative Dina Titus (D) (NV-01)
- Former Representative David Trone (D) (MD-06)
- Former Representative Jennifer Wexton (D) (VA-10)

† Served in leadership or as an executive board member

== See also ==
- Asian Pacific Americans in the United States Congress
- ASPIRE PAC
