= Nanette Barragán =

American attorney & politician (born 1976)

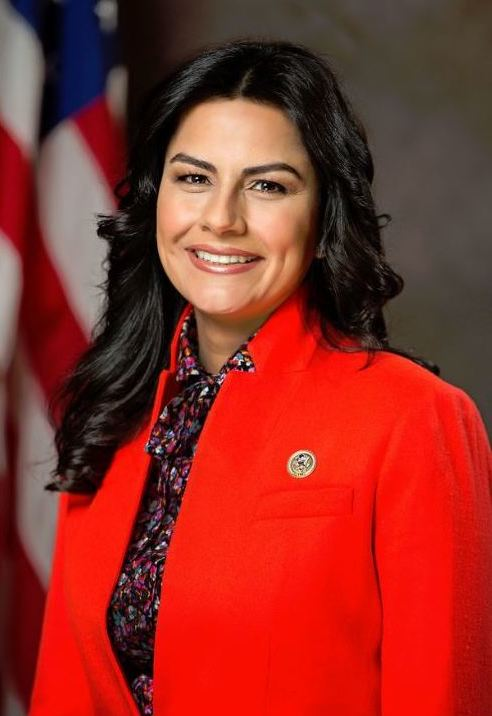

Member of the U.S. House of Representatives from California's 44th district
- Incumbent
- Assumed office January 3, 2017
- Preceded by: Janice Hahn

Personal details
- Born: Nanette Díaz Barragán; September 15, 1976 (age 50) Los Angeles, California, U.S.
- Party: Democratic
- Education: University of California, Los Angeles (BA); University of Southern California (JD)
- Website: House website Campaign website
- Barragán's voice Barragán on access to Alzheimer's treatments. Recorded April 28, 2022

Nanette Díaz Barragán (/nəˈnɛt ˈbærəɡən/ nə-NET BARR-ə-gən; born September 15, 1976) is an American politician and attorney serving as the U.S. representative for California's 44th congressional district since 2017. A member of the Democratic Party, she previously served as a Hermosa Beach city councilmember from 2013 to 2015.

== Early life and education ==
Barragán was born in Harbor City, Los Angeles; she is the youngest of 11 siblings, raised by immigrants from Mexico in Torrance and the surrounding area, where she attended North Torrance High School and played softball. She earned her Bachelor of Arts degree in political science with a minor in public policy from the University of California, Los Angeles in 2000. She received her Juris Doctor degree at the University of Southern California in 2005, where she served on the Interdisciplinary Law Journal.

During college and until 2003, Barragán served as the Executive Director of the Gillian S. Fuller Foundation (formerly the Fuller Foundation), where she was in charge of funding nonprofits focused on education, the environment, and youth programs. Funded organizations included Heal the Bay, the Nature Conservancy, the Natural Resources Defense Council, Para Los Niños, Proyecto Pastoral, and Literacy Partners.

== Legal career ==
In 2003, Barragán served as an extern to Justice Carlos Moreno at the California Supreme Court. In 2004, she served as an extern at the Los Angeles Legal Aid Foundation, a law firm for low-income people in Los Angeles. There she assisted pro per workers who needed assistance filing claims for unpaid overtime and meal breaks.

In 2005, Barragán received an externship at the United States Attorney's Office, Central District of California where she worked with attorneys in the Organized Crime and Terrorism section. There she assisted on a money laundering trial team, in investigations, and in prosecuting Central Violations Bureau cases.

Barragán then joined Latham & Watkins LLP, where she worked on a variety of cases from land use to securities litigation. While at Latham, she was the lead attorney in an immigration asylum case spanning three years for a child and mother from Guatemala; withholding of removal was granted. After Hurricane Katrina, Barragán and her colleague, Blake Megdal, flew to Biloxi, Mississippi, to provide pro bono assistance with insurance claims. She also served as a child advocate and was the Spanish-speaking adoption attorney for low-income families seeking adoptions.

== Early political career ==
Barragán started her political career with the Clinton White House in the Office of Public Liaison doing African American outreach, and served as the facilitator between the president and African American organizations such as the National Association for the Advancement of Colored People (NAACP). In 1999, she worked with the NAACP's Washington Bureau on health policy and racial health disparities. Thereafter she volunteered for many federal and local candidates while serving on the Board of the L.A. County Young Democrats for three years before attending law school.

In 2012, Barragán took a leave of absence from her law firm to move to Florida to work on President Barack Obama's reelection campaign with the voter protection team. She served as the out-of-state volunteer attorney director and recruited attorneys across the country to volunteer in Florida to make sure every eligible voter had the opportunity to vote.

=== Hermosa Beach City Council ===
In 2013, Barragán ran for Hermosa Beach City Council, fighting an oil company's proposal to drill 34 oil and water injection wells in Hermosa Beach and into the Santa Monica Bay. She beat six other candidates, becoming the first Latina elected to the council and the first woman in ten years.

Barragán resigned from office on July 31, 2015, to run for Congress in the state's 44th district.

== U.S. House of Representatives ==
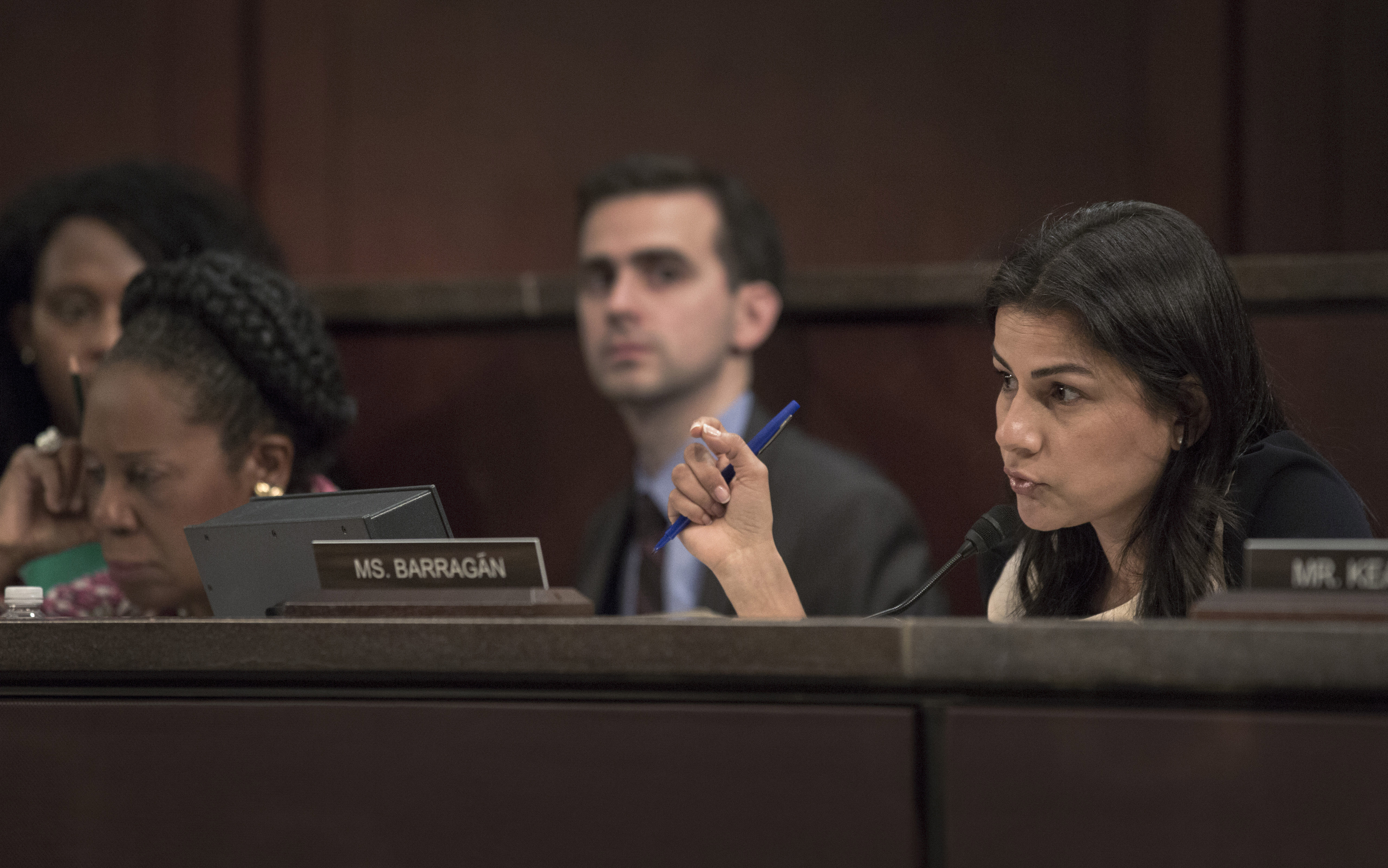
Barragán asks questions at a hearing on U.S. Customs and Border Protection

=== Elections ===
==== 2016 ====
Barragán officially announced her candidacy for California's 44th congressional district on Equal Pay Day in mid-April 2015. The seat was being vacated by Democrat Janice Hahn, who decided to run for the Los Angeles County Board of Supervisors.

In June 2015, Barragán said, "The district is one where only 60 percent graduate from high school and 10 percent go on to college. That's how people live. I'm one of those 10-percenters who beat the odds. (…) I've achieved the American dream. Now I’m coming home to make sure others have the same shot at the dream."

After announcing her candidacy, Barragán received major endorsements, including EMILY's List, a nationally prominent backer of female Democratic candidates; National Women's Political Caucus (NWPC); the California League of Conservation Voters (CLCV); the Latino Victory Project; former South Gate Mayor Henry Gonzalez; South Gate Council members Bill De Witt, Maria Davila and Belen Bernal; Carson Commissioner Janice Schaffer; and scores of congressional members, including Representatives Linda Sanchez, Lucille Roybal-Allard, Eric Swalwell, Raul Ruiz, Ruben Gallego, Joaquin Castro, and Lois Frankel.

In the November 8 general election, Barragán defeated state senator Isadore Hall III.

==== 2018 ====
In the November 6, 2018, general election, Barragán faced Compton mayor Aja Brown, who had withdrawn from the campaign in April due to her pregnancy with her first child. Barragán defeated Brown, 97,944 votes (68.3%) to 45,378 (31.7%).

==== 2020 ====
In the November 3, 2020, general election, Barragán faced fellow Democrat Analilia Joya and won, 139,661 votes (67.8%) to 66,375 (32.2%).

=== Tenure ===
In July 2019, Barragán toured facilities on the Mexico–United States border with a congressional delegation.

Barragán has a reputation as difficult to work for and has struggled to retain staff. Analysis by Legistorm, a site that tracks congressional employment, found that her personal office had the third highest rate of turnover in the House of Representatives between 2001 and 2021.

Barragán assumed leadership of the Congressional Hispanic Caucus in January 2023 despite caucus members' fears over her reputation as a toxic boss. Caucus staffers including the executive director quit before she assumed leadership. Barragán hired a well-respected congressional staffer as caucus executive director but fired her a month into her tenure, the cause being an email the executive director sent about the House and Senate floor schedule that Barragán was unhappy with, a person familiar with the situation told The Washington Post. The dismissal, combined with earlier resignations, left the caucus without staff.

=== Committee assignments ===
For the 119th Congress:

- Committee on Energy and Commerce
  - Subcommittee on Communications and Technology
  - Subcommittee on Environment
  - Subcommittee on Health

=== Caucus membership ===
- Congressional Hispanic Caucus (chair)
- Black Maternal Health Caucus
- Congressional Progressive Caucus
- Congressional LGBT Equality Caucus
- Congressional Caucus for Women's Issues
- Congressional Asian Pacific American Caucus
- Future Forum
- Medicare for All Caucus
- Congressional Coalition on Adoption
- Congressional Caucus for the Equal Rights Amendment

== Political positions ==
=== Abortion ===
Barragán has a 100% rating from NARAL Pro-Choice America and an F grade from the Susan B. Anthony List for her abortion-related voting record. She opposed the 2022 overturning of Roe v. Wade, calling it "a sad day."

=== Environment ===
==== Banning hydrofluoric acid at oil refineries ====
Barragán supports banning hydrofluoric acid (HF) at oil refineries, where it is often the chemical used for producing the high octane alkylate component of gasoline. She has pointed out the danger of storing the volatile chemical on site at refineries, where explosions are not uncommon, where there are limited safeguards against natural disasters and terrorist incidents, and where many plants already have long histories of limited accidental HF release incidents. A larger release could cause a toxic ground hugging cloud leading to a mass casualty event in the vicinity of the release site.

== Personal life ==
Barragán watches and plays baseball. In high school, she petitioned school leadership to allow girls to try out for the school's baseball team. Her favorite team is the Los Angeles Dodgers. In 2017, she was invited to throw out the ceremonial first pitch at Dodger Stadium. Since 2017, Barragán has played in the annual Congressional Baseball Game. She has also played in the Congressional Women's Softball Game.

Barragán is Catholic.

== Electoral history ==
2016 United States House of Representatives elections in California
Party	Candidate	Votes	%
Democratic	Nanette Barragán	93,124	52.2
Democratic	Isadore Hall	85,289	47.8
Total votes		178,413	100.0
Democratic hold			

2018 United States House of Representatives elections in California
Party	Candidate	Votes	%
Democratic	Nanette Barragán (Incumbent)	97,944	68.3
Democratic	Aja Brown (withdrew)	45,378	31.7
Total votes		143,322	100.0
Democratic hold			

2020 United States House of Representatives elections in California
Party	Candidate	Votes	%
Democratic	Nanette Barragán (incumbent)	139,661	67.8
Democratic	Analilia Joya	66,375	32.2
Total votes		206,036	100.0
Democratic hold			

2022 United States House of Representatives elections in California
Party	Candidate	Votes	%
Democratic	Nanette Barragán (incumbent)	100,160	72.2
Republican	Paul Jones	38,554	27.8
Total votes		138,714	100.0
Democratic hold			

2024 United States House of Representatives elections in California
Party	Candidate	Votes	%
Democratic	Nanette Barragán (incumbent)	164,765	71.4
Republican	Roger Groh	66,087	28.6
Total votes		230,852	100.0
Democratic hold			

== See also ==
- List of Hispanic and Latino Americans in the United States Congress
- Women in the United States House of Representatives

U.S. House of Representatives
Preceded by Janice Hahn	Member of the U.S. House of Representatives from California's 44th congressional district 2017–present	Incumbent
Preceded by Raul Ruiz	Chair of the Congressional Hispanic Caucus; 2023–2025	Succeeded by Adriano Espaillat
U.S. order of precedence (ceremonial)
Preceded by Don Bacon	United States representatives by seniority 157th	Succeeded by Jack Bergman
