= Paul Tonko =

American politician (born 1949)

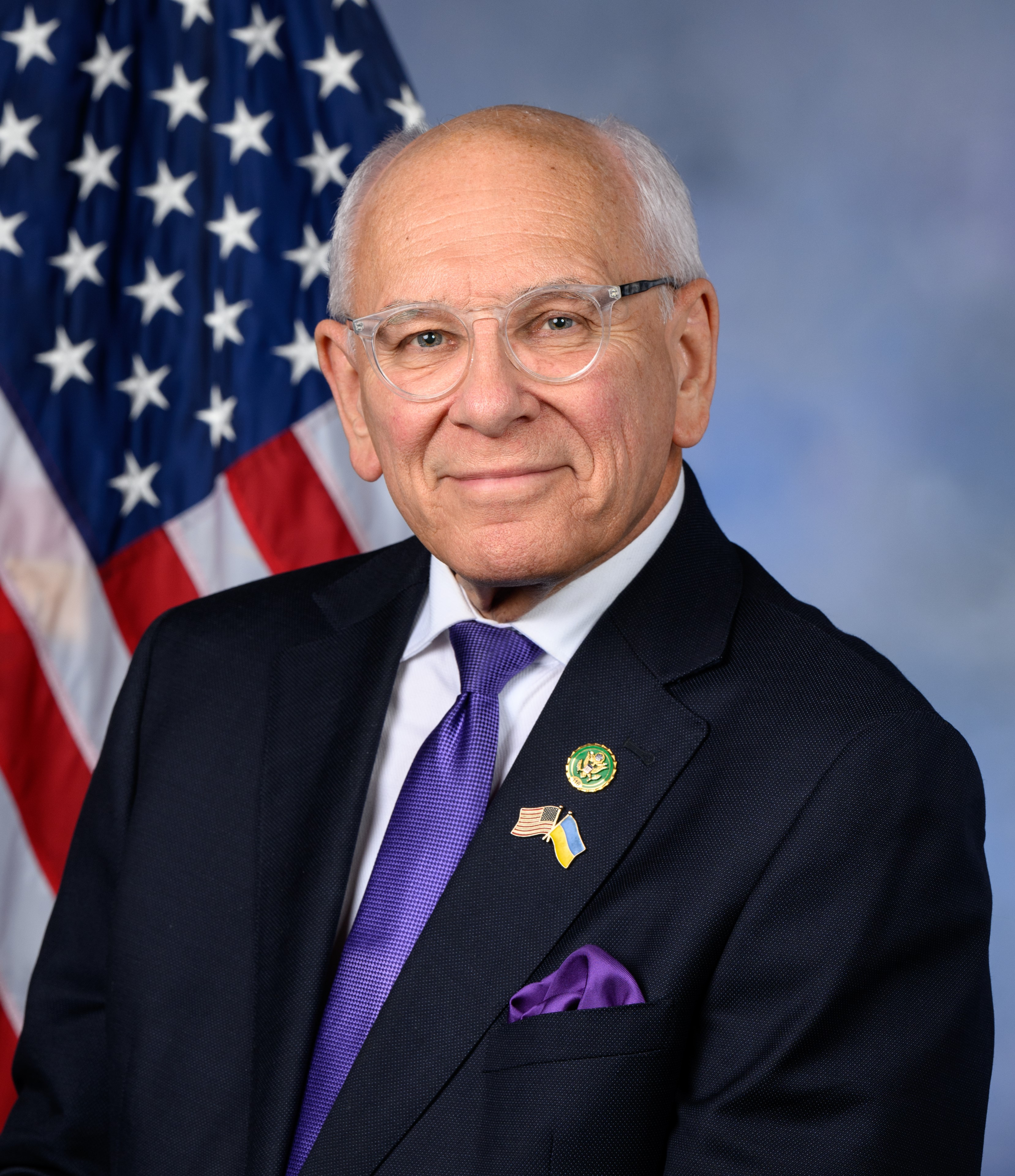
- Official portrait, 2024

Member of the U.S. House of Representatives from New York
- Incumbent
- Assumed office January 3, 2009
- Preceded by: Michael McNulty
- Constituency: 21st district (2009–2013); 20th district (2013–present)

Member of the New York State Assembly from the 105th district
- In office April 1983 – June 2007
- Preceded by: Gail S. Shaffer
- Succeeded by: George A. Amedore Jr.

Personal details
- Born: June 18, 1949 (age 77) Amsterdam, New York, U.S.
- Party: Democratic
- Education: Clarkson University (BS)
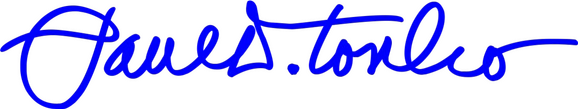
- Signature
- Website: House website Campaign website
- Tonko's voice Tonko on the destruction of PFAS waste. Recorded July 13, 2022

Paul David Tonko (/ˈtɒŋkoʊ/ TONK-oh; born June 18, 1949) is an American politician serving as the U.S. representative for New York's 20th congressional district since 2013. He represented the 21st congressional district from 2009 to 2013. A member of the Democratic Party, Tonko has been called a staunch progressive. After the 2020 redistricting cycle and effective for the 118th Congress, the 20th district will include all of Albany, Saratoga, and Schenectady Counties as well as part of Rensselaer County.

From 1983 to 2007, Tonko represented the 105th district in the New York State Assembly. He was appointed to serve as president and CEO of the New York State Energy Research and Development Authority from 2007 until his resignation in April 2008. Soon afterward, he declared his candidacy for Congress, and was elected in November 2008.

Tonko is the ranking member of the House Energy and Commerce Subcommittee on Environment in the 119th Congress. Since 2013, he has been the highest-ranking Democrat on the panel, which authorizes, oversees and investigates the Environmental Protection Agency (EPA).

== Early life, education and early career ==
Tonko is a lifelong resident of Amsterdam, New York, near Schenectady, and is of primarily Polish descent. He graduated from Amsterdam's Wilbur H. Lynch High School in 1967, and received a Bachelor of Science degree in mechanical and industrial engineering from Clarkson University in Potsdam, New York in 1971.

An engineer for the New York Public Service Commission, Tonko became active in local politics in the early 1970s and successfully ran for the Montgomery County Board of Supervisors. He was a member of the board from 1976 to 1983, and the board's chairman from 1981 to 1983. Tonko was the youngest person in county history to be elected to the board of supervisors.

== New York State Assembly (1983–2007) ==
In January 1983, Assemblywoman Gail S. Shaffer resigned her 105th district seat to take office as Secretary of State of New York. The Democratic Party, as well as the Liberal Party, nominated Tonko to contest an April 12 special election for the seat against former Schoharie County Clerk Eugene Hallock, the Republican and Conservative nominee. Tonko defeated Hallock in a close race. Tonko was reelected 13 times, serving in the Assembly until 2007.

While in the Assembly, Tonko served as chair of the Energy Committee from 1992 until his departure from the Assembly in 2007. He was also a member of standing committees on Agriculture, Transportation and Education, where he was the original sponsor and a chief proponent of the College Tuition Savings Program that was signed into law in 1997.

Tonko sponsored Timothy's Law, a 2006 law that requires health insurers to cover mental health treatment. He also sponsored the Northeast Dairy Compact, and chaired the Legislative Commission on Rural Resources,

Tonko resigned his Assembly seat in June 2007 to become President and CEO of the New York State Energy Research and Development Authority.

== U.S. House of Representatives (2009–present) ==
=== Elections ===
==== 2008 ====
On April 25, 2008, Tonko stepped down from his position at the New York State Energy Research and Development Authority after ten-term Democratic Congressman Michael McNulty announced his upcoming retirement from Congress. He subsequently entered the race to succeed McNulty in the 21st district. Tonko won the Democratic primary on September 9, defeating four other candidates.

In the November 4 general election, Tonko defeated Republican Schenectady County Legislator James Buhrmaster by a decisive margin. According to the Times Union, "Tonko's name recognition ... accomplishment in the Legislature, such as the passage of mental health parity legislation, and his record" contributed to his win. He had effectively clinched a seat in Congress in the primary; the 21st had long been the only safe Democratic district in the state outside the New York City, Buffalo and Rochester areas.

==== 2010–present ====
Tonko ran for reelection on the Democratic, Working Families and Independence Party lines. He was challenged by Republican and Conservative Party nominee Ted Danz, a former United States Navy Reservist and small business owner in the cooling and heating business. Tonko raised almost $980,000, and spent almost $780,000 on his campaign; Danz raised about $44,000 and spent about $42,000 on his campaign. The New York Times rated the seat "Solid Democratic", with a "99.8%" to "100% chance" that Tonko would win. The major issues in the 2010 race were Tonko's votes for Obamacare, the Stimulus Package (ARRA), and the Energy Bill. The Albany Times Union endorsed Tonko, citing "a way of thinking and speaking like the engineer that he once was" and his support of the economic stimulus bill and health care bills. Tonko won the November 2 general election, 124,889 votes to 85,752.

Redistricting saw Tonko's district renumbered the 20th district. It lost much of its more rural territory to the west. To make up for the loss in population, it was pushed further into Saratoga County. The new 20th was no less Democratic than the old 21st, and Tonko defeated Bob Dieterich in 2012, Jim Fischer in 2014, and Joe Vitollo in 2016 and 2018. He defeated Liz Joy in 2020 and 2022. He defeated Kevin Waltz in 2024.

=== Tenure ===
Tonko was one of the 19 most liberal House members, according to the National Journal, for 2011. He voted with President Joe Biden's stated position 100% of the time in the 117th Congress, according to a FiveThirtyEight analysis.

When he entered Congress, Tonko said he wanted to primarily focus on energy policy. He sponsored a bill to create an $800 million research program in wind energy technologies, which would benefit GE in his district. He also wanted to create a research program to improve the efficiency of gas turbines used in power generation systems that convert heat into energy. In 2010, Tonko got a provision in a House-passed bill, following the BP disaster in the Gulf of Mexico, to prevent future spills and help small businesses in spill research. In 2011, he sponsored an amendment seeking to protect the Environmental Protection Agency's authority to regulate carbon emissions.

Tonko praised the 2011 State of the Union Address, saying, "the President set out a bold agenda for our nation, an agenda that will focus on growing our economy, growing jobs, and growing opportunity for the middle class". He has also often warned of the threat that Obamacare's repeal would pose to small businesses, young people, and seniors.

Tonko has worked to raise awareness about the region's waterways, chiefly the Hudson and Mohawk rivers, and the effects of flooding after Hurricane Irene. Seeking a comprehensive flood mitigation and economic development strategy, Tonko introduced the Hudson-Mohawk Basin Act in 2012.

Tonko became a prominent opponent of the Trans Pacific Partnership (TPP) in 2015, citing American trade deficits and the use of child labor by at least four countries that had already signed the pact as among his reasons for opposing the deal.

In 2017, Tonko was one of three Catholic politicians whom Bishop Edward Bernard Scharfenberger of Albany publicly rebuked for participating in a rally supporting Planned Parenthood.

In January 2019, Tonko—a member of the House Energy and Commerce Committee—was named chair of that committee's Subcommittee on the Environment and Climate Change.

On October 1, 2020, Tonko co-signed a letter to Secretary of State Mike Pompeo that condemned Azerbaijan’s offensive operations against the Armenian-populated enclave of Nagorno-Karabakh, denounced Turkey’s role in the Nagorno-Karabakh conflict, and criticized "false equivalence between Armenia and Azerbaijan, even as the latter threatens war and refuses to agree to monitoring along the line of contact."

In 2022, Tonko was instrumental in passing provisions contained in the CHIPS and Science Act (PL 117-167) into law.

On February 5, 2026, Tonko came out in support of abolishing ICE.

==== Syria ====
In 2023, Tonko was among 56 Democrats to vote in favor of H. Con. Res. 21, which directed President Joe Biden to remove U.S. troops from Syria within 180 days.

=== Committee assignments ===
- Committee on Energy and Commerce
  - Subcommittee on Environment (Ranking Member)
  - Subcommittee on Energy
  - Subcommittee on Oversight and Investigations
- Committee on the Budget

=== Caucus memberships ===
Tonko is a member of more than 65 House caucuses. Below is a sample of his memberships:

- Black Maternal Health Caucus
- Congressional Asian Pacific American Caucus
- Congressional Progressive Caucus
- Congressional Caucus on Parkinson's Disease
- Bipartisan Congressional Task Force on Alzheimer's disease
- Congressional Arts Caucus
- Congressional Solar Caucus
- Congressional Taiwan Caucus
- Congressional Lesbian, Gay, Bisexual, and Transgender (LGBT) Equality Caucus
- House Baltic Caucus
- Rare Disease Caucus
- Congressional Caucus on Turkey and Turkish Americans

== Electoral history ==
=== U.S. House of Representatives ===
US House election, 2008: New York District 21
Primary election
Party	Candidate	Votes	%
Democratic	Paul Tonko	15,932	39.50%
Democratic	Tracey Brooks	12,166	30.16%
Democratic	Phillip Steck	7,498	18.59%
Democratic	Darius Shahinfar	4,002	9.92%
Democratic	Joseph Sullivan	738	1.83%
Total votes		40,336	100
General election
Democratic	Paul Tonko	159,849	57.94%
Working Families	Paul Tonko	11,437	4.15%
Total	Paul Tonko	171,286	62.09%
Republican	Jim Buhrmaster	85,267	30.91%
Conservative	Jim Buhrmaster	11,332	4.11%
Total	Jim Buhrmaster	96,599	35.02%
Independence	Phil Steck	7,965	2.89%
Write-in		22	0.01%
Total votes		275,872	100
Democratic hold			

US House election, 2010: New York District 21
Party	Candidate	Votes	%
Democratic	Paul Tonko	107,136	50.83%
Independence	Paul Tonko	9,625	4.57%
Working Families	Paul Tonko	8,128	3.86%
Total	Paul Tonko (incumbent)	124,889	59.25%
Republican	Ted Danz	70,211	33.31%
Conservative	Ted Danz	15,541	7.37%
Total	Ted Danz	85,752	40.68%
Write-in		150	0.07%
Total votes		210,791	100
Democratic hold			

US House election, 2012: New York District 20
Party	Candidate	Votes	%
Democratic	Paul Tonko	181,093	60.91%
Working Families	Paul Tonko	12,017	4.04%
Independence	Paul Tonko	10,291	3.46%
Total	Paul Tonko (incumbent)	203,401	68.41%
Republican	Robert Dieterich	79,102	26.61%
Conservative	Robert Dieterich	14,676	4.94%
Total	Robert Dieterich	93,778	31.54%
Write-in		135	0.05%
Total votes		297,314	100
Democratic hold			

US House election, 2014: New York District 20
Party	Candidate	Votes	%
Democratic	Paul Tonko	103,437	50.62%
Working Families	Paul Tonko	11,285	5.52%
Independence	Paul Tonko	10,389	5.08%
Total	Paul Tonko (incumbent)	125,111	61.23%
Republican	James Fischer	61,820	30.26%
Conservative	James Fischer	17,284	8.46%
Total	James Fischer	79,104	38.71%
Write-in		114	0.06%
Total votes		204,329	100
Democratic hold			

US House election, 2016: New York District 20
Party	Candidate	Votes	%
Democratic	Paul Tonko	188,426	60.02%
Working Families	Paul Tonko	10,929	3.48%
Independence	Paul Tonko	10,626	3.38%
Women's Equality	Paul Tonko	3,037	0.97%
Total	Paul Tonko (incumbent)	213,018	67.85%
Republican	Joe Vitollo	83,321	26.54%
Conservative	Joe Vitollo	15,911	5.07%
Reform	Joe Vitollo	1,508	0.48%
Total	Joe Vitollo	100,740	32.09%
Write-in		181	0.06%
Total votes		313,939	100
Democratic hold			

US House election, 2018: New York District 20
Party	Candidate	Votes	%
Democratic	Paul Tonko	161,330	60.65%
Working Families	Paul Tonko	10,129	3.81%
Women's Equality	Paul Tonko	3,712	1.40%
Reform	Paul Tonko	1,640	0.62%
Total	Paul Tonko (incumbent)	176,811	66.47%
Republican	Joe Vitollo	89,058	33.48%
Write-in		145	0.05%
Total votes		266,014	100
Democratic hold			

US House election, 2020: New York District 20
Party	Candidate	Votes	%
Democratic	Paul Tonko	194,071	54.01%
Working Families	Paul Tonko	19,678	5.48%
Independence	Paul Tonko	5,956	1.66%
Total	Paul Tonko (incumbent)	219,705	61.14%
Republican	Liz Joy	120,839	33.63%
Conservative	Liz Joy	17,849	4.97%
SAM	Liz Joy	758	0.21%
Total	Liz Joy	139,446	38.81%
Write-in		191	0.05%
Total votes		359,342	100
Democratic hold			

US House election, 2022: New York District 20
Primary election
Party	Candidate	Votes	%
Democratic	Paul Tonko (incumbent)	18,251	88.28%
Democratic	Rostov Rar	2,422	11.72%
Total votes		20,673	100
General election
Democratic	Paul Tonko	145,928	50.07%
Working Families	Paul Tonko	14,492	4.97%
Total	Paul Tonko (incumbent)	160,420	55.05%
Republican	Liz Joy	110,903	38.05%
Conservative	Liz Joy	19,966	6.85%
Total	Liz Joy	130,869	44.91%
Write-in		144	0.05%
Total votes		291,433	100
Democratic hold			

US House election, 2024: New York District 20
Party	Candidate	Votes	%
Democratic	Paul Tonko	200,354	55.13%
Working Families	Paul Tonko	21,643	5.95%
Total	Paul Tonko (incumbent)	221,997	61.08%
Republican	Kevin Waltz	121,609	33.46%
Conservative	Kevin Waltz	19,542	5.38%
Total	Kevin Waltz	141,151	38.84%
Write-in		297	0.08%
Total votes		363,445	100
Democratic hold			

== See also ==
- Energy law

U.S. House of Representatives
Preceded by Michael McNulty	Member of the U.S. House of Representatives from New York's 21st congressional district 2009–2013	Succeeded by Bill Owens
Preceded by Chris Gibson	Member of the U.S. House of Representatives from New York's 20th congressional district 2013–present	Incumbent
U.S. order of precedence (ceremonial)
Preceded by Glenn Thompson	United States representatives by seniority 71st	Succeeded by Mike Quigley
