= 2020 United States House of Representatives elections =

House elections for the 117th U.S. Congress

- November 3, 2020

All 435 seats in the United States House of Representatives (Note: As well as the 6 non-voting delegates.) 218 seats needed for a majority
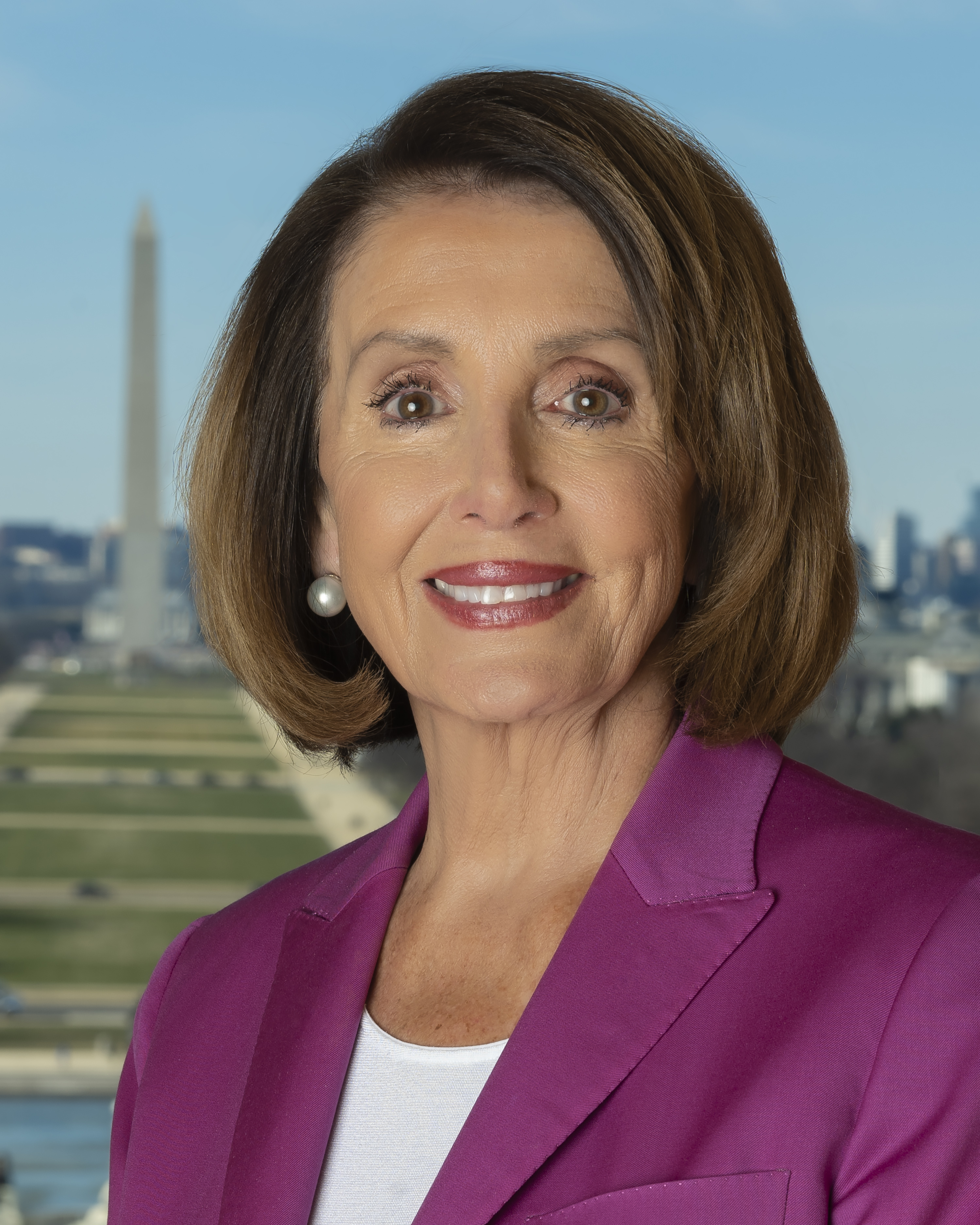

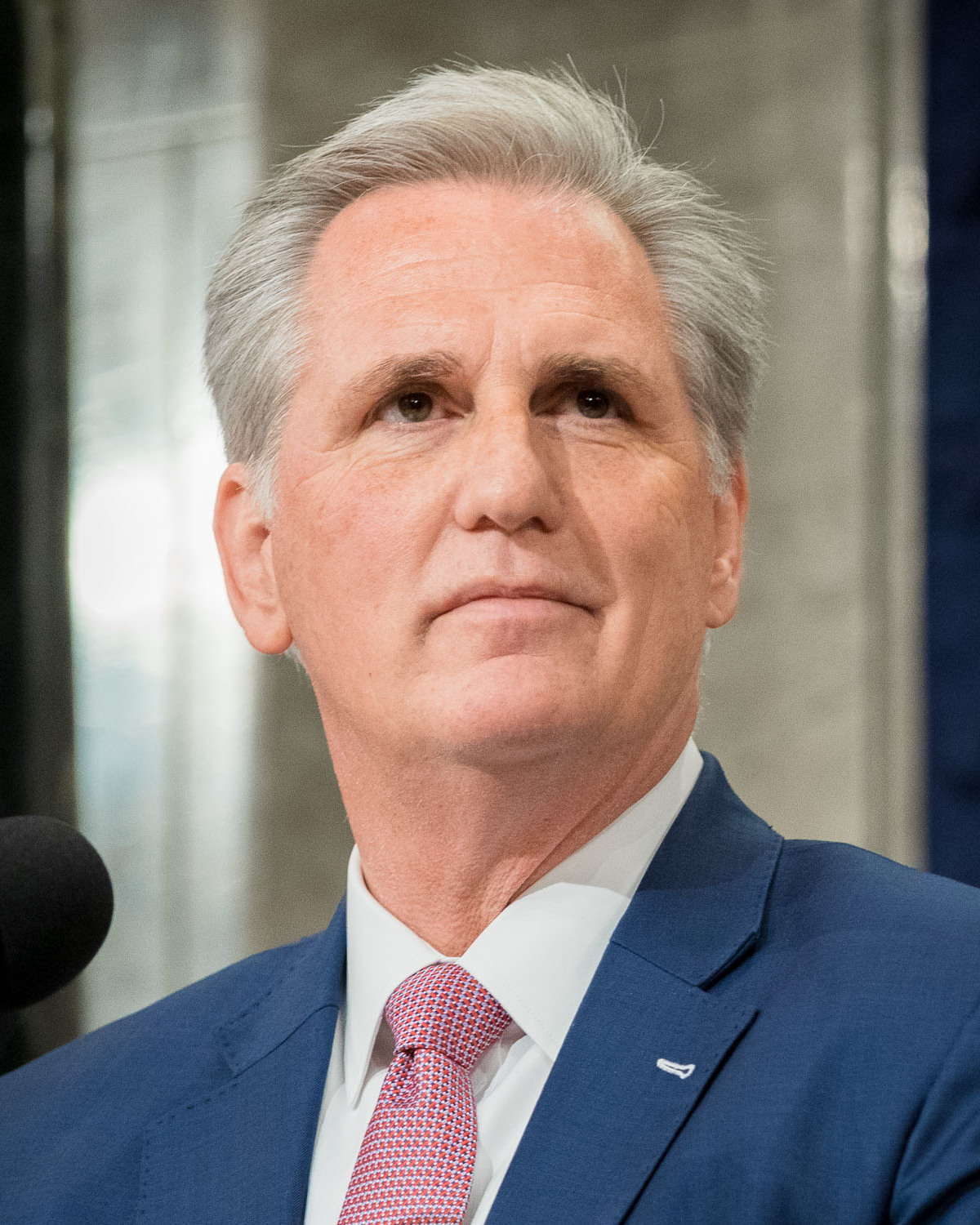
	Majority party	Minority party
Leader	Nancy Pelosi	Kevin McCarthy
Party	Democratic	Republican
Leader since	January 3, 2003	January 3, 2019
Leader's seat	California 12th	California 23rd
Last election	235 seats, 53.4%	200 seats, 44.8%
Seats before	232	197
Seats won	222	213
Seat change	▼13	▲14
Popular vote	77,122,690	72,466,576
Percentage	50.3%	47.2%
Swing	▼3.1pp	▲2.4pp
	Third party
Party	Libertarian
Last election	0 Seats 0.7%
Seats before	1
Seats won	0
Seat change	▼1
Popular vote	1,100,639
Percentage	0.7%
Swing	0.0pp
- Results: Democratic hold Democratic gain Republican hold Republican gain
Speaker before election
Nancy Pelosi
Democratic
Elected Speaker
Nancy Pelosi
Democratic

The 2020 United States House of Representatives elections were held on November 3, 2020, to elect representatives from all 435 congressional districts across each of the 50 U.S. states to the 117th United States Congress, as well as six non-voting delegates from the District of Columbia and the inhabited U.S. territories. Special House elections were also held on various dates throughout 2020. It coincided with the presidential election, ousting sitting president Donald J. Trump and electing former vice president Joe Biden.

In the 2018 United States House of Representatives elections, the Democrats had won 235 seats. Leading up to the 2020 elections, the Democrats were projected by many polls to expand their majority by up to 15 seats due to the unpopularity of then-President Donald Trump. While Democrats ultimately retained control of the House following the 2020 elections, Republicans made a net gain of 13 seats to the surprise of most observers and the Democrats entered 2021 with a narrow 222–213 House majority. This was the first time since 2004 that the Republican Party made net gains in the House during a presidential election year. This led to Democrats' smallest majority since 1942.

Republicans exceeded expectations in the 2020 House elections. They won back a number of seats that they lost in 2018 while successfully defending competitive seats that Democrats had hoped to flip. No Republican incumbent was defeated for re-election, while 13 incumbent Democrats were ousted by Republicans; also, several successful Democratic candidates won by smaller-than-expected margins. Many have cited Trump's presence on the ballot as having fueled high Republican turnout, while others have emphasized the Republican Party's efforts to promote their female and minority candidates.

== Electoral system ==
Forty-seven states used the first-past-the-post voting plurality system to elect their representatives. Instant-runoff voting was used in one state (Maine) and a runoff system was used in two states (Georgia and Louisiana).

== Results summary ==
=== Federal ===
The 2020 election results are compared below to the November 2018 election, in which only 434 seats were filled (the election results in one constituency were voided). The results summary below does not include blank and over/under votes which were included in the official results.

↓
222	213
Democratic	Republican

Parties	Popular vote			Seats			
Parties	Vote	%	Change	2018	2020	+/−	Strength
Democratic Party	77,122,690	50.27%	–3.1%	235	222	▼13	51.0%
Republican Party	72,466,576	47.23%	+2.4%	199	213	▲14	49.0%
Libertarian Party	1,100,639	0.72%	–	—	—	—	—
Independent	431,984	0.28%	–0.2%	—	—	—	—
Green Party	90,121	0.06%	–0.1%	—	—	—	—
Constitution Party	77,848	0.05%	–	—	—	—	—
Other parties	1,982,993	1.29%	+1.3%	—	—	—	—
Write-ins	158,554	0.10%	+0.1%	—	—	—	—
Totals	153,431,405	100.0%	—	434	435	▲1	100.0%
Source: Election Statistics – Office of the Clerk

=== Per states ===
State	Total seats	Democratic		Republican	
State	Total seats	Seats	Change	Seats	Change
Alabama	7	1	Steady	6	Steady
Alaska	1	0	Steady	1	Steady
Arizona	9	5	Steady	4	Steady
Arkansas	4	0	Steady	4	Steady
California	53	42	▼4	11	▲4
Colorado	7	4	Steady	3	Steady
Connecticut	5	5	Steady	0	Steady
Delaware	1	1	Steady	0	Steady
Florida	27	11	▼2	16	▲2
Georgia	14	6	▲1	8	▼1
Hawaii	2	2	Steady	0	Steady
Idaho	2	0	Steady	2	Steady
Illinois	18	13	Steady	5	Steady
Indiana	9	2	Steady	7	Steady
Iowa	4	1	▼2	3	▲2
Kansas	4	1	Steady	3	Steady
Kentucky	6	1	Steady	5	Steady
Louisiana	6	1	Steady	5	Steady
Maine	2	2	Steady	0	Steady
Maryland	8	7	Steady	1	Steady
Massachusetts	9	9	Steady	0	Steady
Michigan	14	7	Steady	7	▲1
Minnesota	8	4	▼1	4	▲1
Mississippi	4	1	Steady	3	Steady
Missouri	8	2	Steady	6	Steady
Montana	1	0	Steady	1	Steady
Nebraska	3	0	Steady	3	Steady
Nevada	4	3	Steady	1	Steady
New Hampshire	2	2	Steady	0	Steady
New Jersey	12	10	▼1	2	▲1
New Mexico	3	2	▼1	1	▲1
New York	27	19	▼2	8	▲2
North Carolina	13	5	▲2	8	▼2
North Dakota	1	0	Steady	1	Steady
Ohio	16	4	Steady	12	Steady
Oklahoma	5	0	▼1	5	▲1
Oregon	5	4	Steady	1	Steady
Pennsylvania	18	9	Steady	9	Steady
Rhode Island	2	2	Steady	0	Steady
South Carolina	7	1	▼1	6	▲1
South Dakota	1	0	Steady	1	Steady
Tennessee	9	2	Steady	7	Steady
Texas	36	13	Steady	23	Steady
Utah	4	0	▼1	4	▲1
Vermont	1	1	Steady	0	Steady
Virginia	11	7	Steady	4	Steady
Washington	10	7	Steady	3	Steady
West Virginia	3	0	Steady	3	Steady
Wisconsin	8	3	Steady	5	Steady
Wyoming	1	0	Steady	1	Steady
Total	435	222	▼13	213	▲14

Popular vote
Democratic	50.81%
Republican	47.69%
Libertarian	0.72%
Green	0.06%
Other	0.72%

House seats
Democratic	51.0%
Republican	49.0%

=== Maps ===
House seats by party holding majority in state

Cartogram of results

Popular vote by states

Results by margin

== Retirements ==
Retiring incumbents by district Democratic incumbent ran Democratic incumbent retired or lost renomination Republican incumbent ran Republican incumbent retired or lost renomination Libertarian incumbent retired Vacant district

36 incumbents did not seek re-election, either to retire or to seek other positions.

=== Democrats ===
Nine Democrats did not seek re-election.

1. California 53: Susan Davis retired.
2. Hawaii 2: Tulsi Gabbard retired to run for U.S. president.
3. Indiana 1: Pete Visclosky retired.
4. Iowa 2: Dave Loebsack retired.
5. Massachusetts 4: Joe Kennedy III retired to run for the U.S. Senate.
6. New Mexico 3: Ben Ray Luján retired to run for the U.S. Senate.
7. New York 15: José Serrano retired.
8. New York 17: Nita Lowey retired.
9. Washington 10: Denny Heck retired to run for lieutenant governor of Washington.

=== Libertarians ===
One Libertarian did not seek re-election.

1. Michigan 3: Justin Amash retired.

=== Republicans ===
26 Republicans did not seek re-election.

1. Alabama 1: Bradley Byrne retired the run for the U.S. Senate.
2. Alabama 2: Martha Roby retired.
3. California 8: Paul Cook retired to run for San Bernardino County supervisor.
4. Florida 3: Ted Yoho retired.
5. Florida 19: Francis Rooney retired.
6. Georgia 7: Rob Woodall retired.
7. Georgia 9: Doug Collins retired to run for the U.S. Senate.
8. Illinois 15: John Shimkus retired.
9. Indiana 5: Susan Brooks retired.
10. Kansas 1: Roger Marshall retired to run for the U.S. Senate.
11. Louisiana 5: Ralph Abraham retired.
12. Michigan 10: Paul Mitchell retired.
13. Montana at-large: Greg Gianforte retired to run for governor of Montana.
14. New York 2: Peter T. King retired.
15. North Carolina 2: George Holding retired due to court ordered redistricting.
16. North Carolina 6: Mark Walker retired due to court ordered redistricting.
17. Oregon 2: Greg Walden retired.
18. Tennessee 1: Phil Roe retired.
19. Texas 11: Mike Conaway retired.
20. Texas 13: Mac Thornberry retired.
21. Texas 17: Bill Flores retired.
22. Texas 22: Pete Olson retired.
23. Texas 23: Will Hurd retired.
24. Texas 24: Kenny Marchant retired.
25. Utah 1: Rob Bishop retired to run for lieutenant governor of Utah.
26. Wisconsin 5: Jim Sensenbrenner retired.

== Resignations ==
Four incumbents resigned in 2020, all of them Republicans, with no special elections to fill the vacant seats before the November election.

=== Republicans ===
1. California 50: Duncan Hunter resigned January 13 after pleading guilty to one count of misusing campaign funds. Seat won by Republican Darrell Issa.
2. Georgia 14: Tom Graves resigned October 4; he had initially planned to retire at the end of the term. Seat won by Republican Marjorie Taylor Greene.
3. North Carolina 11: Mark Meadows resigned March 30 to become White House Chief of Staff. Seat won by Republican Madison Cawthorn.
4. Texas 4: John Ratcliffe resigned May 22 to become Director of National Intelligence. Seat won by Republican Pat Fallon.

== Incumbents defeated ==
=== In primary elections ===
Eight incumbents lost renomination in 2020, the most in a non-redistricting year since 1974.

==== Democrats ====
Three Democrats lost renomination.

1. Illinois 3: Dan Lipinski lost renomination to Marie Newman, who went on to win the general election.
2. Missouri 1: Lacy Clay lost renomination to Cori Bush, who went on to win the general election.
3. New York 16: Eliot Engel lost renomination to Jamaal Bowman, who went on to win the general election.

==== Republicans ====
Five Republicans lost renomination.

1. Colorado 3: Scott Tipton lost renomination to Lauren Boebert, who won the general election.
2. Florida 15: Ross Spano lost renomination to Scott Franklin, who won the general election.
3. Iowa 4: Steve King lost renomination to Randy Feenstra, who won the general election.
4. Kansas 2: Steve Watkins lost renomination to Jake LaTurner, who won the general election.
5. Virginia 5: Denver Riggleman lost renomination in a district convention to Bob Good, who won the general election.

=== In general elections ===
==== Democrats ====
Thirteen Democrats, twelve of whom were freshmen, lost re-election to Republicans.

1. California 21: TJ Cox (first elected in 2018) lost to David Valadao.
2. California 39: Gil Cisneros (first elected in 2018) lost to Young Kim.
3. California 48: Harley Rouda (first elected in 2018) lost to Michelle Steel.
4. Florida 26: Debbie Mucarsel-Powell (first elected in 2018) lost to Carlos Giménez.
5. Florida 27: Donna Shalala (first elected in 2018) lost to Maria Elvira Salazar.
6. Iowa 1: Abby Finkenauer (first elected in 2018) lost to Ashley Hinson.
7. Minnesota 7: Collin Peterson (first elected in 1990) lost to Michelle Fischbach.
8. New Mexico 2: Xochitl Torres Small (first elected in 2018) lost to Yvette Herrell.
9. New York 11: Max Rose (first elected in 2018) lost to Nicole Malliotakis.
10. New York 22: Anthony Brindisi (first elected in 2018) lost to Claudia Tenney.
11. Oklahoma 5: Kendra Horn (first elected in 2018) lost to Stephanie Bice.
12. South Carolina 1: Joe Cunningham (first elected in 2018) lost to Nancy Mace.
13. Utah 4: Ben McAdams (first elected in 2018) lost to Burgess Owens.

==== Republicans ====
No Republicans lost re-election.

== Open seats that changed parties ==
=== Democratic seats won by Republicans ===
One Democratic seat was won by a Republican.

1. Iowa 2: Won by Mariannette Miller-Meeks.

=== Libertarian seats won by Republicans ===
One Libertarian seat was won by a Republican.

1. Michigan 3: Won by Peter Meijer.

=== Republican seats won by Democrats ===
Three Republican seats were won by Democrats.

1. Georgia 7: Won by Carolyn Bourdeaux.
2. North Carolina 2: Won by Deborah K. Ross.
3. North Carolina 6: Won by Kathy Manning.

== Open seats that parties held ==
=== Democratic seats held by Democrats ===
Democrats held twelve of their open seats.

1. California 53: Won by Sara Jacobs
2. Georgia 5: Won by Nikema Williams
3. Hawaii 2: Won by Kai Kahele
4. Illinois 3: Won by Marie Newman
5. Indiana 1: Won by Frank J. Mrvan
6. Massachusetts 4: Won by Jake Auchincloss
7. Missouri 1: Won by Cori Bush
8. New Mexico 3: Won by Teresa Leger Fernandez
9. New York 15: Won by Ritchie Torres
10. New York 16: Won by Jamaal Bowman
11. New York 17: Won by Mondaire Jones
12. Washington 10: Won by Marilyn Strickland

=== Republican seats held by Republicans ===
Republicans held thirty-two of their open seats.

1. Alabama 1: Won by Jerry Carl
2. Alabama 2: Won by Barry Moore
3. California 8: Won by Jay Obernolte
4. California 50: Won by Darrell Issa
5. Colorado 3: Won by Lauren Boebert
6. Florida 3: Won by Kat Cammack
7. Florida 15: Won by Scott Franklin
8. Florida 19: Won by Byron Donalds
9. Georgia 9: Won by Andrew Clyde
10. Georgia 14: Won by Marjorie Taylor Greene
11. Illinois 15: Won by Mary Miller
12. Indiana 5: Won by Victoria Spartz
13. Iowa 4: Won by Randy Feenstra
14. Kansas 1: Won by Tracey Mann
15. Kansas 2: Won by Jake LaTurner
16. Louisiana 5: Won by Luke Letlow (Note: Letlow died from COVID-19 on December 29, 2020 before taking office.)
17. Michigan 10: Won by Lisa McClain
18. Montana at-large: Won by Matt Rosendale
19. New York 2: Won by Andrew Garbarino
20. North Carolina 11: Won by Madison Cawthorn
21. Oregon 2: Won by Cliff Bentz
22. Tennessee 1: Won by Diana Harshbarger
23. Texas 4: Won by Pat Fallon
24. Texas 11: Won by August Pfluger
25. Texas 13: Won by Ronny Jackson
26. Texas 17: Won by Pete Sessions
27. Texas 22: Won by Troy Nehls
28. Texas 23: Won by Tony Gonzales
29. Texas 24: Won by Beth Van Duyne
30. Utah 1: Won by Blake Moore
31. Virginia 5: Won by Bob Good
32. Wisconsin 5: Won by Scott L. Fitzgerald

== Crossover seats ==
This is a list of congressional seats that voted for one party in the 2020 presidential election and another in the 2020 House elections.

=== Democratic ===
Seven districts were won by Donald Trump in the presidential election and Democrats in the House elections:

District			Incumbent	
Location	2018 PVI	Member	Party	First elected
Iowa 3	R+1	Cindy Axne	Democratic	2018
Illinois 17	D+3	Cheri Bustos	Democratic	2012
Maine 2	R+2	Jared Golden	Democratic	2018
Michigan 8	R+4	Elissa Slotkin	Democratic	2018
New Jersey 3	R+2	Andy Kim	Democratic	2018
Pennsylvania 8	R+1	Matt Cartwright	Democratic	2012
Wisconsin 3	EVEN	Ron Kind	Democratic	1996

=== Republican ===
Nine districts were won by Joe Biden in the presidential election and Republicans in the House elections:

District			Incumbent	
Location	2018 PVI	Member	Party	First elected
California 21	D+5	David Valadao	Republican	2012; 2018 (lost); 2020
California 25	D+3	Mike Garcia	Republican	2020 (special)
California 39	EVEN	Young Kim	Republican	2020
California 48	R+4	Michelle Steel	Republican	2020
Florida 27	D+5	María Elvira Salazar	Republican	2020
Nebraska 2	R+4	Don Bacon	Republican	2016
New York 24	D+3	John Katko	Republican	2014
Pennsylvania 1	R+1	Brian Fitzpatrick	Republican	2016
Texas 24	R+9	Beth Van Duyne	Republican	2020

== Closest races ==
Seventy-seven races were decided by 10% or lower.

District	Winner	Margin
Iowa 2nd	Republican (flip)	0.002%
New York 22nd	Republican (flip)	0.03%
California 25th	Republican	0.10%
California 21st	Republican (flip)	0.90%
Utah 4th	Republican (flip)	1.00%
California 39th	Republican (flip)	1.20%
New Jersey 7th	Democratic	1.22%
South Carolina 1st	Republican (flip)	1.27%
Texas 24th	Republican	1.33%
Illinois 14th	Democratic	1.34%
Iowa 3rd	Democratic	1.39%
Virginia 7th	Democratic	1.82%
California 48th	Republican (flip)	2.12%
Minnesota 2nd	Democratic	2.26% (Note: This seat was the tipping point seat for a Democratic majority.)
Pennsylvania 17th	Democratic	2.30%
Michigan 11th	Democratic	2.38%
Iowa 1st	Republican (flip)	2.60%
Wisconsin 3rd	Democratic	2.66%
Florida 27th	Republican (flip)	2.74%
Georgia 7th	Democratic (flip)	2.78%
Texas 15th	Democratic	2.88%
Nevada 3rd	Democratic	2.98%
Minnesota 1st	Republican	3.07%
Arizona 1st	Democratic	3.22%
Texas 7th	Democratic	3.34%
Florida 26th	Republican (flip)	3.45%
Pennsylvania 8th	Democratic	3.55%
Washington 8th	Democratic	3.57%
Michigan 8th	Democratic	3.60%
Pennsylvania 7th	Democratic	3.73%
Texas 23rd	Republican	3.96%
Illinois 17th	Democratic	4.05%
Indiana 5th	Republican	4.08%
Oklahoma 5th	Republican (flip)	4.12%
Arizona 6th	Republican	4.35%
Nebraska 2nd	Republican	4.56%
Nevada 4th	Democratic	4.87%
New Hampshire 1st	Democratic	5.11%
Virginia 5th	Republican	5.13%
Oregon 4th	Democratic	5.32%
Virginia 2nd	Democratic	5.74%
New Jersey 2nd	Republican	5.76%
Michigan 3rd	Republican (flip)	5.92%
California 34th	Democratic	5.96% (Note: Under California's "jungle primary" system, the general election was between two Democrats.)
Texas 32nd	Democratic	6.02%
Florida 13th	Democratic	6.08%
Maine 2nd	Democratic	6.09%
Colorado 3rd	Republican	6.17%
California 49th	Democratic	6.26%
New York 11th	Republican (flip)	6.28%
Missouri 2nd	Republican	6.37%
North Carolina 8th	Republican	6.56%
Texas 21st	Republican	6.60%
New Jersey 11th	Democratic	6.61%
Pennsylvania 10th	Republican	6.62%
Oregon 5th	Democratic	6.74%
New York 2nd	Republican	6.91%
California 45th	Democratic	6.92%
Texas 22nd	Republican	6.93%
Texas 10th	Republican	7.13%
Ohio 1st	Republican	7.15%
New Mexico 2nd	Republican (flip)	7.31%
Illinois 6th	Democratic	7.39%
New Jersey 5th	Democratic	7.51%
Ohio 13th	Democratic	7.54%
New Jersey 3rd	Democratic	7.76%
California 50th	Republican	7.90%
North Carolina 1st	Democratic	8.36%
California 22nd	Republican	8.46%
Texas 6th	Republican	8.82%
Illinois 13th	Republican	8.92%
Puerto Rico at-large	Republican	9.01%
Alaska at-large	Republican	9.14%
Texas 31st	Republican	9.14%
Georgia 6th	Democratic	9.18%
California 3rd	Democratic	9.34%
New York 1st	Republican	9.72%

== Special elections ==
There were five special elections in 2020 to the 116th United States Congress, listed here by date and district.

District	Incumbent			This race	
District	Member	Party	First elected	Results	Candidates
Maryland 7	Elijah Cummings	Democratic	1996	Incumbent died October 17, 2019. New member elected April 28, 2020. Democratic hold.	▌ ✓ Kweisi Mfume (Democratic) 73.8%; ▌Kimberly Klacik (Republican) 25.1%
California 25	Katie Hill	Democratic	2018	Incumbent resigned November 3, 2019 amid ethics investigation. New member elected May 12, 2020 in a runoff. Republican gain.	▌ ✓ Mike Garcia (Republican) 54.9%; ▌Christy Smith (Democratic) 45.1%
Wisconsin 7	Sean Duffy	Republican	2010	Incumbent resigned September 23, 2019 for family health reasons. New member elected May 12, 2020. Republican hold.	▌ ✓ Tom Tiffany (Republican) 57.2%; ▌Tricia Zunker (Democratic) 42.8%
New York 27	Chris Collins	Republican	2012	Incumbent resigned October 1, 2019 due to federal insider trading conviction. New member elected June 23, 2020. Republican hold.	▌ ✓ Chris Jacobs (Republican) 51.8%; ▌Nate McMurray (Democratic) 46.6%
Georgia 5	John Lewis	Democratic	1986	Incumbent died July 17, 2020. New member elected December 1, 2020 after no candidate received a majority vote in the September 29, 2020 blanket primary. Democratic hold.	▌ ✓ Kwanza Hall (Democratic) 54.3%; ▌Robert Michael Franklin Jr. (Democratic) 45.7%

== Election dates ==
These are the election dates for the regularly scheduled general elections.

State or territory	Filing deadline	Primary election	Primary run-off (if necessary)	General election	Poll closing (Eastern Time)
Alabama	November 8, 2019	March 3, 2020	July 14, 2020	November 3, 2020	8:00pm
Alaska	June 1, 2020	August 18, 2020	N/A	November 3, 2020	1:00am
Arizona	April 6, 2020	August 4, 2020	N/A	November 3, 2020	9:00pm
Arkansas	November 12, 2019	March 3, 2020	Not necessary	November 3, 2020	8:30pm
California	December 6, 2019	March 3, 2020	N/A	November 3, 2020	11:00pm
Colorado	March 17, 2020	June 30, 2020	N/A	November 3, 2020	9:00pm
Connecticut	June 9, 2020	August 11, 2020	N/A	November 3, 2020	8:00pm
Delaware	July 14, 2020	September 15, 2020	N/A	November 3, 2020	8:00pm
Florida	April 24, 2020	August 18, 2020	N/A	November 3, 2020	7:00pm (Note: Polling locations in the Florida Panhandle that are in the Central Time Zone close at 8:00pm Eastern.)
Georgia	March 6, 2020	June 9, 2020	August 11, 2020	November 3, 2020	7:00pm
Hawaii	June 2, 2020	August 8, 2020	N/A	November 3, 2020	11:00pm
Idaho	March 13, 2020	June 2, 2020	N/A	November 3, 2020	10:00pm
Illinois	December 2, 2019	March 17, 2020	N/A	November 3, 2020	8:00pm
Indiana	February 7, 2020	June 2, 2020	N/A	November 3, 2020	6:00pm
Iowa	March 13, 2020	June 2, 2020	N/A	November 3, 2020	10:00pm
Kansas	June 1, 2020	August 4, 2020	N/A	November 3, 2020	9:00pm
Kentucky	January 10, 2020	June 23, 2020	N/A	November 3, 2020	7:00pm
Louisiana	July 24, 2020	November 3, 2020	N/A	December 5, 2020 (Note: Due to the primary system used in Louisiana, a December 5 runoff election determined the winner of any race where no candidate received more than 50% of the vote on November 3, 2020.)	9:00pm
Maine	March 16, 2020	July 14, 2020	N/A	November 3, 2020	8:00pm
Maryland	January 24, 2020	June 2, 2020	N/A	November 3, 2020	8:00pm
Massachusetts	May 5, 2020	September 1, 2020	N/A	November 3, 2020	8:00pm
Michigan	May 8, 2020	August 4, 2020	N/A	November 3, 2020	8:00pm
Minnesota	June 2, 2020	August 11, 2020	N/A	November 3, 2020	9:00pm
Mississippi	January 10, 2020	March 10, 2020	June 23, 2020	November 3, 2020	8:00pm
Missouri	March 31, 2020	August 4, 2020	N/A	November 3, 2020	8:00pm
Montana	March 9, 2020	June 2, 2020	N/A	November 3, 2020	10:00pm
Nebraska	March 2, 2020	May 12, 2020	N/A	November 3, 2020	9:00pm
Nevada	March 13, 2020	June 9, 2020	N/A	November 3, 2020	10:00pm
New Hampshire	June 12, 2020	September 8, 2020	N/A	November 3, 2020	8:00pm
New Jersey	March 30, 2020	July 7, 2020	N/A	November 3, 2020	8:00pm
New Mexico	March 10, 2020	June 2, 2020	N/A	November 3, 2020	9:00pm
New York	April 2, 2020	June 23, 2020	N/A	November 3, 2020	9:00pm
North Carolina	December 20, 2019	March 3, 2020	June 23, 2020	November 3, 2020	7:30pm
North Dakota	April 6, 2020	June 9, 2020	N/A	November 3, 2020	10:00pm
Ohio	December 18, 2019	April 28, 2020	N/A	November 3, 2020	7:30pm
Oklahoma	April 10, 2020	June 30, 2020	August 25, 2020	November 3, 2020	8:00pm
Oregon	March 10, 2020	May 19, 2020	N/A	November 3, 2020	10:00pm
Pennsylvania	February 18, 2020	June 2, 2020	N/A	November 3, 2020	8:00pm
Rhode Island	June 24, 2020	September 8, 2020	N/A	November 3, 2020	8:00pm
South Carolina	March 30, 2020	June 9, 2020	Not necessary	November 3, 2020	7:00pm
South Dakota	March 31, 2020	June 2, 2020	Not necessary	November 3, 2020	8:00pm
Tennessee	April 2, 2020	August 6, 2020	N/A	November 3, 2020	8:00pm
Texas	December 9, 2019	March 3, 2020	July 14, 2020	November 3, 2020	8:00pm
Utah	March 19, 2020	June 30, 2020	N/A	November 3, 2020	10:00pm
Vermont	May 28, 2020	August 11, 2020	N/A	November 3, 2020	7:00pm
Virginia	March 26, 2020	June 23, 2020	N/A	November 3, 2020	7:00pm
Washington	May 15, 2020	August 4, 2020	N/A	November 3, 2020	11:00pm
West Virginia	January 25, 2020	June 9, 2020	N/A	November 3, 2020	7:30pm
Wisconsin	June 1, 2020	August 11, 2020	N/A	November 3, 2020	9:00pm
Wyoming	May 29, 2020	August 18, 2020	N/A	November 3, 2020	9:00pm
District of Columbia	March 21, 2020	June 2, 2020	N/A	November 3, 2020	8:00pm
American Samoa	September 1, 2020	N/A	N/A	November 3, 2020	3:00am
Guam	June 30, 2020	November 3, 2020 (Note: Because of the COVID-19 pandemic, Guam cancelled its August 29, 2020, primary elections. All three certified candidates appeared on the November 3, 2020 ballot with a runoff held on November 17, 2020.)	N/A	November 17, 2020	5:00am
Northern Mariana Islands	August 5, 2020	N/A	N/A	November 3, 2020	5:00am
Puerto Rico	January 5, 2020	August 16, 2020 (Note: Because of a lack of ballots at about half of Puerto Rico's 110 voting locations, the August 9 primaries were suspended until August 16.)	N/A	November 3, 2020	4:00pm
U.S. Virgin Islands	May 12, 2020	August 1, 2020	N/A	November 3, 2020	6:00pm

== Alabama ==
Alabama's results

District		Incumbent			This race	
Location	PVI	Member	Party	First elected	Results	Candidates
Alabama 1	R+15	Bradley Byrne	Republican	2013 (special)	Incumbent retired to run for U.S. senator. Republican hold.	▌ ✓ Jerry Carl (Republican) 64.4%; ▌James Averhart (Democratic) 35.5%
Alabama 2	R+16	Martha Roby	Republican	2010	Incumbent retired. Republican hold.	▌ ✓ Barry Moore (Republican) 65.2%; ▌Phyllis Harvey-Hall (Democratic) 34.7%
Alabama 3	R+16	Mike D. Rogers	Republican	2002	Incumbent re-elected.	▌ ✓ Mike D. Rogers (Republican) 67.5%; ▌Adia Winfrey (Democratic) 32.5%
Alabama 4	R+30	Robert Aderholt	Republican	1996	Incumbent re-elected.	▌ ✓ Robert Aderholt (Republican) 82.2%; ▌Rick Neighbors (Democratic) 17.7%
Alabama 5	R+18	Mo Brooks	Republican	2010	Incumbent re-elected.	▌ ✓ Mo Brooks (Republican) 95.8%
Alabama 6	R+26	Gary Palmer	Republican	2014	Incumbent re-elected.	▌ ✓ Gary Palmer (Republican) 97.1%
Alabama 7	D+20	Terri Sewell	Democratic	2010	Incumbent re-elected.	▌ ✓ Terri Sewell (Democratic) 97.2%

== Alaska ==
Alaska's result by state house district

District		Incumbent			This race	
Location	PVI	Member	Party	First elected	Results	Candidates
Alaska at-large	R+9	Don Young	Republican	1973 (special)	Incumbent re-elected.	▌ ✓ Don Young (Republican) 54.4%; ▌Alyse Galvin (Independent) 45.3%

== Arizona ==
Arizona's results

District		Incumbent			This race	
Location	PVI	Member	Party	First elected	Results	Candidates
Arizona 1	R+2	Tom O'Halleran	Democratic	2016	Incumbent re-elected.	▌ ✓ Tom O'Halleran (Democratic) 51.6%; ▌Tiffany Shedd (Republican) 48.4%
Arizona 2	R+1	Ann Kirkpatrick	Democratic	2008; 2010 (lost); 2012; 2016 (retired); 2018	Incumbent re-elected.	▌ ✓ Ann Kirkpatrick (Democratic) 55.1%; ▌Brandon Martin (Republican) 44.9%
Arizona 3	D+13	Raúl Grijalva	Democratic	2002	Incumbent re-elected.	▌ ✓ Raúl Grijalva (Democratic) 64.6%; ▌Daniel Wood (Republican) 35.4%
Arizona 4	R+21	Paul Gosar	Republican	2010	Incumbent re-elected.	▌ ✓ Paul Gosar (Republican) 69.7%; ▌Delina DiSanto (Democratic) 30.2%
Arizona 5	R+15	Andy Biggs	Republican	2016	Incumbent re-elected.	▌ ✓ Andy Biggs (Republican) 58.9%; ▌Joan Greene (Democratic) 41.1%
Arizona 6	R+9	David Schweikert	Republican	2010	Incumbent re-elected.	▌ ✓ David Schweikert (Republican) 52.2%; ▌Hiral Tipirneni (Democratic) 47.8%
Arizona 7	D+23	Ruben Gallego	Democratic	2014	Incumbent re-elected.	▌ ✓ Ruben Gallego (Democratic) 76.7%; ▌Joshua Barnett (Republican) 23.3%
Arizona 8	R+13	Debbie Lesko	Republican	2018 (special)	Incumbent re-elected.	▌ ✓ Debbie Lesko (Republican) 59.6%; ▌Michael Muscato (Democratic) 40.4%
Arizona 9	D+4	Greg Stanton	Democratic	2018	Incumbent re-elected.	▌ ✓ Greg Stanton (Democratic) 61.6%; ▌Dave Giles (Republican) 38.4%

== Arkansas ==
Arkansas's results

District		Incumbent			This race	
Location	PVI	Member	Party	First elected	Results	Candidates
Arkansas 1	R+17	Rick Crawford	Republican	2010	Incumbent re-elected.	▌ ✓ Rick Crawford (Republican) 100.0%
Arkansas 2	R+7	French Hill	Republican	2014	Incumbent re-elected.	▌ ✓ French Hill (Republican) 55.4%; ▌Joyce Elliott (Democratic) 44.6%
Arkansas 3	R+19	Steve Womack	Republican	2010	Incumbent re-elected.	▌ ✓ Steve Womack (Republican) 64.3%; ▌Celeste Williams (Democratic) 31.8%; ▌Michael Kalagias (Libertarian) 3.9%
Arkansas 4	R+17	Bruce Westerman	Republican	2014	Incumbent re-elected.	▌ ✓ Bruce Westerman (Republican) 69.7%; ▌William Hanson (Democratic) 27.5%; ▌Frank Gilbert (Libertarian) 2.8%

== California ==
California's results

District		Incumbent			This race	
Location	PVI	Member	Party	First elected	Results	Candidates
California 1	R+11	Doug LaMalfa	Republican	2012	Incumbent re-elected.	▌ ✓ Doug LaMalfa (Republican) 57.0%; ▌Audrey Denney (Democratic) 43.0%
California 2	D+22	Jared Huffman	Democratic	2012	Incumbent re-elected.	▌ ✓ Jared Huffman (Democratic) 75.7%; ▌Dale Mensing (Republican) 24.3%
California 3	D+5	John Garamendi	Democratic	2009 (special)	Incumbent re-elected.	▌ ✓ John Garamendi (Democratic) 54.7%; ▌Tamika Hamilton (Republican) 45.3%
California 4	R+10	Tom McClintock	Republican	2008	Incumbent re-elected.	▌ ✓ Tom McClintock (Republican) 55.9%; ▌Brynne Kennedy (Democratic) 44.1%
California 5	D+21	Mike Thompson	Democratic	1998	Incumbent re-elected.	▌ ✓ Mike Thompson (Democratic) 76.1%; ▌Scott Giblin (Republican) 23.9%
California 6	D+21	Doris Matsui	Democratic	2005 (special)	Incumbent re-elected.	▌ ✓ Doris Matsui (Democratic) 73.3%; ▌Chris Bish (Republican) 26.7%
California 7	D+3	Ami Bera	Democratic	2012	Incumbent re-elected.	▌ ✓ Ami Bera (Democratic) 56.6%; ▌Buzz Patterson (Republican) 43.4%
California 8	R+9	Paul Cook	Republican	2012	Incumbent retired to run for San Bernardino County supervisor. Republican hold.	▌ ✓ Jay Obernolte (Republican) 56.1%; ▌Christine Bubser (Democratic) 43.9%
California 9	D+8	Jerry McNerney	Democratic	2006	Incumbent re-elected.	▌ ✓ Jerry McNerney (Democratic) 57.6%; ▌Tony Amador (Republican) 42.4%
California 10	Even	Josh Harder	Democratic	2018	Incumbent re-elected.	▌ ✓ Josh Harder (Democratic) 55.2%; ▌Ted Howze (Republican) 44.8%
California 11	D+21	Mark DeSaulnier	Democratic	2014	Incumbent re-elected.	▌ ✓ Mark DeSaulnier (Democratic) 73.0%; ▌Nisha Sharma (Republican) 27.0%
California 12	D+37	Nancy Pelosi	Democratic	1987 (special)	Incumbent re-elected.	▌ ✓ Nancy Pelosi (Democratic) 77.6%; ▌Shahid Buttar (Democratic) 22.4%
California 13	D+40	Barbara Lee	Democratic	1998 (special)	Incumbent re-elected.	▌ ✓ Barbara Lee (Democratic) 90.4%; ▌Nikka Piterman (Republican) 9.6%
California 14	D+27	Jackie Speier	Democratic	2008 (special)	Incumbent re-elected.	▌ ✓ Jackie Speier (Democratic) 79.3%; ▌Ran Petel (Republican) 20.7%
California 15	D+20	Eric Swalwell	Democratic	2012	Incumbent re-elected.	▌ ✓ Eric Swalwell (Democratic) 70.9%; ▌Alison Hayden (Republican) 29.1%
California 16	D+9	Jim Costa	Democratic	2004	Incumbent re-elected.	▌ ✓ Jim Costa (Democratic) 59.4%; ▌Kevin Cookingham (Republican) 40.6%
California 17	D+25	Ro Khanna	Democratic	2016	Incumbent re-elected.	▌ ✓ Ro Khanna (Democratic) 71.3%; ▌Ritesh Tandon (Republican) 28.7%
California 18	D+23	Anna Eshoo	Democratic	1992	Incumbent re-elected.	▌ ✓ Anna Eshoo (Democratic) 63.2%; ▌Rishi Kumar (Democratic) 36.8%
California 19	D+24	Zoe Lofgren	Democratic	1994	Incumbent re-elected.	▌ ✓ Zoe Lofgren (Democratic) 71.7%; ▌Justin Aguilera (Republican) 28.3%
California 20	D+23	Jimmy Panetta	Democratic	2016	Incumbent re-elected.	▌ ✓ Jimmy Panetta (Democratic) 76.8%; ▌Jeff Gorman (Republican) 23.2%
California 21	D+5	T.J. Cox	Democratic	2018	Incumbent lost re-election. Republican gain.	▌ ✓ David Valadao (Republican) 50.5%; ▌T.J. Cox (Democratic) 49.5%
California 22	R+8	Devin Nunes	Republican	2002	Incumbent re-elected.	▌ ✓ Devin Nunes (Republican) 54.2%; ▌Phil Arballo (Democratic) 45.8%
California 23	R+14	Kevin McCarthy	Republican	2006	Incumbent re-elected.	▌ ✓ Kevin McCarthy (Republican) 62.1%; ▌Kim Mangone (Democratic) 37.9%
California 24	D+7	Salud Carbajal	Democratic	2016	Incumbent re-elected.	▌ ✓ Salud Carbajal (Democratic) 58.7%; ▌Andy Caldwell (Republican) 41.3%
California 25	D+3	Mike Garcia	Republican	2020 (special)	Incumbent re-elected.	▌ ✓ Mike Garcia (Republican) 50.1%; ▌Christy Smith (Democratic) 49.9%
California 26	D+7	Julia Brownley	Democratic	2012	Incumbent re-elected.	▌ ✓ Julia Brownley (Democratic) 60.6%; ▌Ronda Kennedy (Republican) 39.4%
California 27	D+16	Judy Chu	Democratic	2009 (special)	Incumbent re-elected.	▌ ✓ Judy Chu (Democratic) 69.8%; ▌Johnny Nalbandian (Republican) 30.2%
California 28	D+23	Adam Schiff	Democratic	2000	Incumbent re-elected.	▌ ✓ Adam Schiff (Democratic) 72.7%; ▌Eric Early (Republican) 27.3%
California 29	D+29	Tony Cárdenas	Democratic	2012	Incumbent re-elected.	▌ ✓ Tony Cárdenas (Democratic) 56.6%; ▌Angélica Dueñas (Democratic) 43.4%
California 30	D+18	Brad Sherman	Democratic	1996	Incumbent re-elected.	▌ ✓ Brad Sherman (Democratic) 69.5%; ▌Mark Reed (Republican) 30.5%
California 31	D+8	Pete Aguilar	Democratic	2014	Incumbent re-elected.	▌ ✓ Pete Aguilar (Democratic) 61.3%; ▌Agnes Gibboney (Republican) 38.7%
California 32	D+17	Grace Napolitano	Democratic	1998	Incumbent re-elected.	▌ ✓ Grace Napolitano (Democratic) 66.6%; ▌Joshua Scott (Republican) 33.4%
California 33	D+16	Ted Lieu	Democratic	2014	Incumbent re-elected.	▌ ✓ Ted Lieu (Democratic) 67.6%; ▌James Bradley (Republican) 32.4%
California 34	D+35	Jimmy Gomez	Democratic	2017 (special)	Incumbent re-elected	▌ ✓ Jimmy Gomez (Democratic) 53.0%; ▌David Kim (Democratic) 47.0%
California 35	D+19	Norma Torres	Democratic	2014	Incumbent re-elected.	▌ ✓ Norma Torres (Democratic) 69.3%; ▌Mike Cargile (Republican) 30.7%
California 36	D+2	Raul Ruiz	Democratic	2012	Incumbent re-elected.	▌ ✓ Raul Ruiz (Democratic) 60.3%; ▌Erin Cruz (Republican) 39.7%
California 37	D+37	Karen Bass	Democratic	2010	Incumbent re-elected.	▌ ✓ Karen Bass (Democratic) 85.9%; ▌Errol Webber (Republican) 14.1%
California 38	D+17	Linda Sánchez	Democratic	2002	Incumbent re-elected.	▌ ✓ Linda Sánchez (Democratic) 74.3%; ▌Michael Tolar (Democratic) 25.7%
California 39	Even	Gil Cisneros	Democratic	2018	Incumbent lost re-election. Republican gain.	▌ ✓ Young Kim (Republican) 50.6%; ▌Gil Cisneros (Democratic) 49.4%
California 40	D+33	Lucille Roybal-Allard	Democratic	1992	Incumbent re-elected.	▌ ✓ Lucille Roybal-Allard (Democratic) 72.7%; ▌Antonio Delgado (Republican) 27.3%
California 41	D+12	Mark Takano	Democratic	2012	Incumbent re-elected.	▌ ✓ Mark Takano (Democratic) 64.0%; ▌Aja Smith (Republican) 36.0%
California 42	R+9	Ken Calvert	Republican	1992	Incumbent re-elected.	▌ ✓ Ken Calvert (Republican) 57.1%; ▌Liam O'Mara (Democratic) 42.9%
California 43	D+29	Maxine Waters	Democratic	1990	Incumbent re-elected.	▌ ✓ Maxine Waters (Democratic) 71.7%; ▌Joe Collins III (Republican) 28.3%
California 44	D+35	Nanette Barragán	Democratic	2016	Incumbent re-elected.	▌ ✓ Nanette Barragán (Democratic) 67.8%; ▌Analilia Joya (Democratic) 32.2%
California 45	R+3	Katie Porter	Democratic	2018	Incumbent re-elected.	▌ ✓ Katie Porter (Democratic) 53.5%; ▌Greg Raths (Republican) 46.5%
California 46	D+15	Lou Correa	Democratic	2016	Incumbent re-elected.	▌ ✓ Lou Correa (Democratic) 68.8%; ▌James Waters (Republican) 31.2%
California 47	D+13	Alan Lowenthal	Democratic	2012	Incumbent re-elected.	▌ ✓ Alan Lowenthal (Democratic) 63.3%; ▌John Briscoe (Republican) 36.7%
California 48	R+4	Harley Rouda	Democratic	2018	Incumbent lost re-election. Republican gain.	▌ ✓ Michelle Steel (Republican) 51.1%; ▌Harley Rouda (Democratic) 48.9%
California 49	R+1	Mike Levin	Democratic	2018	Incumbent re-elected.	▌ ✓ Mike Levin (Democratic) 53.1%; ▌Brian Maryott (Republican) 46.9%
California 50	R+11	Vacant			Rep. Duncan D. Hunter (R) resigned January 13, 2020. Republican hold.	▌ ✓ Darrell Issa (Republican) 54.0%; ▌Ammar Campa-Najjar (Democratic) 46.0%
California 51	D+22	Juan Vargas	Democratic	2012	Incumbent re-elected.	▌ ✓ Juan Vargas (Democratic) 68.3%; ▌Juan Hidalgo Jr. (Republican) 31.7%
California 52	D+6	Scott Peters	Democratic	2012	Incumbent re-elected.	▌ ✓ Scott Peters (Democratic) 61.6%; ▌Jim DeBello (Republican) 38.4%
California 53	D+14	Susan Davis	Democratic	2000	Incumbent retired. Democratic hold.	▌ ✓ Sara Jacobs (Democratic) 59.5%; ▌Georgette Gómez (Democratic) 40.5%

== Colorado ==
Colorado's results

District		Incumbent			This race	
Location	PVI	Member	Party	First elected	Results	Candidates
Colorado 1	D+21	Diana DeGette	Democratic	1996	Incumbent re-elected.	▌ ✓ Diana DeGette (Democratic) 73.6%; ▌Shane Bolling (Republican) 23.5%; ▌Jan Kok (Approval Voting) 1.9%; Others: ▌Paul N. Fiorino (Unity) 0.6%; ▌Kyle Furey (Libertarian) 0.3%
Colorado 2	D+9	Joe Neguse	Democratic	2018	Incumbent re-elected.	▌ ✓ Joe Neguse (Democratic) 61.5%; ▌Charlie Winn (Republican) 35.4%; ▌Thom Atkinson (Libertarian) 2.6%; ▌Gary Swing (Unity) 0.5%
Colorado 3	R+6	Scott Tipton	Republican	2010	Incumbent lost renomination. Republican hold.	▌ ✓ Lauren Boebert (Republican) 51.4%; ▌Diane Mitsch Bush (Democratic) 45.2%; ▌John Ryan Keil (Libertarian) 2.4%; ▌Critter Milton (Unity) 1.0%
Colorado 4	R+13	Ken Buck	Republican	2014	Incumbent re-elected.	▌ ✓ Ken Buck (Republican) 60.1%; ▌Ike McCorkle (Democratic) 36.6%; ▌Bruce Griffith (Libertarian) 2.3%; ▌Laura Ireland (Unity) 1.0%
Colorado 5	R+14	Doug Lamborn	Republican	2006	Incumbent re-elected.	▌ ✓ Doug Lamborn (Republican) 57.6%; ▌Jillian Freeland (Democratic) 37.4%; ▌Ed Duffett (Libertarian) 3.4%; Others: ▌Marcus Murphy (Independent) 0.9%; ▌Rebecca Keltie (Unity) 0.8%
Colorado 6	D+2	Jason Crow	Democratic	2018	Incumbent re-elected.	▌ ✓ Jason Crow (Democratic) 57.1%; ▌Steve House (Republican) 40.0%; ▌Norm Olsen (Libertarian) 2.1%; ▌Jaimie Kulikowski (Unity) 0.9%
Colorado 7	D+6	Ed Perlmutter	Democratic	2006	Incumbent re-elected.	▌ ✓ Ed Perlmutter (Democratic) 59.1%; ▌Casper Stockham (Republican) 37.6%; ▌Ken Biles (Libertarian) 2.7%; ▌David Olszta (Unity) 0.6%

== Connecticut ==
Connecticut's results

District		Incumbent			This race	
Location	PVI	Member	Party	First elected	Results	Candidates
Connecticut 1	D+12	John B. Larson	Democratic	1998	Incumbent re-elected.	▌ ✓ John B. Larson (Democratic) 63.8%; ▌Mary Fay (Republican) 35.0%; ▌Thomas McCormick (Green) 1.3%
Connecticut 2	D+3	Joe Courtney	Democratic	2006	Incumbent re-elected.	▌ ✓ Joe Courtney (Democratic) 59.4%; ▌Justin Anderson (Republican) 38.2%; ▌Cassandra Martineau (Green) 1.3%; ▌Daniel Reale (Libertarian) 1.1%
Connecticut 3	D+9	Rosa DeLauro	Democratic	1990	Incumbent re-elected.	▌ ✓ Rosa DeLauro (Democratic) 58.7%; ▌Margaret Streicker (Republican) 39.8%; ▌Justin Paglino (Green) 1.5%
Connecticut 4	D+7	Jim Himes	Democratic	2008	Incumbent re-elected.	▌ ✓ Jim Himes (Democratic) 62.2%; ▌Jonathan Riddle (Republican) 36.3%; ▌Brian Merlen (Independent) 1.6%
Connecticut 5	D+2	Jahana Hayes	Democratic	2018	Incumbent re-elected.	▌ ✓ Jahana Hayes (Democratic) 55.1%; ▌David Sullivan (Republican) 43.5%; ▌Bruce Walczak (Independent) 1.4%

== Delaware ==
Delaware's result by county

District		Incumbent			This race	
Location	PVI	Member	Party	First elected	Results	Candidates
Delaware at-large	D+6	Lisa Blunt Rochester	Democratic	2016	Incumbent re-elected.	▌ ✓ Lisa Blunt Rochester (Democratic) 57.6%; ▌Lee Murphy (Republican) 40.2%; ▌Catherine Purcell (IPoD) 1.4%; ▌David Rogers (Libertarian) 0.8%

== Florida ==
Florida's results

District		Incumbent			This race	
Location	PVI	Member	Party	First elected	Results	Candidates
Florida 1	R+22	Matt Gaetz	Republican	2016	Incumbent re-elected.	▌ ✓ Matt Gaetz (Republican) 64.6%; ▌Phil Ehr (Democratic) 34.0%; ▌Albert Oram (Independent) 1.4%
Florida 2	R+18	Neal Dunn	Republican	2016	Incumbent re-elected.	▌ ✓ Neal Dunn (Republican) 97.9%; ▌Kim O'Connor (write-in) 2.1%
Florida 3	R+9	Ted Yoho	Republican	2012	Incumbent retired. Republican hold.	▌ ✓ Kat Cammack (Republican) 57.1%; ▌Adam Christensen (Democratic) 42.9%
Florida 4	R+17	John Rutherford	Republican	2016	Incumbent re-elected.	▌ ✓ John Rutherford (Republican) 61.1%; ▌Donna Deegan (Democratic) 38.9%
Florida 5	D+12	Al Lawson	Democratic	2016	Incumbent re-elected.	▌ ✓ Al Lawson (Democratic) 65.1%; ▌Gary Adler (Republican) 34.9%
Florida 6	R+7	Mike Waltz	Republican	2018	Incumbent re-elected.	▌ ✓ Mike Waltz (Republican) 60.6%; ▌Clint Curtis (Democratic) 39.4%
Florida 7	Even	Stephanie Murphy	Democratic	2016	Incumbent re-elected.	▌ ✓ Stephanie Murphy (Democratic) 55.3%; ▌Leo Valentín (Republican) 43.2%; ▌William Garlington (Independent) 1.4%
Florida 8	R+11	Bill Posey	Republican	2008	Incumbent re-elected.	▌ ✓ Bill Posey (Republican) 61.4%; ▌Jim Kennedy (Democratic) 38.6%
Florida 9	D+5	Darren Soto	Democratic	2016	Incumbent re-elected.	▌ ✓ Darren Soto (Democratic) 56.0%; ▌Bill Olson (Republican) 44.0%
Florida 10	D+11	Val Demings	Democratic	2016	Incumbent re-elected.	▌ ✓ Val Demings (Democratic) 63.6%; ▌Vennia Francois (Republican) 36.4%
Florida 11	R+15	Daniel Webster	Republican	2010	Incumbent re-elected.	▌ ✓ Daniel Webster (Republican) 66.7%; ▌Dana Cottrell (Democratic) 33.3%
Florida 12	R+8	Gus Bilirakis	Republican	2006	Incumbent re-elected.	▌ ✓ Gus Bilirakis (Republican) 62.9%; ▌Kimberly Walker (Democratic) 37.1%
Florida 13	D+2	Charlie Crist	Democratic	2016	Incumbent re-elected.	▌ ✓ Charlie Crist (Democratic) 53.0%; ▌Anna Paulina Luna (Republican) 47.0%
Florida 14	D+7	Kathy Castor	Democratic	2006	Incumbent re-elected.	▌ ✓ Kathy Castor (Democratic) 60.3%; ▌Christine Quinn (Republican) 39.7%
Florida 15	R+6	Ross Spano	Republican	2018	Incumbent lost renomination. Republican hold.	▌ ✓ Scott Franklin (Republican) 55.4%; ▌Alan Cohn (Democratic) 44.6%
Florida 16	R+7	Vern Buchanan	Republican	2006	Incumbent re-elected.	▌ ✓ Vern Buchanan (Republican) 55.5%; ▌Margaret Good (Democratic) 44.5%
Florida 17	R+13	Greg Steube	Republican	2018	Incumbent re-elected.	▌ ✓ Greg Steube (Republican) 64.6%; ▌Allen Ellison (Democratic) 34.1%; ▌Theodore Murray (Independent) 1.3%
Florida 18	R+5	Brian Mast	Republican	2016	Incumbent re-elected.	▌ ✓ Brian Mast (Republican) 56.3%; ▌Pam Keith (Democratic) 41.5%; ▌K. W. Miller (Independent) 2.2%
Florida 19	R+13	Francis Rooney	Republican	2016	Incumbent retired. Republican hold.	▌ ✓ Byron Donalds (Republican) 61.3%; ▌Cindy Banyai (Democratic) 38.7%
Florida 20	D+31	Alcee Hastings	Democratic	1992	Incumbent re-elected.	▌ ✓ Alcee Hastings (Democratic) 78.7%; ▌Greg Musselwhite (Republican) 21.3%
Florida 21	D+9	Lois Frankel	Democratic	2012	Incumbent re-elected.	▌ ✓ Lois Frankel (Democratic) 59.0%; ▌Laura Loomer (Republican) 39.1%; ▌Charleston Malkemus (Independent) 1.9%
Florida 22	D+6	Ted Deutch	Democratic	2010 (special)	Incumbent re-elected.	▌ ✓ Ted Deutch (Democratic) 58.6%; ▌Jim Pruden (Republican) 41.4%
Florida 23	D+11	Debbie Wasserman Schultz	Democratic	2004	Incumbent re-elected.	▌ ✓ Debbie Wasserman Schultz (Democratic) 58.2%; ▌Carla Spalding (Republican) 41.8%
Florida 24	D+34	Frederica Wilson	Democratic	2010	Incumbent re-elected.	▌ ✓ Frederica Wilson (Democratic) 75.6%; ▌Lavern Spicer (Republican) 20.4%; ▌Christine Olivo (Independent) 4.0%
Florida 25	R+4	Mario Díaz-Balart	Republican	2002	Incumbent re-elected.	▌ ✓ Mario Díaz-Balart (Republican) 100.0%
Florida 26	D+6	Debbie Mucarsel-Powell	Democratic	2018	Incumbent lost re-election. Republican gain.	▌ ✓ Carlos A. Giménez (Republican) 51.7%; ▌Debbie Mucarsel-Powell (Democratic) 48.3%
Florida 27	D+5	Donna Shalala	Democratic	2018	Incumbent lost re-election. Republican gain.	▌ ✓ María Elvira Salazar (Republican) 51.4%; ▌Donna Shalala (Democratic) 48.6%

== Georgia ==
Georgia's results

District		Incumbent			This race	
Location	PVI	Member	Party	First elected	Results	Candidates
Georgia 1	R+9	Buddy Carter	Republican	2014	Incumbent re-elected.	▌ ✓ Buddy Carter (Republican) 58.3%; ▌Joyce Griggs (Democratic) 41.7%
Georgia 2	D+6	Sanford Bishop	Democratic	1992	Incumbent re-elected.	▌ ✓ Sanford Bishop (Democratic) 59.1%; ▌Don Cole (Republican) 40.9%
Georgia 3	R+18	Drew Ferguson	Republican	2016	Incumbent re-elected.	▌ ✓ Drew Ferguson (Republican) 65.0%; ▌Val Almonord (Democratic) 35.0%
Georgia 4	D+24	Hank Johnson	Democratic	2006	Incumbent re-elected.	▌ ✓ Hank Johnson (Democratic) 80.1%; ▌Johsie Cruz (Republican) 19.9%
Georgia 5	D+34	Vacant			Rep. John Lewis (D) died July 17, 2020. Democratic hold. A different Democrat, Kwanza Hall was elected on December 1 to finish the current term.	▌ ✓ Nikema Williams (Democratic) 85.1%; ▌Angela Stanton-King (Republican) 14.9%
Georgia 6	R+8	Lucy McBath	Democratic	2018	Incumbent re-elected.	▌ ✓ Lucy McBath (Democratic) 54.6%; ▌Karen Handel (Republican) 45.4%
Georgia 7	R+9	Rob Woodall	Republican	2010	Incumbent retired. Democratic gain.	▌ ✓ Carolyn Bourdeaux (Democratic) 51.4%; ▌Rich McCormick (Republican) 48.6%
Georgia 8	R+15	Austin Scott	Republican	2010	Incumbent re-elected.	▌ ✓ Austin Scott (Republican) 64.5%; ▌Lindsay Holliday (Democratic) 35.5%
Georgia 9	R+31	Doug Collins	Republican	2012	Incumbent retired to run for U.S. senator. Republican hold.	▌ ✓ Andrew Clyde (Republican) 78.6%; ▌Devin Pandy (Democratic) 21.4%
Georgia 10	R+15	Jody Hice	Republican	2014	Incumbent re-elected.	▌ ✓ Jody Hice (Republican) 62.3%; ▌Tabitha Johnson-Green (Democratic) 37.7%
Georgia 11	R+17	Barry Loudermilk	Republican	2014	Incumbent re-elected.	▌ ✓ Barry Loudermilk (Republican) 60.4%; ▌Dana Barrett (Democratic) 39.6%
Georgia 12	R+9	Rick Allen	Republican	2014	Incumbent re-elected.	▌ ✓ Rick Allen (Republican) 58.4%; ▌Liz Johnson (Democratic) 41.6%
Georgia 13	D+20	David Scott	Democratic	2002	Incumbent re-elected.	▌ ✓ David Scott (Democratic) 77.4%; ▌Becky Hites (Republican) 22.6%
Georgia 14	R+27	Vacant			Rep. Tom Graves (R) resigned October 4, 2020. Republican hold.	▌ ✓ Marjorie Taylor Greene (Republican) 74.7%; ▌Kevin Van Ausdal (Democratic) 25.3%

== Hawaii ==
Hawaii's results

District		Incumbent			This race	
Location	PVI	Member	Party	First elected	Results	Candidates
Hawaii 1	D+17	Ed Case	Democratic	2002 (special); 2006 (retired); 2018	Incumbent re-elected.	▌ ✓ Ed Case (Democratic) 72.0%; ▌Ron Curtis (Republican) 28.0%
Hawaii 2	D+19	Tulsi Gabbard	Democratic	2012	Incumbent retired to run for U.S. president. Democratic hold.	▌ ✓ Kai Kahele (Democratic) 63.0%; ▌Joe Akana (Republican) 30.9%; ▌Michelle Tippens (Libertarian) 2.5%; ▌Jonathan Hoomanawanui (Aloha Aina) 2.4%; ▌Ron Burrus (Independent) 1.0%; ▌John Giuffre (American Shopping) 0.2%

== Idaho ==
Idaho's results

District		Incumbent			This race	
Location	PVI	Member	Party	First elected	Results	Candidates
Idaho 1	R+21	Russ Fulcher	Republican	2018	Incumbent re-elected.	▌ ✓ Russ Fulcher (Republican) 67.8%; ▌Rudy Soto (Democratic) 28.6%; ▌Joe Evans (Libertarian) 3.6%
Idaho 2	R+17	Mike Simpson	Republican	1998	Incumbent re-elected.	▌ ✓ Mike Simpson (Republican) 64.1%; ▌C. Aaron Swisher (Democratic) 31.7%; ▌Pro-Life (Constitution) 2.2%; ▌Idaho Sierra Law (Libertarian) 2.0%

== Illinois ==
Illinois's results

District		Incumbent			This race	
Location	PVI	Member	Party	First elected	Results	Candidates
Illinois 1	D+27	Bobby Rush	Democratic	1992	Incumbent re-elected.	▌ ✓ Bobby Rush (Democratic) 73.8%; ▌Philanise White (Republican) 26.2%
Illinois 2	D+29	Robin Kelly	Democratic	2013 (special)	Incumbent re-elected.	▌ ✓ Robin Kelly (Democratic) 78.8%; ▌Theresa Raborn (Republican) 21.2%
Illinois 3	D+6	Dan Lipinski	Democratic	2004	Incumbent lost renomination. Democratic hold.	▌ ✓ Marie Newman (Democratic) 56.4%; ▌Mike Fricilone (Republican) 43.6%
Illinois 4	D+33	Chuy García	Democratic	2018	Incumbent re-elected.	▌ ✓ Chuy García (Democratic) 84.0%; ▌Jesus Solorio (Republican) 16.0%
Illinois 5	D+20	Mike Quigley	Democratic	2009 (special)	Incumbent re-elected.	▌ ✓ Mike Quigley (Democratic) 70.8%; ▌Tommy Hanson (Republican) 26.6%; ▌Thomas Wilda (Green) 2.6%
Illinois 6	R+2	Sean Casten	Democratic	2018	Incumbent re-elected.	▌ ✓ Sean Casten (Democratic) 52.8%; ▌Jeanne Ives (Republican) 45.4%; ▌Bill Redpath (Libertarian) 1.8%
Illinois 7	D+38	Danny Davis	Democratic	1996	Incumbent re-elected.	▌ ✓ Danny Davis (Democratic) 80.4%; ▌Craig Cameron (Republican) 13.4%; ▌Tracy Jennings (Independent) 6.2%
Illinois 8	D+8	Raja Krishnamoorthi	Democratic	2016	Incumbent re-elected.	▌ ✓ Raja Krishnamoorthi (Democratic) 73.2%; ▌Preston Nelson (Libertarian) 26.8%
Illinois 9	D+18	Jan Schakowsky	Democratic	1998	Incumbent re-elected.	▌ ✓ Jan Schakowsky (Democratic) 71.0%; ▌Sargis Sangari (Republican) 29.0%
Illinois 10	D+10	Brad Schneider	Democratic	2012; 2014 (defeated); 2016	Incumbent re-elected.	▌ ✓ Brad Schneider (Democratic) 63.9%; ▌Valerie Mukherjee (Republican) 36.1%
Illinois 11	D+9	Bill Foster	Democratic	2008 (special); 2010 (defeated); 2012	Incumbent re-elected.	▌ ✓ Bill Foster (Democratic) 63.3%; ▌Rick Laib (Republican) 36.7%
Illinois 12	R+5	Mike Bost	Republican	2014	Incumbent re-elected.	▌ ✓ Mike Bost (Republican) 60.4%; ▌Raymond Lenzi (Democratic) 39.6%
Illinois 13	R+3	Rodney Davis	Republican	2012	Incumbent re-elected.	▌ ✓ Rodney Davis (Republican) 54.5%; ▌Betsy Dirksen Londrigan (Democratic) 45.5%
Illinois 14	R+5	Lauren Underwood	Democratic	2018	Incumbent re-elected.	▌ ✓ Lauren Underwood (Democratic) 50.7%; ▌Jim Oberweis (Republican) 49.3%
Illinois 15	R+21	John Shimkus	Republican	1996	Incumbent retired. Republican hold.	▌ ✓ Mary Miller (Republican) 73.5%; ▌Erika Weaver (Democratic) 26.5%
Illinois 16	R+8	Adam Kinzinger	Republican	2010	Incumbent re-elected.	▌ ✓ Adam Kinzinger (Republican) 64.7%; ▌Dani Brzozowski (Democratic) 35.3%
Illinois 17	D+3	Cheri Bustos	Democratic	2012	Incumbent re-elected.	▌ ✓ Cheri Bustos (Democratic) 52.0%; ▌Esther Joy King (Republican) 48.0%
Illinois 18	R+15	Darin LaHood	Republican	2015 (special)	Incumbent re-elected	▌ ✓ Darin LaHood (Republican) 70.4%; ▌George Petrilli (Democratic) 29.6%

== Indiana ==
Indiana's results

District		Incumbent			This race	
Location	PVI	Member	Party	First elected	Results	Candidates
Indiana 1	D+8	Pete Visclosky	Democratic	1984	Incumbent retired. Democratic hold.	▌ ✓ Frank J. Mrvan (Democratic) 56.6%; ▌Mark Leyva (Republican) 40.5%; ▌Michael Strauss (Libertarian) 2.9%
Indiana 2	R+11	Jackie Walorski	Republican	2012	Incumbent re-elected.	▌ ✓ Jackie Walorski (Republican) 61.5%; ▌Pat Hackett (Democratic) 38.5%
Indiana 3	R+18	Jim Banks	Republican	2016	Incumbent re-elected.	▌ ✓ Jim Banks (Republican) 67.8%; ▌Chip Coldiron (Democratic) 32.2%
Indiana 4	R+17	Jim Baird	Republican	2018	Incumbent re-elected.	▌ ✓ Jim Baird (Republican) 66.6%; ▌Joe Mackey (Democratic) 33.4%
Indiana 5	R+9	Susan Brooks	Republican	2012	Incumbent retired. Republican hold.	▌ ✓ Victoria Spartz (Republican) 50.0%; ▌Christina Hale (Democratic) 46.0%; ▌Kenneth Tucker (Libertarian) 4.0%
Indiana 6	R+18	Greg Pence	Republican	2018	Incumbent re-elected.	▌ ✓ Greg Pence (Republican) 68.6%; ▌Jeannine Lee Lake (Democratic) 27.8%; ▌Tom Ferkinhoff (Libertarian) 3.6%
Indiana 7	D+11	André Carson	Democratic	2008 (special)	Incumbent re-elected.	▌ ✓ André Carson (Democratic) 62.4%; ▌Susan Marie Smith (Republican) 37.6%
Indiana 8	R+15	Larry Bucshon	Republican	2010	Incumbent re-elected.	▌ ✓ Larry Bucshon (Republican) 66.9%; ▌E. Thomasina Marsili (Democratic) 29.8%; ▌James Rodenberger (Libertarian) 3.2%
Indiana 9	R+13	Trey Hollingsworth	Republican	2016	Incumbent re-elected.	▌ ✓ Trey Hollingsworth (Republican) 61.8%; ▌Andy Ruff (Democratic) 34.1%; ▌Tonya Millis (Libertarian) 4.0%

== Iowa ==
Iowa's results

District		Incumbent			This race	
Location	PVI	Member	Party	First elected	Results	Candidates
Iowa 1	D+1	Abby Finkenauer	Democratic	2018	Incumbent lost re-election. Republican gain.	▌ ✓ Ashley Hinson (Republican) 51.2%; ▌Abby Finkenauer (Democratic) 48.7%
Iowa 2	D+1	Dave Loebsack	Democratic	2006	Incumbent retired. Republican gain.	▌ ✓ Mariannette Miller-Meeks (Republican) 49.912%; ▌Rita Hart (Democratic) 49.910%
Iowa 3	R+1	Cindy Axne	Democratic	2018	Incumbent re-elected.	▌ ✓ Cindy Axne (Democratic) 48.9%; ▌David Young (Republican) 47.6%; ▌Bryan Holder (Libertarian) 3.4%
Iowa 4	R+11	Steve King	Republican	2002	Incumbent lost renomination. Republican hold.	▌ ✓ Randy Feenstra (Republican) 62.0%; ▌J. D. Scholten (Democratic) 37.8%

== Kansas ==
Kansas's results

District		Incumbent			This race	
Location	PVI	Member	Party	First elected	Results	Candidates
Kansas 1	R+24	Roger Marshall	Republican	2016	Incumbent retired to run for U.S. senator. Republican hold.	▌ ✓ Tracey Mann (Republican) 71.2%; ▌Kali Barnett (Democratic) 28.8%
Kansas 2	R+10	Steve Watkins	Republican	2018	Incumbent lost renomination. Republican hold.	▌ ✓ Jake LaTurner (Republican) 55.2%; ▌Michelle De La Isla (Democratic) 40.6%; ▌Robert Garrard (Libertarian) 4.2%
Kansas 3	R+4	Sharice Davids	Democratic	2018	Incumbent re-elected.	▌ ✓ Sharice Davids (Democratic) 53.6%; ▌Amanda Adkins (Republican) 43.6%; ▌Steven Hohe (Libertarian) 2.8%
Kansas 4	R+15	Ron Estes	Republican	2017 (special)	Incumbent re-elected.	▌ ✓ Ron Estes (Republican) 63.7%; ▌Laura Lombard (Democratic) 36.3%

== Kentucky ==
Kentucky's results

District		Incumbent			This race	
Location	PVI	Member	Party	First elected	Results	Candidates
Kentucky 1	R+23	James Comer	Republican	2016	Incumbent re-elected.	▌ ✓ James Comer (Republican) 75.0%; ▌James Rhodes (Democratic) 25.0%
Kentucky 2	R+19	Brett Guthrie	Republican	2008	Incumbent re-elected.	▌ ✓ Brett Guthrie (Republican) 71.0%; ▌Hank Linderman (Democratic) 26.3%; ▌Robert Lee Perry (Libertarian) 2.1%; ▌Lewis Carter (Populist) 0.7%
Kentucky 3	D+6	John Yarmuth	Democratic	2006	Incumbent re-elected.	▌ ✓ John Yarmuth (Democratic) 62.7%; ▌Rhonda Palazzo (Republican) 37.3%
Kentucky 4	R+18	Thomas Massie	Republican	2012	Incumbent re-elected.	▌ ✓ Thomas Massie (Republican) 67.1%; ▌Alexandra Owensby (Democratic) 32.9%
Kentucky 5	R+31	Hal Rogers	Republican	1980	Incumbent re-elected.	▌ ✓ Hal Rogers (Republican) 84.2%; ▌Matthew Best (Democratic) 15.8%
Kentucky 6	R+9	Andy Barr	Republican	2012	Incumbent re-elected.	▌ ✓ Andy Barr (Republican) 57.3%; ▌Josh Hicks (Democratic) 41.0%; ▌Frank Harris (Libertarian) 1.7%

== Louisiana ==
Louisiana's results

District		Incumbent			This race	
Location	PVI	Member	Party	First elected	Results	Candidates
Louisiana 1	R+24	Steve Scalise	Republican	2008 (special)	Incumbent re-elected.	▌ ✓ Steve Scalise (Republican) 72.2%; ▌Lee Ann Dugas (Democratic) 25.3%; ▌Howard Kearney (Libertarian) 2.5%
Louisiana 2	D+25	Cedric Richmond	Democratic	2010	Incumbent re-elected.	▌ ✓ Cedric Richmond (Democratic) 63.6%; ▌David Schilling (Republican) 15.0%; ▌Glenn Harris (Democratic) 10.6%; ▌Sheldon Vincent (Republican) 4.9%; ▌Belden Batiste (Independent) 3.9%; ▌Colby James (Independent) 2.0%
Louisiana 3	R+20	Clay Higgins	Republican	2016	Incumbent re-elected.	▌ ✓ Clay Higgins (Republican) 67.8%; ▌Braylon Harris (Democratic) 17.9%; ▌Rob Anderson (Democratic) 11.6%; ▌Brandon Leleux (Libertarian) 2.8%
Louisiana 4	R+13	Mike Johnson	Republican	2016	Incumbent re-elected.	▌ ✓ Mike Johnson (Republican) 60.4%; ▌Kenny Houston (Democratic) 25.5%; ▌Ryan Trundle (Democratic) 7.8%; ▌Ben Gibson (Republican) 6.3%
Louisiana 5	R+15	Ralph Abraham	Republican	2014	Incumbent retired. Republican hold.	▌ ✓ Luke Letlow (Republican) 62.0%; ▌Lance Harris (Republican) 38.0%
Louisiana 6	R+19	Garret Graves	Republican	2014	Incumbent re-elected.	▌ ✓ Garret Graves (Republican) 71.0%; ▌Dartanyon Williams (Democratic) 25.5%; ▌Shannon Sloan (Libertarian) 2.6%; ▌Richard Torregano (Independent) 0.8%

== Maine ==
Maine's results

District		Incumbent			This race	
Location	PVI	Member	Party	First elected	Results	Candidates
Maine 1	D+8	Chellie Pingree	Democratic	2008	Incumbent re-elected.	▌ ✓ Chellie Pingree (Democratic) 62.2%; ▌Jay Allen (Republican) 37.8%
Maine 2	R+2	Jared Golden	Democratic	2018	Incumbent re-elected.	▌ ✓ Jared Golden (Democratic) 53.0%; ▌Dale Crafts (Republican) 47.0%

== Maryland ==
Maryland's results

District		Incumbent			This race	
Location	PVI	Member	Party	First elected	Results	Candidates
Maryland 1	R+14	Andy Harris	Republican	2010	Incumbent re-elected.	▌ ✓ Andy Harris (Republican) 63.4%; ▌Mia Mason (Democratic) 36.4%
Maryland 2	D+11	Dutch Ruppersberger	Democratic	2002	Incumbent re-elected.	▌ ✓ Dutch Ruppersberger (Democratic) 67.7%; ▌Johnny Ray Salling (Republican) 32.0%
Maryland 3	D+13	John Sarbanes	Democratic	2006	Incumbent re-elected.	▌ ✓ John Sarbanes (Democratic) 69.8%; ▌Charles Anthony (Republican) 30.0%
Maryland 4	D+28	Anthony Brown	Democratic	2016	Incumbent re-elected.	▌ ✓ Anthony Brown (Democratic) 79.6%; ▌George McDermott (Republican) 20.2%
Maryland 5	D+16	Steny Hoyer	Democratic	1981 (special)	Incumbent re-elected.	▌ ✓ Steny Hoyer (Democratic) 68.8%; ▌Chris Palombi (Republican) 31.0%
Maryland 6	D+6	David Trone	Democratic	2018	Incumbent re-elected.	▌ ✓ David Trone (Democratic) 58.8%; ▌Neil Parrott (Republican) 39.2%; ▌George Gluck (Green) 1.9%
Maryland 7	D+26	Kweisi Mfume	Democratic	1986; 1996 (resigned); 2020 (special)	Incumbent re-elected.	▌ ✓ Kweisi Mfume (Democratic) 71.6%; ▌Kimberly Klacik (Republican) 28.0%
Maryland 8	D+14	Jamie Raskin	Democratic	2016	Incumbent re-elected.	▌ ✓ Jamie Raskin (Democratic) 68.2%; ▌Gregory Coll (Republican) 31.6%

== Massachusetts ==
Massachusetts's results

District		Incumbent			This race	
Location	PVI	Member	Party	First elected	Results	Candidates
Massachusetts 1	D+12	Richard Neal	Democratic	1988	Incumbent re-elected.	▌ ✓ Richard Neal (Democratic) 96.5%
Massachusetts 2	D+9	Jim McGovern	Democratic	1996	Incumbent re-elected.	▌ ✓ Jim McGovern (Democratic) 65.3%; ▌Tracy Lovvorn (Republican) 34.6%
Massachusetts 3	D+9	Lori Trahan	Democratic	2018	Incumbent re-elected.	▌ ✓ Lori Trahan (Democratic) 97.7%
Massachusetts 4	D+9	Joe Kennedy III	Democratic	2012	Incumbent retired to run for U.S. senator. Democratic hold.	▌ ✓ Jake Auchincloss (Democratic) 60.8%; ▌Julie Hall (Republican) 38.9%
Massachusetts 5	D+18	Katherine Clark	Democratic	2013 (special)	Incumbent re-elected.	▌ ✓ Katherine Clark (Democratic) 74.3%; ▌Caroline Colarusso (Republican) 25.6%
Massachusetts 6	D+6	Seth Moulton	Democratic	2014	Incumbent re-elected.	▌ ✓ Seth Moulton (Democratic) 65.4%; ▌John Paul Moran (Republican) 34.4%
Massachusetts 7	D+34	Ayanna Pressley	Democratic	2018	Incumbent re-elected.	▌ ✓ Ayanna Pressley (Democratic) 86.6%; ▌Roy Owens Sr. (Independent) 12.5%
Massachusetts 8	D+10	Stephen Lynch	Democratic	2001 (special)	Incumbent re-elected.	▌ ✓ Stephen Lynch (Democratic) 80.7%; ▌Jonathan Lott (Independent) 18.7%
Massachusetts 9	D+4	Bill Keating	Democratic	2010	Incumbent re-elected.	▌ ✓ Bill Keating (Democratic) 61.3%; ▌Helen Brady (Republican) 36.3%; ▌Michael Manley (Independent) 2.3%

== Michigan ==
Michigan's results

District		Incumbent			This race	
Location	PVI	Member	Party	First elected	Results	Candidates
Michigan 1	R+9	Jack Bergman	Republican	2016	Incumbent re-elected.	▌ ✓ Jack Bergman (Republican) 61.7%; ▌Dana Ferguson (Democratic) 36.8%; ▌Ben Boren (Libertarian) 1.5%
Michigan 2	R+9	Bill Huizenga	Republican	2010	Incumbent re-elected.	▌ ✓ Bill Huizenga (Republican) 59.2%; ▌Bryan Berghoef (Democratic) 38.2%; ▌Max Riekse (Libertarian) 1.3%; Others: ▌Jean-Michel Creviere (Green) 0.7%; ▌Gerald Van Sickle (U.S. Taxpayers) 0.6%
Michigan 3	R+6	Justin Amash	Libertarian	2010 (Note: Amash was elected as Republican. He left the party in 2019 and joined the Libertarian Party in April 2020.)	Incumbent retired. Republican gain.	▌ ✓ Peter Meijer (Republican) 53.0%; ▌Hillary Scholten (Democratic) 47.0%
Michigan 4	R+10	John Moolenaar	Republican	2014	Incumbent re-elected.	▌ ✓ John Moolenaar (Republican) 65.0%; ▌Jerry Hilliard (Democratic) 32.4%; ▌David Canny (Libertarian) 1.4%; ▌Amy Slepr (Green) 1.2%
Michigan 5	D+5	Dan Kildee	Democratic	2012	Incumbent re-elected.	▌ ✓ Dan Kildee (Democratic) 54.4%; ▌Tim Kelly (Republican) 41.8%; ▌Kathy Goodwin (Working Class) 2.3%; ▌James Harris (Libertarian) 1.5%
Michigan 6	R+4	Fred Upton	Republican	1986	Incumbent re-elected.	▌ ✓ Fred Upton (Republican) 55.8%; ▌Jon Hoadley (Democratic) 40.1%; ▌Jeff DePoy (Libertarian) 2.7%; ▌John Lawrence (Green) 1.2%
Michigan 7	R+7	Tim Walberg	Republican	2006; 2008 (lost); 2010	Incumbent re-elected.	▌ ✓ Tim Walberg (Republican) 58.7%; ▌Gretchen Driskell (Democratic) 41.3%
Michigan 8	R+4	Elissa Slotkin	Democratic	2018	Incumbent re-elected.	▌ ✓ Elissa Slotkin (Democratic) 50.9%; ▌Paul Junge (Republican) 47.3%; ▌Joe Hartman (Libertarian) 1.8%
Michigan 9	D+4	Andy Levin	Democratic	2018	Incumbent re-elected.	▌ ✓ Andy Levin (Democratic) 57.7%; ▌Charles Langworthy (Republican) 38.4%; ▌Andrea Kirby (Working Class) 2.3%; ▌Mike Saliba (Libertarian) 1.6%
Michigan 10	R+13	Paul Mitchell	Republican	2016	Incumbent retired. Republican hold.	▌ ✓ Lisa McClain (Republican) 66.3%; ▌Kimberly Bizon (Democratic) 33.7%
Michigan 11	R+4	Haley Stevens	Democratic	2018	Incumbent re-elected.	▌ ✓ Haley Stevens (Democratic) 50.2%; ▌Eric Esshaki (Republican) 47.8%; ▌Leonard Schwartz (Libertarian) 2.0%
Michigan 12	D+14	Debbie Dingell	Democratic	2014	Incumbent re-elected.	▌ ✓ Debbie Dingell (Democratic) 66.4%; ▌Jeff Jones (Republican) 30.7%; ▌Gary Walkowicz (Working Class) 2.9%
Michigan 13	D+32	Rashida Tlaib	Democratic	2018	Incumbent re-elected.	▌ ✓ Rashida Tlaib (Democratic) 78.1%; ▌David Dudenhoefer (Republican) 18.7%; ▌Sam Johnson (Working Class) 1.8%; Others: ▌Articia Bomer (U.S. Taxpayers) 0.7%; ▌D. Etta Wilcoxon (Green) 0.7%
Michigan 14	D+30	Brenda Lawrence	Democratic	2014	Incumbent re-elected.	▌ ✓ Brenda Lawrence (Democratic) 79.3%; ▌Robert Patrick (Republican) 18.3%; ▌Lisa Lane Gioia (Libertarian) 1.1%; Others: ▌Philip Kolody (Working Class) 0.7%; ▌Clyde Shabazz (Green) 0.6%

== Minnesota ==
Minnesota's results

District		Incumbent			This race	
Location	PVI	Member	Party	First elected	Results	Candidates
Minnesota 1	R+5	Jim Hagedorn	Republican	2018	Incumbent re-elected.	▌ ✓ Jim Hagedorn (Republican) 48.6%; ▌Dan Feehan (DFL) 45.5%; ▌Bill Rood (Legalize Cannabis) 5.8%
Minnesota 2	R+2	Angie Craig	DFL	2018	Incumbent re-elected.	▌ ✓ Angie Craig (DFL) 48.2%; ▌Tyler Kistner (Republican) 45.9%; ▌Adam Weeks † (Legal Marijuana) 5.8%
Minnesota 3	D+1	Dean Phillips	DFL	2018	Incumbent re-elected.	▌ ✓ Dean Phillips (DFL) 55.6%; ▌Kendall Qualls (Republican) 44.3%
Minnesota 4	D+14	Betty McCollum	DFL	2000	Incumbent re-elected.	▌ ✓ Betty McCollum (DFL) 63.2%; ▌Gene Rechtzigel (Republican) 29.0%; ▌Susan Sindt (Legalize Cannabis) 7.6%
Minnesota 5	D+26	Ilhan Omar	DFL	2018	Incumbent re-elected.	▌ ✓ Ilhan Omar (DFL) 64.3%; ▌Lacy Johnson (Republican) 25.8%; ▌Michael Moore (Legal Marijuana) 9.5%
Minnesota 6	R+12	Tom Emmer	Republican	2014	Incumbent re-elected.	▌ ✓ Tom Emmer (Republican) 65.7%; ▌Tawnja Zahradka (DFL) 34.2%
Minnesota 7	R+12	Collin Peterson	DFL	1990	Incumbent lost re-election. Republican gain.	▌ ✓ Michelle Fischbach (Republican) 53.4%; ▌Collin Peterson (DFL) 39.8%; ▌Slater Johnson (Legal Marijuana) 4.9%; ▌Rae Hart Anderson (Legalize Cannabis) 1.8%
Minnesota 8	R+4	Pete Stauber	Republican	2018	Incumbent re-elected.	▌ ✓ Pete Stauber (Republican) 56.7%; ▌Quinn Nystrom (DFL) 37.6%; ▌Judith Schwartzbacker (Legalize Cannabis) 5.6%

== Mississippi ==
Mississippi's results

District		Incumbent			This race	
Location	PVI	Member	Party	First elected	Results	Candidates
Mississippi 1	R+16	Trent Kelly	Republican	2015 (special)	Incumbent re-elected.	▌ ✓ Trent Kelly (Republican) 68.8%; ▌Antonia Eliason (Democratic) 31.2%
Mississippi 2	D+14	Bennie Thompson	Democratic	1993 (special)	Incumbent re-elected.	▌ ✓ Bennie Thompson (Democratic) 66.0%; ▌Brian Flowers (Republican) 34.0%
Mississippi 3	R+13	Michael Guest	Republican	2018	Incumbent re-elected.	▌ ✓ Michael Guest (Republican) 64.7%; ▌Dot Benford (Democratic) 35.3%
Mississippi 4	R+21	Steven Palazzo	Republican	2010	Incumbent re-elected.	▌ ✓ Steven Palazzo (Republican) 100.0%

== Missouri ==
Missouri's results

District		Incumbent			This race	
Location	PVI	Member	Party	First elected	Results	Candidates
Missouri 1	D+29	Lacy Clay	Democratic	2000	Incumbent lost renomination. Democratic hold.	▌ ✓ Cori Bush (Democratic) 78.8%; ▌Anthony Rogers (Republican) 19.0%; ▌Alex Furman (Libertarian) 2.1%
Missouri 2	R+8	Ann Wagner	Republican	2012	Incumbent re-elected.	▌ ✓ Ann Wagner (Republican) 51.9%; ▌Jill Schupp (Democratic) 45.5%; ▌Martin Schulte (Libertarian) 2.6%
Missouri 3	R+18	Blaine Luetkemeyer	Republican	2008	Incumbent re-elected.	▌ ✓ Blaine Luetkemeyer (Republican) 69.4%; ▌Megan Rezabek (Democratic) 28.5%; ▌Leonard J. Steinman II (Libertarian) 2.1%
Missouri 4	R+17	Vicky Hartzler	Republican	2010	Incumbent re-elected.	▌ ✓ Vicky Hartzler (Republican) 67.6%; ▌Lindsey Simmons (Democratic) 29.7%; ▌Steven K. Koonse (Libertarian) 2.7%
Missouri 5	D+7	Emanuel Cleaver	Democratic	2004	Incumbent re-elected.	▌ ✓ Emanuel Cleaver (Democratic) 58.8%; ▌Ryan Derks (Republican) 38.6%; ▌Robin Dominick (Libertarian) 2.6%
Missouri 6	R+16	Sam Graves	Republican	2000	Incumbent re-elected.	▌ ✓ Sam Graves (Republican) 67.1%; ▌Gena L. Ross (Democratic) 30.8%; ▌Jim Higgins (Libertarian) 2.1%
Missouri 7	R+23	Billy Long	Republican	2010	Incumbent re-elected.	▌ ✓ Billy Long (Republican) 68.9%; ▌Teresa Montseny (Democratic) 26.6%; ▌Kevin Craig (Libertarian) 4.2%
Missouri 8	R+24	Jason Smith	Republican	2013 (special)	Incumbent re-elected.	▌ ✓ Jason Smith (Republican) 76.9%; ▌Kathy Ellis (Democratic) 21.4%; ▌Tom Schmitz (Libertarian) 1.8%

== Montana ==
Montana's result by county

District		Incumbent			This race	
Location	PVI	Member	Party	First elected	Results	Candidates
Montana at-large	R+11	Greg Gianforte	Republican	2017 (special)	Incumbent retired to run for governor of Montana. Republican hold.	▌ ✓ Matt Rosendale (Republican) 56.4%; ▌Kathleen Williams (Democratic) 43.6%

== Nebraska ==
Nebraska's results

District		Incumbent			This race	
Location	PVI	Member	Party	First elected	Results	Candidates
Nebraska 1	R+11	Jeff Fortenberry	Republican	2004	Incumbent re-elected.	▌ ✓ Jeff Fortenberry (Republican) 59.5%; ▌Kate Bolz (Democratic) 37.7%; ▌Dennis Grace (Libertarian) 2.8%
Nebraska 2	R+4	Don Bacon	Republican	2016	Incumbent re-elected.	▌ ✓ Don Bacon (Republican) 50.8%; ▌Kara Eastman (Democratic) 46.2%; ▌Tyler Schaeffer (Libertarian) 3.0%
Nebraska 3	R+27	Adrian Smith	Republican	2006	Incumbent re-elected.	▌ ✓ Adrian Smith (Republican) 78.5%; ▌Mark Elworth Jr. (Democratic) 17.7%; ▌Dustin Hobbs (Libertarian) 3.8%

== Nevada ==
Nevada's results

District		Incumbent			This race	
Location	PVI	Member	Party	First elected	Results	Candidates
Nevada 1	D+15	Dina Titus	Democratic	2008; 2010 (lost); 2012	Incumbent re-elected.	▌ ✓ Dina Titus (Democratic) 61.8%; ▌Joyce Bentley (Republican) 33.4%; ▌Robert Van Strawder (Libertarian) 2.8%; ▌Kamau Bakari (Independent American) 2.1%
Nevada 2	R+7	Mark Amodei	Republican	2011 (special)	Incumbent re-elected.	▌ ✓ Mark Amodei (Republican) 56.5%; ▌Patricia Ackerman (Democratic) 40.7%; ▌Janine Hansen (Independent American) 2.8%
Nevada 3	R+2	Susie Lee	Democratic	2018	Incumbent re-elected.	▌ ✓ Susie Lee (Democratic) 48.8%; ▌Dan Rodimer (Republican) 45.8%; ▌Steve Brown (Libertarian) 2.9%; ▌Edward Bridges (Independent American) 2.5%
Nevada 4	D+3	Steven Horsford	Democratic	2014; 2016 (lost); 2018	Incumbent re-elected.	▌ ✓ Steven Horsford (Democratic) 50.7%; ▌Jim Marchant (Republican) 45.8%; ▌Jonathan Esteban (Libertarian) 2.4%; ▌Barry Rubinson (Independent American) 1.1%

== New Hampshire ==
New Hampshire's results

District		Incumbent			This race	
Location	PVI	Member	Party	First elected	Results	Candidates
New Hampshire 1	R+2	Chris Pappas	Democratic	2018	Incumbent re-elected.	▌ ✓ Chris Pappas (Democratic) 51.3%; ▌Matt Mowers (Republican) 46.2%; ▌Zachary Dumont (Libertarian) 2.4%
New Hampshire 2	D+2	Annie Kuster	Democratic	2012	Incumbent re-elected.	▌ ✓ Annie Kuster (Democratic) 53.9%; ▌Steve Negron (Republican) 43.7%; ▌Andrew Olding (Libertarian) 2.4%

== New Jersey ==
New Jersey's results

District		Incumbent			This race	
Location	PVI	Member	Party	First elected	Results	Candidates
New Jersey 1	D+13	Donald Norcross	Democratic	2014	Incumbent re-elected.	▌ ✓ Donald Norcross (Democratic) 62.5%; ▌Claire Gustafson (Republican) 37.5%
New Jersey 2	R+1	Jeff Van Drew	Republican	2018 (Note: Van Drew was elected as a Democrat and switched to the Republican Party in December 2019.)	Incumbent re-elected.	▌ ✓ Jeff Van Drew (Republican) 51.9%; ▌Amy Kennedy (Democratic) 46.2%; ▌Jenna Harvey (Independent) 1.1%; ▌Jesse Ehrnstrom (Libertarian) 0.8%
New Jersey 3	R+2	Andy Kim	Democratic	2018	Incumbent re-elected.	▌ ✓ Andy Kim (Democratic) 53.2%; ▌David Richter (Republican) 45.5%; Others: ▌Martin Weber (Independent) 0.9%; ▌Robert Shapiro (Independent Constitution) 0.4%
New Jersey 4	R+8	Chris Smith	Republican	1980	Incumbent re-elected.	▌ ✓ Chris Smith (Republican) 59.9%; ▌Stephanie Schmid (Democratic) 38.3%; Others: ▌Henry Schroeder (Independent) 0.7%; ▌Michael Rufo (Libertarian) 0.6%; ▌Andrew Machuta (Independent) 0.5%
New Jersey 5	R+3	Josh Gottheimer	Democratic	2016	Incumbent re-elected.	▌ ✓ Josh Gottheimer (Democratic) 53.2%; ▌Frank Pallotta (Republican) 45.6%; ▌Louis Vellucci (Independent) 1.2%
New Jersey 6	D+9	Frank Pallone	Democratic	1988	Incumbent re-elected.	▌ ✓ Frank Pallone (Democratic) 61.2%; ▌Christian Onuoha (Republican) 38.8%
New Jersey 7	R+3	Tom Malinowski	Democratic	2018	Incumbent re-elected.	▌ ✓ Tom Malinowski (Democratic) 50.6%; ▌Thomas Kean Jr. (Republican) 49.4%
New Jersey 8	D+27	Albio Sires	Democratic	2006	Incumbent re-elected.	▌ ✓ Albio Sires (Democratic) 74.0%; ▌Jason Mushnick (Republican) 24.6%; ▌Dan Delaney (Libertarian) 1.4%
New Jersey 9	D+16	Bill Pascrell	Democratic	1996	Incumbent re-elected.	▌ ✓ Bill Pascrell (Democratic) 65.8%; ▌Billy Prempeh (Republican) 31.9%; ▌Chris Auriemma (Independent) 2.3%
New Jersey 10	D+36	Donald Payne Jr.	Democratic	2012	Incumbent re-elected.	▌ ✓ Donald Payne Jr. (Democratic) 83.3%; ▌Jennifer Zinone (Republican) 13.9%; ▌Khaliah Fitchette (Independent) 1.2%; ▌Akil Khalfani (Independent) 1.2%; ▌John Mirrione (Libertarian) 0.4%
New Jersey 11	R+3	Mikie Sherrill	Democratic	2018	Incumbent re-elected.	▌ ✓ Mikie Sherrill (Democratic) 53.3%; ▌Rosemary Becchi (Republican) 46.7%
New Jersey 12	D+16	Bonnie Watson Coleman	Democratic	2014	Incumbent re-elected.	▌ ✓ Bonnie Watson Coleman (Democratic) 65.6%; ▌Mark Razzoli (Republican) 32.6%; ▌Ed Forchion (Legalize Marijuana) 1.3%; ▌Kenneth Cody (Independent) 0.5%

== New Mexico ==
New Mexico's results

District		Incumbent			This race	
Location	PVI	Member	Party	First elected	Results	Candidates
New Mexico 1	D+7	Deb Haaland	Democratic	2018	Incumbent re-elected.	▌ ✓ Deb Haaland (Democratic) 58.2%; ▌Michelle Garcia Holmes (Republican) 41.8%
New Mexico 2	R+6	Xochitl Torres Small	Democratic	2018	Incumbent lost re-election. Republican gain.	▌ ✓ Yvette Herrell (Republican) 53.7%; ▌Xochitl Torres Small (Democratic) 46.3%
New Mexico 3	D+8	Ben Ray Luján	Democratic	2008	Incumbent retired to run for U.S. senator. Democratic hold.	▌ ✓ Teresa Leger Fernandez (Democratic) 58.7%; ▌Alexis Johnson (Republican) 41.3%

== New York ==
New York's results

District		Incumbent			This race	
Location	PVI	Member	Party	First elected	Results	Candidates
New York 1	R+5	Lee Zeldin	Republican	2014	Incumbent re-elected.	▌ ✓ Lee Zeldin (Republican) 54.9%; ▌Nancy Goroff (Democratic) 45.1%
New York 2	R+3	Peter King	Republican	1992	Incumbent retired. Republican hold.	▌ ✓ Andrew Garbarino (Republican) 52.9%; ▌Jackie Gordon (Democratic) 46.0%; ▌Harry Burger (Green) 1.1%
New York 3	D+1	Thomas Suozzi	Democratic	2016	Incumbent re-elected.	▌ ✓ Thomas Suozzi (Democratic) 55.9%; ▌George Santos (Republican) 43.4%; ▌Howard Rabin (Libertarian) 0.5%
New York 4	D+4	Kathleen Rice	Democratic	2014	Incumbent re-elected.	▌ ✓ Kathleen Rice (Democratic) 56.1%; ▌Douglas Tuman (Republican) 43.0%; ▌Joseph Naham (Green) 0.9%
New York 5	D+37	Gregory Meeks	Democratic	1998	Incumbent re-elected.	▌ ✓ Gregory Meeks (Democratic) 100.0%
New York 6	D+16	Grace Meng	Democratic	2012	Incumbent re-elected.	▌ ✓ Grace Meng (Democratic) 68.0%; ▌Thomas Zmich (Republican) 32.0%
New York 7	D+38	Nydia Velázquez	Democratic	1992	Incumbent re-elected.	▌ ✓ Nydia Velázquez (Democratic) 84.9%; ▌Brian Kelly (Republican) 14.4%; ▌Gilbert Midonnet (Libertarian) 0.7%
New York 8	D+36	Hakeem Jeffries	Democratic	2012	Incumbent re-elected.	▌ ✓ Hakeem Jeffries (Democratic) 84.8%; ▌Garfield Wallace (Republican) 15.2%
New York 9	D+34	Yvette Clarke	Democratic	2006	Incumbent re-elected.	▌ ✓ Yvette Clarke (Democratic) 83.1%; ▌Constantin Jean-Pierre (Republican) 15.9%; Others: ▌Gary S. Popkin (Libertarian) 0.6%; ▌Joel Anabilah-Azumah (Serve America) 0.4%
New York 10	D+26	Jerry Nadler	Democratic	1992	Incumbent re-elected.	▌ ✓ Jerry Nadler (Democratic) 74.6%; ▌Cathy Bernstein (Republican) 24.2%; ▌Michael Madrid (Libertarian) 1.2%
New York 11	R+3	Max Rose	Democratic	2018	Incumbent lost re-election. Republican gain.	▌ ✓ Nicole Malliotakis (Republican) 53.2%; ▌Max Rose (Democratic) 46.8%
New York 12	D+31	Carolyn Maloney	Democratic	1992	Incumbent re-elected.	▌ ✓ Carolyn Maloney (Democratic) 82.3%; ▌Carlos Santiago-Cano (Republican) 16.5%; ▌Steven Kolln (Libertarian) 1.2%
New York 13	D+43	Adriano Espaillat	Democratic	2016	Incumbent re-elected.	▌ ✓ Adriano Espaillat (Democratic) 90.9%; ▌Lovelynn Gwinn (Republican) 7.8%; ▌Christopher Morris-Perry (Conservative) 1.3%
New York 14	D+29	Alexandria Ocasio-Cortez	Democratic	2018	Incumbent re-elected.	▌ ✓ Alexandria Ocasio-Cortez (Democratic) 71.6%; ▌John Cummings (Republican) 27.4%; ▌Michelle Caruso-Cabrera (Serve America) 1.0%
New York 15	D+44	José E. Serrano	Democratic	1990	Incumbent retired. Democratic hold.	▌ ✓ Ritchie Torres (Democratic) 88.9%; ▌Patrick Delices (Republican) 11.1%
New York 16	D+24	Eliot Engel	Democratic	1988	Incumbent lost renomination. Democratic hold.	▌ ✓ Jamaal Bowman (Democratic) 84.2%; ▌Patrick McManus (Conservative) 15.8%
New York 17	D+7	Nita Lowey	Democratic	1988	Incumbent retired. Democratic hold.	▌ ✓ Mondaire Jones (Democratic) 59.3%; ▌Maureen McArdle-Schulman (Republican) 35.3%; ▌Yehudis Gottesfeld (Conservative) 2.7%; ▌Joshua Eisen (Independent) 1.9%; ▌Michael Parietti (Serve America) 0.8%
New York 18	R+1	Sean Patrick Maloney	Democratic	2012	Incumbent re-elected.	▌ ✓ Sean Patrick Maloney (Democratic) 55.8%; ▌Chele Farley (Republican) 43.2%; ▌Scott Smith (Libertarian) 1.0%
New York 19	R+2	Antonio Delgado	Democratic	2018	Incumbent re-elected.	▌ ✓ Antonio Delgado (Democratic) 54.8%; ▌Kyle Van De Water (Republican) 43.2%; ▌Victoria Alexander (Libertarian) 1.2%; ▌Steven Greenfield (Green) 0.8%
New York 20	D+7	Paul Tonko	Democratic	2008	Incumbent re-elected.	▌ ✓ Paul Tonko (Democratic) 61.2%; ▌Elizabeth Joy (Republican) 38.8%
New York 21	R+4	Elise Stefanik	Republican	2014	Incumbent re-elected.	▌ ✓ Elise Stefanik (Republican) 58.8%; ▌Tedra Cobb (Democratic) 41.2%
New York 22	R+6	Anthony Brindisi	Democratic	2018	Incumbent lost re-election. New member elected. Republican gain. Winner seated February 11, 2021 due to court-ordered recount.	▌ ✓ Claudia Tenney (Republican) 48.84%; ▌Anthony Brindisi (Democratic) 48.80%; ▌Keith Price (Libertarian) 2.12%
New York 23	R+6	Tom Reed	Republican	2010 (special)	Incumbent re-elected.	▌ ✓ Tom Reed (Republican) 57.7%; ▌Tracy Mitrano (Democratic) 41.1%; ▌Andrew Kolstee (Libertarian) 1.2%
New York 24	D+3	John Katko	Republican	2014	Incumbent re-elected.	▌ ✓ John Katko (Republican) 53.1%; ▌Dana Balter (Democratic) 43.0%; ▌Steven Williams (Working Families) 3.9%
New York 25	D+8	Joseph Morelle	Democratic	2018 (special)	Incumbent re-elected.	▌ ✓ Joseph Morelle (Democratic) 59.3%; ▌George Mitris (Republican) 39.2%; ▌Kevin Wilson (Libertarian) 1.5%
New York 26	D+11	Brian Higgins	Democratic	2004	Incumbent re-elected.	▌ ✓ Brian Higgins (Democratic) 69.9%; ▌Ricky Donovan (Republican) 28.7%; ▌Michael Raleigh (Green) 1.4%
New York 27	R+11	Chris Jacobs	Republican	2020 (special)	Incumbent re-elected.	▌ ✓ Chris Jacobs (Republican) 59.7%; ▌Nate McMurray (Democratic) 39.0%; ▌Duane Whitmer (Libertarian) 1.3%

== North Carolina ==
North Carolina's results

District		Incumbent			This race	
Location	PVI	Member	Party	First elected	Results	Candidates
North Carolina 1	D+5	G. K. Butterfield	Democratic	2004 (special)	Incumbent re-elected.	▌ ✓ G. K. Butterfield (Democratic) 54.2%; ▌Sandy Smith (Republican) 45.8%
North Carolina 2	D+9	George Holding	Republican	2012	Incumbent retired. Democratic gain.	▌ ✓ Deborah Ross (Democratic) 63.0%; ▌Alan Swain (Republican) 34.8%; ▌Jeff Matemu (Libertarian) 2.2%
North Carolina 3	R+12	Greg Murphy	Republican	2019 (special)	Incumbent re-elected.	▌ ✓ Greg Murphy (Republican) 63.4%; ▌Daryl Farrow (Democratic) 36.6%
North Carolina 4	D+14	David Price	Democratic	1986; 1994 (lost); 1996	Incumbent re-elected.	▌ ✓ David Price (Democratic) 67.3%; ▌Robert Thomas (Republican) 32.7%
North Carolina 5	R+18	Virginia Foxx	Republican	2004	Incumbent re-elected.	▌ ✓ Virginia Foxx (Republican) 66.9%; ▌David Wilson Brown (Democratic) 31.1%; ▌Jeff Gregory (Constitution) 2.0%
North Carolina 6	D+9	Mark Walker	Republican	2014	Incumbent retired. Democratic gain.	▌ ✓ Kathy Manning (Democratic) 62.3%; ▌Lee Haywood (Republican) 37.7%
North Carolina 7	R+11	David Rouzer	Republican	2014	Incumbent re-elected.	▌ ✓ David Rouzer (Republican) 60.2%; ▌Christopher M. Ward (Democratic) 39.6%
North Carolina 8	R+5	Richard Hudson	Republican	2012	Incumbent re-elected.	▌ ✓ Richard Hudson (Republican) 53.3%; ▌Patricia Timmons-Goodson (Democratic) 46.7%
North Carolina 9	R+7	Dan Bishop	Republican	2019 (special)	Incumbent re-elected.	▌ ✓ Dan Bishop (Republican) 55.6%; ▌Cynthia Wallace (Democratic) 44.4%
North Carolina 10	R+20	Patrick McHenry	Republican	2004	Incumbent re-elected.	▌ ✓ Patrick McHenry (Republican) 68.9%; ▌David Parker (Democratic) 31.1%
North Carolina 11	R+9	Vacant			Rep. Mark Meadows (R) resigned March 30, 2020. New member elected. Republican hold.	▌ ✓ Madison Cawthorn (Republican) 54.5%; ▌Moe Davis (Democratic) 42.4%; ▌Tracey DeBruhl (Libertarian) 1.9%; ▌Tamara Zwinak (Green) 1.2%
North Carolina 12	D+14	Alma Adams	Democratic	2014	Incumbent re-elected.	▌ ✓ Alma Adams (Democratic) 100.0%
North Carolina 13	R+19	Ted Budd	Republican	2016	Incumbent re-elected.	▌ ✓ Ted Budd (Republican) 68.2%; ▌Scott Huffman (Democratic) 31.8%

== North Dakota ==
North Dakota's result by county

District		Incumbent			This race	
Location	PVI	Member	Party	First elected	Results	Candidates
North Dakota at-large	R+16	Kelly Armstrong	Republican	2018	Incumbent re-elected.	▌ ✓ Kelly Armstrong (Republican) 69.0%; ▌Zach Raknerud (Democratic-NPL) 27.6%; ▌Steven Peterson (Libertarian) 3.4%

== Ohio ==
Ohio's results

District		Incumbent			This race	
Location	PVI	Member	Party	First elected	Results	Candidates
Ohio 1	R+5	Steve Chabot	Republican	1994; 2008 (lost); 2010	Incumbent re-elected.	▌ ✓ Steve Chabot (Republican) 51.8%; ▌Kate Schroder (Democratic) 44.7%; ▌Kevin David Kahn (Libertarian) 3.5%
Ohio 2	R+9	Brad Wenstrup	Republican	2012	Incumbent re-elected.	▌ ✓ Brad Wenstrup (Republican) 61.1%; ▌Jaime Castle (Democratic) 38.9%
Ohio 3	D+19	Joyce Beatty	Democratic	2012	Incumbent re-elected.	▌ ✓ Joyce Beatty (Democratic) 70.8%; ▌Mark Richardson (Republican) 29.2%
Ohio 4	R+14	Jim Jordan	Republican	2006	Incumbent re-elected.	▌ ✓ Jim Jordan (Republican) 67.9%; ▌Shannon Freshour (Democratic) 29.3%; ▌Steve Perkins (Libertarian) 2.8%
Ohio 5	R+11	Bob Latta	Republican	2008	Incumbent re-elected.	▌ ✓ Bob Latta (Republican) 68.0%; ▌Nick Rubando (Democratic) 32.0%
Ohio 6	R+16	Bill Johnson	Republican	2010	Incumbent re-elected.	▌ ✓ Bill Johnson (Republican) 74.4%; ▌Shawna Roberts (Democratic) 25.6%
Ohio 7	R+12	Bob Gibbs	Republican	2010	Incumbent re-elected.	▌ ✓ Bob Gibbs (Republican) 67.5%; ▌Quentin Potter (Democratic) 29.2%; ▌Brandon Lape (Libertarian) 3.3%
Ohio 8	R+17	Warren Davidson	Republican	2016 (special)	Incumbent re-elected.	▌ ✓ Warren Davidson (Republican) 69.0%; ▌Vanessa Enoch (Democratic) 31.0%
Ohio 9	D+14	Marcy Kaptur	Democratic	1982	Incumbent re-elected.	▌ ✓ Marcy Kaptur (Democratic) 63.1%; ▌Rob Weber (Republican) 36.9%
Ohio 10	R+4	Mike Turner	Republican	2002	Incumbent re-elected.	▌ ✓ Mike Turner (Republican) 58.4%; ▌Desiree Tims (Democratic) 41.6%
Ohio 11	D+32	Marcia Fudge	Democratic	2008 (special)	Incumbent re-elected.	▌ ✓ Marcia Fudge (Democratic) 80.1%; ▌Laverne Gore (Republican) 19.9%
Ohio 12	R+7	Troy Balderson	Republican	2018 (special)	Incumbent re-elected.	▌ ✓ Troy Balderson (Republican) 55.2%; ▌Alaina Shearer (Democratic) 41.8%; ▌John S. Stewart (Libertarian) 3.0%
Ohio 13	D+7	Tim Ryan	Democratic	2002	Incumbent re-elected.	▌ ✓ Tim Ryan (Democratic) 52.5%; ▌Christina Hagan (Republican) 44.9%; ▌Michael Fricke (Libertarian) 2.6%
Ohio 14	R+5	David Joyce	Republican	2012	Incumbent re-elected.	▌ ✓ David Joyce (Republican) 60.1%; ▌Hillary O'Connor Mueri (Democratic) 39.9%
Ohio 15	R+7	Steve Stivers	Republican	2010	Incumbent re-elected.	▌ ✓ Steve Stivers (Republican) 63.4%; ▌Joel Newby (Democratic) 36.6%
Ohio 16	R+8	Anthony Gonzalez	Republican	2018	Incumbent re-elected.	▌ ✓ Anthony Gonzalez (Republican) 63.2%; ▌Aaron Paul Godfrey (Democratic) 36.8%

== Oklahoma ==
Oklahoma's results

District		Incumbent			This race	
Location	PVI	Member	Party	First elected	Results	Candidates
Oklahoma 1	R+17	Kevin Hern	Republican	2018	Incumbent re-elected.	▌ ✓ Kevin Hern (Republican) 63.7%; ▌Kojo Asamoa-Caesar (Democratic) 32.7%; ▌Evelyn Rogers (Independent) 3.6%
Oklahoma 2	R+24	Markwayne Mullin	Republican	2012	Incumbent re-elected.	▌ ✓ Markwayne Mullin (Republican) 75.0%; ▌Danyell Lanier (Democratic) 22.0%; ▌Richie Castaldo (Libertarian) 3.0%
Oklahoma 3	R+27	Frank Lucas	Republican	1994	Incumbent re-elected.	▌ ✓ Frank Lucas (Republican) 78.5%; ▌Zoe Midyett (Democratic) 21.5%
Oklahoma 4	R+20	Tom Cole	Republican	2002	Incumbent re-elected.	▌ ✓ Tom Cole (Republican) 67.8%; ▌Mary Brannon (Democratic) 28.8%; ▌Bob White (Libertarian) 3.4%
Oklahoma 5	R+10	Kendra Horn	Democratic	2018	Incumbent lost re-election. Republican gain.	▌ ✓ Stephanie Bice (Republican) 52.1%; ▌Kendra Horn (Democratic) 47.9%

== Oregon ==
Oregon's results

District		Incumbent			This race	
Location	PVI	Member	Party	First elected	Results	Candidates
Oregon 1	D+9	Suzanne Bonamici	Democratic	2012 (special)	Incumbent re-elected.	▌ ✓ Suzanne Bonamici (Democratic) 64.6%; ▌Christopher Christensen (Republican) 35.2%
Oregon 2	R+11	Greg Walden	Republican	1998	Incumbent retired. Republican hold.	▌ ✓ Cliff Bentz (Republican) 59.9%; ▌Alex Spenser (Democratic) 36.9%; ▌Robert Werch (Libertarian) 3.1%
Oregon 3	D+24	Earl Blumenauer	Democratic	1996	Incumbent re-elected.	▌ ✓ Earl Blumenauer (Democratic) 73.0%; ▌Joanna Harbour (Republican) 23.5%; ▌Alex DiBlasi (Pacific Green) 1.9%; ▌Josh Solomon (Libertarian) 1.5%
Oregon 4	Even	Peter DeFazio	Democratic	1986	Incumbent re-elected.	▌ ✓ Peter DeFazio (Democratic) 51.5%; ▌Alek Skarlatos (Republican) 46.2%; ▌Daniel Hoffay (Pacific Green) 2.2%
Oregon 5	Even	Kurt Schrader	Democratic	2008	Incumbent re-elected.	▌ ✓ Kurt Schrader (Democratic) 51.9%; ▌Amy Ryan Courser (Republican) 45.1%; ▌Matthew James Rix (Libertarian) 2.8%

== Pennsylvania ==
Pennsylvania's results

District		Incumbent			This race	
Location	PVI	Member	Party	First elected	Results	Candidates
Pennsylvania 1	R+1	Brian Fitzpatrick	Republican	2016	Incumbent re-elected.	▌ ✓ Brian Fitzpatrick (Republican) 56.6%; ▌Christina Finello (Democratic) 43.4%
Pennsylvania 2	D+25	Brendan Boyle	Democratic	2014	Incumbent re-elected.	▌ ✓ Brendan Boyle (Democratic) 72.5%; ▌David Torres (Republican) 27.5%
Pennsylvania 3	D+41	Dwight Evans	Democratic	2016	Incumbent re-elected.	▌ ✓ Dwight Evans (Democratic) 91.0%; ▌Michael Harvey (Republican) 9.0%
Pennsylvania 4	D+7	Madeleine Dean	Democratic	2018	Incumbent re-elected.	▌ ✓ Madeleine Dean (Democratic) 59.5%; ▌Kathy Barnette (Republican) 40.5%
Pennsylvania 5	D+13	Mary Gay Scanlon	Democratic	2018	Incumbent re-elected.	▌ ✓ Mary Gay Scanlon (Democratic) 64.7%; ▌Dasha Pruett (Republican) 35.3%
Pennsylvania 6	D+2	Chrissy Houlahan	Democratic	2018	Incumbent re-elected.	▌ ✓ Chrissy Houlahan (Democratic) 56.1%; ▌John Emmons (Republican) 43.9%
Pennsylvania 7	D+1	Susan Wild	Democratic	2018	Incumbent re-elected.	▌ ✓ Susan Wild (Democratic) 51.9%; ▌Lisa Scheller (Republican) 48.1%
Pennsylvania 8	R+1	Matt Cartwright	Democratic	2012	Incumbent re-elected.	▌ ✓ Matt Cartwright (Democratic) 51.8%; ▌Jim Bognet (Republican) 48.2%
Pennsylvania 9	R+14	Dan Meuser	Republican	2018	Incumbent re-elected.	▌ ✓ Dan Meuser (Republican) 66.3%; ▌Gary Wegman (Democratic) 33.7%
Pennsylvania 10	R+6	Scott Perry	Republican	2012	Incumbent re-elected.	▌ ✓ Scott Perry (Republican) 53.3%; ▌Eugene DePasquale (Democratic) 46.7%
Pennsylvania 11	R+14	Lloyd Smucker	Republican	2016	Incumbent re-elected.	▌ ✓ Lloyd Smucker (Republican) 63.1%; ▌Sarah Hammond (Democratic) 36.9%
Pennsylvania 12	R+17	Fred Keller	Republican	2019 (special)	Incumbent re-elected.	▌ ✓ Fred Keller (Republican) 70.8%; ▌Lee Griffin (Democratic) 29.2%
Pennsylvania 13	R+22	John Joyce	Republican	2018	Incumbent re-elected.	▌ ✓ John Joyce (Republican) 73.5%; ▌Todd Rowley (Democratic) 26.5%
Pennsylvania 14	R+14	Guy Reschenthaler	Republican	2018	Incumbent re-elected.	▌ ✓ Guy Reschenthaler (Republican) 64.7%; ▌Bill Marx (Democratic) 35.3%
Pennsylvania 15	R+20	Glenn Thompson	Republican	2008	Incumbent re-elected.	▌ ✓ Glenn Thompson (Republican) 73.5%; ▌Robert Williams (Democratic) 26.5%
Pennsylvania 16	R+8	Mike Kelly	Republican	2010	Incumbent re-elected.	▌ ✓ Mike Kelly (Republican) 59.3%; ▌Kristy Gnibus (Democratic) 40.7%
Pennsylvania 17	R+3	Conor Lamb	Democratic	2018 (special)	Incumbent re-elected.	▌ ✓ Conor Lamb (Democratic) 51.1%; ▌Sean Parnell (Republican) 48.9%
Pennsylvania 18	D+13	Mike Doyle	Democratic	1994	Incumbent re-elected.	▌ ✓ Mike Doyle (Democratic) 69.3%; ▌Luke Negron (Republican) 30.7%

== Rhode Island ==
Rhode Island's results

District		Incumbent			This race	
Location	PVI	Member	Party	First elected	Results	Candidates
Rhode Island 1	D+16	David Cicilline	Democratic	2010	Incumbent re-elected.	▌ ✓ David Cicilline (Democratic) 70.8%; ▌Jeffrey Lemire (Independent) 15.8%; ▌Frederick Wysocki (Independent) 12.6%
Rhode Island 2	D+6	Jim Langevin	Democratic	2000	Incumbent re-elected.	▌ ✓ Jim Langevin (Democratic) 58.2%; ▌Robert Lancia (Republican) 41.5%

== South Carolina ==
South Carolina's results

District		Incumbent			This race	
Location	PVI	Member	Party	First elected	Results	Candidates
South Carolina 1	R+10	Joe Cunningham	Democratic	2018	Incumbent lost re-election. Republican gain.	▌ ✓ Nancy Mace (Republican) 50.6%; ▌Joe Cunningham (Democratic) 49.3%
South Carolina 2	R+12	Joe Wilson	Republican	2001 (special)	Incumbent re-elected.	▌ ✓ Joe Wilson (Republican) 55.7%; ▌Adair Boroughs (Democratic) 42.6%; ▌Kathleen Wright (Constitution) 1.7%
South Carolina 3	R+19	Jeff Duncan	Republican	2010	Incumbent re-elected.	▌ ✓ Jeff Duncan (Republican) 71.2%; ▌Hosea Cleveland (Democratic) 28.7%
South Carolina 4	R+15	William Timmons	Republican	2018	Incumbent re-elected.	▌ ✓ William Timmons (Republican) 61.6%; ▌Kim Nelson (Democratic) 36.9%; ▌Michael Chandler (Constitution) 1.4%
South Carolina 5	R+9	Ralph Norman	Republican	2017 (special)	Incumbent re-elected.	▌ ✓ Ralph Norman (Republican) 60.1%; ▌Moe Brown (Democratic) 39.9%
South Carolina 6	D+19	Jim Clyburn	Democratic	1992	Incumbent re-elected.	▌ ✓ Jim Clyburn (Democratic) 68.2%; ▌John McCollum (Republican) 30.8%; ▌Mark Hackett (Constitution) 0.9%
South Carolina 7	R+9	Tom Rice	Republican	2012	Incumbent re-elected.	▌ ✓ Tom Rice (Republican) 61.8%; ▌Melissa Watson (Democratic) 38.1%

== South Dakota ==
South Dakota's result by county

District		Incumbent			This race	
Location	PVI	Member	Party	First elected	Results	Candidates
South Dakota at-large	R+14	Dusty Johnson	Republican	2018	Incumbent re-elected.	▌ ✓ Dusty Johnson (Republican) 81.0%; ▌Randy Luallin (Libertarian) 19.0%

== Tennessee ==
Tennessee's results

District		Incumbent			This race	
Location	PVI	Member	Party	First elected	Results	Candidates
Tennessee 1	R+28	Phil Roe	Republican	2008	Incumbent retired. Republican hold.	▌ ✓ Diana Harshbarger (Republican) 74.7%; ▌Blair Walsingham (Democratic) 22.5%; ▌Steve Holder (Independent) 2.8%
Tennessee 2	R+20	Tim Burchett	Republican	2018	Incumbent re-elected.	▌ ✓ Tim Burchett (Republican) 67.6%; ▌Renee Hoyos (Democratic) 31.1%; ▌Matthew Campbell (Independent) 1.3%
Tennessee 3	R+18	Chuck Fleischmann	Republican	2010	Incumbent re-elected.	▌ ✓ Chuck Fleischmann (Republican) 67.3%; ▌Meg Gorman (Democratic) 30.5%; ▌Amber Hysell (Independent) 1.6%; ▌Keith Sweitzer (Independent) 0.6%
Tennessee 4	R+20	Scott DesJarlais	Republican	2010	Incumbent re-elected.	▌ ✓ Scott DesJarlais (Republican) 66.7%; ▌Christopher J. Hale (Democratic) 33.3%
Tennessee 5	D+7	Jim Cooper	Democratic	1982; 1994 (retired); 2002	Incumbent re-elected.	▌ ✓ Jim Cooper (Democratic) 100.0%
Tennessee 6	R+24	John Rose	Republican	2018	Incumbent re-elected.	▌ ✓ John Rose (Republican) 73.7%; ▌Christopher Finley (Democratic) 24.0%; ▌Christopher Monday (Independent) 2.3%
Tennessee 7	R+20	Mark Green	Republican	2018	Incumbent re-elected.	▌ ✓ Mark Green (Republican) 69.9%; ▌Kiran Sreepada (Democratic) 27.3%; ▌Ronald Brown (Independent) 2.2%; ▌Scott Vieira Jr. (Independent) 0.6%
Tennessee 8	R+19	David Kustoff	Republican	2016	Incumbent re-elected.	▌ ✓ David Kustoff (Republican) 68.5%; ▌Erika Stotts Pearson (Democratic) 29.5%; ▌James Hart (Independent) 1.1%; ▌Jon Dillard (Independent) 0.9%
Tennessee 9	D+28	Steve Cohen	Democratic	2006	Incumbent re-elected.	▌ ✓ Steve Cohen (Democratic) 77.4%; ▌Charlotte Bergmann (Republican) 20.1%; ▌Dennis Clark (Independent) 1.6%; ▌Bobby Lyons (Independent) 0.9%

== Texas ==
District		Incumbent			This race	
Location	PVI	Member	Party	First elected	Results	Candidates
Texas 1	R+25	Louie Gohmert	Republican	2004	Incumbent re-elected.	▌ ✓ Louie Gohmert (Republican) 72.6%; ▌Hank Gilbert (Democratic) 27.4%
Texas 2	R+11	Dan Crenshaw	Republican	2018	Incumbent re-elected.	▌ ✓ Dan Crenshaw (Republican) 55.6%; ▌Sima Ladjevardian (Democratic) 42.8%; ▌Elliott Scheirman (Libertarian) 1.6%
Texas 3	R+13	Van Taylor	Republican	2018	Incumbent re-elected.	▌ ✓ Van Taylor (Republican) 55.1%; ▌Lulu Seikaly (Democratic) 42.9%; ▌Christopher J. Claytor (Libertarian) 2.1%
Texas 4	R+28	Vacant			Rep. John Ratcliffe (R) resigned May 22, 2020. Republican hold.	▌ ✓ Pat Fallon (Republican) 75.1%; ▌Russell Foster (Democratic) 22.6%; ▌Lou Antonelli (Libertarian) 1.9%
Texas 5	R+16	Lance Gooden	Republican	2018	Incumbent re-elected.	▌ ✓ Lance Gooden (Republican) 62.0%; ▌Carolyn Salter (Democratic) 35.9%; ▌Kevin Hale (Libertarian) 2.1%
Texas 6	R+9	Ron Wright	Republican	2018	Incumbent re-elected.	▌ ✓ Ron Wright (Republican) 52.8%; ▌Stephen Daniel (Democratic) 44.0%; ▌Melanie Black (Libertarian) 3.2%
Texas 7	R+7	Lizzie Fletcher	Democratic	2018	Incumbent re-elected.	▌ ✓ Lizzie Fletcher (Democratic) 50.8%; ▌Wesley Hunt (Republican) 47.4%; ▌Shawn Kelly (Libertarian) 1.8%
Texas 8	R+28	Kevin Brady	Republican	1996	Incumbent re-elected.	▌ ✓ Kevin Brady (Republican) 72.5%; ▌Elizabeth Hernandez (Democratic) 25.5%; ▌Chris Duncan (Libertarian) 2.0%
Texas 9	D+29	Al Green	Democratic	2004	Incumbent re-elected.	▌ ✓ Al Green (Democratic) 75.5%; ▌Johnny Teague (Republican) 21.6%; ▌José Sosa (Libertarian) 2.9%
Texas 10	R+9	Michael McCaul	Republican	2004	Incumbent re-elected.	▌ ✓ Michael McCaul (Republican) 52.5%; ▌Mike Siegel (Democratic) 45.3%; ▌Roy Eriksen (Libertarian) 2.2%
Texas 11	R+32	Mike Conaway	Republican	2004	Incumbent retired. Republican hold.	▌ ✓ August Pfluger (Republican) 79.7%; ▌Jon Mark Hogg (Democratic) 18.3%; ▌Wacey Alpha Cody (Libertarian) 2.0%
Texas 12	R+18	Kay Granger	Republican	1996	Incumbent re-elected.	▌ ✓ Kay Granger (Republican) 63.7%; ▌Lisa Welch (Democratic) 33.0%; ▌Trey Holcomb (Libertarian) 3.3%
Texas 13	R+33	Mac Thornberry	Republican	1994	Incumbent retired. Republican hold.	▌ ✓ Ronny Jackson (Republican) 79.4%; ▌Gus Trujillo (Democratic) 18.5%; ▌Jack Westbrook (Libertarian) 2.1%
Texas 14	R+12	Randy Weber	Republican	2012	Incumbent re-elected.	▌ ✓ Randy Weber (Republican) 61.6%; ▌Adrienne Bell (Democratic) 38.4%
Texas 15	D+7	Vicente González	Democratic	2016	Incumbent re-elected.	▌ ✓ Vicente González (Democratic) 50.5%; ▌Monica De La Cruz (Republican) 47.6%; ▌Ross Lynn Leone (Libertarian) 1.9%
Texas 16	D+17	Veronica Escobar	Democratic	2018	Incumbent re-elected.	▌ ✓ Veronica Escobar (Democratic) 64.7%; ▌Irene Armendariz-Jackson (Republican) 35.3%
Texas 17	R+12	Bill Flores	Republican	2010	Incumbent retired. Republican hold.	▌ ✓ Pete Sessions (Republican) 55.9%; ▌Rick Kennedy (Democratic) 40.9%; ▌Ted Brown (Libertarian) 3.2%
Texas 18	D+27	Sheila Jackson Lee	Democratic	1994	Incumbent re-elected.	▌ ✓ Sheila Jackson Lee (Democratic) 73.3%; ▌Wendell Champion (Republican) 23.5%; ▌Luke Spencer (Libertarian) 1.8%; ▌Vince Duncan (Independent) 1.4%
Texas 19	R+27	Jodey Arrington	Republican	2016	Incumbent re-elected.	▌ ✓ Jodey Arrington (Republican) 74.8%; ▌Tom Watson (Democratic) 22.9%; ▌Joe Burnes (Libertarian) 2.4%
Texas 20	D+10	Joaquin Castro	Democratic	2012	Incumbent re-elected.	▌ ✓ Joaquin Castro (Democratic) 64.7%; ▌Mauro Garza (Republican) 33.1%; ▌Jeffrey C. Blunt (Libertarian) 2.2%
Texas 21	R+10	Chip Roy	Republican	2018	Incumbent re-elected.	▌ ✓ Chip Roy (Republican) 52.0%; ▌Wendy Davis (Democratic) 45.3%; ▌Arthur DiBianca (Libertarian) 1.9%; ▌Tommy Wakely (Green) 0.8%
Texas 22	R+10	Pete Olson	Republican	2008	Incumbent retired. Republican hold.	▌ ✓ Troy Nehls (Republican) 51.5%; ▌Sri Preston Kulkarni (Democratic) 44.6%; ▌Joseph LeBlanc Jr. (Libertarian) 3.9%
Texas 23	R+1	Will Hurd	Republican	2014	Incumbent retired. Republican hold.	▌ ✓ Tony Gonzales (Republican) 50.6%; ▌Gina Ortiz Jones (Democratic) 46.6%; ▌Beto Villela (Libertarian) 2.8%
Texas 24	R+9	Kenny Marchant	Republican	2004	Incumbent retired. Republican hold.	▌ ✓ Beth Van Duyne (Republican) 48.8%; ▌Candace Valenzuela (Democratic) 47.5%; ▌Darren Hamilton (Libertarian) 1.6%; ▌Steve Kuzmich (Independent) 1.2%; ▌Mark Bauer (Independent) 0.9%
Texas 25	R+11	Roger Williams	Republican	2012	Incumbent re-elected.	▌ ✓ Roger Williams (Republican) 55.9%; ▌Julie Oliver (Democratic) 42.1%; ▌Bill Kelsey (Libertarian) 2.0%
Texas 26	R+18	Michael C. Burgess	Republican	2002	Incumbent re-elected.	▌ ✓ Michael C. Burgess (Republican) 60.6%; ▌Carol Iannuzzi (Democratic) 37.3%; ▌Mark Boler (Libertarian) 2.1%
Texas 27	R+13	Michael Cloud	Republican	2018 (special)	Incumbent re-elected.	▌ ✓ Michael Cloud (Republican) 63.1%; ▌Ricardo de la Fuente (Democratic) 34.9%; ▌Phil Gray (Libertarian) 2.0%
Texas 28	D+9	Henry Cuellar	Democratic	2004	Incumbent re-elected.	▌ ✓ Henry Cuellar (Democratic) 58.3%; ▌Sandra Whitten (Republican) 39.0%; ▌Bekah Congdon (Libertarian) 2.7%
Texas 29	D+19	Sylvia Garcia	Democratic	2018	Incumbent re-elected.	▌ ✓ Sylvia Garcia (Democratic) 71.1%; ▌Jaimy Blanco (Republican) 27.4%; ▌Phil Kurtz (Libertarian) 1.5%
Texas 30	D+18	Eddie Bernice Johnson	Democratic	1992	Incumbent re-elected.	▌ ✓ Eddie Bernice Johnson (Democratic) 77.5%; ▌Tre Pennie (Republican) 18.4%; ▌Eric Williams (Independent) 4.1%
Texas 31	R+10	John Carter	Republican	2002	Incumbent re-elected.	▌ ✓ John Carter (Republican) 53.4%; ▌Donna Imam (Democratic) 44.3%; ▌Clark Patterson (Libertarian) 2.2%
Texas 32	R+5	Colin Allred	Democratic	2018	Incumbent re-elected.	▌ ✓ Colin Allred (Democratic) 52.0%; ▌Genevieve Collins (Republican) 45.9%; ▌Christy Mowrey Peterson (Libertarian) 1.4%; ▌Jason Sigmon (Independent) 0.7%
Texas 33	D+23	Marc Veasey	Democratic	2012	Incumbent re-elected.	▌ ✓ Marc Veasey (Democratic) 66.8%; ▌Fabian Vasquez (Republican) 25.2%; ▌Carlos Quintanilla (Independent) 5.1%; ▌Jason Reeves (Libertarian) 1.6%; ▌Renedria Welton (Independent) 1.3%
Texas 34	D+10	Filemon Vela Jr.	Democratic	2012	Incumbent re-elected.	▌ ✓ Filemon Vela Jr. (Democratic) 55.4%; ▌Rey Gonzalez (Republican) 41.9%; ▌Anthony Cristo (Libertarian) 1.6%; ▌Chris Royal (Independent) 1.1%
Texas 35	D+15	Lloyd Doggett	Democratic	1994	Incumbent re-elected.	▌ ✓ Lloyd Doggett (Democratic) 65.4%; ▌Jenny Garcia Sharon (Republican) 30.0%; ▌Mark Loewe (Libertarian) 2.7%; ▌Jason Mata Sr. (Independent) 1.9%
Texas 36	R+26	Brian Babin	Republican	2014	Incumbent re-elected.	▌ ✓ Brian Babin (Republican) 73.6%; ▌Rashad Lewis (Democratic) 24.3%; ▌Chad Abbey (Libertarian) 1.6%; ▌Hal Ridley Jr. (Green) 0.5%

== Utah ==
Utah's results

District		Incumbent			This race	
Location	PVI	Member	Party	First elected	Results	Candidates
Utah 1	R+26	Rob Bishop	Republican	2002	Incumbent retired to run for lieutenant governor of Utah. Republican hold.	▌ ✓ Blake Moore (Republican) 69.5%; ▌Darren Parry (Democratic) 30.4%
Utah 2	R+16	Chris Stewart	Republican	2012	Incumbent re-elected.	▌ ✓ Chris Stewart (Republican) 59.0%; ▌Kael Weston (Democratic) 36.6%; ▌J. Robert Latham (Libertarian) 4.4%
Utah 3	R+25	John Curtis	Republican	2017 (special)	Incumbent re-elected.	▌ ✓ John Curtis (Republican) 68.7%; ▌Devin Thorpe (Democratic) 26.8%; ▌Daniel Cummings (Constitution) 2.5%; ▌Thomas McNeill (United Utah) 2.0%
Utah 4	R+13	Ben McAdams	Democratic	2018	Incumbent lost re-election. Republican gain.	▌ ✓ Burgess Owens (Republican) 47.7%; ▌Ben McAdams (Democratic) 46.7%; ▌John Molnar (Libertarian) 3.5%; ▌Jonia Broderick (United Utah) 2.1%

== Vermont ==
Vermont's result by county

District		Incumbent			This race	
Location	PVI	Member	Party	First elected	Results	Candidates
Vermont at-large	D+15	Peter Welch	Democratic	2006	Incumbent re-elected.	▌ ✓ Peter Welch (Democratic) 67.3%; ▌Miriam Berry (Republican) 27.0%; ▌Peter Becker (Independent) 2.3%; ▌Marcia Horne (Independent) 1.2%; ▌Christopher Helali (Communist) 1.0%; ▌Shawn Orr (Independent) 0.5%; ▌Jerry Trudell (Independent) 0.5%

== Virginia ==
Virginia's results

District		Incumbent			This race	
Location	PVI	Member	Party	First elected	Results	Candidates
Virginia 1	R+8	Rob Wittman	Republican	2007 (special)	Incumbent re-elected.	▌ ✓ Rob Wittman (Republican) 58.2%; ▌Qasim Rashid (Democratic) 41.7%
Virginia 2	R+3	Elaine Luria	Democratic	2018	Incumbent re-elected.	▌ ✓ Elaine Luria (Democratic) 51.6%; ▌Scott Taylor (Republican) 45.8%; ▌David Foster (Independent) 2.5%
Virginia 3	D+16	Bobby Scott	Democratic	1992	Incumbent re-elected.	▌ ✓ Bobby Scott (Democratic) 68.4%; ▌John Collick (Republican) 31.4%
Virginia 4	D+10	Donald McEachin	Democratic	2016	Incumbent re-elected.	▌ ✓ Donald McEachin (Democratic) 61.6%; ▌Leon Benjamin (Republican) 38.2%
Virginia 5	R+6	Denver Riggleman	Republican	2018	Incumbent lost renomination. Republican hold.	▌ ✓ Bob Good (Republican) 52.4%; ▌Cameron Webb (Democratic) 47.3%
Virginia 6	R+13	Ben Cline	Republican	2018	Incumbent re-elected.	▌ ✓ Ben Cline (Republican) 64.6%; ▌Nicholas Betts (Democratic) 35.3%
Virginia 7	R+6	Abigail Spanberger	Democratic	2018	Incumbent re-elected.	▌ ✓ Abigail Spanberger (Democratic) 50.8%; ▌Nick Freitas (Republican) 49.0%
Virginia 8	D+21	Don Beyer	Democratic	2014	Incumbent re-elected.	▌ ✓ Don Beyer (Democratic) 75.8%; ▌Jeff Jordan (Republican) 24.0%
Virginia 9	R+19	Morgan Griffith	Republican	2010	Incumbent re-elected.	▌ ✓ Morgan Griffith (Republican) 94.0%
Virginia 10	D+1	Jennifer Wexton	Democratic	2018	Incumbent re-elected.	▌ ✓ Jennifer Wexton (Democratic) 56.5%; ▌Aliscia Andrews (Republican) 43.4%
Virginia 11	D+15	Gerry Connolly	Democratic	2008	Incumbent re-elected.	▌ ✓ Gerry Connolly (Democratic) 71.4%; ▌Manga Anantatmula (Republican) 28.3%

== Washington ==
Washington's results

District		Incumbent			This race	
Location	PVI	Member	Party	First elected	Results	Candidates
Washington 1	D+6	Suzan DelBene	Democratic	2012	Incumbent re-elected.	▌ ✓ Suzan DelBene (Democratic) 58.6%; ▌Jeffrey Beeler (Republican) 41.3%
Washington 2	D+10	Rick Larsen	Democratic	2000	Incumbent re-elected.	▌ ✓ Rick Larsen (Democratic) 63.1%; ▌Tim Hazelo (Republican) 36.7%
Washington 3	R+4	Jaime Herrera Beutler	Republican	2010	Incumbent re-elected.	▌ ✓ Jaime Herrera Beutler (Republican) 56.4%; ▌Carolyn Long (Democratic) 43.4%
Washington 4	R+13	Dan Newhouse	Republican	2014	Incumbent re-elected.	▌ ✓ Dan Newhouse (Republican) 66.2%; ▌Douglas McKinley (Democratic) 33.6%
Washington 5	R+8	Cathy McMorris Rodgers	Republican	2004	Incumbent re-elected.	▌ ✓ Cathy McMorris Rodgers (Republican) 61.3%; ▌Dave Wilson (Democratic) 38.5%
Washington 6	D+6	Derek Kilmer	Democratic	2012	Incumbent re-elected.	▌ ✓ Derek Kilmer (Democratic) 59.3%; ▌Elizabeth Kreiselmaier (Republican) 40.5%
Washington 7	D+33	Pramila Jayapal	Democratic	2016	Incumbent re-elected.	▌ ✓ Pramila Jayapal (Democratic) 83.0%; ▌Craig Keller (Republican) 16.8%
Washington 8	Even	Kim Schrier	Democratic	2018	Incumbent re-elected.	▌ ✓ Kim Schrier (Democratic) 51.7%; ▌Jesse Jensen (Republican) 48.2%
Washington 9	D+21	Adam Smith	Democratic	1996	Incumbent re-elected.	▌ ✓ Adam Smith (Democratic) 74.1%; ▌Doug Basler (Republican) 25.7%
Washington 10	D+5	Denny Heck	Democratic	2012	Incumbent retired to run for lieutenant governor of Washington. Democratic hold.	▌ ✓ Marilyn Strickland (Democratic) 49.3%; ▌Beth Doglio (Democratic) 35.6%

== West Virginia ==
West Virginia's results

District		Incumbent			This race	
Location	PVI	Member	Party	First elected	Results	Candidates
West Virginia 1	R+19	David McKinley	Republican	2010	Incumbent re-elected.	▌ ✓ David McKinley (Republican) 69.0%; ▌Natalie Cline (Democratic) 31.0%
West Virginia 2	R+17	Alex Mooney	Republican	2014	Incumbent re-elected.	▌ ✓ Alex Mooney (Republican) 63.1%; ▌Cathy Kunkel (Democratic) 36.9%
West Virginia 3	R+23	Carol Miller	Republican	2018	Incumbent re-elected.	▌ ✓ Carol Miller (Republican) 71.3%; ▌Hilary Turner (Democratic) 28.7%

== Wisconsin ==
Wisconsin's results

District		Incumbent			This race	
Location	PVI	Member	Party	First elected	Results	Candidates
Wisconsin 1	R+5	Bryan Steil	Republican	2018	Incumbent re-elected.	▌ ✓ Bryan Steil (Republican) 59.3%; ▌Roger Polack (Democratic) 40.6%
Wisconsin 2	D+18	Mark Pocan	Democratic	2012	Incumbent re-elected.	▌ ✓ Mark Pocan (Democratic) 69.7%; ▌Peter Theron (Republican) 30.2%
Wisconsin 3	Even	Ron Kind	Democratic	1996	Incumbent re-elected.	▌ ✓ Ron Kind (Democratic) 51.3%; ▌Derrick Van Orden (Republican) 48.6%
Wisconsin 4	D+25	Gwen Moore	Democratic	2004	Incumbent re-elected.	▌ ✓ Gwen Moore (Democratic) 74.7%; ▌Tim Rogers (Republican) 22.7%; ▌Robert Raymond (Independent) 2.5%
Wisconsin 5	R+13	Jim Sensenbrenner	Republican	1978	Incumbent retired. Republican hold.	▌ ✓ Scott Fitzgerald (Republican) 60.1%; ▌Tom Palzewicz (Democratic) 39.8%
Wisconsin 6	R+8	Glenn Grothman	Republican	2014	Incumbent re-elected.	▌ ✓ Glenn Grothman (Republican) 59.2%; ▌Jessica King (Democratic) 40.7%
Wisconsin 7	R+8	Tom Tiffany	Republican	2020 (special)	Incumbent re-elected.	▌ ✓ Tom Tiffany (Republican) 60.7%; ▌Tricia Zunker (Democratic) 39.2%
Wisconsin 8	R+7	Mike Gallagher	Republican	2016	Incumbent re-elected.	▌ ✓ Mike Gallagher (Republican) 64.2%; ▌Amanda Stuck (Democratic) 35.8%

== Wyoming ==
Wyoming's result by county

District		Incumbent			This race	
Location	PVI	Member	Party	First elected	Results	Candidates
Wyoming at-large	R+25	Liz Cheney	Republican	2016	Incumbent re-elected.	▌ ✓ Liz Cheney (Republican) 68.6%; ▌Lynnette Grey Bull (Democratic) 24.6%; ▌Richard Brubaker (Libertarian) 3.8%; ▌Jeff Haggit (Constitution) 2.9%

== Non-voting delegates ==
=== American Samoa ===
District	Incumbent			This race	
District	Delegate	Party	First elected	Results	Candidates
American Samoa at-large	Amata Coleman Radewagen	Republican	2014	Incumbent re-elected.	▌ ✓ Amata Coleman Radewagen (Republican) 83.5%; ▌Oreta Tufuga Mapu Crichton (Democratic) 14.4%; ▌Meleagi Suitonu-Chapman (Democratic) 2.1%

=== District of Columbia ===
District	Incumbent			This race	
District	Delegate	Party	First elected	Results	Candidates
District of Columbia at-large	Eleanor Holmes Norton	Democratic	1990	Incumbent re-elected.	▌ ✓ Eleanor Holmes Norton (Democratic) 86.83%; ▌Patrick Hynes (Libertarian) 2.82%; ▌Barbara Washington Franklin (Independent) 2.24%; ▌Omari Musa (Socialist Workers) 1.92%; ▌Natale Lino Stracuzzi (DC Statehood Green) 1.68%; ▌Amir Lowery (Independent) 1.51%; ▌David Krucoff (Independent) 1.43%; ▌John Cheeks (Independent) 0.88%

=== Guam ===
District	Incumbent			This race	
District	Delegate	Party	First elected	Results	Candidates
Guam at-large	Michael San Nicolas	Democratic	2018	Incumbent re-elected in a November 17, 2020 run-off election.	First round: ▌ Michael San Nicolas (Democratic) 45.95%; ▌ Robert Underwood (Democratic) 32.87%; ▌Wil Castro (Republican) 21.0%; Second round: ▌ ✓ Michael San Nicolas (Democratic) 59.61%; ▌Robert Underwood (Democratic) 40.39%

=== Northern Mariana Islands ===
District	Incumbent			This race	
District	Delegate	Party	First elected	Results	Candidates
Northern Mariana Islands at-large	Gregorio Sablan	Independent	2008	Incumbent re-elected.	▌ ✓ Gregorio Sablan (Independent) 100%

=== Puerto Rico ===
The Resident Commissioner of Puerto Rico is the only member of the United States House of Representatives who is elected for a four-year term.

District	Incumbent			This race	
District	Delegate	Party	First elected	Results	Candidates
Puerto Rico at-large	Jenniffer González	New Progressive/ Republican	2016	Incumbent re-elected.	▌ ✓ Jenniffer González (PNP/Republican) 40.67%; ▌Aníbal Acevedo Vilá (PPD/Democratic) 31.98%; ▌Zayira Jordán Conde (MVC) 13.01%; ▌Ada Norah Henriquez (Project Dignity) 7.94%; ▌Luis Roberto Piñero (PIP) 6.39%

=== United States Virgin Islands ===
District	Incumbent			This race	
District	Delegate	Party	First elected	Results	Candidates
United States Virgin Islands at-large	Stacey Plaskett	Democratic	2014	Incumbent re-elected.	▌ ✓ Stacey Plaskett (Democratic) 88.09%; ▌Shekema George (Independent) 11.34%

== See also ==
- 2020 United States elections
  - 2020 United States Senate elections
- 116th United States Congress
- 117th United States Congress
  - List of new members of the 117th United States Congress
