= Gina Mason =

American politician (1959–2017)

Member of the Maine House of Representatives from the 56th district
- In office December 7, 2016 – September 5, 2017
- Preceded by: Dale Crafts
- Succeeded by: Rick Mason

Personal details
- Born: Gina Marie Crafts; December 30, 1959 Lewiston, Maine
- Died: September 5, 2017 (aged 57) Lisbon Falls, Maine
- Party: Republican
- Spouse: Rick Mason
- Children: 2
- Relatives: Garrett Mason (son)
- Education: Westbrook College
- Occupation: Businesswoman, politician

Gina Marie Mason (née Crafts; December 30, 1959 – September 5, 2017) was an American politician.

Mason was born in Lewiston, Maine, the daughter of Chauncey and Carmella DeBurra Crafts. She lived in Lisbon, Maine and graduated from Lisbon High School in 1978. In 1980, Mason graduated from Westbrook College with a degree in fashion merchandising and retail buying. She was involved with the fashion business. She served on the Lisbon Town Board and the Lisbon School Committee. She served in the Maine House of Representatives in 2017 and was a Republican. Her son Garrett Mason and their cousin Dale J. Crafts also served in the Maine Legislature. Gina Mason died suddenly while still in office on September 5, 2017. She was 57 years old. Her husband Rick Mason succeeded his wife to the Maine Legislature.
