= Rick Mason =

American businessman and politician from Maine

Member of the Maine House of Representatives
- Incumbent
- Assumed office December 6, 2017
- Preceded by: Gina Mason
- Constituency: 56th district (2017–2022); 97th district (2022–present)

Personal details
- Party: Republican
- Spouse: Gina Mason
- Children: 2, including Garrett Mason
- Occupation: Businessman, politician

Richard G. Mason is an American businessman and politician from Maine. Mason is a Republican member of Maine House of Representatives for District 97.

== Early life ==
Mason graduated from Lisbon High School.

== Career ==
As a businessman, Mason is the owner of Rick Mason Excavation business.

In November 2017, Mason won a special election and became a Republican member of Maine House of Representatives for District 56. Mason succeeded his wife Gina Mason who died suddenly.

== Personal life ==
Mason's wife was Gina Mason, a former Maine state representative. They have two children, including former Maine state Senator Garrett Mason. Mason and his family live in Lisbon Falls, Maine.

== See also ==
- Dale Crafts
