= Dale Crafts =

American politician and businessman

Member of the Maine House of Representatives
- In office December 3, 2008 – December 7, 2016
- Preceded by: Robert Berube
- Succeeded by: Gina Mason
- Constituency: 104th district (2008–2014); 56th district (2014–2016)

Personal details
- Born: Dale John Crafts; December 14, 1958 (age 67) Fort Lauderdale, Florida, U.S.
- Party: Republican

Dale John Crafts (born December 14, 1958) is an American politician and businessman. He has started a number of businesses, including Mobility Plus, which helps people with disabilities drive more easily. Crafts was on the Lisbon, Maine Town Council before winning election to the Maine House of Representatives, where he served from 2008 to 2016.

In 2020, Crafts was the Republican nominee in his unsuccessful bid against Jared Golden for the U.S. House in Maine's 2nd congressional district. He has been paralyzed from the waist down since the age of 25, when he was hit by a driver while riding his motorcycle.

== Early life and family ==
Crafts was born in Fort Lauderdale, Florida, and raised in Lisbon Falls, Maine.

Crafts' cousins: Garrett Mason, Gina Mason, and Rick Mason also served in the Maine Legislature.

== Business career ==
After he was paralyzed in a motorcycle accident at age 25, Crafts started a company called Mobility Plus, which helps people with disabilities drive more easily. Crafts has started a number of other businesses, including a self-storage business.

== 2020 U.S. House election ==
Crafts became the Republican nominee for Maine's 2nd congressional district in 2020 after defeating realtor Adrienne Bennett and former state Senator Eric Brakey in a three-way primary election. President Donald Trump endorsed Crafts on August 1, 2020. As Maine uses ranked-choice voting, he was in first place with just under 46% of the vote in the first round. In the second round, he won with 58.5% of the vote. He faced Democratic incumbent Jared Golden in the general election. On November 3, 2020, Golden won reelection with 53% of the vote to Crafts' 47%.

Maine House of Representatives
Preceded by Robert Berube	Member of the Maine House of Representatives from the 104th district 2008–2014	Succeeded by Raymond Wallace
Preceded by Corey Wilson	Member of the Maine House of Representatives from the 56th district 2014–2016	Succeeded by Gina Mason
