= List of new members of the 109th United States Congress =

The 109th United States Congress began on January 3, 2005. There were nine new senators (two Democrats, seven Republicans) and 40 new representatives (16 Democrats, 24 Republicans) at the start of its first session. Additionally, one senator (a Democrat) and six representatives (two Democrats, four Republicans) took office on various dates in order to fill vacancies during the 109th Congress before it ended on January 3, 2007.

== Senate ==
=== Took office January 3, 2005 ===
State	Image	Senator	Seniority	Switched party	Prior background	Birth year
Colorado		Ken Salazar (D)	9th (100th overall)	Yes; Open seat; replaced Ben Nighthorse Campbell (R)	Attorney General of Colorado	1955
Florida		Mel Martinez (R)	7th (98th overall)	Yes; Open seat; replaced Bob Graham (D)	U.S. Secretary of Housing and Urban Development; Mayor of Orange County	1946
Georgia		Johnny Isakson (R)	5th (96th overall)	Yes; Open seat; replaced Zell Miller (D)	U.S. House of Representatives (Note: Elected to the 106th Congress, serving from 1999 to 2005 in Georgia's 6th congressional district.); Georgia Senate; Georgia House of Representatives	1944
Illinois		Barack Obama (D)	8th (99th overall)	Yes; Open seat; replaced Peter Fitzgerald (R)	Illinois Senate	1961
Louisiana		David Vitter (R)	6th (97th overall)	Yes; Open seat; replaced John Breaux (D)	U.S. House of Representatives (Note: Elected to the 106th Congress, serving from 1999 to 2005 in Louisiana's 1st congressional district.); Louisiana House of Representatives	1961
North Carolina		Richard Burr (R)	1st (92nd overall)	Yes; Open seat; replaced John Edwards (D)	U.S. House of Representatives (Note: Elected to the 104th Congress, serving from 1995 to 2005 in North Carolina's 5th congressional district.)	1955
Oklahoma		Tom Coburn (R)	3rd (94th overall)	No; Open seat; replaced Don Nickles (R)	U.S. House of Representatives (Note: Elected to the 104th Congress, serving from 1995 to 2005 in Oklahoma's 2nd congressional district.)	1948
South Carolina		Jim DeMint (R)	2nd (93rd overall)	Yes; Open seat; replaced Ernest Hollings (D)	U.S. House of Representatives (Note: Elected to the 106th Congress, serving from 1999 to 2005 in South Carolina's 4th congressional district.)	1951
South Dakota		John Thune (R)	4th (95th overall)	Yes; Defeated Tom Daschle (D)	U.S. House of Representatives (Note: Elected to the 105th Congress, serving from 1997 to 2003 in South Dakota's at-large congressional district.)	1961

=== Took office during the 109th Congress ===
State	Image	Senator	Took office	Switched party	Prior background	Birth year
New Jersey		Bob Menendez (D)	January 18, 2006	No; Appointed; replaced Jon Corzine (D)	U.S. House of Representatives (Note: Elected to the 103rd Congress, serving from 1993 to 2006 in New Jersey's 13th congressional district.); New Jersey Senate; New Jersey General Assembly	1954

== House of Representatives ==
=== Took office January 3, 2005 ===
District	Representative	Switched party	Prior background	Birth year
California 3	Daniel Lungren (R)	No	Former Congressman (Note: Previously elected to the 96th Congress, serving in the California's 34th congressional district from 1979 to 1983, and in the California's 42nd congressional district from 1983 to 1989.)	1946
California 20	Jim Costa (D)	No	Family farmer	1952
Colorado 3	John Salazar (D)	Yes	Soldier	1953
Florida 14	Connie Mack IV (R)	No	State Representative	1967
Florida 20	Debbie Wasserman Schultz (D)	No	State Representative State Senator	1966
Georgia 4	Cynthia McKinney (D)	No	Former Congresswoman (Note: Previously elected to the 103rd Congress, serving in the Georgia's 11th congressional district from 1993 to 1997, and in the Georgia's 4th congressional district from 1997 to 2003.)	1955
Georgia 6	Tom Price (R)	No	State Senator	1954
Georgia 8	Lynn Westmoreland (R)	No	State Representative	1950
Georgia 12	John Barrow (D)	Yes	Athens City Council, Athens County Commissioner	1955
Illinois 3	Dan Lipinski (D)	No	Political assistant, college professor	1966
Illinois 8	Melissa Bean (D)	Yes	Sales executive	1962
Indiana 9	Mike Sodrel (R)	Yes	Guardsman, automotive executive	1945
Kentucky 4	Geoff Davis (R)	Yes	Ranger, manufacturing consultant	1958
Louisiana 1	Bobby Jindal (R)	No	Consultant	1971
Louisiana 3	Charlie Melancon (D)	Yes	State Representative, Small business owner	1947
Louisiana 7	Charles Boustany (R)	Yes	Surgeon	1956
Michigan 7	Joe Schwarz (R)	No	Physician	1937
Missouri 3	Russ Carnahan (D)	No	State Representative	1958
Missouri 5	Emanuel Cleaver (D)	No	Mayor of Kansas City, Minister	1944
Nebraska 1	Jeff Fortenberry (R)	No	Publishing executive, economist	1960
New York 27	Brian Higgins (D)	Yes	Buffalo Common Councilman, State Representative, Political assistant	1959
New York 29	Randy Kuhl (R)	No	State Representative, State Senator, attorney	1943
North Carolina 5	Virginia Foxx (R)	No	State Senator, college professor/administrator	1943
North Carolina 10	Patrick McHenry (R)	No	State Representative, realtor	1975
Oklahoma 2	Dan Boren (D)	No	State Representative	1973
Pennsylvania 8	Mike Fitzpatrick (R)	No	Member of the Bucks County Board of Commissioners, Attorney	1963
Pennsylvania 13	Allyson Schwartz (D)	No	State Senator	1948
Pennsylvania 15	Charlie Dent (R)	No	State Representative State Senator	1960
South Carolina 4	Bob Inglis (R)	No	Former Congressman (Note: Previously elected to the 103rd Congress, serving from 1993 to 1999.), Attorney	1959
Texas 1	Louie Gohmert (R)	Yes	Soldier	1953
Texas 2	Ted Poe (R)	Yes	Prosecutor, judge Harris County, Airmen	1948
Texas 9	Al Green (D)	No	Justice of the Peace Harris County, attorney	1947
Texas 10	Michael McCaul (R)	Yes	Federal prosecutor	1952
Texas 11	Mike Conaway (R)	Yes	Soldier	1948
Texas 24	Kenny Marchant (R)	Yes	State Representative	1951
Texas 28	Henry Cuellar (D)	No	State Representative, Secretary of State Texas,	1955
Virginia 2	Thelma Drake (R)	No	State Representative, realtor	1949
Washington 5	Cathy McMorris (R)	No	State Representative, orchardist	1969
Washington 8	Dave Reichert (R)	No	Sheriff King County, Airmen	1950
Wisconsin 4	Gwen Moore (D)	No	State Representative, State Senate, civic affairs specialist	1951

==== Non-voting members ====
District	Delegate	Switched party	Prior background	Birth year
Puerto Rico at-large	Luis Fortuño (PNP/R)	Yes	Secretary of Economic Development and Commerce of Puerto Rico	1960

=== Took office during the 109th Congress ===
District	Representative	Took office	Switched party	Prior background	Birth year
California 5	Doris Matsui (D)	March 10, 2005	No	White House staffer	1944
Ohio 2	Jean Schmidt (R)	September 6, 2005	No	State Representative	1951
California 48	John Campbell (R)	December 7, 2005	No	State Senator	1955
California 50	Brian Bilbray (R)	June 13, 2006	No	U.S. House of Representatives	1951
New Jersey 13	Albio Sires (D)	November 13, 2006	No	State Assemblyman	1951
Texas 22	Shelley Sekula-Gibbs (R)	November 13, 2006	No	City Councilor	1953

== See also ==
- List of United States representatives in the 109th Congress
- List of United States senators in the 109th Congress

Preceded by New members of the 108th Congress	New members of the 109th Congress; 2005–2007	Succeeded by New members of the 110th Congress
