= List of new members of the 110th United States Congress =

The 110th United States Congress began on January 3, 2007. There were 10 new senators (eight Democrats, one Republican, one independent) and 54 new representatives (41 Democrats, 13 Republicans) at the start of its first session. Additionally, two senators (both Republicans) and 13 representatives (nine Democrats, four Republicans) took office on various dates in order to fill vacancies during the 110th Congress before it ended on January 3, 2009.

The representatives comprise a diverse group reflecting the multiculturalism of the United States. One representative graduated with a high school class of 25; another is said to have a net worth of $50 million. Backgrounds include teachers, musicians, authors, engineers, a vice admiral, and a professional football player. Religions include Christianity, Buddhism, Judaism, and Islam (none claims to be atheist or agnostic). When taking office, ages ranged from 33 to 66, placing the class mostly in the baby boomer and generation X categories. Of this group 12 are female.

== Senate ==
=== Took office January 3, 2007 ===
State	Image	Senator	Seniority	Party change	Prior background	Birth year
Maryland		Ben Cardin (D)	1st (91st overall)	No; Open seat; replaced Paul Sarbanes (D)	U.S. House of Representatives (Note: Elected to the 100th Congress, serving from 1987 to 2007 in Maryland's 3rd congressional district.); Maryland House of Delegates	1943
Minnesota		Amy Klobuchar (DFL)	8th (98th overall)	No; Open seat; replaced Mark Dayton (DFL)	Hennepin County Prosecuting Attorney	1960
Missouri		Claire McCaskill (D)	7th (97th overall)	Yes; Defeated Jim Talent (R)	State Auditor of Missouri; Jackson County Prosecutor; Missouri House of Representatives	1953
Montana		Jon Tester (D)	10th (100th overall)	Yes; Defeated Conrad Burns (R)	Montana Senate	1956
Ohio		Sherrod Brown (D)	3rd (93rd overall)	Yes; Defeated Mike DeWine (R)	U.S. House of Representatives (Note: Elected to the 103rd Congress, serving from 1993 to 2007 in Ohio's 13th congressional district.); Secretary of State of Ohio; Ohio House of Representatives	1952
Pennsylvania		Bob Casey Jr. (D)	4th (94th overall)	Yes; Defeated Rick Santorum (R)	Pennsylvania Treasurer; Pennsylvania Auditor General	1960
Rhode Island		Sheldon Whitehouse (D)	9th (99th overall)	Yes; Defeated Lincoln Chafee (R)	Attorney General of Rhode Island; U.S. Attorney for Rhode Island	1955
Tennessee		Bob Corker (R)	6th (96th overall)	No; Open Seat; replaced Bill Frist (R)	Mayor of Chattanooga	1952
Vermont		Bernie Sanders (I)	2nd (92nd overall)	No; Open seat; replaced Jim Jeffords (I)	U.S. House of Representatives (Note: Elected to the 102nd Congress, serving from 1991 to 2007 in Vermont's at-large congressional district.); Mayor of Burlington	1941
Virginia		Jim Webb (D)	5th (95th overall)	Yes; Defeated George Allen (R)	U.S. Secretary of the Navy; Assistant Secretary of Defense	1946

=== Took office during the 110th Congress ===
State	Image	Senator	Took office	Party change	Prior background	Birth year
Wyoming		John Barrasso (R)	June 25, 2007	No; Appointed; replaced Craig Thomas (R)	Wyoming Senate	1952
Mississippi		Roger Wicker (R)	December 31, 2007	No; Appointed; replaced Trent Lott (R)	U.S. House of Representatives (Note: Elected to the 104th Congress, serving from 1995 to 2007 in Mississippi's 1st congressional district.); Mississippi Senate	1951

== House of Representatives ==
=== Took office January 3, 2007 ===
District	Image	Representative	Party change	Prior background	Birth year
Arizona 5		Harry Mitchell (D)	Yes	Mayor of Tempe	1940
Arizona 8		Gabby Giffords (D)	Yes	State Senator	1970
California 11		Jerry McNerney (D)	Yes	Engineer	1951
California 22		Kevin McCarthy (R)	No	State Assemblyman	1965
Colorado 5		Doug Lamborn (R)	No	State Senator	1954
Colorado 7		Ed Perlmutter (D)	Yes	State Senator	1953
Connecticut 2		Joe Courtney (D)	Yes	State Representative	1953
Connecticut 5		Chris Murphy (D)	Yes	State Senator	1973
Florida 9		Gus Bilirakis (R)	No	State Representative	1963
Florida 11		Kathy Castor (D)	No	Hillsborough County Commissioner	1966
Florida 13		Vern Buchanan (R)	No	Business owner	1951
Florida 16		Tim Mahoney (D)	Yes	COO of vFinance	1956
Florida 22		Ron Klein (D)	Yes	State Senator	1957
Georgia 4		Hank Johnson (D)	No	County Commissioner	1954
Hawaii 2		Mazie Hirono (D)	No	Lieutenant Governor	1947
Idaho 1		Bill Sali (R)	No	State Representative	1954
Illinois 6		Peter Roskam (R)	No	State Senator	1961
Illinois 17		Phil Hare (D)	No	Union President	1949
Indiana 2		Joe Donnelly (D)	Yes	Lawyer	1955
Indiana 8		Brad Ellsworth (D)	Yes	Vanderburgh County Sheriff	1958
Indiana 9		Baron Hill (D)	Yes	former U.S. Representative (Note: Previously elected to the 106th Congress, serving from 1999 to 2005.)	1953
Iowa 1		Bruce Braley (D)	Yes	Lawyer	1957
Iowa 2		Dave Loebsack (D)	Yes	Political Science Professor	1952
Kansas 2		Nancy Boyda (D)	Yes	Chemist	1955
Kentucky 3		John Yarmuth (D)	Yes	Publisher	1947
Maryland 3		John Sarbanes (D)	No	Lawyer	1962
Michigan 7		Tim Walberg (R)	No	State Representative	1951
Minnesota 1		Tim Walz (D)	Yes	Teacher	1964
Minnesota 5		Keith Ellison (D)	No	State Representative	1963
Minnesota 6		Michele Bachmann (R)	No	State Senator	1956
Nebraska 3		Adrian Smith (R)	No	State Legislator	1970
Nevada 2		Dean Heller (R)	No	Secretary of State	1960
New Hampshire 1		Carol Shea-Porter (D)	Yes	Social Worker	1954
New Hampshire 2		Paul Hodes (D)	Yes	Assistant State Attorney General	1951
New York 11		Yvette D. Clarke (D)	No	New York City Council member	1964
New York 19		John Hall (D)	Yes	Musician	1948
New York 20		Kirsten Gillibrand (D)	Yes	Lawyer	1966
New York 24		Michael Arcuri (D)	Yes	Oneida County District Attorney	1959
North Carolina 11		Heath Shuler (D)	Yes	Real estate professional and former NFL player	1971
Ohio 4		Jim Jordan (R)	No	State Senator	1964
Ohio 6		Charlie Wilson (D)	No	State Senator	1943
Ohio 13		Betty Sutton (D)	No	State Representative	1963
Ohio 18		Zack Space (D)	Yes	City Law Director	1961
Oklahoma 5		Mary Fallin (R)	No	Lieutenant Governor	1954
Pennsylvania 4		Jason Altmire (D)	Yes	Healthcare Executive	1968
Pennsylvania 7		Joe Sestak (D)	Yes	Navy vice admiral	1951
Pennsylvania 8		Patrick Murphy (D)	Yes	Professor	1973
Pennsylvania 10		Chris Carney (D)	Yes	Associate Professor	1959
Tennessee 1		David Davis (R)	No	State Representative	1959
Tennessee 9		Steve Cohen (D)	No	State Senator	1949
Texas 22		Nick Lampson (D)	Yes	former U.S. Representative (Note: Previously elected to the 105th Congress, serving from 1997 to 2005 in Texas's 9th congressional district.)	1945
Texas 23		Ciro Rodriguez (D)	Yes	former U.S. Representative (Note: Previously elected to the 105th Congress, serving from 1997 to 2005 in Texas's 28th congressional district.)	1946
Vermont At-Large		Peter Welch (D)	Yes/No (Note: Welch replaced Bernie Sanders, and Independent who caucused with the Democrats, so no functional party shift.)	State Senator	1947
Wisconsin 8		Steve Kagen (D)	Yes	Medical Doctor	1949

=== Took office during the 110th Congress ===
District	Representative	Took office	Party change	Prior background	Birth year
Georgia 10	Paul Broun (R)	July 17, 2007	No	Medical Doctor	1946
California 37	Laura Richardson (D)	August 21, 2007	No	State Assemblywoman	1962
Massachusetts 5	Niki Tsongas (D)	October 16, 2007	No	College dean	1946
Ohio 5	Bob Latta (R)	December 11, 2007	No	State Representative	1956
Virginia 1	Rob Wittman (R)	December 11, 2007	No	State Delegate	1959
Illinois 14	Bill Foster (D)	March 8, 2008	Yes	Physicist	1955
Indiana 7	André Carson (D)	March 11, 2008	No	City Councilor	1974
Mississippi 1	Travis Childers (D)	May 13, 2008	Yes	County Clerk	1958
Louisiana 1	Steve Scalise (R)	May 3, 2008	No	State Senator	1965
Louisiana 6	Don Cazayoux (D)	May 3, 2008	Yes	State Representative	1964
California 12	Jackie Speier (D)	May 14, 2008	No	State Senator	1950
Maryland 4	Donna Edwards (D)	June 17, 2008	No	Community activist	1958
Ohio 11	Marcia Fudge (D)	November 18, 2008	No	Mayor of Warrensville Heights	1952

== See also ==
- List of United States representatives in the 110th Congress
- List of United States senators in the 110th Congress

== Notes ==
Preceded by New members of the 109th Congress	New members of the 110th Congress; 2007–2009	Succeeded by New members of the 111th Congress
