= 2005 California's 5th congressional district special election =

- March 8, 2005
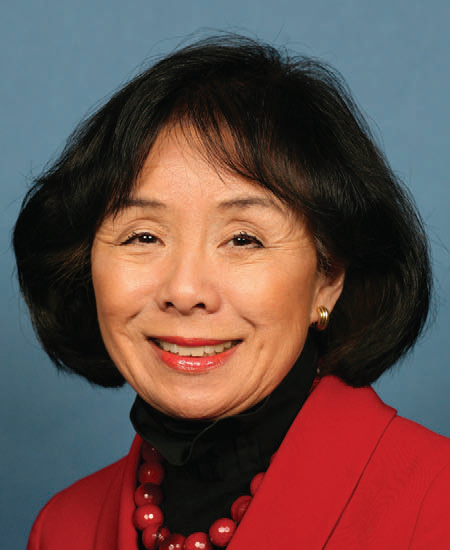

Nominee	Doris Matsui	Julie Padilla	John Flynn
Party	Democratic	Democratic	Republican
Popular vote	56,175	7,158	6,559
Percentage	67.65%	8.62%	7.90%
U.S. Representative before election
Bob Matsui
Democratic
Elected U.S. Representative
Doris Matsui
Democratic

On March 8, 2005, a special election was held in the California's 5th congressional district to choose a U.S. Representative to replace Bob Matsui, who had died of pneumonia shortly after being re-elected in the 2004 elections. Matsui's wife, Doris, was quickly able to win support from the Democratic Party officials, and ended up winning over two-thirds of the vote in the special primary election, meaning a run-off would not be needed. Until 2021, this would be the last time a widow succeeded their spouse in Congress. (Note: In 2020, Luke Letlow was elected to represent Louisiana but died before he could be sworn in. The special election to fill his vacant seat was won by his widow, Julia Letlow.)

== Results ==
California's 5th congressional district special election, 2005
Party	Candidate	Votes	%
Democratic	Doris Matsui	56,175	67.65
Democratic	Julie Padilla	7,158	8.62
Republican	John Flynn	6,559	7.90
Republican	Serge Chernay	3,742	4.51
Republican	Michael O'Brien	2,591	3.12
Republican	Shane Singh	1,753	2.11
Republican	Bruce Stevens	1,124	1.35
Green	Pat Driscoll	976	1.18
Independent	Leonard Padilla	916	1.10
Democratic	Charles Pineda	659	0.79
Libertarian	Gale Morgan	451	0.54
Peace and Freedom	John Reiger	286	0.34
Democratic	Lara Shapiro (write-in)	6	0.01
Invalid or blank votes		637	0.77
Total votes		83,033	100.00
Turnout			27.72
Democratic hold			
