= List of United States representatives in the 110th Congress =

This is a complete list of United States representatives during the 110th United States Congress (January 3, 2007 – January 3, 2009) listed by seniority.

Seniority depends on the date in which members were sworn into office. Since many members are sworn in on the same day, subsequent ranking is based on previous congressional service of the individual and then by alphabetical order by the last name of the representative.

Committee chairmanship in the House is often associated with seniority. However, party leadership is typically not associated with seniority.

Note: The "*" indicates that the representative/delegate may have served one or more non-consecutive terms while in the House of Representatives of the United States Congress.

== U.S. House seniority list ==
U.S. House seniority
Rank	Representative	Party	District	Seniority date (Previous service, if any)	Term #	Notes
1	John Dingell	D	MI-15	December 13, 1955	27th term	Dean of the House
2	John Conyers	D	MI-14	January 3, 1965	22nd term	Chair of the Judiciary Committee; Dean of the Congressional Black Caucus
3	Dave Obey	D	WI-07	April 1, 1969	20th term	Chair of the Appropriations Committee
4	Charles Rangel	D	NY-15	January 3, 1971	19th term	Chair of the Ways and Means Committee
5	Bill Young	R	FL-10	January 3, 1971	19th term	
6	Ralph Regula	R	OH-16	January 3, 1973	18th term	Left the House in 2009
7	Pete Stark	D	CA-13	January 3, 1973	18th term	
8	Don Young	R	AK-AL	March 6, 1973	18th term	Ranking member of the Natural Resources Committee
9	John Murtha	D	PA-12	February 5, 1974	18th term	
10	George Miller	D	CA-07	January 3, 1975	17th term	Chair of the Education and Labor Committee
11	Jim Oberstar	D	MN-08	January 3, 1975	17th term	Chair of the Transportation and Infrastructure Committee
12	Henry Waxman	D	CA-30	January 3, 1975	17th term	Chair of the Energy and Commerce Committee
13	Ed Markey	D	MA-07	November 2, 1976	17th term	Chair of the Select Committee on Energy Independence and Global Warming
14	Norm Dicks	D	WA-06	January 3, 1977	16th term	
15	Dale Kildee	D	MI-05	January 3, 1977	16th term	
16	Nick Rahall	D	WV-03	January 3, 1977	16th term	Chair of the Natural Resources Committee
17	Ike Skelton	D	MO-04	January 3, 1977	16th term	Chair of the Armed Services Committee
18	Jerry Lewis	R	CA-41	January 3, 1979	15th term	Ranking member of the Appropriations Committee
19	Jim Sensenbrenner	R	WI-05	January 3, 1979	15th term	Ranking member of the Select Committee on Energy Independence and Global Warming
20	Tom Petri	R	WI-06	April 3, 1979	15th term	
21	David Dreier	R	CA-26	January 3, 1981	14th term	Ranking member of the Rules Committee
22	Barney Frank	D	MA-04	January 3, 1981	14th term	Chair of the Financial Services Committee
23	Ralph Hall	R	TX-04	January 3, 1981	14th term	Ranking member of the Science and Technology Committee
24	Duncan L. Hunter	R	CA-52	January 3, 1981	14th term	Ranking member of the Armed Services Committee; Left the House in 2009
25	Tom Lantos	D	CA-12	January 3, 1981	14th term	Died on February 11, 2008.
26	Hal Rogers	R	KY-05	January 3, 1981	14th term	
27	Chris Smith	R	NJ-04	January 3, 1981	14th term	
28	Frank Wolf	R	VA-10	January 3, 1981	14th term	
29	Steny Hoyer	D	MD-05	May 19, 1981	14th term	Majority Leader
30	Howard Berman	D	CA-28	January 3, 1983	13th term	Chair of the Foreign Affairs Committee
31	Rick Boucher	D	VA-09	January 3, 1983	13th term	
32	Dan Burton	R	IN-05	January 3, 1983	13th term	
33	Marcy Kaptur	D	OH-09	January 3, 1983	13th term	Senior Woman in the US House of Representatives
34	Sander Levin	D	MI-12	January 3, 1983	13th term	
35	Alan Mollohan	D	WV-01	January 3, 1983	13th term	
36	Solomon P. Ortiz	D	TX-27	January 3, 1983	13th term	Dean of the Congressional Hispanic Caucus
37	John Spratt	D	SC-05	January 3, 1983	13th term	Chair of the Budget Committee
38	Edolphus Towns	D	NY-10	January 3, 1983	13th term	Chair of the Oversight and Government Reform Committee
39	Gary Ackerman	D	NY-05	March 1, 1983	13th term	
40	Jim Saxton	R	NJ-03	November 6, 1984	13th term	Left the House in 2009
41	Joe Barton	R	TX-06	January 3, 1985	12th term	Ranking member of the Energy and Commerce Committee
42	Howard Coble	R	NC-06	January 3, 1985	12th term	
43	Bart Gordon	D	TN-06	January 3, 1985	12th term	Chair of the Science and Technology Committee
44	Paul Kanjorski	D	PA-11	January 3, 1985	12th term	
45	Pete Visclosky	D	IN-01	January 3, 1985	12th term	
46	Richard Baker	R	LA-06	January 3, 1987	11th term	Resigned on February 2, 2008.
47	Peter DeFazio	D	OR-04	January 3, 1987	11th term	
48	Elton Gallegly	R	CA-24	January 3, 1987	11th term	
49	Dennis Hastert	R	IL-14	January 3, 1987	11th term	Resigned on November 26, 2007.
50	Wally Herger	R	CA-02	January 3, 1987	11th term	
51	John Lewis	D	GA-05	January 3, 1987	11th term	
52	Louise Slaughter	D	NY-28	January 3, 1987	11th term	Chair of the Rules Committee
53	Lamar Smith	R	TX-21	January 3, 1987	11th term	Ranking member of the Judiciary Committee
54	Fred Upton	R	MI-06	January 3, 1987	11th term	
55	Nancy Pelosi	D	CA-08	June 2, 1987	11th term	Speaker of the House
56	Chris Shays	R	CT-04	August 18, 1987	11th term	Left the House in 2009
57	Jim McCrery	R	LA-04	April 16, 1988	11th term	Ranking member of the Ways and Means Committee; Left the House in 2009
58	Jerry Costello	D	IL-12	August 9, 1988	11th term	
59	Jimmy Duncan	R	TN-02	November 8, 1988	11th term	
60	Frank Pallone	D	NJ-06	November 8, 1988	11th term	
61	Eliot Engel	D	NY-17	January 3, 1989	10th term	
62	Paul Gillmor	R	OH-05	January 3, 1989	10th term	Died on September 7, 2007.
63	Nita Lowey	D	NY-18	January 3, 1989	10th term	
64	Jim McDermott	D	WA-07	January 3, 1989	10th term	
65	Michael R. McNulty	D	NY-21	January 3, 1989	10th term	Left the House in 2009
66	Richard Neal	D	MA-02	January 3, 1989	10th term	
67	Donald M. Payne	D	NJ-10	January 3, 1989	10th term	
68	Dana Rohrabacher	R	CA-46	January 3, 1989	10th term	
69	Cliff Stearns	R	FL-06	January 3, 1989	10th term	
70	John S. Tanner	D	TN-08	January 3, 1989	10th term	
71	James T. Walsh	R	NY-25	January 3, 1989	10th term	Left the House in 2009
72	Ileana Ros-Lehtinen	R	FL-18	August 29, 1989	10th term	Ranking member of the Foreign Affairs Committee; The most senior Republican woman in the United States House of Representatives
73	Gene Taylor	D	MS-04	October 17, 1989	10th term	
74	José E. Serrano	D	NY-16	March 20, 1990	10th term	
75	Rob Andrews	D	NJ-01	November 6, 1990	10th term	
76	Neil Abercrombie	D	HI-01	January 3, 1991; Previous service, 1986–1987.	10th term*	
77	John Boehner	R	OH-08	January 3, 1991	9th term	Minority Leader
78	Dave Camp	R	MI-04	January 3, 1991	9th term	
79	Bud Cramer	D	AL-05	January 3, 1991	9th term	Left the House in 2009
80	Rosa DeLauro	D	CT-03	January 3, 1991	9th term	
81	John Doolittle	R	CA-04	January 3, 1991	9th term	Left the House in 2009
82	Chet Edwards	D	TX-17	January 3, 1991	9th term	
83	Wayne Gilchrest	R	MD-01	January 3, 1991	9th term	Left the House in 2009
84	Dave Hobson	R	OH-07	January 3, 1991	9th term	Left the House in 2009
85	William J. Jefferson	D	LA-02	January 3, 1991	9th term	Left the House in 2009
86	Jim Moran	D	VA-08	January 3, 1991	9th term	
87	Collin Peterson	D	MN-07	January 3, 1991	9th term	
88	Jim Ramstad	R	MN-03	January 3, 1991	9th term	Left the House in 2009
89	Maxine Waters	D	CA-35	January 3, 1991	9th term	
90	Sam Johnson	R	TX-03	May 8, 1991	9th term	
91	John Olver	D	MA-01	June 4, 1991	9th term	
92	Ed Pastor	D	AZ-04	October 3, 1991	9th term	
93	Jerry Nadler	D	NY-08	November 3, 1992	9th term	
94	Spencer Bachus	R	AL-06	January 3, 1993	8th term	Ranking member of the Financial Services Committee
95	Roscoe Bartlett	R	MD-06	January 3, 1993	8th term	
96	Xavier Becerra	D	CA-31	January 3, 1993	8th term	
97	Sanford Bishop	D	GA-02	January 3, 1993	8th term	
98	Corrine Brown	D	FL-03	January 3, 1993	8th term	
99	Steve Buyer	R	IN-04	January 3, 1993	8th term	Ranking member of the Veterans' Affairs Committee
100	Ken Calvert	R	CA-44	January 3, 1993	8th term	
101	Mike Castle	R	DE-AL	January 3, 1993	8th term	
102	Jim Clyburn	D	SC-06	January 3, 1993	8th term	Majority Whip
103	Nathan Deal	R	GA-09	January 3, 1993	8th term	
104	Lincoln Díaz-Balart	R	FL-21	January 3, 1993	8th term	
105	Anna Eshoo	D	CA-14	January 3, 1993	8th term	
106	Terry Everett	R	AL-02	January 3, 1993	8th term	Left the House in 2009
107	Bob Filner	D	CA-51	January 3, 1993	8th term	Chair of the Veterans' Affairs Committee
108	Bob Goodlatte	R	VA-06	January 3, 1993	8th term	Ranking member of the Agriculture Committee
109	Gene Green	D	TX-29	January 3, 1993	8th term	
110	Luis Gutiérrez	D	IL-04	January 3, 1993	8th term	
111	Alcee Hastings	D	FL-23	January 3, 1993	8th term	
112	Maurice Hinchey	D	NY-22	January 3, 1993	8th term	
113	Pete Hoekstra	R	MI-02	January 3, 1993	8th term	Ranking member of the Intelligence Committee
114	Tim Holden	D	PA-17	January 3, 1993	8th term	
115	Eddie Bernice Johnson	D	TX-30	January 3, 1993	8th term	
116	Peter T. King	R	NY-03	January 3, 1993	8th term	Ranking member of the Homeland Security Committee
117	Jack Kingston	R	GA-01	January 3, 1993	8th term	
118	Joe Knollenberg	R	MI-09	January 3, 1993	8th term	Left the House in 2009
119	John Linder	R	GA-07	January 3, 1993	8th term	
120	Carolyn Maloney	D	NY-14	January 3, 1993	8th term	
121	Don Manzullo	R	IL-16	January 3, 1993	8th term	
122	John M. McHugh	R	NY-23	January 3, 1993	8th term	
123	Buck McKeon	R	CA-25	January 3, 1993	8th term	Ranking member of the Education and Labor Committee
124	Marty Meehan	D	MA-05	January 3, 1993	8th term	Resigned on July 1, 2007.
125	John Mica	R	FL-07	January 3, 1993	8th term	Ranking member of the Transportation and Infrastructure Committee
126	Earl Pomeroy	D	ND-AL	January 3, 1993	8th term	
127	Deborah Pryce	R	OH-15	January 3, 1993	8th term	Left the House in 2009
128	Lucille Roybal-Allard	D	CA-34	January 3, 1993	8th term	
129	Ed Royce	R	CA-40	January 3, 1993	8th term	
130	Bobby Rush	D	IL-01	January 3, 1993	8th term	
131	Bobby Scott	D	VA-03	January 3, 1993	8th term	
132	Bart Stupak	D	MI-01	January 3, 1993	8th term	
133	Nydia Velázquez	D	NY-12	January 3, 1993	8th term	Chair of the Small Business Committee
134	Mel Watt	D	NC-12	January 3, 1993	8th term	
135	Lynn Woolsey	D	CA-06	January 3, 1993	8th term	
136	Albert Wynn	D	MD-04	January 3, 1993	8th term	Resigned on May 31, 2008.
137	Bennie Thompson	D	MS-02	April 13, 1993	8th term	Chair of the Homeland Security Committee
138	Sam Farr	D	CA-17	June 8, 1993	8th term	
139	Vern Ehlers	R	MI-03	December 7, 1993	8th term	Ranking member of the House Administration Committee
140	Frank Lucas	R	OK-03	May 10, 1994	8th term	
141	Ron Lewis	R	KY-02	May 24, 1994	8th term	Left the House in 2009
142	Steve Chabot	R	OH-01	January 3, 1995	7th term	Ranking member of the Small Business Committee; Left the House in 2009
143	Barbara Cubin	R	WY-AL	January 3, 1995	7th term	Left the House in 2009
144	Tom Davis	R	VA-11	January 3, 1995	7th term	Ranking member of the Oversight and Government Reform Committee; Resigned on November 24, 2008.
145	Lloyd Doggett	D	TX-25	January 3, 1995	7th term	
146	Mike Doyle	D	PA-14	January 3, 1995	7th term	
147	Phil English	R	PA-03	January 3, 1995	7th term	Left the House in 2009
148	Chaka Fattah	D	PA-02	January 3, 1995	7th term	
149	Rodney Frelinghuysen	R	NJ-11	January 3, 1995	7th term	
150	Doc Hastings	R	WA-04	January 3, 1995	7th term	Ranking member of the Ethics Committee
151	Sheila Jackson Lee	D	TX-18	January 3, 1995	7th term	
152	Walter B. Jones Jr.	R	NC-03	January 3, 1995	7th term	
153	Patrick J. Kennedy	D	RI-01	January 3, 1995	7th term	
154	Ray LaHood	R	IL-18	January 3, 1995	7th term	Left the House in 2009
155	Tom Latham	R	IA-04	January 3, 1995	7th term	
156	Steve LaTourette	R	OH-14	January 3, 1995	7th term	
157	Frank LoBiondo	R	NJ-02	January 3, 1995	7th term	
158	Zoe Lofgren	D	CA-16	January 3, 1995	7th term	
159	Sue Myrick	R	NC-09	January 3, 1995	7th term	
160	Charlie Norwood	R	GA-10	January 3, 1995	7th term	Died on February 13, 2007.
161	George Radanovich	R	CA-19	January 3, 1995	7th term	
162	John Shadegg	R	AZ-03	January 3, 1995	7th term	
163	Mark Souder	R	IN-03	January 3, 1995	7th term	
164	Mac Thornberry	R	TX-13	January 3, 1995	7th term	
165	Todd Tiahrt	R	KS-04	January 3, 1995	7th term	
166	Zach Wamp	R	TN-03	January 3, 1995	7th term	
167	Dave Weldon	R	FL-15	January 3, 1995	7th term	Left the House in 2009
168	Jerry Weller	R	IL-11	January 3, 1995	7th term	Left the House in 2009
169	Ed Whitfield	R	KY-01	January 3, 1995	7th term	
170	Roger Wicker	R	MS-01	January 3, 1995	7th term	Resigned on December 31, 2007.
171	Jesse Jackson Jr.	D	IL-02	December 12, 1995	7th term	
172	Juanita Millender-McDonald	D	CA-37	March 26, 1996	7th term	Died on April 22, 2007.
173	Elijah Cummings	D	MD-07	April 16, 1996	7th term	
174	Earl Blumenauer	D	OR-03	May 21, 1996	7th term	
175	Jo Ann Emerson	R	MO-08	November 5, 1996	7th term	
176	Robert Aderholt	R	AL-04	January 3, 1997	6th term	
177	Tom Allen	D	ME-01	January 3, 1997	6th term	Left the House in 2009
178	Marion Berry	D	AR-01	January 3, 1997	6th term	
179	Roy Blunt	R	MO-07	January 3, 1997	6th term	Minority Whip
180	Leonard Boswell	D	IA-03	January 3, 1997	6th term	
181	Allen Boyd	D	FL-02	January 3, 1997	6th term	
182	Kevin Brady	R	TX-08	January 3, 1997	6th term	
183	Chris Cannon	R	UT-03	January 3, 1997	6th term	Left the House in 2009
184	Julia Carson	D	IN-07	January 3, 1997	6th term	Died on December 15, 2007.
185	Danny K. Davis	D	IL-07	January 3, 1997	6th term	
186	Diana DeGette	D	CO-01	January 3, 1997	6th term	
187	Bill Delahunt	D	MA-10	January 3, 1997	6th term	
188	Bob Etheridge	D	NC-02	January 3, 1997	6th term	
189	Virgil Goode	R	VA-05	January 3, 1997	6th term	Left the House in 2009
190	Kay Granger	R	TX-12	January 3, 1997	6th term	
191	Rubén Hinojosa	D	TX-15	January 3, 1997	6th term	
192	Darlene Hooley	D	OR-05	January 3, 1997	6th term	Left the House in 2009
193	Kenny Hulshof	R	MO-09	January 3, 1997	6th term	Left the House in 2009
194	Carolyn Cheeks Kilpatrick	D	MI-13	January 3, 1997	6th term	
195	Ron Kind	D	WI-03	January 3, 1997	6th term	
196	Dennis Kucinich	D	OH-10	January 3, 1997	6th term	
197	Carolyn McCarthy	D	NY-04	January 3, 1997	6th term	
198	Jim McGovern	D	MA-03	January 3, 1997	6th term	
199	Mike McIntyre	D	NC-07	January 3, 1997	6th term	
200	Jerry Moran	R	KS-01	January 3, 1997	6th term	
201	Bill Pascrell	D	NJ-08	January 3, 1997	6th term	
202	Ron Paul	R	TX-14	January 3, 1997; Previous service, 1976–1977 and 1979–1985.	10th term**	
203	John E. Peterson	R	PA-05	January 3, 1997	6th term	Left the House in 2009
204	Chip Pickering	R	MS-03	January 3, 1997	6th term	Left the House in 2009
205	Joe Pitts	R	PA-16	January 3, 1997	6th term	
206	David Price	D	NC-04	January 3, 1997; Previous service, 1987–1995.	10th term*	
207	Silvestre Reyes	D	TX-16	January 3, 1997	6th term	Chair of the Intelligence Committee
208	Steve Rothman	D	NJ-09	January 3, 1997	6th term	
209	Loretta Sanchez	D	CA-47	January 3, 1997	6th term	
210	Pete Sessions	R	TX-32	January 3, 1997	6th term	
211	Brad Sherman	D	CA-27	January 3, 1997	6th term	
212	John Shimkus	R	IL-19	January 3, 1997	6th term	
213	Adam Smith	D	WA-09	January 3, 1997	6th term	
214	Vic Snyder	D	AR-02	January 3, 1997	6th term	
215	Ellen Tauscher	D	CA-10	January 3, 1997	6th term	
216	John F. Tierney	D	MA-06	January 3, 1997	6th term	
217	Robert Wexler	D	FL-19	January 3, 1997	6th term	
218	Vito Fossella	R	NY-13	November 4, 1997	6th term	Left the House in 2009
219	Gregory Meeks	D	NY-06	February 3, 1998	6th term	
220	Lois Capps	D	CA-23	March 10, 1998	6th term	
221	Mary Bono	R	CA-45	April 7, 1998	6th term	
222	Barbara Lee	D	CA-09	April 7, 1998	6th term	
223	Bob Brady	D	PA-01	May 19, 1998	6th term	Chair of the House Administration Committee
224	Heather Wilson	R	NM-01	June 25, 1998	6th term	Left the House in 2009
225	Brian Baird	D	WA-03	January 3, 1999	5th term	
226	Tammy Baldwin	D	WI-02	January 3, 1999	5th term	
227	Shelley Berkley	D	NV-01	January 3, 1999	5th term	
228	Judy Biggert	R	IL-13	January 3, 1999	5th term	
229	Mike Capuano	D	MA-08	January 3, 1999	5th term	
230	Joe Crowley	D	NY-07	January 3, 1999	5th term	
231	Charlie Gonzalez	D	TX-20	January 3, 1999	5th term	
232	Robin Hayes	R	NC-08	January 3, 1999	5th term	Left the House in 2009
233	Rush Holt Jr.	D	NJ-12	January 3, 1999	5th term	
234	Jay Inslee	D	WA-01	January 3, 1999; Previous service, 1993–1995.	6th term*	
235	Stephanie Tubbs Jones	D	OH-11	January 3, 1999	5th term	Died on August 20, 2008.
236	John B. Larson	D	CT-01	January 3, 1999	5th term	
237	Gary Miller	R	CA-42	January 3, 1999	5th term	
238	Dennis Moore	D	KS-03	January 3, 1999	5th term	
239	Grace Napolitano	D	CA-38	January 3, 1999	5th term	
240	Thomas M. Reynolds	R	NY-26	January 3, 1999	5th term	Left the House in 2009
241	Paul Ryan	R	WI-01	January 3, 1999	5th term	Ranking member of the Budget Committee
242	Jan Schakowsky	D	IL-09	January 3, 1999	5th term	
243	Mike Simpson	R	ID-02	January 3, 1999	5th term	
244	Tom Tancredo	R	CO-06	January 3, 1999	5th term	Left the House in 2009
245	Lee Terry	R	NE-02	January 3, 1999	5th term	
246	Mike Thompson	D	CA-01	January 3, 1999	5th term	
247	Mark Udall	D	CO-02	January 3, 1999	5th term	Left the House in 2009
248	Tom Udall	D	NM-03	January 3, 1999	5th term	Left the House in 2009
249	Greg Walden	R	OR-02	January 3, 1999	5th term	
250	Anthony Weiner	D	NY-09	January 3, 1999	5th term	
251	David Wu	D	OR-01	January 3, 1999	5th term	
252	Joe Baca	D	CA-43	November 16, 1999	5th term	
253	Todd Akin	R	MO-02	January 3, 2001	4th term	
254	Henry E. Brown Jr.	R	SC-01	January 3, 2001	4th term	
255	Eric Cantor	R	VA-07	January 3, 2001	4th term	
256	Shelley Moore Capito	R	WV-02	January 3, 2001	4th term	
257	Lacy Clay	D	MO-01	January 3, 2001	4th term	
258	Ander Crenshaw	R	FL-04	January 3, 2001	4th term	
259	John Culberson	R	TX-07	January 3, 2001	4th term	
260	Jo Ann Davis	R	VA-01	January 3, 2001	4th term	Died on October 6, 2007.
261	Susan Davis	D	CA-53	January 3, 2001	4th term	
262	Mike Ferguson	R	NJ-07	January 3, 2001	4th term	Left the House in 2009
263	Jeff Flake	R	AZ-06	January 3, 2001	4th term	
264	Sam Graves	R	MO-06	January 3, 2001	4th term	
265	Jane Harman	D	CA-36	January 3, 2001; Previous service, 1993–1999.	7th term*	
266	Mike Honda	D	CA-15	January 3, 2001	4th term	
267	Steve Israel	D	NY-02	January 3, 2001	4th term	
268	Darrell Issa	R	CA-49	January 3, 2001	4th term	
269	Tim Johnson	R	IL-15	January 3, 2001	4th term	
270	Ric Keller	R	FL-08	January 3, 2001	4th term	Left the House in 2009
271	Mark Kirk	R	IL-10	January 3, 2001	4th term	
272	James Langevin	D	RI-02	January 3, 2001	4th term	
273	Rick Larsen	D	WA-02	January 3, 2001	4th term	
274	Jim Matheson	D	UT-02	January 3, 2001	4th term	
275	Betty McCollum	D	MN-04	January 3, 2001	4th term	
276	Mike Pence	R	IN-06	January 3, 2001	4th term	
277	Todd Platts	R	PA-19	January 3, 2001	4th term	
278	Adam Putnam	R	FL-12	January 3, 2001	4th term	
279	Denny Rehberg	R	MT-AL	January 3, 2001	4th term	
280	Mike Rogers	R	MI-08	January 3, 2001	4th term	
281	Mike Ross	D	AR-04	January 3, 2001	4th term	
282	Adam Schiff	D	CA-29	January 3, 2001	4th term	
283	Hilda Solis	D	CA-32	January 3, 2001	4th term	
284	Pat Tiberi	R	OH-12	January 3, 2001	4th term	
285	Bill Shuster	R	PA-09	May 15, 2001	4th term	
286	Diane Watson	D	CA-33	June 5, 2001	4th term	
287	Randy Forbes	R	VA-04	June 19, 2001	4th term	
288	Stephen Lynch	D	MA-09	October 16, 2001	4th term	
289	Jeff Miller	R	FL-01	October 16, 2001	4th term	
290	John Boozman	R	AR-03	November 20, 2001	4th term	
291	Joe Wilson	R	SC-02	December 18, 2001	4th term	
292	John Sullivan	R	OK-01	February 15, 2002	4th term	
293	Rodney Alexander	R	LA-05	January 3, 2003	3rd term	
294	Gresham Barrett	R	SC-03	January 3, 2003	3rd term	
295	Rob Bishop	R	UT-01	January 3, 2003	3rd term	
296	Tim Bishop	D	NY-01	January 3, 2003	3rd term	
297	Marsha Blackburn	R	TN-07	January 3, 2003	3rd term	
298	Jo Bonner	R	AL-01	January 3, 2003	3rd term	
299	Ginny Brown-Waite	R	FL-05	January 3, 2003	3rd term	
300	Michael C. Burgess	R	TX-26	January 3, 2003	3rd term	
301	Dennis Cardoza	D	CA-18	January 3, 2003	3rd term	
302	John Carter	R	TX-31	January 3, 2003	3rd term	
303	Tom Cole	R	OK-04	January 3, 2003	3rd term	
304	Jim Cooper	D	TN-05	January 3, 2003; Previous service, 1983–1995.	9th term*	
305	Artur Davis	D	AL-07	January 3, 2003	3rd term	
306	Lincoln Davis	D	TN-04	January 3, 2003	3rd term	
307	Mario Díaz-Balart	R	FL-25	January 3, 2003	3rd term	
308	Rahm Emanuel	D	IL-05	January 3, 2003	3rd term	Democratic Caucus Chairman; Resigned on January 2, 2009.
309	Tom Feeney	R	FL-24	January 3, 2003	3rd term	Left the House in 2009
310	Trent Franks	R	AZ-02	January 3, 2003	3rd term	
311	Scott Garrett	R	NJ-05	January 3, 2003	3rd term	
312	Jim Gerlach	R	PA-06	January 3, 2003	3rd term	
313	Phil Gingrey	R	GA-11	January 3, 2003	3rd term	
314	Raúl Grijalva	D	AZ-07	January 3, 2003	3rd term	
315	Jeb Hensarling	R	TX-05	January 3, 2003	3rd term	
316	Steve King	R	IA-05	January 3, 2003	3rd term	
317	John Kline	R	MN-02	January 3, 2003	3rd term	
318	Jim Marshall	D	GA-08	January 3, 2003	3rd term	
319	Thaddeus McCotter	R	MI-11	January 3, 2003	3rd term	
320	Kendrick Meek	D	FL-17	January 3, 2003	3rd term	
321	Mike Michaud	D	ME-02	January 3, 2003	3rd term	
322	Brad Miller	D	NC-13	January 3, 2003	3rd term	
323	Candice Miller	R	MI-10	January 3, 2003	3rd term	
324	Tim Murphy	R	PA-18	January 3, 2003	3rd term	
325	Marilyn Musgrave	R	CO-04	January 3, 2003	3rd term	Left the House in 2009
326	Devin Nunes	R	CA-21	January 3, 2003	3rd term	
327	Steve Pearce	R	NM-02	January 3, 2003	3rd term	Left the House in 2009
328	Jon Porter	R	NV-03	January 3, 2003	3rd term	Left the House in 2009
329	Rick Renzi	R	AZ-01	January 3, 2003	3rd term	Left the House in 2009
330	Mike Rogers	R	AL-03	January 3, 2003	3rd term	
331	Dutch Ruppersberger	D	MD-02	January 3, 2003	3rd term	
332	Tim Ryan	D	OH-17	January 3, 2003	3rd term	
333	Linda Sánchez	D	CA-39	January 3, 2003	3rd term	
334	David Scott	D	GA-13	January 3, 2003	3rd term	
335	Mike Turner	R	OH-03	January 3, 2003	3rd term	
336	Chris Van Hollen	D	MD-08	January 3, 2003	3rd term	
337	Randy Neugebauer	R	TX-19	June 3, 2003	3rd term	
338	Ben Chandler	D	KY-06	February 17, 2004	3rd term	
339	Stephanie Herseth	D	SD-AL	June 1, 2004	3rd term	
340	G. K. Butterfield	D	NC-01	July 20, 2004	3rd term	
341	John Barrow	D	GA-12	January 3, 2005	2nd term	
342	Melissa Bean	D	IL-08	January 3, 2005	2nd term	
343	Dan Boren	D	OK-02	January 3, 2005	2nd term	
344	Charles Boustany	R	LA-07	January 3, 2005	2nd term	
345	Russ Carnahan	D	MO-03	January 3, 2005	2nd term	
346	Emanuel Cleaver	D	MO-05	January 3, 2005	2nd term	
347	Mike Conaway	R	TX-11	January 3, 2005	2nd term	
348	Jim Costa	D	CA-20	January 3, 2005	2nd term	
349	Henry Cuellar	D	TX-28	January 3, 2005	2nd term	
350	Geoff Davis	R	KY-04	January 3, 2005	2nd term	
351	Charlie Dent	R	PA-15	January 3, 2005	2nd term	
352	Thelma Drake	R	VA-02	January 3, 2005	2nd term	Left the House in 2009
353	Jeff Fortenberry	R	NE-01	January 3, 2005	2nd term	
354	Virginia Foxx	R	NC-05	January 3, 2005	2nd term	
355	Louie Gohmert	R	TX-01	January 3, 2005	2nd term	
356	Al Green	D	TX-09	January 3, 2005	2nd term	
357	Brian Higgins	D	NY-27	January 3, 2005	2nd term	
358	Bob Inglis	R	SC-04	January 3, 2005; Previous service, 1993–1999.	5th term*	
359	Bobby Jindal	R	LA-01	January 3, 2005	2nd term	Resigned on January 14, 2008.
360	Randy Kuhl	R	NY-29	January 3, 2005	2nd term	Left the House in 2009
361	Dan Lipinski	D	IL-03	January 3, 2005	2nd term	
362	Dan Lungren	R	CA-03	January 3, 2005; Previous service, 1979–1989.	8th term*	
363	Connie Mack IV	R	FL-14	January 3, 2005	2nd term	
364	Kenny Marchant	R	TX-24	January 3, 2005	2nd term	
365	Michael McCaul	R	TX-10	January 3, 2005	2nd term	
366	Patrick McHenry	R	NC-10	January 3, 2005	2nd term	
367	Cathy McMorris Rodgers	R	WA-05	January 3, 2005	2nd term	
368	Charlie Melançon	D	LA-03	January 3, 2005	2nd term	
369	Gwen Moore	D	WI-04	January 3, 2005	2nd term	
370	Ted Poe	R	TX-02	January 3, 2005	2nd term	
371	Tom Price	R	GA-06	January 3, 2005	2nd term	
372	Dave Reichert	R	WA-08	January 3, 2005	2nd term	
373	John Salazar	D	CO-03	January 3, 2005	2nd term	
374	Allyson Schwartz	D	PA-13	January 3, 2005	2nd term	
375	Debbie Wasserman Schultz	D	FL-20	January 3, 2005	2nd term	
376	Lynn Westmoreland	R	GA-03	January 3, 2005	2nd term	
377	Doris Matsui	D	CA-05	March 8, 2005	2nd term	
378	Jean Schmidt	R	OH-02	August 3, 2005	2nd term	
379	John Campbell	R	CA-48	December 7, 2005	2nd term	
380	Brian Bilbray	R	CA-50	June 13, 2006; Previous service, 1995–2001.	5th term*	
381	Albio Sires	D	NJ-13	November 13, 2006	2nd term	
382	Jason Altmire	D	PA-04	January 3, 2007	1st term	
383	Mike Arcuri	D	NY-24	January 3, 2007	1st term	
384	Michele Bachmann	R	MN-06	January 3, 2007	1st term	
385	Gus Bilirakis	R	FL-09	January 3, 2007	1st term	
386	Nancy Boyda	D	KS-02	January 3, 2007	1st term	Left the House in 2009
387	Bruce Braley	D	IA-01	January 3, 2007	1st term	
388	Vern Buchanan	R	FL-13	January 3, 2007	1st term	
389	Chris Carney	D	PA-10	January 3, 2007	1st term	
390	Kathy Castor	D	FL-11	January 3, 2007	1st term	
391	Yvette Clarke	D	NY-11	January 3, 2007	1st term	
392	Steve Cohen	D	TN-09	January 3, 2007	1st term	
393	Joe Courtney	D	CT-02	January 3, 2007	1st term	
394	David Davis	R	TN-01	January 3, 2007	1st term	Left the House in 2009
395	Joe Donnelly	D	IN-02	January 3, 2007	1st term	
396	Keith Ellison	D	MN-05	January 3, 2007	1st term	
397	Brad Ellsworth	D	IN-08	January 3, 2007	1st term	
398	Mary Fallin	R	OK-05	January 3, 2007	1st term	
399	Gabby Giffords	D	AZ-08	January 3, 2007	1st term	
400	Kirsten Gillibrand	D	NY-20	January 3, 2007	1st term	
401	John Hall	D	NY-19	January 3, 2007	1st term	
402	Phil Hare	D	IL-17	January 3, 2007	1st term	
403	Dean Heller	R	NV-02	January 3, 2007	1st term	
404	Baron Hill	D	IN-09	January 3, 2007; Previous service, 1999–2005.	4th term*	
405	Mazie Hirono	D	HI-02	January 3, 2007	1st term	
406	Paul Hodes	D	NH-02	January 3, 2007	1st term	
407	Hank Johnson	D	GA-04	January 3, 2007	1st term	
408	Jim Jordan	R	OH-04	January 3, 2007	1st term	
409	Steve Kagen	D	WI-08	January 3, 2007	1st term	
410	Ron Klein	D	FL-22	January 3, 2007	1st term	
411	Doug Lamborn	R	CO-05	January 3, 2007	1st term	
412	Nick Lampson	D	TX-22	January 3, 2007; Previous service, 1997–2005.	5th term*	Left the House in 2009
413	Dave Loebsack	D	IA-02	January 3, 2007	1st term	
414	Tim Mahoney	D	FL-16	January 3, 2007	1st term	Left the House in 2009
415	Kevin McCarthy	R	CA-22	January 3, 2007	1st term	
416	Jerry McNerney	D	CA-11	January 3, 2007	1st term	
417	Harry Mitchell	D	AZ-05	January 3, 2007	1st term	
418	Chris Murphy	D	CT-05	January 3, 2007	1st term	
419	Patrick Murphy	D	PA-08	January 3, 2007	1st term	
420	Ed Perlmutter	D	CO-07	January 3, 2007	1st term	
421	Ciro Rodriguez	D	TX-23	January 3, 2007; Previous service, 1997–2005.	5th term*	
422	Peter Roskam	R	IL-06	January 3, 2007	1st term	
423	Bill Sali	R	ID-01	January 3, 2007	1st term	Left the House in 2009
424	John Sarbanes	D	MD-03	January 3, 2007	1st term	
425	Joe Sestak	D	PA-07	January 3, 2007	1st term	
426	Heath Shuler	D	NC-11	January 3, 2007	1st term	
427	Carol Shea-Porter	D	NH-01	January 3, 2007	1st term	
428	Adrian Smith	R	NE-03	January 3, 2007	1st term	
429	Zack Space	D	OH-18	January 3, 2007	1st term	
430	Betty Sutton	D	OH-13	January 3, 2007	1st term	
431	Tim Walberg	R	MI-07	January 3, 2007	1st term	Left the House in 2009
432	Tim Walz	D	MN-01	January 3, 2007	1st term	
433	Peter Welch	D	VT-AL	January 3, 2007	1st term	
434	Charlie Wilson	D	OH-06	January 3, 2007	1st term	
435	John Yarmuth	D	KY-03	January 3, 2007	1st term	
	Paul Broun	R	GA-10	July 17, 2007	1st term	
	Laura Richardson	D	CA-37	August 21, 2007	1st term	
	Niki Tsongas	D	MA-05	October 16, 2007	1st term	
	Bob Latta	R	OH-05	December 11, 2007	1st term	
	Rob Wittman	R	VA-01	December 11, 2007	1st term	
	Bill Foster	D	IL-14	March 8, 2008	1st term	
	André Carson	D	IN-07	March 11, 2008	1st term	
	Jackie Speier	D	CA-12	April 8, 2008	1st term	
	Don Cazayoux	D	LA-06	May 3, 2008	1st term	Left the House in 2009
	Steve Scalise	R	LA-01	May 3, 2008	1st term	
	Travis Childers	D	MS-01	May 13, 2008	1st term	
	Donna Edwards	D	MD-04	June 17, 2008	1st term	
	Marcia Fudge	D	OH-11	November 18, 2008	1st term	

== Delegates ==
Rank	Delegate	Party	District	Seniority date! (Previous service, if any)	Term #	Notes
1	Eni Faleomavaega	D	AS	January 3, 1989	10th term	
2	Eleanor Holmes Norton	D	DC	January 3, 1991	9th term	
3	Donna Christian-Christensen	D	VI	January 3, 1997	7th term	
4	Madeleine Bordallo	D	GU	January 3, 2003	3rd term	
5	Luis Fortuño	R	PR	January 3, 2005	2nd term	

== See also ==
- 110th United States Congress
- List of United States congressional districts
- List of United States senators in the 110th Congress
