= List of United States representatives in the 109th Congress =

This is a complete list of United States representatives during the 109th United States Congress listed by seniority.

As an historical article, the districts and party affiliations listed reflect those during the 109th Congress (January 3, 2005 – January 3, 2007). Seats and party affiliations on similar lists for other congresses will be different for certain members.

Seniority depends on the date on which members were sworn into office. Since many members are sworn in on the same day, subsequent ranking is based on previous congressional service of the individual and then by alphabetical order by the last name of the representative.

Committee chairmanship in the House is often associated with seniority. However, party leadership is typically not associated with seniority.

Note: The "*" indicates that the representative/delegate may have served one or more non-consecutive terms while in the House of Representatives of the United States Congress.

== U.S. House seniority list ==
U.S. House seniority
Rank	Representative	Party	District	Seniority date (Previous service, if any)	Term #	Notes
1	John Dingell	D	MI-15	December 13, 1955	26th term	Dean of the House
2	John Conyers	D	MI-14	January 3, 1965	21st term	
3	Dave Obey	D	WI-07	April 1, 1969	19th term	
4	Charles Rangel	D	NY-15	January 3, 1971	18th term	
5	Bill Young	R	FL-10	January 3, 1971	18th term	
6	Ralph Regula	R	OH-16	January 3, 1973	17th term	
7	Pete Stark	D	CA-13	January 3, 1973	17th term	
8	Don Young	R	AK-AL	March 6, 1973	17th term	
9	John Murtha	D	PA-12	February 5, 1974	17th term	
10	Henry Hyde	R	IL-06	January 3, 1975	16th term	Left the House in 2007
11	George Miller	D	CA-07	January 3, 1975	16th term	
12	Jim Oberstar	D	MN-08	January 3, 1975	16th term	
13	Henry Waxman	D	CA-30	January 3, 1975	16th term	
14	Ed Markey	D	MA-07	November 2, 1976	16th term	
15	Norm Dicks	D	WA-06	January 3, 1977	15th term	
16	Dale Kildee	D	MI-05	January 3, 1977	15th term	
17	Jim Leach	R	IA-02	January 3, 1977	15th term	Left the House in 2007
18	Nick Rahall	D	WV-03	January 3, 1977	15th term	
19	Ike Skelton	D	MO-04	January 3, 1977	15th term	
20	Jerry Lewis	R	CA-41	January 3, 1979	14th term	
21	Martin Olav Sabo	D	MN-05	January 3, 1979	14th term	Left the House in 2007
22	Jim Sensenbrenner	R	WI-05	January 3, 1979	14th term	
23	Bill Thomas	R	CA-22	January 3, 1979	14th term	Left the House in 2007
24	Tom Petri	R	WI-06	April 3, 1979	14th term	
25	David Dreier	R	CA-26	January 3, 1981	13th term	
26	Barney Frank	D	MA-04	January 3, 1981	13th term	
27	Ralph Hall	R	TX-04	January 3, 1981	13th term	
28	Duncan L. Hunter	R	CA-52	January 3, 1981	13th term	
29	Tom Lantos	D	CA-12	January 3, 1981	13th term	
30	Hal Rogers	R	KY-05	January 3, 1981	13th term	
31	Clay Shaw	R	FL-22	January 3, 1981	13th term	Left the House in 2007
32	Chris Smith	R	NJ-04	January 3, 1981	13th term	
33	Frank Wolf	R	VA-10	January 3, 1981	13th term	
34	Steny Hoyer	D	MD-05	May 19, 1981	13th term	
35	Mike Oxley	R	OH-04	June 25, 1981	13th term	Left the House in 2007
36	Howard Berman	D	CA-28	January 3, 1983	12th term	
37	Michael Bilirakis	R	FL-09	January 3, 1983	12th term	Left the House in 2007
38	Sherwood Boehlert	R	NY-24	January 3, 1983	12th term	Left the House in 2007
39	Rick Boucher	D	VA-09	January 3, 1983	12th term	
40	Dan Burton	R	IN-05	January 3, 1983	12th term	
41	Lane Evans	D	IL-17	January 3, 1983	12th term	Left the House in 2007
42	Nancy Johnson	R	CT-05	January 3, 1983	12th term	Left the House in 2007
43	Marcy Kaptur	D	OH-09	January 3, 1983	12th term	
44	Sander Levin	D	MI-12	January 3, 1983	12th term	
45	Alan Mollohan	D	WV-01	January 3, 1983	12th term	
46	Solomon P. Ortiz	D	TX-27	January 3, 1983	12th term	
47	Major Owens	D	NY-11	January 3, 1983	12th term	Left the House in 2007
48	John Spratt	D	SC-05	January 3, 1983	12th term	
49	Edolphus Towns	D	NY-10	January 3, 1983	12th term	
50	Gary Ackerman	D	NY-05	March 1, 1983	12th term	
51	Jim Saxton	R	NJ-03	November 6, 1984	12th term	
52	Joe Barton	R	TX-06	January 3, 1985	11th term	
53	Howard Coble	R	NC-06	January 3, 1985	11th term	
54	Tom DeLay	R	TX-22	January 3, 1985	11th term	Resigned on June 9, 2006
55	Bart Gordon	D	TN-06	January 3, 1985	11th term	
56	Paul Kanjorski	D	PA-11	January 3, 1985	11th term	
57	Jim Kolbe	R	AZ-08	January 3, 1985	11th term	Left the House in 2007
58	Pete Visclosky	D	IN-01	January 3, 1985	11th term	
59	Richard Baker	R	LA-06	January 3, 1987	10th term	
60	Ben Cardin	D	MD-03	January 3, 1987	10th term	Left the House in 2007
61	Peter DeFazio	D	OR-04	January 3, 1987	10th term	
62	Elton Gallegly	R	CA-24	January 3, 1987	10th term	
63	Dennis Hastert	R	IL-14	January 3, 1987	10th term	Speaker of the House
64	Joel Hefley	R	CO-05	January 3, 1987	10th term	Left the House in 2007
65	Wally Herger	R	CA-02	January 3, 1987	10th term	
66	John Lewis	D	GA-05	January 3, 1987	10th term	
67	Louise Slaughter	D	NY-28	January 3, 1987	10th term	
68	Lamar Smith	R	TX-21	January 3, 1987	10th term	
69	Fred Upton	R	MI-06	January 3, 1987	10th term	
70	Curt Weldon	R	PA-07	January 3, 1987	10th term	Left the House in 2007
71	Nancy Pelosi	D	CA-08	June 2, 1987	10th term	
72	Chris Shays	R	CT-04	August 18, 1987	10th term	
73	Jim McCrery	R	LA-04	April 16, 1988	10th term	
74	Jerry Costello	D	IL-12	August 9, 1988	10th term	
75	Jimmy Duncan	R	TN-02	November 8, 1988	10th term	
76	Frank Pallone	D	NJ-06	November 8, 1988	10th term	
77	Christopher Cox	R	CA-48	January 3, 1989	9th term	Resigned on August 2, 2005
78	Eliot Engel	D	NY-17	January 3, 1989	9th term	
79	Paul Gillmor	R	OH-05	January 3, 1989	9th term	
80	Nita Lowey	D	NY-18	January 3, 1989	9th term	
81	Jim McDermott	D	WA-07	January 3, 1989	9th term	
82	Michael R. McNulty	D	NY-21	January 3, 1989	9th term	
83	Richard Neal	D	MA-02	January 3, 1989	9th term	
84	Donald M. Payne	D	NJ-10	January 3, 1989	9th term	
85	Dana Rohrabacher	R	CA-46	January 3, 1989	9th term	
86	Cliff Stearns	R	FL-06	January 3, 1989	9th term	
87	John S. Tanner	D	TN-08	January 3, 1989	9th term	
88	James T. Walsh	R	NY-25	January 3, 1989	9th term	
89	Ileana Ros-Lehtinen	R	FL-18	August 29, 1989	9th term	
90	Gene Taylor	D	MS-04	October 17, 1989	9th term	
91	José E. Serrano	D	NY-16	March 20, 1990	9th term	
92	Rob Andrews	D	NJ-01	November 6, 1990	9th term	
93	Neil Abercrombie	D	HI-01	January 3, 1991; Previous service, 1986–1987.	9th term*	
94	John Boehner	R	OH-08	January 3, 1991	8th term	
95	Dave Camp	R	MI-04	January 3, 1991	8th term	
96	Bud Cramer	D	AL-05	January 3, 1991	8th term	
97	Duke Cunningham	R	CA-50	January 3, 1991	8th term	Resigned on December 1, 2005
98	Rosa DeLauro	D	CT-03	January 3, 1991	8th term	
99	John Doolittle	R	CA-04	January 3, 1991	8th term	
100	Chet Edwards	D	TX-17	January 3, 1991	8th term	
101	Wayne Gilchrest	R	MD-01	January 3, 1991	8th term	
102	Dave Hobson	R	OH-07	January 3, 1991	8th term	
103	William J. Jefferson	D	LA-02	January 3, 1991	8th term	
104	Jim Moran	D	VA-08	January 3, 1991	8th term	
105	Jim Nussle	R	IA-01	January 3, 1991	8th term	Left the House in 2007
106	Collin Peterson	D	MN-07	January 3, 1991	8th term	
107	Jim Ramstad	R	MN-03	January 3, 1991	8th term	
108	Bernie Sanders	I	VT-AL	January 3, 1991	8th term	Left the House in 2007
109	Charles H. Taylor	R	NC-11	January 3, 1991	8th term	Left the House in 2007
110	Maxine Waters	D	CA-35	January 3, 1991	8th term	
111	Sam Johnson	R	TX-03	May 8, 1991	8th term	
112	John Olver	D	MA-01	June 18, 1991	8th term	
113	Ed Pastor	D	AZ-04	October 3, 1991	8th term	
114	Jerry Nadler	D	NY-08	November 3, 1992	8th term	
115	Spencer Bachus	R	AL-06	January 3, 1993	7th term	
116	Roscoe Bartlett	R	MD-06	January 3, 1993	7th term	
117	Xavier Becerra	D	CA-31	January 3, 1993	7th term	
118	Sanford Bishop	D	GA-02	January 3, 1993	7th term	
119	Henry Bonilla	R	TX-23	January 3, 1993	7th term	Left the House in 2007
120	Corrine Brown	D	FL-03	January 3, 1993	7th term	
121	Sherrod Brown	D	OH-13	January 3, 1993	7th term	Left the House in 2007
122	Steve Buyer	R	IN-04	January 3, 1993	7th term	
123	Ken Calvert	R	CA-44	January 3, 1993	7th term	
124	Mike Castle	R	DE-AL	January 3, 1993	7th term	
125	Jim Clyburn	D	SC-06	January 3, 1993	7th term	
126	Nathan Deal	R	GA-10	January 3, 1993	7th term	
127	Lincoln Díaz-Balart	R	FL-21	January 3, 1993	7th term	
128	Anna Eshoo	D	CA-14	January 3, 1993	7th term	
129	Terry Everett	R	AL-02	January 3, 1993	7th term	
130	Bob Filner	D	CA-51	January 3, 1993	7th term	
131	Bob Goodlatte	R	VA-06	January 3, 1993	7th term	
132	Gene Green	D	TX-29	January 3, 1993	7th term	
133	Luis Gutiérrez	D	IL-04	January 3, 1993	7th term	
134	Alcee Hastings	D	FL-23	January 3, 1993	7th term	
135	Maurice Hinchey	D	NY-22	January 3, 1993	7th term	
136	Pete Hoekstra	R	MI-02	January 3, 1993	7th term	
137	Tim Holden	D	PA-17	January 3, 1993	7th term	
138	Ernest Istook	R	OK-05	January 3, 1993	7th term	Left the House in 2007
139	Eddie Bernice Johnson	D	TX-30	January 3, 1993	7th term	
140	Peter T. King	R	NY-03	January 3, 1993	7th term	
141	Jack Kingston	R	GA-01	January 3, 1993	7th term	
142	Joe Knollenberg	R	MI-09	January 3, 1993	7th term	
143	John Linder	R	GA-07	January 3, 1993	7th term	
144	Carolyn Maloney	D	NY-14	January 3, 1993	7th term	
145	Don Manzullo	R	IL-16	January 3, 1993	7th term	
146	John M. McHugh	R	NY-23	January 3, 1993	7th term	
147	Buck McKeon	R	CA-25	January 3, 1993	7th term	
148	Marty Meehan	D	MA-05	January 3, 1993	7th term	
149	Bob Menendez	D	NJ-13	January 3, 1993	7th term	Resigned on January 17, 2006
150	John Mica	R	FL-07	January 3, 1993	7th term	
151	Richard Pombo	R	CA-11	January 3, 1993	7th term	Left the House in 2007
152	Earl Pomeroy	D	ND-AL	January 3, 1993	7th term	
153	Deborah Pryce	R	OH-15	January 3, 1993	7th term	
154	Lucille Roybal-Allard	D	CA-34	January 3, 1993	7th term	
155	Ed Royce	R	CA-40	January 3, 1993	7th term	
156	Bobby Rush	D	IL-01	January 3, 1993	7th term	
157	Bobby Scott	D	VA-03	January 3, 1993	7th term	
158	Bart Stupak	D	MI-01	January 3, 1993	7th term	
159	Nydia Velázquez	D	NY-12	January 3, 1993	7th term	
160	Mel Watt	D	NC-12	January 3, 1993	7th term	
161	Lynn Woolsey	D	CA-06	January 3, 1993	7th term	
162	Albert Wynn	D	MD-04	January 3, 1993	7th term	
163	Bennie Thompson	D	MS-02	April 13, 1993	7th term	
164	Rob Portman	R	OH-02	May 4, 1993	7th term	Resigned on May 17, 2005
165	Sam Farr	D	CA-17	June 8, 1993	7th term	
166	Vern Ehlers	R	MI-03	December 7, 1993	7th term	
167	Frank Lucas	R	OK-03	May 10, 1994	7th term	
168	Ron Lewis	R	KY-02	May 24, 1994	7th term	
169	Charles Bass	R	NH-02	January 3, 1995	6th term	Left the House in 2007
170	Steve Chabot	R	OH-01	January 3, 1995	6th term	
171	Barbara Cubin	R	WY-AL	January 3, 1995	6th term	
172	Tom Davis	R	VA-11	January 3, 1995	6th term	
173	Lloyd Doggett	D	TX-25	January 3, 1995	6th term	
174	Mike Doyle	D	PA-14	January 3, 1995	6th term	
175	Phil English	R	PA-03	January 3, 1995	6th term	
176	Chaka Fattah	D	PA-02	January 3, 1995	6th term	
177	Mark Foley	R	FL-16	January 3, 1995	6th term	Resigned on September 29, 2006
178	Rodney Frelinghuysen	R	NJ-11	January 3, 1995	6th term	
179	Gil Gutknecht	R	MN-01	January 3, 1995	6th term	Left the House in 2007
180	Doc Hastings	R	WA-04	January 3, 1995	6th term	
181	J. D. Hayworth	R	AZ-05	January 3, 1995	6th term	Left the House in 2007
182	John Hostettler	R	IN-08	January 3, 1995	6th term	Left the House in 2007
183	Sheila Jackson Lee	D	TX-18	January 3, 1995	6th term	
184	Walter B. Jones Jr.	R	NC-03	January 3, 1995	6th term	
185	Sue W. Kelly	R	NY-19	January 3, 1995	6th term	Left the House in 2007
186	Patrick J. Kennedy	D	RI-01	January 3, 1995	6th term	
187	Ray LaHood	R	IL-18	January 3, 1995	6th term	
188	Tom Latham	R	IA-04	January 3, 1995	6th term	
189	Steve LaTourette	R	OH-14	January 3, 1995	6th term	
190	Frank LoBiondo	R	NJ-02	January 3, 1995	6th term	
191	Zoe Lofgren	D	CA-16	January 3, 1995	6th term	
192	Sue Myrick	R	NC-09	January 3, 1995	6th term	
193	Bob Ney	R	OH-18	January 3, 1995	6th term	Resigned on November 3, 2006
194	Charlie Norwood	R	GA-09	January 3, 1995	6th term	
195	George Radanovich	R	CA-19	January 3, 1995	6th term	
196	John Shadegg	R	AZ-03	January 3, 1995	6th term	
197	Mark Souder	R	IN-03	January 3, 1995	6th term	
198	Mac Thornberry	R	TX-13	January 3, 1995	6th term	
199	Todd Tiahrt	R	KS-04	January 3, 1995	6th term	
200	Zach Wamp	R	TN-03	January 3, 1995	6th term	
201	Dave Weldon	R	FL-15	January 3, 1995	6th term	
202	Jerry Weller	R	IL-11	January 3, 1995	6th term	
203	Ed Whitfield	R	KY-01	January 3, 1995	6th term	
204	Roger Wicker	R	MS-01	January 3, 1995	6th term	
205	Jesse Jackson Jr.	D	IL-02	December 12, 1995	6th term	
206	Juanita Millender-McDonald	D	CA-37	March 26, 1996	6th term	
207	Elijah Cummings	D	MD-07	April 16, 1996	6th term	
208	Earl Blumenauer	D	OR-03	May 21, 1996	6th term	
209	Jo Ann Emerson	R	MO-08	November 5, 1996	6th term	
210	Jim Ryun	R	KS-02	November 27, 1996	6th term	Left the House in 2007
211	Robert Aderholt	R	AL-04	January 3, 1997	5th term	
212	Tom Allen	D	ME-01	January 3, 1997	5th term	
213	Marion Berry	D	AR-01	January 3, 1997	5th term	
214	Roy Blunt	R	MO-07	January 3, 1997	5th term	
215	Leonard Boswell	D	IA-03	January 3, 1997	5th term	
216	Allen Boyd	D	FL-02	January 3, 1997	5th term	
217	Kevin Brady	R	TX-08	January 3, 1997	5th term	
218	Chris Cannon	R	UT-03	January 3, 1997	5th term	
219	Julia Carson	D	IN-07	January 3, 1997	5th term	
220	Danny K. Davis	D	IL-07	January 3, 1997	5th term	
221	Jim Davis	D	FL-11	January 3, 1997	5th term	Left the House in 2007
222	Diana DeGette	D	CO-01	January 3, 1997	5th term	
223	Bill Delahunt	D	MA-10	January 3, 1997	5th term	
224	Bob Etheridge	D	NC-02	January 3, 1997	5th term	
225	Harold Ford Jr.	D	TN-09	January 3, 1997	5th term	Left the House in 2007
226	Jim Gibbons	R	NV-02	January 3, 1997	5th term	Left the House in 2007
227	Virgil Goode	R	VA-05	January 3, 1997	5th term	
228	Kay Granger	R	TX-12	January 3, 1997	5th term	
229	Rubén Hinojosa	D	TX-15	January 3, 1997	5th term	
230	Darlene Hooley	D	OR-05	January 3, 1997	5th term	
231	Kenny Hulshof	R	MO-09	January 3, 1997	5th term	
232	Bill Jenkins	R	TN-01	January 3, 1997	5th term	Left the House in 2007
233	Carolyn Cheeks Kilpatrick	D	MI-13	January 3, 1997	5th term	
234	Ron Kind	D	WI-03	January 3, 1997	5th term	
235	Dennis Kucinich	D	OH-10	January 3, 1997	5th term	
236	Carolyn McCarthy	D	NY-04	January 3, 1997	5th term	
237	Jim McGovern	D	MA-03	January 3, 1997	5th term	
238	Mike McIntyre	D	NC-07	January 3, 1997	5th term	
239	Jerry Moran	R	KS-01	January 3, 1997	5th term	
240	Anne Northup	R	KY-03	January 3, 1997	5th term	Left the House in 2007
241	Bill Pascrell	D	NJ-08	January 3, 1997	5th term	
242	Ron Paul	R	TX-14	January 3, 1997; Previous service, 1976–1977 and 1979–1985.	9th term**	
243	John E. Peterson	R	PA-05	January 3, 1997	5th term	
244	Chip Pickering	R	MS-03	January 3, 1997	5th term	
245	Joe Pitts	R	PA-16	January 3, 1997	5th term	
246	David Price	D	NC-04	January 3, 1997; Previous service, 1987–1995.	9th term*	
247	Silvestre Reyes	D	TX-16	January 3, 1997	5th term	
248	Steve Rothman	D	NJ-09	January 3, 1997	5th term	
249	Loretta Sanchez	D	CA-47	January 3, 1997	5th term	
250	Pete Sessions	R	TX-32	January 3, 1997	5th term	
251	Brad Sherman	D	CA-27	January 3, 1997	5th term	
252	John Shimkus	R	IL-19	January 3, 1997	5th term	
253	Adam Smith	D	WA-09	January 3, 1997	5th term	
254	Vic Snyder	D	AR-02	January 3, 1997	5th term	
255	Ted Strickland	D	OH-06	January 3, 1997; Previous service, 1993–1995.	6th term*	Left the House in 2007
256	Ellen Tauscher	D	CA-10	January 3, 1997	5th term	
257	John F. Tierney	D	MA-06	January 3, 1997	5th term	
258	Robert Wexler	D	FL-19	January 3, 1997	5th term	
259	Vito Fossella	R	NY-13	November 4, 1997	5th term	
260	Gregory Meeks	D	NY-06	February 3, 1998	5th term	
261	Lois Capps	D	CA-23	March 10, 1998	5th term	
262	Mary Bono	R	CA-45	April 7, 1998	5th term	
263	Barbara Lee	D	CA-09	April 7, 1998	5th term	
264	Bob Brady	D	PA-01	May 19, 1998	5th term	
265	Heather Wilson	R	NM-01	June 25, 1998	5th term	
266	Brian Baird	D	WA-03	January 3, 1999	4th term	
267	Tammy Baldwin	D	WI-02	January 3, 1999	4th term	
268	Shelley Berkley	D	NV-01	January 3, 1999	4th term	
269	Judy Biggert	R	IL-13	January 3, 1999	4th term	
270	Mike Capuano	D	MA-08	January 3, 1999	4th term	
271	Joe Crowley	D	NY-07	January 3, 1999	4th term	
272	Charlie Gonzalez	D	TX-20	January 3, 1999	4th term	
273	Mark Green	R	WI-08	January 3, 1999	4th term	Left the House in 2007
274	Robin Hayes	R	NC-08	January 3, 1999	4th term	
275	Rush Holt Jr.	D	NJ-12	January 3, 1999	4th term	
276	Jay Inslee	D	WA-01	January 3, 1999; Previous service, 1993–1995.	5th term*	
277	Stephanie Tubbs Jones	D	OH-11	January 3, 1999	4th term	
278	John B. Larson	D	CT-01	January 3, 1999	4th term	
279	Gary Miller	R	CA-42	January 3, 1999	4th term	
280	Dennis Moore	D	KS-03	January 3, 1999	4th term	
281	Grace Napolitano	D	CA-38	January 3, 1999	4th term	
282	Thomas M. Reynolds	R	NY-26	January 3, 1999	4th term	
283	Paul Ryan	R	WI-01	January 3, 1999	4th term	
284	Jan Schakowsky	D	IL-09	January 3, 1999	4th term	
285	Don Sherwood	R	PA-10	January 3, 1999	4th term	Left the House in 2007
286	Mike Simpson	R	ID-02	January 3, 1999	4th term	
287	John E. Sweeney	R	NY-20	January 3, 1999	4th term	Left the House in 2007
288	Tom Tancredo	R	CO-06	January 3, 1999	4th term	
289	Lee Terry	R	NE-02	January 3, 1999	4th term	
290	Mike Thompson	D	CA-01	January 3, 1999	4th term	
291	Mark Udall	D	CO-02	January 3, 1999	4th term	
292	Tom Udall	D	NM-03	January 3, 1999	4th term	
293	Greg Walden	R	OR-02	January 3, 1999	4th term	
294	Anthony Weiner	D	NY-09	January 3, 1999	4th term	
295	David Wu	D	OR-01	January 3, 1999	4th term	
296	Joe Baca	D	CA-43	November 16, 1999	4th term	
297	Todd Akin	R	MO-02	January 3, 2001	3rd term	
298	Henry E. Brown Jr.	R	SC-01	January 3, 2001	3rd term	
299	Eric Cantor	R	VA-07	January 3, 2001	3rd term	
300	Shelley Moore Capito	R	WV-02	January 3, 2001	3rd term	
301	Lacy Clay	D	MO-01	January 3, 2001	3rd term	
302	Ander Crenshaw	R	FL-04	January 3, 2001	3rd term	
303	John Culberson	R	TX-07	January 3, 2001	3rd term	
304	Jo Ann Davis	R	VA-01	January 3, 2001	3rd term	
305	Susan Davis	D	CA-53	January 3, 2001	3rd term	
306	Mike Ferguson	R	NJ-07	January 3, 2001	3rd term	
307	Jeff Flake	R	AZ-06	January 3, 2001	3rd term	
308	Sam Graves	R	MO-06	January 3, 2001	3rd term	
309	Jane Harman	D	CA-36	January 3, 2001; Previous service, 1993–1999.	6th term*	
310	Melissa Hart	R	PA-04	January 3, 2001	3rd term	Left the House in 2007
311	Mike Honda	D	CA-15	January 3, 2001	3rd term	
312	Steve Israel	D	NY-02	January 3, 2001	3rd term	
313	Darrell Issa	R	CA-49	January 3, 2001	3rd term	
314	Tim Johnson	R	IL-15	January 3, 2001	3rd term	
315	Ric Keller	R	FL-08	January 3, 2001	3rd term	
316	Mark Kennedy	R	MN-06	January 3, 2001	3rd term	Left the House in 2007
317	Mark Kirk	R	IL-10	January 3, 2001	3rd term	
318	James Langevin	D	RI-02	January 3, 2001	3rd term	
319	Rick Larsen	D	WA-02	January 3, 2001	3rd term	
320	Jim Matheson	D	UT-02	January 3, 2001	3rd term	
321	Betty McCollum	D	MN-04	January 3, 2001	3rd term	
322	Tom Osborne	R	NE-03	January 3, 2001	3rd term	Left the House in 2007
323	Mike Pence	R	IN-06	January 3, 2001	3rd term	
324	Todd Platts	R	PA-19	January 3, 2001	3rd term	
325	Butch Otter	R	ID-01	January 3, 2001	3rd term	Stepped down on January 1, 2007, to become Governor of Idaho.
326	Adam Putnam	R	FL-12	January 3, 2001	3rd term	
327	Denny Rehberg	R	MT-AL	January 3, 2001	3rd term	
328	Mike Rogers	R	MI-08	January 3, 2001	3rd term	
329	Mike Ross	D	AR-04	January 3, 2001	3rd term	
330	Adam Schiff	D	CA-29	January 3, 2001	3rd term	
331	Rob Simmons	R	CT-02	January 3, 2001	3rd term	Left the House in 2007
332	Hilda Solis	D	CA-32	January 3, 2001	3rd term	
333	Pat Tiberi	R	OH-12	January 3, 2001	3rd term	
334	Bill Shuster	R	PA-09	May 15, 2001	3rd term	
335	Diane Watson	D	CA-33	June 5, 2001	3rd term	
336	Randy Forbes	R	VA-04	June 19, 2001	3rd term	
337	Stephen Lynch	D	MA-09	October 16, 2001	3rd term	
338	Jeff Miller	R	FL-01	October 16, 2001	3rd term	
339	John Boozman	R	AR-03	November 20, 2001	3rd term	
340	Joe Wilson	R	SC-02	December 18, 2001	3rd term	
341	John Sullivan	R	OK-01	February 15, 2002	3rd term	
342	Ed Case	D	HI-02	November 30, 2002	3rd term	Left the House in 2007
343	Rodney Alexander	R	LA-05	January 3, 2003	2nd term	
344	Gresham Barrett	R	SC-03	January 3, 2003	2nd term	
345	Bob Beauprez	R	CO-07	January 3, 2003	2nd term	Left the House in 2007
346	Rob Bishop	R	UT-01	January 3, 2003	2nd term	
347	Tim Bishop	D	NY-01	January 3, 2003	2nd term	
348	Marsha Blackburn	R	TN-07	January 3, 2003	2nd term	
349	Jo Bonner	R	AL-01	January 3, 2003	2nd term	
350	Ginny Brown-Waite	R	FL-05	January 3, 2003	2nd term	
351	Jeb Bradley	R	NH-01	January 3, 2003	2nd term	Left the House in 2007
352	Michael C. Burgess	R	TX-26	January 3, 2003	2nd term	
353	Dennis Cardoza	D	CA-18	January 3, 2003	2nd term	
354	John Carter	R	TX-31	January 3, 2003	2nd term	
355	Chris Chocola	R	IN-02	January 3, 2003	2nd term	Left the House in 2007
356	Tom Cole	R	OK-04	January 3, 2003	2nd term	
357	Jim Cooper	D	TN-05	January 3, 2003; Previous service, 1983–1995.	8th term*	
358	Artur Davis	D	AL-07	January 3, 2003	2nd term	
359	Lincoln Davis	D	TN-04	January 3, 2003	2nd term	
360	Mario Díaz-Balart	R	FL-25	January 3, 2003	2nd term	
361	Rahm Emanuel	D	IL-05	January 3, 2003	2nd term	
362	Tom Feeney	R	FL-24	January 3, 2003	2nd term	
363	Trent Franks	R	AZ-02	January 3, 2003	2nd term	
364	Scott Garrett	R	NJ-05	January 3, 2003	2nd term	
365	Jim Gerlach	R	PA-06	January 3, 2003	2nd term	
366	Phil Gingrey	R	GA-11	January 3, 2003	2nd term	
367	Raúl Grijalva	D	AZ-07	January 3, 2003	2nd term	
368	Katherine Harris	R	FL-13	January 3, 2003	2nd term	Left the House in 2007
369	Jeb Hensarling	R	TX-05	January 3, 2003	2nd term	
370	Steve King	R	IA-05	January 3, 2003	2nd term	
371	John Kline	R	MN-02	January 3, 2003	2nd term	
372	Jim Marshall	D	GA-03	January 3, 2003	2nd term	
373	Thaddeus McCotter	R	MI-11	January 3, 2003	2nd term	
374	Kendrick Meek	D	FL-17	January 3, 2003	2nd term	
375	Mike Michaud	D	ME-02	January 3, 2003	2nd term	
376	Brad Miller	D	NC-13	January 3, 2003	2nd term	
377	Candice Miller	R	MI-10	January 3, 2003	2nd term	
378	Tim Murphy	R	PA-18	January 3, 2003	2nd term	
379	Marilyn Musgrave	R	CO-04	January 3, 2003	2nd term	
380	Devin Nunes	R	CA-21	January 3, 2003	2nd term	
381	Steve Pearce	R	NM-02	January 3, 2003	2nd term	
382	Jon Porter	R	NV-03	January 3, 2003	2nd term	
383	Rick Renzi	R	AZ-01	January 3, 2003	2nd term	
384	Mike Rogers	R	AL-03	January 3, 2003	2nd term	
385	Dutch Ruppersberger	D	MD-02	January 3, 2003	2nd term	
386	Tim Ryan	D	OH-17	January 3, 2003	2nd term	
387	Linda Sánchez	D	CA-39	January 3, 2003	2nd term	
388	David Scott	D	GA-13	January 3, 2003	2nd term	
389	Mike Turner	R	OH-03	January 3, 2003	2nd term	
390	Chris Van Hollen	D	MD-08	January 3, 2003	2nd term	
391	Randy Neugebauer	R	TX-19	June 3, 2003	2nd term	
392	Ben Chandler	D	KY-06	February 17, 2004	2nd term	
393	Stephanie Herseth	D	SD-AL	June 1, 2004	2nd term	
394	G. K. Butterfield	D	NC-01	July 20, 2004	2nd term	
395	John Barrow	D	GA-12	January 3, 2005	1st term	
396	Melissa Bean	D	IL-08	January 3, 2005	1st term	
397	Dan Boren	D	OK-02	January 3, 2005	1st term	
398	Charles Boustany	R	LA-07	January 3, 2005	1st term	
399	Russ Carnahan	D	MO-03	January 3, 2005	1st term	
400	Emanuel Cleaver	D	MO-05	January 3, 2005	1st term	
401	Mike Conaway	R	TX-11	January 3, 2005	1st term	
402	Jim Costa	D	CA-20	January 3, 2005	1st term	
403	Henry Cuellar	D	TX-28	January 3, 2005	1st term	
404	Geoff Davis	R	KY-04	January 3, 2005	1st term	
405	Charlie Dent	R	PA-15	January 3, 2005	1st term	
406	Thelma Drake	R	VA-02	January 3, 2005	1st term	
407	Mike Fitzpatrick	R	PA-08	January 3, 2005	1st term	Left the House in 2007
408	Jeff Fortenberry	R	NE-01	January 3, 2005	1st term	
409	Virginia Foxx	R	NC-05	January 3, 2005	1st term	
410	Louie Gohmert	R	TX-01	January 3, 2005	1st term	
411	Al Green	D	TX-09	January 3, 2005	1st term	
412	Brian Higgins	D	NY-27	January 3, 2005	1st term	
413	Bob Inglis	R	SC-04	January 3, 2005; Previous service, 1993–1999.	4th term*	
414	Bobby Jindal	R	LA-01	January 3, 2005	1st term	
415	Randy Kuhl	R	NY-29	January 3, 2005	1st term	
416	Dan Lipinski	D	IL-03	January 3, 2005	1st term	
417	Dan Lungren	R	CA-03	January 3, 2005; Previous service, 1979–1989.	6th term*	
418	Connie Mack IV	R	FL-14	January 3, 2005	1st term	
419	Kenny Marchant	R	TX-24	January 3, 2005	1st term	
420	Michael McCaul	R	TX-10	January 3, 2005	1st term	
421	Patrick McHenry	R	NC-10	January 3, 2005	1st term	
422	Cynthia McKinney	D	GA-04	January 3, 2005; Previous service, 1993–2003.	6th term*	Left the House in 2007
423	Cathy McMorris	R	WA-05	January 3, 2005	1st term	
424	Charlie Melançon	D	LA-03	January 3, 2005	1st term	
425	Gwen Moore	D	WI-04	January 3, 2005	1st term	
426	Ted Poe	R	TX-02	January 3, 2005	1st term	
427	Tom Price	R	GA-06	January 3, 2005	1st term	
428	Dave Reichert	R	WA-08	January 3, 2005	1st term	
429	John Salazar	D	CO-03	January 3, 2005	1st term	
430	Allyson Schwartz	D	PA-13	January 3, 2005	1st term	
431	Joe Schwarz	R	MI-07	January 3, 2005	1st term	Left the House in 2007
432	Mike Sodrel	R	IN-09	January 3, 2005	1st term	Left the House in 2007
433	Debbie Wasserman Schultz	D	FL-20	January 3, 2005	1st term	
434	Lynn Westmoreland	R	GA-08	January 3, 2005	1st term	
	Doris Matsui	D	CA-05	March 8, 2005	1st term	
	Jean Schmidt	R	OH-02	August 3, 2005	1st term	
	John Campbell	R	CA-48	December 7, 2005	1st term	
	Brian Bilbray	R	CA-50	June 13, 2006; Previous service, 1995–2001.	5th term*	
	Shelley Sekula-Gibbs	R	TX-22	November 13, 2006	1st term	Left the House in 2007
	Albio Sires	D	NJ-13	November 13, 2006	1st term	

== Delegates ==
Rank	Delegate	Party	District	Seniority date (Previous service, if any)	Term #	Notes
1	Eni Faleomavaega	D	AS	January 3, 1989	9th term	
2	Eleanor Holmes Norton	D	DC	January 3, 1991	8th term	
3	Donna Christian-Christensen	D	VI	January 3, 1997	5th term	
4	Madeleine Bordallo	D	GU	January 3, 2003	2nd term	
5	Luis Fortuño	R	PR	January 3, 2005	1st term	

== See also ==
- 109th United States Congress
- List of United States congressional districts
- List of United States senators in the 109th Congress
