= Bob Matsui =

American politician (1941–2005)

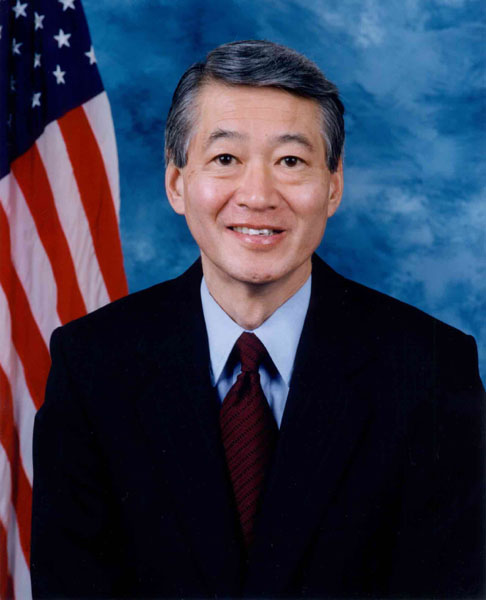

Chair of the Democratic Congressional Campaign Committee
- In office January 3, 2003 – January 1, 2005
- Leader: Nancy Pelosi
- Preceded by: Nita Lowey
- Succeeded by: Rahm Emanuel

Member of the U.S. House of Representatives from California
- In office January 3, 1979 – January 1, 2005
- Preceded by: John E. Moss
- Succeeded by: Doris Matsui
- Constituency: 3rd district (1979–1993); 5th district (1993–2005)

Treasurer of the Democratic National Committee
- In office September 8, 1991 – May 17, 1995
- Preceded by: Robert Farmer
- Succeeded by: Robert Scott Pastrick

Member of the Sacramento City Council from the 8th district
- In office November 1971 – November 8, 1978
- Succeeded by: Patrick Donovan

Personal details
- Born: Robert Takeo Matsui; September 17, 1941 Sacramento, California, U.S.
- Died: January 1, 2005 (aged 63) Bethesda, Maryland, U.S.
- Resting place: East Lawn Memorial Park; East Sacramento, California
- Party: Democratic
- Spouse: Doris Okada (m. 1966)
- Children: 1
- Education: University of California, Berkeley (BA); University of California, Hastings (JD)
- Bob Matsui's voice Bob Matsui speaks in support of the Social Security Protection Act of 2004; Recorded February 11, 2004

Robert Takeo Matsui (September 17, 1941 – January 1, 2005) was an American politician from the state of California. Matsui was a member of the Democratic Party and served in the U.S. House of Representatives as the congressman for California's 5th congressional district from 1979 until his death at the end of his 13th term, where he was succeeded by his wife, Doris Matsui.

The Robert T. Matsui United States Courthouse in Sacramento is named in his honor.

== Early life and education ==
A third-generation Japanese American, Matsui was born in Sacramento, California, and was six months old when he and his family were taken from Sacramento and interned by the U.S. government at the Tule Lake War Relocation Center in 1942.

Matsui graduated from the University of California, Berkeley, in 1963 with a B.A. in political science, and then from the Hastings College of Law in 1966. He founded his own Sacramento law practice in 1967.

== Political career ==
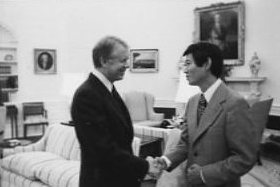
Matsui greeting President Jimmy Carter in 1978

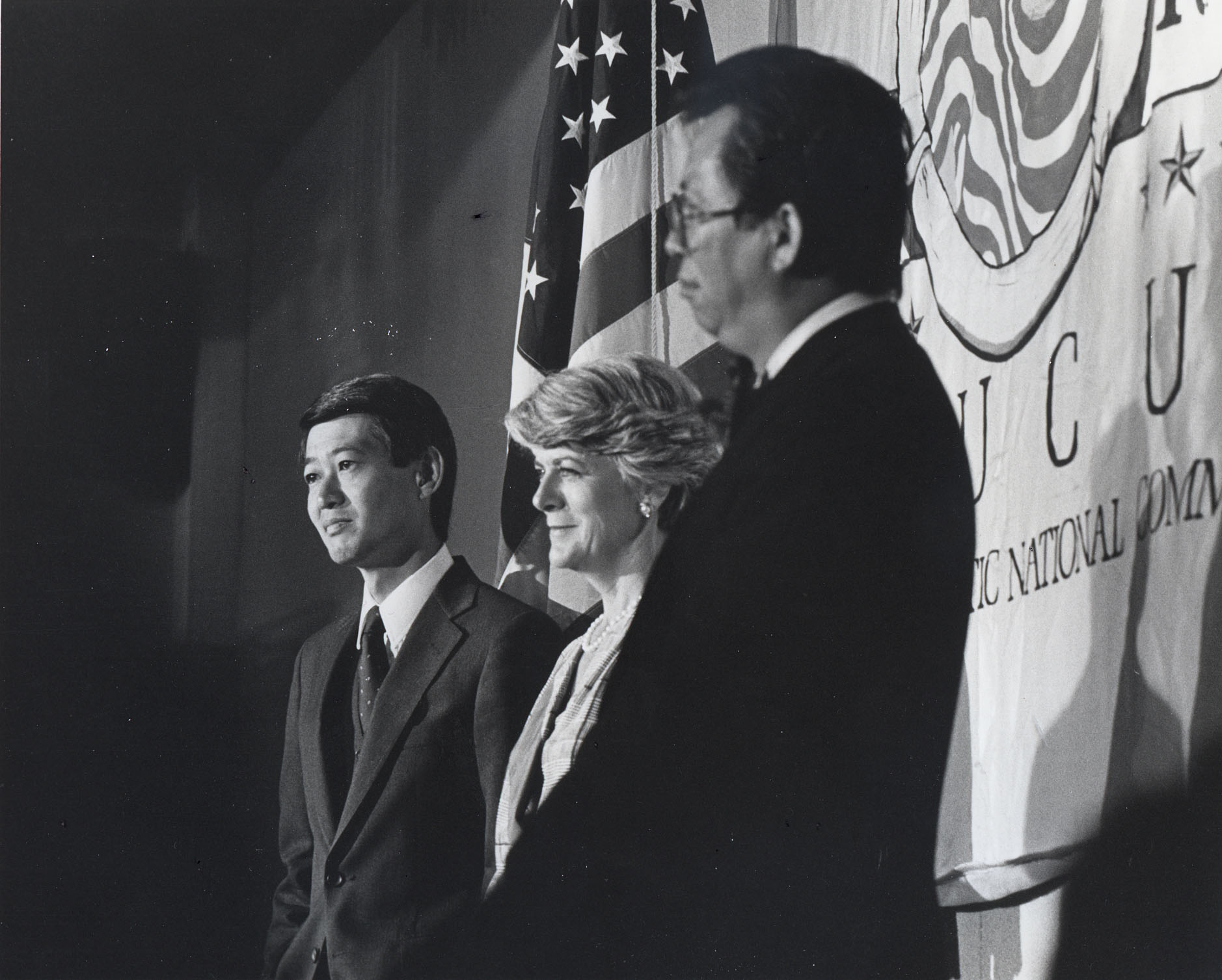
Congressman Bob Matsui with Geraldine Ferraro and Tom Hsieh at the 1984 Democratic National Convention in San Francisco

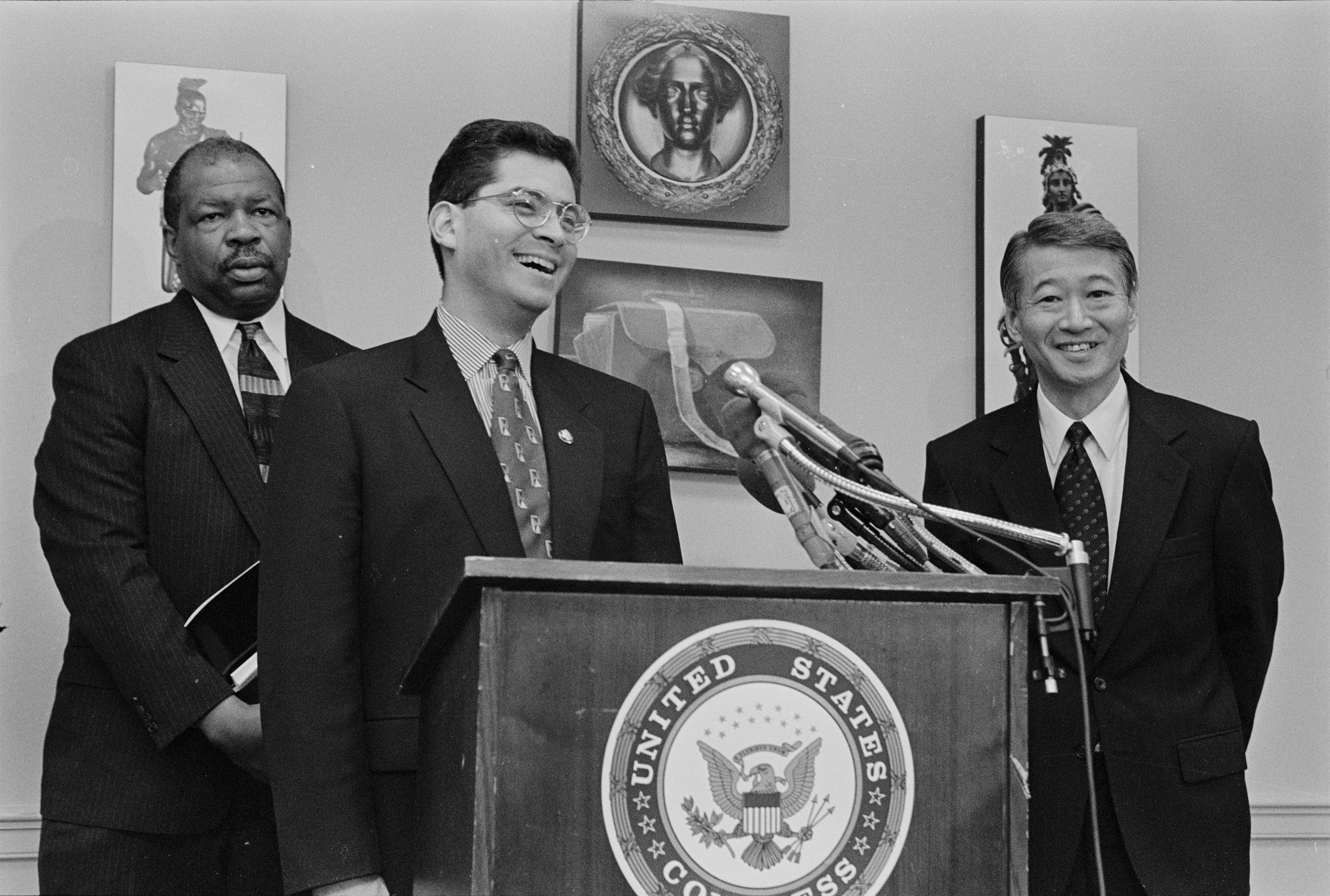
Elijah Cummings, Xavier Becerra, and Robert Matsui at a press conference on civil rights in 1997

In 1971, Matsui was elected to the Sacramento City Council. He won re-election in 1975 and became vice mayor of the city in 1977.

In 1978, Matsui ran for the Democratic nomination in what was then the 3rd district after 12-term incumbent John E. Moss announced his retirement. He won a five-way Democratic primary with 36 percent of the vote, besting a field that included State Assemblyman Eugene Gualco and Sacramento Mayor Phil Isenberg.

He defeated Republican Sandy Smoley with 53 percent of the vote. He would never face another contest nearly that close in what has long been the most Democratic district in interior California, and would be reelected 13 times. After his initial contest, he never dropped below 68 percent of the vote. He was reelected in 1982 with no major-party opposition, and was unopposed in 1984. His district was renumbered as the 5th district after the 1990 census.

In 1988, Matsui succeeded in helping pass the Civil Liberties Act of 1988, which produced an official apology from the Federal government for the World War II internment program and offered token compensation to victims. He was also instrumental in the designation of Manzanar internment camp as a national historic site and in obtaining land in Washington, D.C. for the memorial to Japanese-American patriotism in World War II.

He was a chairman of the Democratic Congressional Campaign Committee, ranking member of the United States House Committee on Ways and Means, and third-ranking Democrat on the Ways and Means Committee. During his term he was noted for his staunch opposition to privatization of Social Security. He had a mostly liberal voting record having opposed the Defense of Marriage Act, the ban on partial-birth abortions, and the Private Securities and Litigations Reform Act.

In what would be his last election, 2004, he faced Republican Mike Dugas and easily won a 14th term with 71.4% of the vote, compared to Dugas' 23.4%. Opponents Pat Driscoll (Green Party) and John Reiger (Peace and Freedom Party), won 3.4% and 1.8% of the vote, respectively. (DCCC chairs are chosen in part because they are not expected to face serious competition for re-election.)

== Personal life ==
He was married to Doris Okada who, until December 1998, worked as deputy assistant to the President and Deputy Director of Public Liaison for President Bill Clinton, leaving to become senior advisor and director of government relations at the firm of Collier Shannon Scott, PLLC before winning election to her late husband's seat. The Matsuis had one son, Brian, who received his undergraduate and Juris Doctor degrees from Stanford University.

== Death ==
On December 24, 2004, Matsui entered Bethesda Naval Hospital with pneumonia. It was a complication from myelodysplastic syndrome, a rare stem cell disorder that causes an inability of the bone marrow to produce blood products, such as red blood cells, white blood cells and platelets. He died of pneumonia on January 1, 2005.

=== Succession ===
In the special election on March 8 to fill the vacant seat, Matsui's widow Doris won with over 68 percent of the vote; she was sworn in on March 10, 2005.

== Electoral history ==
Bob Matsui electoral history

United States House of Representatives elections
Party	Candidate	Votes	%
Democratic	Bob Matsui	105,537	53.4
Republican	Sandy Smoley	91,966	46.6
Total votes		197,503	100.0
Democratic hold			

United States House of Representatives elections
Party	Candidate	Votes	%
Democratic	Robert Matsui (Incumbent)	170,670	70.6
Republican	Joseph Murphy	64,215	26.5
Libertarian	Bruce A. Daniel	6,980	2.9
Total votes		241,865	100.0
Democratic hold			

United States House of Representatives elections
Party	Candidate	Votes	%
Democratic	Robert Matsui (Incumbent)	194,680	89.6
Libertarian	Bruce A. Daniel	16,222	7.5
Peace and Freedom	John Newmeyer	6,294	2.9
Total votes		217,196	100.0
Democratic hold			

United States House of Representatives elections
Party	Candidate	Votes	%
Democratic	Robert Matsui (Incumbent)	131,369	100.0
Democratic hold			

United States House of Representatives elections
Party	Candidate	Votes	%
Democratic	Robert Matsui (Incumbent)	158,709	75.9
Republican	Lowell Patrick Landowski	50,265	24.1
Total votes		208,974	100.0
Democratic hold			

United States House of Representatives elections
Party	Candidate	Votes	%
Democratic	Robert Matsui (Incumbent)	183,470	71.2
Republican	Lowell Patrick Landowski	74,296	28.8
Total votes		257,766	100.0
Democratic hold			

United States House of Representatives elections
Party	Candidate	Votes	%
Democratic	Robert Matsui (Incumbent)	132,143	60.3
Republican	Lowell Patrick Landowski	76,148	34.8
Libertarian	David M. McCann	10,797	4.9
Total votes		219,088	100.0
Democratic hold			

1992 United States House of Representatives elections in California
Party	Candidate	Votes	%
Democratic	Robert Matsui (Incumbent)	158,250	68.6
Republican	Robert S. Dinsmore	58,698	25.5
American Independent	Gordon Mors	4,745	2.1
Libertarian	Chris J. Rufer	4,547	2.0
Green	Tian Harter	4,316	1.9
No party	Bergeron (write-in)	4	0.0
Total votes		230,560	100.0
Turnout			
Democratic hold			

1994 United States House of Representatives elections in California
Party	Candidate	Votes	%
Democratic	Robert Matsui (Incumbent)	125,042	68.48
Republican	Robert S. Dinsmore	52,905	28.97
American Independent	Gordon Mors	4,649	2.55
Total votes		182,596	100.0
Turnout			
Democratic hold			

1996 United States House of Representatives elections in California
Party	Candidate	Votes	%
Democratic	Robert Matsui (Incumbent)	142,618	70.5
Republican	Robert Dinsmore	52,940	26.2
Libertarian	Joseph Miller	2,548	1.2
American Independent	Gordon Mors	2,231	1.1
Natural Law	Charles Kersey	2,123	1.0
Total votes		202,460	100.0
Turnout			
Democratic hold			

1998 United States House of Representatives elections in California
Party	Candidate	Votes	%
Democratic	Robert Matsui (Incumbent)	130,715	71.89
Republican	Robert Dinsmore	47,307	26.02
Libertarian	Douglas Arthur Tuma	3,746	2.06
Green	Ken Adams (write-in)	70	0.04
Total votes		181,838	100.0
Turnout			
Democratic hold			

2000 United States House of Representatives elections in California
Party	Candidate	Votes	%
Democratic	Robert Matsui (Incumbent)	147,025	68.1
Republican	Ken Payne	55,945	25.9
Green	Ken Adams	6,195	2.9
Libertarian	Cullene Lang	3,746	1.7
Natural Law	Alan Barreca	2,894	1.3
Total votes		215,805	100.0
Turnout			
Democratic hold			

2002 United States House of Representatives elections in California
Party	Candidate	Votes	%
Democratic	Robert Matsui (Incumbent)	90,697	70.9
Republican	Richard Frankhuizen	33,313	26.1
Libertarian	Timothy E. Roloff	3,923	3.0
Total votes		189,717	100.0
Turnout			
Democratic hold			

2004 United States House of Representatives elections in California
Party	Candidate	Votes	%
Democratic	Robert Matsui (Incumbent)	138,004	71.4
Republican	Mike Dugas	45,120	23.4
Green	Pat Driscoll	6,593	3.4
Peace and Freedom	John C. Reiger	3,670	1.8
Total votes		193,387	100.0
Turnout			
Democratic hold			

== See also ==
- List of Asian Americans and Pacific Islands Americans in the United States Congress
- List of members of the United States Congress who died in office (2000–present)#2000s

U.S. House of Representatives
Preceded by John E. Moss	Member of the U.S. House of Representatives from California's 3rd congressional district 1979–1993	Succeeded by Vic Fazio
Preceded by Nancy Pelosi	Member of the U.S. House of Representatives from California's 5th congressional district 1993–2005	Succeeded by Doris Matsui
Party political offices
Preceded by Nita Lowey	Chair of the Democratic Congressional Campaign Committee; 2003–2005	Succeeded by Rahm Emanuel
