= List of United States senators in the 110th Congress =

This is a complete list of United States senators during the 110th United States Congress listed by seniority from January 3, 2007, to January 3, 2009. It is meant as a historical listing and thus contains senators who have died or left office (such as Craig Thomas and Trent Lott). For a current listing of senators please go to Seniority in the United States Senate.

In this congress, Jeff Bingaman (D-New Mexico) was the most senior junior senator and Norm Coleman (R-Minnesota) was the most junior senior senator.

Order of service is based on the commencement of the senator's first term. Behind this is former service as a U.S. senator (only giving the senator seniority within their new incoming class), service as U.S. vice president, a House member, a cabinet secretary, a state governor, and then by their state's population, respectively.

Senators who were sworn in in the middle of the two-year congressional term (up until the last senator who was not sworn in early after winning the November 2008 election) are listed at the end of the list with no number.

== Terms of service ==
Class	Terms of service of senators that expired in years
Class 2	Terms of service of senators that expired in 2009 (AK, AL, AR, CO, DE, GA, IA, ID, IL, KS, KY, LA, MA, ME, MI, MN, MS, MT, NC, NE, NH, NJ, NM, OK, OR, RI, SC, SD, TN, TX, VA, WV, and WY.)
Class 3	Terms of service of senators that expired in 2011 (AK, AL, AR, AZ, CA, CO, CT, FL, GA, HI, IA, ID, IL, IN, KS, KY, LA, MD, MO, NC, ND, NH, NV, NY, OH, OK, OR, PA, SC, SD, UT, VT, WA, and WI.)
Class 1	Terms of service of senators that expired in 2013 (AZ, CA, CT, DE, FL, HI, IN, MA, MD, ME, MI, MN, MO, MS, MT, ND, NE, NJ, NM, NV, NY, OH, PA, RI, TN, TX, UT, VA, VT, WA, WI, WV, and WY.)

== U.S. Senate seniority list ==
U.S. Senate seniority
Rank	Senator (party-state)	Seniority date	Other factors
1	Robert Byrd (D-WV)	January 3, 1959	
2	Ted Kennedy (D-MA)	November 7, 1962	
3	Daniel Inouye (D-HI)	January 3, 1963	
4	Ted Stevens (R-AK)	December 24, 1968	
5	Pete Domenici (R-NM)	January 3, 1973	New Mexico 37th in population (1970)
6	Joe Biden (D-DE)	January 3, 1973	Delaware 46th in population (1970)
7	Patrick Leahy (D-VT)	January 3, 1975	
8	Richard Lugar (R-IN)	January 3, 1977	Indiana 11th in population (1970)
9	Orrin Hatch (R-UT)	January 3, 1977	Utah 36th in population (1970)
10	Max Baucus (D-MT)	December 15, 1978	
11	Thad Cochran (R-MS)	December 27, 1978	
12	John Warner (R-VA)	January 2, 1979	
13	Carl Levin (D-MI)	January 3, 1979	
14	Chris Dodd (D-CT)	January 3, 1981	Former representative (6 years) - Connecticut 24th in population (1970)
15	Chuck Grassley (R-IA)	January 3, 1981	Former representative (6 years) - Iowa 25th in population (1970)
16	Arlen Specter (R-PA)	January 3, 1981	
17	Jeff Bingaman (D-NM)	January 3, 1983	
18	John Kerry (D-MA)	January 2, 1985	
19	Tom Harkin (D-IA)	January 3, 1985	Former representative
20	Mitch McConnell (R-KY)	January 3, 1985	
21	Jay Rockefeller (D-WV)	January 15, 1985	
22	Barbara Mikulski (D-MD)	January 3, 1987	Former representative (10 years)
23	Richard Shelby (R-AL)	January 3, 1987	Former representative (8 years)
24	John McCain (R-AZ)	January 3, 1987	Former representative (4 years) - Arizona 29th in population (1980)
25	Harry Reid (D-NV)	January 3, 1987	Former representative (4 years) - Nevada 43rd in population (1980)
26	Kit Bond (R-MO)	January 3, 1987	Former governor
27	Kent Conrad (D-ND)	January 3, 1987	
28	Trent Lott (R-MS)	January 3, 1989	Former representative
29	Herb Kohl (D-WI)	January 3, 1989	Wisconsin 16th in population (1980)
30	Joe Lieberman (ID-CT)	January 3, 1989	Connecticut 25th in population (1980)
31	Daniel Akaka (D-HI)	May 16, 1990	
32	Larry Craig (R-ID)	January 3, 1991	
33	Dianne Feinstein (D-CA)	November 10, 1992	
34	Byron Dorgan (D-ND)	December 15, 1992	
35	Barbara Boxer (D-CA)	January 3, 1993	Former representative (10 years)
36	Judd Gregg (R-NH)	January 3, 1993	Former representative (8 years)
37	Russ Feingold (D-WI)	January 3, 1993	Wisconsin 16th in population (1990)
38	Patty Murray (D-WA)	January 3, 1993	Washington 18th in population (1990)
39	Bob Bennett (R-UT)	January 3, 1993	Utah 35th in population (1990)
40	Kay Bailey Hutchison (R-TX)	June 14, 1993	
41	Jim Inhofe (R-OK)	November 17, 1994	
42	Olympia Snowe (R-ME)	January 3, 1995	Former representative (16 years)
43	Jon Kyl (R-AZ)	January 3, 1995	Former representative (8 years)
44	Craig L. Thomas (R-WY)	January 3, 1995	Former representative (6 years)
45	Ron Wyden (D-OR)	February 6, 1996	
46	Sam Brownback (R-KS)	November 7, 1996	
47	Pat Roberts (R-KS)	January 3, 1997	Former representative (16 years)
48	Dick Durbin (D-IL)	January 3, 1997	Former representative (14 years)
49	Tim Johnson (D-SD)	January 3, 1997	Former representative (10 years)
50	Wayne Allard (R-CO)	January 3, 1997	Former representative (6 years) - Colorado 26th in population (1990)
51	Jack Reed (D-RI)	January 3, 1997	Former representative (6 years) - Rhode Island 43rd in population (1990)
52	Mary Landrieu (D-LA)	January 3, 1997	Louisiana 21st in population (1990)
53	Jeff Sessions (R-AL)	January 3, 1997	Alabama 22nd in population (1990)
54	Gordon H. Smith (R-OR)	January 3, 1997	Oregon 29th in population (1990)
55	Chuck Hagel (R-NE)	January 3, 1997	Nebraska 36th in population (1990)
56	Susan Collins (R-ME)	January 3, 1997	Maine 38th in population (1990)
57	Mike Enzi (R-WY)	January 3, 1997	Wyoming 50th in population (1990)
58	Chuck Schumer (D-NY)	January 3, 1999	Former representative (18 years)
59	Jim Bunning (R-KY)	January 3, 1999	Former representative (12 years)
60	Mike Crapo (R-ID)	January 3, 1999	Former representative (6 years)
61	Blanche Lincoln (D-AR)	January 3, 1999	Former representative (4 years)
62	George Voinovich (R-OH)	January 3, 1999	Former governor - Ohio 7th in population (1990)
63	Evan Bayh (D-IN)	January 3, 1999	Former governor - Indiana 15th in population (1990)
64	Bill Nelson (D-FL)	January 3, 2001	Former representative (12 years)
65	Tom Carper (D-DE)	January 3, 2001	Former representative (10 years)
66	Debbie Stabenow (D-MI)	January 3, 2001	Former representative (4 years) - Michigan 8th in population (1990)
67	John Ensign (R-NV)	January 3, 2001	Former representative (4 years) - Nevada 39th in population (1990)
68	Maria Cantwell (D-WA)	January 3, 2001	Former representative (2 years)
69	Ben Nelson (D-NE)	January 3, 2001	Former governor
70	Hillary Clinton (D-NY)	January 3, 2001	
71	John Cornyn (R-TX)	December 2, 2002	
72	Lisa Murkowski (R-AK)	December 20, 2002	
73	Frank Lautenberg (D-NJ)	January 3, 2003	Previously a senator
74	Saxby Chambliss (R-GA)	January 3, 2003	Former representative (8 years) - Georgia ranked 9th in population (2000)
75	Lindsey Graham (R-SC)	January 3, 2003	Former representative (8 years) - South Carolina ranked 24th in population (2000)
76	John E. Sununu (R-NH)	January 3, 2003	Former representative (6 years)
77	Lamar Alexander (R-TN)	January 3, 2003	Former cabinet member, former governor
78	Elizabeth Dole (R-NC)	January 3, 2003	Former cabinet member
79	Norm Coleman (R-MN)	January 3, 2003	Minnesota ranked 21st in population (2000)
80	Mark Pryor (D-AR)	January 3, 2003	Arkansas ranked 32nd in population (2000)
81	Richard Burr (R-NC)	January 3, 2005	Former representative (10 years)
82	Jim DeMint (R-SC)	January 3, 2005	Former representative (6 years) - South Carolina ranked 24th in population (2000)
83	Tom Coburn (R-OK)	January 3, 2005	Former representative (6 years) - Oklahoma ranked 27th in population (2000)
84	John Thune (R-SD)	January 3, 2005	Former representative (6 years) - South Dakota ranked 46th in population (2000)
85	Johnny Isakson (R-GA)	January 3, 2005	Former representative (5 years, 10 months)
86	David Vitter (R-LA)	January 3, 2005	Former representative (5 years, 7 months)
87	Mel Martinez (R-FL)	January 3, 2005	Former cabinet member
88	Barack Obama (D-IL)	January 3, 2005	Illinois ranked 5th in population (2000)
89	Ken Salazar (D-CO)	January 3, 2005	Colorado ranked 22nd in population (2000)
90	Bob Menendez (D-NJ)	January 17, 2006	
91	Ben Cardin (D-MD)	January 3, 2007	Former representative (20 years)
92	Bernie Sanders (I-VT)	January 3, 2007	Former representative (16 years)
93	Sherrod Brown (D-OH)	January 3, 2007	Former representative (14 years)
94	Bob Casey, Jr. (D-PA)	January 3, 2007	Pennsylvania ranked 6th in population (2000)
95	Jim Webb (D-VA)	January 3, 2007	Virginia ranked 12th in population (2000)
96	Bob Corker (R-TN)	January 3, 2007	Tennessee ranked 16th in population (2000)
97	Claire McCaskill (D-MO)	January 3, 2007	Missouri ranked 17th in population (2000)
98	Amy Klobuchar (D-MN)	January 3, 2007	Minnesota ranked 21st in population (2000)
99	Sheldon Whitehouse (D-RI)	January 3, 2007	Rhode Island ranked 43rd in population (2000)
100	Jon Tester (D-MT)	January 3, 2007	Montana ranked 44th in population (2000)
	John Barrasso (R-WY)	June 25, 2007	
	Roger Wicker (R-MS)	December 31, 2007	

The most senior senators by class were Robert Byrd (D-West Virginia) from Class 1, Ted Stevens (R-Alaska) from Class 2, and Daniel Inouye (D-Hawaii) from Class 3.

== See also ==
- 110th United States Congress
- List of United States representatives in the 110th Congress
