= Doris Matsui =

American politician (born 1944)

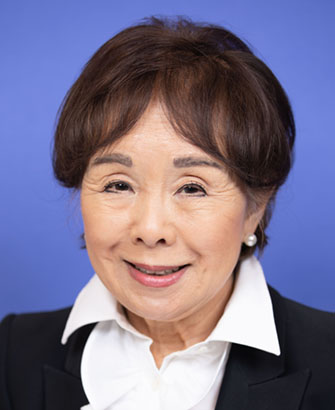
- Matsui in 2022

Member of the U.S. House of Representatives from California
- Incumbent
- Assumed office March 8, 2005 (Note: Matsui's official service begins on the date of the special election, while she was not sworn in until March 10, 2005.)
- Preceded by: Bob Matsui
- Constituency: 5th district (2005–2013); 6th district (2013–2023); 7th district (2023–present)

Personal details
- Born: Doris Kazue Okada; September 25, 1944 (age 82) Poston, Arizona, U.S.
- Party: Democratic
- Spouses: Bob Matsui (m. 1966; died 2005); Roger Sant (m. 2020)
- Children: 1
- Education: University of California, Berkeley (BA)
- Website: House website Campaign website
- Matsui's voice Matsui supporting the Cruise Vessel Security and Safety Act. Recorded November 17, 2009

Doris Kazue Matsui (/ˌmætˈsuːi/ mat-SOO-ee; née Okada; Japanese: 松井 佳寿恵; born September 25, 1944) is an American politician who has served as a member of the United States House of Representatives from California's 7th congressional district since 2005. She succeeded her husband, Bob Matsui. The district, numbered as the 5th from 2005 to 2013 and the 6th from 2013 to 2023, is based in Sacramento.

She is a member of the House Energy and Commerce committee, where she serves as ranking member of the Communications and Technology Subcommittee.

Before her time in Congress, Matsui worked as a government affairs consultant and served as Deputy Assistant to the President in the Clinton Administration, where she worked with President Clinton to create the first White House Initiative on Asian Americans and Pacific Islanders in 1999.

== Early life and career ==
Doris Kazue Okada was born in the Poston War Relocation Center internment camp in Poston, Arizona, and grew up in Dinuba, in California's Central Valley. While attending the University of California, Berkeley, where she earned a B.A. in psychology, she met her husband. They had one child, Brian.

Doris Matsui was a volunteer on Bill Clinton's 1992 presidential campaign. When he was elected, she served on his transition team. After his inauguration, Matsui was appointed deputy special assistant to the president and deputy director of public liaison, working under Alexis Herman. She served in the White House from 1993 to 1998. Clinton appointed Matsui to the board of the Woodrow Wilson International Center for Scholars in September 2000. Later, she became a lobbyist in Washington, representing corporate clients until 2005, when she decided to run for Congress against a field of local Democrats.

== U.S. House of Representatives ==
=== Tenure ===
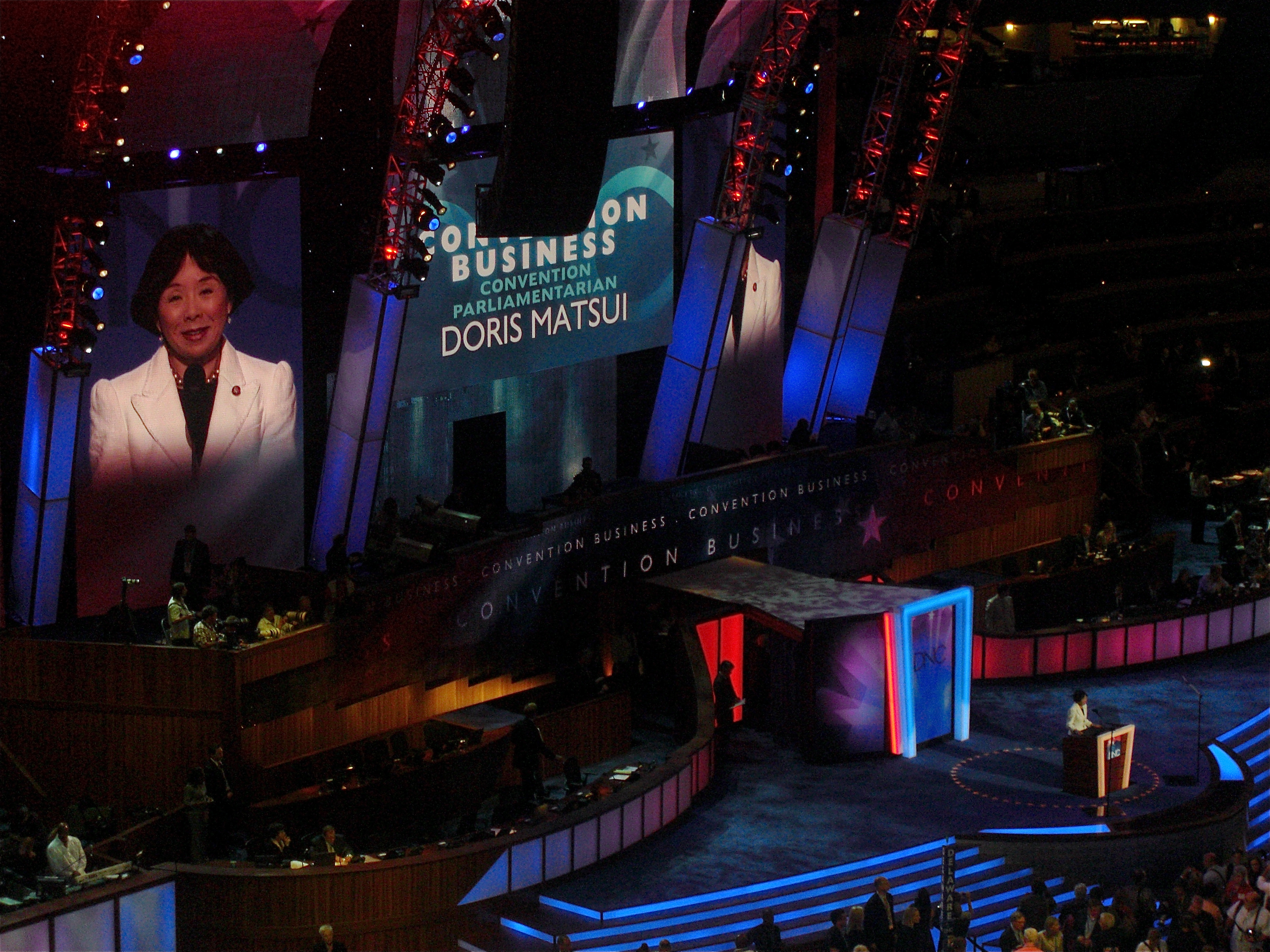
Matsui speaks on the first day of the 2008 Democratic National Convention in Denver, Colorado, in her capacity as convention parliamentarian.

Matsui's husband, Representative Bob Matsui, died from complications of myelodysplastic syndrome on January 1, 2005, two months after being elected to a 14th term in what was then the 5th district. On January 9, 2005, the day after his funeral, Matsui told supporters she was running for his open seat. In the special election on March 8, 2005, she garnered 68% of the vote and was sworn in for the balance of her husband's term. Press reports said that Matsui won the election before the polls opened, as most votes in the election were absentee ballots, which she won overwhelmingly. Matsui was elected to a full term in 2006 and has been reelected continuously since then.

Matsui voted with President Joe Biden's stated position 100% of the time in the 117th Congress, according to a FiveThirtyEight analysis.

==== Women's rights ====
Matsui has voted to continue stem cell research. Matsui opposed the overturning of Roe v. Wade. She called the decision "devastating" and said she was "deeply heartbroken and angered" by it.

On March 8, 2021, on the second anniversary of the U.S. women's national soccer team's pay discrimination lawsuit, Matsui and Rosa DeLauro introduced the Give Our Athletes Level Salaries (GOALS) Act, to ensure the U.S. women's national soccer team was "paid fair and equitable wages compared to the U.S. Men's team". The GOALS Act threatens to cut federal funding for the 2026 World Cup if the U.S. Soccer Federation does not comply.

==== Energy and the environment ====
Matsui supports American energy independence and desires that the U.S. run on at least 25% renewable energy by 2025. Matsui opposes the expansion of oil production, offshore drilling, and subsidies for oil and gas exploration. She voted to provide tax subsidies for investment in renewable, alternative sources of energy.

==== Foreign policy ====
Matsui supports United States military and economic aid to Ukraine. Matsui has supported Israel’s right to exist and defend itself, but she has been critical of Benjamin Netanyahu and his government. Matsui supports a 2-state solution. While Matsui has supported military aid to Israel for most of her career, in July 2026 she voted for Thomas Massie’s amendment to cut US aid to Israel. Matsui does not recognize the Gaza Genocide. Matsui is critical of the Iran War.

==== LGBTQ+ rights ====
Matsui was given a rating of 100% by the HRC in 2006. She opposes discrimination in the workplace and in schools based on sexual orientation. She supported the repeal of don't ask, don't tell and sought the reinstatement of gay soldiers who had been discharged from the military.

==== Gun control ====
Matsui seeks to expand gun control and supports stricter regulations on gun purchases and sales. She supports banning large-scale purchases of ammunition and seeks to end the gun show loophole. Matsui supports firearms manufacturers being held responsible for product misuse cases and lawsuits.

==== Health care ====
In a discussion about the Patient Protection and Affordable Care Act, Matsui said that as "more Americans get to know and understand the law, and feel its effects in their lives, the less the public will want to see us take steps back to the broken health care system we have experienced for decades in this country." She has opposed many attempts to repeal, reduce, or privatize Medicare or Medicaid. In addition, Matsui has sought to expand medical coverage to children and the mentally ill. She voted against patients being denied treatment for non-emergency issues without a Medicare copay.

==== Taxes and pensions ====
Matsui supports a progressive tax system and seeks to shut down offshore loopholes for business. She voted against continuing capital gains and dividend tax breaks. She supports extending AMT exemptions which benefit higher-income taxpayers in states like California with high state income taxes.

Matsui favors continuing Social Security as it is now, and has opposed moves to privatize it or allow citizens the option to have alternative retirement funds. She also opposes raising the retirement age.

=== Committee assignments ===
For the 119th Congress:

- Committee on Energy and Commerce
  - Subcommittee on Communications and Technology (Ranking Member)
  - Subcommittee on Energy

=== Caucuses and other memberships ===
- Junior League of Sacramento, CA
- Congressional Arts Caucus
- Congressional Asian Pacific American Caucus
- Congressional Wildlife Refuge Caucus
- Sustainable Energy and Environment Coalition (SEEC), Co-Chair
- Congressional Food Allergy Research Caucus, Co-Chair
- Rare Disease Caucus, Co-Chair
- Congressional High-Tech Caucus, Co-Chair
- Congressional Spectrum Caucus, Co-Chair
- National Service Congressional Caucus, Co-Chair
- Congressional Caucus to Cure Blood Cancers and Other Blood Disorders, Co-Chair
- House Democratic Caucus Task Force on Aging and Families, Co-Chair
- Smithsonian Board of Regents
- Congressional Mental Health Caucus
- Democratic Women's Caucus
- Congressional Equality Caucus
- Gun Violence Prevention Task Force

== Personal life ==
Matsui has one son. She has two grandchildren. On April 11, 2020, Matsui married AES Corporation co-founder and billionaire Roger Sant.

== Electoral history ==
Electoral history of Doris Matsui
Year	Office		Party	Primary			General			Result	Swing	Ref.
Year	Office		Party	Total	%	P.	Total	%	P.	Result	Swing	Ref.
2005	U.S. House	5th	Democratic	56,175	67.65%	1st				Won	Hold	
2006	U.S. House	5th	Democratic	52,951	100.0%	1st	105,676	70.80%	1st	Won	Hold	
2008	U.S. House	5th	Democratic	51,006	100.0%	1st	164,242	74.27%	1st	Won	Hold	
2010	U.S. House	5th	Democratic	56,762	100.0%	1st	124,220	72.05%	1st	Won	Hold	
2012	U.S. House	6th	Democratic	67,174	71.40%	1st	160,667	75.05%	1st	Won	Hold	
2014	U.S. House	6th	Democratic	62,640	73.60%	1st	97,008	72.69%	1st	Won	Hold	
2016	U.S. House	6th	Democratic	99,599	70.38%	1st	177,565	75.43%	1st	Won	Hold	
2018	U.S. House	6th	Democratic	99,789	87.85%	1st	162,411	80.43%	1st	Won	Hold	
2020	U.S. House	6th	Democratic	119,408	70.19%	1st	229,648	73.34%	1st	Won	Hold	
2022	U.S. House	7th	Democratic	94,896	63.19%	1st	150,618	68.26%	1st	Won	Hold	
2024	U.S. House	7th	Democratic	89,485	56.46%	1st	197,429	66.75%	1st	Won	Hold	
2026	U.S. House	7th	Democratic	61,114	29.09%	2nd	TBD					
Source: Secretary of State of California | Statewide Election Results

== See also ==
- List of Asian Americans and Pacific Islander Americans in the United States Congress
- Women in the United States House of Representatives

U.S. House of Representatives
Preceded by Bob Matsui	Member of the U.S. House of Representatives from California's 5th congressional district 2005–2013	Succeeded by Mike Thompson
Preceded by Lynn Woolsey	Member of the U.S. House of Representatives from California's 6th congressional district 2013–2023	Succeeded by Ami Bera
Preceded by Ami Bera	Member of the U.S. House of Representatives from California's 7th congressional district 2023–present	Incumbent
Party political offices
Preceded by Donna Edwards	Chair of the Democratic Women's Working Group; 2015–2017	Succeeded by Lois Frankel
U.S. order of precedence (ceremonial)
Preceded by Debbie Wasserman Schultz	United States representatives by seniority 52nd	Succeeded by Gus Bilirakis
Preceded by Jim Costa	Order of precedence of the United States	Succeeded by Hank Johnson
