= Anna Eshoo =

American politician (born 1942)

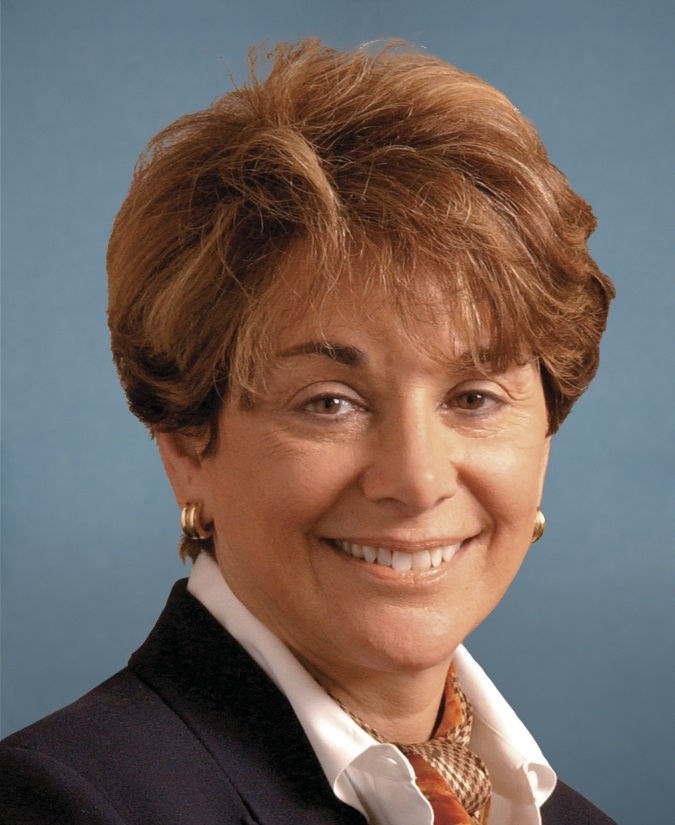
- Official portrait, 2013

Member of the U.S. House of Representatives from California
- In office January 3, 1993 – January 3, 2025
- Preceded by: Tom Campbell (redistricted)
- Succeeded by: Sam Liccardo
- Constituency: 14th district (1993–2013); 18th district (2013–2023); 16th district (2023–2025)

Personal details
- Born: Anna Georges; December 13, 1942 (age 83) New Britain, Connecticut, U.S.
- Party: Democratic
- Spouse: George Eshoo (divorced)
- Children: 2
- Education: Cañada College (AA)
- Eshoo's voice Eshoo on congressional oversight of the Executive Branch. Recorded May 27, 2010

Anna A. Eshoo (/ˈɛʃuː/ EH-shoo; née Georges; born December 13, 1942) is an American politician who served as the U.S. representative for California's 16th congressional district from 1993 to 2025. She is a member of the Democratic Party.

The district, numbered as the 14th district from 1993 to 2013 and the 18th district from 2013 to 2023, is based in Silicon Valley, including the cities of Redwood City, Sunnyvale, Mountain View, and Palo Alto, as well as a sliver of San Jose. Eshoo was the only Assyrian-American in Congress and the only Armenian American woman in Congress during her tenure in office. On November 21, 2023, she announced she would not seek re-election in 2024.

== Early life and education ==
Anna Eshoo was born in New Britain, Connecticut, of Assyrian and Armenian heritage. Her mother had fled from Armenia to Iraq, and subsequently to the United States. Her father, Fred Georges, a jeweler and watchmaker, was a Chaldean Christian.

Eshoo graduated from New Britain High School in 1960, and later moved to California. She received an Associate of Arts degree in English from Cañada College in 1975.

== Early political career ==
Eshoo was Chair of the San Mateo Democratic Party from 1978 to 1982. She was also a member of the Democratic National Committee in the 1980s. She was chief of staff to Speaker pro tempore Leo McCarthy of the California State Assembly in 1981–82. Eshoo was elected to the San Mateo County Board of Supervisors in 1982 and served until 1992. She was president of the board in 1986.

== U.S. House of Representatives ==
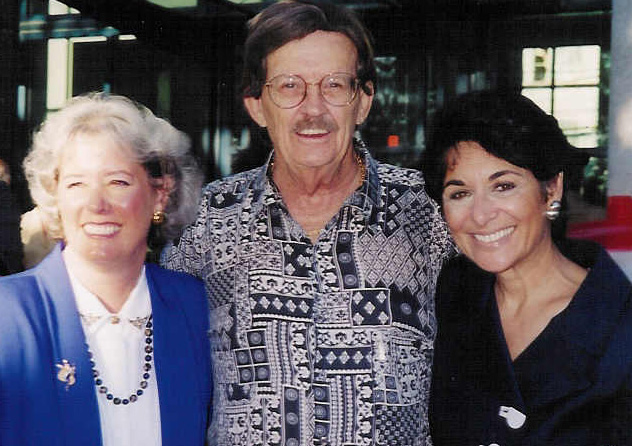
Diane Howard, Don Saye, and Congresswoman Anna Eshoo (right)

=== Elections ===
==== 1988 ====
In the middle of Eshoo's second term on the San Mateo County Board of Supervisors, she ran for Congress in California's 12th congressional district. She won the Democratic primary with a plurality of 43%, but lost the general election to Republican Stanford law professor Tom Campbell, 51–46%.

==== 1992 ====
Campbell gave up his congressional seat to make an unsuccessful bid for the United States Senate, and Eshoo entered the Democratic primary for the open seat, which had been renumbered as the 14th district. She won the seven-way primary with a plurality of 40%.

In the general election, she defeated the Republican nominee, San Mateo County Supervisor Tom Huening, 57%–39%.

==== 1994 ====
She survived the Republican Revolution, winning reelection with 61% of the vote.

==== 2008 ====
She won reelection against Republican Ronny Santana, 70–22%.

==== 2010 ====
She won reelection against Republican Dave Chapman, 69–28%.

==== 2012 ====
After redistricting, Eshoo ran for and won reelection in California's 18th congressional district based in San Mateo, Santa Clara, and Santa Cruz counties.

==== 2014 ====
After a bitter race that brought to the fore some dissatisfaction over party leadership, regarded as a proxy battle between Steny Hoyer and Nancy Pelosi, Eshoo lost a party vote to Frank Pallone for ranking member of the House Energy and Commerce Committee. Nancy Pelosi had said Eshoo's elevation to the top Democratic spot on that committee would be important for the Democrats, allowing Eshoo "to tap into lucrative fundraising interests in Silicon Valley and elsewhere that the committee has jurisdiction."

==== 2020 ====
Eshoo beat challenger Rishi Kumar in the Democratic primary and was reelected in the general election.

==== 2022 ====
Eshoo beat challenger Rishi Kumar in a rematch.

=== Tenure ===
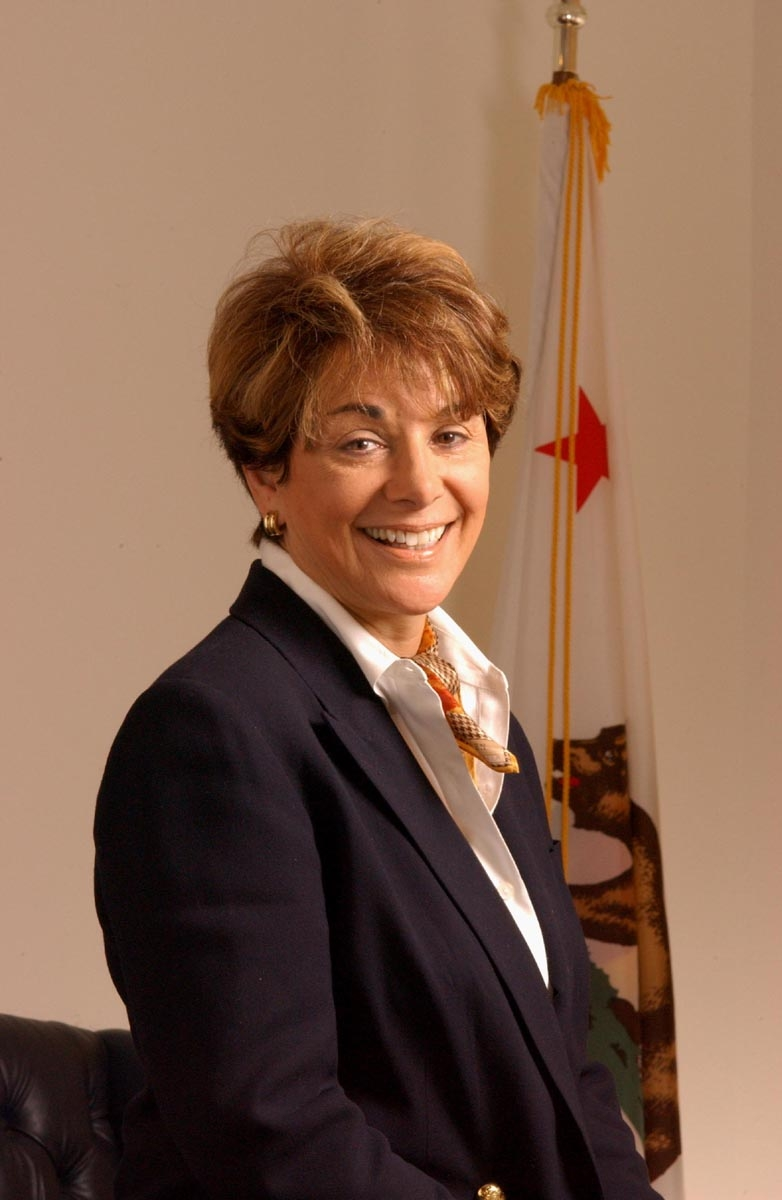
Eshoo's congressional portrait, 2008

In 2003, Eshoo was elected by her Democratic colleagues in the 108th Congress as an At-Large Democratic Whip, and she has served in that position to the present.

On January 30, 2008, Eshoo formally endorsed U.S. Senator Barack Obama for president.

Eshoo voted with President Joe Biden's stated position 100% of the time in the 117th Congress, according to a FiveThirtyEight analysis. This results in a Biden Plus/Minus score of +0.4.

==== Abortion ====
Eshoo opposed the overturning of Roe v. Wade. In 2024, she signed an amicus brief to the consolidated cases of Moyle v. United States and Idaho v. United States urging the Supreme Court to uphold the right to medical abortions under the Emergency Medical Treatment and Active Labor Act (EMTALA).

==== Biodefense ====
On July 16, 2018, Eshoo introduced H.R. 6378, the Pandemic and All Hazards Preparedness and Advancing Innovation Act (PAHPA), along with Representative Susan Brooks, Energy and Commerce Committee Chairman Greg Walden, and Ranking Member Frank Pallone. The September 11 attacks and the deadly anthrax attacks that followed motivated Eshoo and former Representative Richard Burr to create the original PAHPA law, which coordinated responses to public health emergencies and developed medical countermeasures.

H.R. 6378 improves preparedness nationwide and response for public health emergencies by speeding up research and development on medical countermeasures. The bill also focuses on the needs of special populations such as seniors, the disabled, and children.

In March 2018, Eshoo and Brooks launched the Congressional Biodefense Caucus. Within a week, 21 members of Congress had joined. The caucus is "dedicated to strengthening our nation's biodefense enterprise and national security." It will focus on chemical, biological, radiological, and nuclear (CBRN) threats and pandemic outbreaks.

==== Campaign finance reform ====
Eshoo's bill to require presidential and vice-presidential candidates to publicly disclose their last 10 federal tax returns was included in the For the People Act. She has said, "The For the People Act is a once-in-a-generation opportunity to restore the faith and function of American democracy".

==== Energy policy ====
Eshoo has voted in favor of bills that expand the creation of jobs in renewable energy. She has also supported energy tax credits for companies that use alternative, non-carbon fuel sources. More recently, she has expressed support for the continued funding of research into fusion power. She is also a supporter of Green New Deal policies and is a co-sponsor of the House resolutions calling for Green New Deal legislation as an effort to combat climate change.

In February 2023, Eshoo, along with Representatives Randy Weber (R‑TX 14th), Lizzie Fletcher (D‑TX 07th), Nancy Mace (R‑SC 01st), Abigail Spanberger (D‑VA 07th), and Don Davis (D‑NC 01st), introduced the Reinvesting in Shoreline Economies and Ecosystems Act, which aims to share federal offshore wind power revenue with states for coastal protection and restoration work. The bill was also introduced in the Senate.

==== Health care ====
Eshoo worked on the Affordable Care Act and was present during its signing. She believes in adding a public option to the Act to achieve universal health insurance.

==== Human rights ====
Eshoo is a strong supporter of the gay rights movement. In 1992, when a gay-bashing mailer was directed at Supervisor Tom Nolan (the first openly gay supervisor in San Mateo and her opponent for her congressional seat), Eshoo stood fast in defending him, his record and years of service. She opposed the Marriage Protection Amendment and the Marriage Protection Act. Her website called the bill "discriminatory, singling out for the first time a minority to prevent their interests from being considered by the highest courts in the land."

As one of just two Assyrian members of Congress, Eshoo has worked hard to protect indigenous Assyrian Christians in Iraq from continuing religious persecution and political exclusion. She authored an amendment to H.R. 2601, the Foreign Relations Authorization Act, stating that "special attention should be paid to the welfare of Chaldo-Assyrians and other indigenous Christians in Iraq."

Eshoo has been a strong supporter of the congressional resolution recognizing the Armenian genocide. She also supports closer ties between Armenia and the U.S.

Eshoo has fought strongly against certain provisions of the Patriot Act, particularly Section 215 (Access to Business Records), which gives federal investigators the right to obtain any tangible business record without a subpoena.

Eshoo also introduced "Kevin's law", which would have given the U.S. Department of Agriculture the power to close down plants that produce contaminated meat.

As an Assyrian and Armenian American, Eshoo was co-chair and co-founder of the Religious Minorities in the Middle East Caucus. She also serves on the Board of Advisors of The Institute on Religion and Public Policy, a freedom of religion organization.

In August 2024, Eshoo called on the Food and Drug Administration to scrutinize clinical trials conducted in the People's Republic of China for threats to intellectual property and forced participation using the Uyghur people.

==== Immigration ====
Eshoo has worked to create a legal "pathway to citizenship" for foreign workers of all kinds, from doctors and computer programmers to migrant farm workers. She has voted to increase the annual cap on H-1B visas to allow more temporary foreign professionals to work in the United States (especially those with Master's Degrees or higher).

In California, where as much as 90% of the agricultural workforce is composed of undocumented immigrants, Eshoo cosponsored H.R. 371, the Agricultural Jobs Act, which would confer blue-card status on undocumented immigrants who had worked an agricultural job in the United States for 150 days or more. This bill never became law.

==== Infrastructure ====
Eshoo has expressed support for President Biden's American Jobs Plan, calling it "a visionary proposal to create millions of good-paying jobs while revitalizing America's infrastructure" that "will bring the U.S. into the 21st century".

Eshoo has long advocated for public transportation, particularly Caltrain, a commitment that Caltrain honored with the first dedicated trainset of the 2024 Stadler KISS fleet.

==== Israel–Palestine ====
On May 24, 2023, Eshoo expressed support for the wave of peaceful pro-democracy activism in Israel against the judicial overhaul legislation proposed by Prime Minister Benjamin Netanyahu's government.

In November 2023, amid the Gaza War, Eshoo declined to sign the Ceasefire Now Resolution where she contended that it allowed impunity for Hamas. Later that month, in Palo Alto, demonstrators gathered at the congressional offices in the Bay Area demanded Eshoo to call for a ceasefire in Gaza, to which she responded, "...While I have consistently pressed the IDF to take precautions to protect civilians, I have not called for a permanent ceasefire because I believe Hamas must be removed from power in Gaza...because they have no regard for the welfare of the Palestinians they claim to represent." Furthermore, Eshoo had called on Israel to implement a humanitarian pause in Gaza and for Israel to show some restraint.

==== Taxes ====
Eshoo voted against the Tax Cuts and Jobs Act of 2017 and has expressed support for repealing the SALT deduction cap, which she views as an unfair burden on the middle class.

==== National security ====
On July 29, 2015, Eshoo co-introduced H.R. 3299, the Strengthening Public Health Emergency Response Act of 2015, which would streamline government decisions and provide incentives for vaccines and treatment of dangerous pathogens and diseases. Eshoo co-sponsored the legislation with lead sponsor Rep. Susan Brooks in response to an October 2015 report by the Blue Ribbon Study Panel on Biodefense.

Other legislation includes:

- H.R. 1275, American Dream Act, cosponsor – Allows states to provide tuition to students that are illegal immigrants, provided they meet certain criteria.
- H.R. 1379, Citizen Promotion Act, cosponsor – Assists lawfully admitted aliens in becoming permanent citizens of the United States.
- H.R. 2221, Uniting American Families Act, cosponsor – Amends the Immigration and Nationality Act to include "or permanent partner" where spouse occurs.

==== Technology ====
Eshoo authored two bills authorizing electronic signatures that became law, The Government Paperwork Elimination Act of 1998 (GPEA) and ESIGN. She also introduced controversial legislation to alleviate the proliferation of unsolicited email, known as spam. The U.S. House of Representatives passed The CAN-SPAM Act of 2003 (S. 877), which authorizes a "Do Not Spam" list, regulates commercial email, and imposes fines on spammers. Eshoo authored the Consumer Internet Privacy Enhancement Act of 2001 (H.R. 237), created a program to provide discounts to schools and libraries for Internet access, and authored the Computer Donation Incentive Act.

Eshoo introduced HR 2428, the Broadband Conduit Deployment Act of 2009. The bill would require new federal road projects to include plastic conduits buried along the side of the roadway, and enough of them to "accommodate multiple broadband providers". "According to industry experts, more than half of the cost of new broadband deployment is attributable to the expense of tearing up and repaving roads", Eshoo said. "By putting the broadband conduit in place while the ground beneath the roadways is exposed, we will enable any authorized communications provider to come in later and install fiber-optic cable at far less cost." The bill is supported by Google.

Together with Rep. Ed Markey, Eshoo introduced the Internet Freedom Preservation Act of 2009, which would make net neutrality the law.

Eshoo is co-chair of the Congressional Internet Caucus, a bipartisan group of over 150 members of the House and Senate working to educate their colleagues about the promise and potential of the Internet.

Eshoo supported the Federal Communications Commission Process Reform Act of 2013 (H.R. 3675; 113th Congress), a bill that would make a number of changes to procedures that the Federal Communications Commission (FCC) follows in its rulemaking processes. The FCC would have to act more transparently as a result of this bill, forced to accept public input about regulations. Eshoo expected Senate support for the bill, saying that they "shouldn't find it menacing" and arguing that the bill was "about the functioning of the FCC in the 21st century."

In 2022, Eshoo, Representative Jan Schakowsky, and Senator Cory Booker introduced the Banning Surveillance Advertising Act (BSAA). Frank Maggio, CEO and founder of React LLC, called the BSAA "rife with loopholes". The act was tabled. According to PC Magazine, some browsers with some extensions can block some surveillance and some advertising.

=== Committee assignments ===
For the 118th Congress:

- Committee on Energy and Commerce
  - Subcommittee on Communications and Technology
  - Subcommittee on Health (Ranking Member)

=== Caucus memberships ===
- Congressional E-911 Caucus, Co-Chair
- Arthritis Caucus, Co-Chair
- Caucus on Religious Minorities in the Middle East, Co-Chair and Founding Member
- Cancer Care Working Group, Co-Chair
- House 21st Century Health Care Caucus, Vice Chair
- House Information Technology Working Group, Co-Chair
- Congressional Internet Caucus, Founding Member and Co-Chair
- House Medical Technology Caucus, Co-Chair
- Ahmadiyya Muslim Caucus
- Bipartisan Congressional Task Force on Alzheimer's Disease
- California Democratic Congressional Delegation
- Armenian Caucus
- Coalition for Autism Research and Education (CARE)
- Congressional Biomedical Research Caucus
- Congressional Caucus for Women's Issues
- Congressional Caucus on Armenian Issues
- Congressional Diabetes Caucus
- Congressional Equality Caucus
- Congressional Food Safety Caucus
- Congressional Kidney Caucus
- Congressional Organic Caucus
- Congressional Prevention Coalition
- Congressional Shipbuilding Caucus
- Congressional Taiwan Caucus
- Congressional Wildlife Refuge Caucus
- House Biotechnology Caucus
- House Cancer Caucus
- House National Marine Sanctuary Caucus
- House Oceans Caucus
- House Recycling Caucus
- Long-Term Care Caucus
- United States-Philippines Friendship Caucus
- Congressional Arts Caucus
- Congressional NextGen 9-1-1 Caucus
- Climate Solutions Caucus
- Congressional Coalition on Adoption
- Rare Disease Caucus

== Personal life ==
Eshoo was married to attorney George Eshoo, with whom she has two children, Karen and Paul. Anna Eshoo and George Eshoo are divorced. She resides in Menlo Park, California. She is a Chaldean Catholic. She attends Sacred Heart-Oakwood Catholic Church.

In 2010, Eshoo was named one of the "50 Most Beautiful People" on Capitol Hill by The Hill.

== Organizations ==
- Chair, San Mateo County General Hospital Board of Directors, 1984–1992
- Member, American Association of University Women
- Former Chair, Bay Area Air Quality Management District
- Former Member, Bay Conservation and Development Commission
- Democratic Activists for Women Now
- Junior League of Palo Alto
- League of Conservation Voters
- Member, League of Women Voters
- Co Founder, San Mateo Women's Hall of Fame.

== Awards and honors ==
- 1989 Legislator of the Year Award from the California's Governor's Committee on the Employing of the Disabled
- 1991 Margaret Sanger Community Service Award from San Mateo County Planned Parenthood
- 1990 Friend of BAYMEC Award
- 1989 Public Official of the Year by the State Commission on Aging
- 1987 Humanitarian of the Year by Easter Seal
- First woman to join her local chapter of Kiwanis International.
- Honorary doctorate, Humane Letters, Menlo College

== See also ==
- Women in the United States House of Representatives
- List of Arab and Middle Eastern Americans in the United States Congress

U.S. House of Representatives
Preceded by John Doolittle	Member of the U.S. House of Representatives from California's 14th congressional district 1993–2013	Succeeded by Jackie Speier
Preceded by Dennis Cardoza	Member of the U.S. House of Representatives from California's 18th congressional district 2013–2023	Succeeded by Zoe Lofgren
Preceded by Jim Costa	Member of the U.S. House of Representatives from California's 16th congressional district 2023–2025	Succeeded by Sam Liccardo
U.S. order of precedence (ceremonial)
Preceded by David Dreier as Former U.S. Representative	Order of precedence of the United States as Former U.S. Representative	Succeeded by Edolphus Towns as Former U.S. Representative
