= United States House Science Subcommittee on Energy =

Subcommittees of the United States House Committee on Science, Space and Technology

Subcommittee of Committee on Science, Space, and Technology
- Active United States House of Representatives; 119th Congress

Leadership
- Chair: Randy Weber (R)
- Ranking Member: Deborah K. Ross (D)

Structure
- Seats: 14 (14 currently filled) 8/8 6/6
- Political parties: Majority (8): Republican (8); Minority (6): Democratic (6)

Meeting place
- 2321, Rayburn House Office Building; Washington, D.C. 20515

Phone number
- (202)-225-6371

The Science Subcommittee on Energy is one of five subcommittees of the United States House Committee on Science, Space and Technology.

In 2007, the subcommittee held the first Congressional hearing on global climate change for the 110th Congress. The Hearing on the State of Climate Change Science 2007: The Findings of the Fourth Assessment Report by the Intergovernmental Panel on Climate Change (IPCC), Working Group I Report, included four climate scientists who authored the Intergovernmental Panel on Climate Change (IPCC) assessment report and Speaker Nancy Pelosi.

== Jurisdiction ==
Legislative jurisdiction and general oversight and investigative authority on all matters relating to energy research, development, and demonstration and projects therefor, commercial application of energy technology, and environmental research including:

- Department of Energy research, development, and demonstration programs;
- Department of Energy laboratories;
- Department of Energy science activities;
- energy supply activities;
- nuclear, solar and renewable energy, and other advanced energy technologies;
- uranium supply and enrichment, and Department of Energy waste management and environment, safety, and health activities as appropriate;
- fossil energy research and development;
- clean coal technology;
- energy conservation research and development;
- energy aspects of climate change;
- pipeline research, development, and demonstration projects;
- energy and environmental standards;
- energy conservation including building performance, alternate fuels for and improved efficiency of vehicles, distributed power systems, and industrial process improvements;
- Environmental Protection Agency research and development programs;
- National Oceanic and Atmospheric Administration, including all activities related to weather, weather services, climate, and the atmosphere, and marine fisheries, and oceanic research;
- risk assessment activities; and
- scientific issues related to environmental policy, including climate change.

== History ==
Chairs of the subcommittee:

- Judy Biggert (R), Illinois, 2005–2007
- Nick Lampson (D), Texas, 2007–2009
- Brian Baird (D), Washington, 2009–2011
- Andy Harris (R), Maryland, 2011–2013
- Cynthia Lummis (R), Wyoming, 2013–2015
- Randy Weber (R), Texas, 2015–2019
- Conor Lamb (D), Pennsylvania, 2019–2020
- Lizzie Fletcher (D), Texas, 2020–2021
- Jamaal Bowman (D), New York, 2021–2023
- Brandon Williams (R), New York, 2023–2025
- Randy Weber (R), Texas, 2025–present

== Members, 119th Congress ==
Majority	Minority
Randy Weber, Texas, New York, Chair; Jim Baird, Indiana; Chuck Fleischmann, Tennessee; Claudia Tenney, New York; Pat Harrigan, North Carolina; Jeff Hurd, Colorado; Sheri Biggs, South Carolina; Nick Begich III, Alaska	Deborah Ross, North Carolina, Ranking Member; Andrea Salinas, Oregon; Sylvester Turner, Texas (until March 5, 2025); Laura Friedman, California; Josh Riley, New York; Valerie Foushee, North Carolina
Ex officio
Brian Babin, Texas	Zoe Lofgren, California

== Historical membership rosters ==
=== 115th Congress ===
Majority	Minority
Randy Weber, Texas, Chairman; Steve Knight, California, Vice Chair; Dana Rohrabacher, California; Frank Lucas, Oklahoma; Mo Brooks, Alabama; Randy Hultgren, Illinois; Thomas Massie, Kentucky; Jim Bridenstine, Oklahoma; Darin LaHood, Illinois; Daniel Webster, Florida; Neal Dunn, Florida	Marc Veasey, Texas, Ranking Member; Zoe Lofgren, California; Dan Lipinski, Illinois; Jacky Rosen, Nevada; Jerry McNerney, California; Paul Tonko, New York; Bill Foster, Illinois; Mark Takano, California

=== 116th Congress ===
Majority	Minority
Lizzie Fletcher, Texas, Chair; Dan Lipinski, Illinois; Haley Stevens, Michigan; Kendra Horn, Oklahoma; Jerry McNerney, California; Bill Foster, Illinois; Sean Casten, Illinois; Conor Lamb, Pennsylvania	Randy Weber, Texas, Ranking Member; Andy Biggs, Arizona; Ralph Norman, South Carolina; Michael Cloud, Texas; Jim Baird, Indiana
Ex officio
Eddie Bernice Johnson, Texas	Frank Lucas, Oklahoma

=== 117th Congress ===
Majority	Minority
Jamaal Bowman, New York, Chair; Suzanne Bonamici, Oregon; Haley Stevens, Michigan; Melanie Stansbury, New Mexico (since June 15, 2021); Jerry McNerney, California; Donald Norcross, New Jersey; Sean Casten, Illinois; Conor Lamb, Pennsylvania; Deborah Ross, North Carolina	Randy Weber, Texas, Ranking Member; Jim Baird, Indiana; Mike Garcia, California; Randy Feenstra, Iowa; Carlos A. Giménez, Florida; Peter Meijer, Michigan
Ex officio
Eddie Bernice Johnson, Texas	Frank Lucas, Oklahoma

=== 118th Congress ===
Majority	Minority
Brandon William, New York, Chair; Randy Weber, Texas; Jim Baird, Indiana; Stephanie Bice, Oklahoma; Chuck Fleischmann, Tennessee; Claudia Tenney, New York; Max Miller, Ohio; Tom Kean Jr., New Jersey	Jamaal Bowman, New York, Ranking Member; Summer Lee, Pennsylvania; Deborah Ross, North Carolina; Eric Sorensen, Illinois; Andrea Salinas, Oregon; Valerie Foushee, North Carolina
Ex officio
Frank Lucas, Oklahoma	Zoe Lofgren, California
