= Huening =

Huening is a surname. Notable people with the surname include:

- Kai Kamal Huening (born 2002), American singer and songwriter
- Tom Huening, American author, politician, and businessman
