= Austin Scott =

American politician (born 1969)

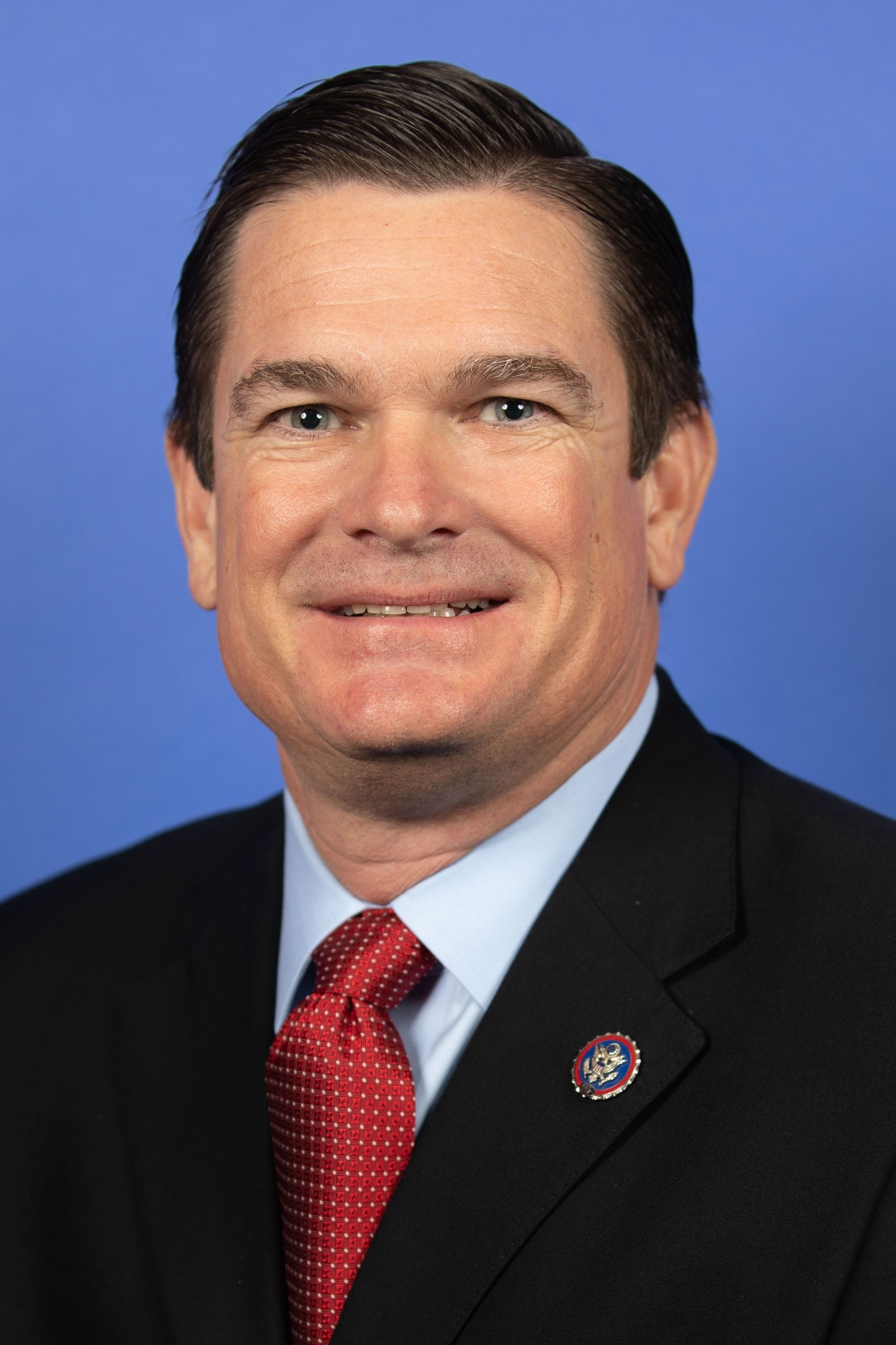
- Official portrait, c. 2022

Member of the U.S. House of Representatives from Georgia's 8th district
- Incumbent
- Assumed office January 3, 2011
- Preceded by: Jim Marshall

Member of the Georgia House of Representatives
- In office 1996–2011
- Preceded by: Henry Bostick
- Succeeded by: Tony McBrayer
- Constituency: 165th district (1996–2003); 138th district (2003–2005); 153rd district (2005–2011)

Personal details
- Born: December 10, 1969 (age 56) Augusta, Georgia, U.S.
- Party: Republican
- Spouse: Vivien Scott
- Children: 3
- Education: University of Georgia (BBA)
- Website: House website Campaign website
- Scott's voice Scott supporting the Agriculture Improvement Act of 2018. Recorded December 12, 2018

James Austin Scott (born December 10, 1969) is an American politician who is the U.S. representative for Georgia's 8th congressional district, serving since 2011. Scott served as a Republican member of the Georgia House of Representatives before being elected to the U.S. House. He is the most senior Republican currently serving in Georgia's congressional delegation.

== Early life, education, and career ==
Scott's father, Jim, is an orthopedic surgeon and his mother, Becky, is a teacher in the public school system. Scott graduated from the University of Georgia with a Bachelor of Business Administration in risk management and insurance. He passed the Series 7 Exam.

Scott is president of the Southern Group, LLC and a partner in Lockett Station Group, LLC.

== Georgia Legislature ==
Scott was first elected to the Georgia House of Representatives at the age of 26. He chaired the Governmental Affairs Committee and served on the Appropriations, Rules, and Ways and Means Committee, where he chaired the Public Policy Subcommittee. The district he represented comprises Tift and Turner Counties.

In 2001, Scott was the first Republican in the Georgia House to work with Democrats to remove the Confederate battle emblem from the state's flag.

== U.S. House of Representatives ==
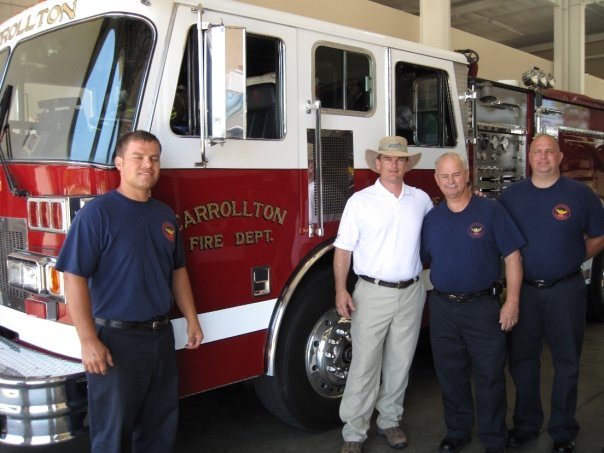
Scott with members of the Carrollton, Georgia, fire department in 2009

=== Elections ===
==== 2010 ====
With millions of dollars in campaign donations from national PACs, Scott challenged Democratic incumbent Jim Marshall in Georgia's 8th congressional district. He defeated Marshall in the November 2 general election with 53% of the vote to Marshall's 47%.

Scott originally planned to campaign for governor of Georgia, announcing his campaign in January 2009. He made headlines for walking more than 1,000 miles around the state in his "Walk of Georgia", introducing a bill to abolish tolls on Georgia 400 and leading the charge in pressuring Georgia State Attorney General Thurbert Baker to file suit against the federal government over the Affordable Care Act. In April 2010, Scott withdrew from the race for governor to run for Congress.

In 2010, Scott signed a pledge sponsored by Americans for Prosperity promising to vote against any global warming legislation that would raise taxes.

==== 2012 ====
During his first term, Scott represented a fairly compact district in the center of the state, from Macon to Moultrie.

Redistricting after the 2010 census made the 8th somewhat more secure for Scott. Notably, a large chunk of the district's black residents were drawn into the neighboring 2nd district. This included most of Macon and surrounding Bibb County (except for a sliver in the north); Macon had been the heart of the 8th and its predecessors for more than a century. To make up for the loss of population, the General Assembly pushed the 8th all the way to the Florida border, adding Thomasville and most of Valdosta from the old 2nd. The old 8th already had a significant Republican lean, with a Cook Partisan Voting Index of R+10. The new 8th had a CPVI of R+15, making it the 11th most Republican district in the Eastern Time Zone and one of the most Republican districts in the country.

Scott was unopposed in both the primary and general elections.

==== 2014 ====
Scott was unopposed for a third term.

==== 2016 ====
In 2016, Scott faced a Democratic opponent for the first time since his initial run for the seat, private investigator James Neal Harris. Scott defeated Harris with 67.6% of the vote, carrying every county in the district.

==== 2018 ====
Scott was unopposed for a fifth term.

==== 2020 ====
On June 9, Scott defeated his Republican primary opponents, Vance Dean and Danny Ellyson, with 89.81% of the vote. For only the second time since his initial run for the seat, he faced a Democratic challenger, Lindsay Holliday. Scott defeated Holliday with 64.52% of the vote in the November 3 general election.

==== 2022 ====
In 2022, Scott faced Democrat Darrius Butler and won with 68.58% of the vote.

==== 2024 ====
In 2024, Scott again faced Democrat Darrius Butler and won with 68.92% of the vote.

=== Tenure ===
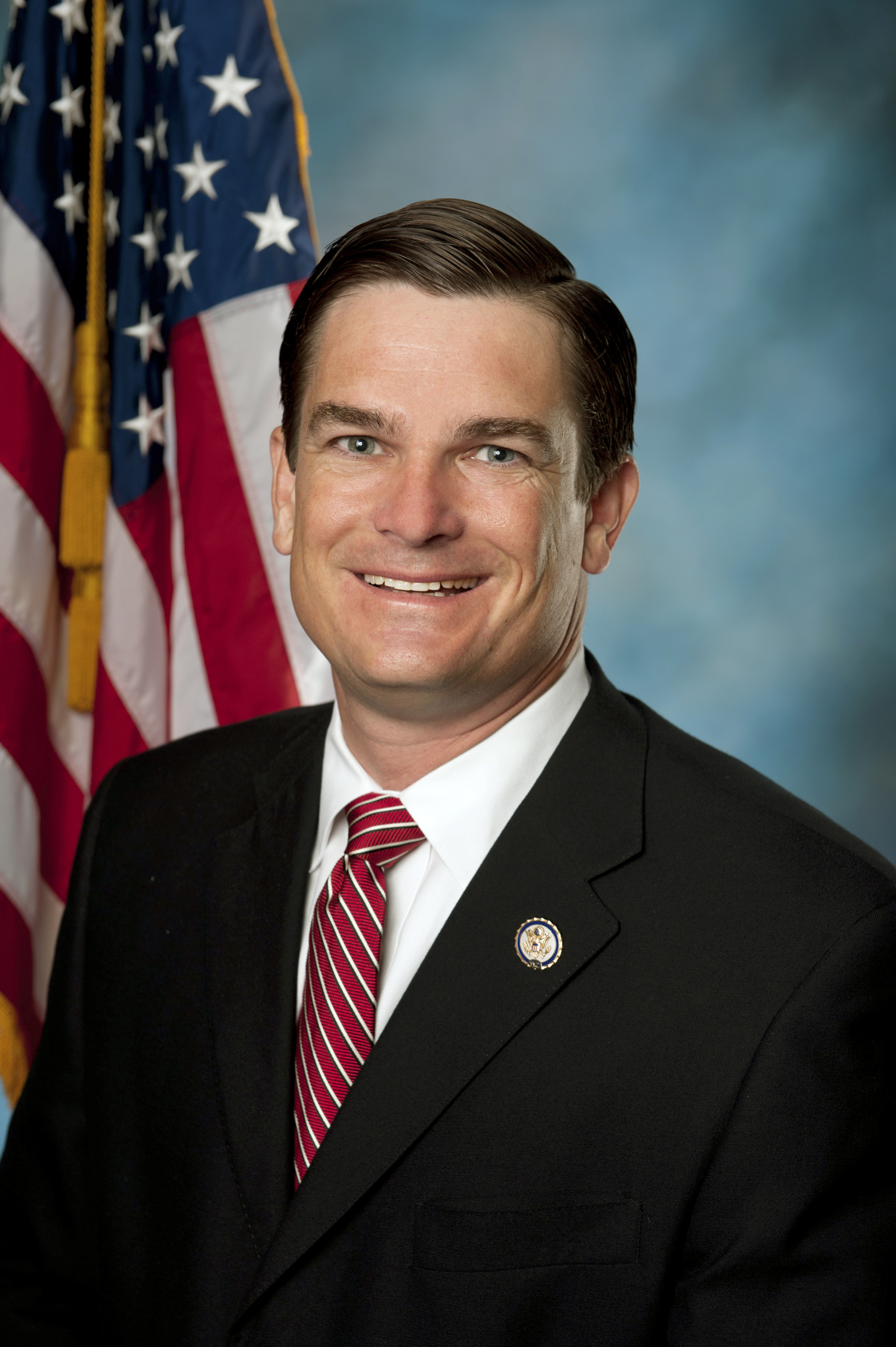
Scott's portrait from the 112th Congress

Scott was selected by his colleagues as freshman class president for the 112th Congress.

==== National security and defense ====
Scott's district is home to two United States Air Force bases: Moody Air Force Base and Robins Air Force Base. As a senior member of the House Armed Services Committee, Scott supports pro-military and defense spending policies. He is also a proponent of the United States Navy hospital ships.

Scott was very vocal on the United States Air Force's decision not to replace the Northrop Grumman E-8 Joint STARS, which provide intelligence, surveillance, and reconnaissance capabilities. Many JSTARS are based at Robins Air Force Base in Warner Robins, Georgia. While Scott supports the forthcoming Advanced Battle Management System, or ABMS, he contends the Air Force should maintain the capabilities of the JSTARS until the new ABMS systems are in place. In 2018, the Air Force announced that Robins Air Force Base would host the initial elements of the Advanced Battle Management System, a capability which will fuse global air and space intelligence, surveillance, and reconnaissance information.

Scott opposed canceling the F-22.

As a member of the House Armed Services Committee, Scott works toward combating transnational criminal organizations and the international flow of drugs.

Scott served on the Conference Committees for the Fiscal Year 2018, Fiscal Year 2019, and Fiscal Year 2021 National Defense Authorization Acts.

For the 117th Congress, Scott is the only member from Georgia to serve on a Congressional defense committee.

==== Agriculture ====
Scott served on the Conference Committees for both the 2014 and 2018 Farm Bills.

Scott secured provisions in the 2018 Farm Bill to bring broadband investments to rural America.

In August 2020, U.S. trade representative Robert Lighthizer held two virtual hearings to examine foreign trade policies harming American growers of seasonal and perishable produce, including one with Georgia producers. These hearings were the result of years of requests by Scott and other members of Georgia's and Florida's Congressional delegations to examine the dumping of foreign-subsidized fresh fruits and vegetables into U.S. agricultural markets below the cost of production domestically.

Scott unsuccessfully ran against Representatives Rick Crawford and Glenn Thompson for Ranking Member of the House Agriculture Committee for the 117th Congress. Thompson, senior to Scott on the committee, was named Ranking Member by the House Republican Steering Committee in December 2020.

==== Legislation ====
On June 15, 2018, President Donald Trump signed into law the Veterans Cemetery Benefit Correction Act (Public Law No: 115-184), a bill authored by Scott and supported in the United States Senate by Johnny Isakson to require the Department of the Interior to provide outer burial receptacles for veterans' remains buried in a national cemetery administered by the National Park Service.

Scott and Representative Sanford Bishop brokered federal assistance for farmers affected by 2018 and 2019 natural disasters, including $3 billion in agricultural relief for damages from storms and reprogrammed unused funds to be used for future relief efforts. This was included in a disaster assistance package Trump signed into law in June 2019.

As a member of the Congressional Sportsmen's Caucus, Scott has sponsored and supported numerous sportsmen's and conservation bills. In the 115th Congress, he introduced legislation to modernize the Pittman–Robertson Federal Aid in Wildlife Restoration Act to allow state fish and wildlife agencies to use Pittman-Robertson funds for public relations and for constructing, operating, and maintaining public ranges, which passed the House during the 115th Congress.

On June 11, 2024, Scott voted (at 6:36 in video) against including H.R.1282 - MAJ Richard Star Act in the FY 25 NDAA. This despite the fact that he is listed as a co-sponsor of the bill.

=== Speakership election ===
Scott announced his bid for the October 2023 speakership election on October 13, facing Jim Jordan of Ohio. He was considered a close ally of House Majority Leader Steve Scalise who had previously run for the position but withdrew after failing to consolidate the necessary votes.

He was ultimately defeated, with Scott garnering 81 votes to Jordan's 124. He subsequently endorsed Jordan for the speakership.

On October 20, Scott announced a second bid seeking the Republican nomination following Jim Jordan's failure to be elected speaker after three ballots on the House floor and to secure the party's nomination a third time subsequently.

=== Current committee assignments ===
For the 119th Congress:

- Committee on Agriculture (Vice Chair)
  - Subcommittee on Commodity Markets, Digital Assets, and Rural Development
  - Subcommittee on General Farm Commodities, Risk Management, and Credit (Chairman)
  - Subcommittee on Nutrition and Foreign Agriculture
- Committee on Armed Services
  - Subcommittee on Intelligence and Special Operations
  - Subcommittee on Readiness
- Committee on Rules
  - Subcommittee on the Rules and Organization of the House
- Permanent Select Committee on Intelligence
  - Subcommittee on Central Intelligence Agency
  - Subcommittee on National Intelligence Enterprise (Chairman)
  - Subcommittee on National Security Agency and Cyber

=== Caucus memberships ===
- Republican Study Committee
- Congressional Sportsmen's Caucus (former co-chair and House vice chair)
- Congressional Cement Caucus
- United States Congressional International Conservation Caucus
- Congressional Caucus on Turkey and Turkish Americans
- Congressional Western Caucus

=== Other memberships ===
- NATO Parliamentary Assembly
- Board of Visitors, Western Hemisphere Institute for Security Cooperation

=== Stock trades ===
Scott has been a successful stock trader while serving in Congress. He bought 1,000 shares of Fuel Cell Energy, Inc. (FCEL) at $2 per share on October 30, 2020, and sold some shares on December 23, 2020, at $13.42 (a 571% increase), selling the remainder on January 14, 2021, at $17.60 (a 780% increase). The website Unusual Whales follows congressional stock trading and has created a page for Scott's trades.

In October 2021, Business Insider reported that Scott had violated the Stop Trading on Congressional Knowledge (STOCK) Act of 2012, a federal transparency and conflict-of-interest law, by failing to properly disclose up to $165,000 worth of stock trades made by his wife in AT&T, Berkshire Hathaway, Ford Motor Co., and Johnson & Johnson.

== Political positions ==
=== Abortion ===
Scott opposes abortion and believes that human life begins at conception.

=== Budget, taxes, and the economy ===
Scott supports a balanced budget amendment. He voted for the Tax Cuts and Jobs Act of 2017.

=== Cannabis ===
Scott has a "D" grade from marijuana legalization advocacy organization the National Organization for the Reform of Marijuana Laws (NORML) for his voting history regarding cannabis-related issues.

=== Capital punishment ===
Scott supports the death penalty.

=== LGBT issues ===
Scott opposes same-sex marriage.

=== Second Amendment ===
Scott opposes gun control.

=== Ukraine ===
Following the Russian invasion of Ukraine in 2022, Scott consistently supported military aid to Ukraine. As of October 2023, he received an "A" grade on the congressional report card on Ukraine support by Defending Democracy Together.

=== Women's issues ===
Scott voted for the Violence Against Women Reauthorization Act of 2012 and also for the 2013 Reauthorizes the Violence Against Women Act amendment, which failed in the house. Ultimately, he voted against the 2013 renewal of the Violence Against Women Act. He voted for the Deborah Sampson Act in 2019 which increased health care access for women veterans through the Department of Veterans Affairs.

=== Texas v. Pennsylvania ===
In December 2020, Scott was one of 126 Republican representatives to sign an amicus brief in support of Texas v. Pennsylvania, a lawsuit filed at the U.S. Supreme Court contesting the results of the 2020 presidential election, in which Joe Biden defeated incumbent Donald Trump. The U.S. Supreme Court declined to hear the case on the basis that Texas lacked standing under Article III of the Constitution to challenge the results of an election held by another state.

=== 2021 Electoral College vote ===
On January 7, 2021, Scott did not object to the Electoral College certification in the House of Representatives. On January 5, 2021, he joined several Republican colleagues in sending a letter to Congressional leadership stating that members of Congress did not have the authority to object to Electoral College votes sent to them by each state absent an investigation from a state legislature or a conflicting slate of electors.

Scott condemned the violence at the U.S. Capitol on January 6, 2021.

Scott attended President Joe Biden's inauguration on January 20, 2021.

=== Confederate names ===
On February 12, 2021, Scott was appointed to the congressionally mandated Commission on the Naming of Items of the Department of Defense that Commemorate the Confederate States of America or Any Person Who Served Voluntarily with the Confederate States of America.

=== Immigration ===
Scott sponsored H.R. 6202, the American Tech Workforce Act of 2021, introduced by Representative Jim Banks. The legislation would establish a wage floor for the high-skill H-1B visa program, thereby significantly reducing employer dependence on the program. The bill would also eliminate the Optional Practical Training program that allows foreign graduates to stay and work in the United States.

== Personal life ==
Austin and his wife Vivien reside in Tifton, Georgia, with their three children. The Scotts are members of the First Baptist Church of Tifton.

U.S. House of Representatives
Preceded by Jim Marshall	Member of the U.S. House of Representatives from Georgia's 8th congressional district 2011–present	Incumbent
U.S. order of precedence (ceremonial)
Preceded by David Schweikert	United States representatives by seniority 88th	Succeeded by Terri Sewell
