= Cori Bush =

American politician (born 1976)

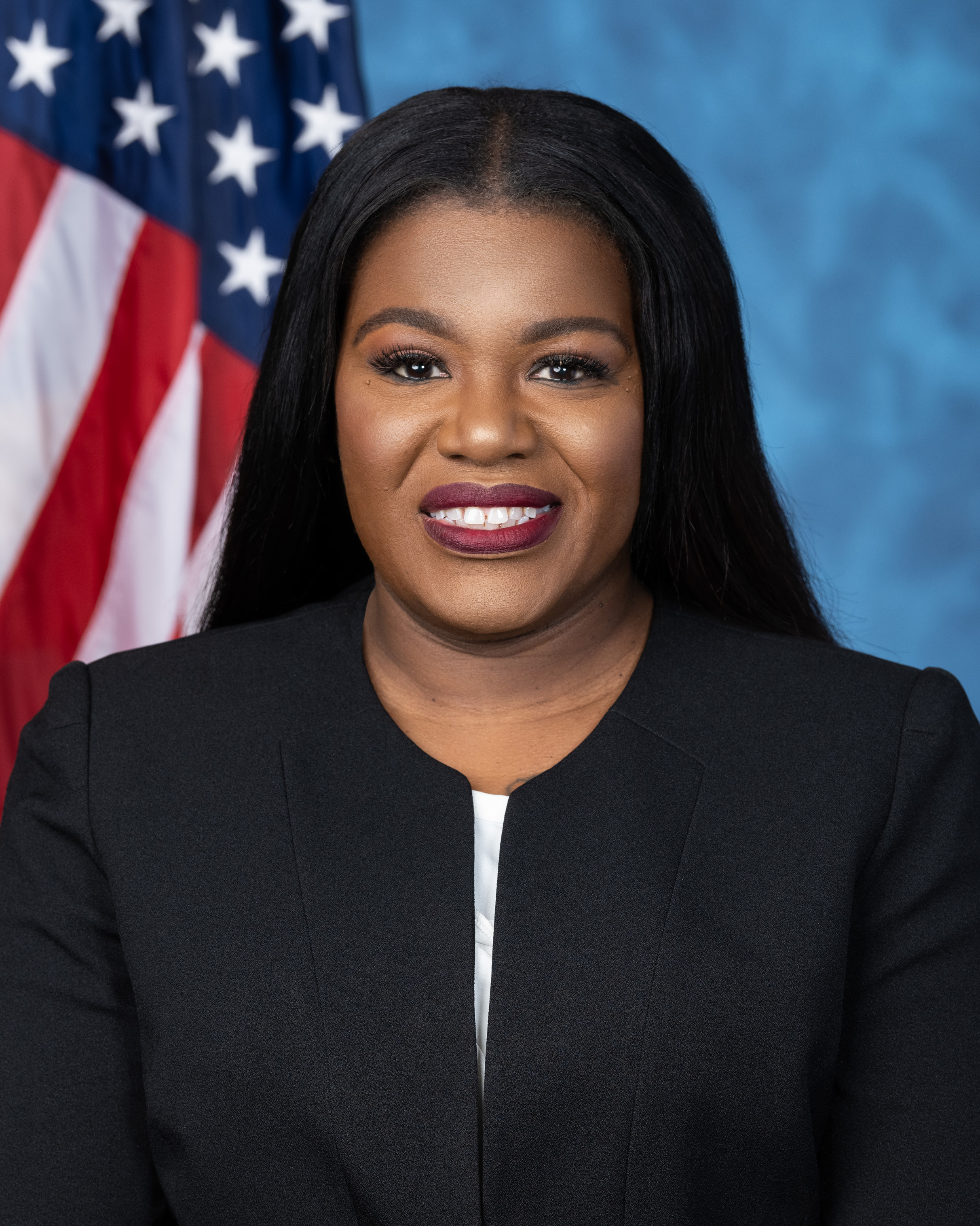
- Official portrait, 2020

Member of the U.S. House of Representatives from Missouri's 1st district
- In office January 3, 2021 – January 3, 2025
- Preceded by: Lacy Clay
- Succeeded by: Wesley Bell

Personal details
- Born: Cori Anika Bush; July 21, 1976 (age 50) St. Louis, Missouri, U.S.
- Party: Democratic
- Other political affiliations: Democratic Socialists of America
- Spouse: Cortney Merritts (m. 2023)
- Children: 2
- Education: Harris-Stowe State University (attended); Lutheran School of Nursing (DipN)
- Website: Campaign website
- Bush's voice Bush supporting the Equal Rights Amendment. Recorded March 27, 2023

Cori Anika Bush (born July 21, 1976) is an American politician, nurse, pastor, and Black Lives Matter activist who served as the U.S. representative for Missouri's 1st congressional district from 2021 to 2025. She is a member of the Democratic Party and the Democratic Socialists of America.

Bush was first elected to Congress in 2020 after defeating incumbent Lacy Clay in the Democratic primary. She previously ran against Clay for the seat in 2018. Her 2018 campaign was featured in the 2019 Netflix documentary film Knock Down the House. She is the first African-American woman to serve in the U.S. House of Representatives from Missouri. She was re-elected in 2022.

In 2024, Bush lost the Democratic primary to St. Louis County prosecuting attorney Wesley Bell. She ran again in 2026, losing to Bell in a primary rematch.

== Early life and education ==
Bush was born on July 21, 1976, in St. Louis and graduated from Cardinal Ritter College Prep High School in 1994. Her father, Errol Bush, is an alderman in Northwoods, Missouri, and previously served as mayor. In the summer of 1994, at 18 years old, Bush became pregnant after being raped and had an abortion. A year later, she had a second abortion when she was 19 years old.

Bush studied at Harris–Stowe State University for one year (1995–96) and worked at a preschool until 2001. She earned a Diploma in Nursing from the Lutheran School of Nursing in 2008.

== Early career ==
In 2011, Bush established the Kingdom Embassy International Church in St. Louis, Missouri, and served as its pastor until 2014. She became a political activist during the 2014 Ferguson unrest, during which she worked as a triage nurse and organizer, where she said that a police officer hit her. Bush is a Nonviolence 365 Ambassador with the King Center for Nonviolent Social Change.

Bush was a candidate for the 2016 United States Senate election in Missouri. In the Democratic primary, she placed a distant second to Secretary of State Jason Kander. Kander narrowly lost the election to incumbent Republican Roy Blunt.

== U.S. House of Representatives ==
=== Elections ===
==== 2018 ====
2018 Democratic primary results Clay: 50–60% Clay; 60–70% Clay

In 2018, Bush launched a primary campaign against incumbent Democratic representative Lacy Clay in Missouri's 1st congressional district. Described as an "insurgent" candidate, Bush was endorsed by Brand New Congress and Justice Democrats. Her campaign was featured in the Netflix documentary Knock Down the House, alongside those of Alexandria Ocasio-Cortez, Amy Vilela, and Paula Jean Swearengin. Clay defeated Bush 56.7% to 36.9%.

==== 2020 ====
2020 Democratic primary results Bush: 50–60%; Clay: 40–50%

In 2020, Bush ran against Clay again. She was endorsed by progressive organizations, including Justice Democrats, Sunrise Movement, and Brand New Congress, and she received personal endorsements from Vermont senator Bernie Sanders, NY-16 Democratic nominee Jamaal Bowman, former Ohio state senator Nina Turner, activist Angela Davis, and West Virginia Democratic Senate nominee Paula Jean Swearengin.

Bush narrowly defeated Clay in the primary election in what was widely seen as an upset. Bush received 48.5% of the vote, winning St. Louis City and narrowly losing suburban St. Louis County. Her primary victory was considered tantamount to election in the heavily Democratic district. Her primary win ended the Clay family's 52-year hold on the district. Clay's father, Bill, won the seat in 1968 and was succeeded by his son in 2000. The district and its predecessors have been in Democratic hands without interruption since 1911. No Republican has received more than 40% in the district since the late 1940s. With a Cook Partisan Voting Index of D+29, it is easily the most Democratic district in Missouri and tied for the 23rd-most Democratic district in the country.

As expected, Bush won the general election, defeating Republican Anthony Rogers with 78 percent of the vote.

==== 2022 ====
2022 Democratic primary results Bush: 60–70%; 70–80%

In 2022, Bush ran for reelection to the seat. She was challenged by Steve Roberts, state senator, who received support from previous representative Lacy Clay. Bush won the Democratic primary with almost 70% of the vote.

==== 2024 ====
2024 Democratic primary results by county Bell: 50–60%; Bush: 50–60%

2024 Democratic primary results by precinct Bush: 40–50%; 50–60%; 60–70%; 70–80%; 80–90%; 90–100%; Bell: 40–50%; 50–60%; 60–70%; 70–80%; 80–90%; 90–100%; 40–50% tie 50% tie No votes

In 2024, Bush ran for reelection to the seat. On August 6, 2024, Bush lost the Democratic primary to Wesley Bell, the prosecuting attorney of St. Louis County. The primary was the second most-expensive House primary in history, with $9 million in spending against Bush from United Democracy Project, AIPAC's super PAC. The organization targeted Bush after her criticism of Israel during the Gaza war. Bush was the second member of the Squad defeated in a Democratic primary in 2024 following George Latimer's defeat of Jamaal Bowman.

==== 2026 ====
In October 2025, Bush announced her candidacy to reclaim her former congressional seat in the 2026 midterm elections in a rematch against Wesley Bell. She lost by an even greater margin in the Democratic primary.

=== Tenure ===
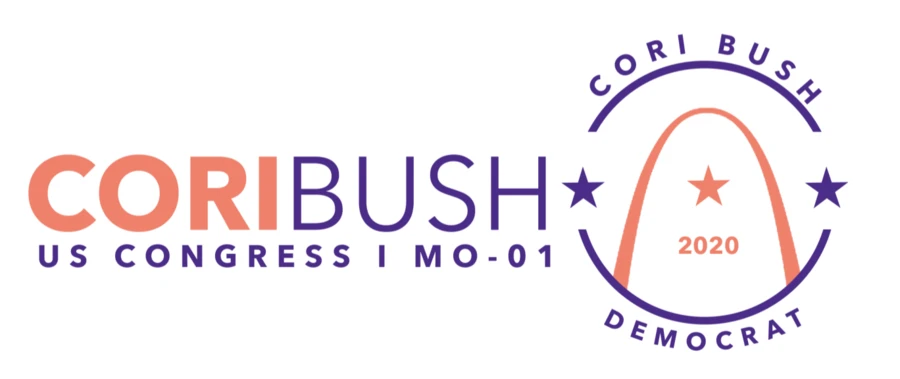
Logo for Bush's 2020 congressional campaign

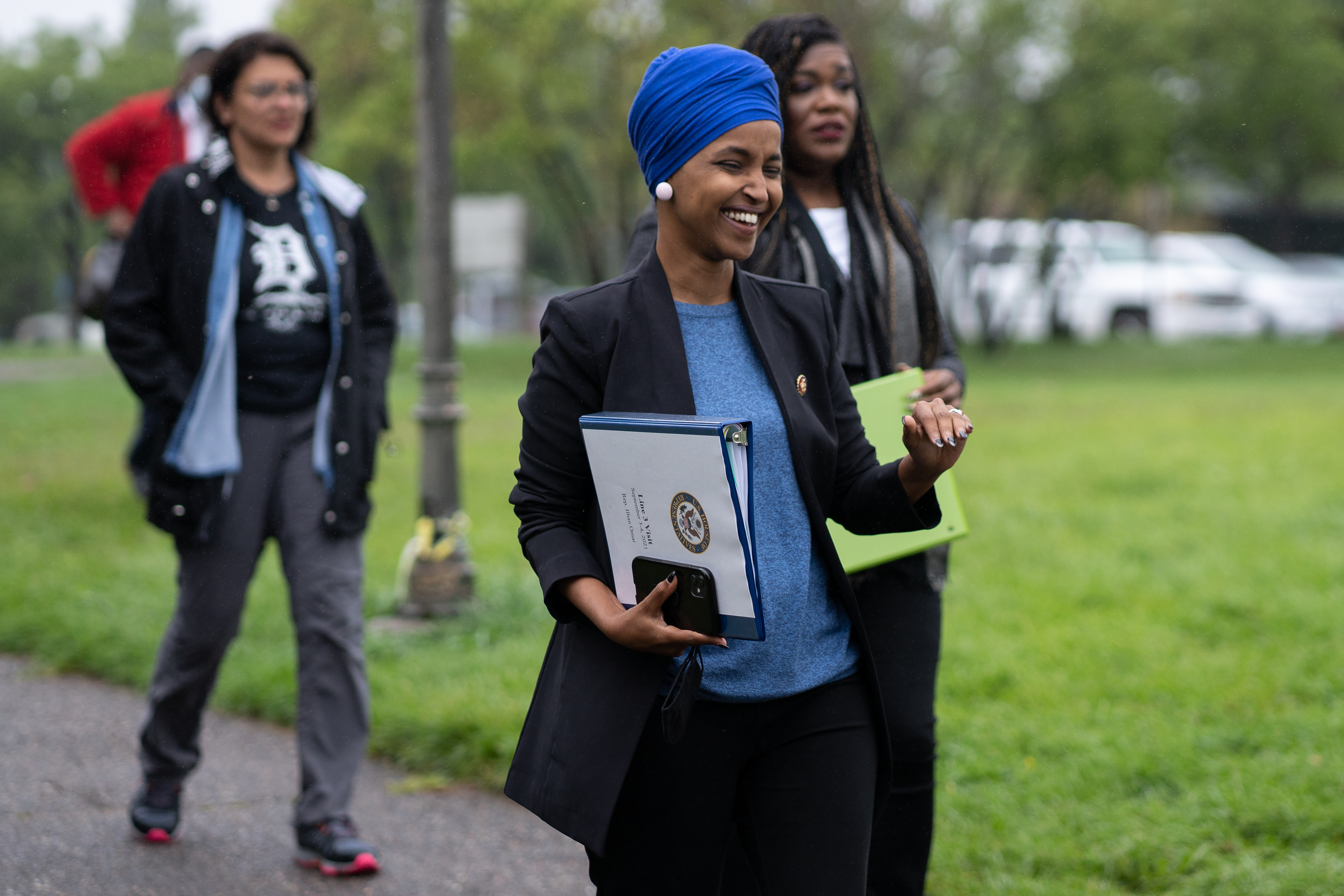
Cori Bush with Ilhan Omar and Rashida Tlaib on September 3, 2021

Soon after being sworn in, Bush was associated with "The Squad", an informal left-wing grouping in the Democratic caucus.

On January 6, 2021, hours after rioters stormed the U.S. Capitol in a failed bid to overturn Donald Trump's loss to Joe Biden in the 2020 election, Bush introduced a resolution to remove every Republican who supported attempts to overturn the 2020 United States presidential election from the House of Representatives. In her support for Trump's second impeachment, Bush called the attack on the Capitol a "white supremacist insurrection" incited by the "white supremacist-in-chief".

In August 2021, Bush took a leading role in fighting to extend the CARES Act's eviction moratorium, sleeping on the steps of the U.S. Capitol to make her point; the CDC extended the moratorium on August 3.

On August 5, 2021, Bush defended spending tens of thousands of dollars on personal security for herself as a member of Congress while also saying Democrats should defund the police, saying, "I get to be here to do the work, so suck it up—and defunding the police has to happen. We need to defund the police." Bush was investigated by the Department of Justice for illegally using campaign funds to pay for the private security. Bush claimed that there were "racist attempts made against my life". Bush was also investigated for using her Member Representaion Allowance money, a fund paid for with taxpayer money, for office expenses.Bush denied the charges., stating that she felt the charges came from her retention of her husband as paid personal security personnel and that she followed all applicable rules in retaining him. No criminal charges were ever levied against Bush. On November 5, 2021, Bush was one of six House Democrats to break with their party and vote with a majority of Republicans against the Infrastructure Investment and Jobs Act because it was not accompanied by the Build Back Better Act.

In 2022, Bush secured $750,000 in Community Project Funding for expansions to the Urban League facilities in North St. Louis, as well as funding for other area service organizations.

Bush was among the 46 Democrats who voted against final passage of the Fiscal Responsibility Act of 2023 in the House.

Following Bush's introduction of a Gaza ceasefire resolution in 2023, St. Louis County Prosecutor Wesley Bell announced his candidacy against her for the following election. Reports indicated that American Israel Public Affairs Committee (AIPAC) has marked her and other members of "the Squad" for "high dollar challengers." Co-founder for LinkedIn, billionaire Reid Hoffman, also expressed intentions to fund opponents of both Bush and Tlaib.

On January 30, 2024, Bush confirmed reports that she was under investigation by the U.S. Department of Justice and Federal Election Commission for alleged misuse of federal security money. Bush also claimed the Office of Congressional Ethics had previously investigated the same allegations and voted unanimously to dismiss the case after finding no evidence of wrongdoing.

For the 2024 fiscal year, Bush secured over $13 million in federal earmarks to fund projects in the St. Louis area, including emergency food and shelter services and redevelopment for a housing complex. Total federal funds to Missouri were reduced from previous cycles as neither Missouri senator requested funds.

==== Foreign and defense policy ====
In September 2021, Bush was one of eight Democrats to vote against the funding of Israel's Iron Dome missile defense system.

In March 2022, amidst Russia's invasion of Ukraine, Bush was one of two Democrats to vote against a bill to ban oil from Russia.

She condemned the October 7 attacks. On October 16, 2023, Bush introduced a resolution calling for a ceasefire in the Gaza war. She condemned Israel's bombing of the Gaza Strip that killed thousands of Palestinian civilians in Gaza.

==== Public transportation ====
Bush and congressional allies, including Senator Roy Blunt, successfully advocated for the Federal Transit Administration Climate Relief Fund. According to Bush, "that fund was going to have zero dollars in it" to repair damage to public transit systems from severe storms and flooding in 2017, 2020, 2021, and 2022. Bush threatened to withhold her vote for the budget if FTA funds were not included.

=== Committee assignments ===
For the 118th Congress:

- Committee on Oversight and Accountability
  - Subcommittee on Economic Growth, Energy Policy, and Regulatory Affairs (Ranking Member)
  - Subcommittee on National Security, the Border, and Foreign Affairs
- Committee on the Judiciary
  - Subcommittee on Crime and Federal Government Surveillance
  - Subcommittee on the Constitution and Limited Government

=== Caucus memberships ===
- Congressional Black Caucus
- Congressional Caucus for the Equal Rights Amendment (Bush co-chairs it with Ayanna Pressley)
- Congressional Progressive Caucus
- Medicare for All Caucus

== Political positions ==
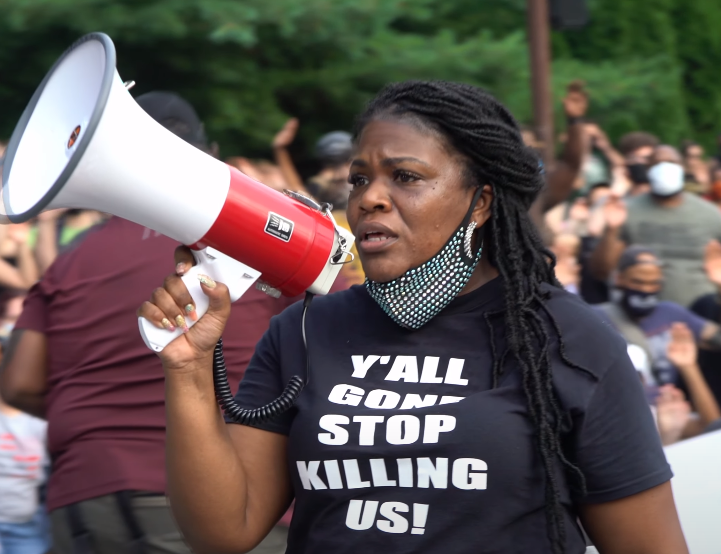
Bush during the George Floyd protests in July 2020

Bush is a progressive Democrat, supporting policies such as defunding the police; criminal justice and police reform; abortion rights; Medicare for All; a $15 minimum wage; tuition-free state college and trade school; and canceling student debt. She was endorsed by, and is a member of, the Democratic Socialists of America. Bush supports the Boycott, Divestment and Sanctions (BDS) movement and has called Israel an "apartheid state". She stands "unwaveringly with Black Lives Matter's demands".

Bush advocated defunding the United States Armed Forces during her campaign. After receiving criticism from California Representative Kevin McCarthy and a St. Louis Post-Dispatch editorial, Bush clarified that she supported reallocating defense funding to healthcare and low-income communities.

After supporters of then-president Donald Trump stormed the United States Capitol on January 6, 2021, Bush introduced a resolution to investigate and expel members of the House who promoted the conspiracy theory that the 2020 presidential election was stolen from Trump. On January 29, after House Speaker Nancy Pelosi accepted her request, Bush changed offices from the Longworth House Office Building after Congresswoman Marjorie Taylor Greene "berated" her and her staff in a hallway and refused to wear a mask. Greene accused Bush of calling for violence against a couple involved in the controversial July 2020 march through a gated St. Louis street.

On March 9, 2022, during Russia's invasion of Ukraine, she was one of two Democrats to vote against a bill that would ban oil from Russia, stating that the bill "fails to address the underlying problem". She emphasized that she backed "sanctions that target the murderous Putin regime, Russian oligarchs, and corporate fossil fuel executives profiting off human suffering".

On July 18, 2023, she was one of nine progressive Democrats to vote against a congressional non-binding resolution proposed by August Pfluger, which states that "the State of Israel is not a racist or apartheid state", that Congress rejects "all forms of antisemitism and xenophobia" and that "the United States will always be a staunch partner and supporter of Israel." Bush introduced the Ceasefire Now Resolution in Congress on October 16, 2023, with that measure calling for a ceasefire as well as increased humanitarian aid during the Gaza war.

== Personal life ==
Bush lives in St. Louis, Missouri. She has two children and has been married twice. In 2001, Bush, her husband at the time, and young children lived in their Ford Explorer for about three months after being evicted from a rental home. At the time, Bush had lost income because illness during her second pregnancy made it necessary for her to quit her job at a preschool.

In February 2023, Bush married Cortney Merritts, a security specialist and U.S. Army veteran. Bush's husband was charged with two counts of wire fraud for allegedly accepting $20,000 in payments from the COVID era Paycheck Protection Program, falsifying details about his purported businesses to obtain loans from the Small Business Administration in both 2020 and 2021. In February 2026, a federal judge in Washington, D.C., dismissed a fraud indictment against Merritts after a jury failed to reach a verdict in the case the previous month.

In May 2021, Bush testified to the House Oversight and Reform Committee that during her first pregnancy, she informed her doctor of severe pain but was ignored, and as a result, went into pre-term labor. She attributed this to "harsh and racist treatment" that Black women face during pregnancy and childbirth. In a subsequent tweet, she wrote, "Every day, Black birthing people and our babies die because our doctors don't believe our pain."

=== Healing claim ===
In a 2022 interview with the PBS news program The Firing Line with Margaret Hoover, Bush recounted a story from her biography about healing a homeless woman with tumors. She stated, "This lady came to us and she had these tumors. She wanted us to feel them" adding that as soon as she touched them, "The lumps that were there were no longer there and she was so happy and she went on about her day". When asked for her response to people who might not believe her story, Bush explained "they are not the woman that had the tumors".

== Autobiography ==
- The Forerunner: A Story of Pain and Perseverance in America (2022), Knopf First Edition 978-0593320587.

== Electoral history ==
=== 2016 ===
2016 United States Senate election in Missouri Democratic primary
Party	Candidate	Votes	%
Democratic	Jason Kander	223,492	69.9
Democratic	Cori Bush	42,453	13.3
Democratic	Chief Wana Dubie	30,432	9.5
Democratic	Robert Mack	23,509	7.4
Total votes		319,886	100.00%

=== 2018 ===
Missouri 1st Congressional District Democratic Primary, 2018
Party	Candidate	Votes	%
Democratic	Lacy Clay (incumbent)	81,426	56.7
Democratic	Cori Bush	53,056	36.9
Democratic	Joshua Shipp	4,959	3.5
Democratic	DeMarco K. Davidson	4,229	2.9
Total votes		143,670	100.0

=== 2020 ===
Missouri 1st Congressional District Democratic Primary, 2020
Party	Candidate	Votes	%
Democratic	Cori Bush	73,274	48.5
Democratic	Lacy Clay (incumbent)	68,887	45.6
Democratic	Katherine Bruckner	8,850	5.9
Total votes		151,011	100.0

Missouri's 1st Congressional District General Election, 2020
Party	Candidate	Votes	%
Democratic	Cori Bush	249,087	78.7
Republican	Anthony Rogers	59,940	18.9
Libertarian	Alex Furman	6,766	2.1
Write-in		378	0.1
Total votes		316,171	100.0

=== 2022 ===
Missouri 1st Congressional District Democratic Primary, 2022
Party	Candidate	Votes	%
Democratic	Cori Bush (incumbent)	65,326	69.5
Democratic	Steve Roberts	25,015	26.6
Democratic	Michael Daniels	1,683	1.8
Democratic	Ron Harshaw	1,065	1.1
Democratic	Earl Childress	929	1.0
Total votes		94,018	100.0

Missouri's 1st Congressional District General Election, 2022
Party	Candidate	Votes	%
Democratic	Cori Bush (incumbent)	160,999	72.86
Republican	Andrew Jones	53,767	24.33
Libertarian	George A. Zsidisin	6,192	2.80
Total votes		220,958	100.00

=== 2024 ===
Missouri 1st Congressional District Democratic Primary, 2024
Party	Candidate	Votes	%
Democratic	Wesley Bell	63,521	51.12
Democratic	Cori Bush (incumbent)	56,723	45.65
Democratic	Maria Chappelle-Nadal	3,279	2.64
Democratic	Ron Harshaw	735	0.59
Total votes		124,258	100.00

=== 2026 ===
Missouri 1st Congressional District Democratic Primary, 2026
Party	Candidate	Votes	%
Democratic	Wesley Bell (incumbent)	83,853	59.17
Democratic	Cori Bush	52,299	36.91
Democratic	Alissa Murphy	3,261	2.30
Democratic	Carl E. Harris Sr.	1,570	1.11
Democratic	Carl Earnest Henderson	728	0.51
Total votes		141,711	100.00

== See also ==
- Black women in American politics
- Legacy of Black Lives Matter
- List of African-American United States representatives
- List of African-American United States Senate candidates
- Women in the United States House of Representatives

U.S. House of Representatives
Preceded by Lacy Clay	Member of the U.S. House of Representatives from Missouri's 1st congressional district 2021–2025	Succeeded by Wesley Bell
U.S. order of precedence (ceremonial)
Preceded by Bruce Poliquin as Former U.S. Representative	Order of precedence of the United States as Former U.S. Representative	Succeeded by Tim Griffin as Former U.S. Representative
