= Salmonellosis in the United States =

Salmonellosis annually causes, per CDC estimation, about 1.2 million illnesses, 23,000 hospitalizations, and 450 deaths in the United States every year.

The shell of the egg may be contaminated with Salmonella by feces or environment, or its interior (yolk) may be contaminated by penetration of the bacteria through the porous shell or from a hen whose infected ovaries contaminate the egg during egg formation.

Salmonella is found in 8% of the chicken parts tested by the USDA and 25% of ground chicken. Antibiotic resistance has developed in some strains of salmonella.

== Regulation ==
The United States has struggled to control salmonella infections, with the rate of infection rising from 2001 to 2011. The FDA and the USDA have separate jurisdiction over products which may be contaminated with salmonella, but the rules defining which agency inspects what is complex and difficult to summarize; for example, the FDA inspects shelled eggs while the USDA oversees egg products.

In 1998, the USDA moved to close plants if salmonella was found in excess of 20 percent, which was the industry’s average at the time, for three consecutive tests. Texas-based Supreme Beef Processors, Inc. sued on the argument that Salmonella is naturally occurring and ultimately prevailed when a federal appeals court affirmed a lower court. These issues were highlighted in a proposed Kevin's Law (formally proposed as the Meat and Poultry Pathogen Reduction and Enforcement Act of 2003), of which components were included the Food Safety Modernization Act passed in 2011, but that law applies only to the FDA and not the USDA. The USDA proposed a regulatory initiative in 2011 to Office of Management and Budget.

In 2012, the USDA proposed to increase the line speed and reduce the number of inspectors of chickens.

=== Hazard Analysis and Critical Control Point (HACCP) rules ===
In 1996, the USDA Food Safety and Inspection Service finalized rules which required slaughter and processing plants to adopt Hazard Analysis and Critical Control Point rules, which included performance standards for acceptable percentage testing positive of salmonella. These included 20% for broilers (chickens), 8.7% for swine, and 7.5% for ground beef. In 2011, updated performance standards went into effect, reducing the salmonella prevalence to 7.5%; however, meeting these standards was not strictly required for operation. Plants not meeting the requirement were publicized online. The agency originally began publishing the names of problem plants in 2008.

=== Industry commentary ===
In a 2013 fact sheet, the National Chicken Council observed that although salmonella on raw chicken has significantly declined, salmonellosis has not significantly declined, suggesting that salmonellosis infections have another cause.

== Epidemiology ==
In 2010, an analysis of death certificates in the United States identified a total of 1,316 Salmonella-related deaths from 1990 to 2006. These were predominantly among older adults and those who were immunocompromised.

=== Before 2006 ===
The U.S. government reported as many as 20% of all chickens were contaminated with Salmonella in the late 1990s, and 16.3% were contaminated in 2005. In the mid- to late 20th century, Salmonella enterica serovar Enteritidis was a common contaminant of eggs. This is much less common now with the advent of hygiene measures in egg production, and the vaccination of laying hens to prevent Salmonella colonization. Various Salmonella serovars (strains) also cause severe diseases in animals.

=== 2007 ===
In February 2007, the U.S. Food and Drug Administration issued a warning to consumers not to eat certain jars of Peter Pan or Great Value peanut butter, due to risk of contamination with Salmonella tennessee.

=== 2008 ===
From April 10, 2008 to July 8, 2008, the rare Saintpaul serotype of S. enteritidis caused at least 1017 cases of salmonellosis in 41 states throughout the United States, the District of Columbia, and Canada. As of July 2008, the U.S. FDA suspected the contaminated food product was a common ingredient in fresh salsa, such as raw tomato, fresh jalapeño pepper, fresh serrano pepper, and fresh cilantro. It is the largest reported salmonellosis outbreak in the United States since 1985. New Mexico and Texas have been proportionally the hardest hit by far, with 49.7 and 16.1 reported cases per million, respectively. The greatest number of reported cases have occurred in Texas (384), New Mexico (98), Illinois (100), and Arizona (49). At least 203 reported hospitalizations have been linked to the outbreak, it has caused at least one death, and it may have been a contributing factor in at least one additional death. The CDC maintains "it is likely many more illnesses have occurred than those reported." If applying a previous CDC-estimated ratio of unreported salmonellosis cases to reported cases (38.6:1), an estimated 40,273 illnesses occurred from this outbreak.

As of 18 July 2008, the FDA removed raw tomatoes and cilantro as potential carriers; however, fresh jalapeño and serrano peppers still remain.

In December 2008 and January 2009, several Midwestern states, including Ohio (officially confirmed by state authorities), reported an outbreak of salmonellosis from Salmonella typhimurium that had sickened at least 50 people, due to contaminated dairy products such as cheeses.

=== 2009 ===
On January 17, 2009, the FDA announced they had traced the source of an outbreak of Salmonella typhimurium to a plant in Blakely, Georgia, owned by Peanut Corporation of America (PCA), and urged people to postpone eating commercially prepared or manufactured peanut butter-containing products and institutionally served peanut butter. Salmonella was reported to be found in 46 states in the United States in at least 3,862 peanut butter-based products, such as crackers, energy bars, and peanut butter cookies from at least 343 food companies. Dog treats were affected, as well. At least 691 people in more than 46 states became sick, and the Salmonella claimed at least 9 lives as of March 25.

Peanut butter and peanut paste manufactured by PCA were distributed to hundreds of firms for use as an ingredient in thousands of different products, such as cookies, crackers, cereal, candy, and ice cream, all of which were recalled. Some products were also sold directly to consumers in retail outlets, such as dollar stores.

On March 14, 2009, expressing his own personal concern for the safety of his children who enjoy peanut butter, President Obama announced the establishment of the Food Safety Working Group, "an inter-agency effort to help overhaul the oversight system." The announcement came days after the FDA, also responding, released its first "guidance" on dealing with Salmonella contamination.

=== 2012 ===
An outbreak of salmonellosis caused by a rarer subspecies, Salmonella bareilly, was reported in multiple US states primarily on the East Coast. No deaths were reported, but many episodes of sickness and some hospitalizations were linked to the consumption of raw scraped ground tuna product.

=== 2024 ===
An outbreak of salmonellosis in nine states due to recalled eggs, with 65 people hospitalized, has been reported.
