= Bass Anglers for Saltwater Conservation =

Advocacy group

Bass Anglers for Saltwater Conservation, also known as Bass for Salt or BASC, is an advocacy group and internet activism tool that was launched by the Yamaha Motor Company and the Bass Anglers Sportsman Society on June 1, 2015. The organization primarily functions as a website, found at BassforSalt.com, and Online community for recreational anglers who want to be involved in fisheries policy. Bass Anglers for Saltwater Conservation provides recreational anglers with pre-written letters and talking points for contacting the United States Congress and other federal and state legislators about issues that affect recreational anglers. The group works in partnership with many prominent boating, sport fishing, and conservation organizations such as the Congressional Sportsmen's Foundation, the Coastal Conservation Association, and the Theodore Roosevelt Conservation Partnership. They also work with industry trade associations such as the National Marine Manufacturers Association and the American Sportfishing Association. On their website, the organization lists access, conservation, economics, and safety as their top issues.

Yamaha marked the co-launch of the organization and website a success, claiming 6,000 anglers used the group's online advocacy system to contact Congress within the first month. Bass Anglers for Saltwater Conservation have marketed themselves, in part, by using wrap advertising on large saltwater boats.

In partnership with Yamaha, Bass Anglers for Saltwater Conservation launched an Ethical code for recreational anglers in September 2016. In 2016, the National Professional Anglers Association claimed that the 2016 version of the Water Resources Development Act was passed out of the United States House of Representatives "in large part" because of letters sent through Bass Anglers for Saltwater Conservation's website.
