= Reinvesting in Shoreline Economies and Ecosystems Act =

Proposed US energy legislation

RISEE Act of 2023
- Other short titles: Reinvesting In Shoreline Economies and Ecosystems Act of 2023
- Long title: A bill to modify the disposition of certain outer Continental Shelf revenues and to open Federal financial sharing to heighten opportunities for renewable energy, and for other purposes.
- Acronyms (colloquial): RISEE
- Announced in: the 118th United States Congress

Legislative history
- Introduced in the United States Senate as S. 373 by Bill Cassidy (R‑LA) and Sheldon Whitehouse (D‑RI) on February 9, 2023; Committee consideration by United States Senate Committee on Energy and Natural Resources

RISEE Act of 2023
- Other short titles: Reinvesting In Shoreline Economies and Ecosystems Act of 2023
- Long title: A bill to modify the disposition of certain outer Continental Shelf revenues and to open Federal financial sharing to heighten opportunities for renewable energy, and for other purposes.
- Acronyms (colloquial): RISEE
- Announced in: the 118th United States Congress

Legislative history
- Introduced in the United States House as H.R. 913 by Randy Weber (R‑TX 14th), Lizzie Fletcher (D‑TX 07th), Nancy Mace (R‑SC 01st), Abigail Spanberger (D‑VA 07th), Don Davis (D‑NC 01st), and Anna Eshoo (D‑CA 16th) on February 9, 2023; Committee consideration by United States House Natural Resources Subcommittee on Energy and Mineral Resources, United States House Committee on Science, Space, and Technology

The Reinvesting In Shoreline Economies and Ecosystems (RISEE) Act of 2023, S. 373, is a bill in the United States Senate to share more federal revenue with states by amending the Gulf of Mexico Energy Security Act (GOMESA) and to dedicate revenue from offshore wind power in federal waters to state funds for coastal protection and restoration.

The Act would send 37.5% of federal revenue from offshore wind leases and production to states within 75 miles of the offshore wind farms, incentivizing state and local governments to speed permitting and otherwise support wind development.

== History ==
=== Background ===
As oil and gas resources close to shore declined, drilling moved further offshore, into federal waters. Until the 2006 passage of the Gulf of Mexico Energy Security Act, with its revenue-sharing framework, Louisiana and other Gulf Coast states received none of the revenue in spite of local impacts from the industrial activity. Louisiana's received $155.7 million in 2020 under GOMESA, but the states' share is capped at $375 million, a limit to be removed by RISEE. Revenue sharing would also be expanded to 38 coastal and Great Lakes states. The federal government received $4.37 billion in December 2022 from the sale of six wind leases offshore from New York and New Jersey; under RISEE, 37.5%, or $1.64 billion would have been shared with the states.

=== Introduction ===
The RISEE Act had been previously introduced in the 117th United States Congress. It was advanced by the Senate Committee on Energy and Natural Resources in July 2022. In December 2022, Cassidy and Senator John N. Kennedy (R‑LA) attempted but failed to attach RISEE to the year-end government spending package needed to avert a government shutdown.

=== Reintroduction ===
The Act was introduced by Senators Bill Cassidy (R‑LA) and Sheldon Whitehouse (D‑RI) and Representatives Randy Weber (R‑TX 14th), Lizzie Fletcher (D‑TX 07th), Nancy Mace (R‑SC 01st), Abigail Spanberger (D‑VA 07th), Don Davis (D‑NC 01st), and Anna Eshoo (D‑CA 16th) in February 2023.

Cassidy and Whitehouse courted House Speaker Mike Johnson and Majority Leader Steve Scalise, both Republicans from Louisiana, in March 2024 during an attempt to overcome opposition within the Democratic party. Cassidy and Whitehouse planned to add the bill as an amendment to the Energy Permitting Reform Act of 2024 during markup in July 2024 but decided to advance the bill in a later markup due to committee leadership deciding to avoid any amendment that could affect spending levels. The bill would need a cost estimate from the Congressional Budget Office.

In September 2024, Whitehouse filed the Act as an amendment to the defense authorization bill.

The Committee on Energy and Natural Resources voted to advance the RISEE Act in November 2024. The Act would include a cost to the federal government, due to which Cassidy was considering a number of pay-fors to pair with the Act, working with Whitehouse and Senate leadership to find a route to passage. Cassidy suggested that he could attach RISEE to the must-pass spending bill.

President-elect Trump, set to take office in 2025, pledged in May 2024 to stop offshore wind projects immediately upon assuming office, making prospects for the wind industry uncertain overall.

== Reception ==
The bill received support from the American Association of Port Authorities, a trade association, as the construction of offshore wind would bring business to ports. Some members of Congress oppose diverting federal revenue to the states, while coastal states stand to benefit. Louisiana would receive more than $100 billion annually from offshore energy for coastal restoration, and states such as Rhode Island, lacking offshore oil and gas fields and therefore not receiving fossil fuel subsidies, would begin to benefit from the revenues of wind power that can be developed off their shores. Senator George Helmy (D‑NJ) co-sponsored the bill in September 2024, bringing the total to 26 Senate cosponsors. As of December 2024, the House bill had 46 cosponsors.

In December 2022, 9 governors and 24 environmental organizations and trade groups had expressed support for RISEE.

Citizens for Responsible Energy Solutions, the Coastal Conservation Association, the Environmental Defense Fund, and the National Ocean Industries Association published statements in support of the bill.

== Policy provisions ==
The Act would send 37.5% of revenue from offshore wind leases and production outside state waters (6 nautical miles) to states within 75 miles of the offshore wind farms, incentivizing state and local governments to speed permitting and any other necessaries for wind development. (Law currently requires all such revenue to be retained in the U.S. Treasury.) The revenue would be directed toward funds for several purposes:

- "conservation, coastal restoration, hurricane protection, and infrastructure directly affected by coastal wetland losses"
- "Mitigation of damage to fish, wildlife, or natural resources, including through fisheries science and research."
- "Implementation of a federally approved marine, coastal, or comprehensive conservation management plan."
- "Mitigation of the impact of outer Continental Shelf activities through the funding of onshore infrastructure projects"

Furthermore, 12.5% of offshore wind revenue would be dedicated to the National Oceans and Coastal Security Fund, which is administered by the National Oceanic and Atmospheric Administration and National Fish and Wildlife Foundation for infrastructure and ecosystem projects mitigating extreme weather impacts increasing due to climate change. The fund gives money to states to grant for work regarding coastal erosion and sea level rise, coastal habitat restoration, and infrastructure improvements.

The Act also amends the Gulf of Mexico Energy Security Act (GOMESA) by eliminating the cap on energy royalties sent to (shared with) Alabama, Louisiana, Mississippi, and Texas and eliminating the state-side funding cap on the Land and Water Conservation Fund.
