= Randy Weber =

American politician (born 1953)

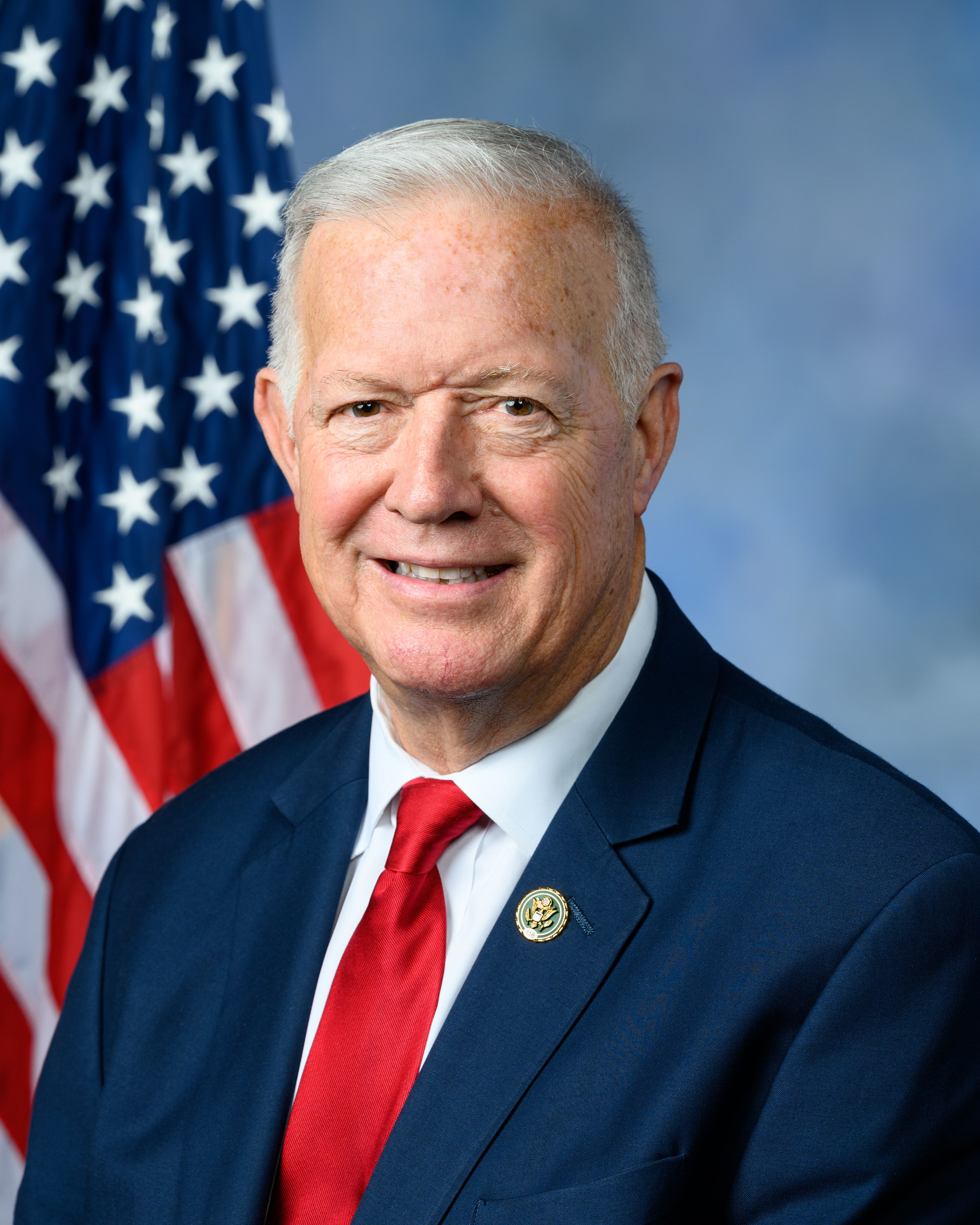
- Official portrait, 2022

Member of the U.S. House of Representatives from Texas's 14th district
- Incumbent
- Assumed office January 3, 2013
- Preceded by: Ron Paul

Member of the Texas House of Representatives from the 29th district
- In office January 3, 2009 – January 3, 2013
- Preceded by: Mike O'Day
- Succeeded by: Ed Thompson

Personal details
- Born: Randall Keith Weber; July 2, 1953 (age 73) Pearland, Texas, U.S.
- Party: Republican
- Spouse: Brenda Weber
- Children: 3
- Education: Alvin Community College (attended); University of Houston, Clear Lake (BS)
- Website: House website Campaign website

Randall Keith Weber (born July 2, 1953) is an American businessman and politician who has represented Texas's 14th congressional district in the United States House of Representatives since 2013. He was previously a member of the Texas House of Representatives, representing the 29th district. He is a member of the Republican Party.

In 2024, Weber was, according to GovTrack, “the most conservative member of the House of Representatives” during the 118th Congress.

== Early life, education, and business career ==
Weber graduated from Alvin Community College and in 1977 earned a Bachelor of Science in public affairs from the University of Houston–Clear Lake. In 1981, he founded Weber's Air & Heat Air-Conditioning Company.

== Early political career ==
Weber was a city councilman of Pearland, Texas, for six years. He also served as a Brazoria County grand jury commissioner, a Brazoria County Redistricting Committee member, a Texas Republican Party Convention delegate, president of Brazoria County Cities Association, a Brazoria County Republican Party member, and chair of the Pearland Area Republican Party Headquarters.

== Texas House of Representatives ==
=== Elections ===
After state representative Glenda Dawson died on September 12, 2006, a special election was held on December 19. Businessman Mike P. O'Day earned 48% of the vote, falling just short of the 50% threshold. Weber earned 28% of the vote, qualifying for the runoff. In the January runoff, O'Day defeated him 57%–43%.

After O'Day retired, Weber ran for the March 2008 primary and won with 59% of the vote. He won the general election with 60% of the vote. He was reelected in 2010 with 85% of the vote.

=== Committee assignments ===
- Border & Intergovernmental Affairs Committee (vice chair)
- Public Education Committee
- Republican Study Committee

== U.S. House of Representatives ==
=== Elections ===
==== 2012 ====
After U.S. representative Ron Paul of Texas's 14th congressional district decided to retire, nine Republicans ran in the newly redrawn district. Paul and Governor Rick Perry endorsed Weber. He ranked first with 28% of the vote. In the runoff, he defeated Pearland city councilwoman Felicia Harris, 62%–37%. He faced former Congressman Nick Lampson in the general election; Lampson jumped into the race after the 14th had been redrawn to include much of the territory he had represented in Congress from 1997 to 2005. In the November 6 general election, Weber defeated Lampson, 53% to 45%. Based upon Weber's vote total, Larry Sabato's Crystal Ball named Weber one of its "Underachievers" because he received only 54% of the vote in his district while Mitt Romney received 59%.

==== 2016 ====
Weber was reelected on November 8, 2016. He polled 160,631 votes (61.9%) to Democratic nominee Michael Cole's 99,054 (38.1%).

=== Tenure ===
In January 2014, during President Obama's State of the Union address, Weber in a tweet called Obama "Kommandant-In-Chef" [sic] and "the Socialist dictator." After the White House apologized for failing to send a higher-profile leader to a demonstration in Paris after the January 2015 terrorist attacks in that city, Weber tweeted, "Even Adolph [sic] Hitler thought it more important than Obama to get to Paris." Weber then wrote that he needed to "apologize to all those offended by my tweet". He did not delete his tweet made during the State of the Union address.

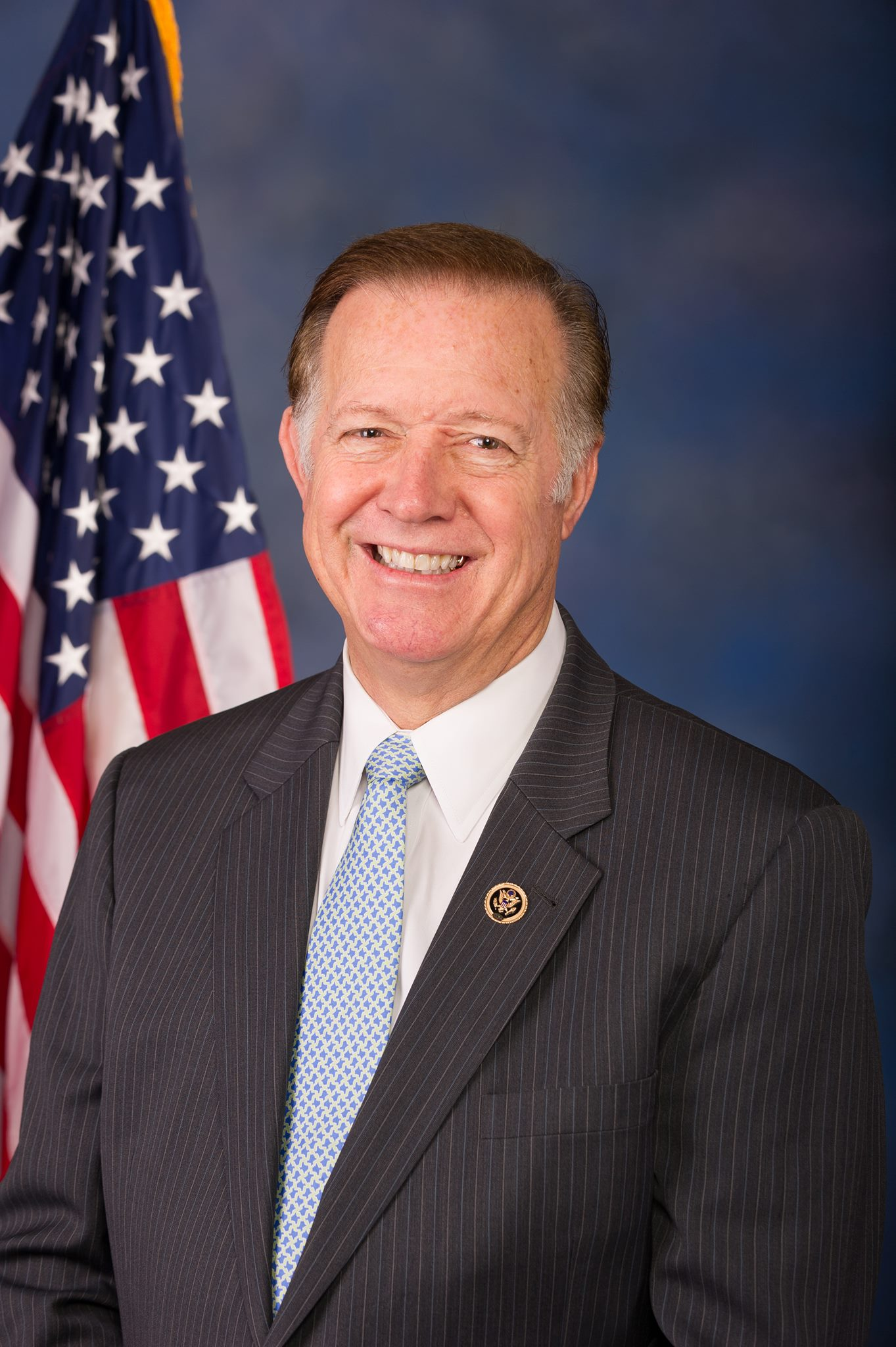
Weber during the 114th United States Congress (2015)

In 2015, Weber cosponsored a resolution to amend the Constitution to ban same-sex marriage. Weber also cosponsored a resolution disagreeing with the Supreme Court decision in Obergefell v. Hodges, which held that same-sex marriage bans violated the constitution.

In April 2015, Weber met with Aleksandr Torshin, the alleged handler for Russian spy Maria Butina, according to internal documents from Center for the National Interest.

The American Conservative Union gave him a 92% evaluation, Americans for Prosperity gave him a 94% evaluation, Campaign for Working Families, Concerned Women for America, and Faith and Freedom Coalition each gave him 100% evaluations, Conservative Review gave him a 73% evaluation, Eagle Forum gave him an 80% evaluation, National Journal gave him an 89% evaluation, and the John Birch Society gave him a 67% evaluation.

In December 2020, Weber was one of 126 Republican members of the House of Representatives to sign an amicus brief in support of Texas v. Pennsylvania, a lawsuit filed at the United States Supreme Court contesting the results of the 2020 presidential election, in which Joe Biden defeated incumbent Donald Trump. The Supreme Court declined to hear the case on the basis that Texas lacked standing under Article III of the Constitution to challenge the results of an election held by another state.

House speaker Nancy Pelosi issued a statement that called signing the amicus brief an act of "election subversion." She also reprimanded Weber and the other House members who supported the lawsuit: "The 126 Republican Members that signed onto this lawsuit brought dishonor to the House. Instead of upholding their oath to support and defend the Constitution, they chose to subvert the Constitution and undermine public trust in our sacred democratic institutions."

Weber was a supporter of efforts to impeach President Biden. In September 2021, Weber submitted a resolution to impeach Biden "for perpetuating a perception that Afghan security forces were winning the war against the Taliban." That same month, he also co-sponsored a resolution by Bob Gibbs to impeach Biden. In August 2021, Weber co-sponsored a resolution to impeach Alejandro Mayorkas, Biden's Secretary of Homeland Security.

In February 2023, Weber, along with representatives Lizzie Fletcher (D‑TX 07th), Nancy Mace (R‑SC 01st), Abigail Spanberger (D‑VA 07th), Don Davis (D‑NC 01st), and Anna Eshoo (D‑CA 16th), introduced the Reinvesting in Shoreline Economies and Ecosystems Act, which aims to share federal offshore wind power revenue with states for coastal protection and restoration work. The bill was also introduced in the Senate.

In the 118th Congress he co-sponsored a pair of resolutions meant to expunge the impeachments of Donald Trump. In the 119th United States Congress, he again co-sponsored resolutions to expunge Trump's impeachments.

Weber cosponsored legislation in 2025 which would eliminate birthright citizenship for the children of undocumented immigrants.

In May 2025, Weber joked to Jody Hice on the show "Washington Watch" that undocumented immigrants should be punished by being dropped out of airplanes.

=== Committee assignments ===
For the 119th Congress:

- Committee on Energy and Commerce
  - Subcommittee on Energy (Vice Chair)
  - Subcommittee on Environment
  - Subcommittee on Oversight and Investigations
- Committee on Science, Space, and Technology
  - Subcommittee on Energy (Chairman)

=== Caucus memberships ===
- House Baltic Caucus
- U.S.-Japan Caucus
- Republican Study Committee
- Congressional Caucus on Turkey and Turkish Americans

== Personal life ==
Weber has been married to Brenda Weber, a Pearland schoolteacher, for over 30 years. They have three children and eight grandchildren. He lives in Alvin, Texas. Weber is a Baptist.

U.S. House of Representatives
Preceded by Ron Paul	Member of the U.S. House of Representatives from Texas's 14th congressional district 2013–present	Incumbent
U.S. order of precedence (ceremonial)
Preceded by Ann Wagner	United States representatives by seniority 119th	Succeeded by Roger Williams
