= Ceasefire Now Resolution =

2023 proposed US House of Representatives resolution

H.Res. 786
- Long title: Calling for an immediate deescalation and cease-fire in Israel and occupied Palestine.
- Nicknames: Ceasefire Now Resolution
- Number of co-sponsors: 17

Legislative history
- Introduced in the House of Representatives by Cori Bush (D–MO) on October 16, 2023; Committee consideration by House Foreign Affairs

H. Res. 786, also known as the Ceasefire Now Resolution, was a proposed resolution in the United States House of Representatives. The resolution was introduced by Cori Bush (D-MO) in the 118th Congress in October 2023.

The resolution calls the killing of civilians a violation of international law, cites the deaths of Israelis, Palestinians, and Americans and the potential for more deaths as reason for a ceasefire in the Gaza war, and calls for the sending of humanitarian aid to Gaza.

== Response ==
=== Politicians ===
The resolution received support from 17 Democratic representatives and no Republican support. President Biden initially rejected calls for a ceasefire, saying, "As long as Hamas clings to its ideology of destruction, a cease-fire is not peace." Biden instead called for "humanitarian pauses." Eventually he called for temporary ceasefires in February 2024, and then an end to the war by May 2024.

=== Public ===
As of November 30, 2023, 65% of Americans supported a ceasefire according to a YouGov poll. "Ceasefire now" has become a slogan during American pro-Palestine protests.

=== Local governments ===
As of March 2024, over 100 American localities had passed resolutions calling for a ceasefire in the war, many of which were modeled on the Ceasefire Now resolution.

== See also ==
- Calls for a ceasefire during the Gaza war
- Gaza war protests in the United States
- Israel–United States relations
