= Congressional Caucus on Turkey and Turkish Americans =

Caucus in the United States congress

The Congressional Caucus on Turkey and Turkish Americans (Turkey Caucus) was established by US Congressmen Robert Wexler (D-Florida), Ed Whitfield (R-Kentucky) and Kay Granger (R-Texas) in March 2001.

The Turkey Caucus is a bi-partisan platform for members of the Caucus to focus on US–Turkey relations and issues that concern Turkish Americans. Many of its members have joined this caucus due to the efforts of their Turkish American constituents and friends of Turkey.

== Members ==
The Caucus has 80 members as of the 118th Congress: .

- 34 Democrats
- 45 Republicans

Congressional Caucus on Turkey and Turkish Americans in the 118th United States Congress

=== Co-chairs ===
- Steve Cohen (D‑TN‑9)
- Gerry Connolly (D‑VA‑11)
- Joe Wilson (R‑SC‑2)
- Amata Coleman Radewagen (R‑AS‑AL)

=== Senators ===
- John Boozman (R-AR)
- Lindsey Graham (R-SC)
- Chris Murphy (D-CT)
- Roger Wicker (R-MS)

=== Representatives ===
- Alma Adams (D‑NC‑12)
- Robert Aderholt (R‑AL‑4)
- Mark Amodei (R‑NV‑2)
- Don Bacon (R‑NE‑2)
- Don Beyer (D‑VA‑8)
- Jack Bergman (R‑MI‑1)
- Brendan Boyle (D‑PA‑13)
- Larry Bucshon (R‑IN‑8) (Retired from Congress)
- André Carson (D‑IN‑7)
- Yvette Clarke (D‑NY‑11)
- Tom Cole (R‑OK‑4)
- James Comer (R‑KY‑1)
- Henry Cuellar (D‑TX‑28)
- John Culberson (R‑TX‑7)
- Danny K. Davis (D‑IL‑7)
- Suzan DelBene (D‑WA‑1)
- Lloyd Doggett (D‑TX‑25)
- Jeff Duncan (R‑SC‑3)
- Tom Emmer (R‑MN‑6)
- Jake Ellzey (R‑TX‑10)
- Brian Fitzpatrick (R‑PA‑1)
- Virginia Foxx (R‑NC‑5)
- Lance Gooden (R‑TX‑5)
- Garret Graves (R‑LA‑6)
- Morgan Griffith (R‑VA‑9)
- Paul Gosar (R‑AZ‑1)
- Kay Granger (R‑TX‑12)
- Brett Guthrie (R‑KY‑12)
- Andy Harris (R‑MD‑1)
- Brian Higgins (D‑NY‑27) (Resigned from Congress)
- French Hill (R‑AR‑2)
- Jim Himes (D‑CT‑4)
- Richard Hudson (R‑NC‑8)
- Sheila Jackson Lee (D‑TX‑18) (Died July 19th, 2024)
- Hakeem Jeffries (D‑NY‑8)
- Bill Johnson (R‑OH‑6)
- Hank Johnson (D‑GA‑4)
- Ann McLane Kuster (D‑NH‑2)
- Bob Latta (R‑OH‑5)
- Nancy Mace (R‑SC‑1)
- Michael McCaul (R‑TX‑10)
- Betty McCollum (D‑MN‑4)
- Gregory Meeks (D‑NY‑6)
- Alex Mooney (R‑WV‑2)
- Dan Newhouse (R‑WA‑4)
- Eleanor H. Norton (D‑WV‑2)
- Bill Pascrell (D‑NJ‑9) (Died August 21, 2024)
- Scott Perry (R‑PA‑4)
- Stacey Plaskett (D‑VI‑AL)
- Mike Quigley (D‑IL‑5)
- Jamie Raskin (D‑MD‑8)
- Guy Reschenthaler (R‑PA‑14)
- David Rouzer (R‑NC‑7)
- Dutch Ruppersberger (D‑MD‑2)
- Gregorio Sablan (D‑MP‑AL) (Retired from Congress)
- Steve Scalise (R‑LA‑4)
- Austin Scott (R‑GA‑8)
- David Scott (D‑GA‑13) (Died April 22nd, 2026)
- Pete Sessions (R‑TX‑32)
- Mike Simpson (R‑ID‑2)
- Adam Smith (D‑WA‑9)
- Darren Soto (D‑FL‑9)
- Claudia Tenney (R‑NY‑24)
- Bennie Thompson (D‑MS‑2)
- Glenn Thompson (R‑PA‑5)
- Paul Tonko (R‑PA‑14)
- Michael Turner (R‑OH‑10)
- Juan Vargas (D‑CA‑51)
- Marc Veasey (D‑TX‑33)
- Randy Weber (R‑TX‑14)
- Frederica Wilson (D‑FL‑24)
- Rob Wittman (R‑VA‑1)
- Steve Womack (R‑AR‑3)
