= Lizzie Fletcher =

American politician (born 1975)

- Official portrait, 2024

Member of the U.S. House of Representatives from Texas's 7th district
- Incumbent
- Assumed office January 3, 2019
- Preceded by: John Culberson

Personal details
- Born: Elizabeth Ann Pannill; February 13, 1975 (age 51) Houston, Texas, U.S.
- Party: Democratic
- Spouse: Scott Fletcher (m. 2007)
- Relatives: Katherine Center (sister)
- Education: Kenyon College (BA); College of William and Mary (JD)
- Website: House website Campaign website
- Fletcher's voice Fletcher honoring the death of Sarah Weddington, counsel during Roe v. Wade. Recorded March 29, 2022

Elizabeth Ann Fletcher (née Pannill; born February 13, 1975) is an American attorney and politician from Texas. A member of the Democratic Party, she has represented Texas's 7th congressional district in the United States House of Representatives since 2019. The district, which was once represented by former President George H. W. Bush, includes parts of southwestern Houston and Harris County, as well as northern portions of Fort Bend County.

== Early life and education ==
Fletcher was born Elizabeth Ann Pannill at Hermann Hospital in Houston on February 13, 1975. She grew up in the River Oaks neighborhood of Houston and graduated from St. John's School.

Fletcher left Texas to attend Kenyon College in Ohio, where she earned Phi Beta Kappa honors, and attended William & Mary Law School in Virginia.

She returned to Houston, where she worked for the law firm Vinson & Elkins, where she met her husband, Scott. Later, she worked at Ahmad, Zavitsanos, Anaipakos, Alavi & Mensing and became the firm's first female law partner.

== U.S. House of Representatives ==
=== Elections ===
==== 2018 ====
Fletcher defeated Laura Moser in the Democratic Party primary election after a primary and runoff election that sharply divided Democrats between Fletcher (backed by the Democratic Congressional Campaign Committee) and Moser (backed by Our Revolution).

In the November 6 general election, Fletcher campaigned as a moderate against nine-term Republican incumbent John Culberson, defeating him by five percentage points (52.5% to 47.5%). Culberson carried his longstanding base of west Houston, parts of which he had represented for three decades at the state and federal levels, and the Memorial area, but could not overcome Fletcher's strong performance in the district's share of southwest Houston and the Bear Creek area. The 7th had historically been one of the most, if not the most, conservative districts in Houston and in Texas; underscoring this, Fletcher was only the third Democrat to win as much as 40 percent of the vote since the district was created in 1967.

Upon her swearing-in on January 3, 2019, Fletcher became the first Democrat and woman to represent the district.

==== 2020 ====
Fletcher was reelected with 50.8% of the vote to Republican nominee Wesley Hunt's 47.5%. Despite winning by a smaller margin than 2018, she held down-ballot drop-off voting to less than 4% from top-ballot candidate Joe Biden, who carried the district with 54% of the vote.

==== 2022 ====
Fletcher was reelected with 63.7% of the vote to Republican nominee Johnny Teague's 36.21%. She benefited from the 2020 congressional redistricting that shifted her district from a margin of 8.5 percentage points for Democrats to a 30-point margin. Most of the more Republican parts of the old 7th were shifted to the new 38th district, which was won by Hunt.

==== 2024 ====
Fletcher was re-elected with 61.3% of the vote.

==== 2026 ====
Fletcher was re-elected in 2026 with 70.8% of the vote, defeating Republican Alexander Hale.

=== Tenure ===
As of August 2023, Fletcher had voted in line with Joe Biden's stated position 99% of the time.

In 2022, Fletcher was one of 16 Democrats to vote against the Merger Filing Fee Modernization Act of 2022, an antitrust package that would crack down on corporations for anti-competitive behavior.

In February 2023, Fletcher, along with Representatives Randy Weber (R‑TX 14th), Nancy Mace (R‑SC 1st), Abigail Spanberger (D‑VA 7th), Don Davis (D‑NC 1st), and Anna Eshoo (D‑CA 16th), introduced the Reinvesting in Shoreline Economies and Ecosystems Act, which aims to share federal offshore wind power revenue with states for coastal protection and restoration work. The bill was also introduced in the Senate.

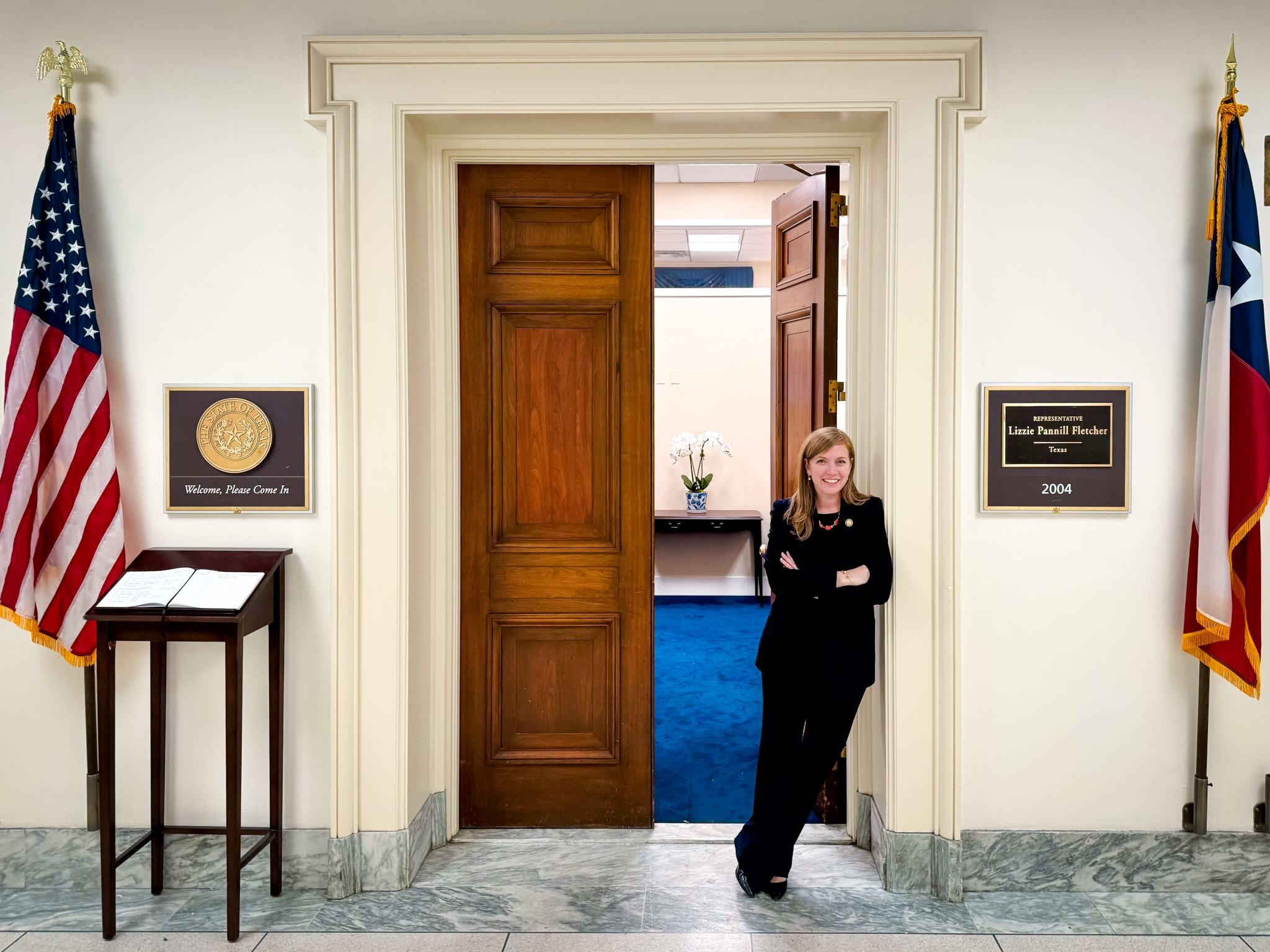
Fletcher in front of her office for the 119th Congress

In 2025, Fletcher's office was moved to the Rayburn House Office Building.

In February 2026, Fletcher was the only Democrat in the House to vote against the 21st Century ROAD to Housing Act.

=== Committee assignments ===
- Committee on Energy and Commerce
  - Subcommittee on Communications and Technology
  - Subcommittee on Energy, Climate, and Grid Security

=== Caucus memberships ===
- New Democrat Coalition
  - Task Force on Trade (co-chair)
  - Health Care Task Force
- Natural Gas Caucus (co-chair)
- Anti-Semitism Caucus
- Congressional Asian Pacific American Caucus
- Black Maternal Health Caucus
- Diabetes Caucus
- Congressional LGBT Equality Caucus
- Future Forum
- Gun Violence Prevention Task Force
- National Corrosion Caucus
- Oil and Gas Caucus
- Pro-Choice Caucus
- Small Brewers Caucus
- Congressional Sportsmen's Foundation
- Rare Disease Caucus
- Congressional Freethought Caucus
- U.S.-Japan Caucus

== Electoral history ==
Democratic primary results, 2018
Party	Candidate	Votes	%
Democratic	Lizzie Fletcher	9,731	29.3
Democratic	Laura Moser	8,077	24.4
Democratic	Jason Westin	6,364	19.2
Democratic	Alex Triantaphyllis	5,219	15.7
Democratic	Ivan Sanchez	1,890	5.7
Democratic	Joshua Butler	1,245	3.7
Democratic	James Cargas	650	2.0
Total votes		33,176	100.0

Democratic primary runoff results, 2018
Party	Candidate	Votes	%
Democratic	Lizzie Fletcher	11,423	67.1
Democratic	Laura Moser	5,605	32.9
Total votes		17,028	100.0

Texas's 7th congressional district, 2018
Party	Candidate	Votes	%
Democratic	Lizzie Fletcher	127,959	52.5
Republican	John Culberson (incumbent)	115,642	47.5
Total votes		243,601	100.0
Democratic gain from Republican			

Texas's 7th congressional district, 2020
Party	Candidate	Votes	%
Democratic	Lizzie Fletcher (incumbent)	159,529	50.8
Republican	Wesley Hunt	149,054	47.4
Libertarian	Shawn Kelly	5,542	1.8
Total votes		314,125	100.0
Democratic hold			

Texas's 7th congressional district, 2022
Party	Candidate	Votes	%
Democratic	Lizzie Fletcher (incumbent)	115,994	63.8
Republican	Johnny Teague	65,835	36.2
Total votes		181,829	100.0
Democratic hold			

Texas's 7th congressional district, 2024
Party	Candidate	Votes	%
Democratic	Lizzie Fletcher (incumbent)	149,820	61.3
Republican	Caroline Kane	94,651	38.7
Total votes		244,471	100.0
Democratic hold			

== Personal life ==
Fletcher is the sister of Katherine Center. Fletcher met her husband, Scott, at the law firm where they both worked.

Fletcher is a Methodist.

== See also ==
- Women in the United States House of Representatives

U.S. House of Representatives
Preceded by John Culberson	Member of the U.S. House of Representatives from Texas's 7th congressional district 2019–present	Incumbent
U.S. order of precedence (ceremonial)
Preceded by Veronica Escobar	United States representatives by seniority 199th	Succeeded by Russ Fulcher
