= Kevin's Law =

Proposed food safety law in the United States

Kevin's Law (as referred to in Representative Anna Eshoo's introduction of the law in 2005 and in the 2008 documentary Food, Inc.; formally known as the Meat and Poultry Pathogen Reduction and Enforcement Act of 2003, H.R. 2203) was proposed legislation that would have given the United States Department of Agriculture the power to close down plants that produce contaminated meat.

Kevin's Law was nicknamed in memory of two-year-old Kevin Kowalcyk of Wisconsin, who died in 2001 after developing hemolytic-uremic syndrome due to eating a hamburger contaminated with E. coli O157:H7.

The bill was reintroduced by Rep. Anna G. Eshoo, D-Palo Alto, as H.R. 3160, in the 109th Congress. This bill never became law, as it was referred to committee but never reported on.

In 2011, President Barack Obama signed into law the FDA Food Safety Modernization Act (FSMA), introduced by Rep. Betty Sutton. The FSMA contains key elements of Kevin's Law.

Kevin's Law would strengthen the U.S. government's ability to prevent contaminated meat and poultry from entering the food supply by:

- Requiring the United States Department of Agriculture (USDA) to identify the pathogens that threaten human health (e.g., Salmonella, E. coli O157:H7, Listeria monocytogenes).
- Requiring the USDA to establish performance standards to reduce the presence of these pathogens in meat and poultry.
- Confirming that the USDA has the authority to enforce its own standards by shutting down plants that continually breach basic health standards. Courts have held that the USDA does not have this authority in the absence of explicit authorizing legislation.
