= Lutheran School of Nursing =

For-profit nursing school in Missouri

The Lutheran School of Nursing was a for-profit nursing school in St. Louis, Missouri. Based at the campus of the St. Alexius Hospital (later the South City Hospital), the school offered a 26-month graduate diploma program. The school was accredited by the Accreditation Commission for Education in Nursing. The school was founded in 1898.

A report conducted by the Missouri State Board of Nursing in September 2019 yielded financial concerns, faculty turnover, aging facilities, and low exam pass rates. In December 2019, the school ceased the admittance of new students. In 2020, the Missouri State Board of Nursing planned a preliminary hearing on whether or not to shut down the school, but the meeting was postponed. The school was purchased by SA Hospital Acquisition LLC out of the bankruptcy of St. Alexius Hospital in January 2021. The school later moved from the hospital to a nearby office building. On July 27, 2022, the school closed permanently. Student transcripts were made available to the Missouri Department of Higher Education and Workforce Development. In May 2024, the building that formerly housed the school was "cleared out and boarded up." It had been unoccupied since the school's closure.
