= Broadband Conduit Deployment Act =

The Broadband Conduit Deployment Act of 2009 (H.R. 2428), (also reintroduced in 112th / 2011 as (H.R. 1695) and 114th / 2015 as H.R. 3805) would require new federal road projects to include plastic conduits buried along the side of the roadway, and enough of them to "accommodate multiple broadband providers."

"According to industry experts, more than half of the cost of new broadband deployment is attributable to the expense of tearing up and repaving roads," said Rep. Eshoo. "By putting the broadband conduit in place while the ground beneath the roadways is exposed, we will enable any authorized communications provider to come in later and install fiber-optic cable at far less cost." The bill is supported by Google.
