= Tom Huening =

- Born: Thomas Richard Huening; January 5, 1942 (age 84); Chicago, Illinois, USA
- Occupations: author, politician, businessman

Thomas Richard Huening (born January 5, 1942) is an American author, politician, and businessman from San Mateo County, California, in the San Francisco Bay Area. In his public service role he authored California's anti-gerrymandering Proposition 119 on the June 1990 ballot, co-founded the Garfield Charter School, and authored San Mateo County ballot Measure K, which extended BART to the San Francisco Airport, as well as Measure A, the Countywide Transportation Expenditure Plan. His latest book, Thomas Jefferson's Bible: Religious Freedom in America (published February, 2024, Spiritual Choices Publishing - KDP) revisits Jefferson's cut-and-paste personal Bible and his call for the separation of church and state required to preserve our inalienable freedoms. Earlier Huening wrote The Quintessential Good Samaritan: The Authorized Biography of John Joseph Kelly, Champion of Social Justice (published February, 2022, Post Hill Press), the personal account of a spiritually progressive Christian focused on restorative justice. His first book "Spiritual Choices: Putting the HERE in Hereafter" is non-fiction prose dealing with the practice of world religions and the importance of daily action as well as belief.

== Family ==
Huening was born in Chicago, Illinois, the second of twelve children of Clarence Edward Huening and Hermina Ann Huening (née Huberts). With his first wife Kathleen Bernice Hynes he is the father of four daughters, who live in California and Texas. Huening and his wife Carol live in the San Francisco Bay Area.

== Education ==
- Bachelor of Arts degree in 1965 from DePaul University, Chicago, major in Speech, with a minor in Philosophy.
- Bachelor of Laws, La Salle Extension University, Chicago, 1974 passed the California Bar exam.
- MBA, 1982 Pepperdine University.
- passed California's Certified Public Accountant exam in 2003.

== Early career experience ==
- 1965-1970: jet fighter pilot in the US Navy, serving in Vietnam, and flying the F-8 Crusader, UC-45J Navigator, S-2 Tracker (co-pilot), A-7 Corsair, and A-4 Skyhawk.
- 1970-1987: commercial pilot for TWA, for which he flew as pilot/flight engineer the Convair 880, Boeing 707, and Boeing 727.
- 1970-1976: vice-president, Coldwell Banker Commercial Real Estate in San Jose, Sacramento, and San Francisco, California.

== San Mateo County public service ==
- elected trustee of San Mateo County Community College District in 1981, serving until 1986.
- elected to the San Mateo County Board of Supervisors, serving 1987 through 1998.
- elected in 1998 as the San Mateo County Controller; reelected in 2002, 2006, and 2010; retired mid-term from public service in 2012.

== Other public service ==
- in 1992 Huening was the Republican candidate for US Congress in California's 14th District. As part of his campaign, he organized the Omaha Summit, a post-election gathering of reform-minded freshman Representatives to the US House. Despite losing to Democrat Anna Eshoo, who held this seat until her retirement in 2025, he attended the event held in Omaha, Nebraska, on November 30, 1992.
- co-created and served on Board of Directors of Garfield Charter School (California charter school #49).

== Business experience ==
- 1977 to the present: runs Huening Investment Co., a commercial real estate re-development firm in the Bay Area

== Author ==
- Thomas Jefferson's Bible: Religious Freedom in America (published February, 2024, Spiritual Choices Publishing - KDP) revisits Jefferson's cut and paste personal Bible and his call for the separation of church and state required to preserve our inalienable freedoms.
- The Quintessential Good Samaritan: The Authorized Biography of John Joseph Kelly, Champion of Social Justice (publish date February, 2022, Post Hill Press), the personal account of a spiritually progressive Christian.
- Spiritual Choices (published 2006, reissued 2008 as Spiritual Choices: Putting the HERE in Hereafter), a nonfiction work examining what the world's major religions have to offer to the spiritually minded.
- editor of and contributor to "Unicorn: A Contemporary Journal", published by the College of San Mateo.
- regular contributor of political op-ed articles.
