= Municipal resolutions for a ceasefire in the Gaza war =

Numerous municipalities and other local bodies in the United States have passed resolutions urging a ceasefire in the Gaza war. Resolutions are generally modeled after the Ceasefire Now resolution, introduced in the US Congress by Cori Bush, which also called for release of the hostages. At least 20 cities condemned the October 7 attacks. Seventy cities had passed resolutions by the end of January 2024. As of March 2024, resolutions have passed in over 100 localities, including the major cities of Atlanta, Chicago, Dayton, Detroit, Minneapolis, Providence, Sacramento, Seattle, St. Paul, St. Louis, San Francisco, and Toledo.

Resolution proponents generally call for greater recognition of Palestinian rights, an immediate end to military hostilities, and the provision of humanitarian aid. The resolutions have been opposed by advocates for Israel who argue that a ceasefire would impede the Israeli military effort to defeat Hamas. In San Francisco, proponents included hundreds of Jews and Muslims opposed to the war. In March 2024, The Cincinnati City Council passed a resolution that called for "a six-week cease-fire, the release of vulnerable hostages, and the provision of unrestricted humanitarian aid."

== List of municipalities passing ceasefire resolutions ==
Date	State	Locality	Ref.
October 25, 2023	California	Richmond	
November 2, 2023	Rhode Island	Providence	
November 7, 2023	California	Cudahy	
November 14, 2023	North Carolina	Carrboro	
November 20, 2023	Ohio	Akron	
November 21, 2023	Michigan	Detroit	
November 21, 2023	Washington	Seattle	
November 27, 2023	California	Oakland	
December 4, 2023	California	Hollister	
December 11, 2023	Washington	Bellingham	
December 12, 2023	California	Folsom	
December 12, 2023	New Mexico	Taos	
December 18, 2023	Michigan	Kalamazoo	
December 19, 2023	California	Long Beach	
December 19, 2023	Michigan	Wayne County	
December 20, 2023	Ohio	Dayton	
December 20, 2023	Pennsylvania	State College	
January 2, 2024	Iowa	Iowa City	
January 2, 2024	Connecticut	Bridgeport	
January 3, 2024	Maine	Portland	
January 9, 2024	California	Cotati	
January 9, 2024	California	San Francisco	
January 11, 2024	Michigan	Ann Arbor	
January 16, 2024	Iowa	Coralville	
January 16, 2024	Minnesota	Hastings	
January 17, 2024	Michigan	Washtenaw County	
January 25, 2024	Massachusetts	Somerville	
January 20, 2024	Massachusetts	Cambridge	
January 22, 2024	New York	Newburgh	
January 22, 2024	Washington	Port Townsend	
January 24, 2024	California	Montebello	
January 31, 2024	Illinois	Chicago	
February 1, 2024	Iowa	Johnson County	
February 5, 2024	Connecticut	Windsor	
February 5, 2024	Ohio	Yellow Springs	
February 6, 2024	Massachusetts	Medford	
February 12, 2024	Michigan	Lansing	
February 13, 2024	Illinois	Bolingbrook	
February 13, 2024	Ohio	Toledo	
February 15, 2024	Colorado	Glenwood Springs	
February 19, 2024	Ohio	Athens	
February 26, 2024	California	Fort Bragg	
February 27, 2024	Virginia	Harrisonburg	
March 4, 2024	Massachusetts	Amherst	
March 4, 2024	New York	Beacon	
March 6, 2024	New Jersey	Wayne	
March 18, 2024	Massachusetts	Greenfield	
March 19, 2024	California	Sacramento	
March 24, 2024	California	Albany	
March 25, 2024	Ohio	Cleveland	
March 27, 2024	South Dakota	Oglala Sioux Tribe	
April 2, 2024	Virginia	Charlottesville	
April 3, 2024	Massachusetts	Easthampton	
April 8, 2024	Illinois	Burr Ridge	
April 15, 2024	Illinois	Batavia	
April 30, 2024	Washington	Tacoma	
May 1, 2024	Massachusetts	Boston	
May 8, 2024	Ohio	Chauncey	
May 8, 2024	New Mexico	Santa Fe	
May 28, 2024	Massachusetts	Charlemont	
May 28, 2024	Michigan	Hamtramck	
May 28, 2024	California	Pacifica	
June 4, 2024	California	Eureka	
June 11, 2024	South Dakota	Cheyenne River Sioux Tribe	
June 25, 2024	Massachusetts	Malden	
February 25, 2025	California	Grass Valley	
