= Congressional Sportsmen's Foundation =

US nonprofit organization

- Founded: 1989
- Key people: Jeff Crane, President
- Website: www.congressionalsportsmen.org

The Congressional Sportsmen's Foundation (CSF) is a 501(c)(3) nonprofit organization headquartered in Washington, DC. Established in 1989, CSF's mission is to "work with Congress, governors, and state legislatures to protect and advance hunting, angling, recreational shooting, and trapping". Initially, CSF provided a link of information and resources between the sportsmen's community and Members of the Congressional Sportsmen's Caucus (CSC), and since has extended its legislative network across the United States, managing a network of bipartisan state legislative sportsmen's caucuses organized under the banner of the National Assembly of Sportsmen's Caucuses (NASC) and the Governors Sportsmen's Caucus (GSC).

CSF is supported by its Mission Partners, a group of corporate, foundation, and organization partners, as well as an individual support program called the Sporting Society and currently manages three caucus programs: The Congressional Sportsmen's Caucus, the National Assembly of Sportsmen's Caucuses, and the Governors Sportsmen's Caucus.

== Congressional Sportsmen's Caucus (CSC) ==
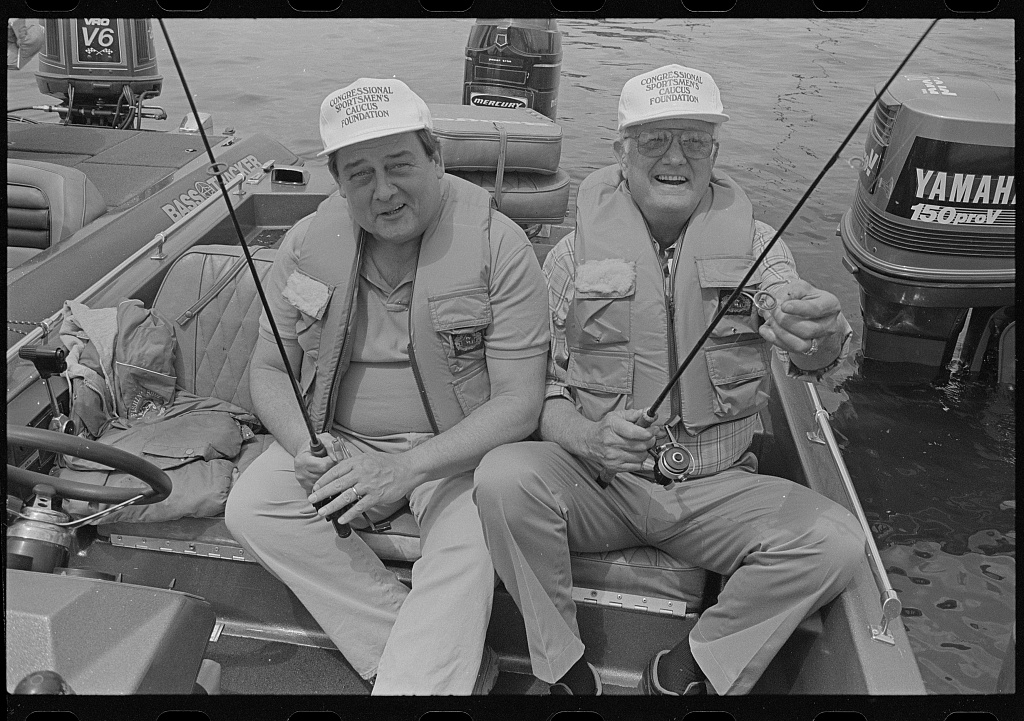

The Congressional Sportsmen's Caucus was established in 1989 by Richard Schulze (R-PA) and Lindsay Thomas (D-GA), among other Members of Congress. Today, the CSC is the largest bipartisan caucus in Congress, with 216 Members of Congress from the U.S. Senate and House of Representatives.

117th Congress Leadership

- Senate Co-Chairs: Senator Deb Fischer (R-NE), Senator Martin Heinrich (D-NM)
- Senate Vice-Chairs: Senator John Boozman (R-AR), Senator Joe Manchin (D-WV)
- House of Representatives Co-Chairs: Representative Debbie Dingell (D-MI), Representative Richard Hudson (R-NC)
- House of Representatives Vice-Chairs: Representative Bruce Westerman (R-AR), Representative Jimmy Panetta (D-CA)

Alumni Association In 2014, the CSC Alumni Association was established to link past Members of the CSC in an alumni network, with the goal to protect and advance hunting and angling after serving in Congress. The Alumni Association was founded by Co-Chairs Richard Schulze and Lindsay Thomas.

== National Assembly of Sportsmen's Caucuses (NASC) ==
The bipartisan National Assembly of Sportsmen's Caucuses was established in 2004 as an umbrella program of state legislative sportsmen's caucuses across the United States. As of 2019, NASC includes 49 legislative sportsmen's caucuses, including over 2,000 state legislators. NASC facilitates the interaction and idea exchange among state caucus leaders and the outdoor community.

The NASC program is guided by the Executive Council (EC), consisting of state sportsmen's caucus leaders who are committed to advancing NASC. EC members are elected by their sportsman-legislator colleagues to serve two year terms.

2019 NASC Executive Council

- Senator Bill Heath (GA) – President
- Representative Brian White (SC) – Vice President
- Representative Jeff Goley (NH) – Secretary
- Senator Mike Bell (TN)
- Senator Robin Webb (KY)
- Delegate Wendell Beitzel (MD)
- Representative Scott Bounds (MS)
- Representative Patrick Brennan (VT)
- Representative Regina Cobb (AZ)
- Representative Bill Rehm (NM)
- Representative Jeff Wardlaw (AR)
- Representative Brad Witt (OR)

== Governors Sportsmen's Caucus (GSC) ==
The Governors Sportsmen's Caucus (GSC) was established in 2009 to facilitate communication and information exchange between state executives in support of policies that protect and advance hunting, angling, recreational shooting and trapping.

2019 Leadership

- Co-Chairs: Governor Tom Wolf (PA), Governor Asa Hutchinson (AR)

== Board of directors ==
CSF is governed by a Board of Directors including leaders from the sportsmen's community and associated industry. Honorary Board Member*

- Richard Childress (Chairman), Richard Childress Racing
- Harlan Kent (Vice-Chair), Pure Fishing
- Francisco Bergaz (Secretary), Bekun LLC and Bervest LLC
- Ken Eubanks (Treasure), Rather Outdoors
- Pete Angle, Covey Partners
- Joe Bartozzi, National Shooting Sports Foundation
- Tuck Beckstoffer, Tuck Beckstoffer Wines
- Ralph Castner (Treasurer), Rush Creek Advisors, LLC
- Mark Cherpes, FN America
- Bruce Culpepper*
- James Cummins, Wildlife Mississippi
- Mark DeYoung*
- Tripper Dickson, Sports South
- Chris Dorsey*, Dorsey Pictures
- Evan Hafer, Black Rifle Coffee
- Peder von Harten, Nicholas Air
- Jason Hornady, Hornady Manufacturing Co.
- Becky Humphries, National Wild Turkey Federation
- Brandon Maddox, Silencer Central
- Corey Mason, Dallas Safari Club
- Walter McLallen*, Meritage Capital Advisors
- Paul Miller*, Adams Arms, LLC
- Bruce Pettet, Leupold & Stevens, Inc.
- Tim Phillips
- Adam Putman, Ducks Unlimited
- Vishak Sankaran, Vista Outdoors
- Steve Skold, Skold Companies
- Mark Smith, Smith & Wesson
- Bob Ziehmer, Bass Pro
