= 2022 United States House of Representatives elections =

House election for the 118th U.S. Congress

- November 8, 2022

All 435 seats in the United States House of Representatives (Note: Also included are five non-voting delegates.) 218 seats needed for a majority
- Turnout: 45.1%
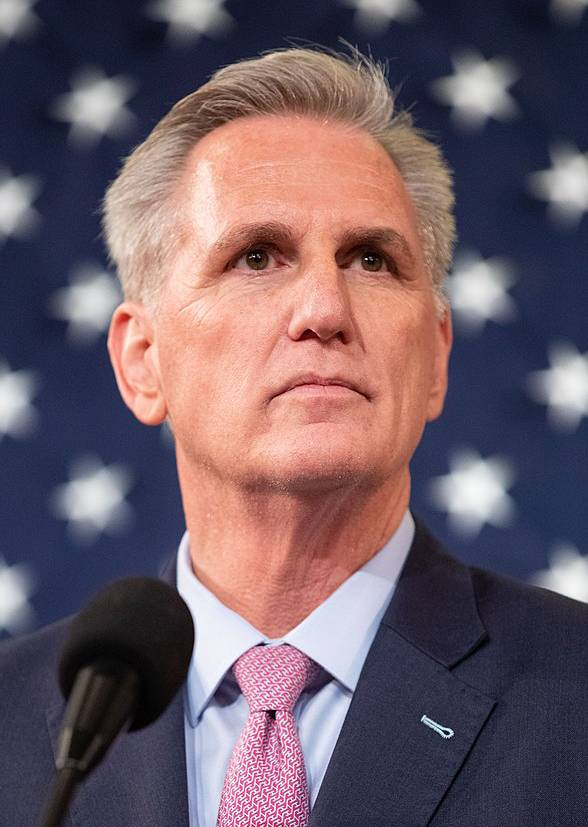

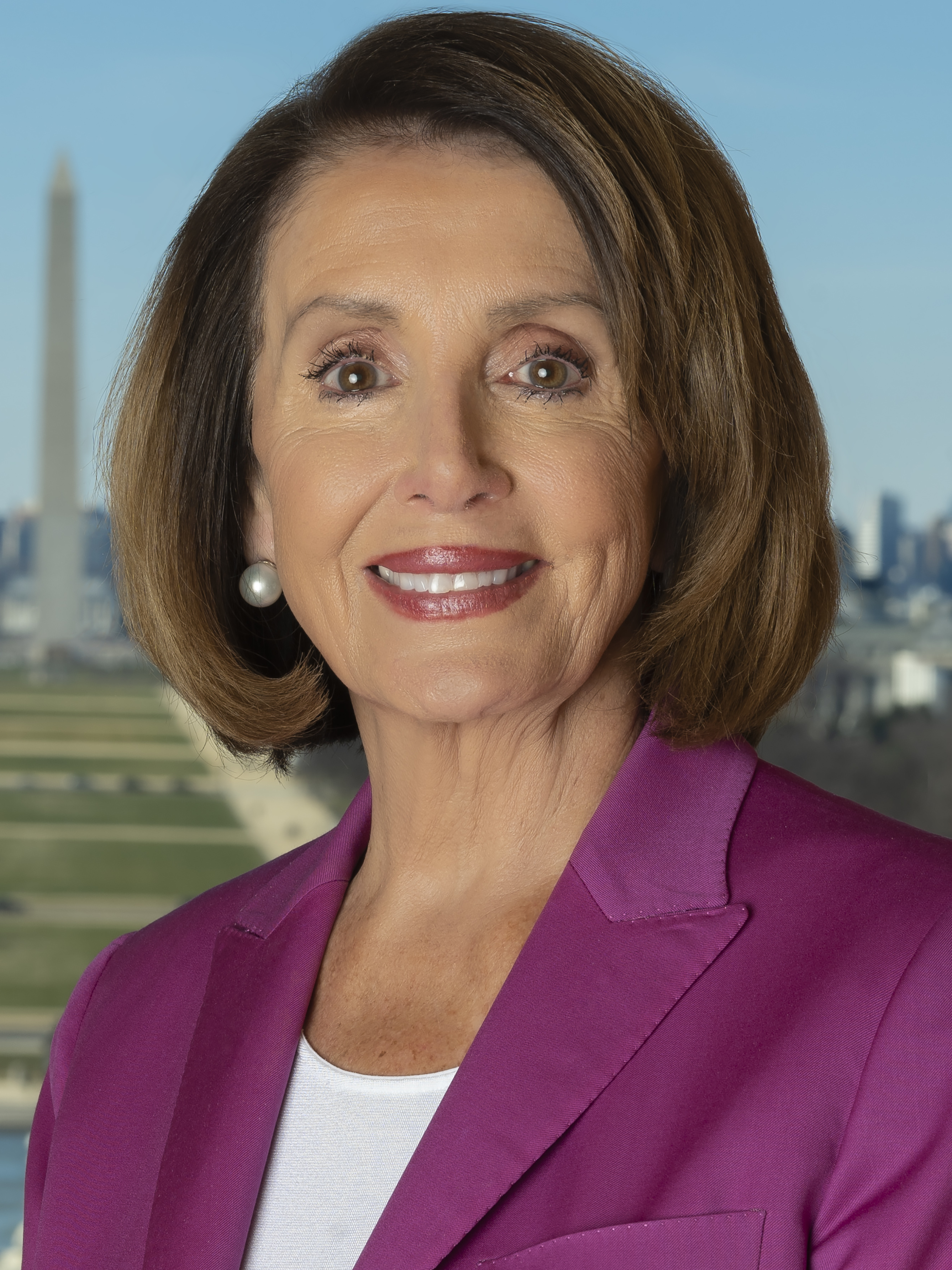
	Majority party	Minority party
Leader	Kevin McCarthy	Nancy Pelosi
Party	Republican	Democratic
Leader since	January 3, 2019	January 3, 2003
Leader's seat	California 20th	California 11th
Last election	213 seats, 47.2%	222 seats, 50.3%
Seats before	212	220
Seats won	222	213
Seat change	▲9	▼9
Popular vote	54,227,992	51,280,463
Percentage	50.0%	47.3%
Swing	▲2.8pp	▼3.0pp
- Results; Democratic gain Republican gain Democratic hold Republican hold
Speaker before election
Nancy Pelosi
Democratic
Elected Speaker
Kevin McCarthy
Republican

The 2022 United States House of Representatives elections were held on November 8, 2022, as part of the 2022 United States elections during President Joe Biden's term. Representatives were elected from all 435 U.S. congressional districts across each of the 50 states to serve in the 118th United States Congress, as well as 5 non-voting members of the U.S. House of Representatives from the District of Columbia and four of the five inhabited insular areas. Numerous other federal, state, and local elections, including the 2022 U.S. Senate elections and the 2022 U.S. gubernatorial elections, were also held simultaneously. These were the first elections after the 2020 redistricting cycle.

The Republican Party, led by Kevin McCarthy, won control of the House, defeating Nancy Pelosi and the Democratic Party, which had held a majority in the House since 2019, as a result of the 2018 elections. Although most observers and pundits predicted large Republican gains, they instead narrowly won 4 seats over the 218 seats needed for a majority, as Democrats won several upsets in districts considered Republican-leaning or won by Donald Trump in the 2020 U.S. presidential election, such as Washington's 3rd congressional district. Republicans also won some upsets in districts that Joe Biden won by double-digits, including New York's 4th congressional district. Observers attributed Democrats' surprise over-performance to, among other factors, the issue of abortion in the United States after Dobbs v. Jackson Women's Health Organization, and the underperformance of multiple statewide and congressional Republican candidates who held extreme views, including refusal to accept the party's 2020 electoral loss. On the other hand, Democrats' political prospects were weighed down by the 2021–2022 inflation spike, which Republicans blamed on President Biden and the Democratic-controlled Congress. The elections marked the first time since 1875 that Democrats won all districts along the Pacific Ocean. This was the first time since 2004 that Republicans gained House seats in consecutive elections.

Gerrymandering during the 2020 U.S. redistricting cycle had a significant impact on the 2022 election results. Republicans made gains as a result of gerrymandering in Florida, Georgia, Tennessee, and Texas, while Democrats made gains as a result of gerrymandering in Illinois and New Mexico. Defensive gerrymanders helped both parties hold competitive seats in various states, while Republican gains in New York and Democratic gains in North Carolina and Ohio were made possible because their state supreme courts overturned gerrymanders passed by their state legislatures.

The narrow margin by which Republicans won their House majority resulted in historic legislative difficulties in the 118th Congress. Due to a number of Republican holdouts affiliated with the right-wing House Freedom Caucus, McCarthy was not elected Speaker of the House until the 15th round of voting, thus marking the first time since 1923 that a speaker was not elected in the first round. This was the smallest Republican majority since 2000, before Republicans were re-elected with a smaller majority in 2024.

== Electoral system ==
Forty-six states used the first-past-the-post voting plurality system to elect their representatives. Instant-runoff voting was used in two states (Alaska and Maine) and runoff system was used in two states (Georgia and Louisiana).

== Results ==
As mail-in voting has increased in U.S. elections, particularly since the COVID-19 pandemic, the results in some congressional races were not known immediately following the election, which was more competitive and closer than expected, as a widely predicted red wave election did not materialize. Instead, Democrats lost fewer seats than expected at less than 10 and fewer than the average (25) for the president's party since the end of World War II. Several tossup or lean Republican races were won by Democrats, including upsets in Colorado's 8th, North Carolina's 13th, and Washington's 3rd congressional districts; Washington 3rd's seat was particularly notable because the Cook Political Report had labeled the district as lean Republican and FiveThirtyEight had Marie Gluesenkamp Perez's chance of winning at 2-in-100. Democrats also narrowly missed a further upset for the Colorado's 3rd seat held by Republican Lauren Boebert; it was so close that it needed a recount.

Democrats performed better than expected in states like Ohio and Pennsylvania, benefitting from a coattail effect, and performed well in Colorado and New England but suffered substantial losses in New York. In Florida and New York, Republicans achieved state-specific red waves, and red states became redder. Gerrymandering during the 2020 U.S. redistricting cycle gave each party advantages in various states; due to advantageous maps, Republicans performed well or made gains in Florida, Georgia, Texas, and Tennessee, and Democrats made gains in Illinois and New Mexico. As of November 10, 14 seats were flipped, with Republicans gaining 11 of them for a net gain of 8 seats; Republicans needed to maintain a net gain of at least 5 seats to regain the House. Republicans won the popular vote by a 3 percent margin and would have won it even if Democrats had contested more seats than they did, which may have cost them about 1–2 percent in the final popular vote margin. According to Harry Enten of CNN, the final popular vote margin was the second-closest midterm margin for a U.S. House election in the last 70 years.

The unprecedented degree of Republican underperformance during the election defied election analysts' predictions of heavy gains, given that while a majority of voters trusted Democrats on abortion, they were disappointed with the performance of Joe Biden and Democrats on issues facing the country, such as the economy and inflation, crime, and immigration. This has been variously attributed by political commentators to the issue of abortion after Dobbs v. Jackson Women's Health Organization overturned Roe v. Wade in June 2022; candidate quality among Republicans who held extremist or unpopular views, such as denial of the 2020 U.S. presidential election results; and youth turnout, among others. According to Ron Brownstein of CNN in 2023, exit polls showed that House Democrats won independent voters by 2 percentage points, making it the first time the party holding the White House did so in a midterm election since at least 1982.

Biden described the results as a "strong night" for Democrats, and he urged for cooperation in Congress. Senator Lindsey Graham commented: "It's certainly not a red wave, that's for darn sure. But it is clear that we will take back the House." On November 9, when the results for the House were still uncertain, the Republican House leader Kevin McCarthy launched his bid to succeed long-time House Democratic leader Nancy Pelosi as Speaker of the U.S. House of Representatives. In a letter asking for support among Republicans, he wrote: "I trust you know that earning the majority is only the beginning. Now, we will be measured by what we do with our majority. Now the real work begins."

Control of the House would not be known until November 16, after Mike Garcia was projected to win reelection in California's 27th congressional district, giving Republicans a total of at least 218 seats; and giving Republicans a narrow majority. The size of the majority remained in doubt with several races still to be called more than one week after Election Day. On November 17, after Republicans were projected to win back the House, Pelosi announced that she would not seek reelection as Speaker of the House, and Hakeem Jeffries was later selected as the Democratic nominee by acclamation. On November 15, McCarthy won an internal Republican caucus poll as the party's nominee for Speaker of the House; as several members of the Republican caucus did not vote for him and had expressed opposition to his speakership, it cast doubt on how the 2023 U.S. speaker election, which began on January 3, would unfold. McCarthy's speaker bid was the first of a party leader since 1923 that did not succeed on the first ballot.

=== Federal ===
The 2022 election results are compared below to the 2020 election. The table does not include blank and over or under votes, both of which were included in the official results.

↓
222	213
Republican	Democratic

Parties	Popular vote			Seats			
Parties	Vote	%	Change	2020	2022	+/−	Strength
Republican Party	54,227,992	50.01%	+2.78%	213	222	▲9	51.0%
Democratic Party	51,280,463	47.29%	–2.97%	222	213	▼9	49.0%
Libertarian Party	724,264	0.67%	–0.05%	—	—	—	—
Independent	515,322	0.47%	+0.19%	—	—	—	—
Green Party	69,802	0.06%	=	—	—	—	—
Constitution Party	29,886	0.03%	–0.02%	—	—	—	—
Other parties	1,481,822	1.37%	+0.08%	—	—	—	—
Write-ins	113,836	0.10%	=	—	—	—	—
Totals	108,443,387	100.00%	—	435	435	Steady	100.00%
Source: Election Statistics – Office of the Clerk

=== Per state ===
State	Total seats	Republican		Democratic	
State	Total seats	Seats	Change	Seats	Change
Alabama	7	6	Steady	1	Steady
Alaska	1	0	▼1	1	▲1
Arizona	9	6	▲2	3	▼2
Arkansas	4	4	Steady	0	Steady
California	52	12	▲1	40	▼2
Colorado	8	3	Steady	5	▲1
Connecticut	5	0	Steady	5	Steady
Delaware	1	0	Steady	1	Steady
Florida	28	20	▲4	8	▼3
Georgia	14	9	▲1	5	▼1
Hawaii	2	0	Steady	2	Steady
Idaho	2	2	Steady	0	Steady
Illinois	17	3	▼2	14	▲1
Indiana	9	7	Steady	2	Steady
Iowa	4	4	▲1	0	▼1
Kansas	4	3	Steady	1	Steady
Kentucky	6	5	Steady	1	Steady
Louisiana	6	5	Steady	1	Steady
Maine	2	0	Steady	2	Steady
Maryland	8	1	Steady	7	Steady
Massachusetts	9	0	Steady	9	Steady
Michigan	13	6	▼1	7	Steady
Minnesota	8	4	Steady	4	Steady
Mississippi	4	3	Steady	1	Steady
Missouri	8	6	Steady	2	Steady
Montana	2	2	▲1	0	Steady
Nebraska	3	3	Steady	0	Steady
Nevada	4	1	Steady	3	Steady
New Hampshire	2	0	Steady	2	Steady
New Jersey	12	3	▲1	9	▼1
New Mexico	3	0	▼1	3	▲1
New York	26	11	▲3	15	▼4
North Carolina	14	7	▼1	7	▲2
North Dakota	1	1	Steady	0	Steady
Ohio	15	10	▼2	5	▲1
Oklahoma	5	5	Steady	0	Steady
Oregon	6	2	▲1	4	Steady
Pennsylvania	17	8	▼1	9	Steady
Rhode Island	2	0	Steady	2	Steady
South Carolina	7	6	Steady	1	Steady
South Dakota	1	1	Steady	0	Steady
Tennessee	9	8	▲1	1	▼1
Texas	38	25	▲2	13	Steady
Utah	4	4	Steady	0	Steady
Vermont	1	0	Steady	1	Steady
Virginia	11	5	▲1	6	▼1
Washington	10	2	▼1	8	▲1
West Virginia	2	2	▼1	0	Steady
Wisconsin	8	6	▲1	2	▼1
Wyoming	1	1	Steady	0	Steady
Total	435	222	▲9	213	▼9

Popular vote
Republican	50.0%
Democratic	47.3%
Libertarian	0.7%
Independent	0.7%
Green	0.1%
Constitution	0.0%
Other	1.4%

House seats
Republican	51.0%
Democratic	49.0%

=== Maps ===
House seats by party holding majority in state

Popular vote and seat total by states

Net changes to U.S. House seats after the 2022 elections
+1 Dem House seat +2 Dem House seats
+1 Rep House seat +2 Rep House seats
+3–4 Rep House seats
Republicans lost 1 seat due to reapportionment

District results by vote share

== Retirements ==
Retiring incumbents by district Democratic incumbent ran Democratic incumbent retired or lost renomination Republican incumbent ran Republican incumbent retired or lost renomination Democratic and Republican incumbent ran Vacant or new district

In total, 49 representatives and one non-voting delegate (30 Democrats and 20 Republicans) retired, 17 of whom (nine Democrats and eight Republicans) sought other offices.

=== Democrats ===
1. Arizona 2: Ann Kirkpatrick retired.
2. California 9: Jerry McNerney retired.
3. California 14: Jackie Speier retired.
4. California 37: Karen Bass retired to run for mayor of Los Angeles.
5. California 40: Lucille Roybal-Allard retired.
6. California 47: Alan Lowenthal retired.
7. Colorado 7: Ed Perlmutter retired.
8. Florida 7: Stephanie Murphy retired.
9. Florida 10: Val Demings retired to run for the U.S. Senate.
10. Guam at-large: Michael San Nicolas retired to run for governor of Guam.
11. Hawaii 2: Kai Kahele retired to run for governor of Hawaii.
12. Illinois 1: Bobby Rush retired.
13. Illinois 17: Cheri Bustos retired.
14. Kentucky 3: John Yarmuth retired.
15. Maryland 4: Anthony Brown retired to run for attorney general of Maryland.
16. Michigan 14: Brenda Lawrence retired.
17. New Jersey 8: Albio Sires retired.
18. New York 3: Thomas Suozzi retired to run for governor of New York.
19. New York 4: Kathleen Rice retired.
20. North Carolina 1: G. K. Butterfield retired.
21. North Carolina 4: David Price retired.
22. Ohio 13: Tim Ryan retired to run for the U.S. Senate.
23. Oregon 4: Peter DeFazio retired.
24. Pennsylvania 17: Conor Lamb retired to run for the U.S. Senate.
25. Pennsylvania 18: Mike Doyle retired.
26. Rhode Island 2: Jim Langevin retired.
27. Tennessee 5: Jim Cooper retired due to redistricting.
28. Texas 30: Eddie Bernice Johnson retired.
29. Vermont at-large: Peter Welch retired to run for the U.S. Senate.
30. Wisconsin 3: Ron Kind retired.

=== Republicans ===
1. Alabama 5: Mo Brooks retired to run for the U.S. Senate.
2. California 22: Connie Conway retired.
3. Georgia 10: Jody Hice retired to run for secretary of state of Georgia.
4. Illinois 16: Adam Kinzinger retired.
5. Indiana 9: Trey Hollingsworth retired.
6. Michigan 6: Fred Upton retired.
7. Missouri 4: Vicky Hartzler retired to run for the U.S. Senate.
8. Missouri 7: Billy Long retired to run for the U.S. Senate.
9. New York 1: Lee Zeldin retired to run for governor of New York.
10. New York 23: Joe Sempolinski retired.
11. New York 24: John Katko retired.
12. New York 27: Chris Jacobs retired.
13. North Carolina 13: Ted Budd retired to run for the U.S. Senate.
14. Ohio 7: Bob Gibbs retired.
15. Ohio 16: Anthony Gonzalez retired.
16. Oklahoma 2: Markwayne Mullin retired to run for the U.S. Senate.
17. Pennsylvania 12: Fred Keller retired.
18. Texas 1: Louie Gohmert retired to run for attorney general of Texas.
19. Texas 3: Van Taylor retired after admitting to an affair.
20. Texas 8: Kevin Brady retired.

== Resignations and death ==
Three seats were left vacant on the day of the general election due to resignations or death in 2022, two of which were not filled until the next Congress.

=== Democrats ===
Two Democrats resigned before the end of their terms.

1. Florida 13: Charlie Crist resigned August 31 to run for governor of Florida.
2. Florida 22: Ted Deutch resigned September 30 to become CEO of the American Jewish Committee.

=== Republicans ===
One Republican died in office.

1. Indiana 2: Jackie Walorski died August 3. A special election to fill the remainder of her term was held concurrently with the general election for the next full term.

== Incumbents defeated ==
Fourteen incumbents lost renomination in the primary elections and nine incumbents lost reelection in the general elections.

=== In primary elections ===
==== Democrats ====
Six Democrats, half of whom were freshmen, lost renomination.

1. Georgia 7: Carolyn Bourdeaux (first elected in 2020) lost a redistricting race to fellow incumbent Lucy McBath, who won the general election.
2. Illinois 6: Marie Newman (first elected in 2020) lost a redistricting race to fellow incumbent Sean Casten, who won the general election.
3. Michigan 11: Andy Levin (first elected in 2018) lost a redistricting race to fellow incumbent Haley Stevens, who won the general election.
4. New York 10: Mondaire Jones (first elected in 2020) sought nomination in a new district and lost to Dan Goldman, who won the general election.
5. New York 12: Carolyn Maloney (first elected in 1992) lost a redistricting race to fellow incumbent Jerry Nadler, who won the general election.
6. Oregon 5: Kurt Schrader (first elected in 2008) lost renomination to Jamie McLeod-Skinner, who lost the general election to Lori Chavez-DeRemer.

==== Republicans ====
Eight Republicans, two of whom were freshmen, lost renomination.

1. Illinois 15: Rodney Davis (first elected in 2012) lost a redistricting race to fellow incumbent Mary Miller, who won the general election.
2. Michigan 3: Peter Meijer (first elected in 2020) lost renomination to John Gibbs, who lost the general election to Hillary Scholten.
3. Mississippi 4: Steven Palazzo (first elected in 2010) lost renomination to Mike Ezell, who won the general election.
4. North Carolina 11: Madison Cawthorn (first elected in 2020) lost renomination to Chuck Edwards, who won the general election.
5. South Carolina 7: Tom Rice (first elected in 2012) lost renomination to Russell Fry, who won the general election.
6. Washington 3: Jaime Herrera Beutler (first elected in 2010) lost renomination to Joe Kent (R) and Marie Gluesenkamp Perez (D) in the blanket primary, with Gluesenkamp Perez defeating Kent in the general election.
7. West Virginia 2: David McKinley (first elected in 2010) lost a redistricting race to fellow incumbent Alex Mooney, who won the general election.
8. Wyoming at-large: Liz Cheney (first elected in 2016) lost renomination to Harriet Hageman, who won the general election.

=== In general elections ===
==== Democrats ====
Six Democrats lost re-election to Republicans.

1. Arizona 2: Tom O'Halleran (first elected in 2016) lost to Eli Crane.
2. Florida 2: Al Lawson (first elected in 2016) lost a redistricting race to incumbent Republican Neal Dunn.
3. Iowa 3: Cindy Axne (first elected in 2018) lost to Zach Nunn.
4. New Jersey 7: Tom Malinowski (first elected in 2018) lost to Thomas Kean Jr.
5. New York 17: Sean Patrick Maloney (first elected in 2012) lost to Mike Lawler.
6. Virginia 2: Elaine Luria (first elected in 2018) lost to Jen Kiggans.

==== Republicans ====
Three Republicans, two of whom were freshmen, lost re-election to Democrats.

1. New Mexico 2: Yvette Herrell (first elected in 2020) lost to Gabe Vasquez.
2. Ohio 1: Steve Chabot (first elected in 1994, and then re-elected in 2010 after losing in 2008) lost to Greg Landsman.
3. Texas 34: Mayra Flores (first elected in 2022) lost a redistricting race to incumbent Democrat Vicente Gonzalez.

== Reapportionment ==
The 2020 United States census determined how many of the 435 congressional districts each state receives for the 2020 redistricting cycle. Due to population shifts, California, Illinois, Michigan, New York, Ohio, Pennsylvania, and West Virginia each lost one seat. Conversely, Colorado, Florida, Montana, North Carolina, and Oregon each gained one seat; and Texas gained two seats.

=== New seats ===
Six new districts were created, and two districts were restored, after the 2020 redistricting process:

1. Colorado 8
2. Florida 28
3. Montana 1
4. Montana 2
5. North Carolina 14
6. Oregon 6
7. Texas 37
8. Texas 38

=== Seats eliminated ===
The following districts were eliminated and became obsolete:

1. California 53
2. Illinois 18
3. Michigan 14
4. Montana at-large
5. New York 27
6. Ohio 16
7. Pennsylvania 18
8. West Virginia 3

=== Seats with multiple incumbents running ===
The following districts had multiple incumbent representatives running, a product of multiple districts merging in redistricting.

1. Florida 2: Neal Dunn (R) defeated Al Lawson (D)
2. Georgia 7: Lucy McBath (D) defeated Carolyn Bourdeaux (D)
3. Illinois 6: Sean Casten (D) defeated Marie Newman (D)
4. Illinois 15: Mary Miller (R) defeated Rodney Davis (R)
5. Michigan 11: Haley Stevens (D) defeated Andy Levin (D)
6. New York 12: Jerry Nadler (D) defeated Carolyn Maloney (D)
7. Texas 34: Vicente Gonzalez (D) defeated Mayra Flores (R)
8. West Virginia 2: Alex Mooney (R) defeated David McKinley (R)

== Open seats that changed parties ==
=== Republican seats won by Democrats ===
1. Michigan 3: won by Hillary Scholten
2. Washington 3: won by Marie Gluesenkamp Perez

=== Democratic seats won by Republicans ===
1. Arizona 6: won by Juan Ciscomani
2. Florida 7: won by Cory Mills
3. Florida 13: won by Anna Paulina Luna
4. Guam at-large: won by James Moylan
5. New York 3: won by George Santos
6. New York 4: won by Anthony D'Esposito
7. Oregon 5: won by Lori Chavez-DeRemer
8. Tennessee 5: won by Andy Ogles
9. Wisconsin 3: won by Derrick Van Orden

== Open seats that parties held ==
=== Democratic holds/flips ===
1. California 15: won by Kevin Mullin
2. California 37: won by Sydney Kamlager
3. California 42: won by Robert Garcia
4. Colorado 7: won by Brittany Pettersen
5. Florida 10: won by Maxwell Frost
6. Florida 23: won by Jared Moskowitz
7. Hawaii 2: won by Jill Tokuda
8. Illinois 1: won by Jonathan Jackson
9. Illinois 17: won by Eric Sorensen
10. Kentucky 3: won by Morgan McGarvey
11. Maryland 4: won by Glenn Ivey
12. New Jersey 8: won by Rob Menendez
13. New York 10: won by Dan Goldman
14. North Carolina 1: won by Don Davis
15. North Carolina 4: won by Valerie Foushee
16. Ohio 13: won by Emilia Sykes
17. Oregon 4: won by Val Hoyle
18. Pennsylvania 12: won by Summer Lee
19. Pennsylvania 17: won by Chris Deluzio
20. Rhode Island 2: won by Seth Magaziner
21. Texas 30: won by Jasmine Crockett
22. Vermont at-large: won by Becca Balint

=== Republican holds/flips ===
1. Alabama 5: won by Dale Strong
2. Georgia 10: won by Mike Collins
3. Indiana 2: won by Rudy Yakym, who also won the district's special election, see below
4. Indiana 9: won by Erin Houchin
5. Mississippi 4: won by Mike Ezell
6. Missouri 4: won by Mark Alford
7. Missouri 7: won by Eric Burlison
8. New York 1: won by Nick LaLota
9. New York 22: won by Brandon Williams
10. New York 23: won by Nick Langworthy
11. North Carolina 11: won by Chuck Edwards
12. Ohio 7: won by Max Miller
13. Oklahoma 2: won by Josh Brecheen
14. South Carolina 7: won by Russell Fry
15. Texas 1: won by Nathaniel Moran
16. Texas 3: won by Keith Self
17. Texas 8: won by Morgan Luttrell
18. Wyoming at-large: won by Harriet Hageman

== Newly created seats ==
Of the 435 districts created in the 2020 redistricting, eighteen had no incumbent representative.

=== Democratic gain ===
Eight Democrats were elected in newly created seats.

1. Colorado 8: won by Yadira Caraveo
2. Illinois 3: won by Delia Ramirez
3. Illinois 13: won by Nikki Budzinski
4. Michigan 13: won by Shri Thanedar
5. North Carolina 13: won by Wiley Nickel
6. North Carolina 14: won by Jeff Jackson
7. Oregon 6: won by Andrea Salinas
8. Texas 35: won by Greg Casar

=== Republican gain ===
Ten Republicans were elected in newly created seats.

1. California 3: won by Kevin Kiley
2. California 13: won by John Duarte
3. Florida 4: won by Aaron Bean
4. Florida 15: won by Laurel Lee
5. Georgia 6: won by Rich McCormick
6. Michigan 10: won by John E. James
7. Montana 1: won by Ryan Zinke
8. New York 19: won by Marc Molinaro
9. Texas 15: won by Monica De La Cruz
10. Texas 38: won by Wesley Hunt

== Vulnerable seats ==
This is a list of House seats where the winner of the 2020 presidential election and the incumbent in the district were from different parties. The results for the 2020 elections accounted for redistricting and was representative of the new district boundaries.

=== Democratic ===
This is a list of districts that voted for Trump in 2020 but had a Democratic incumbent:

1. Alaska at-large (Trump +10.1, Mary Peltola (D) won re-election)
2. Arizona 2 (Trump +7.9, Tom O'Halleran (D) lost re-election)
3. Iowa 3 (Trump +0.3, Cindy Axne (D) lost re-election)
4. Maine 2 (Trump +6.1, Jared Golden (D) won re-election)
5. Ohio 9 (Trump +2.9, Marcy Kaptur (D) won re-election)
6. Pennsylvania 8 (Trump +2.9, Matt Cartwright (D) won re-election)

=== Republican ===
This is a list of districts that voted for Biden in 2020 but had a Republican incumbent:

1. Arizona 1 (Biden +1.5, David Schweikert (R) won re-election)
2. California 22 (Biden +12.9, David Valadao (R) won re-election)
3. California 27 (Biden +12.4, Mike Garcia (R) won re-election)
4. California 40 (Biden +1.9, Young Kim (R) won re-election)
5. California 45 (Biden +6.2, Michelle Steel (R) won re-election)
6. Nebraska 2 (Biden +6.3, Don Bacon (R) won re-election)
7. New Mexico 2 (Biden +5.9, Yvette Herrell (R) lost re-election)
8. Ohio 1 (Biden +8.5, Steve Chabot (R) lost re-election)
9. Pennsylvania 1 (Biden +4.6, Brian Fitzpatrick (R) won re-election)
10. Texas 34 (Biden +15.7, Mayra Flores (R) lost re-election)

== Closest races ==
Seventy-four races were decided by 10% or lower.

District	Winner	Margin
Colorado 3rd	Republican	0.17%
California 13th	Republican	0.42%
Michigan 10th	Republican	0.49%
New York 17th	Republican (flip)	0.64%
Colorado 8th	Democratic	0.69%
Iowa 3rd	Republican (flip)	0.69% (Note: This seat was the tipping point seat for a Republican majority.)
New Mexico 2nd	Democratic (flip)	0.70%
Connecticut 5th	Democratic	0.79%
Washington 3rd	Democratic (flip)	0.83%
Arizona 1st	Republican	0.88%
New York 22nd	Republican	0.98%
New York 18th	Democratic	1.35%
Arizona 6th	Republican (flip)	1.50%
New York 19th	Republican (flip)	1.56%
Pennsylvania 7th	Democratic	1.97%
Oregon 5th	Republican (flip)	2.08%
Pennsylvania 8th	Democratic	2.45%
Oregon 6th	Democratic	2.45%
California 34th	Democratic	2.49% (Note: Under California's "jungle primary" system, the general election was between two Democrats.)
Nebraska 2nd	Republican	2.67%
New Jersey 7th	Republican (flip)	2.80%
California 22nd	Republican	3.05%
Montana 1st	Republican	3.16%
North Carolina 13th	Democratic	3.19%
Virginia 2nd	Republican (flip)	3.41%
California 47th	Democratic	3.43%
New York 4th	Republican (flip)	3.59%
Wisconsin 3rd	Republican (flip)	3.70%
Rhode Island 2nd	Democratic	3.71%
Nevada 3rd	Democratic	3.97%
Illinois 17th	Democratic	3.97%
Virginia 7th	Democratic	4.66%
California 41st	Republican	4.69%
North Carolina 1st	Democratic	4.74%
Florida 23rd	Democratic	4.76%
California 45th	Republican	4.83%
Nevada 4th	Democratic	4.83%
Minnesota 2nd	Democratic	5.23%
California 49th	Democratic	5.26%
Ohio 13th	Democratic	5.35%
Michigan 7th	Democratic	5.42%
Ohio 1st	Democratic (flip)	5.52%
Nevada 1st	Democratic	5.61%
Indiana 1st	Democratic	5.68%
Maine 2nd	Democratic	6.10%
California 27th	Republican	6.48%
Virginia 10th	Democratic	6.51%
Pennsylvania 17th	Democratic	6.78%
Iowa 1st	Republican	6.81%
Washington 8th	Democratic	6.87%
Florida 9th	Democratic	7.27%
California 3rd	Republican	7.30%
Oregon 4th	Democratic	7.48%
New York 3rd	Republican (flip)	7.53%
Pennsylvania 10th	Republican	7.67%
New York 25th	Democratic	7.74%
Arizona 2nd	Republican (flip)	7.74%
Florida 13th	Republican (flip)	8.08%
New Hampshire 1st	Democratic	8.13%
Iowa 2nd	Republican	8.25%
Illinois 14th	Democratic	8.32%
California 21st	Democratic	8.36%
Texas 15th	Republican	8.48%
Texas 34th	Democratic	8.50%
Illinois 6th	Democratic	8.72%
North Carolina 6th	Democratic	8.85%
Wisconsin 1st	Republican	8.91%
California 26th	Democratic	9.06%
North Carolina 11th	Republican	9.28%
Maryland 6th	Democratic	9.58%
California 9th	Democratic	9.63%
Pennsylvania 1st	Republican	9.73%
Alaska at-large	Democratic	9.93%
Georgia 2nd	Democratic	9.95%

== Election ratings ==
In February 2022, The Guardian reported that "America is poised to have a staggeringly low number of competitive seats in the US House, an alarming trend that makes it harder to govern and exacerbates political polarization." The 2020 redistricting cycle resulted in 94% of the U.S. House running in relatively safe seats, often due to gerrymandering.

== Special elections ==
There were nine special elections in 2022 to the 117th United States Congress, listed here by date and district.

Special elections to the 117th Congress

District	Incumbent			This race	
District	Member	Party	First elected	Results	Candidates
Florida 20	Alcee Hastings	Democratic	1992	Incumbent died April 6, 2021. New member elected January 11, 2022. Democratic hold.	▌ ✓ Sheila Cherfilus-McCormick (Democratic) 79.0%; ▌Jason Mariner (Republican) 19.4%; Others: ▌Mike ter Maat (Libertarian) 0.7%; ▌Jim Flynn (Independent) 0.5%; ▌Leonard Serratore (Independent) 0.5%
California 22	Devin Nunes	Republican	2002	Incumbent resigned January 1, 2022, to become CEO of TMTG. New member elected June 7, 2022. Republican hold.	▌ ✓ Connie Conway (Republican) 62.1%; ▌Lourin Hubbard (Democratic) 37.9%
Texas 34	Filemon Vela Jr.	Democratic	2012	Incumbent resigned March 31, 2022, to join Akin Gump. New member elected June 14, 2022. Republican gain.	▌ ✓ Mayra Flores (Republican) 50.9%; ▌Daniel Sanchez (Democratic) 43.4%; ▌Rene Coronado (Democratic) 4.2%; ▌Juana Cantu-Cabrera (Republican) 1.6%
Nebraska 1	Jeff Fortenberry	Republican	2004	Incumbent resigned March 31, 2022, due to criminal conviction. New member elected June 28, 2022. Republican hold.	▌ ✓ Mike Flood (Republican) 52.7%; ▌Patty Pansing Brooks (Democratic) 47.3%
Minnesota 1	Jim Hagedorn	Republican	2018	Incumbent died February 17, 2022. New member elected August 9, 2022. Republican hold.	▌ ✓ Brad Finstad (Republican) 50.7%; ▌Jeff Ettinger (DFL) 46.8%; Others: ▌Richard Reisdorf (Legal Marijuana Now) 1.3%; ▌Haroun McClellan (Grassroots–LC) 0.7%
Alaska at-large	Don Young	Republican	1973 (special)	Incumbent died March 18, 2022. New member elected August 16, 2022. Democratic gain.	First round: ▌Mary Peltola (Democratic) 39.6%; ▌Sarah Palin (Republican) 30.8%; ▌Nick Begich III (Republican) 28.1%; Instant runoff: ▌ ✓ Mary Peltola (Democratic) 51.5%; ▌Sarah Palin (Republican) 48.5%
New York 19	Antonio Delgado	Democratic	2018	Incumbent resigned May 25, 2022, to become Lieutenant Governor of New York. New member elected August 23, 2022. Democratic hold.	▌ ✓ Pat Ryan (Democratic) 51.2%; ▌Marc Molinaro (Republican) 48.8%
New York 23	Tom Reed	Republican	2010 (special)	Incumbent resigned May 10, 2022, to join Prime Policy Group. New member elected August 23, 2022. Republican hold.	▌ ✓ Joe Sempolinski (Republican) 53.1%; ▌Max Della Pia (Democratic) 46.6%
Indiana 2	Jackie Walorski	Republican	2012	Incumbent died August 3, 2022. New member elected November 8, 2022. Republican hold; winner also elected to next term.	▌ ✓ Rudy Yakym (Republican) 63.3%; ▌Paul Steury (Democratic) 33.4%; ▌William Henry (Libertarian) 3.3%

== Exit poll ==
2022 U.S. House elections exit poll (Edison)
Response category	GOP	DEM	% of total vote
Total vote	50	47	100
Ideology
Liberals	7	92	24
Moderates	41	56	40
Conservatives	91	8	36
Party
Democrats	3	96	33
Republicans	96	3	36
Independents	47	49	31
Gender
Men	56	42	48
Women	45	53	52
Marital status
Married	58	41	60
Unmarried	39	59	40
Gender by marital status
Married men	59	39	30
Married women	56	42	30
Unmarried men	52	45	16
Unmarried women	31	68	23
Race/ethnicity
White	58	40	73
Black	13	86	11
Latino	39	60	11
Asian	40	58	2
Other	54	41	3
Gender by race/ethnicity
White men	63	35	36
White women	53	45	37
Black men	17	82	5
Black women	10	88	6
Latino men	45	53	5
Latina women	33	66	6
Other	47	49	5
Religious service attendance
Weekly or more	66	33	31
Occasionally	52	47	39
Never	31	66	30
White evangelical or born again Christian
Yes	83	15	24
No	40	59	76
Age
18–24 years old	36	61	7
25–29 years old	33	65	6
30–39 years old	43	54	14
40–49 years old	52	45	14
50–64 years old	55	44	31
65 and older	55	43	28
Age by race
White 18–29 years old	40	58	8
White 30–44 years old	54	43	15
White 45–64 years old	63	36	28
White 65 and older	61	38	23
Black 18–29 years old	9	89	1
Black 30–44 years old	17	82	2
Black 45–64 years old	13	86	5
Black 65 and older	10	88	3
Latino 18–29 years old	30	68	3
Latino 30–44 years old	37	60	3
Latino 45–64 years old	44	55	4
Latino 65 and older	41	58	2
Others	47	49	5
Sexual orientation
LGBT	14	84	7
Non-LGBT	53	45	93
First time voter
Yes	53	45	12
No	50	48	88
Education
College graduate	44	54	43
No college degree	55	43	57
Educational attainment
High school or less	62	36	16
Some college education	51	47	27
Associate degree	54	44	15
Bachelor's degree	46	52	25
Postgraduate degree	41	57	19
Education by race
White college graduates	47	50	34
White no college degree	66	32	39
Non-white college graduates	30	68	9
Non-white no college degree	29	68	18
Education by race/gender
White women with college degrees	42	56	17
White women without college degrees	61	37	20
White men with college degrees	52	45	17
White men without college degrees	72	26	19
Non-white	30	68	27
Income
Under $30,000	42	54	12
$30,000–49,999	46	51	18
$50,000–99,999	52	45	33
$100,000–199,999	51	47	26
Over $200,000	58	41	10
Union households
Yes	42	57	18
No	52	46	82
Military service
Veterans	62	36	14
Non-veterans	48	50	86
Region
East	43	55	20
Midwest	53	45	23
South	57	42	34
West	44	53	22
Area type
Urban	41	58	31
Suburban	52	46	52
Rural	63	34	17
Biden job approval
Strongly disapprove	95	4	45
Somewhat disapprove	45	49	10
Somewhat approve	7	91	26
Strongly approve	2	96	18
Effect of Biden's policies on country
Helping	3	95	33
Hurting	94	5	47
Not making a difference	26	71	18
Feelings about the way things are going in U.S.
Angry	78	21	33
Dissatisfied	50	48	41
Satisfied	11	87	20
Excellent	22	78	5
Decided on U.S. House vote
Before October	52	47	68
In October	42	55	19
In last week	54	43	6
In last few days	51	45	6
Issue regarded as most important
Inflation	71	28	31
Abortion	23	76	27
Crime	57	41	11
Gun policy	37	60	11
Immigration	73	25	10
Condition of the nation's economy
Poor	88	10	38
Not so good	35	62	38
Good	9	89	21
Excellent	N/A	N/A	2
Family's financial situation today
Worse than two years ago	79	19	47
About the same	25	73	33
Better than two years ago	23	75	19
Inflation caused family hardship within past year
Moderate hardship	52	46	59
Severe hardship	71	28	20
No hardship	22	75	19
Gas prices caused recent financial hardship
Yes	64	35	65
No	24	73	34
Party trusted more to handle inflation
Republican	89	9	51
Democratic	2	96	42
Abortion should be
Legal in all cases	11	86	29
Legal in most cases	38	60	30
Illegal in most cases	90	9	26
Illegal in all cases	88	11	10
Feelings about Roe v. Wade being overturned
Angry	14	85	39
Dissatisfied	51	46	21
Satisfied	81	17	21
Enthusiastic	95	4	16
Party trusted more to handle abortion
Republican	95	3	42
Democratic	4	85	53
Party trusted more to handle crime
Republican	91	8	52
Democratic	3	96	43
View of stricter gun control measures
Support	22	76	56
Oppose	88	10	40
Does anyone in household own a gun
Yes	66	32	53
No	31	68	47
Immigrants to the U.S. today do more to
Help the country	23	75	53
Hurt the country	83	16	39
Party trusted more to handle immigration
Republican	91	7	51
Democratic	4	94	45
Democracy threatened in the United States
Democracy in U.S. very threatened	50	48	36
Democracy in U.S. somewhat threatened	46	52	32
Democracy in U.S. somewhat secure	53	46	21
Democracy in U.S. very secure	50	45	9
Party viewed as too extreme
Republican Party is too extreme	2	96	39
Democratic Party is too extreme	96	3	38
Both parties are too extreme	57	38	13
Neither party is too extreme	52	45	7
Confidence in fairness/accuracy of state's elections
Very confident	28	70	47
Somewhat confident	62	36	33
Not very confident	78	20	13
Not at all confident	85	12	6
Biden won legitimately in 2020
Yes	24	74	61
No	93	6	35
Climate change concern
Very serious problem	14	83	46
Not serious problem	93	6	27
Somewhat serious problem	69	27	25
Racism in the United States
Major problem	25	73	53
Minor problem	74	23	30
Not a problem	87	11	15
Societal attitudes about gender identity/sexual orientation
Changing for worse	78	20	50
Changing for better	12	87	26
Not getting better or worse	34	61	21
Opinion of Biden's student debt relief plan
Approve	16	82	50
Oppose	85	13	47
Party trusted more to handle foreign policy
Republican	92	6	51
Democratic	4	95	45

== Alabama ==
Alabama's results

District		Incumbent			This race	
Location	PVI	Member	Party	First elected	Results	Candidates (Note: Declared candidates may seek election from other district, subject to redistricting. Some districts may have no incumbents, while others may have multiple incumbents due to redistricting.)
Alabama 1	R+16	Jerry Carl	Republican	2020	Incumbent re-elected.	▌ ✓ Jerry Carl (Republican) 84.2%; ▌Alexander Remrey (Libertarian) 15.8%
Alabama 2	R+17	Barry Moore	Republican	2020	Incumbent re-elected.	▌ ✓ Barry Moore (Republican) 69.1%; ▌Phyllis Harvey-Hall (Democratic) 29.2%; ▌Jonathan Realz (Libertarian) 1.7%
Alabama 3	R+19	Mike Rogers	Republican	2002	Incumbent re-elected.	▌ ✓ Mike Rogers (Republican) 71.2%; ▌Lin Veasey (Democratic) 25.1%; ▌Douglas Bell (Independent) 2.0%; ▌Thomas Casson (Libertarian) 1.6%
Alabama 4	R+33	Robert Aderholt	Republican	1996	Incumbent re-elected.	▌ ✓ Robert Aderholt (Republican) 84.2%; ▌Rick Neighbors (Democratic) 13.6%; ▌Johnny Cochran (Libertarian) 2.2%
Alabama 5	R+17	Mo Brooks	Republican	2010	Incumbent retired to run for U.S. Senate. Republican hold.	▌ ✓ Dale Strong (Republican) 67.2%; ▌Kathy Warner-Stanton (Democratic) 29.6%; ▌Phillip Greer (Libertarian) 3.2%
Alabama 6	R+18	Gary Palmer	Republican	2014	Incumbent re-elected.	▌ ✓ Gary Palmer (Republican) 84.7%; ▌Andria Chieffo (Libertarian) 15.3%
Alabama 7	D+14	Terri Sewell	Democratic	2010	Incumbent re-elected.	▌ ✓ Terri Sewell (Democratic) 63.6%; ▌Beatrice Nichols (Republican) 34.8%; ▌Gavin Goodman (Libertarian) 1.7%

== Alaska ==
Alaska's result by borough/census area

District		Incumbent			This race	
Location	PVI	Member	Party	First elected	Results	Candidates
Alaska at-large	R+8	Mary Peltola	Democratic	2022 (special)	Incumbent re-elected.	First round: ▌Mary Peltola (Democratic) 48.8%; ▌Sarah Palin (Republican) 25.7%; ▌Nick Begich III (Republican) 23.3%; ▌Chris Bye (Libertarian) 1.7%; Instant runoff: ▌ ✓ Mary Peltola (Democratic) 55.0%; ▌Sarah Palin (Republican) 45.0%

== Arizona ==
Arizona's results

District		Incumbent			This race	
Location	PVI	Member	Party	First elected	Results	Candidates
Arizona 1	R+2	David Schweikert; Redistricted from the 6th district	Republican	2010	Incumbent re-elected.	▌ ✓ David Schweikert (Republican) 50.4%; ▌Jevin Hodge (Democratic) 49.6%
Arizona 2	R+6	Tom O'Halleran; Redistricted from the 1st district	Democratic	2016	Incumbent lost re-election. Republican gain.	▌ ✓ Eli Crane (Republican) 53.9%; ▌Tom O'Halleran (Democratic) 46.1%
Arizona 3	D+24	Ruben Gallego; Redistricted from the 7th district	Democratic	2014	Incumbent re-elected.	▌ ✓ Ruben Gallego (Democratic) 77.0%; ▌Jeff Zink (Republican) 23.0%
Arizona 4	D+2	Greg Stanton; Redistricted from the 9th district	Democratic	2018	Incumbent re-elected.	▌ ✓ Greg Stanton (Democratic) 56.1%; ▌Kelly Cooper (Republican) 43.9%
Arizona 5	R+11	Andy Biggs	Republican	2016	Incumbent re-elected.	▌ ✓ Andy Biggs (Republican) 56.7%; ▌Javier Ramos (Democratic) 37.4%; ▌Clint Smith (Independent) 5.9%
Arizona 6	R+3	Ann Kirkpatrick; Redistricted from the 2nd district	Democratic	2008; 2010 (lost); 2012; 2016 (retired); 2018	Incumbent retired. Republican gain.	▌ ✓ Juan Ciscomani (Republican) 50.7%; ▌Kirsten Engel (Democratic) 49.3%
Arizona 7	D+15	Raúl Grijalva; Redistricted from the 3rd district	Democratic	2002	Incumbent re-elected.	▌ ✓ Raúl Grijalva (Democratic) 64.5%; ▌Luis Pozzolo (Republican) 35.5%
Arizona 8	R+10	Debbie Lesko	Republican	2018 (special)	Incumbent re-elected.	▌ ✓ Debbie Lesko (Republican) 100%
Arizona 9	R+16	Paul Gosar; Redistricted from the 4th district	Republican	2010	Incumbent re-elected.	▌ ✓ Paul Gosar (Republican) 100%

== Arkansas ==
Arkansas's results

District		Incumbent			This race	
Location	PVI	Member	Party	First elected	Results	Candidates
Arkansas 1	R+22	Rick Crawford	Republican	2010	Incumbent re-elected.	▌ ✓ Rick Crawford (Republican) 73.8%; ▌Monte Hodges (Democratic) 26.2%
Arkansas 2	R+9	French Hill	Republican	2014	Incumbent re-elected.	▌ ✓ French Hill (Republican) 60.0%; ▌Quintessa Hathaway (Democratic) 35.3%; ▌Michael White (Libertarian) 4.7%
Arkansas 3	R+15	Steve Womack	Republican	2010	Incumbent re-elected.	▌ ✓ Steve Womack (Republican) 63.7%; ▌Lauren Mallett-Hays (Democratic) 32.9%; ▌Michael Kalagias (Libertarian) 3.4%
Arkansas 4	R+20	Bruce Westerman	Republican	2014	Incumbent re-elected.	▌ ✓ Bruce Westerman (Republican) 71.0%; ▌John White (Democratic) 26.2%; ▌Gregory Maxwell (Libertarian) 2.8%

== California ==
California's results

California lost its 53rd district following the 2020 census.

District		Incumbent			This race	
Location	PVI	Member	Party	First elected	Results	Candidates
California 1	R+12	Doug LaMalfa	Republican	2012	Incumbent re-elected.	▌ ✓ Doug LaMalfa (Republican) 62.1%; ▌Max Steiner (Democratic) 37.9%
California 2	D+23	Jared Huffman	Democratic	2012	Incumbent re-elected.	▌ ✓ Jared Huffman (Democratic) 74.4%; ▌Douglas Brower (Republican) 25.6%
California 3	R+4	None (new district)			New seat. Republican gain.	▌ ✓ Kevin Kiley (Republican) 53.6%; ▌Kermit Jones (Democratic) 46.4%
California 4	D+17	Mike Thompson; Redistricted from the 5th district	Democratic	1998	Incumbent re-elected.	▌ ✓ Mike Thompson (Democratic) 67.8%; ▌Matt Brock (Republican) 32.2%
California 5	R+9	Tom McClintock; Redistricted from the 4th district	Republican	2008	Incumbent re-elected.	▌ ✓ Tom McClintock (Republican) 61.3%; ▌Mike Barkley (Democratic) 38.7%
California 6	D+7	Ami Bera; Redistricted from the 7th district	Democratic	2012	Incumbent re-elected.	▌ ✓ Ami Bera (Democratic) 55.9%; ▌Tamika Hamilton (Republican) 44.1%
California 7	D+17	Doris Matsui; Redistricted from the 6th district	Democratic	2005 (special)	Incumbent re-elected.	▌ ✓ Doris Matsui (Democratic) 68.3%; ▌Max Semenenko (Republican) 31.7%
California 8	D+26	John Garamendi; Redistricted from the 3rd district	Democratic	2009 (special)	Incumbent re-elected.	▌ ✓ John Garamendi (Democratic) 75.7%; ▌Rudy Recile (Republican) 24.3%
California 9	D+5	Jerry McNerney	Democratic	2006	Incumbent retired. Democratic loss.	▌ ✓ Josh Harder (Democratic) 54.8%; ▌Tom Patti (Republican) 45.2%
California 9	D+5	Josh Harder; Redistricted from the 10th district	Democratic	2018	Incumbent re-elected.	▌ ✓ Josh Harder (Democratic) 54.8%; ▌Tom Patti (Republican) 45.2%
California 10	D+18	Mark DeSaulnier; Redistricted from the 11th district	Democratic	2014	Incumbent re-elected.	▌ ✓ Mark DeSaulnier (Democratic) 78.9%; ▌Michael Kerr (Green) 21.1%
California 11	D+37	Nancy Pelosi; Redistricted from the 12th district	Democratic	1987 (special)	Incumbent re-elected.	▌ ✓ Nancy Pelosi (Democratic) 84.0%; ▌John Dennis (Republican) 16.0%
California 12	D+40	Barbara Lee; Redistricted from the 13th district	Democratic	1998 (special)	Incumbent re-elected.	▌ ✓ Barbara Lee (Democratic) 90.5%; ▌Stephen Slauson (Republican) 9.5%
California 13	D+4	None (new district)			New seat. Republican gain.	▌ ✓ John Duarte (Republican) 50.2%; ▌Adam Gray (Democratic) 49.8%
California 14	D+22	Eric Swalwell; Redistricted from the 15th district	Democratic	2012	Incumbent re-elected.	▌ ✓ Eric Swalwell (Democratic) 69.3%; ▌Alison Hayden (Republican) 30.7%
California 15	D+28	Jackie Speier; Redistricted from the 14th district	Democratic	2008 (special)	Incumbent retired. Democratic hold.	▌ ✓ Kevin Mullin (Democratic) 55.5%; ▌David Canepa (Democratic) 44.5%
California 16	D+26	Anna Eshoo; Redistricted from the 18th district	Democratic	1992	Incumbent re-elected.	▌ ✓ Anna Eshoo (Democratic) 57.8%; ▌Rishi Kumar (Democratic) 42.2%
California 17	D+23	Ro Khanna	Democratic	2016	Incumbent re-elected.	▌ ✓ Ro Khanna (Democratic) 70.9%; ▌Ritesh Tandon (Republican) 29.1%
California 18	D+21	Zoe Lofgren; Redistricted from the 19th district	Democratic	1994	Incumbent re-elected.	▌ ✓ Zoe Lofgren (Democratic) 65.9%; ▌Peter Hernandez (Republican) 34.1%
California 19	D+18	Jimmy Panetta; Redistricted from the 20th district	Democratic	2016	Incumbent re-elected.	▌ ✓ Jimmy Panetta (Democratic) 68.7%; ▌Jeff Gorman (Republican) 31.3%
California 20	R+16	Connie Conway; Redistricted from the 22nd district	Republican	2022 (special)	Incumbent retired. Republican loss.	▌ ✓ Kevin McCarthy (Republican) 67.2%; ▌Marisa Wood (Democratic) 32.8%
California 20	R+16	Kevin McCarthy; Redistricted from the 23rd district	Republican	2006	Incumbent re-elected.	▌ ✓ Kevin McCarthy (Republican) 67.2%; ▌Marisa Wood (Democratic) 32.8%
California 21	D+9	Jim Costa; Redistricted from the 16th district	Democratic	2004	Incumbent re-elected.	▌ ✓ Jim Costa (Democratic) 54.2%; ▌Michael Maher (Republican) 45.8%
California 22	D+5	David Valadao; Redistricted from the 21st district	Republican	2012; 2018 (lost); 2020	Incumbent re-elected.	▌ ✓ David Valadao (Republican) 51.5%; ▌Rudy Salas (Democratic) 48.5%
California 23	R+8	Jay Obernolte; Redistricted from the 8th district	Republican	2020	Incumbent re-elected.	▌ ✓ Jay Obernolte (Republican) 61.0%; ▌Derek Marshall (Democratic) 39.0%
California 24	D+13	Salud Carbajal	Democratic	2016	Incumbent re-elected.	▌ ✓ Salud Carbajal (Democratic) 60.6%; ▌Brad Allen (Republican) 39.4%
California 25	D+6	Raul Ruiz; Redistricted from the 36th district	Democratic	2012	Incumbent re-elected.	▌ ✓ Raul Ruiz (Democratic) 57.4%; ▌Brian Hawkins (Republican) 42.6%
California 26	D+8	Julia Brownley	Democratic	2012	Incumbent re-elected.	▌ ✓ Julia Brownley (Democratic) 54.5%; ▌Matt Jacobs (Republican) 45.5%
California 27	D+4	Mike Garcia; Redistricted from the 25th district	Republican	2020 (special)	Incumbent re-elected.	▌ ✓ Mike Garcia (Republican) 53.2%; ▌Christy Smith (Democratic) 46.8%
California 28	D+16	Judy Chu; Redistricted from the 27th district	Democratic	2009 (special)	Incumbent re-elected.	▌ ✓ Judy Chu (Democratic) 66.2%; ▌Wes Hallman (Republican) 33.8%
California 29	D+26	Tony Cárdenas	Democratic	2012	Incumbent re-elected.	▌ ✓ Tony Cárdenas (Democratic) 58.5%; ▌Angelica Dueñas (Democratic) 41.5%
California 30	D+23	Adam Schiff; Redistricted from the 28th district	Democratic	2000	Incumbent re-elected.	▌ ✓ Adam Schiff (Democratic) 71.1%; ▌Maebe A. Girl (Democratic) 28.9%
California 31	D+15	Grace Napolitano; Redistricted from the 32nd district	Democratic	1998	Incumbent re-elected.	▌ ✓ Grace Napolitano (Democratic) 59.5%; ▌Daniel Martinez (Republican) 40.5%
California 32	D+20	Brad Sherman; Redistricted from the 30th district	Democratic	1996	Incumbent re-elected.	▌ ✓ Brad Sherman (Democratic) 69.2%; ▌Lucie Volotzky (Republican) 30.8%
California 33	D+12	Pete Aguilar; Redistricted from the 31st district	Democratic	2014	Incumbent re-elected.	▌ ✓ Pete Aguilar (Democratic) 57.7%; ▌John Porter (Republican) 42.3%
California 34	D+32	Jimmy Gomez	Democratic	2017 (special)	Incumbent re-elected.	▌ ✓ Jimmy Gomez (Democratic) 51.2%; ▌David Kim (Democratic) 48.8%
California 35	D+13	Norma Torres	Democratic	2014	Incumbent re-elected.	▌ ✓ Norma Torres (Democratic) 57.4%; ▌Mike Cargile (Republican) 42.6%
California 36	D+21	Ted Lieu; Redistricted from the 33rd district	Democratic	2014	Incumbent re-elected.	▌ ✓ Ted Lieu (Democratic) 69.8%; ▌Joe Collins III (Republican) 30.2%
California 37	D+37	Karen Bass	Democratic	2010	Incumbent retired to run for mayor of Los Angeles. Democratic hold.	▌ ✓ Sydney Kamlager-Dove (Democratic) 64.0%; ▌Jan Perry (Democratic) 36.0%
California 38	D+14	Linda Sánchez	Democratic	2002	Incumbent re-elected.	▌ ✓ Linda Sánchez (Democratic) 58.1%; ▌Eric Ching (Republican) 41.9%
California 39	D+12	Mark Takano; Redistricted from the 41st district	Democratic	2012	Incumbent re-elected.	▌ ✓ Mark Takano (Democratic) 57.7%; ▌Aja Smith (Republican) 42.3%
California 40	R+2	Young Kim; Redistricted from the 39th district	Republican	2020	Incumbent re-elected.	▌ ✓ Young Kim (Republican) 56.8%; ▌Asif Mahmood (Democratic) 43.2%
California 41	R+3	Ken Calvert; Redistricted from the 42nd district	Republican	1992	Incumbent re-elected.	▌ ✓ Ken Calvert (Republican) 52.3%; ▌Will Rollins (Democratic) 47.7%
California 42	D+22	Lucille Roybal-Allard; Redistricted from the 40th district	Democratic	1992	Incumbent retired. Democratic hold.	▌ ✓ Robert Garcia (Democratic) 68.4%; ▌John Briscoe (Republican) 31.6%
California 42	D+22	Alan Lowenthal; Redistricted from the 47th district	Democratic	2012	Incumbent retired. Democratic loss.	▌ ✓ Robert Garcia (Democratic) 68.4%; ▌John Briscoe (Republican) 31.6%
California 43	D+32	Maxine Waters	Democratic	1990	Incumbent re-elected.	▌ ✓ Maxine Waters (Democratic) 77.3%; ▌Omar Navarro (Republican) 22.7%
California 44	D+24	Nanette Barragán	Democratic	2016	Incumbent re-elected.	▌ ✓ Nanette Barragán (Democratic) 72.2%; ▌Paul Jones (Republican) 27.8%
California 45	D+2	Michelle Steel; Redistricted from the 48th district	Republican	2020	Incumbent re-elected.	▌ ✓ Michelle Steel (Republican) 52.4%; ▌Jay Chen (Democratic) 47.6%
California 46	D+15	Lou Correa	Democratic	2016	Incumbent re-elected.	▌ ✓ Lou Correa (Democratic) 61.8%; ▌Christopher Gonzales (Republican) 38.2%
California 47	D+3	Katie Porter; Redistricted from the 45th district	Democratic	2018	Incumbent re-elected.	▌ ✓ Katie Porter (Democratic) 51.7%; ▌Scott Baugh (Republican) 48.3%
California 48	R+9	Darrell Issa; Redistricted from the 50th district	Republican	2000; 2018 (retired); 2020	Incumbent re-elected.	▌ ✓ Darrell Issa (Republican) 60.4%; ▌Stephen Houlahan (Democratic) 39.6%
California 49	D+3	Mike Levin	Democratic	2018	Incumbent re-elected.	▌ ✓ Mike Levin (Democratic) 52.6%; ▌Brian Maryott (Republican) 47.4%
California 50	D+14	Scott Peters; Redistricted from the 52nd district	Democratic	2012	Incumbent re-elected.	▌ ✓ Scott Peters (Democratic) 62.8%; ▌Corey Gustafson (Republican) 37.2%
California 51	D+12	Sara Jacobs; Redistricted from the 53rd district	Democratic	2020	Incumbent re-elected.	▌ ✓ Sara Jacobs (Democratic) 61.9%; ▌Stan Caplan (Republican) 38.1%
California 52	D+18	Juan Vargas; Redistricted from the 51st district	Democratic	2012	Incumbent re-elected.	▌ ✓ Juan Vargas (Democratic) 66.7%; ▌Tyler Geffeney (Republican) 33.3%

== Colorado ==
Colorado's results

Colorado gained its 8th district following the 2020 census.

District		Incumbent			This race	
Location	PVI	Member	Party	First elected	Results	Candidates
Colorado 1	D+29	Diana DeGette	Democratic	1996	Incumbent re-elected.	▌ ✓ Diana DeGette (Democratic) 80.3%; ▌Jennifer Qualteri (Republican) 17.5%; ▌John Kittleson (Libertarian) 2.2%
Colorado 2	D+17	Joe Neguse	Democratic	2018	Incumbent re-elected.	▌ ✓ Joe Neguse (Democratic) 70.0%; ▌Marshall Dawson (Republican) 28.0%; Others: ▌Steve Yurash (Center) 0.8%; ▌Gary Nation (Constitution) 0.6%; ▌Tim Wolf (Unity) 0.6%
Colorado 3	R+7	Lauren Boebert	Republican	2020	Incumbent re-elected.	▌ ✓ Lauren Boebert (Republican) 50.1%; ▌Adam Frisch (Democratic) 49.9%
Colorado 4	R+13	Ken Buck	Republican	2014	Incumbent re-elected.	▌ ✓ Ken Buck (Republican) 60.9%; ▌Ike McCorkle (Democratic) 36.6%; ▌Ryan McGonigal (Constitution) 2.5%
Colorado 5	R+9	Doug Lamborn	Republican	2006	Incumbent re-elected.	▌ ✓ Doug Lamborn (Republican) 56.0%; ▌David Torres (Democratic) 40.3%; ▌Brian Flanagan (Libertarian) 2.5%; ▌Christopher Mitchell (Constitution) 1.2%
Colorado 6	D+9	Jason Crow	Democratic	2018	Incumbent re-elected.	▌ ✓ Jason Crow (Democratic) 60.6%; ▌Steven Monahan (Republican) 37.4%; ▌Eric Mulder (Libertarian) 2.0%
Colorado 7	D+4	Ed Perlmutter	Democratic	2006	Incumbent retired. Democratic hold.	▌ ✓ Brittany Pettersen (Democratic) 56.4%; ▌Erik Aadland (Republican) 41.4%; Others: ▌Ross Klopf (Libertarian) 1.7%; ▌Critter Milton (Unity) 0.5%
Colorado 8	EVEN	None (new district)			New seat. Democratic gain.	▌ ✓ Yadira Caraveo (Democratic) 48.4%; ▌Barbara Kirkmeyer (Republican) 47.7%; ▌Richard Ward (Libertarian) 3.9%

== Connecticut ==
Connecticut's results

District		Incumbent			This race	
Location	PVI	Member	Party	First elected	Results	Candidates
Connecticut 1	D+12	John B. Larson	Democratic	1998	Incumbent re-elected.	▌ ✓ John B. Larson (Democratic) 61.3%; ▌Larry Lazor (Republican) 37.5%; ▌Mary Sanders (Green) 1.2%
Connecticut 2	D+3	Joe Courtney	Democratic	2006	Incumbent re-elected.	▌ ✓ Joe Courtney (Democratic) 58.2%; ▌Mike France (Republican) 40.2%; Others: ▌Kevin Blacker (Green) 0.9%; ▌William Hall (Libertarian) 0.8%
Connecticut 3	D+7	Rosa DeLauro	Democratic	1990	Incumbent re-elected.	▌ ✓ Rosa DeLauro (Democratic) 56.8%; ▌Lesley DeNardis (Republican) 40.7%; Others: ▌Amy Chai (Independent) 1.7%; ▌Justin Paglino (Green) 0.8%
Connecticut 4	D+13	Jim Himes	Democratic	2008	Incumbent re-elected.	▌ ✓ Jim Himes (Democratic) 59.4%; ▌Jayme Stevenson (Republican) 40.6%
Connecticut 5	D+3	Jahana Hayes	Democratic	2018	Incumbent re-elected.	▌ ✓ Jahana Hayes (Democratic) 50.4%; ▌George Logan (Republican) 49.6%

== Delaware ==
Delaware's results

District		Incumbent			This race	
Location	PVI	Member	Party	First elected	Results	Candidates
Delaware at-large	D+7	Lisa Blunt Rochester	Democratic	2016	Incumbent re-elected.	▌ ✓ Lisa Blunt Rochester (Democratic) 55.5%; ▌Lee Murphy (Republican) 43.0%; Others: ▌Cody McNutt (Libertarian) 1.0%; ▌David Rogers (Independent) 0.6%

== Florida ==
Florida's results

Florida gained its 28th district following the 2020 census.

District		Incumbent			This race	
Location	PVI	Member	Party	First elected	Results	Candidates
Florida 1	R+19	Matt Gaetz	Republican	2016	Incumbent re-elected.	▌ ✓ Matt Gaetz (Republican) 67.9%; ▌Rebekah Jones (Democratic) 32.1%
Florida 2	R+8	Neal Dunn	Republican	2016	Incumbent re-elected.	▌ ✓ Neal Dunn (Republican) 59.8%; ▌Al Lawson (Democratic) 40.2%
Florida 2	R+8	Al Lawson; Redistricted from the 5th district	Democratic	2016	Incumbent lost re-election. Democratic loss.	▌ ✓ Neal Dunn (Republican) 59.8%; ▌Al Lawson (Democratic) 40.2%
Florida 3	R+9	Kat Cammack	Republican	2020	Incumbent re-elected.	▌ ✓ Kat Cammack (Republican) 62.5%; ▌Danielle Hawk (Democratic) 36.3%; ▌Linda Brooks (Independent) 1.2%
Florida 4	R+6	None (new district)			New seat. Republican gain.	▌ ✓ Aaron Bean (Republican) 60.5%; ▌LaShonda Holloway (Democratic) 39.5%
Florida 5	R+11	John Rutherford; Redistricted from the 4th district	Republican	2016	Incumbent re-elected.	▌ ✓ John Rutherford (Republican) 100%
Florida 6	R+14	Mike Waltz	Republican	2018	Incumbent re-elected.	▌ ✓ Mike Waltz (Republican) 75.3%; ▌Joe Hannoush (Libertarian) 24.7%
Florida 7	R+5	Stephanie Murphy	Democratic	2016	Incumbent retired. New member elected. Republican gain.	▌ ✓ Cory Mills (Republican) 58.5%; ▌Karen Green (Democratic) 41.5%
Florida 8	R+11	Bill Posey	Republican	2008	Incumbent re-elected.	▌ ✓ Bill Posey (Republican) 64.9%; ▌Joanne Terry (Democratic) 35.1%
Florida 9	D+8	Darren Soto	Democratic	2016	Incumbent re-elected.	▌ ✓ Darren Soto (Democratic) 53.6%; ▌Scotty Moore (Republican) 46.4%
Florida 10	D+14	Val Demings	Democratic	2016	Incumbent retired to run for U.S. Senate. Democratic hold.	▌ ✓ Maxwell Frost (Democratic) 59.0%; ▌Calvin Wimbish (Republican) 39.4%; Others: ▌Jason Holic (Independent) 1.0%; ▌Usha Jain (Independent) 0.6%
Florida 11	R+8	Daniel Webster	Republican	2010	Incumbent re-elected.	▌ ✓ Daniel Webster (Republican) 63.1%; ▌Shante Munns (Democratic) 35.4%; ▌Kevin Porter (Independent) 1.5%
Florida 12	R+17	Gus Bilirakis	Republican	2006	Incumbent re-elected.	▌ ✓ Gus Bilirakis (Republican) 70.4%; ▌Kimberly Walker (Democratic) 29.6%
Florida 13	R+6	Vacant			Rep. Charlie Crist (D) resigned August 31, 2022, to run for governor of Florida. Republican gain.	▌ ✓ Anna Paulina Luna (Republican) 53.1%; ▌Eric Lynn (Democratic) 45.1%; ▌Frank Craft (Libertarian) 1.8%
Florida 14	D+8	Kathy Castor	Democratic	2006	Incumbent re-elected.	▌ ✓ Kathy Castor (Democratic) 56.9%; ▌James Judge (Republican) 43.1%
Florida 15	R+4	None (new district)			New seat. Republican gain.	▌ ✓ Laurel Lee (Republican) 58.5%; ▌Alan Cohn (Democratic) 41.5%
Florida 16	R+7	Vern Buchanan	Republican	2006	Incumbent re-elected.	▌ ✓ Vern Buchanan (Republican) 62.2%; ▌Jan Schneider (Democratic) 37.8%
Florida 17	R+10	Greg Steube	Republican	2018	Incumbent re-elected.	▌ ✓ Greg Steube (Republican) 63.8%; ▌Andrea Kale (Democratic) 35.5%; ▌Theodore Murray (Independent) 0.6%
Florida 18	R+13	Scott Franklin; Redistricted from the 15th district	Republican	2020	Incumbent re-elected.	▌ ✓ Scott Franklin (Republican) 74.7%; ▌Keith Hayden (Independent) 25.3%
Florida 19	R+13	Byron Donalds	Republican	2020	Incumbent re-elected.	▌ ✓ Byron Donalds (Republican) 68.0%; ▌Cindy Banyai (Democratic) 32.0%
Florida 20	D+25	Sheila Cherfilus-McCormick	Democratic	2022 (special)	Incumbent re-elected.	▌ ✓ Sheila Cherfilus-McCormick (Democratic) 72.3%; ▌Drew-Montez Clark (Republican) 27.7%
Florida 21	R+7	Brian Mast; Redistricted from the 18th district	Republican	2016	Incumbent re-elected.	▌ ✓ Brian Mast (Republican) 63.5%; ▌Corinna Balderramos Robinson (Democratic) 36.5%
Florida 22	D+7	Lois Frankel; Redistricted from the 21st district	Democratic	2012	Incumbent re-elected.	▌ ✓ Lois Frankel (Democratic) 55.1%; ▌Daniel Franzese (Republican) 44.9%
Florida 23	D+5	Vacant			Rep. Ted Deutch (D; redistricted from FL-22) resigned September 30, 2022, to become CEO of the AJC. Democratic hold.	▌ ✓ Jared Moskowitz (Democratic) 51.6%; ▌Joe Budd (Republican) 46.8%; Others: ▌Christine Scott (Independent) 1.1%; ▌Mark Napier (Independent) 0.5%
Florida 24	D+25	Frederica Wilson	Democratic	2010	Incumbent re-elected.	▌ ✓ Frederica Wilson (Democratic) 71.8%; ▌Jesus Navarro (Republican) 28.2%
Florida 25	D+9	Debbie Wasserman Schultz; Redistricted from the 23rd district	Democratic	2004	Incumbent re-elected.	▌ ✓ Debbie Wasserman Schultz (Democratic) 55.1%; ▌Carla Spalding (Republican) 44.9%
Florida 26	R+8	Mario Díaz-Balart; Redistricted from the 25th district	Republican	2002	Incumbent re-elected.	▌ ✓ Mario Díaz-Balart (Republican) 70.9%; ▌Christine Olivo (Democratic) 29.1%
Florida 27	EVEN	María Elvira Salazar	Republican	2020	Incumbent re-elected.	▌ ✓ María Elvira Salazar (Republican) 57.3%; ▌Annette Taddeo (Democratic) 42.7%
Florida 28	R+2	Carlos A. Giménez; Redistricted from the 26th district	Republican	2020	Incumbent re-elected.	▌ ✓ Carlos A. Giménez (Republican) 63.7%; ▌Robert Asencio (Democratic) 36.3%

== Georgia ==
Georgia's results

District		Incumbent			This race	
Location	PVI	Member	Party	First elected	Results	Candidates
Georgia 1	R+9	Buddy Carter	Republican	2014	Incumbent re-elected.	▌ ✓ Buddy Carter (Republican) 59.1%; ▌Wade Herring (Democratic) 40.9%
Georgia 2	D+3	Sanford Bishop	Democratic	1992	Incumbent re-elected.	▌ ✓ Sanford Bishop (Democratic) 55.0%; ▌Chris West (Republican) 45.0%
Georgia 3	R+18	Drew Ferguson	Republican	2016	Incumbent re-elected.	▌ ✓ Drew Ferguson (Republican) 68.7%; ▌Val Almonord (Democratic) 31.3%
Georgia 4	D+27	Hank Johnson	Democratic	2006	Incumbent re-elected.	▌ ✓ Hank Johnson (Democratic) 78.5%; ▌Jonathan Chavez (Republican) 21.5%
Georgia 5	D+32	Nikema Williams	Democratic	2020	Incumbent re-elected.	▌ ✓ Nikema Williams (Democratic) 82.5%; ▌Christian Zimm (Republican) 17.5%
Georgia 6	R+11	None (new district)			New seat. Republican gain.	▌ ✓ Rich McCormick (Republican) 62.2%; ▌Bob Christian (Democratic) 37.8%
Georgia 7	D+10	Carolyn Bourdeaux	Democratic	2020	Incumbent lost renomination. Democratic loss.	▌ ✓ Lucy McBath (Democratic) 61.1%; ▌Mark Gonsalves (Republican) 38.9%
Georgia 7	D+10	Lucy McBath; Redistricted from the 6th district	Democratic	2018	Incumbent re-elected.	▌ ✓ Lucy McBath (Democratic) 61.1%; ▌Mark Gonsalves (Republican) 38.9%
Georgia 8	R+16	Austin Scott	Republican	2010	Incumbent re-elected.	▌ ✓ Austin Scott (Republican) 68.6%; ▌Darrius Butler (Democratic) 31.4%
Georgia 9	R+22	Andrew Clyde	Republican	2020	Incumbent re-elected.	▌ ✓ Andrew Clyde (Republican) 72.4%; ▌Mike Ford (Democratic) 27.6%
Georgia 10	R+15	Jody Hice	Republican	2014	Incumbent retired to run for Georgia Secretary of State. Republican hold.	▌ ✓ Mike Collins (Republican) 64.5%; ▌Tabitha Johnson-Green (Democratic) 35.5%
Georgia 11	R+11	Barry Loudermilk	Republican	2014	Incumbent re-elected.	▌ ✓ Barry Loudermilk (Republican) 62.6%; ▌Antonio Daza (Democratic) 37.4%
Georgia 12	R+8	Rick Allen	Republican	2014	Incumbent re-elected.	▌ ✓ Rick Allen (Republican) 59.6%; ▌Liz Johnson (Democratic) 40.4%
Georgia 13	D+28	David Scott	Democratic	2002	Incumbent re-elected.	▌ ✓ David Scott (Democratic) 81.8%; ▌Caesar Gonzales (Republican) 18.2%
Georgia 14	R+22	Marjorie Taylor Greene	Republican	2020	Incumbent re-elected.	▌ ✓ Marjorie Taylor Greene (Republican) 65.9%; ▌Marcus Flowers (Democratic) 34.1%

== Hawaii ==
Hawaii's results

District		Incumbent			This race	
Location	PVI	Member	Party	First elected	Results	Candidates
Hawaii 1	D+14	Ed Case	Democratic	2002 (special); 2006 (retired); 2018	Incumbent re-elected.	▌ ✓ Ed Case (Democratic) 73.7%; ▌Conrad Kress (Republican) 26.3%
Hawaii 2	D+14	Kai Kahele	Democratic	2020	Incumbent retired to run for governor of Hawaii. Democratic hold.	▌ ✓ Jill Tokuda (Democratic) 62.2%; ▌Joe Akana (Republican) 35.3%; ▌Michelle Tippens (Libertarian) 2.5%

== Idaho ==
Idaho's results

District		Incumbent			This race	
Location	PVI	Member	Party	First elected	Results	Candidates
Idaho 1	R+22	Russ Fulcher	Republican	2018	Incumbent re-elected.	▌ ✓ Russ Fulcher (Republican) 71.3%; ▌Kaylee Peterson (Democratic) 26.3%; ▌Darian Drake (Libertarian) 2.3%
Idaho 2	R+14	Mike Simpson	Republican	1998	Incumbent re-elected.	▌ ✓ Mike Simpson (Republican) 63.6%; ▌Wendy Norman (Democratic) 36.4%

== Illinois ==
Illinois's results

Illinois lost its 18th district following the 2020 census.

District		Incumbent			This race	
Location	PVI	Member	Party	First elected	Results	Candidates
Illinois 1	D+20	Bobby Rush	Democratic	1992	Incumbent retired. Democratic hold.	▌ ✓ Jonathan Jackson (Democratic) 67.0%; ▌Eric Carlson (Republican) 33.0%
Illinois 2	D+19	Robin Kelly	Democratic	2013 (special)	Incumbent re-elected.	▌ ✓ Robin Kelly (Democratic) 67.1%; ▌Thomas Lynch (Republican) 32.9%
Illinois 3	D+20	None (new district)			New seat. Democratic gain.	▌ ✓ Delia Ramirez (Democratic) 68.5%; ▌Justin Burau (Republican) 31.5%
Illinois 4	D+22	Chuy García	Democratic	2018	Incumbent re-elected.	▌ ✓ Chuy García (Democratic) 68.4%; ▌James Falakos (Republican) 28.1%; ▌Edward Hershey (Working Class) 3.5%
Illinois 5	D+18	Mike Quigley	Democratic	2009 (special)	Incumbent re-elected.	▌ ✓ Mike Quigley (Democratic) 69.6%; ▌Tommy Hanson (Republican) 28.8%; ▌Jerico Cruz (Independent) 1.6%
Illinois 6	D+3	Sean Casten	Democratic	2018	Incumbent re-elected.	▌ ✓ Sean Casten (Democratic) 54.4%; ▌Keith Pekau (Republican) 45.6%
Illinois 6	D+3	Marie Newman; Redistricted from the 3rd district	Democratic	2020	Incumbent lost renomination. Democratic loss.	▌ ✓ Sean Casten (Democratic) 54.4%; ▌Keith Pekau (Republican) 45.6%
Illinois 7	D+36	Danny Davis	Democratic	1996	Incumbent re-elected.	▌ ✓ Danny Davis (Democratic) 100%
Illinois 8	D+6	Raja Krishnamoorthi	Democratic	2016	Incumbent re-elected.	▌ ✓ Raja Krishnamoorthi (Democratic) 56.9%; ▌Chris Dargis (Republican) 43.1%
Illinois 9	D+19	Jan Schakowsky	Democratic	1998	Incumbent re-elected.	▌ ✓ Jan Schakowsky (Democratic) 71.7%; ▌Max Rice (Republican) 28.3%
Illinois 10	D+11	Brad Schneider	Democratic	2012; 2014 (lost); 2016	Incumbent re-elected.	▌ ✓ Brad Schneider (Democratic) 63.0%; ▌Joseph Severino (Republican) 37.0%
Illinois 11	D+5	Bill Foster	Democratic	2008 (special); 2010 (lost); 2012	Incumbent re-elected.	▌ ✓ Bill Foster (Democratic) 56.5%; ▌Catalina Lauf (Republican) 43.5%
Illinois 12	R+24	Mike Bost	Republican	2014	Incumbent re-elected.	▌ ✓ Mike Bost (Republican) 75.0%; ▌Chip Markel (Democratic) 25.0%
Illinois 13	D+3	None (new district)			New seat. Democratic gain.	▌ ✓ Nikki Budzinski (Democratic) 56.6%; ▌Regan Deering (Republican) 43.4%
Illinois 14	D+4	Lauren Underwood	Democratic	2018	Incumbent re-elected.	▌ ✓ Lauren Underwood (Democratic) 54.2%; ▌Scott Gryder (Republican) 45.8%
Illinois 15	R+22	Mary Miller	Republican	2020	Incumbent re-elected.	▌ ✓ Mary Miller (Republican) 71.1%; ▌Paul Lange (Democratic) 28.9%
Illinois 15	R+22	Rodney Davis; Redistricted from the 13th district	Republican	2012	Incumbent lost renomination. Republican loss.	▌ ✓ Mary Miller (Republican) 71.1%; ▌Paul Lange (Democratic) 28.9%
Illinois 16	R+13	Adam Kinzinger	Republican	2010	Incumbent retired. Republican loss.	▌ ✓ Darin LaHood (Republican) 66.3%; ▌Elizabeth Haderlein (Democratic) 33.7%
Illinois 16	R+13	Darin LaHood; Redistricted from the 18th district	Republican	2015 (special)	Incumbent re-elected.	▌ ✓ Darin LaHood (Republican) 66.3%; ▌Elizabeth Haderlein (Democratic) 33.7%
Illinois 17	D+2	Cheri Bustos	Democratic	2012	Incumbent retired. Democratic hold.	▌ ✓ Eric Sorensen (Democratic) 52.0%; ▌Esther Joy King (Republican) 48.0%

== Indiana ==
Indiana's results

District		Incumbent			This race	
Location	PVI	Member	Party	First elected	Results	Candidates
Indiana 1	D+3	Frank J. Mrvan	Democratic	2020	Incumbent re-elected.	▌ ✓ Frank J. Mrvan (Democratic) 52.8%; ▌Jennifer-Ruth Green (Republican) 47.2%
Indiana 2	R+14	Vacant			Rep. Jackie Walorski (R) died August 3, 2022. Republican hold. Winner also elected to unexpired term; see above.	▌ ✓ Rudy Yakym (Republican) 64.6%; ▌Paul Steury (Democratic) 32.4%; ▌William Henry (Libertarian) 3.0%
Indiana 3	R+18	Jim Banks	Republican	2016	Incumbent re-elected.	▌ ✓ Jim Banks (Republican) 65.3%; ▌Gary Snyder (Democratic) 30.1%; ▌Nathan Gotsch (Independent) 4.7%
Indiana 4	R+18	Jim Baird	Republican	2018	Incumbent re-elected.	▌ ✓ Jim Baird (Republican) 68.2%; ▌Roger Day (Democratic) 31.8%
Indiana 5	R+11	Victoria Spartz	Republican	2020	Incumbent re-elected.	▌ ✓ Victoria Spartz (Republican) 61.1%; ▌Jeannine Lee Lake (Democratic) 38.9%
Indiana 6	R+19	Greg Pence	Republican	2018	Incumbent re-elected.	▌ ✓ Greg Pence (Republican) 67.5%; ▌Cinde Wirth (Democratic) 32.5%
Indiana 7	D+19	André Carson	Democratic	2008 (special)	Incumbent re-elected.	▌ ✓ André Carson (Democratic) 67.0%; ▌Angela Grabovsky (Republican) 30.6%; ▌Gavin Maple (Libertarian) 2.4%
Indiana 8	R+19	Larry Bucshon	Republican	2010	Incumbent re-elected.	▌ ✓ Larry Bucshon (Republican) 65.7%; ▌Ray McCormick (Democratic) 31.5%; ▌Andrew Horning (Libertarian) 2.7%
Indiana 9	R+16	Trey Hollingsworth	Republican	2016	Incumbent retired. Republican hold.	▌ ✓ Erin Houchin (Republican) 63.6%; ▌Matthew Fyfe (Democratic) 33.6%; ▌Tonya Millis (Libertarian) 2.8%

== Iowa ==
Iowa's results

District		Incumbent			This race	
Location	PVI	Member	Party	First elected	Results	Candidates
Iowa 1	R+3	Mariannette Miller-Meeks; Redistricted from the 2nd district	Republican	2020	Incumbent re-elected.	▌ ✓ Mariannette Miller-Meeks (Republican) 53.4%; ▌Christina Bohannan (Democratic) 46.6%
Iowa 2	R+4	Ashley Hinson; Redistricted from the 1st district	Republican	2020	Incumbent re-elected.	▌ ✓ Ashley Hinson (Republican) 54.1%; ▌Liz Mathis (Democratic) 45.9%
Iowa 3	R+3	Cindy Axne	Democratic	2018	Incumbent lost re-election. Republican gain.	▌ ✓ Zach Nunn (Republican) 50.3%; ▌Cindy Axne (Democratic) 49.6%
Iowa 4	R+16	Randy Feenstra	Republican	2020	Incumbent re-elected.	▌ ✓ Randy Feenstra (Republican) 67.4%; ▌Ryan Melton (Democratic) 30.4%; ▌Bryan Holder (Liberty) 2.2%

== Kansas ==
Kansas's results

District		Incumbent			This race	
Location	PVI	Member	Party	First elected	Results	Candidates
Kansas 1	R+18	Tracey Mann	Republican	2020	Incumbent re-elected.	▌ ✓ Tracey Mann (Republican) 67.7%; ▌Jimmy Beard (Democratic) 32.3%
Kansas 2	R+11	Jake LaTurner	Republican	2020	Incumbent re-elected.	▌ ✓ Jake LaTurner (Republican) 57.6%; ▌Patrick Schmidt (Democratic) 42.4%
Kansas 3	R+1	Sharice Davids	Democratic	2018	Incumbent re-elected.	▌ ✓ Sharice Davids (Democratic) 54.9%; ▌Amanda Adkins (Republican) 42.8%; ▌Steven Hohe (Libertarian) 2.3%
Kansas 4	R+14	Ron Estes	Republican	2017 (special)	Incumbent re-elected.	▌ ✓ Ron Estes (Republican) 63.3%; ▌Bob Hernandez (Democratic) 36.7%

== Kentucky ==
Kentucky's results

District		Incumbent			This race	
Location	PVI	Member	Party	First elected	Results	Candidates
Kentucky 1	R+24	James Comer	Republican	2016	Incumbent re-elected.	▌ ✓ James Comer (Republican) 74.9%; ▌Jimmy Ausbrooks (Democratic) 25.1%
Kentucky 2	R+21	Brett Guthrie	Republican	2008	Incumbent re-elected.	▌ ✓ Brett Guthrie (Republican) 71.9%; ▌Hank Linderman (Democratic) 28.1%
Kentucky 3	D+9	John Yarmuth	Democratic	2006	Incumbent retired. Democratic hold.	▌ ✓ Morgan McGarvey (Democratic) 62.0%; ▌Stuart Ray (Republican) 38.0%
Kentucky 4	R+19	Thomas Massie	Republican	2012	Incumbent re-elected.	▌ ✓ Thomas Massie (Republican) 65.0%; ▌Matt Lehman (Democratic) 31.0%; ▌Ethan Osborne (Pirate) (Note: Appeared on the ballot as an independent.) 3.9%
Kentucky 5	R+32	Hal Rogers	Republican	1980	Incumbent re-elected.	▌ ✓ Hal Rogers (Republican) 82.2%; ▌Conor Halbleib (Democratic) 17.8%
Kentucky 6	R+9	Andy Barr	Republican	2012	Incumbent re-elected.	▌ ✓ Andy Barr (Republican) 65.1%; ▌Geoff Young (Democratic) 34.9%

== Louisiana ==
Louisiana's results

District		Incumbent			This race	
Location	PVI	Member	Party	First elected	Results	Candidates
Louisiana 1	R+23	Steve Scalise	Republican	2008 (special)	Incumbent re-elected.	▌ ✓ Steve Scalise (Republican) 72.8%; ▌Katie Darling (Democratic) 25.2%; ▌Howard Kearney (Libertarian) 2.0%
Louisiana 2	D+25	Troy Carter	Democratic	2021 (special)	Incumbent re-elected.	▌ ✓ Troy Carter (Democratic) 77.1%; ▌Dan Lux (Republican) 22.9%
Louisiana 3	R+21	Clay Higgins	Republican	2016	Incumbent re-elected.	▌ ✓ Clay Higgins (Republican) 64.3%; ▌Holden Hoggatt (Republican) 10.9%; ▌Lessie LeBlanc (Democratic) 10.5%; ▌Tia LeBrun (Democratic) 9.4%; Others: ▌Thomas Payne (Republican) 1.8%; ▌Gloria Wiggins (Independent) 1.4%; ▌Jake Shaheen (Republican) 0.9%; ▌Guy McLendon (Libertarian) 0.7%
Louisiana 4	R+14	Mike Johnson	Republican	2016	Incumbent re-elected.	▌ ✓ Mike Johnson (Republican) 100%
Louisiana 5	R+17	Julia Letlow	Republican	2021 (special)	Incumbent re-elected.	▌ ✓ Julia Letlow (Republican) 67.6%; ▌Oscar Dantzler (Democratic) 15.7%; ▌Walter Huff (Democratic) 8.7%; ▌Allen Guillory (Republican) 5.4%; ▌Hunter Pullen (Republican) 2.6%
Louisiana 6	R+19	Garret Graves	Republican	2014	Incumbent re-elected.	▌ ✓ Garret Graves (Republican) 80.4%; ▌Rufus Craig (Libertarian) 13.0%; ▌Brian Belzer (Republican) 6.6%

== Maine ==
Maine's results

District		Incumbent			This race	
Location	PVI	Member	Party	First elected	Results	Candidates
Maine 1	D+9	Chellie Pingree	Democratic	2008	Incumbent re-elected.	▌ ✓ Chellie Pingree (Democratic) 62.9%; ▌Ed Thelander (Republican) 37.0%
Maine 2	R+6	Jared Golden	Democratic	2018	Incumbent re-elected.	First round: ▌ Jared Golden (Democratic) 48.4%; ▌ Bruce Poliquin (Republican) 44.6%; ▌Tiffany Bond (Independent) 6.8%; Instant runoff: ▌ ✓ Jared Golden (Democratic) 53.1%; ▌Bruce Poliquin (Republican) 46.9%

== Maryland ==
Maryland's results

District		Incumbent			This race	
Location	PVI	Member	Party	First elected	Results	Candidates
Maryland 1	R+11	Andy Harris	Republican	2010	Incumbent re-elected.	▌ ✓ Andy Harris (Republican) 54.4%; ▌Heather Mizeur (Democratic) 43.1%; ▌Daniel Thibeault (Libertarian) 2.4%
Maryland 2	D+7	Dutch Ruppersberger	Democratic	2002	Incumbent re-elected.	▌ ✓ Dutch Ruppersberger (Democratic) 59.2%; ▌Nicolee Ambrose (Republican) 40.6%
Maryland 3	D+10	John Sarbanes	Democratic	2006	Incumbent re-elected.	▌ ✓ John Sarbanes (Democratic) 60.2%; ▌Yuripzy Morgan (Republican) 39.7%
Maryland 4	D+40	Anthony Brown	Democratic	2016	Incumbent retired to run for Maryland Attorney General. Democratic hold.	▌ ✓ Glenn Ivey (Democratic) 90.1%; ▌Jeff Warner (Republican) 9.7%
Maryland 5	D+15	Steny Hoyer	Democratic	1981 (special)	Incumbent re-elected.	▌ ✓ Steny Hoyer (Democratic) 65.9%; ▌Chris Palombi (Republican) 33.9%
Maryland 6	D+2	David Trone	Democratic	2018	Incumbent re-elected.	▌ ✓ David Trone (Democratic) 54.7%; ▌Neil Parrott (Republican) 45.2%
Maryland 7	D+30	Kweisi Mfume	Democratic	1986; 1996 (resigned); 2020 (special)	Incumbent re-elected.	▌ ✓ Kweisi Mfume (Democratic) 82.1%; ▌Scott Collier (Republican) 17.7%
Maryland 8	D+29	Jamie Raskin	Democratic	2016	Incumbent re-elected.	▌ ✓ Jamie Raskin (Democratic) 80.2%; ▌Gregory Coll (Republican) 18.2%; ▌Andres Garcia (Libertarian) 1.6%

== Massachusetts ==
Massachusetts's results

District		Incumbent			This race	
Location	PVI	Member	Party	First elected	Results	Candidates
Massachusetts 1	D+9	Richard Neal	Democratic	1988	Incumbent re-elected.	▌ ✓ Richard Neal (Democratic) 61.6%; ▌Dean Martilli (Republican) 38.4%
Massachusetts 2	D+13	Jim McGovern	Democratic	1996	Incumbent re-elected.	▌ ✓ Jim McGovern (Democratic) 66.3%; ▌Jeffrey Sossa-Paquette (Republican) 33.7%
Massachusetts 3	D+11	Lori Trahan	Democratic	2018	Incumbent re-elected.	▌ ✓ Lori Trahan (Democratic) 63.6%; ▌Dean Tran (Republican) 36.4%
Massachusetts 4	D+12	Jake Auchincloss	Democratic	2020	Incumbent re-elected.	▌ ✓ Jake Auchincloss (Democratic) 100%
Massachusetts 5	D+23	Katherine Clark	Democratic	2013 (special)	Incumbent re-elected.	▌ ✓ Katherine Clark (Democratic) 73.8%; ▌Caroline Colarusso (Republican) 26.2%
Massachusetts 6	D+11	Seth Moulton	Democratic	2014	Incumbent re-elected.	▌ ✓ Seth Moulton (Democratic) 62.9%; ▌Bob May (Republican) 35.2%; ▌Mark Tashjian (Libertarian) 1.9%
Massachusetts 7	D+35	Ayanna Pressley	Democratic	2018	Incumbent re-elected.	▌ ✓ Ayanna Pressley (Democratic) 84.8%; ▌Donnie Palmer Jr. (Republican) 15.2%
Massachusetts 8	D+15	Stephen Lynch	Democratic	2001 (special)	Incumbent re-elected.	▌ ✓ Stephen Lynch (Democratic) 69.8%; ▌Robert Burke (Republican) 30.2%
Massachusetts 9	D+6	Bill Keating	Democratic	2010	Incumbent re-elected.	▌ ✓ Bill Keating (Democratic) 59.2%; ▌Jesse Brown (Republican) 40.8%

== Michigan ==
Michigan's results

Michigan lost its 14th district following the 2020 census.

District		Incumbent			This race	
Location	PVI	Member	Party	First elected	Results	Candidates
Michigan 1	R+13	Jack Bergman	Republican	2016	Incumbent re-elected.	▌ ✓ Jack Bergman (Republican) 60.0%; ▌Bob Lorinser (Democratic) 37.4%; Others: ▌Liz Hakola (Working Class) 1.4%; ▌Andrew Gale (Libertarian) 1.2%
Michigan 2	R+16	John Moolenaar; Redistricted from the 4th district	Republican	2014	Incumbent re-elected.	▌ ✓ John Moolenaar (Republican) 63.7%; ▌Jerry Hilliard (Democratic) 34.3%; ▌Nathan Hewer (Libertarian) 2.0%
Michigan 3	D+1	Peter Meijer	Republican	2020	Incumbent lost renomination. Democratic gain.	▌ ✓ Hillary Scholten (Democratic) 54.9%; ▌John Gibbs (Republican) 42.0%; Others: ▌Jamie Lewis (Libertarian) 2.0%; ▌Louis Palus (Working Class) 1.2%
Michigan 4	R+5	Bill Huizenga; Redistricted from the 2nd district	Republican	2010	Incumbent re-elected.	▌ ✓ Bill Huizenga (Republican) 54.4%; ▌Joseph Alfonso (Democratic) 42.5%; ▌Lorence Wenke (Libertarian) 2.5%; ▌Curtis Clark (U.S. Taxpayers) 0.7%
Michigan 4	R+5	Fred Upton; Redistricted from the 6th district	Republican	1986	Incumbent retired. Republican loss.	▌ ✓ Bill Huizenga (Republican) 54.4%; ▌Joseph Alfonso (Democratic) 42.5%; ▌Lorence Wenke (Libertarian) 2.5%; ▌Curtis Clark (U.S. Taxpayers) 0.7%
Michigan 5	R+15	Tim Walberg; Redistricted from the 7th district	Republican	2006; 2008 (lost); 2010	Incumbent re-elected.	▌ ✓ Tim Walberg (Republican) 62.4%; ▌Bart Goldberg (Democratic) 35.0%; Others: ▌Norm Peterson (Libertarian) 1.6%; ▌Ezra Scott (U.S. Taxpayers) 1.0%
Michigan 6	D+11	Debbie Dingell; Redistricted from the 12th district	Democratic	2014	Incumbent re-elected.	▌ ✓ Debbie Dingell (Democratic) 65.9%; ▌Whittney Williams (Republican) 34.1%
Michigan 7	R+2	Elissa Slotkin; Redistricted from the 8th district	Democratic	2018	Incumbent re-elected.	▌ ✓ Elissa Slotkin (Democratic) 51.7%; ▌Tom Barrett (Republican) 46.3%; ▌Leah Dailey (Libertarian) 2.0%
Michigan 8	R+1	Dan Kildee; Redistricted from the 5th district	Democratic	2012	Incumbent re-elected.	▌ ✓ Dan Kildee (Democratic) 53.1%; ▌Paul Junge (Republican) 42.8%; ▌Kathy Goodwin (Working Class) 2.7%; ▌David Canny (Libertarian) 1.4%
Michigan 9	R+18	Lisa McClain; Redistricted from the 10th district	Republican	2020	Incumbent re-elected.	▌ ✓ Lisa McClain (Republican) 63.9%; ▌Brian Jaye (Democratic) 33.2%; Others: ▌Jim Walkowicz (Working Class) 1.8%; ▌Jake Kelts (Libertarian) 1.2%
Michigan 10	R+3	None (new district)			New seat. Republican gain.	▌ ✓ John James (Republican) 48.8%; ▌Carl Marlinga (Democratic) 48.3%; ▌Andrea Kirby (Working Class) 1.8%; ▌Mike Saliba (Libertarian) 1.1%
Michigan 11	D+7	Haley Stevens	Democratic	2018	Incumbent re-elected.	▌ ✓ Haley Stevens (Democratic) 61.3%; ▌Mark Ambrose (Republican) 38.7%
Michigan 11	D+7	Andy Levin; Redistricted from the 9th district	Democratic	2018	Incumbent lost renomination. Democratic loss.	▌ ✓ Haley Stevens (Democratic) 61.3%; ▌Mark Ambrose (Republican) 38.7%
Michigan 12	D+23	Rashida Tlaib; Redistricted from the 13th district	Democratic	2018	Incumbent re-elected.	▌ ✓ Rashida Tlaib (Democratic) 70.8%; ▌Steven Elliott (Republican) 26.3%; ▌Gary Walkowicz (Working Class) 2.9%
Michigan 12	D+23	Brenda Lawrence; Redistricted from the 14th district	Democratic	2014	Incumbent retired. Democratic loss.	▌ ✓ Rashida Tlaib (Democratic) 70.8%; ▌Steven Elliott (Republican) 26.3%; ▌Gary Walkowicz (Working Class) 2.9%
Michigan 13	D+23	None (new district)			New seat. Democratic gain.	▌ ✓ Shri Thanedar (Democratic) 71.1%; ▌Martell Bivings (Republican) 24.0%; ▌Simone Coleman (Working Class) 3.8%; ▌Chris Dardzinski (U.S. Taxpayers) 1.2%

== Minnesota ==
Minnesota's results

District		Incumbent			This race	
Location	PVI	Member	Party	First elected	Results	Candidates
Minnesota 1	R+7	Brad Finstad	Republican	2022 (special)	Incumbent re-elected.	▌ ✓ Brad Finstad (Republican) 53.9%; ▌Jeff Ettinger (DFL) 42.3%; ▌Richard Reisdorf (Legal Marijuana Now) 2.2%; ▌Brian Abrahamson (Grassroots–LC) 1.7%
Minnesota 2	D+1	Angie Craig	DFL	2018	Incumbent re-elected.	▌ ✓ Angie Craig (DFL) 51.0%; ▌Tyler Kistner (Republican) 45.7%; ▌Paula Overby (Legal Marijuana Now)^{†} (Note: Overby died on October 5, 2022, but remained on the general election ballot.) 3.3%
Minnesota 3	D+8	Dean Phillips	DFL	2018	Incumbent re-elected.	▌ ✓ Dean Phillips (DFL) 59.6%; ▌Tom Weiler (Republican) 40.4%
Minnesota 4	D+17	Betty McCollum	DFL	2000	Incumbent re-elected.	▌ ✓ Betty McCollum (DFL) 67.7%; ▌May Lor Xiong (Republican) 32.3%
Minnesota 5	D+30	Ilhan Omar	DFL	2018	Incumbent re-elected.	▌ ✓ Ilhan Omar (DFL) 75.2%; ▌Cicely Davis (Republican) 24.8%
Minnesota 6	R+12	Tom Emmer	Republican	2014	Incumbent re-elected.	▌ ✓ Tom Emmer (Republican) 62.1%; ▌Jeanne Hendricks (DFL) 37.9%
Minnesota 7	R+19	Michelle Fischbach	Republican	2020	Incumbent re-elected.	▌ ✓ Michelle Fischbach (Republican) 67.0%; ▌Jill Abahsain (DFL) 27.6%; ▌Travis Johnson (Legal Marijuana Now) 5.4%
Minnesota 8	R+8	Pete Stauber	Republican	2018	Incumbent re-elected.	▌ ✓ Pete Stauber (Republican) 57.2%; ▌Jennifer Schultz (DFL) 42.8%

== Mississippi ==
Mississippi's results

District		Incumbent			This race	
Location	PVI	Member	Party	First elected	Results	Candidates
Mississippi 1	R+18	Trent Kelly	Republican	2015 (special)	Incumbent re-elected.	▌ ✓ Trent Kelly (Republican) 73.0%; ▌Dianne Black (Democratic) 27.0%
Mississippi 2	D+11	Bennie Thompson	Democratic	1993 (special)	Incumbent re-elected.	▌ ✓ Bennie Thompson (Democratic) 60.1%; ▌Brian Flowers (Republican) 39.9%
Mississippi 3	R+15	Michael Guest	Republican	2018	Incumbent re-elected.	▌ ✓ Michael Guest (Republican) 70.7%; ▌Shuwaski Young (Democratic) 29.3%
Mississippi 4	R+22	Steven Palazzo	Republican	2010	Incumbent lost renomination. Republican hold.	▌ ✓ Mike Ezell (Republican) 73.3%; ▌Johnny DuPree (Democratic) 24.6%; ▌Alden Johnson (Libertarian) 2.0%

== Missouri ==
Missouri's results

District		Incumbent			This race	
Location	PVI	Member	Party	First elected	Results	Candidates
Missouri 1	D+27	Cori Bush	Democratic	2020	Incumbent re-elected.	▌ ✓ Cori Bush (Democratic) 72.9%; ▌Andrew Jones (Republican) 24.3%; ▌George Zsidisin (Libertarian) 2.8%
Missouri 2	R+7	Ann Wagner	Republican	2012	Incumbent re-elected.	▌ ✓ Ann Wagner (Republican) 54.9%; ▌Trish Gunby (Democratic) 43.1%; ▌Bill Slantz (Libertarian) 2.1%
Missouri 3	R+16	Blaine Luetkemeyer	Republican	2008	Incumbent re-elected.	▌ ✓ Blaine Luetkemeyer (Republican) 65.1%; ▌Bethany Mann (Democratic) 34.9%
Missouri 4	R+23	Vicky Hartzler	Republican	2010	Incumbent retired to run for U.S. Senate. Republican hold.	▌ ✓ Mark Alford (Republican) 71.3%; ▌Jack Truman (Democratic) 26.3%; ▌Randy Langkraehr (Libertarian) 2.4%
Missouri 5	D+11	Emanuel Cleaver	Democratic	2004	Incumbent re-elected.	▌ ✓ Emanuel Cleaver (Democratic) 61.0%; ▌Jacob Turk (Republican) 36.4%; ▌Robin Dominick (Libertarian) 2.5%
Missouri 6	R+21	Sam Graves	Republican	2000	Incumbent re-elected.	▌ ✓ Sam Graves (Republican) 70.3%; ▌Henry Martin (Democratic) 27.5%; ▌Andy Maidment (Libertarian) 2.2%
Missouri 7	R+24	Billy Long	Republican	2010	Incumbent retired to run for U.S. Senate. Republican hold.	▌ ✓ Eric Burlison (Republican) 70.9%; ▌Kristen Radaker-Sheafer (Democratic) 26.8%; ▌Kevin Craig (Libertarian) 2.3%
Missouri 8	R+28	Jason Smith	Republican	2013 (special)	Incumbent re-elected.	▌ ✓ Jason Smith (Republican) 76.0%; ▌Randi McCallian (Democratic) 21.9%; ▌Jim Higgins (Libertarian) 2.1%

== Montana ==
Montana's results

Montana regained its 2nd district following the 2020 census.

District		Incumbent			This race	
Location	PVI	Member	Party	First elected	Results	Candidates
Montana 1	R+6	None (new district)			New seat. Republican gain.	▌ ✓ Ryan Zinke (Republican) 49.6%; ▌Monica Tranel (Democratic) 46.5%; ▌John Lamb (Libertarian) 3.8%
Montana 2	R+16	Matt Rosendale; Redistricted from the at-large district	Republican	2020	Incumbent re-elected.	▌ ✓ Matt Rosendale (Republican) 56.6%; ▌Gary Buchanan (Independent) 21.9%; ▌Penny Ronning (Democratic) 20.2%; ▌Sam Rankin (Libertarian) 1.4%

== Nebraska ==
Nebraska's results

District		Incumbent			This race	
Location	PVI	Member	Party	First elected	Results	Candidates
Nebraska 1	R+9	Mike Flood	Republican	2022 (special)	Incumbent re-elected.	▌ ✓ Mike Flood (Republican) 58.1%; ▌Patty Pansing Brooks (Democratic) 41.9%
Nebraska 2	EVEN	Don Bacon	Republican	2016	Incumbent re-elected.	▌ ✓ Don Bacon (Republican) 51.5%; ▌Tony Vargas (Democratic) 48.5%
Nebraska 3	R+29	Adrian Smith	Republican	2006	Incumbent re-elected.	▌ ✓ Adrian Smith (Republican) 78.3%; ▌David Else (Democratic) 15.8%; ▌Mark Elworth Jr. (Legal Marijuana Now) 5.9%

== Nevada ==
Nevada's results

District		Incumbent			This race	
Location	PVI	Member	Party	First elected	Results	Candidates
Nevada 1	D+3	Dina Titus	Democratic	2008; 2010 (lost); 2012	Incumbent re-elected.	▌ ✓ Dina Titus (Democratic) 51.6%; ▌Mark Robertson (Republican) 46.0%; ▌Ken Cavanaugh (Libertarian) 2.5%
Nevada 2	R+8	Mark Amodei	Republican	2011 (special)	Incumbent re-elected.	▌ ✓ Mark Amodei (Republican) 59.7%; ▌Elizabeth Krause (Democratic) 37.8%; ▌Russell Best (Independent American) 1.4%; ▌Darryl Baber (Libertarian) 1.1%
Nevada 3	D+1	Susie Lee	Democratic	2018	Incumbent re-elected.	▌ ✓ Susie Lee (Democratic) 52.0%; ▌April Becker (Republican) 48.0%
Nevada 4	D+3	Steven Horsford	Democratic	2012; 2014 (lost); 2018	Incumbent re-elected.	▌ ✓ Steven Horsford (Democratic) 52.4%; ▌Sam Peters (Republican) 47.6%

== New Hampshire ==
New Hampshire's results

District		Incumbent			This race	
Location	PVI	Member	Party	First elected	Results	Candidates
New Hampshire 1	EVEN	Chris Pappas	Democratic	2018	Incumbent re-elected.	▌ ✓ Chris Pappas (Democratic) 54.0%; ▌Karoline Leavitt (Republican) 45.9%
New Hampshire 2	D+2	Annie Kuster	Democratic	2012	Incumbent re-elected.	▌ ✓ Annie Kuster (Democratic) 55.8%; ▌Robert Burns (Republican) 44.1%

== New Jersey ==
New Jersey's results

District		Incumbent			This race	
Location	PVI	Member	Party	First elected	Results	Candidates
New Jersey 1	D+10	Donald Norcross	Democratic	2014	Incumbent re-elected.	▌ ✓ Donald Norcross (Democratic) 62.3%; ▌Claire Gustafson (Republican) 35.2%; Others: ▌Patricia Kline (Independent) 1.5%; ▌Isaiah Fletcher (Libertarian) 0.7%; ▌Allen Cannon (Independent) 0.3%
New Jersey 2	R+5	Jeff Van Drew	Republican	2018 (Note: Van Drew was elected as a Democrat in 2018 and switched to the Republican Party in January 2020, having announced the switch in December 2019.)	Incumbent re-elected.	▌ ✓ Jeff Van Drew (Republican) 58.9%; ▌Tim Alexander (Democratic) 40.0%; Others: ▌Michael Gallo (Libertarian) 0.8%; ▌Anthony Sanchez (Independent) 0.4%
New Jersey 3	D+5	Andy Kim	Democratic	2018	Incumbent re-elected.	▌ ✓ Andy Kim (Democratic) 55.5%; ▌Bob Healey Jr. (Republican) 43.6%; Others: ▌Christopher Russomanno (Libertarian) 0.5%; ▌Gregory Sobocinski (Independent) 0.4%
New Jersey 4	R+14	Chris Smith	Republican	1980	Incumbent re-elected.	▌ ✓ Chris Smith (Republican) 66.9%; ▌Matthew Jenkins (Democratic) 31.4%; Others: ▌Jason Cullen (Libertarian) 0.7%; ▌David Schmidt (Independent) 0.5%; ▌Hank Schroeder (Independent) 0.3%; ▌Pam Daniels (Independent) 0.2%
New Jersey 5	D+4	Josh Gottheimer	Democratic	2016	Incumbent re-elected.	▌ ✓ Josh Gottheimer (Democratic) 54.7%; ▌Frank Pallotta (Republican) 44.3%; Others: ▌Jeremy Marcus (Libertarian) 0.4%; ▌Trevor Ferrigno (Independent) 0.3%; ▌Louis Vellucci (Independent) 0.2%
New Jersey 6	D+8	Frank Pallone	Democratic	1988	Incumbent re-elected.	▌ ✓ Frank Pallone (Democratic) 57.5%; ▌Sue Kiley (Republican) 41.0%; Others: ▌Tara Fisher (Libertarian) 0.7%; ▌Inder Soni (Independent) 0.5%; ▌Eric Antisell (Independent) 0.3%
New Jersey 7	R+1	Tom Malinowski	Democratic	2018	Incumbent lost re-election. Republican gain.	▌ ✓ Thomas Kean Jr. (Republican) 51.4%; ▌Tom Malinowski (Democratic) 48.6%
New Jersey 8	D+22	Albio Sires	Democratic	2006	Incumbent retired. Democratic hold.	▌ ✓ Rob Menendez (Democratic) 72.9%; ▌Marcos Arroyo (Republican) 24.2%; Others: ▌Joanne Kuniansky (Socialist Workers) 0.9%; ▌Dan Delaney (Libertarian) 0.7%; ▌David Cook (Independent) 0.7%; ▌Pablo Olivera (Labor) 0.4%; ▌John Salierno (Independent) 0.2%
New Jersey 9	D+8	Bill Pascrell	Democratic	1996	Incumbent re-elected.	▌ ✓ Bill Pascrell (Democratic) 54.9%; ▌Billy Prempeh (Republican) 43.6%; Others: ▌Lea Sherman (Socialist Workers) 0.7%; ▌Sean Armstrong (Libertarian) 0.7%
New Jersey 10	D+30	Donald Payne Jr.	Democratic	2012	Incumbent re-elected.	▌ ✓ Donald Payne Jr. (Democratic) 77.6%; ▌David Pinckney (Republican) 20.1%; Others: ▌Cynthia Johnson (Independent) 1.5%; ▌Kendal Ludden (Libertarian) 0.5%; ▌Clenard Childress (Mahali) 0.3%
New Jersey 11	D+6	Mikie Sherrill	Democratic	2018	Incumbent re-elected.	▌ ✓ Mikie Sherrill (Democratic) 59.0%; ▌Paul DeGroot (Republican) 40.2%; ▌Joseph Biasco (Libertarian) 0.8%
New Jersey 12	D+12	Bonnie Watson Coleman	Democratic	2014	Incumbent re-elected.	▌ ✓ Bonnie Watson Coleman (Democratic) 63.1%; ▌Darius Mayfield (Republican) 35.9%; ▌Lynn Genrich (Libertarian) 1.0%

== New Mexico ==
New Mexico's results

District		Incumbent			This race	
Location	PVI	Member	Party	First elected	Results	Candidates
New Mexico 1	D+5	Melanie Stansbury	Democratic	2021 (special)	Incumbent re-elected.	▌ ✓ Melanie Stansbury (Democratic) 55.8%; ▌Michelle Garcia Holmes (Republican) 44.2%
New Mexico 2	D+1	Yvette Herrell	Republican	2020	Incumbent lost re-election. Democratic gain.	▌ ✓ Gabe Vasquez (Democratic) 50.3%; ▌Yvette Herrell (Republican) 49.7%
New Mexico 3	D+4	Teresa Leger Fernandez	Democratic	2020	Incumbent re-elected.	▌ ✓ Teresa Leger Fernandez (Democratic) 58.2%; ▌Alexis Martinez Johnson (Republican) 41.8%

== New York ==
New York's results

New York lost its 27th district following the 2020 census.

District		Incumbent			This race	
Location	PVI	Member	Party	First elected	Results	Candidates
New York 1	R+3	Lee Zeldin	Republican	2014	Incumbent retired to run for governor of New York. Republican hold.	▌ ✓ Nick LaLota (Republican) 55.5%; ▌Bridget Fleming (Democratic) 44.5%
New York 2	R+3	Andrew Garbarino	Republican	2020	Incumbent re-elected.	▌ ✓ Andrew Garbarino (Republican) 60.7%; ▌Jackie Gordon (Democratic) 39.3%
New York 3	D+2	Tom Suozzi	Democratic	2016	Incumbent retired to run for governor of New York. Republican gain.	▌ ✓ George Santos (Republican) 53.8%; ▌Robert P. Zimmerman (Democratic) 46.2%
New York 4	D+5	Kathleen Rice	Democratic	2014	Incumbent retired. Republican gain.	▌ ✓ Anthony D'Esposito (Republican) 51.8%; ▌Laura Gillen (Democratic) 48.2%
New York 5	D+30	Gregory Meeks	Democratic	1998 (special)	Incumbent re-elected.	▌ ✓ Gregory Meeks (Democratic) 75.2%; ▌Paul King (Republican) 24.8%
New York 6	D+15	Grace Meng	Democratic	2012	Incumbent re-elected.	▌ ✓ Grace Meng (Democratic) 64.0%; ▌Thomas Zmich (Republican) 36.0%
New York 7	D+31	Nydia Velázquez	Democratic	1992	Incumbent re-elected.	▌ ✓ Nydia Velázquez (Democratic) 80.7%; ▌Juan Pagan (Republican) 19.3%
New York 8	D+26	Hakeem Jeffries	Democratic	2012	Incumbent re-elected.	▌ ✓ Hakeem Jeffries (Democratic) 71.7%; ▌Yuri Dashevsky (Republican) 28.3%
New York 9	D+25	Yvette Clarke	Democratic	2006	Incumbent re-elected.	▌ ✓ Yvette Clarke (Democratic) 81.5%; ▌Menachem Raitport (Conservative) 18.5%
New York 10	D+35	Mondaire Jones; Moved from the 17th district (Note: Due to redistricting, Mondaire Jones decided to move to NY-10, which is not connected by territory to NY-17.)	Democratic	2020	Incumbent lost renomination. Democratic hold.	▌ ✓ Dan Goldman (Democratic) 84.0%; ▌Benine Hamdan (Republican) 15.2%; ▌Steve Speer (Medical Freedom) 0.8%
New York 11	R+6	Nicole Malliotakis	Republican	2020	Incumbent re-elected.	▌ ✓ Nicole Malliotakis (Republican) 61.8%; ▌Max Rose (Democratic) 38.2%
New York 12	D+34	Carolyn Maloney	Democratic	1992	Incumbent lost renomination. Democratic loss.	▌ ✓ Jerry Nadler (Democratic) 81.8%; ▌Michael Zumbluskas (Republican) 18.0%; ▌Mikhail Itkis (Independent) 0.3%
New York 12	D+34	Jerry Nadler; Redistricted from the 10th district	Democratic	1992	Incumbent re-elected.	▌ ✓ Jerry Nadler (Democratic) 81.8%; ▌Michael Zumbluskas (Republican) 18.0%; ▌Mikhail Itkis (Independent) 0.3%
New York 13	D+38	Adriano Espaillat	Democratic	2016	Incumbent re-elected.	▌ ✓ Adriano Espaillat (Democratic) 100%
New York 14	D+28	Alexandria Ocasio-Cortez	Democratic	2018	Incumbent re-elected.	▌ ✓ Alexandria Ocasio-Cortez (Democratic) 70.7%; ▌Tina Forte (Republican) 27.4%; ▌Desi Cuellar (Conservative) 1.9%
New York 15	D+35	Ritchie Torres	Democratic	2020	Incumbent re-elected.	▌ ✓ Ritchie Torres (Democratic) 82.8%; ▌Stylo Sapaskis (Republican) 17.2%
New York 16	D+20	Jamaal Bowman	Democratic	2020	Incumbent re-elected.	▌ ✓ Jamaal Bowman (Democratic) 64.3%; ▌Miriam Flisser (Republican) 35.7%
New York 17	D+3	Sean Patrick Maloney; Redistricted from the 18th district	Democratic	2012	Incumbent lost re-election. Republican gain.	▌ ✓ Mike Lawler (Republican) 50.3%; ▌Sean Patrick Maloney (Democratic) 49.7%
New York 18	D+1	Pat Ryan; Redistricted from the 19th district	Democratic	2022 (special)	Incumbent re-elected.	▌ ✓ Pat Ryan (Democratic) 50.7%; ▌Colin Schmitt (Republican) 49.3%
New York 19	EVEN	None (new district)			New seat. Republican gain.	▌ ✓ Marc Molinaro (Republican) 50.8%; ▌Josh Riley (Democratic) 49.2%
New York 20	D+7	Paul Tonko	Democratic	2008	Incumbent re-elected.	▌ ✓ Paul Tonko (Democratic) 55.1%; ▌Elizabeth Joy (Republican) 44.9%
New York 21	R+9	Elise Stefanik	Republican	2014	Incumbent re-elected.	▌ ✓ Elise Stefanik (Republican) 59.2%; ▌Matt Castelli (Democratic) 40.8%
New York 22	D+1	John Katko; Redistricted from the 24th district	Republican	2014	Incumbent retired. Republican hold.	▌ ✓ Brandon Williams (Republican) 50.5%; ▌Francis Conole (Democratic) 49.5%
New York 23	R+12	Joe Sempolinski	Republican	2022 (special)	Incumbent retired. Republican hold.	▌ ✓ Nick Langworthy (Republican) 64.9%; ▌Max Della Pia (Democratic) 35.1%
New York 23	R+12	Chris Jacobs; Redistricted from the 27th district	Republican	2020 (special)	Incumbent retired. Republican loss.	▌ ✓ Nick Langworthy (Republican) 64.9%; ▌Max Della Pia (Democratic) 35.1%
New York 24	R+11	Claudia Tenney; Redistricted from the 22nd district	Republican	2016; 2018 (lost); 2020	Incumbent re-elected.	▌ ✓ Claudia Tenney (Republican) 65.7%; ▌Steven Holden (Democratic) 34.3%
New York 25	D+7	Joseph Morelle	Democratic	2018 (special)	Incumbent re-elected.	▌ ✓ Joseph Morelle (Democratic) 53.9%; ▌La'Ron Singletary (Republican) 46.1%
New York 26	D+9	Brian Higgins	Democratic	2004	Incumbent re-elected.	▌ ✓ Brian Higgins (Democratic) 64.0%; ▌Steven Sams (Republican) 36.0%

== North Carolina ==
North Carolina's results

North Carolina gained its 14th district following the 2020 census.

District		Incumbent			This race	
Location	PVI	Member	Party	First elected	Results	Candidates
North Carolina 1	D+2	G. K. Butterfield	Democratic	2004 (special)	Incumbent retired. Democratic hold.	▌ ✓ Don Davis (Democratic) 52.4%; ▌Sandy Smith (Republican) 47.6%
North Carolina 2	D+12	Deborah Ross	Democratic	2020	Incumbent re-elected.	▌ ✓ Deborah Ross (Democratic) 64.7%; ▌Christine Villaverde (Republican) 35.3%
North Carolina 3	R+15	Greg Murphy	Republican	2019 (special)	Incumbent re-elected.	▌ ✓ Greg Murphy (Republican) 66.9%; ▌Barbara Gaskins (Democratic) 33.1%
North Carolina 4	D+16	David Price	Democratic	1986; 1994 (lost); 1996	Incumbent retired. Democratic hold.	▌ ✓ Valerie Foushee (Democratic) 66.9%; ▌Courtney Geels (Republican) 33.1%
North Carolina 5	R+13	Virginia Foxx	Republican	2004	Incumbent re-elected.	▌ ✓ Virginia Foxx (Republican) 63.2%; ▌Kyle Parrish (Democratic) 36.8%
North Carolina 6	D+4	Kathy Manning	Democratic	2020	Incumbent re-elected.	▌ ✓ Kathy Manning (Democratic) 53.9%; ▌Christian Castelli (Republican) 45.0%; ▌Thomas Watercott (Libertarian) 1.1%
North Carolina 7	R+8	David Rouzer	Republican	2014	Incumbent re-elected.	▌ ✓ David Rouzer (Republican) 57.7%; ▌Charles Graham (Democratic) 42.3%
North Carolina 8	R+20	Dan Bishop; Redistricted from the 9th district	Republican	2019 (special)	Incumbent re-elected.	▌ ✓ Dan Bishop (Republican) 69.9%; ▌Scott Huffman (Democratic) 30.1%
North Carolina 9	R+6	Richard Hudson; Redistricted from the 8th district	Republican	2012	Incumbent re-elected.	▌ ✓ Richard Hudson (Republican) 56.5%; ▌Ben Clark (Democratic) 43.5%
North Carolina 9	R+6	Ted Budd; Redistricted from the 13th district	Republican	2016	Incumbent retired to run for U.S. Senate. Republican loss.	▌ ✓ Richard Hudson (Republican) 56.5%; ▌Ben Clark (Democratic) 43.5%
North Carolina 10	R+22	Patrick McHenry	Republican	2004	Incumbent re-elected.	▌ ✓ Patrick McHenry (Republican) 72.7%; ▌Pam Genant (Democratic) 27.3%
North Carolina 11	R+8	Madison Cawthorn	Republican	2020	Incumbent lost renomination. Republican hold.	▌ ✓ Chuck Edwards (Republican) 53.8%; ▌Jasmine Beach-Ferrara (Democratic) 44.5%; ▌David Coatney (Libertarian) 1.7%
North Carolina 12	D+13	Alma Adams	Democratic	2014	Incumbent re-elected.	▌ ✓ Alma Adams (Democratic) 62.7%; ▌Tyler Lee (Republican) 37.3%
North Carolina 13	R+2	None (new district)			New seat. Democratic gain.	▌ ✓ Wiley Nickel (Democratic) 51.6%; ▌Bo Hines (Republican) 48.4%
North Carolina 14	D+6	None (new district)			New seat. Democratic gain.	▌ ✓ Jeff Jackson (Democratic) 57.7%; ▌Pat Harrigan (Republican) 42.3%

== North Dakota ==
North Dakota's results

District		Incumbent			This race	
Location	PVI	Member	Party	First elected	Results	Candidates
North Dakota at-large	R+20	Kelly Armstrong	Republican	2018	Incumbent re-elected.	▌ ✓ Kelly Armstrong (Republican) 62.3%; ▌Cara Mund (Independent) 37.7%

== Ohio ==
Ohio's results

Ohio lost its 16th district following the 2020 census.

District		Incumbent			This race	
Location	PVI	Member	Party	First elected	Results	Candidatess
Ohio 1	D+2	Steve Chabot	Republican	1994; 2008 (lost); 2010	Incumbent lost re-election. Democratic gain.	▌ ✓ Greg Landsman (Democratic) 52.8%; ▌Steve Chabot (Republican) 47.2%
Ohio 2	R+25	Brad Wenstrup	Republican	2012	Incumbent re-elected.	▌ ✓ Brad Wenstrup (Republican) 74.5%; ▌Samantha Meadows (Democratic) 25.5%
Ohio 3	D+20	Joyce Beatty	Democratic	2012	Incumbent re-elected.	▌ ✓ Joyce Beatty (Democratic) 70.5%; ▌Lee Stahley (Republican) 29.5%
Ohio 4	R+20	Jim Jordan	Republican	2006	Incumbent re-elected.	▌ ✓ Jim Jordan (Republican) 69.2%; ▌Tamie Wilson (Democratic) 30.8%
Ohio 5	R+15	Bob Latta	Republican	2007 (special)	Incumbent re-elected.	▌ ✓ Bob Latta (Republican) 66.9%; ▌Craig Swartz (Democratic) 33.1%
Ohio 6	R+16	Bill Johnson	Republican	2010	Incumbent re-elected.	▌ ✓ Bill Johnson (Republican) 67.7%; ▌Louis Lyras (Democratic) 32.3%
Ohio 7	R+7	Bob Gibbs	Republican	2010	Incumbent retired. Republican hold.	▌ ✓ Max Miller (Republican) 55.3%; ▌Matthew Diemer (Democratic) 44.6%
Ohio 7	R+7	Anthony Gonzalez; Redistricted from the 16th district	Republican	2018	Incumbent retired. Republican loss.	▌ ✓ Max Miller (Republican) 55.3%; ▌Matthew Diemer (Democratic) 44.6%
Ohio 8	R+14	Warren Davidson	Republican	2016 (special)	Incumbent re-elected.	▌ ✓ Warren Davidson (Republican) 64.6%; ▌Vanessa Enoch (Democratic) 35.4%
Ohio 9	R+3	Marcy Kaptur	Democratic	1982	Incumbent re-elected.	▌ ✓ Marcy Kaptur (Democratic) 56.6%; ▌J. R. Majewski (Republican) 43.4%
Ohio 10	R+4	Mike Turner	Republican	2002	Incumbent re-elected.	▌ ✓ Mike Turner (Republican) 61.7%; ▌David Esrati (Democratic) 38.3%
Ohio 11	D+28	Shontel Brown	Democratic	2021 (special)	Incumbent re-elected.	▌ ✓ Shontel Brown (Democratic) 77.8%; ▌Eric Brewer (Republican) 22.2%
Ohio 12	R+18	Troy Balderson	Republican	2018 (special)	Incumbent re-elected.	▌ ✓ Troy Balderson (Republican) 69.3%; ▌Amy Rippel-Elton (Democratic) 30.7%
Ohio 13	R+1	Tim Ryan	Democratic	2002	Incumbent retired to run for U.S. Senate. Democratic hold.	▌ ✓ Emilia Sykes (Democratic) 52.7%; ▌Madison Gesiotto Gilbert (Republican) 47.3%
Ohio 14	R+9	David Joyce	Republican	2012	Incumbent re-elected.	▌ ✓ David Joyce (Republican) 61.7%; ▌Matt Kilboy (Democratic) 38.3%
Ohio 15	R+6	Mike Carey	Republican	2021 (special)	Incumbent re-elected.	▌ ✓ Mike Carey (Republican) 57.0%; ▌Gary Josephson (Democratic) 43.0%

== Oklahoma ==
Oklahoma's results

District		Incumbent			This race	
Location	PVI	Member	Party	First elected	Results	Candidates
Oklahoma 1	R+14	Kevin Hern	Republican	2018	Incumbent re-elected.	▌ ✓ Kevin Hern (Republican) 61.2%; ▌Adam Martin (Democratic) 34.7%; ▌Evelyn Rogers (Independent) 4.2%
Oklahoma 2	R+29	Markwayne Mullin	Republican	2012	Incumbent retired to run for U.S. Senate. Republican hold.	▌ ✓ Josh Brecheen (Republican) 72.4%; ▌Naomi Andrews (Democratic) 23.4%; ▌Ben Robinson (Independent) 4.2%
Oklahoma 3	R+24	Frank Lucas	Republican	1994 (special)	Incumbent re-elected.	▌ ✓ Frank Lucas (Republican) 74.5%; ▌Jeremiah Ross (Democratic) 25.5%
Oklahoma 4	R+19	Tom Cole	Republican	2002	Incumbent re-elected.	▌ ✓ Tom Cole (Republican) 66.8%; ▌Mary Brannon (Democratic) 33.2%
Oklahoma 5	R+12	Stephanie Bice	Republican	2020	Incumbent re-elected.	▌ ✓ Stephanie Bice (Republican) 59.0%; ▌Joshua Harris-Till (Democratic) 37.4%; ▌David Frosch (Independent) 3.6%

== Oregon ==
Oregon's results

Oregon gained its 6th district following the 2020 census.

District		Incumbent			This race	
Location	PVI	Member	Party	First elected	Results	Candidates
Oregon 1	D+18	Suzanne Bonamici	Democratic	2012 (special)	Incumbent re-elected.	▌ ✓ Suzanne Bonamici (Democratic) 68.0%; ▌Christopher Mann (Republican) 32.0%
Oregon 2	R+15	Cliff Bentz	Republican	2020	Incumbent re-elected.	▌ ✓ Cliff Bentz (Republican) 67.6%; ▌Joe Yetter (Democratic) 32.4%
Oregon 3	D+22	Earl Blumenauer	Democratic	1996 (special)	Incumbent re-elected.	▌ ✓ Earl Blumenauer (Democratic) 70.0%; ▌Joanna Harbour (Republican) 26.3%; ▌David Delk (Pacific Green) 3.6%
Oregon 4	D+4	Peter DeFazio	Democratic	1986	Incumbent retired. Democratic hold.	▌ ✓ Val Hoyle (Democratic) 50.6%; ▌Alek Skarlatos (Republican) 43.1%; Others: ▌Levi Leatherberry (Independent) 2.7%; ▌Jim Howard (Constitution) 1.8%; ▌Mike Beilstein (Pacific Green) 1.8%
Oregon 5	D+2	Kurt Schrader	Democratic	2008	Incumbent lost renomination. Republican gain.	▌ ✓ Lori Chavez-DeRemer (Republican) 50.9%; ▌Jamie McLeod-Skinner (Democratic) 48.8%
Oregon 6	D+4	None (new district)			New seat. Democratic gain.	▌ ✓ Andrea Salinas (Democratic) 50.0%; ▌Mike Erickson (Republican) 47.5%; ▌Larry McFarland (Constitution) 2.3%

== Pennsylvania ==
Pennsylvania's results

Pennsylvania lost its 18th district following the 2020 census.

District		Incumbent			This race	
Location	PVI	Member	Party	First elected	Results	Candidates
Pennsylvania 1	EVEN	Brian Fitzpatrick	Republican	2016	Incumbent re-elected.	▌ ✓ Brian Fitzpatrick (Republican) 54.9%; ▌Ashley Ehasz (Democratic) 45.1%
Pennsylvania 2	D+20	Brendan Boyle	Democratic	2014	Incumbent re-elected.	▌ ✓ Brendan Boyle (Democratic) 75.7%; ▌Aaron Bashir (Republican) 24.3%
Pennsylvania 3	D+39	Dwight Evans	Democratic	2016	Incumbent re-elected.	▌ ✓ Dwight Evans (Democratic) 95.1%; ▌Christopher Hoeppner (Socialist Workers) 4.9%
Pennsylvania 4	D+7	Madeleine Dean	Democratic	2018	Incumbent re-elected.	▌ ✓ Madeleine Dean (Democratic) 61.3%; ▌Christian Nascimento (Republican) 38.7%
Pennsylvania 5	D+14	Mary Gay Scanlon	Democratic	2018	Incumbent re-elected.	▌ ✓ Mary Gay Scanlon (Democratic) 65.1%; ▌David Galluch (Republican) 34.9%
Pennsylvania 6	D+5	Chrissy Houlahan	Democratic	2018	Incumbent re-elected.	▌ ✓ Chrissy Houlahan (Democratic) 58.3%; ▌Guy Ciarrocchi (Republican) 41.7%
Pennsylvania 7	R+2	Susan Wild	Democratic	2018	Incumbent re-elected.	▌ ✓ Susan Wild (Democratic) 51.0%; ▌Lisa Scheller (Republican) 49.0%
Pennsylvania 8	R+4	Matt Cartwright	Democratic	2012	Incumbent re-elected.	▌ ✓ Matt Cartwright (Democratic) 51.2%; ▌Jim Bognet (Republican) 48.8%
Pennsylvania 9	R+21	Dan Meuser	Republican	2018	Incumbent re-elected.	▌ ✓ Dan Meuser (Republican) 69.3%; ▌Amanda Waldman (Democratic) 30.7%
Pennsylvania 9	R+21	Fred Keller; Redistricted from the 12th district	Republican	2019 (special)	Incumbent retired. Republican loss.	▌ ✓ Dan Meuser (Republican) 69.3%; ▌Amanda Waldman (Democratic) 30.7%
Pennsylvania 10	R+5	Scott Perry	Republican	2012	Incumbent re-elected.	▌ ✓ Scott Perry (Republican) 53.8%; ▌Shamaine Daniels (Democratic) 46.2%
Pennsylvania 11	R+13	Lloyd Smucker	Republican	2016	Incumbent re-elected.	▌ ✓ Lloyd Smucker (Republican) 61.5%; ▌Bob Hollister (Democratic) 38.5%
Pennsylvania 12	D+8	Mike Doyle; Redistricted from the 18th district	Democratic	1994	Incumbent retired. Democratic hold.	▌ ✓ Summer Lee (Democratic) 56.2%; ▌Mike Doyle (Republican) 43.8%
Pennsylvania 13	R+25	John Joyce	Republican	2018	Incumbent re-elected.	▌ ✓ John Joyce (Republican) 100%
Pennsylvania 14	R+18	Guy Reschenthaler	Republican	2018	Incumbent re-elected.	▌ ✓ Guy Reschenthaler (Republican) 100%
Pennsylvania 15	R+21	Glenn Thompson	Republican	2008	Incumbent re-elected.	▌ ✓ Glenn Thompson (Republican) 69.9%; ▌Mike Molesevich (Democratic) 30.1%
Pennsylvania 16	R+13	Mike Kelly	Republican	2010	Incumbent re-elected.	▌ ✓ Mike Kelly (Republican) 59.4%; ▌Dan Pastore (Democratic) 40.6%
Pennsylvania 17	EVEN	Conor Lamb	Democratic	2018 (special)	Incumbent retired to run for U.S. Senate. Democratic hold.	▌ ✓ Chris Deluzio (Democratic) 53.4%; ▌Jeremy Shaffer (Republican) 46.6%

== Rhode Island ==
Rhode Island's results

District		Incumbent			This race	
Location	PVI	Member	Party	First elected	Results	Candidates
Rhode Island 1	D+12	David Cicilline	Democratic	2010	Incumbent re-elected.	▌ ✓ David Cicilline (Democratic) 64.2%; ▌Allen Waters (Republican) 35.8%
Rhode Island 2	D+4	James Langevin	Democratic	2000	Incumbent retired. Democratic hold.	▌ ✓ Seth Magaziner (Democratic) 50.5%; ▌Allan Fung (Republican) 46.8%; ▌William Gilbert (Moderate) 2.7%

== South Carolina ==
South Carolina's results

District		Incumbent			This race	
Location	PVI	Member	Party	First elected	Results	Candidates
South Carolina 1	R+7	Nancy Mace	Republican	2020	Incumbent re-elected.	▌ ✓ Nancy Mace (Republican) 56.5%; ▌Annie Andrews (Democratic) 42.5%; ▌Joseph Oddo (Alliance) 1.0%
South Carolina 2	R+8	Joe Wilson	Republican	2001 (special)	Incumbent re-elected.	▌ ✓ Joe Wilson (Republican) 60.1%; ▌Judd Larkins (Democratic) 39.9%
South Carolina 3	R+21	Jeff Duncan	Republican	2010	Incumbent re-elected.	▌ ✓ Jeff Duncan (Republican) 100%
South Carolina 4	R+12	William Timmons	Republican	2018	Incumbent re-elected.	▌ ✓ William Timmons (Republican) 100%
South Carolina 5	R+12	Ralph Norman	Republican	2017 (special)	Incumbent re-elected.	▌ ✓ Ralph Norman (Republican) 64.0%; ▌Evangeline Hundley (Democratic) 34.5%; ▌Larry Gaither (Green) 1.5%
South Carolina 6	D+14	Jim Clyburn	Democratic	1992	Incumbent re-elected.	▌ ✓ Jim Clyburn (Democratic) 62.1%; ▌Duke Buckner (Republican) 37.9%
South Carolina 7	R+11	Tom Rice	Republican	2012	Incumbent lost renomination. Republican hold.	▌ ✓ Russell Fry (Republican) 64.9%; ▌Daryl Scott (Democratic) 35.1%

== South Dakota ==
South Dakota's results

District		Incumbent			This race	
Location	PVI	Member	Party	First elected	Results	Candidates
South Dakota at-large	R+16	Dusty Johnson	Republican	2018	Incumbent re-elected.	▌ ✓ Dusty Johnson (Republican) 77.4%; ▌Collin Duprel (Libertarian) 22.6%

== Tennessee ==
Tennessee's results

District		Incumbent			This race	
Location	PVI	Member	Party	First elected	Results	Candidates
Tennessee 1	R+30	Diana Harshbarger	Republican	2020	Incumbent re-elected.	▌ ✓ Diana Harshbarger (Republican) 78.3%; ▌Cameron Parsons (Democratic) 19.7%; Others: ▌Richard Baker (Independent) 1.3%; ▌Matt Makrom (Independent) 0.7%
Tennessee 2	R+18	Tim Burchett	Republican	2018	Incumbent re-elected.	▌ ✓ Tim Burchett (Republican) 67.9%; ▌Mark Harmon (Democratic) 32.1%
Tennessee 3	R+19	Chuck Fleischmann	Republican	2010	Incumbent re-elected.	▌ ✓ Chuck Fleischmann (Republican) 68.4%; ▌Meg Gorman (Democratic) 30.2%; Others: ▌Rick Tyler (Independent) 0.9%; ▌Thomas Rumba (Independent) 0.6%
Tennessee 4	R+22	Scott DesJarlais	Republican	2010	Incumbent re-elected.	▌ ✓ Scott DesJarlais (Republican) 70.6%; ▌Wayne Steele (Democratic) 25.7%; Others: ▌Mike Winton (Independent) 1.6%; ▌Clyde Benson (Independent) 1.0%; ▌David Jones (Libertarian) 0.4%; ▌Tharon Chandler (Independent) 0.3%; ▌Joseph Magyer (Independent) 0.3%
Tennessee 5	R+9	Jim Cooper	Democratic	1982; 1994 (retired); 2002	Incumbent retired. Republican gain.	▌ ✓ Andy Ogles (Republican) 55.8%; ▌Heidi Campbell (Democratic) 42.3%; Others: ▌Derrick Brantley (Independent) 0.9%; ▌Daniel Cooper (Independent) 0.5%; ▌Rick Shannon (Independent) 0.4%
Tennessee 6	R+17	John Rose	Republican	2018	Incumbent re-elected.	▌ ✓ John Rose (Republican) 66.3%; ▌Randal Cooper (Democratic) 33.7%
Tennessee 7	R+10	Mark Green	Republican	2018	Incumbent re-elected.	▌ ✓ Mark Green (Republican) 60.0%; ▌Odessa Kelly (Democratic) 38.1%; ▌Steven Hooper (independent) 1.9%
Tennessee 8	R+21	David Kustoff	Republican	2016	Incumbent re-elected.	▌ ✓ David Kustoff (Republican) 74.0%; ▌Lynnette Williams (Democratic) 24.3%
Tennessee 9	D+22	Steve Cohen	Democratic	2006	Incumbent re-elected.	▌ ✓ Steve Cohen (Democratic) 70.0%; ▌Charlotte Bergmann (Republican) 26.2%; Others: ▌George Flinn (Independent) 2.5%; ▌Dennis Clark (Independent) 0.9%; ▌Paul Cook (Independent) 0.4%

== Texas ==
Texas's results

Texas gained its 37th and 38th districts following the 2020 census.

District		Incumbent			This race	
Location	PVI	Member	Party	First elected	Results	Candidates
Texas 1	R+26	Louie Gohmert	Republican	2004	Incumbent retired to run for Texas Attorney General. Republican hold.	▌ ✓ Nathaniel Moran (Republican) 78.1%; ▌Jrmar Jefferson (Democratic) 21.9%
Texas 2	R+15	Dan Crenshaw	Republican	2018	Incumbent re-elected.	▌ ✓ Dan Crenshaw (Republican) 65.9%; ▌Robin Fulford (Democratic) 34.1%
Texas 3	R+11	Van Taylor	Republican	2018	Incumbent withdrew from renomination. Republican hold.	▌ ✓ Keith Self (Republican) 60.5%; ▌Sandeep Srivastava (Democratic) 36.9%; ▌Christopher J. Claytor (Libertarian) 2.5%
Texas 4	R+16	Pat Fallon	Republican	2020	Incumbent re-elected.	▌ ✓ Pat Fallon (Republican) 66.7%; ▌Iro Omere (Democratic) 30.9%; ▌John Simmons (Libertarian) 2.4%
Texas 5	R+14	Lance Gooden	Republican	2018	Incumbent re-elected.	▌ ✓ Lance Gooden (Republican) 64.0%; ▌Tartisha Hill (Democratic) 34.0%; ▌Kevin Hale (Libertarian) 2.0%
Texas 6	R+15	Jake Ellzey	Republican	2021 (special)	Incumbent re-elected.	▌ ✓ Jake Ellzey (Republican) 100%
Texas 7	D+13	Lizzie Fletcher	Democratic	2018	Incumbent re-elected.	▌ ✓ Lizzie Fletcher (Democratic) 63.8%; ▌Johnny Teague (Republican) 36.2%
Texas 8	R+16	Kevin Brady	Republican	1996	Incumbent retired. Republican hold.	▌ ✓ Morgan Luttrell (Republican) 68.1%; ▌Laura Jones (Democratic) 30.5%; ▌Roy Eriksen (Libertarian) 1.4%
Texas 9	D+26	Al Green	Democratic	2004	Incumbent re-elected.	▌ ✓ Al Green (Democratic) 76.7%; ▌Jimmy Leon (Republican) 23.3%
Texas 10	R+13	Michael McCaul	Republican	2004	Incumbent re-elected.	▌ ✓ Michael McCaul (Republican) 63.3%; ▌Linda Nuno (Democratic) 34.3%; ▌Bill Kelsey (Libertarian) 2.4%
Texas 11	R+23	August Pfluger	Republican	2020	Incumbent re-elected.	▌ ✓ August Pfluger (Republican) 100%
Texas 12	R+12	Kay Granger	Republican	1996	Incumbent re-elected.	▌ ✓ Kay Granger (Republican) 64.3%; ▌Trey Hunt (Democratic) 35.7%
Texas 13	R+26	Ronny Jackson	Republican	2020	Incumbent re-elected.	▌ ✓ Ronny Jackson (Republican) 75.4%; ▌Kathleen Brown (Democratic) 24.6%
Texas 14	R+17	Randy Weber	Republican	2012	Incumbent re-elected.	▌ ✓ Randy Weber (Republican) 70.2%; ▌Mikal Williams (Democratic) 29.8%
Texas 15	R+1	None (new district)			New seat. Republican gain.	▌ ✓ Monica De La Cruz (Republican) 53.3%; ▌Michelle Vallejo (Democratic) 44.8%; ▌Ross Lynn Leone (Libertarian) 1.9%
Texas 16	D+17	Veronica Escobar	Democratic	2018	Incumbent re-elected.	▌ ✓ Veronica Escobar (Democratic) 63.5%; ▌Irene Armendariz-Jackson (Republican) 36.5%
Texas 17	R+14	Pete Sessions	Republican	1996; 2018 (lost); 2020	Incumbent re-elected.	▌ ✓ Pete Sessions (Republican) 66.5%; ▌Mary Jo Woods (Democratic) 33.5%
Texas 18	D+23	Sheila Jackson Lee	Democratic	1994	Incumbent re-elected.	▌ ✓ Sheila Jackson Lee (Democratic) 70.7%; ▌Carmen María Montiel (Republican) 26.2%; Others: ▌Vince Duncan (Independent) 1.8%; ▌Phil Kurtz (Libertarian) 1.3%
Texas 19	R+26	Jodey Arrington	Republican	2016	Incumbent re-elected.	▌ ✓ Jodey Arrington (Republican) 80.3%; ▌Nathan Lewis (Independent) 19.7%
Texas 20	D+15	Joaquin Castro	Democratic	2012	Incumbent re-elected.	▌ ✓ Joaquin Castro (Democratic) 68.4%; ▌Kyle Sinclair (Republican) 31.6%
Texas 21	R+13	Chip Roy	Republican	2018	Incumbent re-elected.	▌ ✓ Chip Roy (Republican) 62.8%; ▌Claudia Zapata (Democratic) 37.2%
Texas 22	R+11	Troy Nehls	Republican	2020	Incumbent re-elected.	▌ ✓ Troy Nehls (Republican) 62.2%; ▌Jamie Jordan (Democratic) 35.5%; ▌Joseph LeBlanc Jr. (Libertarian) 2.2%
Texas 23	R+5	Tony Gonzales	Republican	2020	Incumbent re-elected.	▌ ✓ Tony Gonzales (Republican) 55.9%; ▌John Lira (Democratic) 38.8%; ▌Frank Lopez (Independent) 5.4%
Texas 24	R+10	Beth Van Duyne	Republican	2020	Incumbent re-elected.	▌ ✓ Beth Van Duyne (Republican) 59.7%; ▌Jan McDowell (Democratic) 40.3%
Texas 25	R+19	Roger Williams	Republican	2012	Incumbent re-elected.	▌ ✓ Roger Williams (Republican) 100%
Texas 26	R+13	Michael C. Burgess	Republican	2002	Incumbent re-elected.	▌ ✓ Michael C. Burgess (Republican) 69.3%; ▌Mike Kolls (Libertarian) 30.7%
Texas 27	R+13	Michael Cloud	Republican	2018 (special)	Incumbent re-elected.	▌ ✓ Michael Cloud (Republican) 64.4%; ▌Maclovio Pérez (Democratic) 35.6%
Texas 28	D+3	Henry Cuellar	Democratic	2004	Incumbent re-elected.	▌ ✓ Henry Cuellar (Democratic) 56.7%; ▌Cassy Garcia (Republican) 43.3%
Texas 29	D+18	Sylvia Garcia	Democratic	2018	Incumbent re-elected.	▌ ✓ Sylvia Garcia (Democratic) 71.4%; ▌Robert Schafranek (Republican) 28.6%
Texas 30	D+27	Eddie Bernice Johnson	Democratic	1992	Incumbent retired. Democratic hold.	▌ ✓ Jasmine Crockett (Democratic) 75.0%; ▌James Rodgers (Republican) 21.8%; ▌Zachariah Manning (Independent) 2.1%; ▌Phil Gray (Libertarian) 1.0%
Texas 31	R+14	John Carter	Republican	2002	Incumbent re-elected.	▌ ✓ John Carter (Republican) 100%
Texas 32	D+14	Colin Allred	Democratic	2018	Incumbent re-elected.	▌ ✓ Colin Allred (Democratic) 65.4%; ▌Antonio Swad (Republican) 34.6%
Texas 33	D+24	Marc Veasey	Democratic	2012	Incumbent re-elected.	▌ ✓ Marc Veasey (Democratic) 72.0%; ▌Patrick Gillespie (Republican) 25.6%; ▌Ken Ashby (Libertarian) 2.4%
Texas 34	D+9	Mayra Flores	Republican	2022 (special)	Incumbent lost re-election. Republican loss.	▌ ✓ Vicente Gonzalez (Democratic) 52.7%; ▌Mayra Flores (Republican) 44.2%; ▌Chris Royal (Independent) 3.0%
Texas 34	D+9	Vicente Gonzalez; Redistricted from the 15th district	Democratic	2016	Incumbent re-elected.	▌ ✓ Vicente Gonzalez (Democratic) 52.7%; ▌Mayra Flores (Republican) 44.2%; ▌Chris Royal (Independent) 3.0%
Texas 35	D+21	None (new district)			New seat. Democratic gain.	▌ ✓ Greg Casar (Democratic) 72.6%; ▌Dan McQueen (Republican) 27.4%
Texas 36	R+18	Brian Babin	Republican	2014	Incumbent re-elected.	▌ ✓ Brian Babin (Republican) 69.5%; ▌Jon Haire (Democratic) 30.5%
Texas 37	D+24	Lloyd Doggett; Redistricted from the 35th district	Democratic	1994	Incumbent re-elected.	▌ ✓ Lloyd Doggett (Democratic) 76.8%; ▌Jenny Garcia Sharon (Republican) 21.0%; ▌Clark Patterson (Libertarian) 2.2%
Texas 38	R+12	None (new district)			New seat. Republican gain.	▌ ✓ Wesley Hunt (Republican) 63.0%; ▌Duncan Klussmann (Democratic) 35.5%; ▌Joel Dejean (Independent) 1.5%

== Utah ==
Utah's results

District		Incumbent			This race	
Location	PVI	Member	Party	First elected	Results	Candidates
Utah 1	R+12	Blake Moore	Republican	2020	Incumbent re-elected.	▌ ✓ Blake Moore (Republican) 67.0%; ▌Rick Jones (Democratic) 33.0%
Utah 2	R+11	Chris Stewart	Republican	2012	Incumbent re-elected.	▌ ✓ Chris Stewart (Republican) 59.7%; ▌Nick Mitchell (Democratic) 34.0%; ▌Jay McFarland (United Utah) 3.3%; ▌Cassie Easley (Constitution) 3.0%
Utah 3	R+13	John Curtis	Republican	2017 (special)	Incumbent re-elected.	▌ ✓ John Curtis (Republican) 64.4%; ▌Glenn Wright (Democratic) 29.5%; ▌Michael Stoddard (Libertarian) 2.9%; ▌Daniel Cummings (Constitution) 1.7%; ▌Aaron Heineman (Independent American) 1.4%
Utah 4	R+16	Burgess Owens	Republican	2020	Incumbent re-elected.	▌ ✓ Burgess Owens (Republican) 61.1%; ▌Darlene McDonald (Democratic) 32.4%; ▌January Walker (United Utah) 6.6%

== Vermont ==
Vermont's results

District		Incumbent			This race	
Location	PVI	Member	Party	First elected	Results	Candidates
Vermont at-large	D+16	Peter Welch	Democratic	2006	Incumbent retired to run for U.S. Senate. Democratic hold.	▌ ✓ Becca Balint (Democratic) 62.8%; ▌Liam Madden (Republican) (Note: Madden remained the Republican nominee despite the Vermont Republican Party disavowing his campaign.) 27.9%; Others: ▌Ericka Redic (Libertarian) 4.5%; ▌Matt Druzba (Independent) 2.0%; ▌Luke Talbot (Independent) 1.6%; ▌Adam Ortiz (Independent) 1.2%

== Virginia ==
Virginia's results

District		Incumbent			This race	
Location	PVI	Member	Party	First elected	Results	Candidates
Virginia 1	R+6	Rob Wittman	Republican	2007 (special)	Incumbent re-elected.	▌ ✓ Rob Wittman (Republican) 56.0%; ▌Herb Jones (Democratic) 43.0%; ▌David Foster (Independent) 1.0%
Virginia 2	R+2	Elaine Luria	Democratic	2018	Incumbent lost re-election. Republican gain.	▌ ✓ Jen Kiggans (Republican) 51.7%; ▌Elaine Luria (Democratic) 48.3%
Virginia 3	D+17	Bobby Scott	Democratic	1992	Incumbent re-elected.	▌ ✓ Bobby Scott (Democratic) 67.4%; ▌Terry Namkung (Republican) 32.6%
Virginia 4	D+16	Donald McEachin	Democratic	2016	Incumbent re-elected but died on November 28, 2022.	▌ ✓ Donald McEachin (Democratic) 64.4%; ▌Leon Benjamin (Republican) 35.6%
Virginia 5	R+7	Bob Good	Republican	2020	Incumbent re-elected.	▌ ✓ Bob Good (Republican) 57.7%; ▌Josh Throneburg (Democratic) 42.3%
Virginia 6	R+14	Ben Cline	Republican	2018	Incumbent re-elected.	▌ ✓ Ben Cline (Republican) 64.5%; ▌Jennifer Lewis (Democratic) 35.5%
Virginia 7	D+1	Abigail Spanberger	Democratic	2018	Incumbent re-elected.	▌ ✓ Abigail Spanberger (Democratic) 52.3%; ▌Yesli Vega (Republican) 47.7%
Virginia 8	D+26	Don Beyer	Democratic	2014	Incumbent re-elected.	▌ ✓ Don Beyer (Democratic) 73.7%; ▌Karina Lipsman (Republican) 24.8%; ▌Teddy Fikre (Independent) 1.5%
Virginia 9	R+23	Morgan Griffith	Republican	2010	Incumbent re-elected.	▌ ✓ Morgan Griffith (Republican) 73.4%; ▌Taysha DeVaughan (Democratic) 26.6%
Virginia 10	D+6	Jennifer Wexton	Democratic	2018	Incumbent re-elected.	▌ ✓ Jennifer Wexton (Democratic) 53.3%; ▌Hung Cao (Republican) 46.7%
Virginia 11	D+18	Gerry Connolly	Democratic	2008	Incumbent re-elected.	▌ ✓ Gerry Connolly (Democratic) 66.9%; ▌James Myles (Republican) 33.1%

== Washington ==
Washington's results

District		Incumbent			This race	
Location	PVI	Member	Party	First elected	Results	Candidates
Washington 1	D+13	Suzan DelBene	Democratic	2012 (special)	Incumbent re-elected.	▌ ✓ Suzan DelBene (Democratic) 63.5%; ▌Vincent Cavaleri (Republican) 36.4%
Washington 2	D+9	Rick Larsen	Democratic	2000	Incumbent re-elected.	▌ ✓ Rick Larsen (Democratic) 60.1%; ▌Dan Matthews (Republican) 39.8%
Washington 3	R+5	Jaime Herrera Beutler	Republican	2010	Incumbent did not advance to the general election. Democratic gain.	▌ ✓ Marie Gluesenkamp Perez (Democratic) 50.4%; ▌Joe Kent (Republican) 49.6%
Washington 4	R+11	Dan Newhouse	Republican	2014	Incumbent re-elected.	▌ ✓ Dan Newhouse (Republican) 66.5%; ▌Doug White (Democratic) 31.2%
Washington 5	R+8	Cathy McMorris Rodgers	Republican	2004	Incumbent re-elected.	▌ ✓ Cathy McMorris Rodgers (Republican) 59.5%; ▌Natasha Hill (Democratic) 40.3%
Washington 6	D+6	Derek Kilmer	Democratic	2012	Incumbent re-elected.	▌ ✓ Derek Kilmer (Democratic) 60.0%; ▌Elizabeth Kreiselmaier (Republican) 39.9%
Washington 7	D+36	Pramila Jayapal	Democratic	2016	Incumbent re-elected.	▌ ✓ Pramila Jayapal (Democratic) 85.4%; ▌Cliff Moon (Republican) 14.2%
Washington 8	D+1	Kim Schrier	Democratic	2018	Incumbent re-elected.	▌ ✓ Kim Schrier (Democratic) 53.3%; ▌Matt Larkin (Republican) 46.4%
Washington 9	D+21	Adam Smith	Democratic	1996	Incumbent re-elected.	▌ ✓ Adam Smith (Democratic) 71.6%; ▌Doug Basler (Republican) 28.2%
Washington 10	D+7	Marilyn Strickland	Democratic	2020	Incumbent re-elected.	▌ ✓ Marilyn Strickland (Democratic) 57.0%; ▌Keith Swank (Republican) 42.9%

== West Virginia ==
West Virginia's results

West Virginia lost its 3rd district following the 2020 census.

District		Incumbent			This race	
Location	PVI	Member	Party	First elected	Results	Candidates
West Virginia 1	R+23	Carol Miller; Redistricted from the 3rd district	Republican	2018	Incumbent re-elected.	▌ ✓ Carol Miller (Republican) 66.7%; ▌Lacy Watson (Democratic) 28.8%; ▌Belinda Fox-Spencer (Independent) 4.5%
West Virginia 2	R+22	Alex Mooney	Republican	2014	Incumbent re-elected.	▌ ✓ Alex Mooney (Republican) 65.6%; ▌Barry Lee Wendell (Democratic) 34.4%
West Virginia 2	R+22	David McKinley; Redistricted from the 1st district	Republican	2010	Incumbent lost renomination. Republican loss.	▌ ✓ Alex Mooney (Republican) 65.6%; ▌Barry Lee Wendell (Democratic) 34.4%

== Wisconsin ==
Wisconsin's results

District		Incumbent			This race	
Location	PVI	Member	Party	First elected	Results	Candidates
Wisconsin 1	R+3	Bryan Steil	Republican	2018	Incumbent re-elected.	▌ ✓ Bryan Steil (Republican) 54.1%; ▌Ann Roe (Democratic) 45.2%; ▌Charles Barman (Going Away) 0.7%
Wisconsin 2	D+19	Mark Pocan	Democratic	2012	Incumbent re-elected.	▌ ✓ Mark Pocan (Democratic) 71.0%; ▌Erik Olsen (Republican) 26.9%; ▌Douglas Alexander (Independent) 2.0%
Wisconsin 3	R+4	Ron Kind	Democratic	1996	Incumbent retired. Republican gain.	▌ ✓ Derrick Van Orden (Republican) 51.9%; ▌Brad Pfaff (Democratic) 48.1%
Wisconsin 4	D+25	Gwen Moore	Democratic	2004	Incumbent re-elected.	▌ ✓ Gwen Moore (Democratic) 75.3%; ▌Tim Rogers (Republican) 22.6%; ▌Robert Raymond (Independent) 2.0%
Wisconsin 5	R+14	Scott Fitzgerald	Republican	2020	Incumbent re-elected.	▌ ✓ Scott Fitzgerald (Republican) 64.4%; ▌Mike Van Someren (Democratic) 35.6%
Wisconsin 6	R+10	Glenn Grothman	Republican	2014	Incumbent re-elected.	▌ ✓ Glenn Grothman (Republican) 94.9%
Wisconsin 7	R+12	Tom Tiffany	Republican	2020 (special)	Incumbent re-elected.	▌ ✓ Tom Tiffany (Republican) 61.9%; ▌Richard Ausman (Democratic) 38.1%
Wisconsin 8	R+10	Mike Gallagher	Republican	2016	Incumbent re-elected.	▌ ✓ Mike Gallagher (Republican) 73.5%; ▌Paul Boucher (Independent) 16.0%; ▌Jacob VandenPlas (Libertarian) 10.5%

== Wyoming ==
Wyoming's results

District		Incumbent			This race	
Location	PVI	Member	Party	First elected	Results	Candidates
Wyoming at-large	R+25	Liz Cheney	Republican	2016	Incumbent lost renomination. Republican hold.	▌ ✓ Harriet Hageman (Republican) 69.8%; ▌Lynnette Grey Bull (Democratic) 24.9%; ▌Richard Brubaker (Libertarian) 2.9%; ▌Marissa Selvig (Constitution) 2.4%

== Non-voting delegates ==
=== American Samoa ===
District	Incumbent			This race	
District	Delegate	Party	First elected	Results	Candidates
American Samoa at-large	Amata Coleman Radewagen	Republican	2014	Incumbent re-elected.	▌ ✓ Amata Coleman Radewagen (Republican)

=== District of Columbia ===
District		Incumbent			This race	
Location	PVI	Delegate	Party	First elected	Results	Candidates
District of Columbia at-large	D+43	Eleanor Holmes Norton	Democratic	1990	Incumbent re-elected.	▌ ✓ Eleanor Holmes Norton (Democratic) 87.2%; ▌Nelson Rimensnyder (Republican) 5.9%; ▌Natale Stracuzzi (DC Statehood Green) 4.9%; ▌Bruce Majors (Libertarian) 2.0%

=== Guam ===
District	Incumbent			This race	
District	Delegate	Party	First elected	Results	Candidates
Guam at-large	Michael San Nicolas	Democratic	2018	Incumbent retired to run for governor of Guam. Republican gain.	▌ ✓ James Moylan (Republican) 52.2%; ▌Judith Won Pat (Democratic) 47.2%

=== Northern Mariana Islands ===
District	Incumbent			This race	
District	Delegate	Party	First elected	Results	Candidates
Northern Mariana Islands at-large	Gregorio Sablan	Democratic	2008 (Note: Sablan was first elected as an Independent. He became a Democrat in October 2021.)	Incumbent re-elected.	▌ ✓ Gregorio Sablan (Democratic)

=== United States Virgin Islands ===
District	Incumbent			This race	
District	Delegate	Party	First elected	Results	Candidates
U.S. Virgin Islands at-large	Stacey Plaskett	Democratic	2014	Incumbent re-elected.	▌ ✓ Stacey Plaskett (Democratic)

== See also ==
- 2022 United States elections
  - 2022 United States Senate elections
  - 2022 United States gubernatorial elections
- 117th United States Congress
- 118th United States Congress
