= 2022 Nebraska's 1st congressional district special election =

- June 28, 2022

Nebraska's 1st congressional district
- Turnout: 28.44%
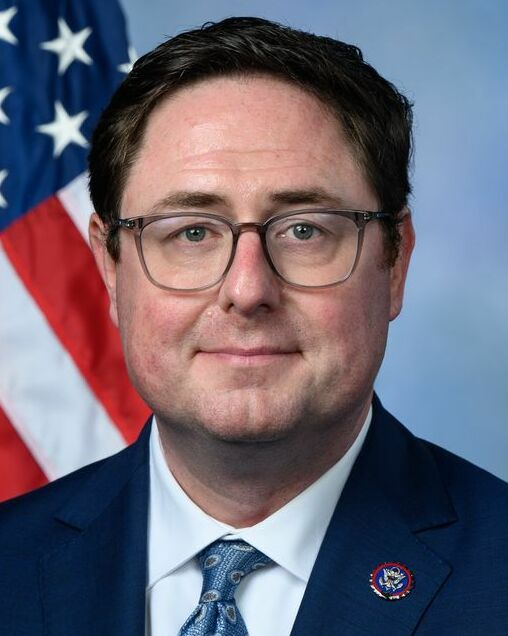

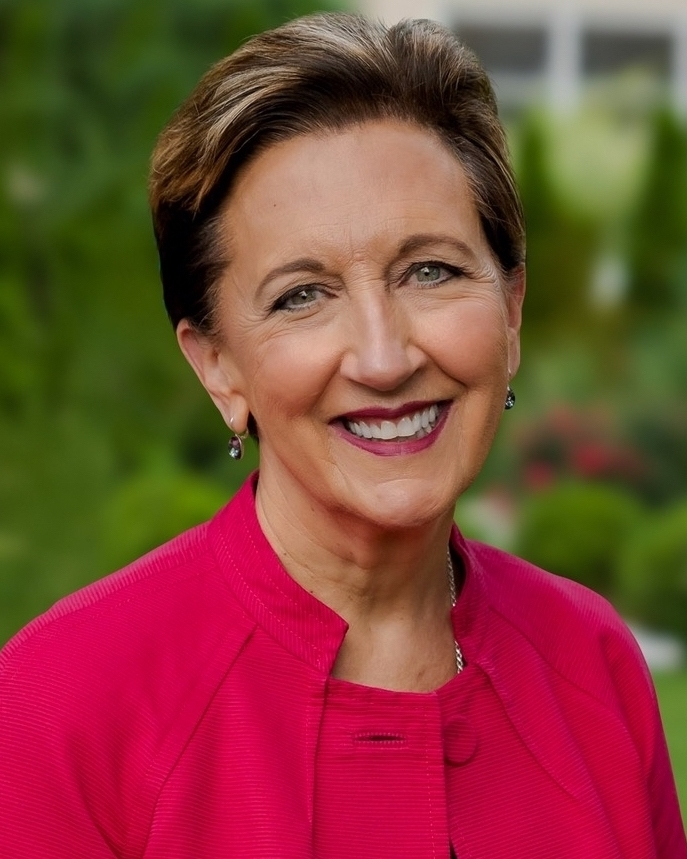
Nominee	Mike Flood	Patty Pansing Brooks
Party	Republican	Democratic
Popular vote	61,017	54,783
Percentage	52.69%	47.31%
- County results Flood: 50–60% 60–70% 80–90% Brooks: 50–60%
U.S. Representative before election
Jeff Fortenberry
Republican
Elected U.S. Representative
Mike Flood
Republican

The 2022 Nebraska's 1st congressional district special election, which was held on June 28, 2022, was triggered when Republican representative Jeff Fortenberry resigned on March 31, having been convicted of lying to the FBI about campaign contributions.

Under Nebraska state law, major party nominees for special elections are selected by the party through its executive committee or party convention, with the special election scheduled by Governor Pete Ricketts within 90 days after the seat's vacancy.

The election came under some controversy over the discovery that it would be held in the new post-2020 redistricting Nebraska's 1st congressional district. While some Nebraska officials claimed that the new map took immediate effect when signed, this was not in line with congressional rules which only recognized pre-2020 redistricting boundaries for the rest of 2022. It also caused confusion among Nebraska residents wanting to vote in the election or receive constituent services, especially as congressional funds are not allowed to be spent outside the recognized old district boundaries.

Against a backdrop of the Dobbs v. Jackson Women's Health Organization ruling four days before the election which overturned the landmark Roe v. Wade case on abortion, Republican nominee Mike Flood promoted his sponsorship of a 2010 Nebraska state law which banned abortions 20 weeks after fertilization in a campaign ad. Meanwhile, Democrat Patty Pansing Brooks highlighted her support for abortion rights, criticizing the Dobbs decision as an "assault on privacy" and "a step backward in American culture", and remarked that the election was the first instance where "we can fight back at the ballot box".

After a campaign described by the Norfolk Daily News as "mostly positive" with "lighthearted" ads, Flood declared victory at 10:23 pm CDT, two hours after polls closed, promising to fight inflation, for which he blamed the policies of the Biden administration.

In light of the competitiveness of the election, (early results had shown Flood trailing Pansing Brooks) Nebraska Democratic Party chair Jane Kleeb released a statement that the national Democratic Party needed to invest more in rural areas considered to be "unwinnable" and that Pansing Brooks "connected with voters".

Flood won a full term in November 2022 in a rematch with Pansing Brooks.

== Candidates ==
The Democratic and Republican nominees were selected by their respective party's executive committee on April 5 and April 9, respectively. Mike Flood defeated John Glen Weaver through the party's secret ballot 24 to Weaver's 5 votes.

=== Nominees ===
- Patty Pansing Brooks (Democratic), state senator
- Mike Flood (Republican), state senator (2005–2013, 2021–2022), former speaker of the Nebraska Legislature (2007–2013), and candidate for governor in 2014

== General election ==
=== Endorsements ===
Mike Flood (R)

U.S. Senators

- Deb Fischer, U.S. Senator from Nebraska (2013–present)

U.S. Representatives

- Don Bacon, U.S. Representative for Nebraska's 2nd congressional district (2017–present)
- Tom Osborne, former U.S. Representative for Nebraska's 3rd congressional district (2001–2007)
- Adrian Smith, U.S. Representative for Nebraska's 3rd congressional district (2007–present)

State governors

- Dave Heineman, 39th governor of Nebraska (2005–2015)
- Pete Ricketts, 40th governor of Nebraska (2015–2023)

Organizations

- Americans for Prosperity
- National Right to Life Committee
- United States Chamber of Commerce
Patty Pansing Brooks (D)

U.S. Senators

- Bob Kerrey, former U.S. Senator from Nebraska (1989–2001) and 35th governor of Nebraska (1983–1987)
- Ben Nelson, former U.S. Senator from Nebraska (2001–2013) and 37th governor of Nebraska (1991–1999); U.S. Representatives

U.S. Representatives

- John Joseph Cavanaugh III, former U.S. Representative for Nebraska's 2nd congressional district (1977–1981)

State officials

- Maxine Moul, 34th lieutenant governor of Nebraska (1991–1993)
- Kim Robak, 35th lieutenant governor of Nebraska (1993–1999)

State legislators

- Roy Baker, former state senator (2015–2019)
- Carol Blood, state senator (2017–present) and gubernatorial nominee in 2022
- John Cavanaugh, state senator (2021–present)
- Machaela Cavanaugh, state senator (2019–present)
- Danielle Conrad, former state senator (2007–2015)
- Al Davis, former state senator (2013–2017)
- Jen Day, state senator (2021–present)
- Ken Haar, former state senator (2009–2017)
- Matt Hansen, state senator (2015–present)
- Megan Hunt, state senator (2019–present)
- Steve Lathrop, state senator (2007–2015; 2019–present)
- John S. McCollister, state senator (2015–present) (Republican)
- Terrell McKinney, state senator (2021–present)
- Adam Morfeld, state senator (2015–present)
- Dan Quick, former state senator (2017–2021)
- DiAnna Schimek, former state senator (1989–2009)
- Paul Schumacher, former state senator (2011–2019)
- Sandy Scofield, former state senator
- Tony Vargas, state senator (2017–present) and nominee for Nebraska's 2nd congressional district in 2022
- Lynne Walz, state senator (2017–present)
- Bob Wickersham, former state senator (1991–2001)

Municipal officials

- Leirion Gaylor Baird, incumbent mayor of Lincoln (2019–present)
- Tanya Cook, member of Metropolitan Utilities District Board of Directors Subdivision 5 (2020–present) and former state senator (2009–2017)
- Jane Raybould, Lincoln City Councilwoman, former Lancaster County Commissioner and nominee for lieutenant governor in 2014 and governor in 2018
- Don Wesely, former mayor of Lincoln (1999–2003)

Individuals

- Chuck Hassebrook, Executive Director of the Center for Rural Affairs, former Regent of the University of Nebraska, candidate for the U.S. Senate in 2012 and nominee for governor in 2014
- Susanne Shore, wife of Governor Pete Ricketts

Labor unions

- Nebraska State AFL–CIO
- Nebraska State Education Association

Organizations

- Planned Parenthood Action Fund
- Sierra Club Nebraska chapter

=== Predictions ===
Source	Ranking	As of
The Cook Political Report	Solid R	April 29, 2022
Sabato's Crystal Ball	Safe R	March 30, 2022
Politico	Solid R	April 5, 2022
RCP	Safe R	June 9, 2022

=== Fundraising ===
Campaign finance reports
Candidate	Amount raised	Amount spent	Cash on hand
Mike Flood (R)	$1,382,863	$1,383,509	$1,090
Patty Pansing Brooks (D)	$1,040,022	$686,027	$353,996
Source: OpenSecrets

=== Results ===
Pansing Brooks's vote share was boosted by a higher-than-expected turnout in Lancaster County, home to state capital Lincoln, where she served as state senator, with the second-highest turnout of all counties. She also came within a five-point margin of winning the suburban Omaha county of Sarpy. Meanwhile, Flood's victory was the result of him winning more rural counties in the district. Pansing Brooks's outperformance of Biden in the district, in spite of being outspent by Flood, prompted some Democratic strategists to paint the results as a moral victory in a "post-Roe" era. In reaction to the results, Flood acknowledged the need for him to increase his support in the Lincoln area and suburban Omaha.

2022 Nebraska's 1st congressional district special election
Party	Candidate	Votes	%	±%
Republican	Mike Flood	61,017	52.69	−6.83
Democratic	Patty Pansing Brooks	54,783	47.31	+9.64
Total votes		115,800	100.00	
Republican hold				

By county

County	Mike Flood Republican		Patty Pansing Brooks Democratic		Margin		Total votes	Turnout
County	#	%	#	%	#	%	Total votes	Turnout
Butler	1,185	82.12	258	17.88	927	64.24	1,443	25.63
Cass	2,753	64.44	1,519	35.56	1,234	28.89	4,272	22.52
Colfax	847	85.30	146	14.70	701	70.60	993	18.93
Cuming	1,164	83.62	228	16.38	936	67.24	1,392	23.91
Dodge	3,440	64.63	1,883	35.37	1,557	29.25	5,323	24.17
Lancaster	31,054	43.04	41,104	56.96	10,050	13.93	72,158	36.09
Madison	4,759	84.36	882	15.64	3,877	68.73	5,641	25.79
Platte	4,379	83.52	864	16.48	3,515	67.04	5,243	25.59
Polk	387	82.52	82	17.48	305	65.04	469	27.41
Sarpy (part)	7,483	52.65	6,729	47.35	754	5.31	14,212	15.75
Seward	1,946	69.06	872	30.94	1,074	38.02	2,818	24.70
Stanton	1,620	88.24	216	11.76	1,404	76.48	1,836	48.46
Totals	61,017	52.69	54,783	47.31	6,234	5.38	115,800	28.44

== See also ==
- 2022 United States House of Representatives elections
- 2022 Nebraska elections
- 2022 United States elections
- 117th United States Congress
- List of special elections to the United States House of Representatives
