= 2022 United States House of Representatives elections in Nebraska =

- November 8, 2022

All 3 Nebraska seats to the United States House of Representatives
| | Majority party | Minority party |
|---|---|---|
| Party | Republican | Democratic |
| Last election | 3 | 0 |
| Seats won | 3 | 0 |
| Seat change | Steady | Steady |
| Popular vote | 411,034 | 231,511 |
| Percentage | 62.71% | 35.32% |
| Swing | ▲0.54% | ▲0.69% |

Republican
50–60%
60–70%
70–80%
80–90%
>90%
Democratic
50–60%

The 2022 United States House of Representatives elections in Nebraska were held on November 8, 2022, to elect the three U.S. representatives from the state of Nebraska, one from each of the state's three congressional districts. The elections coincided with the Nebraska gubernatorial election, as well as other elections to the U.S. House of Representatives, elections to the U.S. Senate, and various state and local elections.

Nebraska's primary elections took place on May 10, 2022.

== Overview ==
| District | Republican | | Democratic | | Others | | Total | | Result |
| District | Votes | % | Votes | % | Votes | % | Votes | % | Result |
|---|---|---|---|---|---|---|---|---|---|
| District 1 | 129,236 | 57.91% | 93,929 | 42.09% | 0 | 0.00% | 223,165 | 100.0% | Republican hold |
| District 2 | 112,663 | 51.33% | 106,807 | 48.67% | 0 | 0.00% | 219,470 | 100.0% | Republican hold |
| District 3 | 172,700 | 78.30% | 34,836 | 15.79% | 13,016 | 5.90% | 220,552 | 100.0% | Republican hold |
| Total | 411,034 | 62.71% | 231,511 | 35.32% | 13,016 | 1.96% | 663,187 | 100.0% | |

Popular vote
| Republican | 62.71% |
| Democratic | 35.32% |
| Other | 1.96% |

House seats
| Republican | 100.00% |

== District 1 ==
2022 Nebraska's 1st congressional district election
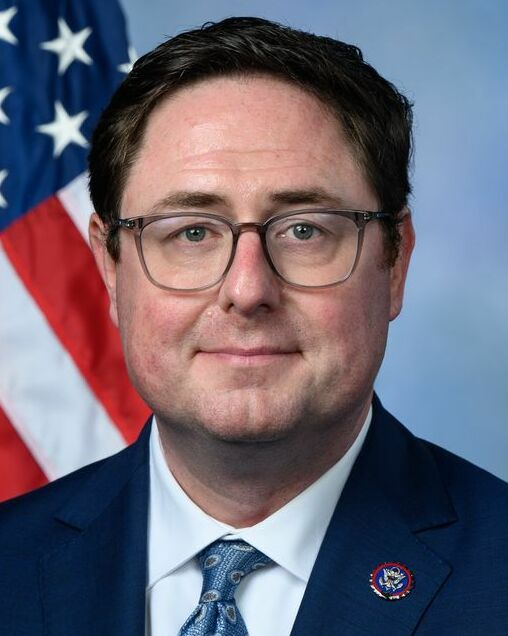

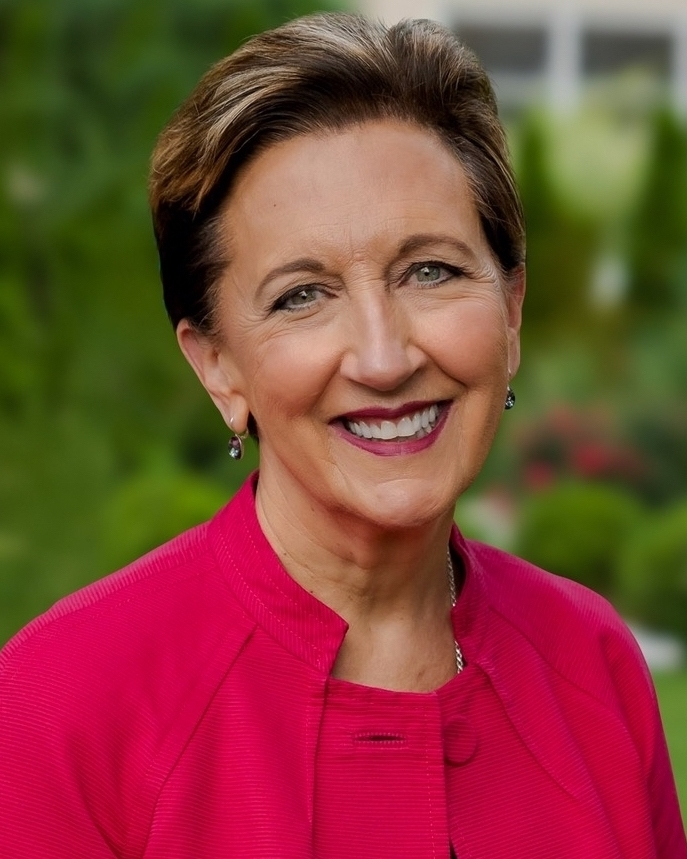
| Nominee | Mike Flood | Patty Pansing Brooks |
| Party | Republican | Democratic |
| Popular vote | 129,236 | 93,929 |
| Percentage | 57.9% | 42.1% |
- County results Flood: 50–60% 60–70% 70–80% 80–90% Pansing Brooks: 50–60%
U.S. Representative before election
Mike Flood
Republican
Elected U.S. Representative
Mike Flood
Republican

The 1st district is located in eastern Nebraska surrounding Omaha and its suburbs, taking in Lincoln, Bellevue, Fremont, and Norfolk. The incumbent was Republican Mike Flood, who was elected with 52.7% of the vote in a 2022 special election after the previous incumbent, Jeff Fortenberry, resigned March 31, 2022, after having been indicted and convicted on charges of lying to the FBI about campaign donations.

=== Republican primary ===
==== Candidates ====
===== Nominee =====
- Mike Flood, incumbent U.S. representative

===== Eliminated in primary =====
- Thireena Yuki Connely, teacher
- Curtis D. Huffman, welder
- John Glen Weaver, U.S. Air Force veteran

===== Withdrawn =====
- Jeff Fortenberry, former U.S. representative and convicted felon

===== Declined =====
- Mike Foley, lieutenant governor of Nebraska, former Nebraska State Auditor, and candidate for governor in 2014 (running for state auditor)
- Tony Fulton, Nebraska Tax Commissioner and former state senator
- Suzanne Geist, state senator
- Mike Hilgers, Speaker of the Nebraska Legislature (running for Attorney General)
- Julie Slama, state senator

==== Endorsements ====
Mike Flood

U.S. senators

- Deb Fischer, U.S. senator from Nebraska (2013–present)

U.S. representatives

- Don Bacon, U.S. representative for Nebraska's 2nd congressional district (2017–present)
- Tom Osborne, former U.S. representative for Nebraska's 3rd congressional district (2001–2007) and former football coach
- Adrian Smith, U.S. representative for Nebraska's 3rd congressional district (2007–present)

State officials

- Dave Heineman, former governor of Nebraska (2005–2015)
- Pete Ricketts, governor of Nebraska (2015–present)

Organizations

- Americans for Prosperity
- National Rifle Association-Political Victory Fund
- National Right to Life Committee
- Nebraska Farm Bureau
- Nebraska Right to Life PAC
- Tea Party Express
Jeff Fortenberry (withdrawn)

State officials

- Mike Foley, lieutenant governor of Nebraska (2015–present)

==== Polling ====
| Poll source | Date(s) administered | Sample size (Note: Key: A – all adults RV – registered voters LV – likely voters V – unclear) | Margin of error | Thireena Yuki Connely | Mike Flood | Jeff Fortenberry | Curtis Huffman | John Glen Weaver | Undecided |
|---|---|---|---|---|---|---|---|---|---|
| | March 31, 2022 | Fortenberry resigns and withdraws from the race | | | | | | | |
| Moore Information Group (R) (Note: This poll was sponsored by Fortenberry's campaign) | February 23, 2022 | 405 (LV) | ± 4.9% | 1% | 25% | 36% | 1% | 1% | 36% |
| Moore Information Group (R) | February 23, 2022 | 405 (LV) | ± 4.9% | – | 30% | 40% | – | – | 30% |
| Moore Information Group (R) | January 2022 | – (LV) | – | – | 33% | 35% | – | – | 33% |

==== Results ====
Republican primary results
| Party | Candidate | Votes | % |
|---|---|---|---|
| Republican | Mike Flood | 61,265 | 73.9 |
| Republican | Jeff Fortenberry (withdrawn) | 9,807 | 11.8 |
| Republican | John Glen Weaver | 5,470 | 6.6 |
| Republican | Thireena Yuki Connely | 3,353 | 4.0 |
| Republican | Curtis Huffman | 3,062 | 3.7 |
| Total votes | | 82,957 | 100.0 |

=== Democratic primary ===
==== Candidates ====
===== Nominee =====
- Patty Pansing Brooks, state senator

===== Eliminated in primary =====
- Jazari Kual, community activist

==== Endorsements ====
Patty Pansing Brooks

U.S. senators

- Bob Kerrey, former U.S. senator from Nebraska (1989–2001) and 35th governor of Nebraska (1983–1987)
- Ben Nelson, former U.S. senator from Nebraska (2001–2013)

U.S. representatives

- John Joseph Cavanaugh III, former U.S. representative for Nebraska's 2nd congressional district (1977–1981)

State officials

- Maxine Moul, 34th lieutenant governor of Nebraska (1991–1993)
- Kim Robak, 35th lieutenant governor of Nebraska (1993–1999)

State legislators

- Roy Baker, former state senator (2015–2019)
- Carol Blood, state senator (2017–present) and nominee for governor of Nebraska in 2022
- John Cavanaugh, state senator (2021–present)
- Machaela Cavanaugh, state senator (2019–present)
- Danielle Conrad, former state senator (2007–2015)
- Al Davis, former state senator (2013–2017)
- Jen Day, state senator (2021–present)
- Ken Haar, former state senator (2009–2017)
- Matt Hansen, state senator (2015–present)
- Megan Hunt, state senator (2019–present)
- Steve Lathrop, state senator (2007–2015; 2019–present)
- John McCollister, state senator (2015–present) (Republican)
- Terrell McKinney, state senator (2021–present)
- Adam Morfeld, state senator (2015–present)
- Dan Quick, former state senator (2007–2021)
- DiAnna Schimek, former state senator (1989–2009)
- Paul Schumacher, former state senator (2011–2019)
- Sandy Scofield, former state senator
- Tony Vargas, state senator (2007–present) and nominee for Nebraska's 2nd congressional district in 2022
- Lynne Walz, state senator (2007–present)
- Bob Wickersham, former state senator (1991–2001)

Local officials

- Leirion Gaylor Baird, incumbent mayor of Lincoln (2019–present)
- Tanya Cook, member of Metropolitan Utilities District Board of Directors Subdivision 5 (2020–present) and former state senator (2009–2017)
- Jane Raybould, Lincoln city councilwoman, former Lancaster County commissioner and nominee for lieutenant governor in 2014 and governor in 2018
- Don Wesely, former mayor of Lincoln (1999–2003)

Individuals

- Chuck Hassebrook, executive director of the Center for Rural Affairs, former regent of the University of Nebraska, candidate for the U.S. Senate in 2012 and nominee for governor in 2014
- Susanne Shore, First Lady of Nebraska (2015–2023)

Labor unions

- International Brotherhood of Electrical Workers Local 265
- Nebraska State AFL–CIO
- Nebraska State Education Association

Organizations

- Planned Parenthood Action Fund
- Sierra Club Nebraska chapter

Newspapers

- Lincoln Journal Star
- Omaha World-Herald

==== Results ====
Democratic primary results
| Party | Candidate | Votes | % |
|---|---|---|---|
| Democratic | Patty Pansing Brooks | 31,808 | 86.6 |
| Democratic | Jazari Kual | 4,944 | 13.4 |
| Total votes | | 36,752 | 100.0 |

=== General election ===
==== Predictions ====
| Source | Ranking | As of |
|---|---|---|
| The Cook Political Report | Solid R | September 1, 2022 |
| Inside Elections | Solid R | September 1, 2022 |
| Sabato's Crystal Ball | Safe R | August 24, 2022 |
| Politico | Likely R | August 23, 2022 |
| RCP | Safe R | September 1, 2022 |
| Fox News | Solid R | August 22, 2022 |
| DDHQ | Solid R | September 5, 2022 |
| FiveThirtyEight | Solid R | September 6, 2022 |
| The Economist | Likely R | September 28, 2022 |

==== Results ====
2022 Nebraska's 1st congressional district election
| Party | Candidate | Votes | % |
|---|---|---|---|
| Republican | Mike Flood (incumbent) | 129,236 | 57.9 |
| Democratic | Patty Pansing Brooks | 93,929 | 42.1 |
| Total votes | | 223,165 | 100.0 |
| Republican hold | | | |

== District 2 ==
2022 Nebraska's 2nd congressional district election
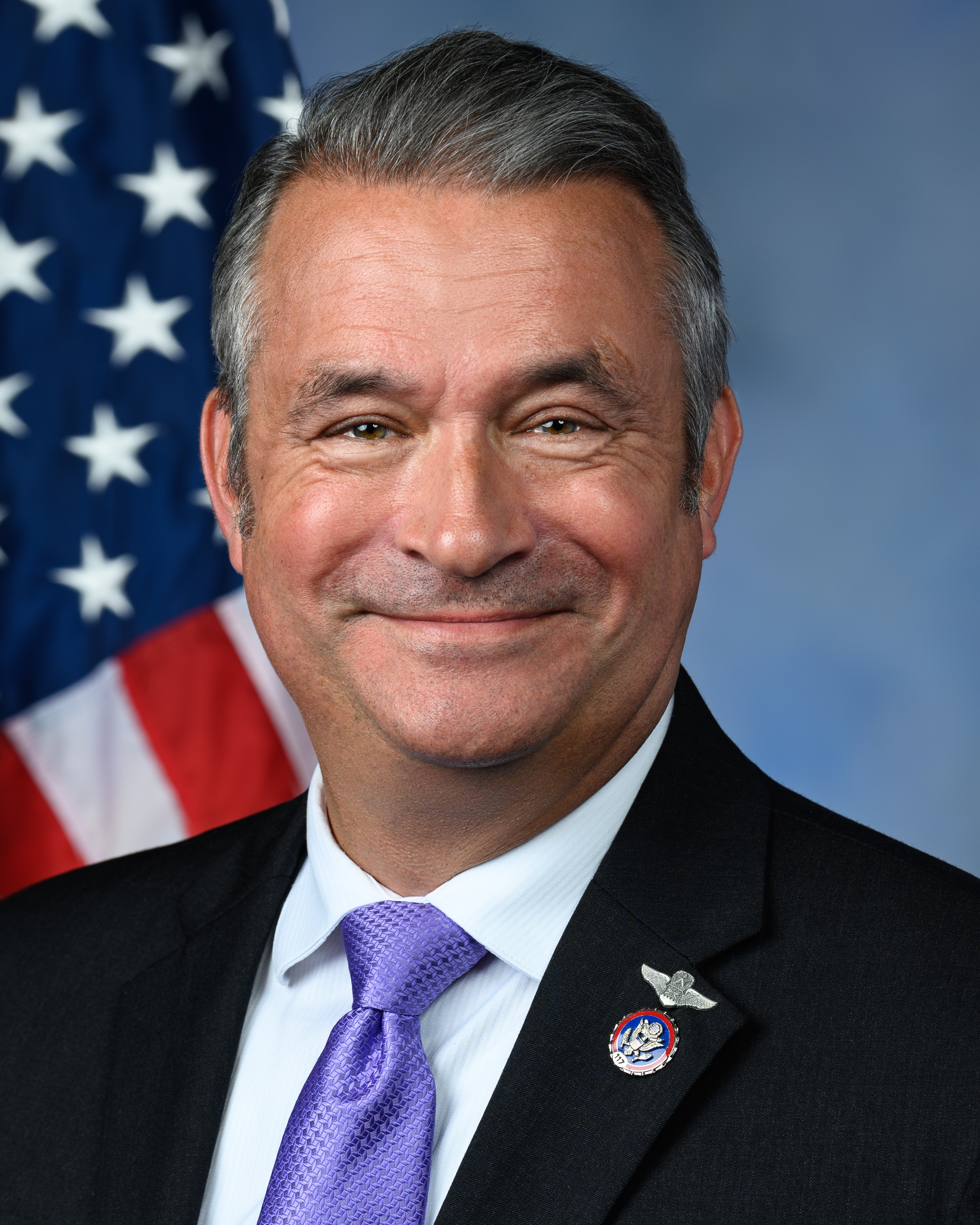

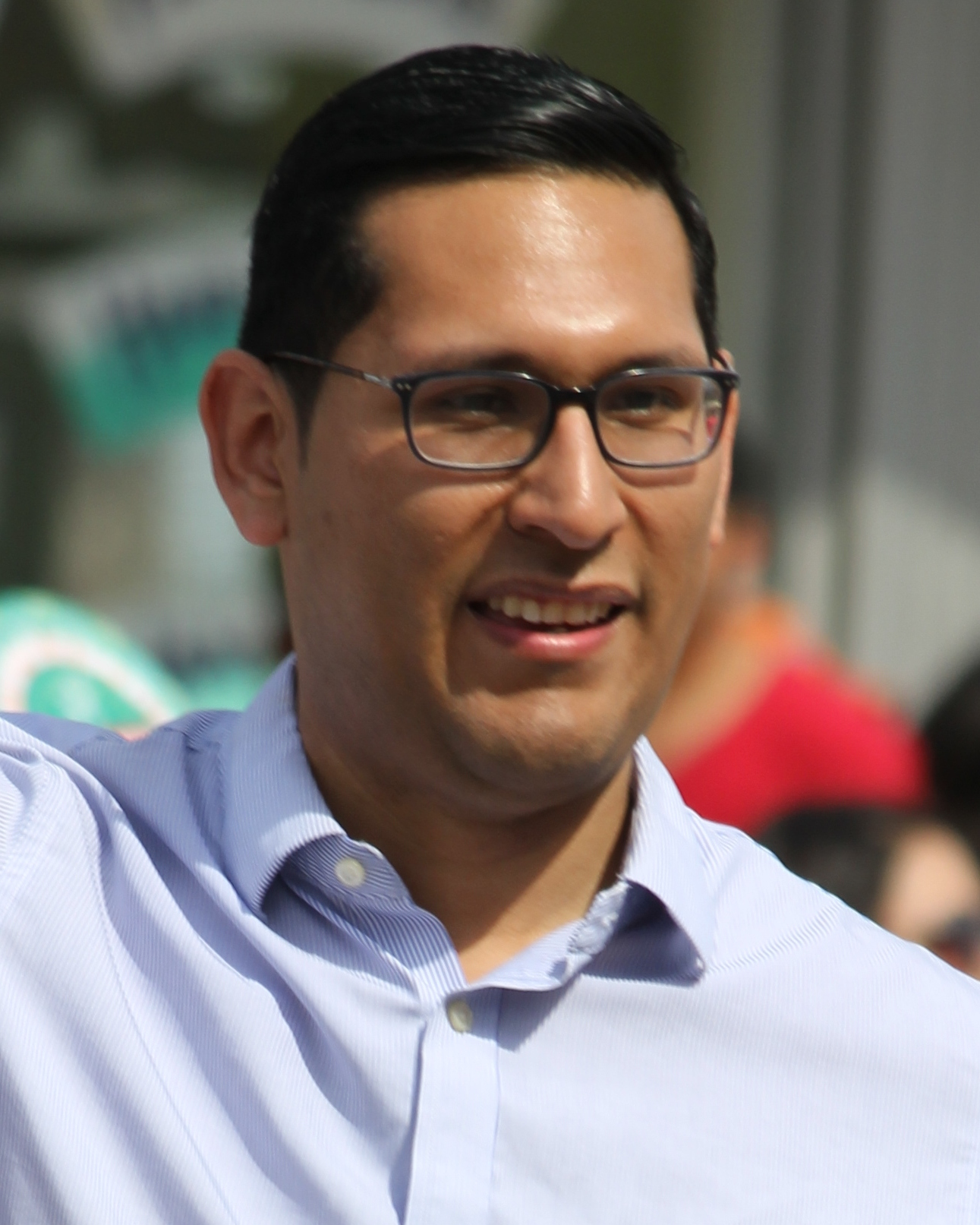
| Nominee | Don Bacon | Tony Vargas |
| Party | Republican | Democratic |
| Popular vote | 112,663 | 106,807 |
| Percentage | 51.3% | 48.7% |
- County results Bacon: 60–70% 70–80% Vargas: 50–60%
U.S. Representative before election
Don Bacon
Republican
Elected U.S. Representative
Don Bacon
Republican

The 2nd district covers the Omaha metropolitan area, including all of Douglas County, home to the city of Omaha, parts of Saunders County, and suburban parts of northern Sarpy County, including La Vista and Papillon. The incumbent was Republican Don Bacon, who was re-elected with 50.8% of the vote in 2020 on the same ballot with which Democratic presidential nominee Joe Biden won the district with 52.2%.

During the campaign, a research firm contracted by the Democratic Congressional Campaign Committee inappropriately obtained the military records of Don Bacon.

=== Republican primary ===
==== Candidates ====
===== Nominee =====
- Don Bacon, incumbent U.S. representative

===== Eliminated in primary =====
- Steve Kuehl

===== Withdrawn =====
- Jim Schultze, IT professional

==== Endorsements ====
Don Bacon

Organizations

- Citizens for Responsible Energy Solutions
- National Rifle Association-Political Victory Fund
- Nebraska Right to Life PAC
- Pro-Israel America
- Republican Jewish Coalition PAC
- Tea Party Express

==== Results ====
Republican primary results
| Party | Candidate | Votes | % |
|---|---|---|---|
| Republican | Don Bacon (incumbent) | 53,824 | 77.2 |
| Republican | Steve Kuehl | 15,945 | 22.8 |
| Total votes | | 69,769 | 100.0 |

=== Democratic primary ===
==== Candidates ====
===== Nominee =====
- Tony Vargas, state senator

===== Eliminated in primary =====
- Alisha Shelton, mental health counselor and candidate for U.S. Senate in 2020

===== Declined =====
- Kara Eastman, nonprofit executive and nominee for this district in 2018 and 2020 (endorsed Shelton)
- John Ewing, Douglas County treasurer and nominee for this district in 2012
- Megan Hunt, state senator (running for re-election)
- Precious McKesson, political activist and Nebraska director for the Joe Biden 2020 presidential campaign
- Crystal Rhoades, member of the Nebraska Public Service Commission
- Sage Rosenfels, former professional football player

===== Endorsements =====
Alisha Shelton

Organizations

- The Collective PAC
- Congressional Black Caucus
- EMILY's List
Tony Vargas

U.S. senators

- Bob Kerrey, former U.S. senator from Nebraska (1989–2001), former governor of Nebraska (1983–1987), and candidate for President of the United States in 1992

Labor unions

- Nebraska AFL-CIO
- Communication Workers of America (CWA)
- IBEW Local 22
- Nebraska State Education Association
- United Auto Workers

Organizations

- 314 Action Fund
- BOLD PAC
- Congressional Hispanic Caucus
- Jewish Democratic Council of America
- Latino Victory Fund
- League of Conservation Voters Action Fund
- Moms Demand Action
- NARAL Pro-Choice America (post-primary)
- National Committee to Preserve Social Security and Medicare
- New Democrat Coalition
- Planned Parenthood Action Fund
- Sierra Club Nebraska chapter

==== Results ====
Democratic primary results
| Party | Candidate | Votes | % |
|---|---|---|---|
| Democratic | Tony Vargas | 31,930 | 68.6 |
| Democratic | Alisha Shelton | 14,585 | 31.4 |
| Total votes | | 46,515 | 100.0 |

=== General election ===
==== Debates and forums ====
2022 Nebraska 2nd congressional district debates and forums
| No. | Date | Host | Moderator | Link | Participants | |
| P Participant A Absent N Non-invitee I Invitee W Withdrawn | | | | | | |
| P Participant A Absent N Non-invitee I Invitee W Withdrawn | | | | | Bacon | Vargas |
|---|---|---|---|---|---|---|
| 1 | October 13, 2022 | League of Women Voters and Omaha Press Club | N/A | N/A | P | P |
| 2 | October 16, 2022 | KETV | N/A | | P | P |

==== Predictions ====
| Source | Ranking | As of |
|---|---|---|
| The Cook Political Report | Tossup | November 1, 2022 |
| Inside Elections | Tossup | September 1, 2022 |
| Roll Call | Tossup | August 26, 2022 |
| Sabato's Crystal Ball | Lean R | November 2, 2022 |
| Politico | Tossup | October 4, 2022 |
| RCP | Lean R | September 1, 2022 |
| Fox News | Lean R | November 1, 2022 |
| DDHQ | Likely R | September 5, 2022 |
| FiveThirtyEight | Likely R | September 6, 2022 |
| The Economist | Tossup | November 5, 2022 |

==== Polling ====
Aggregate polls

| Source of poll aggregation | Dates administered | Dates updated | Don Bacon (R) | Tony Vargas (D) | Undecided (Note: Calculated by taking the difference of 100% and all other candidates combined.) | Margin |
|---|---|---|---|---|---|---|
| FiveThirtyEight | May 10 – August 7, 2022 | August 11, 2022 | 48.3% | 41.9% | 9.8% | Bacon +6.4% |

| Poll source | Date(s) administered | Sample size | Margin of error | Don Bacon (R) | Tony Vargas (D) | Undecided |
|---|---|---|---|---|---|---|
| Impact Research (D) (Note: This poll was sponsored by 314 Action, which supports Vargas) | August 3–7, 2022 | 501 (LV) | ± 4.5% | 47% | 46% | 7% |
| GBAO (D) (Note: This poll was sponsored by Vargas's campaign) | June 27–30, 2022 | 500 (LV) | ± 4.4% | 47% | 48% | 5% |
| RMG Research | May 19–20, 2022 | 500 (LV) (Note: Poll uses likely voters who voted in the primaries) | ± 4.5% | 52% | 37% | 9% |
| Change Research (D) | May 6–10, 2022 | 564 (LV) | ± 4.6% | 39% | 42% | 16% |
| Change Research (D) | March 26–29, 2022 | 550 (LV) | ± 4.5% | 39% | 40% | 16% |

Hypothetical polling

Generic Republican vs. generic Democrat

| Poll source | Date(s) administered | Sample size | Margin of error | Generic Republican | Generic Democrat | Undecided |
|---|---|---|---|---|---|---|
| Public Policy Polling (D) (Note: This poll was sponsored by the House Majority PAC) | October 18, 2022 | – | – | 44% | 47% | 9% |
| Impact Research (D) | August 3–7, 2022 | 501 (LV) | ± 4.5% | 44% | 40% | 16% |
| Change Research (D) | March 26–29, 2022 | 550 (LV) | ± 4.5% | 40% | 39% | 21% |

==== Results ====
2022 Nebraska's 2nd congressional district election
| Party | Candidate | Votes | % |
|---|---|---|---|
| Republican | Don Bacon (incumbent) | 112,663 | 51.3 |
| Democratic | Tony Vargas | 106,807 | 48.7 |
| Total votes | | 219,470 | 100.0 |
| Republican hold | | | |

==== By county ====
| County | Don Bacon Republican | | Tony Vargas Democratic | | Total votes |
| County | % | # | % | # | Total votes |
|---|---|---|---|---|---|
| Douglas | 48.77% | 93,363 | 51.23% | 98,055 | 191,418 |
| Sarpy | 65.37% | 12,189 | 34.63% | 6,457 | 18,646 |
| Saunders | 75.60% | 7,111 | 24.40% | 2,295 | 9,406 |

== District 3 ==
2022 Nebraska's 3rd congressional district election
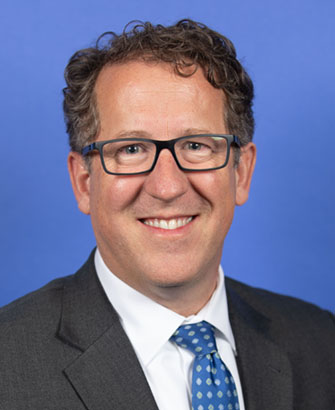

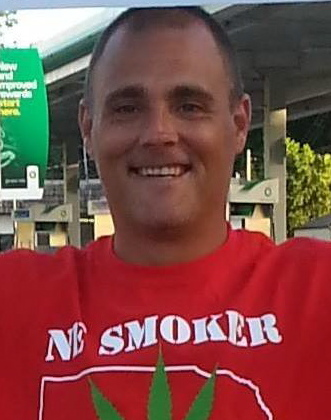
| Nominee | Adrian Smith | David Else | Mark Elworth Jr. |
| Party | Republican | Democratic | Legal Marijuana NOW |
| Popular vote | 172,700 | 34,836 | 13,016 |
| Percentage | 78.3% | 15.8% | 5.9% |
- County results Smith: 60–70% 70–80% 80–90% >90%
U.S. Representative before election
Adrian Smith
Republican
Elected U.S. Representative
Adrian Smith
Republican

The 3rd district covers most of the rural central and western part of the state, and includes Grand Island, Kearney, Hastings, North Platte, Alliance, and Scottsbluff. The incumbent was Republican Adrian Smith, who was re-elected with 78.5% of the vote in 2020.

=== Republican primary ===
==== Candidates ====
===== Nominee =====
- Adrian Smith, incumbent U.S. representative

===== Eliminated in primary =====
- Mike Calhoun

==== Endorsements ====
Adrian Smith

Federal officials

- Donald Trump, 45th president of the United States (2017–2021)

Organizations

- National Rifle Association-Political Victory Fund
- Nebraska Right to Life PAC

==== Results ====
Republican primary results
| Party | Candidate | Votes | % |
|---|---|---|---|
| Republican | Adrian Smith (incumbent) | 89,453 | 76.0 |
| Republican | Mike Calhoun | 28,243 | 24.0 |
| Total votes | | 117,696 | 100.0 |

=== Democratic primary ===
==== Candidates ====
===== Nominee =====
- David Else

===== Eliminated in primary =====
- Daniel Wik, doctor

==== Results ====
Primary results by county: Else: 50–60%; 60–70%; 70–80%; 80–90%; Wik: 50–60%; 60–70%; 70–80%; Tie: 50–60%

Democratic primary results
| Party | Candidate | Votes | % |
|---|---|---|---|
| Democratic | David Else | 8,701 | 52.2 |
| Democratic | Daniel Wik | 7,968 | 47.8 |
| Total votes | | 16,669 | 100.0 |

=== Legal Marijuana Now primary ===
==== Results ====
Legal Marijuana Now primary results
| Party | Candidate | Votes | % |
|---|---|---|---|
| Legal Marijuana Now | Mark Elworth Jr. | 89 | 100.0 |
| Total votes | | 89 | 100.0 |

=== General election ===
==== Predictions ====
| Source | Ranking | As of |
|---|---|---|
| The Cook Political Report | Solid R | September 1, 2022 |
| Inside Elections | Solid R | September 1, 2022 |
| Sabato's Crystal Ball | Safe R | August 24, 2022 |
| Politico | Solid R | August 23, 2022 |
| RCP | Safe R | September 1, 2022 |
| Fox News | Solid R | August 22, 2022 |
| DDHQ | Solid R | September 5, 2022 |
| FiveThirtyEight | Solid R | September 6, 2022 |
| The Economist | Safe R | September 28, 2022 |

==== Results ====
2022 Nebraska's 3rd congressional district election
| Party | Candidate | Votes | % |
|---|---|---|---|
| Republican | Adrian Smith (incumbent) | 172,700 | 78.3 |
| Democratic | David Else | 34,836 | 15.8 |
| Legal Marijuana Now | Mark Elworth Jr. | 13,016 | 5.9 |
| Total votes | | 220,552 | 100.0 |
| Republican hold | | | |

== See also ==
- 2022 Nebraska elections

== Notes ==
Partisan clients
