= 2022 Nebraska gubernatorial election =

- November 8, 2022
- Turnout: 54.93% ▼3.02 pp
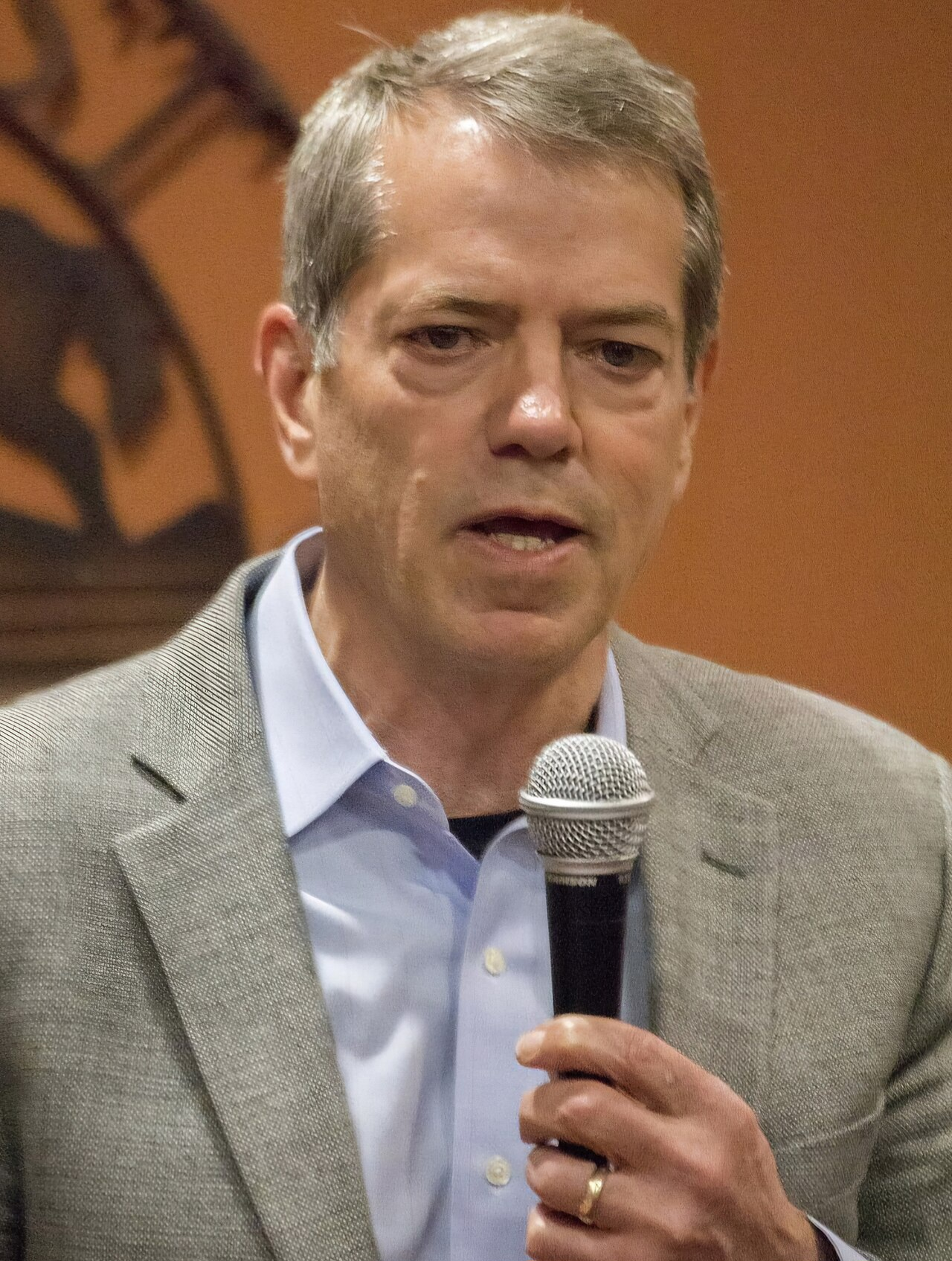

Nominee	Jim Pillen	Carol Blood
Party	Republican	Democratic
Running mate	Joe Kelly	Al Davis
Popular vote	398,334	242,006
Percentage	59.22%	35.98%
- Pillen: 40–50% 50–60% 60–70% 70–80% 80–90% Blood: 40–50% 50–60%
Governor before election
Pete Ricketts
Republican
Elected Governor
Jim Pillen
Republican

The 2022 Nebraska gubernatorial election took place on November 8, 2022, to elect the next governor of the U.S. state of Nebraska. Incumbent Republican governor Pete Ricketts was term-limited and unable to seek a third term. In the general election, Republican Jim Pillen won the gubernatorial election by a 23-point margin.

Nebraska's primary elections were held on May 10. Pillen, the former University of Nebraska Board of Regents chair, won the Republican nomination, while state senator Carol Blood won the Democratic nomination.

The race took on increased importance in October 2022, when U.S. senator Ben Sasse announced he would resign and Ricketts said he would allow the winner of the gubernatorial election to appoint Sasse's replacement. In the end, Pillen appointed Ricketts to Sasse's seat.

== Republican primary ==
=== Candidates ===
==== Nominated ====
- Jim Pillen, member and former chair of the University of Nebraska Board of Regents
  - Running mate: Joe Kelly, former U.S. Attorney for the District of Nebraska

==== Eliminated in primary ====
- Donna Carpenter, contractor
- Michael Connely, educational advisor, quality assurance director, small-scale agribusiness, USMC veteran
- Charles Herbster, agribusiness executive and candidate for governor in 2014
- Brett Lindstrom, financial advisor, state senator and candidate for Nebraska's 2nd congressional district in 2012
  - Running mate: Dave Rippe, real estate broker and former director of the Nebraska Department of Economic Development
- Lela McNinch
- Breland Ridenour, information technology manager
- Theresa Thibodeau, former state senator and former chair of the Douglas County Republican Party
  - Running mate: Trent Loos, agriculture advocate and podcast host

==== Declined ====
- Don Bacon, U.S. representative for Nebraska's 2nd congressional district (successfully ran for re-election)
- Deb Fischer, U.S. senator
- Mike Flood, state senator, former Speaker of the Nebraska Legislature, and candidate for governor in 2014
- Mike Foley, Lieutenant Governor of Nebraska, former Nebraska State Auditor, and candidate for governor in 2014 (successfully ran for State Auditor; endorsed Herbster)
- Jeff Fortenberry, former U.S. representative for Nebraska's 1st congressional district
- Dave Heineman, former governor
- Mike Hilgers, Speaker of the Nebraska Legislature (successfully ran for Attorney General)
- Greg Ibach, former U.S. Under Secretary of Agriculture for Marketing and Regulatory Programs and former Nebraska Director of Agriculture
- Dave Nabity, financial adviser, talk show host, and candidate for governor in 2006
- Bryan Slone, president of the Nebraska Chamber of Commerce and candidate for governor in 2014
- Adrian Smith, U.S. representative for Nebraska's 3rd congressional district (successfully ran for re-election)
- John Stinner, state senator
- Jean Stothert, Mayor of Omaha (endorsed Lindstrom)

=== Endorsements ===
Charles W. Herbster

U.S. Executive Branch officials

- Hal Daub, former chair of the Social Security Advisory Board (2002–2006), former mayor of Omaha (1995–2001), and former U.S. representative for Nebraska's 2nd congressional district (1981–1989)
- Donald Trump, 45th president of the United States (2017–2021)

Statewide officials

- Mike Foley, Lieutenant Governor of Nebraska (2015–present), former Nebraska State Auditor (2007–2015), and candidate for governor in 2014
- Kristi Noem, Governor of South Dakota (2019–present) and former U.S. representative for South Dakota's at-large congressional district (2011–2019)

State legislators

- Tom Brewer, state senator from the 43rd district (2017–present)
- Tom Briese, state senator from the 41st district (2017–2023)
- Steve Halloran, state senator from the 33rd district (2017–present)

Organizations

- American Conservative Union
Brett Lindstrom

U.S. representatives

- Brad Ashford, former U.S. representative for Nebraska's 2nd congressional district (2015–2017) (Democratic; Deceased; Republican primary only; co-endorsed with Blood)

State legislators

- Bob Krist, former state senator from the 10th district (2009–2019) and Democratic nominee for governor in 2018

Local officials

- Jean Stothert, Mayor of Omaha (2013–present)

Organizations

- Nebraska AFL–CIO (Republican primary only; co-endorsed with Blood)
Jim Pillen

U.S. representatives

- Tom Osborne, former U.S. representative for Nebraska's 3rd congressional district (2001–2007)

Statewide officials

- Jon Bruning, former Nebraska Attorney General (2003–2015)
- Kay A. Orr, former governor of Nebraska (1987–1991)
- Doug Peterson, Nebraska Attorney General (2015–2023)
- Pete Ricketts, Governor of Nebraska (2015–2023)

State legislators

- Dan Hughes, state senator from the 44th district (2015–2023)
- Lou Ann Linehan, state senator from the 39th district (2017–present)

Local officials

- Don Kleine, Douglas County District Attorney (2007–present)
- Terry Wagner, Lancaster County Sheriff

Organizations

- Americans for Prosperity
- Nebraska Farm Bureau

=== Polling ===
Graphical summary

View source data.

Poll source	Date(s) administered	Sample size (Note: Key: A – all adults RV – registered voters LV – likely voters V – unclear)	Margin of error	Charles Herbster	Brett Lindstrom	Jim Pillen	Theresa Thibodeau	Other	Undecided
WPA Intelligence (R) (Note: Poll conducted for Pillen's campaign)	April 30 – May 2, 2022	500 (LV)	± 4.4%	26%	16%	31%	–	8%	19%
WPA Intelligence (R)	April 26–28, 2022	505 (LV)	± 4.4%	23%	20%	24%	7%	2%	24%
Data Targeting (R) (Note: Poll conducted for Neilan Strategy Group)	April 19–20, 2022	858 (LV)	± 4.9%	26%	28%	24%	6%	–	16%
3D Strategic Research (R) (Note: Poll conducted for Lindstrom's campaign)	April 10–12, 2022	500 (LV)	± 4.4%	23%	27%	27%	6%	5%	12%
Moore Information Group (R)	March 26–29, 2022	206 (LV)	± 7.0%	23%	19%	10%	5%	9% (Note: "None" with 5%; Connely with 3%; Wentz with 1%; Carpenter and Ridenour with <1%; McNinch with 0%)	34%
KAConsulting LLC (R) (Note: Poll conducted for Herbster's campaign)	March 8–10, 2022	600 (LV)	± 4.0%	27%	17%	18%	3%	–	35%
3D Strategic Research (R)	March 7–9, 2022	500 (LV)	± 4.4%	30%	20%	23%	3%	6%	18%
Data Targeting (R)	February 8–11, 2022	1,168 (LV)	± 2.9%	27%	21%	26%	–	–	–
3D Strategic Research (R)	September 2021	– (LV)	–	32%	10%	19%	–	9%	30%

=== Results ===
Results by county Pillen: 30–40%; 40–50%; 50–60%; 60–70%; Herbster: 30–40%; 40–50%; 50–60%; Lindstrom: 30–40%; 40–50%

Pillen, Herbster, and Lindstrom all won their respective home counties – Pillen won Platte County with 66.3% of the vote, Herbster won Richardson County with 55.7% of the vote, and Lindstrom won Douglas County with 39.5% of the vote. Lindstrom won the Omaha metropolitan area and came close to winning Lancaster County, home to state capital Lincoln, losing to Pillen by about 2.1%. Pillen and Herbster won parts of more rural Nebraska.

While Herbster won most of the Sandhills region, Pillen won most of northeastern Nebraska and counties along the I-80 corridor.

Republican primary results
Party	Candidate	Votes	%
Republican	Jim Pillen	91,555	33.88%
Republican	Charles Herbster	80,771	29.91%
Republican	Brett Lindstrom	70,554	26.14%
Republican	Theresa Thibodeau	16,432	6.07%
Republican	Breland Ridenour	4,685	1.73%
Republican	Michael Connely	2,838	1.05%
Republican	Donna Nicole Carpenter	1,536	0.57%
Republican	Lela McNinch	1,192	0.44%
Republican	Troy Wentz	708	0.26%
Total votes		270,271	100.00%

== Democratic primary ==
=== Candidates ===
==== Nominated ====
- Carol Blood, state senator
  - Running mate: Al Davis, former state senator

==== Eliminated in primary ====
- Roy A. Harris

==== Withdrew ====
- Bob Krist, former state senator and nominee for governor in 2018 (endorsed Lindstrom)

==== Declined ====
- Sara Howard, member of the Omaha Public Power District board and former state senator
- Steve Lathrop, state senator
- Alisha Shelton, behavioral health clinical supervisor and candidate for U.S. Senate in 2020 (unsuccessfully ran for U.S. House)
- Tony Vargas, state senator (unsuccessfully ran for U.S. House)

=== Endorsements ===
Carol Blood

U.S. representatives

- Brad Ashford, former U.S. representative for Nebraska's 2nd congressional district (2015–2017) (Democratic primary only; deceased; co-endorsed with Lindstrom)

Organizations

- Nebraska AFL–CIO (Democratic primary only; co-endorsed with Lindstrom)
- Nebraska Democratic Party
- Nebraska Sierra Club

=== Results ===
Results by county: Blood: 50–60%; 60–70%; 70–80%; 80–90%; 90–100%; Harris: 80–90%

Democratic primary results
Party	Candidate	Votes	%
Democratic	Carol Blood	88,859	88.75%
Democratic	Roy A. Harris	11,267	11.25%
Total votes		100,126	100.00%

== Libertarian primary ==
=== Candidates ===
==== Declared ====
- Scott Zimmerman, businessman, comedian, founder of Z-Trak Productions and nominee for lieutenant governor in 2014
  - Running mate: Jason Blumenthal

=== Results ===
Libertarian primary results
Party	Candidate	Votes	%
Libertarian	Scott Zimmerman	1,595	100.00%
Total votes		1,595	100.00%

== General election ==
=== Predictions ===
Source	Ranking	As of
The Cook Political Report	Solid R	March 4, 2022
Inside Elections	Solid R	March 4, 2022
Sabato's Crystal Ball	Safe R	January 26, 2022
Politico	Solid R	April 1, 2022
RCP	Safe R	January 10, 2022
Fox News	Solid R	May 12, 2022
538	Solid R	June 30, 2022
Elections Daily	Safe R	November 7, 2022

=== Post-primary endorsements ===
Jim Pillen (R)

Statewide officials

- Glenn Youngkin, Governor of Virginia (2022–present)

State legislators

- Brett Lindstrom, state senator from the 18th district (2015–2023), candidate for Nebraska's 2nd congressional district in 2012 and candidate for governor in 2022

Organizations

- Americans for Prosperity
- Nebraska Farm Bureau
Carol Blood (D)

Organizations

- National Education Association
- National Women's Political Caucus

Newspapers

- Lincoln Journal Star
- Omaha World-Herald

=== Polling ===
Poll source	Date(s) administered	Sample size	Margin of error	Jim Pillen (R)	Carol Blood (D)	Other	Undecided
Data Targeting (R)	September 26–28, 2022	1,340 (LV)	± 2.7%	48%	41%	–	11%

=== Results ===
2022 Nebraska gubernatorial election
Party	Candidate	Votes	%	±%
Republican	Jim Pillen; Joe Kelly	398,334	59.22%	+0.22%
Democratic	Carol Blood; Al Davis	242,006	35.98%	−5.02%
Libertarian	Scott Zimmerman; Jason Blumenthal	26,455	3.93%	—
Write-in		5,798	0.86%	—
Total votes		672,593	100.00%	
Turnout		682,716	54.93%	
Registered electors		1,242,930		
Republican hold				

==== By county ====
By county

County	Pillen /Kelly Republican		Blood / Davis Democratic		Zimmerman / Blumenthal Libertarian		Write-ins		Margin		Total
County	#	%	#	%	#	%	#	%	#	%	Total
Adams	6,973	67.03%	2,821	27.12%	460	4.42%	149	1.43%	4,152	39.91%	10,403
Antelope	2,026	81.63%	241	9.71%	80	3.22%	135	5.44%	1,785	71.92%	2,482
Arthur	220	88.00%	13	5.20%	11	4.40%	6	2.40%	207	82.80%	250
Banner	316	85.64%	29	7.86%	20	5.42%	4	1.08%	287	77.78%	369
Blaine	169	82.04%	23	11.17%	12	5.83%	2	0.97%	146	70.87%	206
Boone	2,026	77.95%	393	15.12%	157	6.04%	23	0.88%	1,633	62.83%	2,599
Box Butte	2,462	73.08%	761	22.59%	122	3.62%	24	0.71%	1,701	50.49%	3,369
Boyd	739	81.75%	99	10.95%	40	4.42%	26	2.88%	640	70.80%	904
Brown	938	77.14%	159	13.08%	57	4.69%	62	5.10%	779	64.06%	1,216
Buffalo	11,233	69.99%	3,946	24.59%	718	4.47%	152	0.95%	7,287	45.40%	16,049
Burt	2,030	72.32%	638	22.73%	122	4.35%	17	0.61%	1,392	49.59%	2,807
Butler	2,773	78.49%	585	16.56%	134	3.79%	41	1.16%	2,188	61.93%	3,533
Cass	7,462	65.43%	3,317	29.08%	557	4.88%	69	0.60%	4,145	36.34%	11,405
Cedar	3,107	80.49%	466	12.07%	165	4.27%	122	3.16%	2,641	68.42%	3,860
Chase	1,296	84.65%	176	11.50%	53	3.46%	6	0.39%	1,120	73.15%	1,531
Cherry	1,984	77.74%	240	9.40%	145	5.68%	183	7.17%	1,744	68.34%	2,552
Cheyenne	2,688	80.38%	456	13.64%	169	5.05%	31	0.93%	2,232	66.75%	3,344
Clay	2,175	78.75%	405	14.66%	134	4.85%	48	1.74%	1,770	64.08%	2,762
Colfax	1,892	77.86%	445	18.31%	76	3.13%	17	0.70%	1,447	59.55%	2,430
Cuming	2,589	80.65%	509	15.86%	96	2.99%	16	0.50%	2,080	64.80%	3,210
Custer	3,562	80.77%	561	12.72%	203	4.60%	84	1.90%	3,001	68.05%	4,410
Dakota	2,525	69.98%	931	25.80%	147	4.07%	5	0.14%	1,594	44.18%	3,608
Dawes	2,158	67.48%	821	25.67%	120	3.75%	99	3.10%	1,337	41.81%	3,198
Dawson	4,303	76.31%	1,035	18.35%	280	4.97%	21	0.37%	3,268	57.95%	5,639
Deuel	612	83.49%	76	10.37%	43	5.87%	2	0.27%	536	73.12%	733
Dixon	1,710	75.87%	406	18.01%	93	4.13%	45	2.00%	1,304	57.85%	2,254
Dodge	7,682	66.42%	3,302	28.55%	531	4.59%	51	0.44%	4,380	37.87%	11,566
Douglas	87,136	45.50%	96,628	50.46%	6,982	3.65%	746	0.39%	−9,492	−4.96%	191,492
Dundy	650	85.30%	75	9.84%	28	3.67%	9	1.18%	575	75.46%	762
Fillmore	1,859	76.50%	491	20.21%	78	3.21%	2	0.08%	1,368	56.30%	2,430
Franklin	976	81.81%	159	13.33%	51	4.27%	7	0.59%	817	68.48%	1,193
Frontier	895	82.64%	142	13.11%	40	3.69%	6	0.55%	753	69.53%	1,083
Furnas	1,524	81.15%	241	12.83%	94	5.01%	19	1.01%	1,283	68.32%	1,878
Gage	5,317	66.20%	2,357	29.35%	317	3.95%	41	0.51%	2,960	36.85%	8,032
Garden	736	82.33%	109	12.19%	36	4.03%	13	1.45%	627	70.13%	894
Garfield	628	81.24%	80	10.35%	18	2.33%	47	6.08%	548	70.89%	773
Gosper	676	80.29%	127	15.08%	31	3.68%	8	0.95%	549	65.20%	842
Grant	253	89.72%	18	6.38%	8	2.84%	3	1.06%	235	83.33%	282
Greeley	766	73.37%	194	18.58%	51	4.89%	33	3.16%	572	54.79%	1,044
Hall	10,223	66.83%	4,145	27.10%	799	5.22%	131	0.86%	6,078	39.73%	15,298
Hamilton	3,128	75.83%	757	18.35%	183	4.44%	57	1.38%	2,371	57.48%	4,125
Harlan	1,109	77.93%	234	16.44%	74	5.20%	6	0.42%	875	61.49%	1,423
Hayes	341	86.55%	23	5.84%	23	5.84%	7	1.78%	318	80.71%	394
Hitchcock	844	79.17%	120	11.26%	50	4.69%	52	4.88%	724	67.92%	1,066
Holt	3,125	78.48%	431	10.82%	194	4.87%	232	5.83%	2,694	67.65%	3,982
Hooker	300	80.00%	62	16.53%	11	2.93%	2	0.53%	238	63.47%	375
Howard	1,853	75.45%	442	18.00%	127	5.17%	34	1.38%	1,411	57.45%	2,456
Jefferson	1,916	71.25%	634	23.58%	115	4.28%	24	0.89%	1,282	47.68%	2,689
Johnson	1,061	65.05%	467	28.63%	87	5.33%	16	0.98%	594	36.42%	1,631
Kearney	1,981	77.02%	448	17.42%	107	4.16%	36	1.40%	1,533	59.60%	2,572
Keith	2,337	80.09%	456	15.63%	98	3.36%	27	0.93%	1,881	64.46%	2,918
Keya Paha	318	75.71%	37	8.81%	23	5.48%	42	10.00%	281	66.90%	420
Kimball	1,115	83.52%	158	11.84%	60	4.49%	2	0.15%	957	71.69%	1,335
Knox	2,922	78.53%	586	15.75%	140	3.76%	73	1.96%	2,336	62.78%	3,721
Lancaster	52,769	45.94%	57,424	49.996%	3,808	3.32%	857	0.75%	−4,655	−4.05%	114,858
Lincoln	9,029	74.31%	2,481	20.42%	542	4.46%	99	0.81%	6,548	53.89%	12,151
Logan	290	86.05%	22	6.53%	12	3.56%	13	3.86%	268	79.53%	337
Loup	255	75.22%	48	14.16%	21	6.19%	15	4.42%	207	61.06%	339
Madison	9,108	77.63%	2,035	17.34%	474	4.04%	116	0.99%	7,073	60.28%	11,733
McPherson	188	84.30%	24	10.76%	9	4.04%	2	0.90%	164	73.54%	223
Merrick	2,629	78.55%	516	15.42%	157	4.69%	45	1.34%	2,113	63.13%	3,347
Morrill	1,543	78.60%	255	12.99%	125	6.37%	40	2.04%	1,288	65.61%	1,963
Nance	923	72.05%	260	20.30%	68	5.31%	30	2.34%	663	51.76%	1,281
Nemaha	1,655	70.52%	571	24.33%	109	4.64%	12	0.51%	1,084	46.19%	2,347
Nuckolls	1,276	80.10%	234	14.69%	48	3.01%	35	2.20%	1,042	65.41%	1,593
Otoe	3,920	67.62%	1,593	27.48%	238	4.11%	46	0.79%	2,327	40.14%	5,797
Pawnee	817	75.44%	224	20.68%	40	3.69%	2	0.18%	593	54.76%	1,083
Perkins	918	82.48%	135	12.13%	45	4.04%	15	1.35%	783	70.35%	1,113
Phelps	3,012	81.54%	509	13.78%	154	4.17%	19	0.51%	2,503	67.76%	3,694
Pierce	2,463	85.17%	288	9.96%	100	3.46%	41	1.42%	2,175	75.21%	2,892
Platte	9,103	81.58%	1,695	15.19%	308	2.76%	53	0.47%	7,408	66.39%	11,159
Polk	1,658	80.33%	321	15.55%	73	3.54%	12	0.58%	1,337	64.78%	2,064
Red Willow	3,174	79.23%	608	15.18%	204	5.09%	20	0.50%	2,566	64.05%	4,006
Richardson	1,987	66.88%	766	25.78%	165	5.55%	53	1.78%	1,221	41.10%	2,971
Rock	504	83.44%	63	10.43%	18	2.98%	19	3.15%	441	73.01%	604
Saline	2,388	63.06%	1,188	31.37%	179	4.73%	32	0.84%	1,200	31.69%	3,787
Sarpy	35,821	55.28%	26,039	40.19%	2,576	3.98%	358	0.55%	9,782	15.10%	64,794
Saunders	6,842	70.84%	2,316	23.98%	448	4.64%	52	0.54%	4,526	46.86%	9,658
Scotts Bluff	7,125	72.07%	2,259	22.85%	432	4.37%	70	0.71%	4,866	49.22%	9,886
Seward	4,921	72.80%	1,556	23.02%	244	3.61%	39	0.58%	3,365	49.78%	6,760
Sheridan	1,349	71.87%	226	12.04%	103	5.49%	199	10.60%	1,123	59.83%	1,877
Sherman	896	71.68%	246	19.68%	78	6.24%	30	2.40%	650	52.00%	1,250
Sioux	427	79.96%	56	10.49%	18	3.37%	33	6.18%	371	69.48%	534
Stanton	1,967	79.73%	340	13.78%	134	5.43%	26	1.05%	1,627	65.95%	2,467
Thayer	1,707	77.87%	373	17.02%	80	3.65%	32	1.46%	1,334	60.86%	2,192
Thomas	265	83.33%	29	9.12%	12	3.77%	12	3.77%	236	74.21%	318
Thurston	824	63.68%	424	32.77%	42	3.25%	4	0.31%	400	30.91%	1,294
Valley	1,414	78.12%	278	15.36%	78	4.31%	40	2.21%	1,136	62.76%	1,810
Washington	6,244	70.53%	2,227	25.16%	332	3.75%	50	0.56%	4,017	45.37%	8,853
Wayne	2,215	72.55%	685	22.44%	123	4.03%	30	0.98%	1,530	50.11%	3,053
Webster	1,021	77.76%	207	15.77%	55	4.19%	30	2.28%	814	62.00%	1,313
Wheeler	227	64.31%	39	11.05%	14	3.97%	73	20.68%	188	53.26%	353
York	3,821	75.81%	971	19.27%	219	4.35%	29	0.58%	2,850	56.55%	5,040
TOTALS	398,334	59.22%	242,006	35.98%	26,455	3.93%	5,798	0.86%	156,328	23.24%	672,593

==== By congressional district ====
Pillen won all three congressional districts.

District	Pillen	Blood	Representative
1st	55.77%	40.57%	Mike Flood
2nd	48.21%	48.06%	Don Bacon
3rd	75.04%	20.45%	Adrian Smith

== See also ==
- 2022 Nebraska elections

== Notes ==
Partisan clients
