= RMSP =

RMSP can mean:

- Republican Main Street Partnership
- Royal Mail Steam Packet Company
- Rail Motor Stopping Place
- Região Metropolitana de São Paulo
