= Stuhr (surname) =

- Pronunciation: German pronunciation: [ˈʂtur]

Origin
- Language: German
- Meaning: Nickname for an inflexible, obstinate person
- Region of origin: Germany, Denmark, Austria

- Elaine Stuhr (born 1936), American politician from Nebraska

- Stuhr Museum of the Prairie Pioneer, a museum in Grand Island, Nebraska

- Jerzy Stuhr (born 1947), Polish actor
- Kevin Stuhr Ellegaard, née Stuhr Larsen (born 1983), Danish football player
- Maciej Stuhr (born 1975), Polish actor, comedian, impressionist, psychologist

== See also ==
- Stuhr, a municipality in the district of Diepholz, in Lower Saxony, Germany
