= Greg L. Adams =

American politician

Greg Adams

32nd Speaker of the Nebraska Legislature
- In office 2013–2015
- Preceded by: Mike Flood
- Succeeded by: Galen Hadley

Member of the Nebraska Legislature from the 24th district
- In office 2007–2015
- Preceded by: Elaine Stuhr
- Succeeded by: Mark Kolterman

Personal details
- Born: February 6, 1952 (age 74) Columbus, Nebraska, U.S.
- Party: Republican
- Education: Wayne State College (BA, MEd)

Greg L. Adams (born February 6, 1952) was the Speaker of the Nebraska Legislature from 2013 to 2015.

== Personal life ==
He was born in Columbus, Nebraska on February 6, 1952. He received a B.A. in Education from Wayne State College in 1974 and an M.Ed. from Wayne State in 1975. In 1976 he became a high school teacher in American government and economics in the York, Nebraska public schools.

== Political experience ==
He served on the York City Council from 1986 to 1996, and became Mayor of York in 1996.

He was elected to the Legislature in 2006 serving Nebraska's 24th legislative district. He served as chairman of the Education Committee and a member of the Revenue committee; Committee On Committees; Developmental Disabilities Special Investigative committee; Education Commission of the States committee; Legislature's Planning Committee; and the Midwestern Higher Education Compact Commission.

He became the Speaker of the Legislature in 2013 when Mike Flood retired due to term limits. As Speaker he did not serve on standing committees, but was a member of the Executive Board and several other boards within the Legislature.

Due to term limits, he did not seek re-election to the Legislature in 2014. He was succeeded as Speaker by Galen Hadley.
