= 2014 Nebraska gubernatorial election =

- November 4, 2014
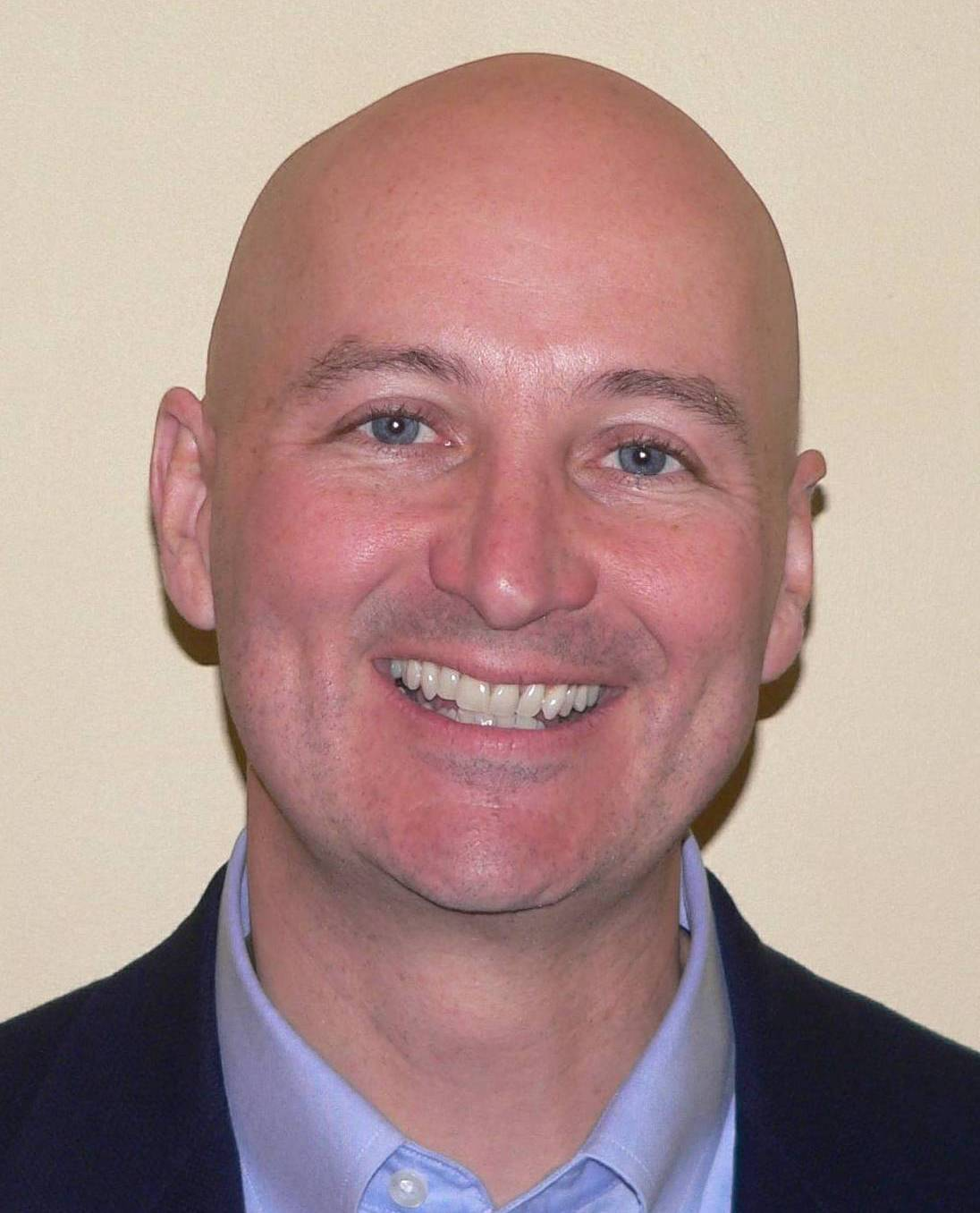

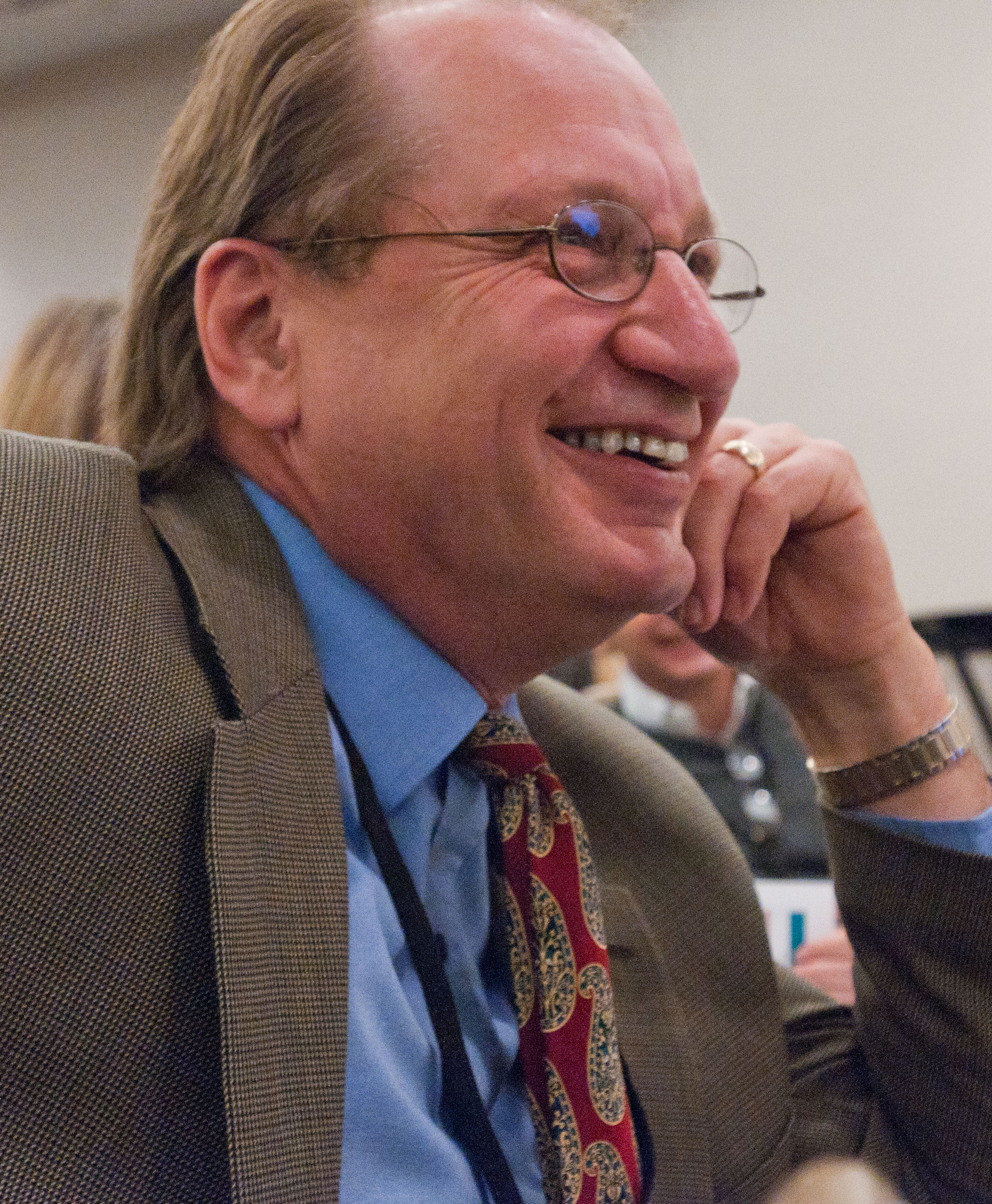
Nominee	Pete Ricketts	Chuck Hassebrook
Party	Republican	Democratic
Running mate	Mike Foley	Jane Raybould
Popular vote	308,751	211,905
Percentage	57.15%	39.23%
- Ricketts: 40–50% 50–60% 60–70% 70–80% 80–90% 90%+ Hassebrook: 40–50% 50–60% 60–70% 70–80% 80–90% 90%+ Tie: 40–50%
Governor before election
Dave Heineman
Republican
Elected Governor
Pete Ricketts
Republican

The 2014 Nebraska gubernatorial election took place on Tuesday, November 4, 2014, to elect the 40th Governor of Nebraska. Republican Candidate and former COO of TD Ameritrade Pete Ricketts defeated Democratic candidate and former Regent of the University of Nebraska Chuck Hassebrook, receiving 57.2% of the vote to Hassebrook's 39.2% This was the first open seat election, and the first time a Democrat won a county for governor since 1998.

== Republican primary ==
Lieutenant Governor Rick Sheehy first declared his intention to run for governor in July 2011. Considered to be the "hand-picked" successor to incumbent Governor Dave Heineman, he was endorsed by him. Sheehy was joined in the Republican primary by Speaker of the Nebraska Legislature Mike Flood in November 2012. Flood withdrew from the race less than a month later after his wife was diagnosed with breast cancer.

Sheehy resigned as Lieutenant Governor and withdrew from the race in February 2013 after the Omaha World-Herald discovered that he had made 2,300 phone calls on a state-issued phone, many of them long and at night, to four women, none of whom were his wife. At the end of the month, Flood was reported to be reconsidering his decision with his wife progressing well in her treatment. In July he announced that he would not re-enter the race.

Cattle rancher Charles W. Herbster, who had not formally entered the race but had been campaigning since July, became the third Republican to withdraw when he withdrew on August 23. He cited the health of his wife, who had recently undergone heart surgery.

In September 2013, Omaha businessman Pete Ricketts joined the race. Ricketts, a former chief operating officer of TD Ameritrade and the son of company founder Joe Ricketts, had run unsuccessfully in 2006 for the U.S. Senate seat held by Ben Nelson.

State Senator Charlie Janssen, who had lagged in endorsements and fundraising, withdrew from the race on February 3, 2014. He said: "The way the field was shaping up, I didn't see a clear path to victory." He later declared his candidacy for State Auditor.

In February 2014, state attorney general Jon Bruning announced that he was joining the race. His entry made him the perceived front-runner, supplanting Ricketts, who had been regarded as the leading contender up to that time.

In the May 13 Republican primary, Ricketts narrowly defeated Bruning, with 26.5% of the vote to Bruning's 25.5%. His 1-point margin of victory made this the closest Republican gubernatorial primary in 92 years, since the 1922 primary in which Charles Randall defeated Adam McMullen by 0.6 points.

=== Candidates ===
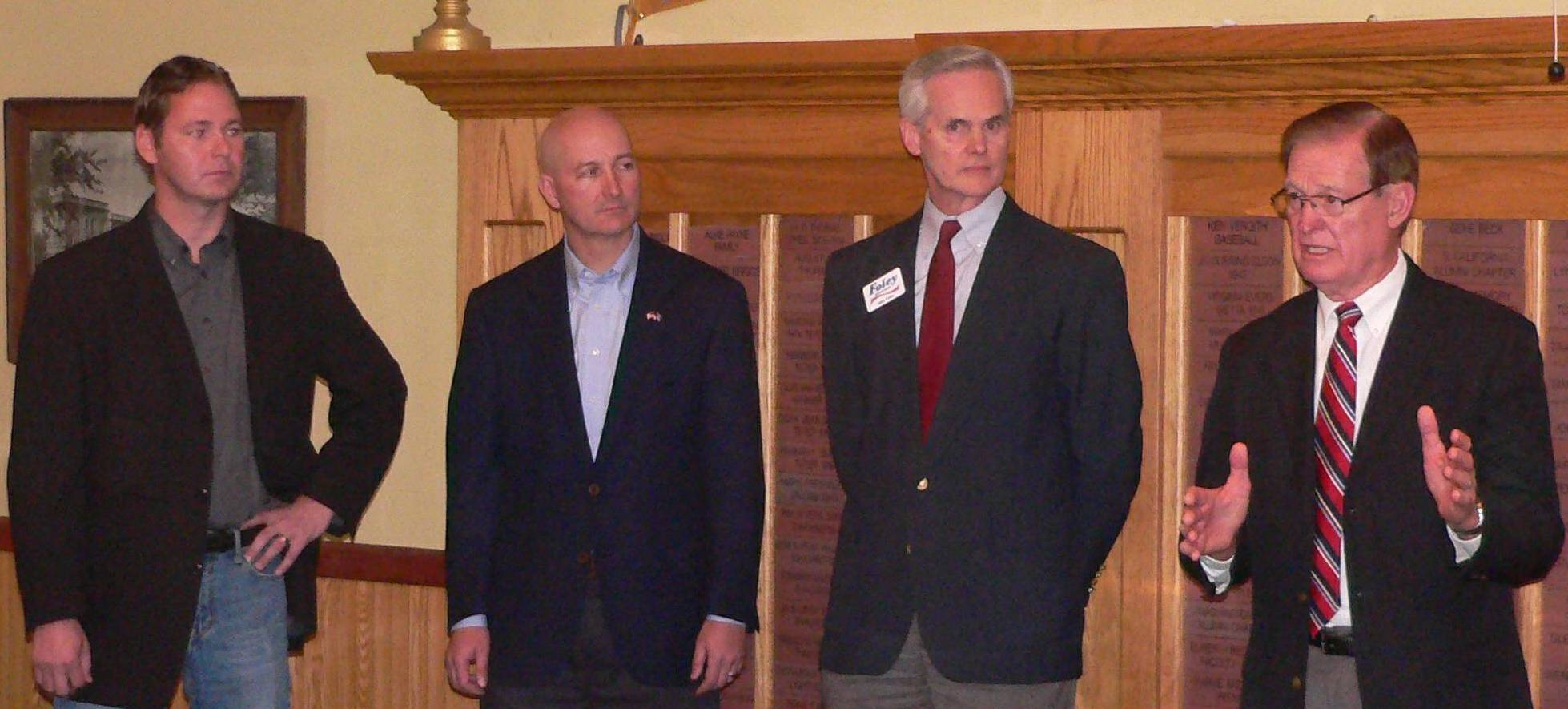
Buffalo County Republican Party candidate event in November 2013. From left to right: Charlie Janssen, Pete Ricketts, Mike Foley and Tom Carlson. Beau McCoy was not present at the event; Jon Bruning had not yet declared his candidacy.

- Jon Bruning, Nebraska Attorney General and candidate for the U.S. Senate in 2008 and 2012
- Tom Carlson, state senator
- Mike Foley, Nebraska Auditor of Public Accounts
- Beau McCoy, state senator
- Pete Ricketts, former COO of TD Ameritrade and nominee for the U.S. Senate in 2006
- Bryan Slone, tax attorney and Managing Partner of the Omaha office of Deloitte

==== Withdrew ====
- Mike Flood, former Speaker of the Nebraska Legislature
- Charles Herbster, businessman
- Charlie Janssen, state senator (running for State Auditor)
- Rick Sheehy, former Lieutenant Governor

==== Declined ====
- Tim Clare, Regent of the University of Nebraska
- Rex Fischer, HDR executive
- Jeff Fortenberry, U.S. Representative
- Lavon Heidemann, Lieutenant Governor
- David Kramer, Republican National Committee member and attorney
- Bob Krist, state senator
- Ben Sasse, President of Midland University (running for the U.S. Senate)
- Don Stenberg, Treasurer of Nebraska, candidate for the U.S. Senate in 1996, 2006 and 2012 and nominee for the U.S. Senate in 2000 (running for re-election)

=== Endorsements ===
Jon Bruning
- Dave Heineman, incumbent Governor
- Jean Stothert, Mayor of Omaha
Tom Carlson

Individuals

- Carroll Burling, former state senator
- Jim Cudaback, former state senator
- Al Davis, state senator
- Tom Hansen, state senator
- John Harms, state senator
- Rick Jeffery, Mayor of Holdrege
- Jerry Johnson, state senator
- Vickie McDonald, former state senator
- John E. Nelson, state senator
- Dave Pankonin, former state senator
- Les Seiler, state senator
- John Wightman, state senator

Organizations

- National Association of Insurance and Financial Advisors
Mike Foley
- Jeff Fortenberry, U.S. Representative
Beau McCoy
- Charles Herbster, businessman
Pete Ricketts
- Bill Barrett, former U.S. Representative (R-NE)
- Dick Cheney, former U.S. Vice President
- Ted Cruz, U.S. Senator (R-TX)
- Kay Orr, former Governor
- Sarah Palin, former Governor of Alaska and former vice presidential nominee
- Paul Ryan, U.S. Representative (R-WI) and former vice presidential nominee
- Lee Terry, U.S. Representative (R-NE)
- Charles Thone, former Governor and former U.S. Representative
- Scott Walker, Governor of Wisconsin
Bryan Slone
- Hal Daub, Regent of the University of Nebraska, former U.S. Representative and former Mayor of Omaha
- David Karnes, former U.S. Senator

=== Polling ===
Poll source	Date(s) administered	Sample size	Margin of error	Jon Bruning	Tom Carlson	Mike Foley	Charlie Janssen	Beau McCoy	Pete Ricketts	Bryan Slone	Other	Undecided
Magellan Strategies	May 8, 2014	525	±4.28%	24%	5%	18%	—	16%	25%	5%	1%	6%
Harper Polling	February 3–4, 2014	565	±4%	34.7%	5.3%	14.2%	5.6%	4.7%	16.2%	0.9%	—	18.4%

=== Results ===
Results by county: Ricketts: Ricketts—<40%; Ricketts—40–50%; Bruning: Bruning—<40%; Bruning—40–50%; Bruning—50–60%; McCoy: McCoy—<40%; McCoy—40–50%; Foley: Foley—<40%; Foley—40–50%; Carlson: Carlson—<40%; Slone: Slone—<40%

Republican primary results
Party	Candidate	Votes	%
Republican	Pete Ricketts	58,671	26.91%
Republican	Jon Bruning	56,324	25.84%
Republican	Beau McCoy	46,196	21.19%
Republican	Mike Foley	42,394	19.44%
Republican	Tom Carlson	9,080	4.17%
Republican	Bryan Slone	8,265	3.79%
Total votes		221,930	100.00%

== Democratic primary ==
=== Candidates ===
- Chuck Hassebrook, executive director of the Center for Rural Affairs, former Regent of the University of Nebraska and candidate for the U.S. Senate in 2012

==== Withdrew ====
- Annette Dubas, state senator

==== Declined ====
- Chris Beutler, Mayor of Lincoln
- Steve Lathrop, state senator
- Mike Meister, attorney, nominee for Attorney General of Nebraska in 2002 and nominee for governor in 2010

=== Endorsements ===
Chuck Hassebrook

Individuals

- Brad Ashford, Nebraska State Senator, LD 20 and Democratic congressional candidate for Nebraska's 2nd congressional district
- Bill Avery, Nebraska State Senator, LD 28
- Chris Beutler, Mayor of Lincoln
- Mike Boyle, member of the Douglas County Board of Commissioners and former Mayor of Omaha
- Warren Buffett, business magnate, investor and philanthropist
- Danielle Conrad, Nebraska State Senator, LD 46
- Tanya Cook, Nebraska State Senator, LD 13
- Mike Fahey, former Mayor of Omaha
- Ken Haar, Nebraska State Senator, LD 21
- Burke Harr, Nebraska State Senator, LD 8
- Sara Howard, Nebraska State Senator, LD 9
- Russ Karpisek, Nebraska State Senator, LD 32
- Rick Kolowski, Nebraska State Senator, LD 31
- Amanda McGill, Nebraska State Senator, LD 26 and Democratic candidate for Nebraska State Auditor
- Heath Mello, Nebraska State Senator, LD 5
- Kate Sullivan, Nebraska State Senator, LD 41
- Jim Suttle, former Mayor of Omaha
- Norm Wallman, Nebraska State Senator, LD 30

Organizations

- Nebraska Farmers Union
- Nebraska Fraternal Order of Police
- Omaha Police Officers Association
- Omaha Professional Fire Fighters Association, IAFF L385
- Planned Parenthood Voters of Nebraska

=== Results ===
Democratic primary results
Party	Candidate	Votes	%
Democratic	Chuck Hassebrook	65,620	100.00%
Total votes		65,620	100.00%

== Libertarian primary ==
=== Candidates ===
- Mark Elworth, Jr.

=== Results ===
Libertarian primary results
Party	Candidate	Votes	%
Libertarian	Mark G. Elworth, Jr.	402	100.00%
Total votes		402	100.00%

== General election ==
=== Debates ===
==== September 1 debate ====
Chuck Hassebrook and Pete Ricketts sparred over education policy, economics and full-time residency in Lincoln at the Nebraska State Fair. Hassebrook opposed school vouchers for public school students, suggesting that tax dollars should be used to improve public schools. Ricketts countered that a gradual voucher policy would help students while keeping money in public schools. The duo showed stark differences in economic policy, with Hassebrook supporting a minimum wage increase and Ricketts opposing an increased wage. Moderator Mike'l Severe asked both candidates if they would reside in the governor's mansion full-time if elected. Ricketts, who has three children attending school in Omaha, said that he had not made a final decision on the question. Hassebrook stated that Nebraska needs a "full-time governor" and that he would live in Lincoln because "40 hours a week is a vacation."

==== October 2 debate ====
The two candidates traded barbs over past positions in a debate sponsored by Nebraska Educational Communications. Hassebrook accused Ricketts of supporting Gov. Dave Heineman's (R) tax proposal in 2013, which would have increased sales tax rates. The Platte Institute, a conservative think-tank created by Ricketts, supported the tax proposal, which ultimately failed to pass in the face of increasing public criticism. Hassebrook argued that Ricketts tried to hide his support for the measure when he decided to run for governor. Ricketts denied support for the bill, noting that he did not agree with every position taken by the institute.

Ricketts countered by bringing up a report co-authored by Hassebrook in 1990 that called for a ban on exports of genetically modified crops. The issue of biotechnology in farming has grown in prominence due to the importance of Nebraska's agricultural sector. Hassebrook responded that he provided little assistance to the authors of the report, and was wrongly credited as a co-author. He also noted that he supported biotechnology research since the early 1990s, when he served on the University of Nebraska Board of Regents.

Debate viewers also saw Hassebrook and Ricketts stake out distinct positions on immigration and the proposed Keystone XL pipeline that would run through Nebraska. Hassebrook advocated for allowing driving licenses for children brought to the country illegally, while Ricketts opposed issuing licenses as a matter of protecting existing laws. Ricketts suggested that the XL Pipeline would bring jobs to the state and securely transport oil across the country, citing problems with rail transportation of oil. Hassebrook opposed the pipeline because he suggested the project would contribute to climate change.

- Complete video of debate

=== Candidates ===
In Nebraska, gubernatorial nominees select their running mates after the primary elections.

- Pete Ricketts (Republican), former COO of TD Ameritrade and nominee for the U.S. Senate in 2006

- Running mate: Mike Foley, Nebraska Auditor of Public Accounts. Ricketts had initially selected incumbent Lieutenant Governor Lavon Heidemann as his running mate, but Heidemann resigned from office and withdrew from the election on September 9, 2014, after allegations of domestic abuse. Ricketts named Foley as his new running mate within hours and, after some initial confusion as to whether Heidemann's name would still appear on the ballot, Secretary of State John A. Gale confirmed that the switch had been made to ensure "the accurate reflection of candidates on the ballot."

- Chuck Hassebrook (Democratic), executive director of the Center for Rural Affairs, former Regent of the University of Nebraska and candidate for the U.S. Senate in 2012

- Running mate: Jane Raybould, businesswoman and Lancaster County Commissioner

- Mark Elworth, Jr. (Libertarian)

- Running mate: Scott Zimmerman

=== Predictions ===
Source	Ranking	As of
The Cook Political Report	Solid R	November 3, 2014
Sabato's Crystal Ball	Safe R	November 3, 2014
Rothenberg Political Report	Safe R	November 3, 2014
Real Clear Politics	Likely R	November 3, 2014

=== Polling ===
Poll source	Date(s) administered	Sample size	Margin of error	Pete Ricketts (R)	Chuck Hassebrook (D)	Other	Undecided
CBS News/NYT/YouGov	October 16–23, 2014	681	± 5%	55%	35%	0%	11%
CBS News/NYT/YouGov	September 20 – October 1, 2014	721	± 4%	55%	35%	1%	9%
CBS News/NYT/YouGov	August 18 – September 2, 2014	987	± 4%	54%	34%	1%	11%
CBS News/NYT/YouGov	July 5–24, 2014	855	± 4.4%	49%	41%	0%	9%
Public Policy Polling^{1}	June 11–12, 2014	902	± 3.3%	42%	38%	8%^{2}	13%
Rasmussen Reports	May 14–15, 2014	750	± 4%	47%	40%	5%	8%

1. Poll conducted on behalf of Chuck Hassebrook's campaign.
2. Mark Elworth (Libertarian)

=== Results ===
2014 Nebraska gubernatorial election
Party	Candidate	Votes	%	±%
Republican	Pete Ricketts	308,751	57.15%	−16.75%
Democratic	Chuck Hassebrook	211,905	39.23%	+13.13%
Libertarian	Mark Elworth	19,001	3.52%	—
Write-in		545	0.10%	—
Majority		96,846	17.92%	−29.89%
Total votes		540,202	100.0%	
Republican hold				

==== By County ====
By county

County	Person Democratic		Person Republican		Various candidates Other parties		Margin		Total votes
County	#	%	#	%	#	%	#	%	Total votes
Adams County									
Antelope County									
Arthur County									
Banner County									
Blaine County									
Boone County									
Box Butte County									
Boyd County									
Brown County									
Buffalo County									
Burt County									
Butler County									
Cass County									
Cedar County									
Chase County									
Cherry County									
Cheyenne County									
Clay County									
Colfax County									
Cuming County									
Custer County									
Dakota County									
Dawes County									
Dawson County									
Deuel County									
Dixon County									
Dodge County									
Douglas County									
Dundy County									
Fillmore County									
Franklin County									
Frontier County									
Furnas County									
Gage County									
Garden County									
Garfield County									
Gosper County									
Grant County									
Greeley County									
Hall County									
Hamilton County									
Hayes County									
Hitchcock County									
Holt County									
Hooker County									
Howard County									
Jefferson County									
Johnson County									
Kearney County									
Keith County									
Keya Paha County									
Kimball County									
Knox County									
Lancaster County									
Lincoln County									
Logan County									
Loup County									
Madison County									
McPherson County									
Merrick County									
Morrill County									
Nance County									
Nance County									
Nemaha County									
Nuckolls County									
Otoe County									
Pawnee County									
Perkins County									
Phelps County									
Pierce County									
Platte County									
Polk County									
Red Willow County									
Richardson County									
Rock County									
Saline County									
Sarpy County									
Saunders County									
Scotts Bluff County									
Seward County									
Sheridan County									
Sioux County									
Stanton County									
Thayer County									
Stanton County									
Thurston County									
Valley County									
Washington County									
Wayne County									
Webster County									
Wheeler County									
York County									
Totals									

==== Counties that flipped from Republican to Democratic ====
- Burt (largest village: Tekamah)
- Lancaster (largest city: Lincoln)
- Saline (largest city: Crete)
- Thurston (largest village: Pender)
