= Patty Pansing Brooks =

American attorney and politician

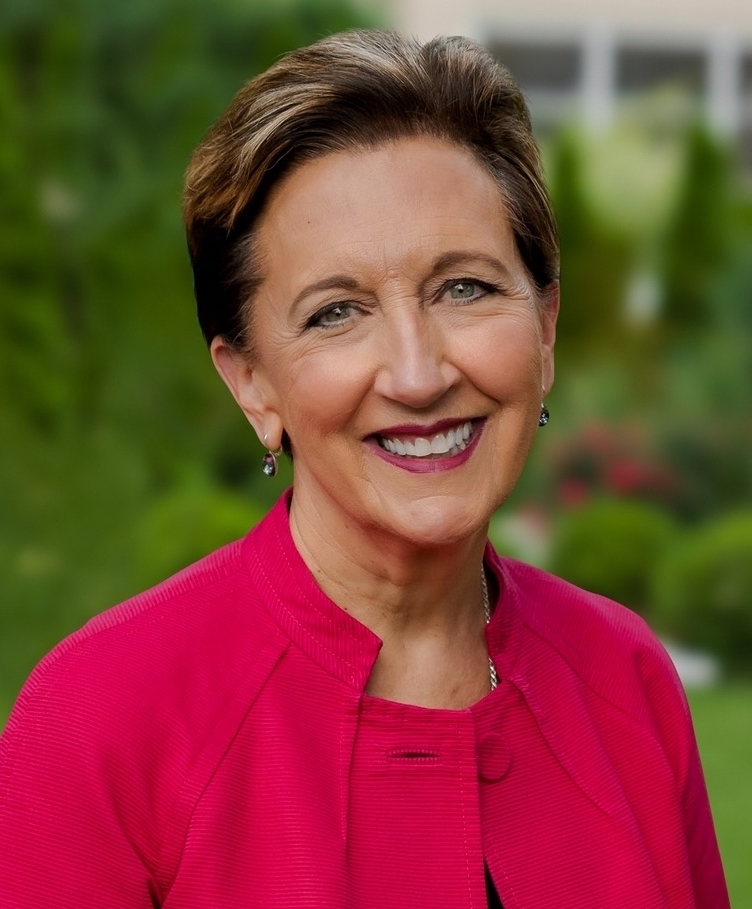

Member of the Nebraska Legislature from the 28th district
- In office January 7, 2015 – January 4, 2023
- Preceded by: Bill Avery
- Succeeded by: Jane Raybould

Personal details
- Born: Patty Pansing; September 30, 1958 (age 67) Lincoln, Nebraska, U.S.
- Party: Republican (before 2008); Democratic (2008–present)
- Spouse: Loel Brooks (m. 1982)
- Children: 3
- Education: Colorado College (BA); University of Nebraska–Lincoln (JD)
- Website: Campaign website

Patty Pansing Brooks (born September 30, 1958) is an American attorney and politician who served as a member of the Nebraska Legislature from the 28th district. Elected in November 2014, she assumed office on January 7, 2015.

== Early life and education ==
Pansing Brooks was born on September 30, 1958, in Lincoln, Nebraska.

Pansing Brooks graduated from Lincoln Southeast High School in 1976. She earned a Bachelor of Arts degree in political science from Colorado College in 1980 and a Juris Doctor from the University of Nebraska College of Law in 1984.

== Nebraska Legislature ==
Pansing Brooks served on a number of Lincoln community boards, and co-chaired several fundraising efforts, including the raising of $9.6 million for the renovation of Centennial Mall and $6 million for Union Plaza. In 2006, she co-chaired a committee to promote voter approval of a $250 million Lincoln Public Schools bond; the measure passed with 63% of the vote.

=== 2014 election ===
==== 2014 primary ====
In June 2013, Pansing Brooks announced that she would run in the 2014 election for the Nebraska Legislature, from District 28 in south central Lincoln. The incumbent, Democrat Bill Avery, was barred by Nebraska's term-limits law from running for a third consecutive term.

Pansing Brooks was one of two Democrats in the four-way nonpartisan race; the other was Jeff Keidel, a real-estate investor and property manager who raised less than $5,000 for the race. Attorney Dallas Jones, a Republican, had been active in the Young Democrats during his college years, and had remained a member of the Democratic Party until 2000; he had subsequently served as the chair of the Lancaster County Republican Party. Physician Bob Rauner was an independent, who described himself as conservative on economic matters and more liberal on social issues.

When the May 2014 primary election was held, Pansing Brooks led the field, with 3732 of the 7870 ballots cast, or 47.4%. Jones placed second, with 2459 votes, or 31.2%. Rauner obtained 1477 votes (18.8%), and Keidel placed last with 202 votes (2.6%).

==== 2014 general election ====
As the top two vote-getters in the nonpartisan primary, Pansing Brooks and Jones moved on to the general election. Both expressed their support for the proposed expansion of Medicaid in Nebraska under the provisions of the 2010 Affordable Care Act. Pansing Brooks declared that her priorities included "enhanced investment" in education, particularly from early childhood through high school; Jones also called for more spending on education, but emphasized vocational training and the university system. Both candidates expressed opposition to capital punishment. Pansing Brooks supported a ballot proposal to increase the minimum wage in Nebraska; Jones opposed it. Both candidates supported ending Nebraska's policy of denying driver's licenses to persons who were living in the United States illegally after having been brought to the country in childhood, and who were granted an exemption from deportation under the Barack Obama administration's Deferred Action for Childhood Arrivals (DACA) policy; however, Jones favored repeal of a state law offering in-state college tuition to such persons, while Pansing Brooks believed that the law should be kept.

Over the course of the entire legislative campaign, Pansing Brooks raised over $162,000 and spent over $173,000. Major contributors included the Nebraska State Education Association, which supplied over $15,000, and the Lincoln Education Association, which contributed $2,000; the Nebraska Association of Trial Attorneys, donating $4,000; and the Nebraska State Transportation United Transportation Union, which gave her campaign $3,000. The Jones campaign had total receipts of over $121,000, and spent over $138,000. Major contributors included the Nebraska Bankers Association, which furnished $5,100; the Greater Omaha Chamber of Commerce, providing $4,250, and the Nebraska Chamber of Commerce and Industry, providing over $3,500; and the Nebraska Farm Bureau Federation, contributing $4,000. Both candidates received contributions from the Nebraska Realtors: Pansing Brooks, a total of $3,000, and Jones, a total of $3,500.

When the November general election was held, Pansing Brooks received 7,481 votes, for 61.4% of the total; Jones received 4706 votes, or 38.6%.

=== 2018 election ===
Pansing Brooks ran unopposed for re-election.

== 2022 special and regular congressional elections ==
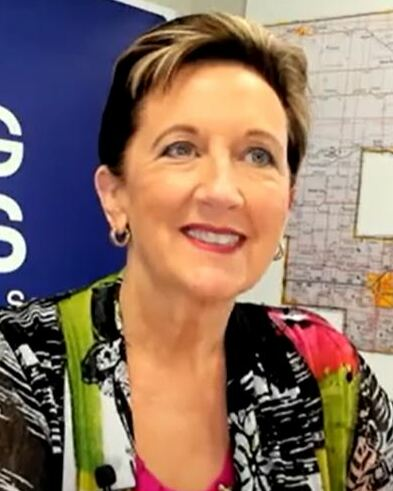
Pansing Brooks interviewed during her congressional campaign in May 2022

On November 15, 2021, Pansing Brooks launched a campaign to represent Nebraska's 1st congressional district in the 2022 election. The incumbent, Republican Jeff Fortenberry, resigned from office on March 31, 2022, following a felony conviction. Fortenberry's resignation necessitated a special election, for which the Nebraska Democratic Party selected Pansing Brooks as its nominee. She faced Republican nominee Mike Flood in the special election, which she lost with 47.31% of the vote. She subsequently faced Flood again in the regular election in November 2022 and also lost.

== Personal life ==
In 1982, Pansing Brooks married Loel P. Brooks. She has three children. In 1986, the two established the law firm of Brooks Pansing Brooks in Lincoln.

== Results ==
2014 Nebraska Legislature 28th district primary election
| Party | Candidate | Votes | % |
|---|---|---|---|
| Nonpartisan | Patty Pansing Brooks | 3,732 | 47.4 |
| Nonpartisan | Dallas Jones | 2,459 | 31.2 |
| Nonpartisan | Bob Rauner | 1,477 | 18.8 |
| Nonpartisan | Jeff Keidel | 202 | 2.6 |
| Total votes | | 7,870 | 100.0 |

2014 Nebraska Legislature 28th district general election
| Party | Candidate | Votes | % |
|---|---|---|---|
| Nonpartisan | Patty Pansing Brooks | 7,481 | 61.4 |
| Nonpartisan | Dallas Jones | 4,706 | 38.6 |
| Total votes | | 12,187 | 100.0 |

2018 Nebraska Legislature 28th district primary election
| Party | Candidate | Votes | % |
|---|---|---|---|
| Nonpartisan | Patty Pansing Brooks (incumbent) | 6,263 | 100.0 |
| Total votes | | 6,263 | 100.0 |

2018 Nebraska Legislature 28th district general election
| Party | Candidate | Votes | % |
|---|---|---|---|
| Nonpartisan | Patty Pansing Brooks (incumbent) | 11,717 | 100.0 |
| Total votes | | 11,717 | 100.0 |

2022 Nebraska's 1st congressional district special election
| Party | Candidate | Votes | % |
|---|---|---|---|
| Republican | Mike Flood | 61,017 | 52.69 |
| Democratic | Patty Pansing Brooks | 54,783 | 47.31 |
| Total votes | | 115,800 | 100.00 |

2022 Nebraska's 1st congressional district Democratic primary election
| Party | Candidate | Votes | % |
|---|---|---|---|
| Democratic | Patty Pansing Brooks | 31,808 | 86.6 |
| Democratic | Jazari Kual | 4,944 | 13.4 |
| Total votes | | 36,752 | 100.0 |

2022 Nebraska's 1st congressional district election
| Party | Candidate | Votes | % |
|---|---|---|---|
| Republican | Mike Flood (incumbent) | 129,236 | 57.9 |
| Democratic | Patty Pansing Brooks | 93,929 | 42.1 |
| Total votes | | 223,165 | 100.0 |
