= Main Street Caucus =

House of Representatives caucus

- Chair: Mike Flood (NE‑1)
- Vice Chair: Laurel Lee (FL‑15)
- Founded: September 2017 2021 (re-established)
- Dissolved: February 2019
- Ideology: Conservatism
- Political position: Center-right
- National affiliation: Republican Party
- Seats in the House Republican Conference: 91 / 219
- Seats in the House: 91 / 435

Website
- mainstreetcaucus.house.gov

The Main Street Caucus is a caucus of center-right members from the Republican Party in the House of Representatives. The caucus is currently made up of 91 members. The caucus is affiliated with Republican Main Street Partnership.

== History ==
=== Formation ===
In September 2017, the caucus was formed with Pat Tiberi (OH–12) as chair. Upon its formation, the caucus stated that it would prioritize "'strong, conservative principles related to economic and national security policy'". Tiberi added, "'We are focused on getting things done and delivering real results to the American people'". After Tiberi resigned from the House in 2018, Rodney Davis (IL–13) took over duties as chair.

=== Dissolution ===
In the 2018 House elections, the caucus lost 18 incumbent members. On November 28, 2018, the Caucus met with the Republican Main Street Partnership to ask why the partnership's super PAC had left $722,000 of its funds unspent. The partnership's chief executive officer, Sarah Chamberlain, said that it had spent $6 million on 2018 campaigns and set aside the remaining $722,000 for 2020. Members of the caucus expressed concern that Chamberlain's compensation was 20 percent of the partnership's operating expenses.

The caucus shares the name of Republican Main Street with Republican Main Street Partnership, but they aren't officially or legally connected to each other. In December 2018, the caucus voted unanimously to suspend political activity with the partnership until an independent audit of the partnership's governance could be conducted. The partnership declined to be audited. An NPR story about the turmoil involving the partnership led to litigation. The caucus members voted to dissolve the caucus in February 2019.

=== Re-establishment ===
By 2021, the Caucus had been re-established. As of 2023, it had once again become one of the major Republican caucuses in the House of Representatives.

== Ideology ==
The caucus is positioned as center-right on the political spectrum.

The caucus is made up of both moderates and party-line Republicans and is considered "mainstream".

== Leadership ==
=== Current ===
Chair: Mike Flood (R‑NE‑2)

Vice Chair: Laurel Lee (R‑FL‑15)

Executive Board:

- Stephanie Bice (R‑OK‑5)
- Carlos Gimenez (R‑FL‑28)
- Nathaniel Moran (R‑TX‑1)
- Zach Nunn (R‑IA‑3)

=== List of chairs ===
Start	End	Chair(s)	District
September 8, 2017	November 2017	Pat Tiberi	OH-12
November 2017	January 3, 2021	Rodney Davis	IL-13
January 3, 2021	January 3, 2023	Don Bacon	NE-02
January 3, 2021	January 3, 2023	Mike Bost	IL-12
January 3, 2021	January 3, 2023	Pete Stauber	MN-08
January 3, 2023	July 22, 2025	Dusty Johnson	SD-AL
July 22, 2025	present	Mike Flood	NE-01

== Membership ==
=== Electoral results ===
Starting membership in election cycles
Election year	Republican seats	±
2022	67 / 222 (Plus one non-voting delegate)	Steady
2024	81 / 220	▲14

=== Current members ===
The caucus is made up of 91 members.

State	District	CPVI	Member	Also a member of	Notes
Arizona	AZ-06	EVEN	Juan Ciscomani		Lost re-election
Arkansas	AR-02	R+8	French Hill		
California	CA-20	R+16	Vince Fong		
California	CA-22	D+1	David Valadao	Problem Solvers Caucus	Lost re-election
California	CA-23	R+9	Jay Obernolte		
California	CA-40	R+6	Young Kim		Lost re-election
California	CA-40	R+6	Ken Calvert		
California	CA-48	D+2	Darrell Issa		Retiring
Colorado	CO-03	R+5	Jeff Hurd		
Colorado	CO-05	R+5	Jeff Crank		Lost re-election
Colorado	CO-08	EVEN	Gabe Evans		Lost re-election
Florida	FL-04	R+5	Aaron Bean		
Florida	FL-05	R+10	John Rutherford		
Florida	FL-08	R+8	Mike Haridopolos		
Florida	FL-15	R+9	Laurel Lee		
Florida	FL-26	R+7	Mario Díaz-Balart		
Florida	FL-27	R+6	María Elvira Salazar		
Florida	FL-28	R+10	Carlos A. Gimenez		
Georgia	GA-01	R+8	Buddy Carter		Retiring
Idaho	ID-02	R+13	Mike Simpson		
Illinois	IL-12	R+22	Mike Bost		
Indiana	IN-04	R+15	Jim Baird		
Indiana	IN-04	R+16	Jefferson Shreve		
Indiana	IN-08	R+18	Mark Messmer		
Indiana	IN-09	R+15	Erin Houchin		
Kansas	KS-02	R+10	Derek Schmidt		
Louisiana	LA-05	R+17	Julia Letlow		Retiring
Michigan	MI-02	R+15	John Moolenaar		
Michigan	MI-04	R+3	Bill Huizenga		Lost re-election
Michigan	MI-07	EVEN	Tom Barrett		Lost re-election
Michigan	MI-09	R+16	Lisa McClain		
Michigan	MI-10	R+3	John James		Retiring
Minnesota	MN-01	R+6	Brad Finstad		Lost re-election
Minnesota	MN-07	R+18	Michelle Fischbach		
Minnesota	MN-08	R+7	Peter Stauber		
Mississippi	MS-03	R+14	Michael Guest		
Missouri	MO-04	R+21	Mark Alford		
Montana	MT-02	R+15	Troy Downing		
Nebraska	NE-01	R+6	Mike Flood		Chair
Nebraska	NE-02	D+3	Don Bacon		Retiring
New Jersey	NJ-07	EVEN	Thomas Kean Jr.		Lost re-election
New York	NY-01	R+4	Nick LaLota		
New York	NY-02	R+6	Andrew Garbarino		
New York	NY-11	R+10	Nicole Malliotakis		
New York	NY-17	D+1	Mike Lawler		Lost re-election
New York	NY-21	R+10	Elise Stefanik		Retiring
New York	NY-23	R+10	Nick Langworthy		
North Carolina	NC-03	R+6	Greg Murphy		Lost re-election
North Carolina	NC-07	R+7	David Rouzer		
North Carolina	NC-11	R+5	Chuck Edwards		Withdrew nomination
North Carolina	NC-14	R+8	Tim Moore		Lost re-election
North Dakota	ND-AL	R+18	Julie Fedorchak		
Ohio	OH-02	R+21	David Taylor		
Ohio	OH-06	R+17	Michael Rulli		
Ohio	OH-10	R+4	Mike Turner		Lost re-election
Ohio	OH-14	R+10	David Joyce		
Ohio	OH-15	R+5	Mike Carey		Lost re-election
Oklahoma	OK-05	R+9	Stephanie Bice		
Oregon	OR-05	R+14	Cliff Bentz		
Pennsylvania	PA-01	D+1	Brian Fitzpatrick		Lost re-election
Pennsylvania	PA-07	R+1	Ryan Mackenzie		Lost re-election
Pennsylvania	PA-08	R+4	Rob Bresnahan		Lost re-election
Pennsylvania	PA-09	R+19	Dan Meuser		
Pennsylvania	PA-14	R+17	Guy Reschenthaler		
South Dakota	SD-AL	R+15	Dusty Johnson		Retiring
Tennessee	TN-07	R+11	Matt Van Epps		
Texas	TX-01	R+24	Nathaniel Moran		
Texas	TX-02	R+11	Dan Crenshaw		Lost renomination
Texas	TX-06	R+11	Jake Ellzey		
Texas	TX-10	R+10	Michael McCaul		Retiring
Texas	TX-12	R+11	Craig Goldman		
Texas	TX-15	R+7	Monica De La Cruz		Lost re-election
Texas	TX-17	R+10	Pete Sessions		
Utah	UT-02	R+15	Blake Moore		
Utah	UT-03	R+21	Celeste Maloy		
Utah	UT-04	R+17	Mike Kennedy		
Virginia	VA-01	R+3	Rob Wittman		Lost re-election
Virginia	VA-02	EVEN	Jen Kiggans		Lost re-election
Virginia	VA-05	R+6	John McGuire		
Washington	WA-04	R+10	Dan Newhouse		Retiring
Washington	WA-05	R+5	Michael Baumgartner		
West Virginia	WV-01	R+22	Carol Miller		
Wisconsin	WI-01	R+2	Bryan Steil		Lost re-election
Wisconsin	WI-03	R+3	Derrick Van Orden		Lost re-election
Wisconsin	WI-08	R+8	Tony Wied		

== See also ==
- Blue Dog Coalition
- Freedom Caucus
- Liberty Caucus
- New Democrat Coalition
- Republican Study Committee
- Tea Party Caucus
- Republican Governance Group
