= Bill Avery =

American politician (born 1942)

Member of the Lancaster County Board of Commissioners from the 3rd district
- In office 2014–2019
- Preceded by: Jane Raybould
- Succeeded by: Sean Flowerday

Member of the Nebraska Legislature from the 28th district
- In office 2007–2015
- Preceded by: Chris Beutler
- Succeeded by: Patty Pansing Brooks

Personal details
- Born: February 7, 1942 (age 84) Harnett County, North Carolina, U.S.
- Party: Democratic
- Education: University of Tennessee (BS, MA); Tulane University (PhD)

William P. "Bill" Avery (born February 7, 1942) is a politician from the state of Nebraska in the Midwestern United States. He served two terms in the Nebraska Legislature, from 2007 to 2015. Avery is a retired adjunct professor of political science who specializes in international trade and foreign relations.

Born in Harnett County, North Carolina, he received his BS and M.A. from the University of Tennessee and his PhD from Tulane University. He is a professor emeritus at the University of Nebraska–Lincoln.

He was elected to the Legislature in 2006 representing Nebraska's 28th legislative district. He served on the Education Committee and the Government, Military and Veterans Affairs Committee, which he chaired. In 1991, Avery was elected to the Common Cause National Governing Board.
