= Republican Main Street Partnership =

Moderate Republican fundraising organization

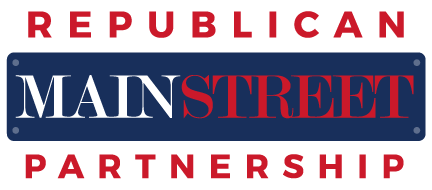
- Type: 501(c)(4)
- Founded: May 1994; 32 years ago
- Headquarters: Washington, D.C., U.S.
- Key people: Sarah Chamberlain (President, CEO)
- Revenue: US$1.8 million (2022)
- Net income: US$416.7 thousand (2022)
- Website: republicanmainstreet.org

The Republican Main Street Partnership is a nonprofit organization initially founded to raise funds for politicians on the moderate wing of the Republican Party. As of 2024, the organization has moved to the right. The Republican Main Street Partnership does not advocate for legislation but offers networking and mentorship opportunities and provides a forum for discussion. The partnership affiliates with a super PAC called Defending Main Street. The partnership also affiliates with the Main Street Caucus, a Republican congressional member organization that takes moderately conservative positions.

== History ==
=== Formation and activity ===
Rep. Amo Houghton of New York was the founder and chairman emeritus of the Republican Main Street Partnership.

The partnership was formed following the 1994 United States House of Representatives elections in which conservative Republicans gained the House majority for the first time in 42 years. An informal discussion group formed by representatives Nancy Johnson, Steve Gunderson, and Fred Upton later became an organized bloc intent on representing the moderate wing of the Republican Party. The partnership has described itself as a "broad alliance of conservative, governing Republicans".

In 2004, the Republican Main Street Partnership proposed changes that would have moved the Republican Party's platform regarding abortion and stem-cell research in a moderate direction.

Members of Congress affiliated with the partnership have been challenged in Republican primaries by members from the Club for Growth, FreedomWorks, and the Tea Party movement, among others. The partnership had a notably adversarial relationship with the fiscally conservative Club for Growth. In 2011, however, the director of the partnership stated that the two groups had "'come to an understanding'".

The partnership affiliates with a super PAC called Defending Main Street.

==== Shift to the right ====
According to an article published in the New York Times in March 2024, the organization was moving to the political right. "The Republican Main Street Partnership ...directed half a million dollars...to defeat Representative Bob Good, a hard-right lawmaker from Virginia, making an unusual push to oust a sitting Republican member of Congress. The move [wa]s notable... because the candidate it [wa]s backing — John J. McGuire, a former member of the Navy SEALs and an election denier who has pledged fealty to former president Donald J. Trump and promised to bring a "biblical worldview" to Congress — bears so little resemblance to the kind of moderate Republican the Main Street Partnership was founded to support."

== Affiliated members ==
Republican Main Street Partnership Group in the 118th United States Congress

As of September 2026, the partnership listed nine U.S. senators and all 91 members of the Main Street Caucus as being affiliated with it.

=== U.S. senators ===
- Joni Ernst (IA) (Retiring at the end of the 119th Congress).
- Todd Young (IN)
- Roger Marshall (KS)
- Susan Collins (ME)
- Tim Sheehy (MT)
- John Curtis (UT)
- Jim Justice (WV)
- Shelley Moore Capito (WV)

== Former members ==
=== Representatives ===
- Kelly Armstrong, North Dakota (retired in 2024)
- Larry Bucshon, Indiana (retired in 2024)
- Michael C. Burgess, Texas (retired in 2024)
- Ken Calvert, California (disaffiliated)
- Joseph Cao, Louisiana (lost reelection in 2010)
- Mike Castle, Delaware (retired to run for United States Senate in 2010 unsuccessfully)
- Lori Chavez-DeRemer, Oregon (lost reelection in 2024)
- Mike Coffman, Colorado (lost reelection in 2018)
- Barbara Comstock, Virginia (lost reelection in 2018)
- Ryan Costello, Pennsylvania (retired in 2018)
- Carlos Curbelo, Florida (lost reelection in 2018)
- Rodney Davis, Illinois (disaffiliated)
- Anthony D'Esposito, New York (lost reelection in 2024)
- Charlie Dent, Pennsylvania (resigned in 2018)
- John Duarte, California (lost reelection in 2024)
- Mike Fitzpatrick, Pennsylvania (retired in 2016)
- Bob Gibbs, Ohio (retired in 2022)
- Wayne Gilchrest, Maryland (lost renomination in 2008)
- Anthony Gonzalez, Ohio (retired in 2022)
- Jenniffer González-Colón, Puerto Rico (retired in 2024)
- Richard Hanna, New York (retired in 2016)
- Jamie Herrera Beutler, Washington (lost renomination in 2022)
- Will Hurd, Texas (retired in 2020)
- David Jolly, Florida (lost reelection in 2016)
- John Joyce, Pennsylvania (disaffiliated)
- John Katko, New York (retired in 2022)
- Mike Kelly, Pennsylvania (disaffiliated)
- Peter King, New York (retired in 2020)
- Adam Kinzinger, Illinois (retired in 2022)
- Frank LoBiondo, New Jersey (retired in 2018)
- Mia Love, Utah (lost reelection in 2018)
- Morgan Luttrell, Texas (disaffiliated)
- Tom MacArthur, New Jersey (lost reelection in 2018)
- Nancy Mace, South Carolina (disaffiliated)
- Michael McCaul, Texas (disaffiliated)
- David McKinley, West Virginia (lost renomination in 2022 due to redistricting)
- Peter Meijer Michigan (lost renomination in 2022)
- Marc Molinaro, New York (lost reelection in 2024)
- Erik Paulsen, Minnesota (lost reelection in 2018)
- Tom Petri, Wisconsin (retired in 2014)
- Bruce Poliquin, Maine (lost reelection in 2018)
- Jon Porter, Nevada (lost reelection in 2008)
- Tom Reed (NY–23) (announced retirement in 2022, then resigned early)
- Dave Reichert, Washington (retired in 2018)
- Jim Renacci, Ohio (retired to run for United States Senate in 2018 unsuccessfully)
- Scott Rigell, Virginia (retired in 2016)
- Ileana Ros-Lehtinen, Florida (retired in 2018)
- Michelle Steel, California (lost reelection in 2024)
- Elise Stefanik, New York (disaffiliated)
- Steve Stivers, Ohio (resigned in 2021)
- Scott Taylor, Virginia (lost reelection in 2018)
- Pat Tiberi, Ohio (resigned in 2017)
- Dave Trott, Michigan (retired in 2018)
- Fred Upton, Michigan (retired in 2022)
- Jeff Van Drew, New Jersey (disaffiliated)
- Greg Walden, Oregon (retired in 2020)
- Mimi Walters, California (lost reelection in 2018)
- Mike Waltz, Florida (disaffiliated)
- Brandon Williams, New York (lost reelection in 2024)
- Kevin Yoder, Kansas (lost reelection in 2018)
- David Young, Iowa (lost reelection in 2018)
- Lee Zeldin, New York (retired in 2022)
- Ryan Zinke, Montana (resigned to become United States Secretary of the Interior in 2017)

== See also ==
- Club for Growth
- Turning Point Action
