= Norm Wallman =

American politician (born 1938)

Member of the Nebraska Legislature from the 30th district
- In office 2007–2015
- Preceded by: Dennis Byars
- Succeeded by: Roy Baker

Personal details
- Born: Norman Wallman; February 6, 1938 (age 88) Gage County, Nebraska, U.S.
- Party: Democratic

Norman "Norm" Wallman (born February 6, 1938) is a politician from the state of Nebraska in the Midwestern United States. A resident of Cortland, Nebraska, Wallman served two terms in the unicameral Nebraska Legislature, from 2007 to 2015. He was born in Gage County, Nebraska.
