= Elaine Stuhr =

American politician

Elaine Stuhr (born 1936) is a politician from the state of Nebraska in the Midwestern United States. She served three terms in the Nebraska Legislature, from 1995 to 2007.

Stuhr was born on June 19, 1936, in Polk County, Nebraska and graduated from Thayer High School in 1954 and from the University of Nebraska–Lincoln in home economics education in 1969. She worked as an assistant instructor at the University of Nebraska–Lincoln, and as a teacher in Henderson and Hampton.

Stuhr was elected in 1994 to represent the 24th Nebraska legislative district and reelected in 1998 and 2002. She sat on the Education Committee and the Rules Committee, represented Nebraska on the Education Commission of the States, served as vice chair of the Natural Resources Committee, and chaired the Nebraska Retirement Systems Committee.

Under Nebraska's term-limits law, she was ineligible to run for re-election in 2006.
