= Center for Rural Affairs =

American nonprofit organization

Center For Rural Affairs
- Formation: Tax-exempt since February 1974; 51 years ago
- Type: 501(c)(3)
- Tax ID no.: 47-0553823; 47-0796719 (Center For Rural Affairs Community Capital)
- Headquarters: Lyons, Nebraska
- Total Assets: 20,038,427 USD
- Revenue: 14,752,357 USD (2024)
- Expenses: 9,896,780 USD (2024)
- Website: cfra.org

The Center for Rural Affairs was established in 1973 as an unaffiliated nonprofit corporation under IRS code 501(c)(3). The Center for Rural Affairs was formed by rural Nebraskans concerned about family farms and rural communities, and was originally located in Walthill, Nebraska.

The Center moved to Lyons, Nebraska, in 2003 where it continues to work on family farm and ranch issues and rural community development. The Center's strongest work has focused on rural micro-enterprise development in Nebraska, federal farm and rural policy, research and analysis of rural economic issues and trends, and, historically, its work with beginning farmers and ranchers.

Brian Depew is the current Executive Director of the Center for Rural Affairs. The previous Executive Director was Chuck Hassebrook, who the Democratic gubernatorial candidate for Governor of Nebraska in the 2014 election and briefly a candidate for the United States Senate in the 2012 election.

== History ==
In 1973, Don Ralston and Marty Strange were employed by the Goldenrod Hills Community Action Agency, a Nebraska non-profit corporation that was federally funded to eliminate poverty in five Northeast Nebraska counties. Don Ralston was Deputy Director and Marty Strange was a planner.

As part of a planning process involving citizen participation, Goldenrod Hills launched an agricultural redevelopment program aimed at stimulating alternative crop production (onions were a prime example) and conceiving alternative food system approaches, including a small-scale home canning center in Winnebago.

Advocacy efforts around agricultural issues were minimal. The initial staff included Laura Snake (later using her maiden name Whitewing), a Winnebago; Everett Kilzer, a long-time Walthill citizen with deep roots in the local economic system; and Lynn Spivak, who had been a VISTA volunteer with Goldenrod Hills.

In January 1973, newly re-elected President Richard Nixon decided to eliminate the federal anti-poverty programs that were the central funding source for Goldenrod Hills, and he appointed Howard Phillips to shut down the federal agency that distributed the funding. Phillips issued a lengthy instruction detailing how to close out operations.

The local reaction was strong. The Goldenrod Hills board was defiant with people like Art May, a community developer from Macy; Allen Heine, a prominent farmer/feeder from St. Helena; and Howard Swanson, a farm equipment dealer from Decatur.

As the Golden Hills Community Action Agency was not a federal body, the government lack any real power to shut down the organization. The staff was commissioned to build a survival strategy. Don Ralston and Marty Strange were commissioned by Larry Lassek, the Goldenrod Hills executive director, to develop a plan by which the service programs of Goldenrod Hills and the advocacy and development efforts might both be preserved.

May, Heine, and Swanson ultimately became those that incorporated the Center for Rural Affairs (CFRA), a separate entity from Golden Hills. With the primary goal of advocacy and development strategy, CFRA was designed to address controversial questions of economic policy affecting the agricultural base of Northeast Nebraska and to generate creative approaches to economic development. It was conceived and is largely funded privately.

== Lyons, Nebraska ==
The Center for Rural Affairs moved to rural community of Lyons, Nebraska, in 2003. Lyons is home to the Center for Rural Affairs, and is also home to the renewable energy company Nebraska Screw Press and the accompanying Nebraska Renewable Energy Systems and Nebraska Renewable Energy Association.
