= Mike Flood (politician) =

American politician (born 1975)

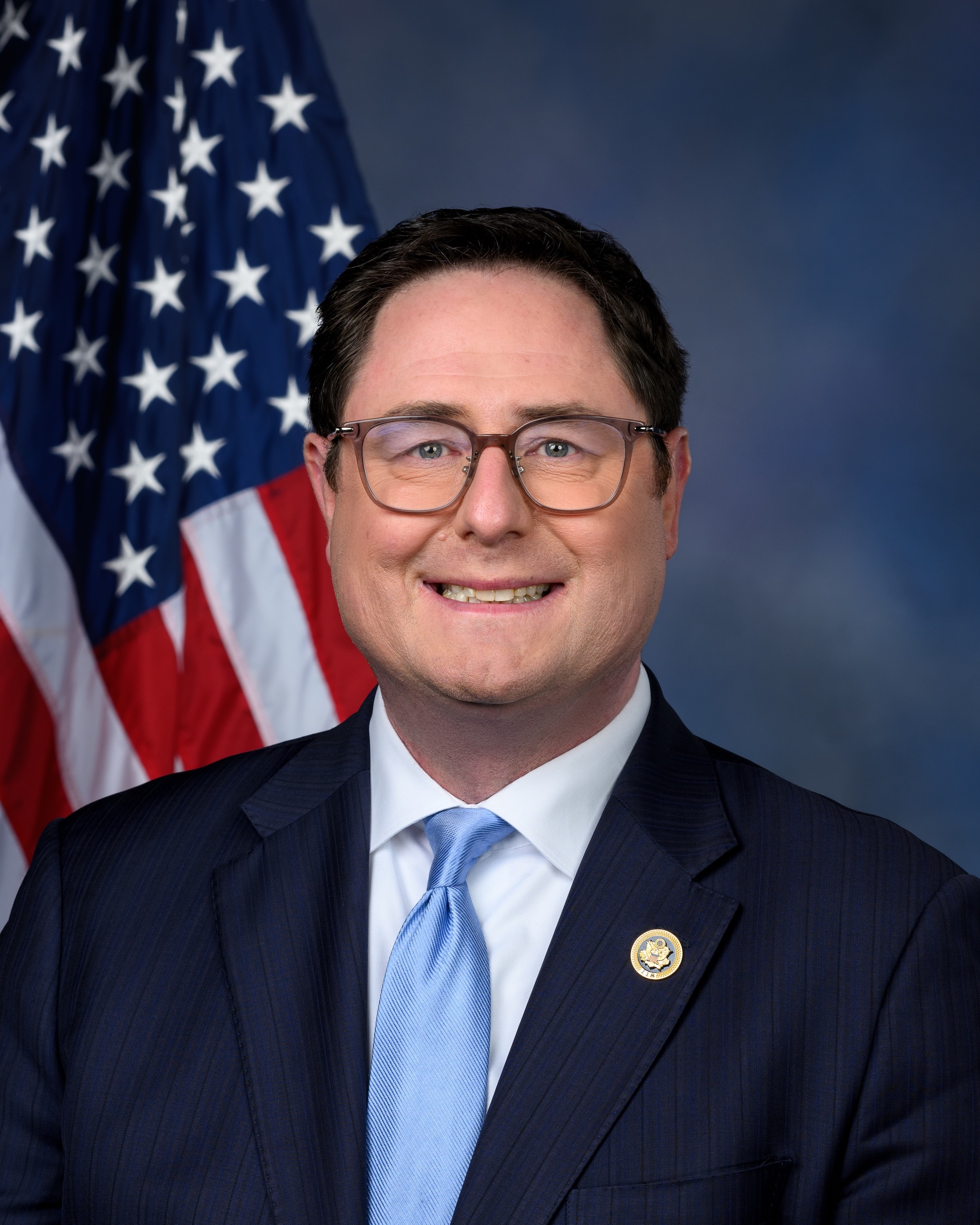
- Official portrait, 2024

Chair of the Main Street Caucus
- Incumbent
- Assumed office July 22, 2025
- Preceded by: Dusty Johnson

Member of the U.S. House of Representatives from Nebraska's 1st district
- Incumbent
- Assumed office June 28, 2022 (Note: Flood's official service begins on the date of the special election, while he was not sworn in until July 12, 2022.)
- Preceded by: Jeff Fortenberry

Speaker of the Nebraska Legislature
- In office January 3, 2007 – January 9, 2013
- Preceded by: Kermit Brashear
- Succeeded by: Greg Adams

Member of the Nebraska Legislature from the 19th district
- In office January 6, 2021 – July 11, 2022
- Preceded by: Jim Scheer
- Succeeded by: Rob Dover
- In office January 5, 2005 – January 9, 2013
- Preceded by: Gene Tyson
- Succeeded by: Jim Scheer

Personal details
- Born: Michael John Flood; February 23, 1975 (age 51) Omaha, Nebraska, U.S.
- Party: Republican
- Education: University of Notre Dame (BA); University of Nebraska–Lincoln (JD)
- Website: House website Campaign website

Michael John Flood (born February 23, 1975) is an American attorney, businessman, and politician serving as the U.S. representative for Nebraska's 1st congressional district since July 2022. A member of the Republican Party, he previously served two terms as a member of the Nebraska Legislature from the 19th district, from 2005 to 2013 and 2021 to 2022. He served as speaker of the legislature from 2007 to 2013.

== Early life, family education ==
Flood was born in Omaha, Nebraska. In 1993, he graduated from Norfolk Catholic High School in Norfolk. He received a Bachelor of Arts from the University of Notre Dame in 1997 and a Juris Doctor from the University of Nebraska College of Law in 2001.

== Career ==
Flood worked at a Norfolk radio station in high school. At the University of Notre Dame, he operated and hosted a show on the campus's radio station. After graduation, he worked as "Sideshow Mike" on WBYT's morning show for a year. Upon his return to Nebraska, he worked as a radio personality at Lincoln-based country station KFGE. In 1999, during his second year of law school, he launched KUSO as the first station in what would become Flood Communications.

As of 2023, he owned 15 radio stations and seven television stations in Nebraska. In 2015, Flood founded the News Channel Nebraska network, in which all television and radio stations participate. NCN is Nebraska's only 24-hour news channel. Flood no longer solely owns the stations, having sold parts of the company to in-state investors. In addition to being the operator of News Channel Nebraska, he was on-air talent, acting as a news reporter and hosting the variety show Quarantine Tonight during the COVID-19 pandemic.

== Nebraska Legislature ==
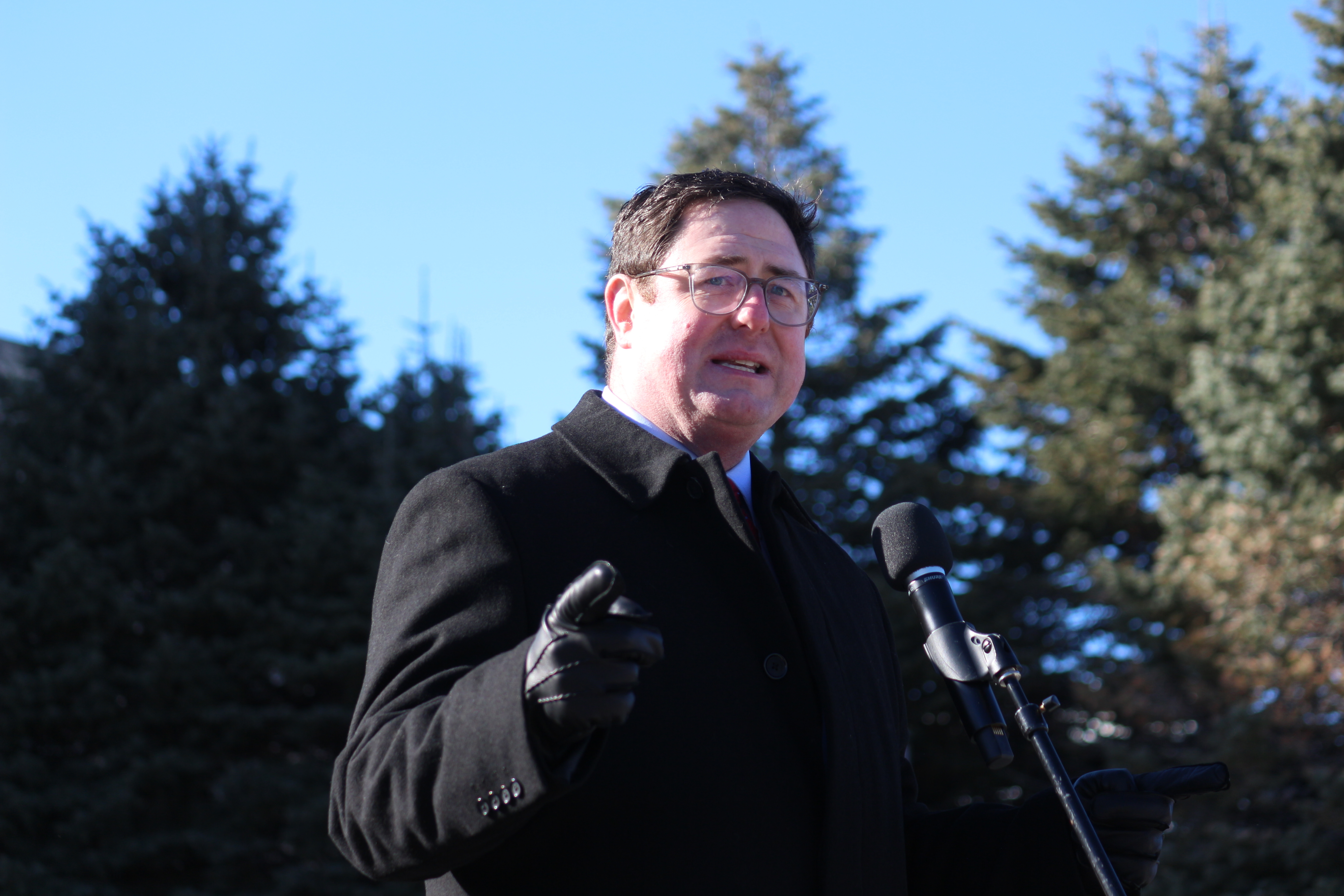
Flood speaking at the Walk for Life in Lincoln, Nebraska in January 2022

In 2004, Flood ran for a seat in the Nebraska Legislature, representing the 19th legislative district, which was coterminous with Madison County and included Norfolk. The incumbent, Gene Tyson, was retiring; Flood ran unopposed for the seat. In 2010, he was named to Time's "40 Under 40" list as one of the rising stars in American politics. During his first stint in the Nebraska Legislature, Flood introduced and successfully passed the Pain-Capable Unborn Child Protection Act, the nation's first 20-week abortion ban. During a special legislative session in 2011, he successfully brokered a compromise that rerouted the Keystone XL pipeline.

Flood left the Nebraska Legislature in 2013 due to term limits. He initially announced that he would run for governor in 2014, but withdrew from the race in December 2012 after his wife was diagnosed with breast cancer.

In August 2019, Flood announced he would run for office for the 2020 cycle in the 19th district, replacing Jim Scheer, who was termed out. Nebraska term limits only restrict consecutive terms. He was unopposed in the 2020 election, and returned to the Legislature for the 2021 legislative session.

== U.S. House of Representatives ==
=== Elections ===
==== 2022 special election ====
On January 16, 2022, Flood announced his candidacy in the 2022 United States House of Representatives elections in Nebraska, challenging the incumbent Republican Jeff Fortenberry to represent Nebraska's 1st congressional district. Fortenberry resigned from office on March 31, 2022, following a felony conviction. His resignation necessitated a special election, for which the Nebraska Republican Party nominated Flood. He defeated Democratic nominee Patty Pansing Brooks by a narrower than expected margin, 53%-47%.

==== 2022 ====
Flood was reelected in November, defeating Brooks in a rematch, 58%-42%.

==== 2024 ====
Flood was reelected, defeating Democrat Carol Blood, 60%-40%, winning every county in the district.

==== 2026 ====
Flood was unopposed in the Republican primary. He will face Democratic nominee Chris Backemeyer in the general election.

=== Tenure ===
Flood was sworn into office by Speaker of the House Nancy Pelosi on July 12, 2022.

In March 2024, it was reported that Flood had been pursued to serve as president of the University of Nebraska system. Flood declined the job to stay in Congress.

During a contentious 2025 town hall, Flood said, "I support Elon Musk and DOGE" amid questions from town hall participants about Musk's actions in government and conflicts of interest.

In July 2025, Flood was elected unanimously to serve as chair of the Main Street Caucus.

=== Committee assignments ===
For the 119th Congress:

- Committee on Financial Services
  - Subcommittee on Financial Institutions
  - Subcommittee on Housing and Insurance (Chairman)

=== Caucus memberships ===
- Congressional Ukraine Caucus
- Congressional Western Caucus
- Modern Agriculture Caucus
- Republican Study Committee
- Main Street Caucus

Political offices
Preceded by Kermit Brashear	Speaker of the Nebraska Legislature; 2007–2013	Succeeded by Greg Adams
U.S. House of Representatives
Preceded by Jeff Fortenberry	Member of the U.S. House of Representatives from Nebraska's 1st congressional district 2022–present	Incumbent
Party political offices
Preceded by Dusty Johnson	Chair of the Main Street Caucus; 2025–present	Incumbent
U.S. order of precedence (ceremonial)
Preceded by Mike Carey	United States representatives by seniority 286th	Succeeded by Brad Finstad
