= Roy Baker (politician) =

American politician

Member of the Nebraska Legislature from the 30th district
- In office 2015–2019
- Preceded by: Norm Wallman
- Succeeded by: Myron Dorn

Personal details
- Born: 1945 (age 80–81)
- Party: Republican
- Occupation: Consultant, retired superintendent of schools

Roy Baker (born 1945) is a politician from the state of Nebraska in the Midwestern United States. In 2014, he was elected to the Nebraska Legislature, representing a district in the southeastern part of the state. Baker is a member of the Republican Party.

== Personal life and professional career ==
Baker was born in 1945 in York, Nebraska. He graduated from high school in Benedict in 1963. He attended the University of Nebraska–Lincoln, receiving a B.S. in education in 1967, an M.Ed. in 1970, and an Ed.D. in 1977.

In 1968, Baker married Paula L. Vineyard; the couple eventually produced two children.

Baker worked as a teacher and a coach in Central City from 1968 to 1970. From 1970 to 1972, he taught, coached, and served as principal in Marquette. In 1972, he returned to his hometown of Benedict; there, he served as principal from 1972 to 1974, and then as superintendent of schools from 1974 to 1977.

In 1977, he moved to Arlington, where he served as superintendent of schools for eleven years. He moved to Harlan, Iowa in 1988, and held the position of superintendent of Harlan Community School District for nine years. In 1997, he returned to Nebraska to take up the post of superintendent at Norris School District 160, which covers portions of southern Lancaster County, northern Gage County, and western Otoe County.

In May 2004, a large tornado destroyed the village of Hallam and then struck the Norris campus, causing $35 million in damage to the school. Baker took charge of reconstruction efforts, declaring "In an extreme crisis such as this, authoritarian leadership is not only OK, it is most appropriate." By expediting contracting and construction, and through the use of portable classrooms, the school was able to re-open for the fall semester shortly after Labor Day. For his efforts, Baker was named Superintendent of the Year by the Nebraska Council of School Administrators.

Baker remained at Norris until 2010, when he retired. In that year, he co-founded Baker & Rastovski School Services, a consulting firm assisting schools in Nebraska to find, hire, and train administrators. In October 2012, following the death of the superintendent of Beatrice Public Schools, he was hired as interim superintendent for the remainder of the 2012–2013 school year.

== Political career ==
=== 2014 election ===
In September 2013, Baker announced that he would run for the Nebraska Legislature from District 30. The district, consisting of Gage County and part of southern Lancaster County, included the cities of Beatrice and Wymore, and portions of southern and western Lincoln. Incumbent Norm Wallman, a member of the Democratic Party, was barred by Nebraska's term-limits law from running for a third consecutive term.

A second candidate, like Baker a Republican, joined the race in February 2014. Bob Tiemann, the owner of a Beatrice construction firm, had sought the District 30 seat twice before. In 1982, he had come in last in a three-way primary, with 16.6% of the vote; in the 2010 primary election, he had again placed third of three, this time with 26.2% of the vote.

In the nonpartisan primary election, Tiemann received 3720 of the 7167 votes cast, or 51.9% of the total. Baker obtained 3447 votes, or 48.1%.

==== 2014 general election ====
Since only two candidates had run in the primary, both moved on to the general election. Baker declared "I don't breathe partisan fire", and stated that the Nebraska legislature was "officially nonpartisan, and I think it ought to stay that way". Tiemann stated that the district needed to elect a businessman who knew how to budget, and that a Gage County resident would better represent the district; Baker asserted that he had learned to manage on a limited budget as a school superintendent, and that he would be one of the few legislators who understood Nebraska's state-aid-to-schools formula.

On specific issues, Baker supported the proposed expansion of Medicaid in Nebraska under the provisions of the 2010 Affordable Care Act; Tiemann was inclined to oppose the expansion, lest the federal government renege on its pledge to reimburse states for the increased costs. Baker supported retaining a state law offering in-state tuition rates to persons who were residing illegally in the United States after being brought into the country as children, and who were granted an exemption from deportation under the Barack Obama administration's Deferred Action for Childhood Arrivals (DACA) program; Tiemann opposed this tuition policy. Tiemann favored retaining the state's policy of denying driver's licenses to DACA beneficiaries; Baker opposed the policy. Both candidates supported capital punishment, with reservations; both supported a ballot measure to increase the state's minimum wage.

Over the course of the whole campaign, Baker raised over $46,000 and spent over $50,000. Major contributors included the Nebraska State Education Association, which furnished $9,000; the Nebraska Hospital Association, which contributed $5,000; and the Associated General Contractors Highway Improvement PAC, which supplied $4,000. Tiemann raised almost $30,000 and spent the same. His major institutional contributors included the Nebraska Chamber of Commerce and Industry, which supplied over $5,000, and the Greater Omaha Chamber of Commerce, which furnished $1,000; the Nebraska Farm Bureau Federation, which contributed over $4,000; and the Nebraska Realtors, which provided $3,000. Tiemann also received $2,500 from Republican gubernatorial candidate Pete Ricketts. The Nebraska Bankers Association gave $2,500 to each campaign.

When the general election was held in November 2014, Baker received 6565 of the 11,712 votes cast, or 56.1% of the total. Tiemann obtained 5147 votes, or 43.9%.

=== Legislative tenure ===
==== 2015 session ====
In the 2015 session of the legislature, Baker was appointed to the Education Committee and the Health and Human Services Committee. He was one of three legislators named to represent Nebraska in the interstate Education Commission of the States.

Among the "most significant" actions taken by the Legislature in its 2015 session were three bills that passed over vetoes by governor Pete Ricketts. LB268 repealed the state's death penalty; LB623 reversed the state's previous policy of denying driver's licenses to beneficiaries of the DACA program; and LB610 increased the tax on gasoline to pay for repairs to roads and bridges. Baker voted in favor of the death-penalty repeal, and to override Ricketts's veto of the measure; he voted for passage of LB623, and to override the gubernatorial veto; and he voted for passage of the gas-tax increase, and to override the veto.

==== 2016 session ====
In its 2016 session, the Nebraska legislature passed three bills that Ricketts then vetoed. LB580 would have created an independent commission of citizens to draw new district maps following censuses; supporters described it as an attempt to de-politicize the redistricting process, while Ricketts maintained that the bill delegated the legislature's constitutional duty of redistricting to "an unelected and unaccountable board". Baker voted for the bill in its 29–15 passage. Sponsor John Murante opted not to seek an override of the governor's veto.

A second vetoed bill, LB935, would have changed state audit procedures. The bill passed by a margin of 37–8, with 4 present and not voting; Baker was among those voting in favor. The bill was withdrawn without an attempt to override the veto; the state auditor agreed to work with the governor on a new version for the next year's session.

A third bill passed over Ricketts's veto. LB947 made DACA beneficiaries eligible for commercial and professional licenses in Nebraska. The bill passed the Legislature on a vote of 33–11–5; the veto override passed 31–13–5. Baker voted for the bill, and for the override of Ricketts's veto.

The legislature failed to pass LB10, greatly desired by the Republican Party, which would have restored Nebraska to a winner-take-all scheme of allocating its electoral votes in U.S. presidential elections, rather than continuing its practice of awarding the electoral vote for each congressional district to the candidate who received the most votes in that district. Supporters were unable to break a filibuster; in the 32–17 cloture motion, Baker was among those who voted for the bill.
