= List of people from Wilmette, Illinois =

The following list includes notable people who were born or have lived in Wilmette, Illinois. For a similar list organized alphabetically by last name, see the category page People from Wilmette, Illinois.

== Academics and scientists ==
Name	Image	Birth	Death	Known for	Association	Reference
Ezekiel Emanuel		1957		Oncologist; developer of The Medical Directive: health policy adviser to the federal government		
Roger Myerson		March 29, 1951		2007 Nobel Memorial Prize in Economics co-winner		

== Acting and modeling ==
Name	Image	Birth	Death	Known for	Association	Reference
Ralph Bellamy		June 17, 1904	November 29, 1991	Academy Award-nominated actor	Grew up in Wilmette	
Beck Bennett		October 1, 1984		Actor, Saturday Night Live cast member	Born in Wilmette	
Neal Brennan		October 19, 1973		Comedian, writer, director, producer, actor	Lived in Wilmette as a child between 1978 and 1986	
Brian Doyle-Murray		October 31, 1945		Actor	Grew up in Wilmette	
Peter Fox				Actor	Born in Wilmette	
Charlton Heston		October 4, 1923	April 5, 2008	Academy Award-winning actor	Born in Wilmette	
Seana Kofoed		August 13, 1970		Actress	Born in Wilmette	
Virginia Madsen		September 11, 1961		Academy Award-nominated actress		
Crystal McCahill		December 18, 1983		Model; Playboy Playmate of the Month		
Bill Murray		September 21, 1950		Emmy-winning and Academy Award-nominated actor and comedian. Recipient of the Mark Twain Prize for American Humor.	Grew up in Wilmette	
Joel Murray		April 17, 1963		Actor	Born in Wilmette	
Hugh O'Brian		April 19, 1925	September 5, 2016	Emmy-nominated and Golden Globe-winning actor	Lived in Wilmette	
Ann-Margret Olsson		April 28, 1941		Actress and entertainer, winner of five Golden Globe Awards and an Emmy Award, nominated for two Academy Awards, two Grammys and a SAG Award	Lived in Wilmette	
Kevin Quinn		May 21, 1997		Actor	Grew up in Wilmette	
Jeri Ryan		February 22, 1968		American actress best known for her role as the Borg drone, Seven of Nine, in Star Trek: Voyager, lived in Wilmette	Lived in Wilmette	
Frazier Thomas		June 13, 1918	April 3, 1985	Chicago children's television personality, best known for Garfield Goose and Friends	Lived in Wilmette	
Nico Tortorella		July 30, 1988		Model and actor	Born in Wilmette	
Rainn Wilson		January 20, 1966		Emmy-nominated and SAG Award-winning actor; best known for role as Dwight Schrute on The Office.		

== Architects ==
Name	Image	Birth	Death	Known for	Association	Reference
Jens Jensen		September 13, 1860	October 1, 1951	Landscape architect. Served as the superintendent of the Chicago Park District	Lived in Wilmette	
Benjamin Marshall		May 5, 1874	June 19, 1940	Designed such buildings as the Drake Hotel	Lived in Wilmette	
Carol Ross Barney		1949		Principal architect at Ross Barney Architects	Lived in Wilmette	

== Business ==
Name	Image	Birth	Death	Known for	Association	Reference
James Crown		June 25, 1953		Businessman, son of Lester Crown and brother of Susan Crown, president of Henry Crown and Company, director of JPMorgan Chase, General Dynamics and Sara Lee Corporation, managing partner of Aspen Skiing Company	Grew up in Wilmette	
Lester Crown		June 7, 1925		Billionaire businessman, son of industrialist Henry Crown, father of James and Susan Crown	Lives in Wilmette	
Susan Crown		1958		Businesswoman, daughter of Lester Crown and sister of James Crown, chairman and founder of Susan Crown Exchange (SCE), chairman and CEO of Owl Creek Partners, chairman of Crown Family Philanthropies and partner of Henry Crown & Co., executive at Illinois Tool Works, board member of Northern Trust Corporation, vice-chair of Rush University Medical Center, former Fellow of Yale Corporation and board member of Baxter International	Grew up in Wilmette	
Ari Emanuel		March 29, 1961		Co-founder of Endeavor Talent Agency	Grew up in Wilmette	
Christie Hefner		November 8, 1952		Former CEO of Playboy, daughter of Hugh Hefner	Born in Wilmette	
James L. Kraft		December 11, 1874	February 16, 1953	Founder of Kraft Foods Inc	Lived in Wilmette	
Cary Kochman		April 1965		Co-head of Global Mergers and Acquisitions Group at Citigroup, head of Chicago Citi office	Lives in Wilmette	
Tony Rezko		1955		Restaurateur, political fundraiser convicted of fraud	Lived in Wilmette	
Laura Ricketts		December 15, 1967		Co-owner of Chicago Cubs; board member of Lambda Legal and Housing Opportunities for Women organization; daughter of TD Ameritrade founder Joe Ricketts	Lives in Wilmette	
Thomas S. Ricketts		May 23, 1963		Co-owner and chairman of Chicago Cubs; CEO of Incapital; director of TD Ameritrade Holding Company; son of TD Ameritrade founder Joe Ricketts	Lives in Wilmette	

== Chefs ==
Name	Image	Birth	Death	Known for	Association	Reference
Charlie Trotter		September 8, 1959	November 5, 2013	Chef and restaurant-owner	Born in Wilmette	

== Music ==
Name	Image	Birth	Death	Known for	Association	Reference
Casey Abrams		February 12, 1991		Singer and musician; finalist on American Idol season 10	Lived in Wilmette; attended McKenzie Elementary School	
Kristine Flaherty (a.k.a. K.Flay)		June 30, 1985		Rapper	Born in Wilmette	
Robbie Fulks		March 25, 1963		Alt-country singer and musician	Moved to Wilmette from Lindenhurst in 2005	
Sinéad O'Connor		December 8, 1966	July 26, 2023	Singer-songwriter	Lived in Wilmette for several months in 2016	
Matt Walker		May 1969		Drummer for Filter, The Smashing Pumpkins and Morrissey		
Wendy Warner				Celloist	Lived in Wilmette	
Pete Wentz		June 5, 1979		Bassist and primary lyricist for the band Fall Out Boy	Grew up in Wilmette	

== Photography ==
Name	Image	Birth	Death	Known for	Association	Reference
Vivian Maier		February 1, 1926	April 21, 2009	Street photographer	Lived as a nanny in Wilmette from 1989 until 1993	

== Politics ==
Name	Image	Birth	Death	Known for	Association	Reference
Esther Dunshee Bower		September 1879	October 13, 1962	lawyer, co-founder of Illinois League of Women Voters; worked almost 20 years for the state's Women's Jury Bill (1939)	Lived in Wilmette from 1880s to 1950s	
Michael Cabonargi		January 29, 1971		Commissioner of Cook County Board of Review from the 2nd district since 2011	Lives in Wilmette	
Rahm Emanuel		November 29, 1959		55th mayor of Chicago; White House Chief of Staff to President Barack Obama; senior advisor to President Bill Clinton, Democratic Caucus Chairman of the House of Representatives; Ambassador to Japan under President Joe Biden	Grew up in Wilmette	
Roger Keats		August 12, 1948		Former member of the Illinois House of Representatives	Lived in Wilmette	
Dean A. Pinkert		June 5, 1956		Served as a member of the International Trade Commission from 2007 until 2015	Grew up in Wilmette	
Todd Ricketts		September 23, 1969		Finance Chairman of the Republican National Committee. Was originally named by Donald Trump for nomination as the Deputy Secretary of Commerce but withdrew, unable to satisfy the U.S. Office of Government Ethics. Ricketts is a co-owner of the Chicago Cubs; owner of the shuttered Higher Gear Bike Shops chain; CEO of Ending Spending Super PAC; member of the World Bicycle Relief board of directors; son of TD Ameritrade founder Joe Ricketts.	Lives in Wilmette	
Michael S. Rogers		October 31, 1959		Former commander of the United States Cyber Command and Director of the National Security Agency	Grew up in Wilmette	
Jack Ryan		October 6, 1959		Candidate for the United States Senate	Grew up in Wilmette	
Dan Seals		June 19, 1971		Candidate for the United States House of Representatives	Lives in Wilmette	
Sargent Shriver		November 9, 1915	January 18, 2011	General manager of the Merchandise Mart; first head of the Peace Corps; vice presidential nominee for George McGovern's presidential campaign	Lived in Wilmette	

== Sports ==
Name	Image	Birth	Death	Known for	Association	Reference
Jack Brickhouse		January 24, 1917	August 6, 1998	Sportscaster for the Chicago Cubs	Lived in Wilmette	
Grant Golden		August 21, 1929	December 15, 2018	Tennis player	Born in Wilmette	
Barry Horowitz		March 24, 1960		Wrestler with WWE		
Jamie Schroeder		September 9, 1981		Olympic rower		
Mike Huff		August 11, 1963		Major League Baseball player	Grew up in Wilmette	
Bob Skelton		June 25, 1903	June 25, 1977	Gold medalist Olympic swimmer	Born in Wilmette	
Charlie Tilson		December 22, 1992		Major League Baseball player	Born in Wilmette	
Alex Vlasic		June 5, 2001		Defenseman in the National Hockey League	Born in Wilmette	
Alexander K. Whybrow (a.k.a. Larry Sweeney)		February 18, 1981	April 11, 2011	Wrestler and manager		
Tommy Wingels		April 12, 1988		Center in National Hockey League	Grew up in Wilmette	

== Writing and journalism ==
Name	Image	Birth	Death	Known for	Association	Reference
Julia Allison		February 28, 1981		Columnist	Born in Wilmette	
Mal Bellairs		November 9, 1919	July 12, 2010	Radio personality	Lived in Wilmette	
Robert Casey		March 14, 1890	December 5, 1962	Newspaper journalist	Lived in Wilmette	
Jamie Gilson		July 4, 1933	February 11, 2020	Author	Lived in Wilmette	
Edward Gorey		February 22, 1925	April 15, 2000	Writer/ illustrator	Grew up in Wilmette	
Chester Gould		November 20, 1900	May 11, 1985	Cartoonist; creator of Dick Tracy	Lived in Wilmette	
Blair Kamin				Pulitzer Prize-winning architecture critic for Chicago Tribune	Lives in Wilmette	
Linda MacLennan		May 25, 1956		Television news anchor and reporter (longtime personality on WBBM-TV)	Lived in Wilmette	
Brant Miller		February 8, 1950		Chief meteorologist at WMAQ-TV	Lives in Wilmette	
Marianne Murciano				Co-hosted Fox Thing in the Morning on WFLD	Lives in Wilmette	
Jonathan Nolan		Jun 6, 1976		British-American author and screenwriter		
Dana Olsen				Screenwriter	Lives in Wilmette	
Ian Punnett		March 3, 1960		Radio broadcaster	Born in Wilmette	
Bob Sirott		August 9, 1949		Radio broadcaster on WLS-AM, television news anchor	Lives in Wilmette	
Clark Weber		Nov 24, 1930	Mar 7, 2020	Radio broadcaster	Lives in Wilmette	
Donovan Webster		January 13, 1959		Best-selling and award-winning journalist, author, film-maker, and humanitarian	Grew up in Wilmette	
Paul O. Zelinsky		1953		Best-selling children's author/illustrator	Grew up in Wilmette	

== Other ==
Name	Image	Birth	Death	Known for	Association	Reference
Stephen Baltz		January 9, 1949	December 17, 1960	Sole survivor of the 1960 New York air disaster until dying a day later	Born and lived in Wilmette	
H. H. Holmes		May 16, 1861	May 7, 1896	Serial killer	Lived in Wilmette	
Antoine Ouilmette		1760	December 1, 1841	Fur trader who was among the earliest settlers of Chicago	Lived in Wilmette and is a member of the town's namesake family	
