= Jake Dobkin =

American journalist and blogger

- Born: Jacob Dobkin; New York City, U.S.
- Education: Columbia University (BA); New York University (MBA)
- Occupations: Journalist, publisher, author
- Employer: New York Public Radio
- Known for: Co-founding Gothamist

Jacob "Jake" Dobkin is an American journalist, blogger, author, and co-founder of Gothamist. He is currently a director of New York Public Radio.

== Biography ==
Dobkin is a native of New York City and grew up in Park Slope, Brooklyn. He graduated from Stuyvesant High School, attended Binghamton University, and graduated from Columbia University in 1998. He also received an MBA from New York University Stern School of Business in 2005.

Dobkin worked as an IT consultant when he co-founded the blog Gothamist in 2003 with his Columbia classmate, Jen Chung. He left his job to work for the blog full-time in 2005. In 2007 and 2008, he and Chung were named one of "New York's coolest tech people" by Business Insider.

He once criticized The New York Times prior to a panel with media critic David Carr, calling the paper's “old-fashioned reporting” out-of-touch with a younger generation of readers. New York magazine and Gawker claimed that his comments sabotaged the company's supposedly successful acquisition by James L. Dolan's media company Cablevision.

In 2017, Gothamist was purchased by DNAinfo, founded by conservative billionaire Joe Ricketts, and Dobkin was kept to run the blog. Ricketts shut down the site in November 2017 after writers voted to unionize. WNYC announced in 2018 that it has pooled the resources to buy the blog and hired Dobkin and Chung.

In 2013, he started a column called Ask a Native New Yorker, and adapted his columns into a book of the same name that was published in 2019. He is also a photographer of street art and urban landscapes.
