= Pete Ricketts =

American politician (born 1964)

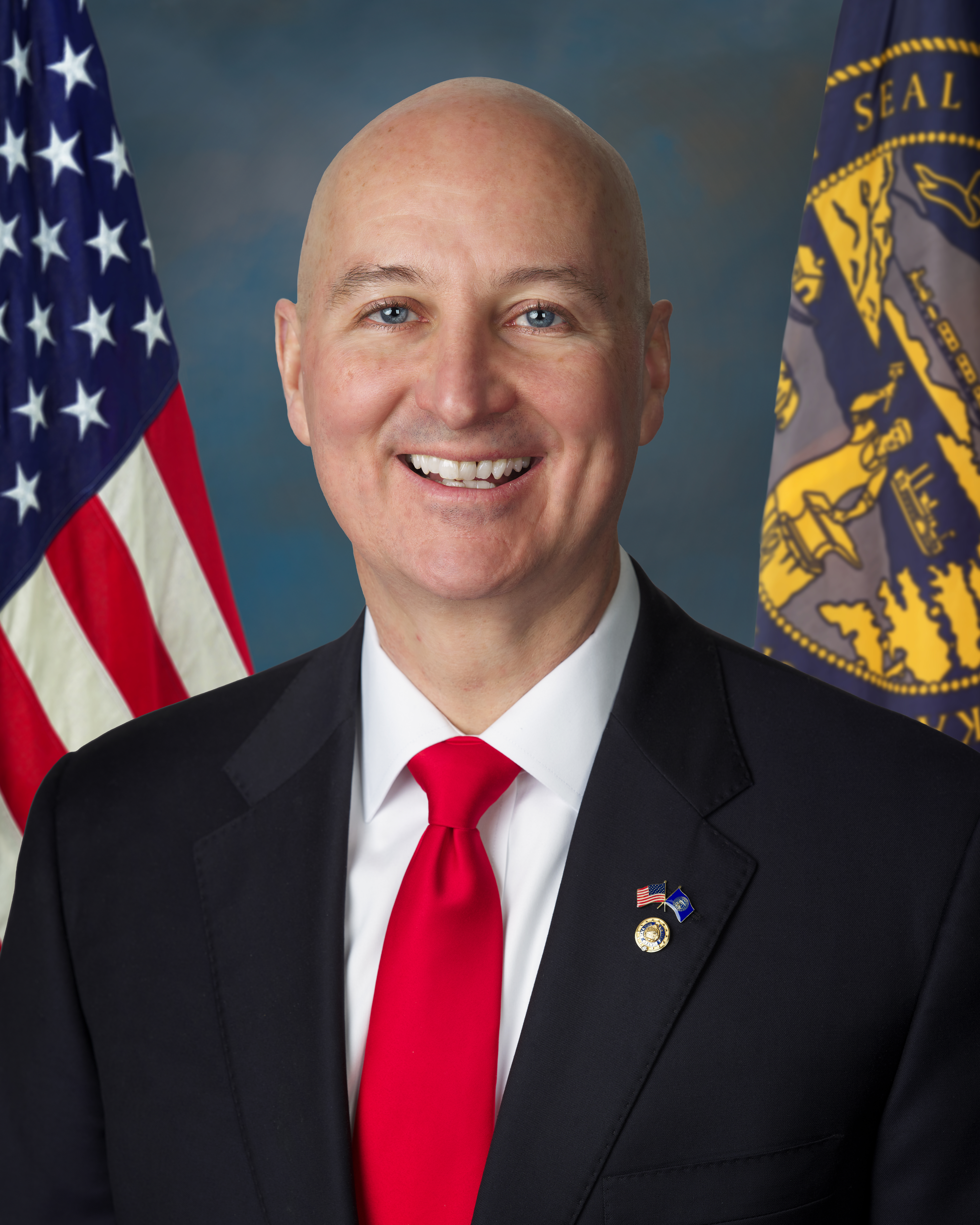
- Official portrait, 2023

United States Senator from Nebraska
- Incumbent
- Assumed office January 12, 2023 Serving with Deb Fischer
- Preceded by: Ben Sasse

40th Governor of Nebraska
- In office January 8, 2015 – January 5, 2023
- Lieutenant: Mike Foley
- Preceded by: Dave Heineman
- Succeeded by: Jim Pillen

Chair of the Republican Governors Association
- In office November 19, 2021 – November 17, 2022 Serving with Doug Ducey
- Preceded by: Doug Ducey
- Succeeded by: Kim Reynolds
- In office November 29, 2018 – November 21, 2019
- Preceded by: Bill Haslam
- Succeeded by: Greg Abbott

Personal details
- Born: John Peter Ricketts; August 19, 1964 (age 62) Nebraska City, Nebraska, U.S.
- Party: Republican
- Spouse: Susanne Shore (m. 1997)
- Children: 3
- Parent: Joe Ricketts (father)
- Relatives: Thomas S. Ricketts (brother); Laura Ricketts (sister); Todd Ricketts (brother)
- Education: University of Chicago (BA, MBA)
- Website: Senate website Campaign website
- Pete Ricketts's voice Pete Ricketts questions witnesses on Chinese-Latin American trade relations Recorded March 15, 2023

John Peter Ricketts (born August 19, 1964) is an American businessman and politician serving as the junior United States senator from Nebraska since 2023.

A member of the Republican Party, Ricketts served from 2015 to 2023 as the 40th governor of Nebraska. He ran for the U.S. Senate in 2006, losing to incumbent Ben Nelson. He ran for governor of Nebraska in 2014, and after narrowly winning the six-way Republican primary, won the general election. He was reelected in 2018.

Ricketts left office after his second term as governor expired on January 5, 2023; a week later he was appointed to the U.S. Senate by his gubernatorial successor, Jim Pillen, to fill the vacancy created by Ben Sasse's resignation. According to The New York Times, as of October 2026, his estimated net worth is $200 million, making him one of the wealthiest members of Congress. Ricketts won the election to complete Sasse's term in the 2024 special election, and was elected to a full term in 2026.

== Early life ==
Ricketts was born in Nebraska City on August 19, 1964, the oldest of four children of Joe Ricketts and Marlene (Volkmer) Ricketts. The family later moved to Omaha. Joe Ricketts founded First Omaha Securities in 1975, one of the first discount stockbrokers in the United States. It prospered, changing its name to Ameritrade, going public in 1997, and changing its name to TD Ameritrade after acquiring TD Waterhouse in 2006. Marlene was a teacher.

Ricketts and his siblings, Tom, Laura, and Todd, all attended Westside High School in Omaha, from which Ricketts graduated in 1982. He attended the University of Chicago, receiving a Bachelor of Arts in biology in 1986 and a Master of Business Administration in marketing and finance in 1991.

== Business career ==
After completing graduate school, Ricketts returned to Omaha. He worked for the Union Pacific Railroad for a year, then as a salesman for a Chicago environmental consultant. In 1993, he went to work for his father's business, initially in the call center for a few months, and subsequently appointed by his father to a number of executive positions, ultimately becoming the company's chief operating officer during his father's tenure as CEO. In a 2006 report, he stated his net worth at between $45 million and $50 million.

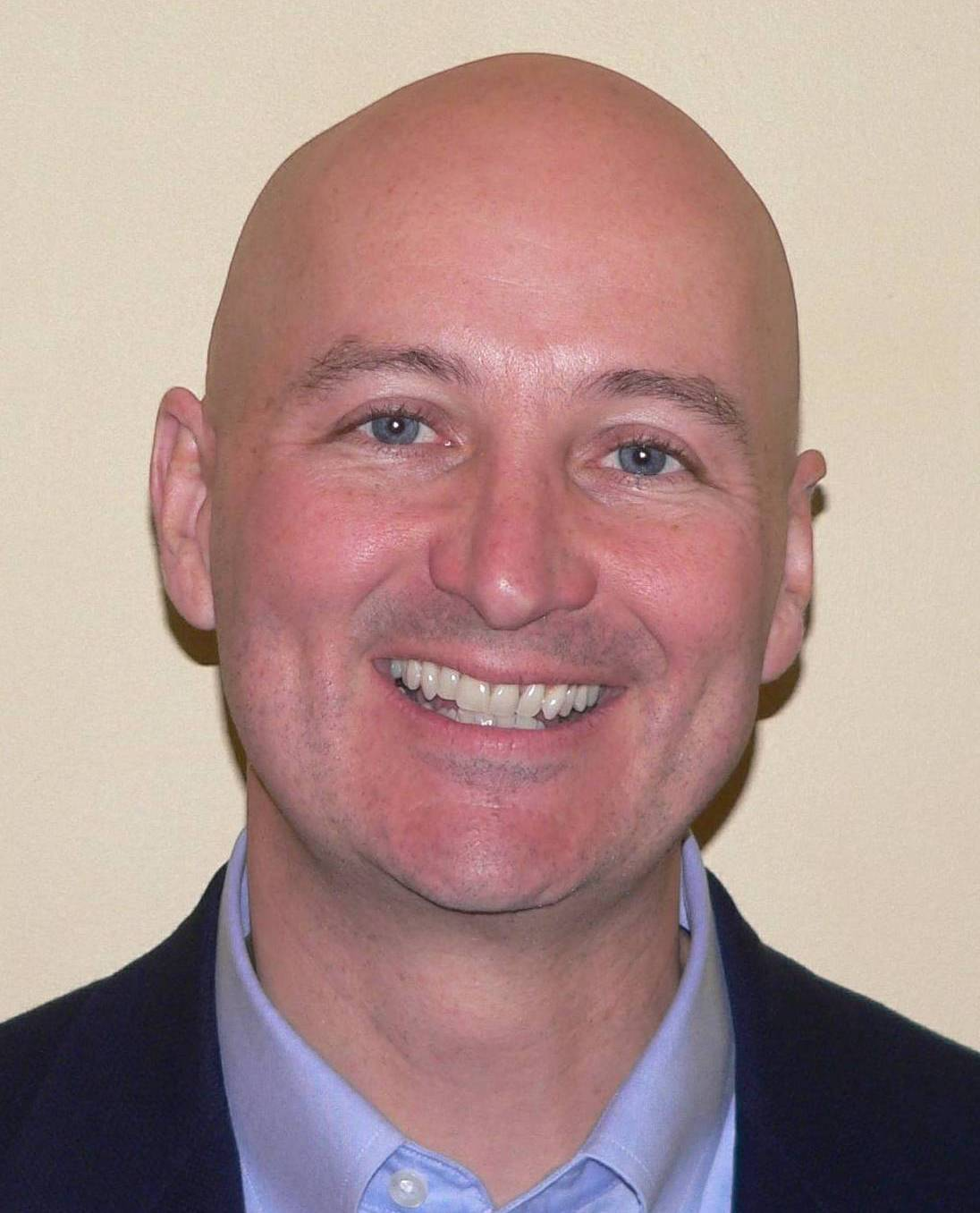
Ricketts in 2013

In 1997, Ricketts married Susanne Shore. A native of Garden City, Kansas, Shore grew up in Tulsa, Oklahoma, and earned a bachelor's degree in English and then an MBA from Oklahoma State University. After a stint working for the dean of students at the University of South Dakota, she came to Omaha to complete a one-year course in nursing at Creighton University. At the time of her marriage to Ricketts, she was working as a nurse at St. Joseph's Hospital in Omaha. Ricketts and Shore have three children.

In 2006, Ricketts left Ameritrade to run for the U.S. Senate. After his loss to incumbent Ben Nelson, he returned to the company's board, remaining until the Ricketts family relinquished its board seats in 2016.

In 2007, Ricketts co-founded, and became director and president of the Platte Institute for Economic Research, which he called a "free market think tank", and which Nebraska newspapers have called "conservative". He resigned from the organization in 2013 to concentrate on his 2014 gubernatorial campaign. From 2007 to 2012, Ricketts was a national committeeman for the Republican National Committee; from 2007 to 2013, he was a trustee of the American Enterprise Institute.

== Sports ==
In 2009, the Ricketts family trust bought the Chicago Cubs of Major League Baseball (MLB) from Tribune Media. Ricketts stepped down from the Cubs' board of directors in 2019 to focus on being governor.

As part owner of the Cubs, Ricketts has a 2016 World Series title to his credit, as they won the championship that year, defeating the Cleveland Indians.

== Governor of Nebraska (2015–2023) ==
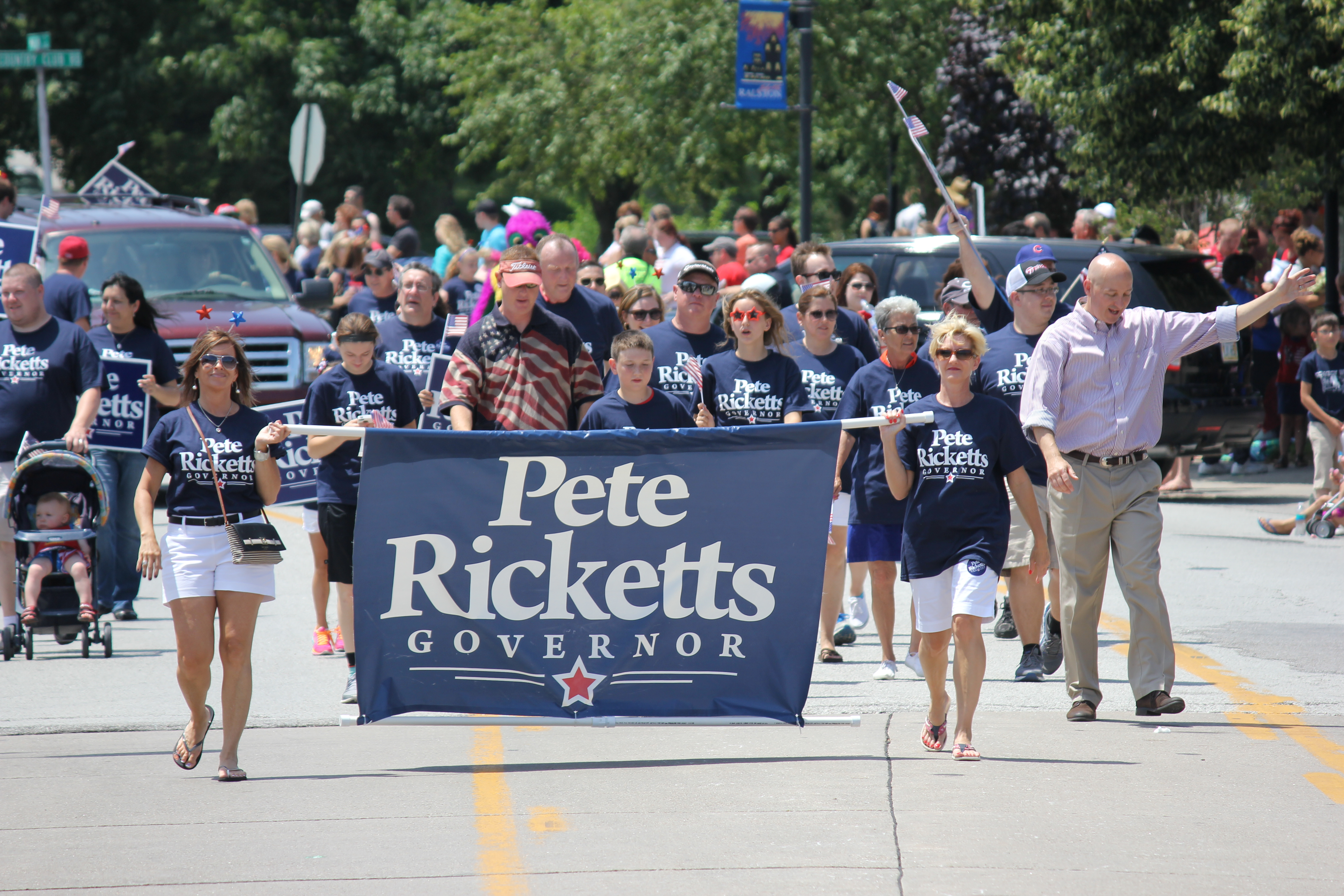
Ricketts campaigning for governor with a crowd of supporters, July 2014

=== Elections ===
==== 2014 ====
Final results by county in 2014: Pete Ricketts: 80–90%; 70–80%; 60–70%; 50–60%; 40–50%; Chuck Hassebrook: 50–60%; 40–50%

Ricketts ran in the 2014 Nebraska gubernatorial election. The incumbent, Dave Heineman, was term-limited. Two candidates considered strong contenders for the Republican nomination withdrew by early 2013: Lieutenant Governor Rick Sheehy, who was embroiled in a scandal; and Speaker of the Legislature Mike Flood, whose wife had been diagnosed with cancer. Ricketts joined the race in September 2013, at which point he and state auditor Mike Foley were regarded as the front-runners in a race that also included State Senators Charlie Janssen, Beau McCoy, and Tom Carlson. In February 2014, Janssen withdrew, and Nebraska Attorney General Jon Bruning declared his candidacy. Despite his late entrance, Bruning supplanted Ricketts as the perceived front-runner.

Ricketts won the May 2014 primary with 26.6% of the vote to Bruning's 25.5%, McCoy's 20.9%, Foley's 19.2%, Carlson's 4.1%, and Omaha attorney Bryan Slone's 3.7%. In the general election, Ricketts faced Democratic nominee Chuck Hassebrook, a former member of the University of Nebraska Board of Regents and former director of the Center for Rural Affairs. Ricketts advocated tax reductions; Hassebrook argued that Ricketts's proposed cuts would primarily benefit the rich and deprive the state of funds for what he called needed public services. Ricketts opposed the proposed expansion of Medicaid under the provisions of the 2010 Patient Protection and Affordable Care Act; Hassebrook favored the expansion. Ricketts opposed an increase in the state's minimum wage; Hassebrook supported it.

Ricketts outspent Hassebrook by a considerable margin. In the last spending report filed before the election, he said he had loaned his campaign $930,000, and that the organization had spent about $6 million. Hassebrook reported expenditures of slightly more than $2.5 million.

In the general election, Ricketts received 57.1% of the vote to Hassebrook's 39.2%. Libertarian Mark G. Elworth Jr. received 3.5%, and write-in votes accounted for 0.1%.

==== 2018 ====
Final results by county in 2018: Pete Ricketts: >90%; 80–90%; 70–80%; 60–70%; 50–60%; Bob Krist: 50–60%

On June 5, 2017, Ricketts announced his candidacy for reelection. During his speech, he said "lowering property taxes" would be his main concern if he were reelected. He also asked Nebraskans to "rehire" Lieutenant Governor Mike Foley. Ricketts was reelected on November 6 with 59.0% of the vote.

=== Tenure ===
Ricketts was inaugurated as the 40th governor of Nebraska at the Nebraska State Capitol on January 8, 2015.

==== 2015 session ====
Among the "most significant" actions the legislature took in its 2015 session were three bills that passed over Ricketts's veto. LB268 repealed the state's death penalty; LB623 reversed the state's previous policy of denying driver's licenses to people who were living illegally in the U.S. after being brought to the country as children, and who had been granted exemption from deportation under the Barack Obama administration's Deferred Action for Childhood Arrivals (DACA) program; and LB610 increased the tax on gasoline to pay for repairs to roads and bridges.

After Ricketts's veto of the death-penalty repeal was overridden, capital-punishment proponents launched a petition drive to reverse the legislature's action. Their efforts gathered enough signatures to suspend the repeal until a public vote could be held. Capital-punishment opponents then filed a lawsuit arguing that the petition should be invalidated on the grounds that Ricketts, who had contributed $200,000 to the campaign, was "the primary initiating force" for the petition drive and should have been included in the list of sponsors required by Nebraska law. In February 2016, a Lancaster County district judge dismissed the lawsuit, ruling that Ricketts's financial support of the petition effort did not ipso facto make him a sponsor. The plaintiffs appealed the issue to the Nebraska Supreme Court, which upheld the district court's dismissal. The referendum was held in the 2016 general election and the death penalty was retained with 61.2% of the vote.

==== 2016 session ====
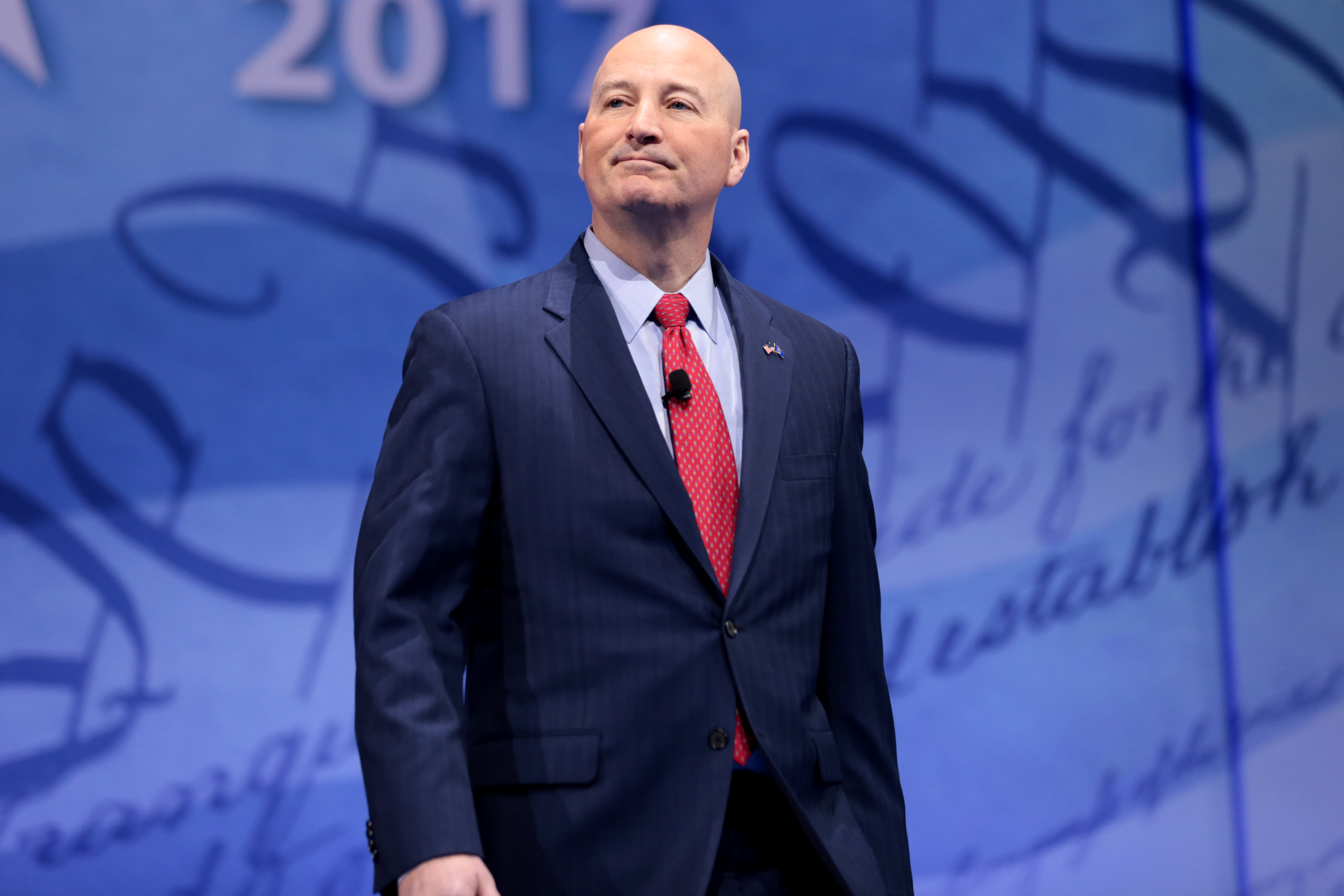
Ricketts speaking at CPAC, February 2017

In its 2016 session, the legislature passed three bills that Ricketts vetoed. LB580 would have created an independent commission of citizens to draw new district maps following censuses; supporters described it as an attempt to depoliticize the redistricting process, while Ricketts maintained that the bill delegated the legislature's constitutional duty of redistricting to "an unelected and unaccountable board". The bill's sponsor, John Murante, opted not to seek an override of the veto. A second vetoed bill, LB935, would have changed state audit procedures; it passed by a margin of 37–8, with 4 present and not voting. The bill was withdrawn without an attempt to override the veto; the state auditor agreed to work with Ricketts on a new version for the next year's session. A third bill, LB947, made DACA beneficiaries eligible for commercial and professional licenses in Nebraska. The bill passed the legislature on a vote of 33–11–5; the veto override passed 31–13–5.

At the 2016 Republican state convention, Ricketts denounced several legislators who had failed to support his and the party's positions on various bills, and called for the election of more "platform Republicans" to the officially nonpartisan legislature. In response to this, 13 legislators, including five registered Republicans, released a statement in which they accused Ricketts of placing partisanship above principle. One of the signers of the statement, Laura Ebke, changed her registration from Republican to Libertarian shortly thereafter, citing Ricketts's speech as one of the factors that drove her to make the change.

==== 2018 session ====
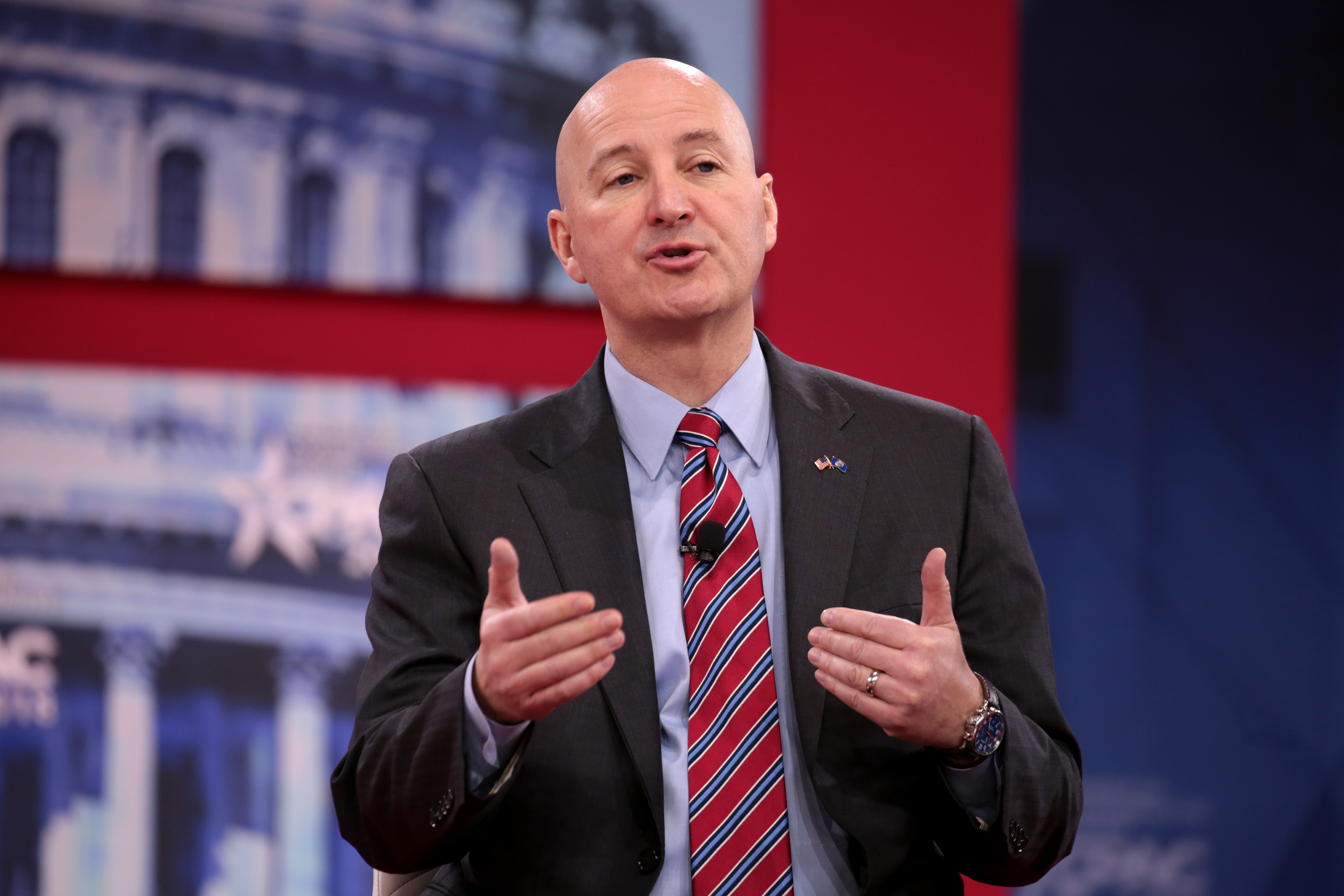
Ricketts speaking at CPAC, February 2018

At the start of the 2018–2019 session, Ricketts highlighted various bills as his priorities. In 2018, he signed LB 1040, which created commemorative certificates of nonviable birth for miscarriages. Ricketts said the bill "affirms the pre-born baby's dignity, [and] it also provides closure to mothers, fathers, and families who are grappling with the pain and heartache of losing a child". Ricketts also signed various property and tax relief bills during the session. He vetoed LB350, which would have allowed felons to petition a court to set aside their convictions after serving their sentences.

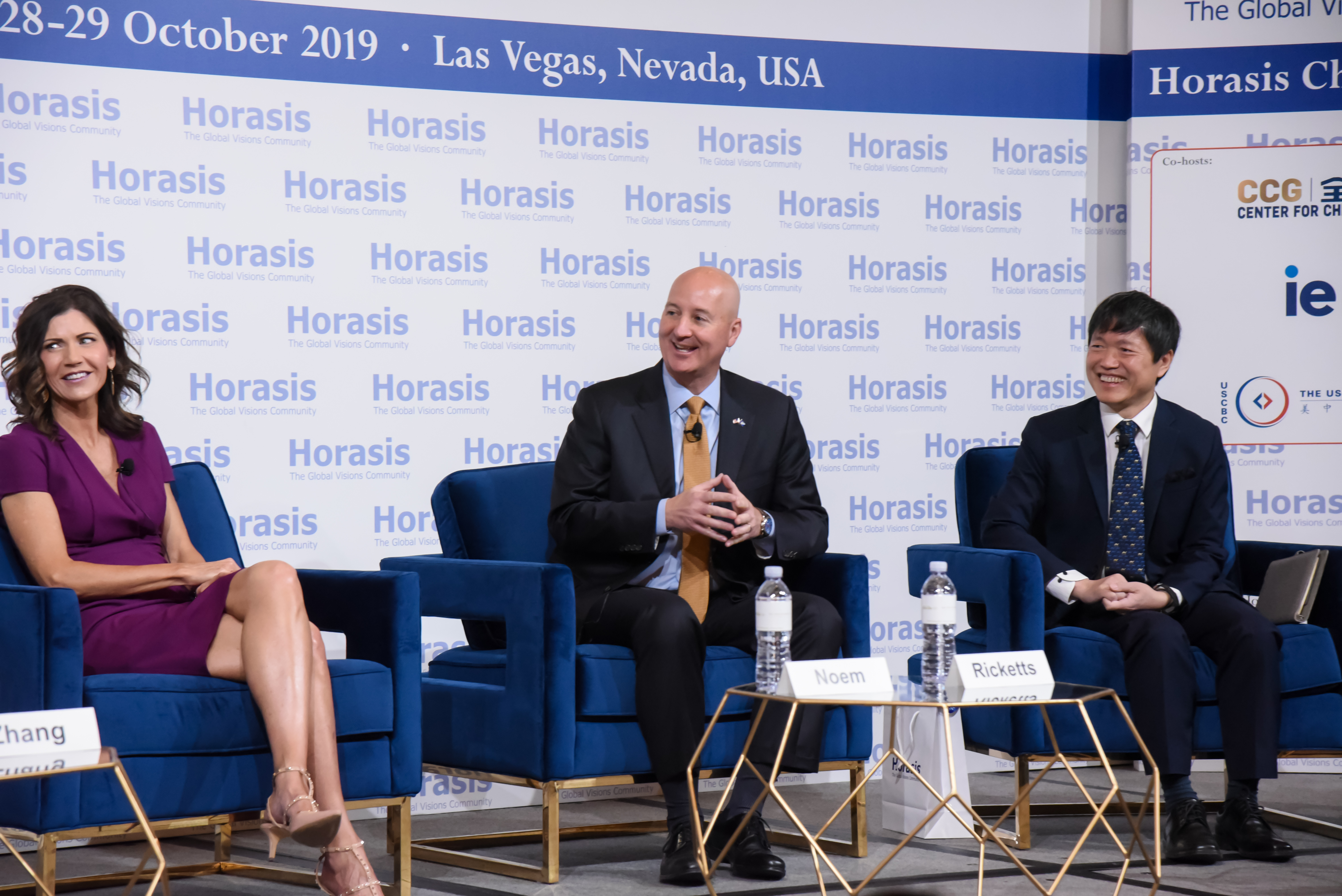
Ricketts with South Dakota Governor Kristi Noem in 2019

==== 2020 session ====
In 2020, Ricketts signed numerous laws passed by the legislature, including property and veterans tax relief bills, dismemberment abortion bans, and flood and pandemic relief. In 2020, Ricketts made some workforce reforms, providing a new partnership between Peru State College and the Nebraska Department of Corrections, to provide a path for students to go from the classroom into the corrections workforce. He also signed an infrastructure bill, funding repair of the Gering-Fort Laramie Irrigation Canal after it collapsed in 2019.

==== 2022 session ====
As governor, Ricketts chaired the Nebraska Board of Pardons. In 2022, the Board, with his support, pardoned John Arias, who was convicted of violent sexual assault; the case drew attention because of the nature of the offense and because the victim was not notified of the hearing or given an opportunity to testify.

COVID-19 pandemic

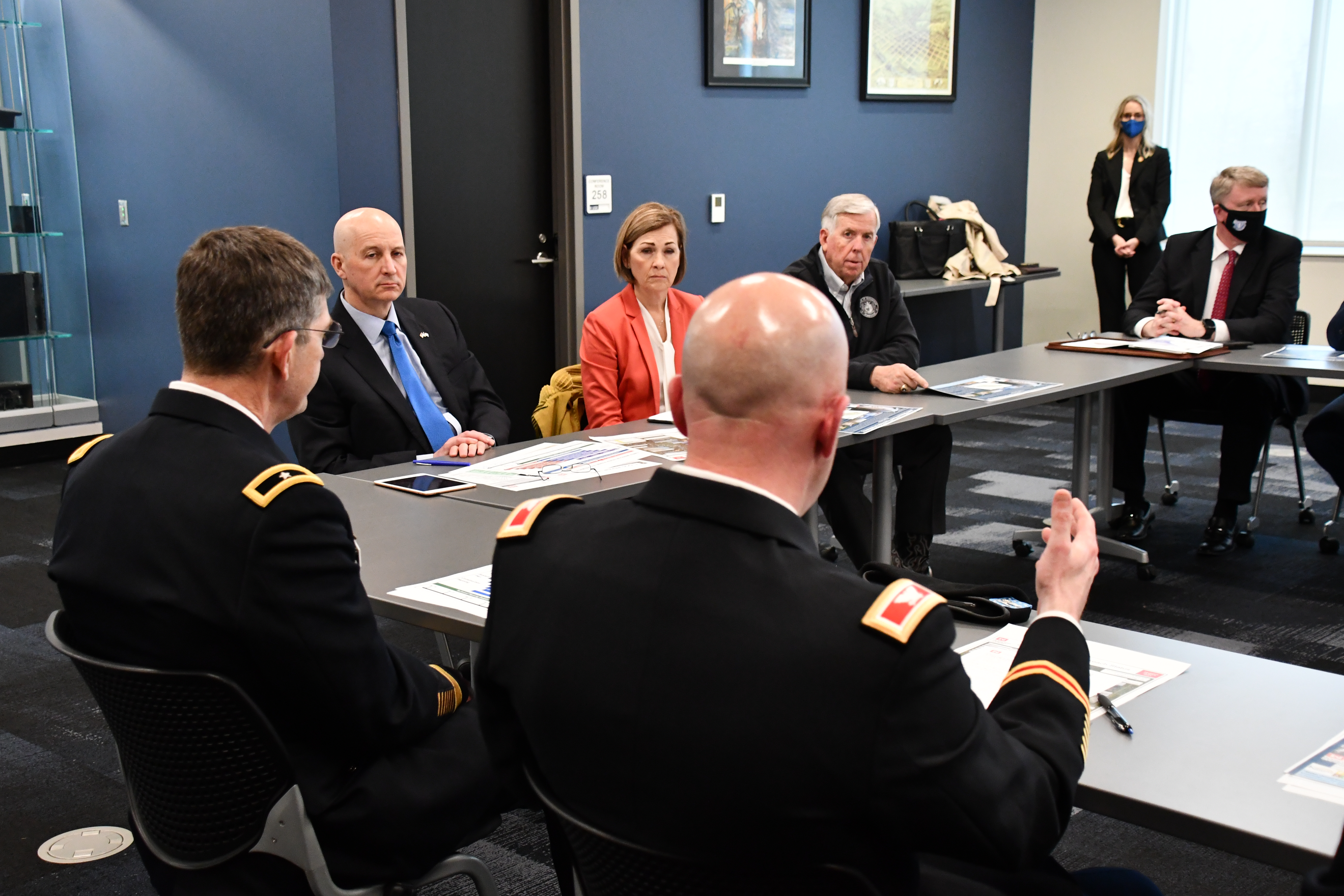
Ricketts during a meeting in 2021

In June 2020, Ricketts threatened to withhold $100 million in federal COVID-19 relief if local governments in Nebraska required people who entered courthouses and other local government offices to wear face masks. Health experts and authorities had recommended face masks as an effective way to halt the virus's spread.

In October 2021, Ricketts ordered Nebraska state agencies not to comply with the federal government's vaccine requirements for employees.

== U.S. Senate (2023–present) ==
=== 2006 election ===
Final results by county in 2006: Ben Nelson: 70–80%; 60–70%; 50–60%; Pete Ricketts: 50–60%

Ricketts was the 2006 Republican nominee for the U.S. Senate seat held by Democrat Ben Nelson. His opponents in the primary were former Nebraska Attorney General Don Stenberg and former state Republican chairman David Kramer. Ricketts spent nearly $5 million of his own money, outspending his opponents 10–1 in winning the nomination.

Ricketts received some high-profile campaign assistance, most notably from President George W. Bush and Vice President Dick Cheney. Bush appeared at a campaign rally for Ricketts on November 5, 2006, just days before the election, in Grand Island.

Ricketts ran on a conservative platform, emphasizing fiscal responsibility, immigration reform, and agriculture, as well as championing a socially conservative platform opposing same-sex marriage and abortion. In all, he contributed $11,302,078 of his own money to his campaign, triggering the Millionaire's Amendment, which allowed his opponent to raise larger amounts from each donor. He spent more money than any Senate candidate in Nebraska history, but lost to Nelson by a margin of 36%–64%.

=== Appointment ===
On January 8, 2023, U.S. Senator Ben Sasse resigned to become president of the University of Florida. On January 12, Jim Pillen, who had succeeded Ricketts as governor one week earlier, appointed Ricketts to the Senate. Ricketts's appointment was controversial, as he had financially supported Pillen's 2022 gubernatorial campaign. Pillen denied this had any role in his decision to appoint Ricketts. Ricketts was sworn in on January 23, 2023. Upon his appointment to the Senate, he announced that he would run in the 2024 special election to serve the remaining two years of Sasse's term.

=== 2024 election ===
In the special election to complete the remainder of Sasse's term, Ricketts defeated Democratic nominee Preston Love Jr., 62.6% to 37.4%.

=== 2026 election ===
On September 21, 2025, Ricketts announced his bid for reelection to a full Senate term. 2024 hopeful and independent candidate Dan Osborn ran against Ricketts.

Controversy arose in March 2026, when William J. Forbes, a "conservative Democrat", declared his candidacy for the Democratic nomination for Senate. The Osborn campaign claimed that Ricketts had installed Forbes as a "plant" to siphon away votes and help Ricketts in the general election, which Ricketts has denied.

Ricketts won the Republican primary and defeated Osborn in the general election.

=== Tenure ===
Ricketts was sworn in as Nebraska's junior U.S. senator by Vice President Kamala Harris on January 23, 2023.

The first three pieces of legislation Ricketts co-sponsored in the Senate were bills to prohibit federal funding for abortion, to make it a federal crime for physicians to perform an abortion on a minor from another state without parental consent, and to reinstate the in-person dispensing requirement for abortion drugs.

In March 2023, Ricketts and fellow Nebraska Senator Deb Fischer visited the U.S.-Mexico border. Ricketts criticized President Joe Biden for what he said was Biden's failure to address the border security crisis. Ricketts has called border security crucial to addressing the ongoing opioid epidemic in the United States. He has also co-sponsored legislation to create federal felony murder charges for drug dealers who distribute fentanyl that leads to an overdose death.

On the Senate Foreign Relations Committee, Ricketts repeatedly criticized the Biden administration for "fumbled diplomacy" and called for a tougher stance against adversaries like the Chinese Communist Party, Iran, and Russia. Ricketts is a vocal supporter of the U.S.-Israel alliance.

Ricketts was the first member of his freshman class to deliver his maiden speech on March 29, 2023. In it, he focused on his belief that "Nebraska is what America is supposed to be" and highlighted his view that Washington D.C. can follow Nebraska's example in running its operations.

==== Committees ====
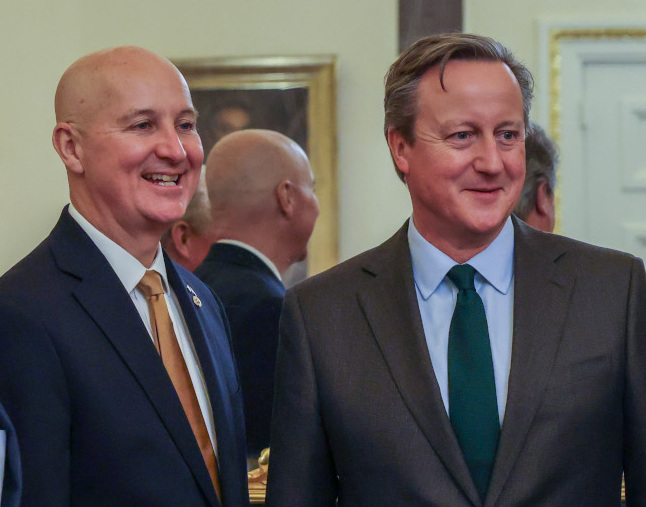
Ricketts with British Foreign Secretary David Cameron in December 2023

- Committee on Environment and Public Works
  - Subcommittee on Clean Air, Climate, and Nuclear Safety (Ranking Member)
  - Subcommittee on Fisheries, Water, and Wildlife
  - Subcommittee on Transportation and Infrastructure
- Committee on Foreign Relations
  - Subcommittee on East Asia, the Pacific, and International Cybersecurity Policy
  - Subcommittee on Europe and Regional Security Cooperation (Ranking Member)
  - Subcommittee on State Department and USAID Management, International Operations, and Bilateral International Development
- Special Committee on Aging

== Political positions ==
=== Abortion ===
Ricketts supports a total ban of abortion, with no exceptions for rape or incest.

=== AI ===
Ricketts supports the construction of AI data centers and called it a matter of "national security".

During his Senate campaign, he has said that he favors the development of artificial general intelligence.

=== Affirmative action ===
Before becoming governor, Ricketts supported an initiative to ban affirmative action in Nebraska, donating $15,000 to a group behind the effort.

=== Critical race theory ===
In 2021, Ricketts said he opposed critical race theory. Asked to explain what critical race theory was, Ricketts said it was "one that really starts creating those divisions between us about defining who we are based on race and that sort of thing and really not about how to bring us together as Americans rather than—and dividing us and also having a lot of very socialist-type ideas about how that would be implemented in our state." Ricketts also called it "Marxist" and "really un-American."

=== Death penalty ===
Ricketts supports the death penalty. In 2015, while governor, he vetoed a bill to abolish capital punishment in Nebraska, but the legislature overrode his veto. In 2016, Ricketts spent part of his family fortune to finance a referendum to reinstate capital punishment in the state. The referendum passed, and in 2018 the state executed Carey Dean Moore, the first inmate put to death in the state in 21 years. Ricketts, a Catholic, rebuffed calls from the Catholic Church to halt executions.

=== Donald Trump ===
Ricketts criticized the impeachment of Donald Trump over his request that Ukraine start an investigation into his political rival Joe Biden. Ricketts said the impeachment proceedings were a "partisan impeachment parade" and praised the Senate for acquitting Trump.

=== Cannabis ===
Ricketts opposes legalization of medical cannabis. In 2019, he said that its "medicinal value has not been tested" and cited studies suggesting that cannabis adversely affects brain functions. He also pointed to overdoses of the synthetic cannabinoid K2 as a "reminder of how dangerous cannabis can be". In 2021, while the Nebraska legislature was contemplating legalizing medical cannabis, he said, "If you legalize marijuana, you're gonna kill your kids. That's what the data shows from around the country."

=== Economy ===
As governor, Ricketts signed legislation enacting $12.7 billion in tax cuts. He was among the 31 Senate Republicans who voted against final passage of the Fiscal Responsibility Act of 2023. In 2025, he voted for the One Big Beautiful Bill Act, which was estimated to increase the federal deficit by more than $4 trillion. Ricketts said, "the One Big Beautiful Bill is a once-in-a-generation opportunity to deliver for Nebraska."

=== Environment ===
Ricketts opposed the Obama administration's Clean Power Plan to reduce greenhouse gas emissions. He supported the Keystone XL Pipeline, saying it would "create jobs here in Nebraska, lots of tax revenues here in Nebraska, of course help us become less dependent on foreign oil."

In 2021, Ricketts said he opposed a proposal by President Joe Biden to preserve 30% of the nation's land and water by 2030, calling it a "radical climate agenda."

In the Senate, Ricketts serves on the Senate Committee on Environment and Public Works. He has been a vocal critic of what he calls "detached from reality" mandates from the Biden administration. Ricketts has also opposed Biden's efforts to expand the definition of the Waters of the U.S. rule and has opposed "new proposed vehicle emissions regulations, which were designed to increase sales of electric vehicles."

=== Foreign policy ===
Ricketts has strongly opposed the second Trump administration's plan to sell advanced AI chips to China.

In 2026, Ricketts supported Trump's decision to enter the 2026 Iran war, and voted against a measure intended to limit it through a war powers resolution. About Pope Leo XIV's critical statements regarding the US–Israeli military operation against Iran, Ricketts said: "The president and the pope have two very different jobs. The president's job is to keep the people of the United States safe. The pope's job is the spiritual welfare of the world. … If your mother and father were fighting, would you want to take a side or would you want to try to de-escalate?"

=== Political contributions ===
In July 2022, Ricketts contributed $250,000 to a political action committee created to oppose the U.S. Senate campaign of Eric Greitens in advance of Missouri's August primary election.

=== Second Amendment ===
As governor, Ricketts designated Nebraska as a "sanctuary state" for the Second Amendment. He believes mental illness causes most mass shootings and has been critical of Biden's support for gun control.

== Personal life ==
Ricketts is Catholic and is a member of the Knights of Columbus and a Knight of the Holy Sepulchre. He is married to Susanne Shore, a Democrat, and endorsed her 2026 candidacy for a seat on the University of Nebraska Board of Regents.

=== Net worth ===
One of the wealthiest members of Congress, Ricketts is the eldest son of billionaire Joe Ricketts, founder of TD Ameritrade. He and his family are part owners of Major League Baseball's Chicago Cubs.

== Electoral history ==
=== 2006 election ===
2006 U.S. Senate primary election results, Nebraska
Party	Candidate	Votes	%
Republican	Pete Ricketts	129,643	48.14
Republican	Don Stenberg	96,496	35.83
Republican	David J. Kramer	43,185	16.03
Total votes		269,324	100.00

2006 United States Senate election in Nebraska
Party	Candidate	Votes	%	±%
Democratic	Ben Nelson (incumbent)	378,388	63.88%	+12.88%
Republican	Pete Ricketts	213,928	36.12%	−12.70%
Total votes		590,961	100.00%	N/A
Democratic hold				

=== 2014 election ===
Nebraska gubernatorial Republican primary, 2014
Party	Candidate	Votes	%
Republican	Pete Ricketts	57,936	26.48
Republican	Jon Bruning	55,761	25.49
Republican	Beau McCoy	45,820	20.94
Republican	Mike Foley	42,039	19.22
Republican	Tom Carlson	9,036	4.13
Republican	Bryan Slone	8,179	3.74
Total votes		218,771	100

2014 Nebraska gubernatorial election
Party	Candidate	Votes	%	±%
Republican	Pete Ricketts	308,751	57.15%	−16.75%
Democratic	Chuck Hassebrook	211,905	39.23%	+13.13%
Libertarian	Mark Elworth	19,001	3.52%	N/A
n/a	Write-ins	545	0.10%	N/A
Total votes		540,202	100.0%	N/A
Republican hold				

=== 2018 election ===
Nebraska gubernatorial Republican primary, 2018
Party	Candidate	Votes	%
Republican	Pete Ricketts (incumbent)	138,292	81.42
Republican	Krystal Gabel	31,568	18.58
Total votes		169,860	100.00

2018 Nebraska gubernatorial election
Party	Candidate	Votes	%	±%
Republican	Pete Ricketts (incumbent)	411,812	59.00%	+1.85%
Democratic	Bob Krist	286,169	41.00%	+1.77%
Total votes		697,981	100.00%	N/A
Republican hold				

=== 2024 election ===
2024 United States Senate special election in Nebraska
Party	Candidate	Votes	%	±%
Republican	Pete Ricketts (incumbent)	585,103	62.58%	−0.16%
Democratic	Preston Love Jr.	349,902	37.42%	+12.99%
Total votes		935,005	100.00%	N/A
Republican hold				

Party political offices
Preceded by Don Stenberg	Republican nominee for U.S. Senator from Nebraska (Class 1); 2006	Succeeded by Deb Fischer
Preceded by Dave Heineman	Republican nominee for Governor of Nebraska; 2014, 2018	Succeeded by Jim Pillen
Preceded by Bill Haslam	Chair of the Republican Governors Association; 2018–2019	Succeeded by Greg Abbott
Preceded by Doug Ducey	Chair of the Republican Governors Association; 2021–2022; Served alongside: Doug Ducey	Succeeded by Kim Reynolds
Preceded by Ben Sasse	Republican nominee for U.S. Senator from Nebraska (Class 2); 2024, 2026	Most recent
Political offices
Preceded by Dave Heineman	Governor of Nebraska; 2015–2023	Succeeded by Jim Pillen
U.S. Senate
Preceded by Ben Sasse	U.S. Senator (Class 2) from Nebraska; 2023–present Served alongside: Deb Fischer	Incumbent
U.S. order of precedence (ceremonial)
Preceded by Eric Schmitt	Order of precedence of the United States as United States Senator	Succeeded by Andy Kim
Preceded by Katie Britt	United States senators by seniority 84th	Succeeded by Adam Schiff
