= Todd Ricketts =

American businessman, politician, and sports team owner (born 1969)

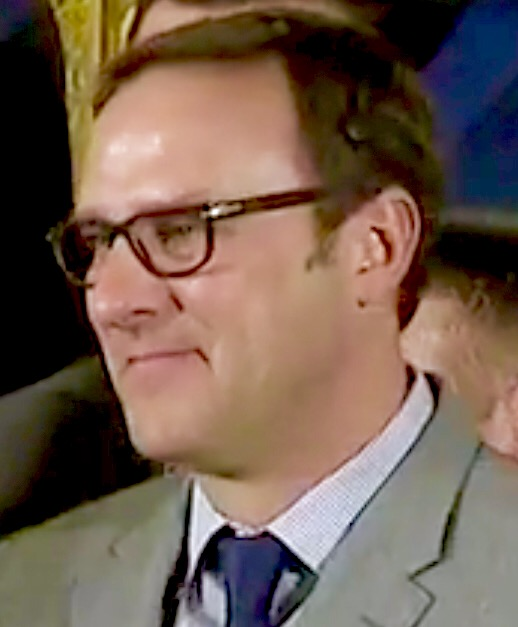

Finance Chair of the Republican National Committee
- In office January 31, 2018 – January 31, 2022
- Preceded by: Steve Wynn
- Succeeded by: Duke Buchan

Personal details
- Born: September 23, 1969 (age 57)
- Party: Republican
- Spouse: Sylvie Légère
- Relatives: Joe Ricketts (father); Pete Ricketts (brother); Laura Ricketts (sister); Thomas S. Ricketts (brother)
- Education: Loyola University Chicago (BA); University of Chicago

Todd Matthew Ricketts (born September 23, 1969) is an American businessman and politician who is a co-owner of the Chicago Cubs, a former member of Charles Schwab & Co. board of directors, and a former Republican National Committee Finance Chair.

== Early life and education ==
Todd Ricketts is the son of Marlene Margaret (née Volkmer) and TD Ameritrade founder and billionaire Joe Ricketts. Ricketts grew up in Omaha, Nebraska. Forbes' estimate of the Ricketts' family wealth ($4.3 billion), consolidated under J. Joseph Ricketts name, placed them at No. 359 on the Forbes 400 list. Ricketts is also brother of Pete Ricketts, a former governor and current senator for Nebraska.

Ricketts earned a bachelor of arts in economics at Loyola University Chicago in 1994 and later attended the University of Chicago's Booth School of Business. Ricketts left Booth before finishing his MBA requirements to work as a trader at a New York-based startup, Knight Securities.

== Career ==
Ricketts worked for securities and investment banking firm Incapital and for the financial services firm Knight Securities. He also worked for TD Ameritrade in business development, and he is on the board of directors of TD Ameritrade Holding Corporation (NASDAQ: AMTD).

Ricketts is also on the board of directors of the Chicago Cubs. In April 2007, Sam Zell announced his intention to acquire the Chicago-based Tribune Company. After acquiring the Tribune, Zell announced that he would sell the Cubs and related entities including Wrigley Field and a 25% share of SportsNet Chicago. The Ricketts family bid was selected as the winning bid on January 22, 2009. The family bid included all four siblings (Peter, Tom, Laura, and Todd) and both parents. Forbes estimated that the ownership stake in the Chicago Cubs represents $642 million out of the total $900 million bid. Ricketts has a World Series title to his credit, as the Cubs won the championship in 2016 defeating the Cleveland Indians four games to three.

Ricketts is an investor in Napolita (pizzeria) in Wilmette, Illinois, and was a co-owner of Higher Gear bike shops in Wilmette, Illinois and Highland Park, Illinois. Higher Gear closed in December 2017. Ricketts was a member of the board of directors of World Bicycle Relief as well as other non-profits.

Since 2013, Ricketts has been a member of the board of directors and CEO of a non-profit small government advocacy group called Ending Spending Inc. Ending Spending was founded by Joe Ricketts in 2010 to advocate against congressional earmarks.

== Political activity ==
Ricketts was an influential fundraiser and donor during the 2016 US presidential election, supporting Wisconsin governor Scott Walker during the Republican Party primaries. He was named co-chair of Walker's fundraising drive in May 2015.

Ricketts manages the conservative political operations for the Republican wing of the Ricketts family. After Walker bowed out of the race in September 2015, the Ricketts family donated $5.5 million to Our Principles PAC, a super PAC opposing the candidacy of Donald Trump. Once Trump became the presumptive nominee of the Republican Party, Ricketts reversed his stance, throwing his support to Trump. In May 2016, Ricketts was chosen as an at-large member of the Illinois delegation to the Republican National Convention. During the tail end of the general election, Ricketts participated in fundraisers in Chicago for Trump's candidacy and helped to raise money for the pro-Trump super PACs 45 Committee and Future 45, raising over $66 million.

In late November 2016, President-elect Donald Trump announced the nomination of Ricketts as Deputy Secretary of Commerce, but in April 2017, Ricketts withdrew himself from consideration, citing the inability to divest his financial holdings to the satisfaction of the Office of Government Ethics.

In January 2018, Ricketts was named the finance chair for the Republican National Committee.

== Property tax investigation ==
In July 2019 it was reported by the Chicago Tribune that for nearly a decade Ricketts has paid property taxes "based on the value of [a] much older and smaller house that he tore down to make way for [a] new one, providing him with a huge discount likely totaling tens of thousands of dollars over the years." The Tribune article continued, "State law required Ricketts to notify the assessor that he had built a new home in 2010, but a spokesman for the assessor’s office said there’s no record that Ricketts ever did." In 2013, according to the Tribune report, Ricketts' attorney filed a property tax appeal seeking a reduction based on the age and size of the house - and included in the paperwork a photo of the 100-year-old home that had been torn down years before.

"Todd Ricketts should repay the property tax relief it now appears he was not entitled to. I am most concerned and frankly outraged by the apparent intentional misrepresentation," Cook County Board of Review commissioner Michael Cabonargi said in a statement. "By submitting a signed affidavit with outdated photos, it appears he sought to defraud the Board of Review. By not paying his fair share, Mr. Ricketts shifted his property taxes to other home owners."

In September 2019, the Tribune reported that the Cook County Board of Review had referred to the state's attorney its investigation of Ricketts’ property tax appeal on his designer Wilmette home, after concluding that Ricketts and his real estate lawyer made "misrepresentations" that lowered their tax bills by tens of thousands of dollars. The tax board did not specify whether it was seeking a criminal or civil review.

== Philanthropy ==
Ricketts is vice chairman of The National WWII Museum in New Orleans, and is on the board of Opportunity Education Foundation. He is a Regent at Loyola University Chicago. He is also active with The Churchill Centre.

== Undercover Boss ==
On November 7, 2010, Ricketts appeared on the reality television series Undercover Boss, going incognito as an entry-level employee at Wrigley Field. His brother Tom was also considered for the part, but the Cubs chose Todd as Tom was considered too recognizable (though Todd was still recognized by an old roommate of his while parking cars and had to clue him in on the secret). Ricketts grew out his beard and wore fake glasses, assuming his alias — unemployed roofer "Mark Dawson". From August 30 to September 8, during a nine-game Cubs' homestand, Ricketts worked a number of jobs at the ballpark, selling hot dogs, operating the scoreboard, picking up trash, cleaning toilets, and raising the Cubs Win flag after the Cubs' 7-6 win over the Mets on September 4. He was fired from his maintenance job during the episode.

== Personal life ==
Ricketts is married to French-Canadian Sylvie Légère.

== Awards and honors ==
- 2016 World Series Champion (as co-owner of the Cubs).
