= Tom Sosnoff =

American businessperson and financial options trader (b. 1957)

- Born: March 6, 1957 (age 69); New York City, New York

Academic background
- Education: University at Albany, SUNY

Academic work
- Discipline: Finance; Options trading Entrepreneurship
- Awards: EY Entrepreneur of the Year (2014)
- Website: www.tastylive.com

Tom Sosnoff (born March 6, 1957) is an American entrepreneur, options trader and media personality who has helped popularise options and futures trading among retail investors.

Sosnoff is a former floor trader on the Chicago Board Options Exchange (CBOE). He co‑founded the online brokerage thinkorswim in 1999 and sold it to TD Ameritrade for about US$606 million in 2009; reports suggest he personally received roughly US$84 million from the sale. Sosnoff later co‑founded the trading network and brokerage tastytrade—later branded tastylive and tastytrade. In 2021 his company was acquired by IG Group for roughly US$1 billion. He has subsequently launched several ventures, including the dough trading platform, the Small Exchange futures market, the print magazine Luckbox and, in 2025, an AI‑driven salary‑valuation platform called Lossdog.

== Early life and education ==
Sosnoff was born in New York City and grew up in Hartsdale, New York. His mother taught art and his father practised labour law. He worked as a caddie at a local golf course as a teenager. Sosnoff earned a Bachelor of Arts degree in political science from the University at Albany, SUNY in 1979. A recession limited job prospects when he graduated, so he accepted a position at investment bank Drexel Burnham Lambert. After six months he left New York to join a group of traders going to the CBOE; their venture failed, and he became a clerk on the trading floor. Sosnoff later raised about US$100 000 from an investor to trade options on his own and within two years bought out his backer. In 1988 he teamed up with fellow trader Scott Sheridan.

== Career ==
=== Market making and thinkorswim ===
During the 1980s Sosnoff and Sheridan traded as market makers on the CBOE through the Sosnoff Sheridan Group. They used their own capital to launch the online brokerage thinkorswim in 1999. In January 2009 TD Ameritrade agreed to acquire thinkorswim for about US$606 million in cash and stock; the sale closed later that year. After the merger Sosnoff joined TD Ameritrade as senior vice‑president for trading and strategic initiatives.

=== tastytrade, tastylive and dough ===
In August 2011 Sosnoff and long‑time colleagues Kristi Ross and Scott Sheridan launched tastytrade, a daily financial‑news network that teaches options trading through live on‑air trades and comedy sketches. Broadcasting from a Chicago brownstone, the network rapidly expanded to eight hours of live content per day. A 2011 Wall Street Journal report said tastytrade had raised US$20 million in venture capital. In 2014 Silicon Valley venture firm Technology Crossover Ventures invested US$25 million in the network’s parent company, dough, Inc., to expand on‑air talent and technology. According to a 2011 report summarised by Market Realist, Sosnoff used much of his US$84 million proceeds from the sale of thinkorswim to fund tastytrade’s launch. In January 2014 the group released dough, a mobile educational trading platform. Dough and tastytrade were later combined under dough, Inc., which used the TCV investment to fuel international expansion.

=== tastyworks brokerage and IG Group acquisition ===
In 2017 the team launched tastyworks, another brokerage designed. In January 2021 IG Group announced it would acquire tastytrade for US$1 billion—US$300 million in cash and 61 million IG shares—to expand its North American presence. The acquisition closed later that year. Sosnoff continued to host programmes on the network (by then branded tastylive) until announcing in September 2025 that he was leaving; he said he remained a shareholder and consultant but would focus on new projects.

=== Other ventures ===
In addition to thinkorswim and tastytrade/tastylive, Sosnoff has launched or backed several other financial‑technology projects: Small Exchange: In 2020 he co‑founded the Small Exchange, a U.S. futures exchange. Luckbox Magazine: In April 2019 he oversaw the launch of Luckbox, a print magazine targeting entrepreneurs, and investors. The publication won the 2020 Nichee Awards for Best Magazine Launch and Best B2B Magazine, and within a year it reported more than 20 000 readers. dough, Inc. (earlier venture): In addition to the dough trading app, the company served as the parent for tastytrade and used the 2014 TCV investment to hire additional talent and build technology.

=== Lossdog ===
After leaving tastylive in September 2025, Sosnoff announced Lossdog, an AI-driven platform designed to aid in negotiating compensation. Sosnoff serves as its founder and chief executive.

=== Options trading and media appearances ===
Throughout his career Sosnoff has promoted options trading as a core strategy for individual investors. He has hosted programmes on his web sites using skits to explain investment and business strategies, and he has spoken at conferences and universities on topics such as entrepreneurship, trading psychology and financial technology. He has also warned investors to avoid chasing hyped stocks and instead look for oversold opportunities.

== Recognition and influence ==
Sosnoff received the Ernst & Young Entrepreneur of the Year Award for the Midwest region in 2014. He has been included on technology and entrepreneurship lists such as Techweek’s Tech 100 and Crain’s Chicago Business Tech 50. Media profiles have dubbed him the “godfather of options trading” for his role in democratising complex financial instruments by combining user‑friendly platforms with continuous education. As chair of the Small Exchange he continues to advocate for smaller contract sizes and lower costs to attract self‑directed futures traders.

== Personal life ==
Sosnoff resides in the Chicago area. Public filings indicate that he and his family established the Sosnoff Charitable Foundation in 2021, a private foundation registered in Illinois. He frequently appears at trading‑education tours and events such as Chicago Ideas Week, Techweek and various university programmes. Tax filings for the Sosnoff Charitable Foundation list two of his children—Case Sosnoff and Cole Sosnoff—as directors.
