= Thomas S. Ricketts =

Chairman of the Chicago Cubs (born 1963)

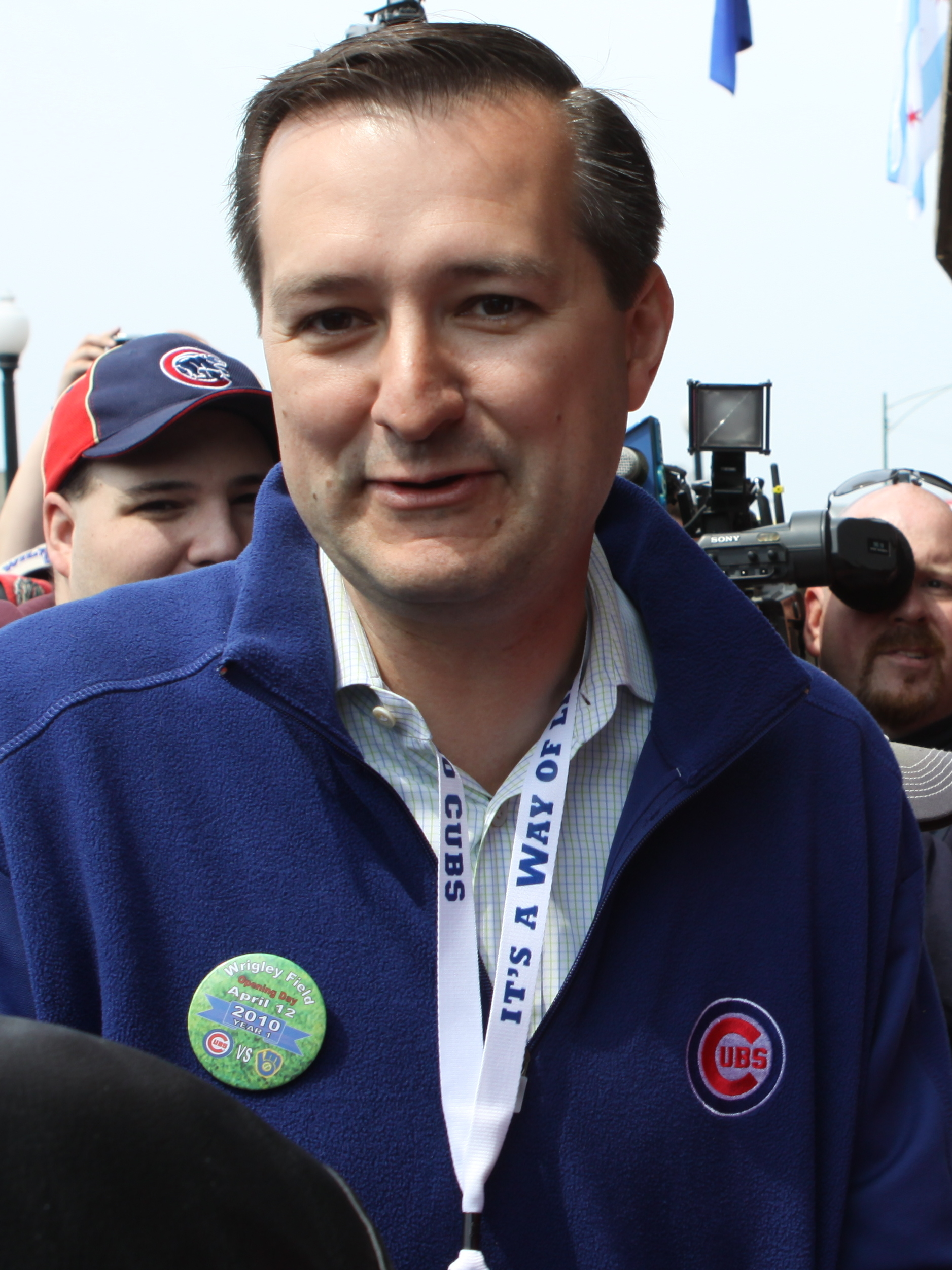
- Ricketts in 2010
- Born: Thomas Stuart Ricketts; May 23, 1966 (age 60); Omaha, Nebraska, U.S.
- Education: University of Chicago (BA, MBA)
- Occupations: Chairman of the Chicago Cubs; Chairman, Incapital LLC.
- Spouse: Cecelia Ricketts
- Children: 5
- Parent: Joe Ricketts; Marlene Volkmer
- Relatives: Pete Ricketts (brother); Todd Ricketts (brother); Laura Ricketts (sister)
- Awards: 2016 World Series champion

Thomas Stuart Ricketts (born May 23, 1966) is an American businessman and executive who is the chair of the Chicago Cubs in Major League Baseball (MLB), and chair, co-founder, and former CEO of Incapital LLC, a firm that provides securities firms and individual investors more efficient access to corporate bonds. Together with his sister Laura and brother Todd, the Ricketts siblings are the board of directors for the Cubs. He is the son of TD Ameritrade Holding Corporation founder J. Joseph Ricketts. Joe Ricketts had a net worth of US$2.3 billion as of 2018 according to Forbes.

In January 2009, a Ricketts family bid led by Tom emerged as the winning bidder for the Chicago Cubs. The bid was estimated to total around $900 million for the team and related assets. In October 2009, the sale was approved unanimously by the owners of the other 29 Major League Baseball teams. Ricketts was introduced as the chairman of the Cubs on October 31, 2009. Tom Ricketts and his three siblings Peter, Laura, and Todd share ownership of the team through their family trust.

== Early life ==
Born in Omaha, Nebraska, Thomas Stuart Ricketts is the son of Marlene Margaret (Volkmer) and Joe Ricketts, who founded Ameritrade when Tom was eight years old. Joe Ricketts let it be known that he wanted his children to establish themselves through their own hard work and would not be allowed to join TD Ameritrade until they reached the age of 30.

Ricketts is one of four children. His brother Pete Ricketts, who lives in Omaha, was the Governor of Nebraska from 2015 to 2023 and is currently the junior U.S. Senator for Nebraska. His younger sister, Laura Ricketts, is a former corporate lawyer. His brother, Todd Ricketts was a board member of T.D. Ameritrade from 2011 to 2020, is on the board of Charles Schwab, and is a former finance chair of the Republican National Committee and entrepreneur.

== Education ==
=== University of Chicago ===
In 1983, Ricketts moved to Chicago in order to attend the University of Chicago with his younger brother Peter, also a student at the University of Chicago. Ricketts received a bachelor's degree from the university in 1988 and returned to receive his Master of Business Administration in 1993. Ricketts has given generous donations to the University of Chicago and established the 'New Year Scholarship Fund,' which awards an incoming student a full undergraduate scholarship.

== Chicago Cubs ==
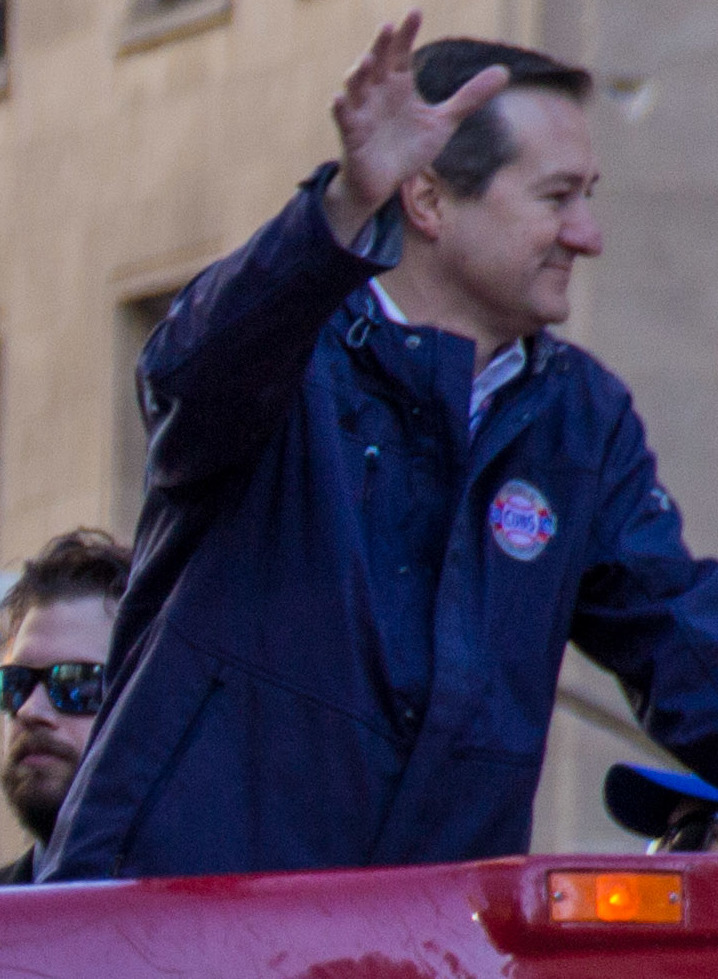
Ricketts during the victory parade following the Cubs 2016 World Series victory

In April 2007, Sam Zell announced his intention to acquire the Chicago-based Tribune Company. After acquiring the Tribune, Zell announced that he would sell the Cubs and related entities including Wrigley Field and a 25% share of SportsNet Chicago. Under bankruptcy protection, the sale of the Cubs and the 25% interest in SportsNet Chicago would raise needed funds for the ailing Tribune company. In a campaign led by Ricketts, the family was selected for the winning bid on January 22, 2009. Forbes estimated that the ownership stake in the Chicago Cubs represents $642 million out of the total $900 million bid made by Ricketts.

Tom Ricketts has said that his love for the Chicago Cubs started during the 1984 season when he was 18 years old and moved to Chicago to attend college. Later, Tom and his brother Pete lived in an apartment over the "Sports Corner" at Addison and Sheffield, across the street from Wrigley Field. He met his wife Cecelia in the Wrigley bleachers and simply states that "my family and I are Cubs fans". The bid was reviewed by Major League Baseball and other stake holders. Although several close friends told the press about Ricketts's deep love for the Cubs, the Ricketts family decided not to court media attention until the bid was accepted by all parties.

On July 6, 2009, the Chicago Tribune reported that Tom Ricketts and family had reached an agreement with the Tribune Company to purchase the Cubs, Wrigley Field, and 25% of Comcast SportsNet Chicago for close to $900 million, as was originally reported. The contract was sent to commissioner Bud Selig for approval. Final approval came by a unanimous vote of the other MLB owners in an October 6, 2009 conference call. On October 27, 2009, the Ricketts family, with Tom Ricketts as board chairman, officially took over 95% ownership of the Chicago Cubs, Wrigley Field, and 25% ownership of Comcast SportsNet Chicago. The Tribune opted to retain a 5% ownership stake in the team and the Chicago Cubs acquired the remaining stake in 2019.

Since acquiring the majority control of the Cubs, Ricketts has been criticized for refusing to invest the team’s revenue on acquiring and retaining players, opting to invest in renovating the area around Wrigley Field and Wrigley Field itself.

== Real estate development around Wrigley Field ==
Since acquiring the Chicago Cubs in October 2009, the Ricketts family placed a priority on renovating Wrigley Field. In 2014, the nearly $1 billion renovation project of Wrigley Field and the collateral land finally broke ground after winning city approval.

Besides preserving Wrigley Field, the objective was to also leverage the Wrigley investment to create a public space adjacent to the stadium that would function as a town square, offering year-round attractions for neighbors, families, fans and visitors.

On Opening Day of the 2017 season, with Cubs fans celebrating its first in a century role as the defending world champions of baseball, the Ricketts family delivered The Park at Wrigley. Chairman Tom Ricketts, president of business operations Crane Kenney, Chicago Mayor Rahm Emanuel, numerous elected officials, neighbors and community leaders cut the ribbon at the Park at Wrigley.

On March 30, the Ricketts family opened their first hotel, located on Clark Street, across from the front entrance of Wrigley Field.

"By the end of the 2018 off-season and next, our initial plan [will be] complete," said Ricketts, whose family bought the team from Tribune Company in 2009. "That doesn't mean we're done, because it's a 100-year- old ballpark. There will be something else we have to fix after that. But it will be great to have the major construction done a year from now. We'll get the upper-deck renovation done after the 2018 season, and that will really help the ballpark a lot."

== Business history ==
Ricketts is the chairman, co-founder and former CEO of Incapital LLC. Ricketts spent one summer early in life working at TD Ameritrade, giving customers stock quotes over the phone.

=== Mesirow Financial and ABN AMRO ===
When Ricketts finished undergraduate studies (1988), he joined the Chicago Board Options Exchange as a market maker. Ricketts held this position until 1994, shortly after finishing his MBA. From 1995 to 1996, he was a vice president with Mesirow Financial until moving to ABN AMRO as a vice president in their brokerage division. Ricketts is credited with pioneering the idea of using the Internet and other technologies to help companies sell their investment-grade bonds directly to retail investors, as opposed to limiting sales only to institutions. He helped launch the first version of this system while at ABN AMRO. In 1999 he left ABN AMRO to found Incapital.

=== Incapital LLC ===
Thomas Ricketts co-founded Chicago-based Incapital LLC in 1999. The securities and investment banking firm has since expanded with two additional offices in Boca Raton, Florida and London, England. Ricketts was Incapital's chairman. Forbes describes the company as a "technologically-oriented investment bank focused exclusively on the underwriting and distribution of fixed income products to individual investors. Incapital underwrites for several major U.S. corporations through its InterNotesSM product platform."

=== InspereX ===
In February 2021, Incapital announced it was merging with 280 CapMarkets to create a new fintech, InspereX, with a mission of "improving fixed income distribution and trading for all market participants." The merger was completed in July 2021. Post-merger, Ricketts is chairman of the board of InspereX.
