= TD Waterhouse =

Canadian financial services corporation headquartered in Toronto

TD Waterhouse Canada Inc.
- Formerly: Greenline Investor Services, Waterhouse Securities
- Company type: Subsidiary
- Industry: Financial services
- Headquarters: Toronto, Ontario, Canada
- Brands: TD Direct Investing; TD Wealth
- Parent: Toronto-Dominion Bank
- Divisions: TD Direct Investing; TD Wealth Financial Planning; TD Wealth Private Investment Advice
- Website: www.td.com/ca/en/investing

TD Waterhouse Canada Inc. is a Canadian financial services corporation headquartered in Toronto, Ontario. It is a wholly owned subsidiary of Toronto-Dominion Bank. The company does business through several divisions, namely TD Direct Investing, TD Wealth Financial Planning, and TD Wealth Private Investment Advice. The TD Waterhouse brand was also formerly used for TD's American and British brokerages.

== History ==
TD's original brokerage, Greenline Investor Services, was established in 1984. Greenline Investor Services merged with Gardiner Group Stockholders in 1987, becoming the first Canadian bank to purchase seats on the Toronto, Montreal, Vancouver and Alberta stock exchanges. In 1993, Greenline Investor Services acquired the operations of Marathon Brokerage, a Canadian discount brokerage. The TD Waterhouse brand originated as an American brand for discount brokerage when TD purchased Waterhouse Securities in 1996. The name TD Waterhouse was formed and was used for TD's British, Canadian, and American brokerage activities. In Canada, TD Waterhouse thus replaced the brand Greenline.

In 1996, TD became the first online broker in Canada with the launch of WebBroker. In June 1999, TD spun off 42 million shares or 12.4% of TD Waterhouse in an IPO, with shares priced at $35.28 CAD or US$24 per share, earning US$1.01 billion. In 2001, with the bursting of the dot-com bubble and lower trade volumes that brought down Waterhouse's share price, TD bought back that minority stake at US$9 per share for only US$378 million, earning a tidy profit on the privatization. The acquisition was conditional on TD owning at least 90 percent of Waterhouse's outstanding common shares, and it owned almost 89 percent when the privatization was announced.

In 2003, Toronto–Dominion Bank held talks to merge Waterhouse with E*TRADE, which would have created the second-largest discount broker in the United States after Charles Schwab, but the two sides could not come to an agreement over control of the merged entity. Later in 2005, E*TRADE made an unsolicited offer for Ameritrade. However, Ameritrade instead purchased TD Waterhouse USA, with TD Bank holding a 39% stake in the new entity. As part of the deal, Ameritrade sold its Canadian operations to TD Bank who merged them with TD Waterhouse Canada. When TD merged its American brokerage activities with Ameritrade, the newly formed American broker formed the brand TD Ameritrade, but the Canadian division retained the TD Waterhouse brand.

In December 2012, TD replaced the TD Waterhouse Discount Brokerage brand with TD Direct Investing. TD Direct Investing Europe, a discount broking subsidiary in the United Kingdom, with headquarters in Leeds, which also used the TD Waterhouse brand, was sold in 2016 to Interactive Investor in a deal financed by JC Flowers.

In 2022, Charles Schwab purchased TD Ameritrade, and along with it, thinkorswim. At the time, thinkorswim was one of the electronic trading platforms TD Direct Investing customers use to perform trades. In light of this, TD Active Trader was announced in 2023 to serve clients that previously used thinkorswim. TD Waterhouse also began migrating TD Direct Investing clients off of thinkorswim the same year.

== Services ==
=== TD Direct Investing ===
TD Direct Investing is the online brokerage brand of TD Waterhouse. The brand offers services to trade stocks, options, mutual funds, fixed income investments, such as bonds, GICs, T-Bills, exchange-traded funds, as well as IPOs. TD Direct Investing offers several electronic trading platforms for users: WebBroker, the TD app, the TD Advanced Dashboard, and TD Active Trader. TD Direct Investing offers several types of accounts such as margin account, cash accounts, tax-free savings accounts, registered retirement savings plans, registered education savings plans, and life income funds. The brokerage also offers online educational resources for learning how to trade assets and how to invest.

=== TD Wealth ===
The TD Wealth brand refers to services provided by TD Waterhouse and its parent company TD Bank that provide advice and management of wealth and investments. TD Wealth Financial Planning is the division of TD Waterhouse the provides financial planning. TD Wealth Private Investment Advice is the division that provides private wealth management services. It works with clients to produce an investment strategy and provides them with portfolio management services. The services, along with other TD services from different subsidiaries and divisions of TD Bank, provide TD Wealth Private Wealth Management, a suite of products and services for private wealth management.
