= LPAC =

American Super PAC representing lesbians

LPAC, formally known as the Lesbian Super PAC, is a Super PAC founded in 2012 to represent the interests of lesbians in the United States, and to campaign on LGBT and women's rights issues. According to its chair it was the first Super PAC of its kind. Its supporters include Billie Jean King, Jane Lynch, Laura Ricketts and Urvashi Vaid. On its first day of operations, LPAC raised $200,000. In April 2015 LPAC endorsed Hillary Clinton's 2016 presidential campaign. In 2021, Mary Trump joined LPAC's board.

== See also ==
- Lesbian American history
- War on women
