= Gothamist =

NYPR-operated New York City–centric blog

- Website type: News, culture
- Available in: English
- Owner: New York Public Radio
- Creators: Jake Dobkin; Jen Chung
- Website: gothamist.com
- Launched: 2003; 23 years ago
- Current status: Active

Gothamist is a New York City–centric blog operated by New York Public Radio. From 2003 to 2018, Gothamist LLC was the operator, or in some cases franchisor, of eight city-centric websites that focused on news, events, food, culture, and other local coverage. It was founded in 2003 by Jake Dobkin and Jen Chung. In March 2017, Joe Ricketts, owner of DNAinfo, acquired the company and, in November 2017, the websites were temporarily shut down after the newsroom staff voted to unionize. In February 2018, it was announced that New York Public Radio, KPCC and WAMU had acquired Gothamist, LAist, and DCist, respectively. Chicagoist was purchased by Chicago-born rapper Chance the Rapper in July 2018.

== History ==
=== Early history and other blogs ===
The blog Gothamist, focused on New York City, was founded in 2003, by publisher Jake Dobkin and editor Jen Chung. In February 2005, Gothamist LLC launched Bostonist and Seattlest, adding Phillyist in June 2005. In January 2011, the co-editors of the Phillyist site announced that other commitments had moved them to reach an agreement with the Gothamist LLC publishers to let them shutdown the Philadelphia operation at month-end; in October 2011, the company decided to shutter the Bostonist website, noting that it was creating just 1% of its network-wide traffic.

As of June 2014, other news blogs operated by the company included LAist for Los Angeles, DCist for Washington, D.C., Chicagoist for Chicago, and SFist for San Francisco in the United States, as well as Londonist and Shanghaiist internationally.

Canadian blog Torontoist was launched by the American company, but was transferred to the locally owned Ink Truck Media in April 2009, while retaining its "-ist" name and remaining affiliated with the Gothamist network. In March 2011, Torontoist was acquired from Ink Truck Media by St. Joseph Media, magazine publishing division of Canadian media giant St. Joseph Communications. As a result, the site was not affected by the Gothamist shutdown in 2017, and remained in operation until it was acquired by Daily Hive in 2019.

In a similar fashion, in 2010 Londonist was transferred to the London-based startup LDN Creative.

An estimate by Income.com in 2015 quoted the monthly revenue from Gothamist at $110,000.

=== Shutdown ===
In 2017, Gothamist and all related blogs were sold to Joe Ricketts, owner of DNAinfo. After the acquisition, Gothamist expunged from its archives a number of stories that had covered Ricketts critically. Regarding the removal of Ricketts related content from the site, Dobkin told Jezebel, "Just as Bloomberg doesn't cover Bloomberg, we don't plan to cover Joe Ricketts and so we decided to take down our coverage of him. No one asked us to do it. It was a decision made solely by Jen [Chung] and me."

On November 2, 2017, Ricketts posted to both DNAinfo and the "-ist" network sites that both websites would immediately cease operations, a week after Gothamist writers voted to unionize with the Writers Guild of America, East. All content from all DNAinfo sites and all subsidiary sites were taken down. The next day, archives of the sites were returned to functionality. Ricketts's shutdown was criticized as being a mere act of retaliation after the two companies' workers had joined a union. In the aftermath of the shutdown, laid-off Gothamist reporters stated that former owners Dobkin and Chung actively cooperated with Ricketts to discourage the union efforts, calling their actions "textbook union-busting stuff."

=== Relaunch ===
On February 23, 2018, public radio stations WNYC, KPCC, and WAMU announced that they had jointly acquired Gothamist and its related sites LAist and DCist. Under the agreement, Gothamist and its sister sites would begin publishing news content again. Additionally, WNYC acquired the archives of Chicagoist and SFist, and Chicago's WBEZ stated that they were exploring an acquisition of the former. WAMU relaunched DCist on June 11, 2018. Gothamist confirmed that Chance the Rapper acquired Chicagoist after he announced it in a new song, "I Might Need Security", on July 18, 2018.

On January 7, 2019, labor union SAG-AFTRA and WNYC announced that they had reached an agreement to recognize more than 25 digital employees of New York Public Radio, including Gothamist staff.

Impress3 Media bought the San Francisco blog site SFist in January 2019 and relaunched it the following month with the former editor-in-chief as a consultant.

In April 2021, WNYC laid off 14 employees, amounting to 4% of total staff. This included several workers at the Gothamist including its editor-in-chief.

WAMU shut down DCist in 2024.

== Awards ==
The flagship Gothamist blog has received a number of awards and commendations, including six Bloggies nominations. It was named a "Forbes Favorite", and a BusinessWeek "Best of the Web". In 2007, Gothamist was named blog of the year by Wired magazine and given a Wired Rave Award.
