= Block Club Chicago =

American online newspaper

- Website type: News
- Available in: English
- Owner: Block Club Chicago NFP
- Website: blockclubchicago.org
- Launched: June 2018

Block Club Chicago is an online newspaper that reports on local and neighborhood news in Chicago. The website operates as a non-profit, subscription-based service.

== History ==
After DNAinfo was shut down in November 2017, Block Club Chicago was founded by three former editors of DNAinfo Chicago – Shamus Toomey, Stephanie Lulay, and Jen Sabella. The new online publication was initially funded through a Kickstarter campaign and capital from the Civil publishing platform. At the time, the Kickstarter campaign was the most successful local news initiative of its kind. Block Club Chicago officially launched on June 12, 2018.

Block Club Chicago was founded to supply a neighborhood-focused coverage and adopted a geographic, rather than topical, structure, assigning each reporter a specific "neighborhood beat."

As of 2021, Block Club Chicago had a newsletter circulation of 140,000 and 15,500 paid subscribers. It had ten reporters and five editors.

By 2023, the website had grown to 20,000 paid subscribers and offered news coverage of 45 of Chicago's 77 community areas.
