= Laura Ricketts =

American political activist

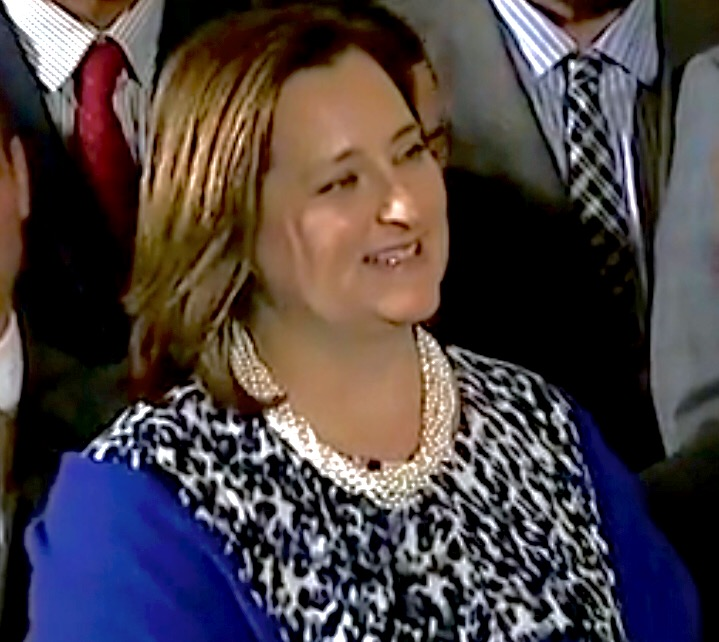
- Ricketts at the White House after the Cubs 2016 World Series victory
- Born: Laura Marie Ricketts; September 15, 1967 (age 59); Omaha, Nebraska, U.S.
- Education: University of Chicago (BA); University of Michigan (JD)
- Occupations: Board member, Chicago Cubs; Owner, Chicago Stars FC
- Political party: Democratic
- Spouse: Brooke Skinner (m. 2015)
- Parent(s): Joe Ricketts; Marlene Volkmer
- Relatives: Pete Ricketts (brother); Todd Ricketts (brother); Thomas S. Ricketts (brother)

Laura Marie Ricketts (born December 15, 1967) is an American political activist and former attorney who is co-owner of the Chicago Cubs and the Chicago Stars Football Club. Ricketts is also a board member of Lambda Legal and the Housing Opportunities for Women organization. Ricketts's ownership stake in the Cubs makes her the first openly gay owner of a major-league sports franchise.

== Personal life ==
Ricketts and her three siblings grew up in Omaha, Nebraska. She is the daughter of Joe Ricketts and Marlene Margaret Ricketts (née Volkmer).

Ricketts' father founded what became TD Ameritrade when Laura was age 7. He let it be known that he wanted his children to establish themselves through their own hard work and would not be allowed to join the company until they reached the age of thirty.

Ricketts is a former corporate lawyer. Ricketts received her bachelor's degree from the University of Chicago in 1989 and her Juris Doctor from the University of Michigan Law School in 1998. Laura talks of her own struggle to come out; "I came out to my family I would say early to mid 90s. I think for a long time I wasn't really out to myself, growing up in Omaha, Neb., to a Catholic conservative family. It took me a while to come out to myself and not long after that I came out to them. I think that it really couldn't have been a better experience. They were all immediately supportive. ... I have been really really fortunate in that regard."

In 1999, Ricketts was admitted to the Illinois State Bar Association; her license to practice law expired in 2015.

On June 6, 2015, Ricketts married Brooke Skinner. Skinner is the Chief Experience Officer at Cars.com. Their wedding was officiated by Jim Bennett, the Midwest Director of Lambda Legal.

Ricketts is one of four children. Her older brother Pete Ricketts is a former Governor of Nebraska and the current junior U.S. Senator from Nebraska. Her brother Tom is chairman of the Chicago Cubs, and the chief executive officer of Incapital LLC. Tom, Laura, and their youngest brother, Todd, live within blocks of each other in Wilmette, Illinois.

In 2013, Ricketts was inducted into the Chicago Gay and Lesbian Hall of Fame.

=== Political involvement ===
Ricketts is a Democrat, unlike her parents and her siblings (who are all notable Republicans). Ricketts is liberal and an LGBTQ activist. Ricketts founded and served as the chairwoman of LPAC, an LGBTQ Super PAC.

Ricketts was a top bundler for Barack Obama's re-election campaign during the 2012 presidential election.

Ricketts was also a supporter of Hillary Clinton's 2016 presidential campaign in the Democratic primaries and the general election. In announcing LPAC's April 2015 endorsement of Clinton, Ricketts said, "We are proud to endorse Hillary Clinton as she begins her run for the White House. Hillary is an unyielding advocate for LGBTQ women. Our endorsement today represents LPAC’s strong support of her candidacy."

Ricketts was a top bundler for the Clinton campaign. Clinton herself personally attended a campaign fundraiser that Laura and her wife Brooke hosted at their Wilmette home in July 2016.

In addition to supporting Clinton as a donor and fundraiser, Ricketts supported several Democrats running for other offices in the 2016 elections. Ricketts gave personal donations that year to Jan Schakowsky's congressional re-election campaign, Tammy Duckworth's senate campaign, Maggie Hassan's senate campaign, and Russ Feingold's senate campaign. Ricketts also donated to the Hillary Victory Fund, a joint fundraising committee benefiting both state parties and the Clinton campaign.

Ricketts served as an Illinois superdelegate to the 2016 Democratic National Convention.

Rickets served as a co-chair of the campaign finance committee of Jesse Ruiz's campaign for the Democratic nomination in the 2018 Illinois attorney general election.

During Chicago's 2019 mayoral election, Ricketts endorsed and became a co-chair of Susana Mendoza's campaign in the first round. After Mendoza was eliminated, Ricketts backed Lori Lightfoot in the election's runoff. She supported Lightfoot in the 2023 Chicago mayoral election, with Ricketts and her wife both having been named in April 2022 to serve as a finance co-chair of Lightfoot's reelection campaign.

Ricketts supported Joe Biden during the 2020 United States presidential election. After his victory, she donated $250,000 to the inaugural committee planning the Biden's inauguration.

== Chicago Cubs ==
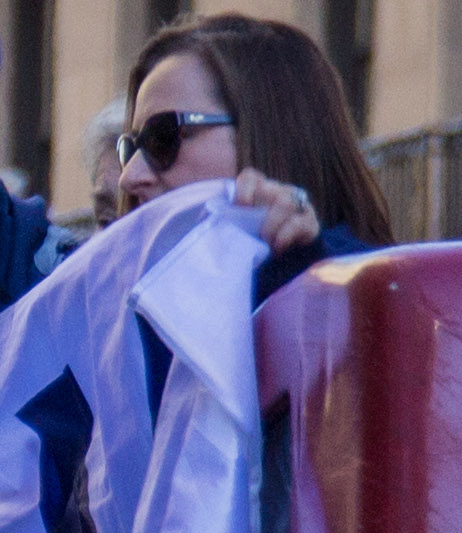
Ricketts holding a Cubs Win Flag during the 2016 World Series victory parade

On July 6, 2009, the Chicago Tribune reported that the Ricketts family had reached an agreement with the Tribune Company to purchase the Cubs, Wrigley Field, and 25% of Comcast SportsNet Chicago. Final approval came by a unanimous vote of the other MLB owners in an October 6, 2009, conference call. On October 27, 2009, the Ricketts family, with Thomas S. Ricketts as board chairman, officially took over 95% ownership of the Chicago Cubs, Wrigley Field and 25% ownership of Comcast SportsNet Chicago for a purchase price of $845 million. The Tribune retained 5% ownership.

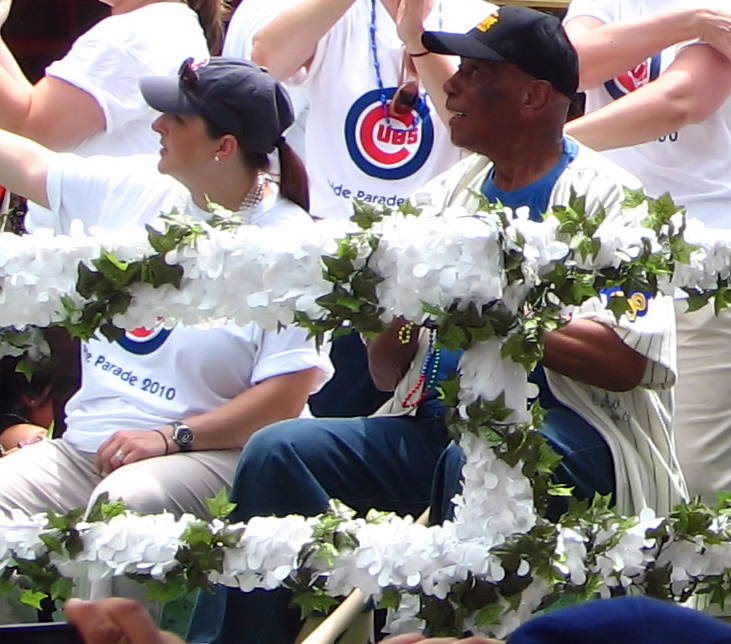
Ricketts representing the Cubs organization at the 2010 Chicago Pride Parade, accompanied by former Cubs player Ernie Banks

Laura Ricketts joins her three brothers, Tom, Pete and Todd, on the board of the Chicago Cubs. Her brother Tom is the chairman and led the acquisition. NBC Sports highlights the significance of Laura Ricketts ownership standing: "Not only has there never been an openly gay sports team owner before, but there have been next to no gay players -- at least none who were willing to admit it before their retirement." Christman of NBC Sports was able to cite three cases in MLB history of job loss suspectedly due to sexual orientation. Christman adds that "perhaps with a lesbian now on the board of a Major League team, some athlete will be able to come out of the closet while still working in a professional sports franchise and not lose their job."

== Chicago Stars FC ==
In the aftermath of the 2021 NWSL abuse scandal, the players of the National Women's Soccer League's (NWSL) Chicago Stars FC (named the Chicago Red Stars at the time) called on owner Arnim Whisler to sell his stake in the club. Whisler had been named in an independent report that ultimately forced the resignation or termination of many managers and front office personnel throughout the league. On December 5, 2022, Whisler announced that he would be selling his stake in the team.

On August 15, 2023, it was announced that a group of Chicago business leaders, led by Laura Ricketts, had agreed to purchase the team for $60 million. Of the $60 million, $35.5 million went towards the purchase of the team and $25.5 million was ear-marked for future investment in the team.

== Lambda Legal ==
Ricketts serves on the National Leadership Council of Lambda Legal, the "nation's oldest and largest civil rights organization for lesbians, gay men, bisexuals, transgender people, and people living with HIV/AIDS". Ricketts' work with Lambda Legal's Midwest Regional Office in Chicago has advanced lesbian and gay legal rights in the Midwest, including several legal victories. Most prominent are Lambda Legal's efforts to legalize same-sex marriage Iowa, 2009, where Ricketts served in a leadership and financier role. Camilla Taylor, senior staff attorney for Lambda Legal, is known as the "lead architect" of Varnum v. Brien, in which the Iowa Supreme Court upheld a 2007 district court ruling that said it was unconstitutional for Iowa to bar same-sex couples from marrying. Ricketts' philanthropy includes support for other charitable organizations like the Housing Opportunities for Women organization and Howard Brown Health Center, a Chicago provider of health services for LGBT people.

== Awards and honors ==
- 2016 World Series champion (as part owner of the Chicago Cubs)
