= Thinkorswim =

Electronic trading platform

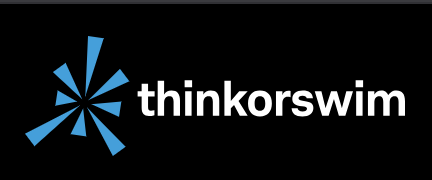
- Available in: English
- Type: Electronic trading platform
- Website: trade.thinkorswim.com

Thinkorswim is an electronic trading platform owned by Charles Schwab Corporation. It is geared for self-directed stock, options and futures traders.

== History ==
Thinkorswim, Inc. was founded in 1999 by Tom Sosnoff and Scott Sheridan as an online brokerage specializing in options. It was funded by Technology Crossover Ventures. In February 2007, Investools acquired Thinkorswim.

In January 2009, it was acquired by TD Ameritrade for $225 million of cash and 28 million shares of TD Ameritrade. The final sale value was $749 million and included 250,000 thinkorswim accounts. At the time, thinkorswim led the industry in the number of retail option trades per day. Lee Barbra was CEO. In 2018, with Thinkorswim, Ameritrade became the first US retail broker-dealer to launch 24/5 trading platforms, which it did for a few exchange-traded funds through the thinkorswim platforms. In early 2018, thinkorswim expanded into Hong Kong.

In October 2020, Charles Schwab Corporation acquired TD Ameritrade and the thinkorswim platform became available for Charles Schwab customers. Charles Schwab integrated Thinkorswim into its platform.

In 2023, Charles Schwab customers were given access to thinkorswim. In 2025, the thinkorswim platform added 24/5 trading on many S&P 500 and Nasdaq-100 stocks, after testing the feature as a pilot in November 2024.

== See also ==
- List of electronic trading platforms
