= Seana Kofoed =

American actress

- Born: August 13, 1970 (age 55); Wilmette, Illinois, U.S.
- Occupation: Actress
- Years active: 1999–present
- Spouse: Jason Antoon (2010 - present)
- Children: 2

Seana Kofoed (born August 13, 1970 in Wilmette, Illinois) is an American television and stage actress.

== Early life ==
Kofoed was raised in the Chicago area and attended New Trier High School, Northwestern University and the Royal National Theatre in London. She began her stage career in Chicago, appearing in productions at the Goodman Theatre, the Court Theatre and the Victory Gardens Theater, before moving to New York City.

== Later career ==
In New York, Kofoed was best known for productions on and off Broadway. Her Broadway credits include Proof with Jennifer Jason Leigh and Night Must Fall with Matthew Broderick. Off Broadway credits include several productions at Manhattan Theatre Club, the Atlantic Theatre Company, and Manhattan Class Company, in addition to experiences in Glimmer, Glimmer, and Shine with the late John Spencer and An Experiment with an Air Pump, for which she received a Drama Desk Nomination for Best Supporting Actress.

Kofoed soon made the transition to on-camera acting, making an appearance on Law & Order: Special Victims Unit and lending her voice to a small role in the movie Shark Tale. In 2006, she was cast in the hit dramedy Men in Trees, playing the lead character Marin's (Anne Heche) editor and best friend, Jane.

in 2018, Kofoed was cast as a series regular on Lifetime's American Princess.

== Personal life ==
Kofoed is married to actor Jason Antoon; they have two children.

== Filmography ==
=== Film ===
Year	Title	Role	Notes
2005	It's About Time	Sara	
2011	8 Minutes	Denise	Short film
2013	Life of Crime	Kay	

=== Television ===
Year	Title	Role	Notes
1999	Third Watch	Lorraine Hickman	Episode: "Responsible Parties"
2000	Law & Order: Special Victims Unit	Lois Green	Episode: "Limitations"
2000	The Audrey Hepburn Story	Kay Kendall	TV film
2001	Ed	Agnes Bushner	Episode: "Pilot"
2003	Queens Supreme	Ms. Patricia Olson	Episode: "Pilot"
2004	Windy Acres	Stephanie Burns	Main role
2004	Humor Me	Denise Frome	TV film
2004	Shark Tale	Lola / Various (voice)	Video game
2006	Just a Phase	Hannah	TV film
2006-2008	Men in Trees	Jane Burns	Recurring role
2008	Valentine	Alexandra 'Xan' Thompson	Episode: "The Book of Love"
2009	Numb3rs	Caitlin Dawes	Episode: "Jacked"
2009	The Mentalist	Mrs. Kent	Episode: "Red Bulls"
2010	FlashForward	Charlene Collins	Episode: "Revelation Zero: Parts 1 & 2"
2010	Vamped Out	Marie	Recurring role
2010	Donna's Revenge	Donna	Main role
2011	Men of a Certain Age	Lizzie	Episode: "Let the Sunshine In"
2011	Mad	Lady Gaga / Sally / Wife (voice)	Episode: "So You Think You Can Train Your Dragon How to Dance / Yo Gagga Gagga!"
2011	The Big C	Julie	Episode: "A Little Death"
2012	Electric City	Mrs. Bean (voice)	TV series short
2012	Major Crimes	Susan Hall	Episode: "Citizen's Arrest"
2013	Rules of Engagement	Evelyn	Episode: "Catering"
2013	Suburgatory	Beatrice	Episode: "Decemberfold"
2014	Raising Hope	Doris	Episode: "Man's Best Friend"
2014	I Didn't Do It	Leanne Park	Episode: "Twin It to Win It"
2014	The Young and the Restless	Madame Isadora	Recurring role
2015	NCIS		Episode: "Lockdown"
2015	The Devil You Know		TV miniseries, pre-production
2016	Flaked	Vanessa Weiss	
2019	American Princess	Maggie	Main cast
2019	Claws	Gretch	Recurring role
2020	Stumptown	DDA Valerie Kasra	Recurring role
2020	All Rise	Rhonda McReady	Episode: "I Love You, You're Perfect, I Think"
2021	9-1-1: Lone Star	Margaret Gilbert	Episode: "Dust to Dust"
2021 - 2024	NCIS: Hawaiʻi	Commander (Dr.) Carla Chase	Recurring Role
