= DNAinfo =

Online news service that focused on New York City and Chicago

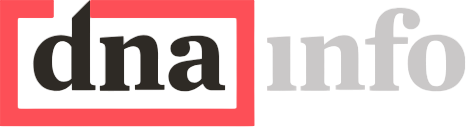
- Editor-in-chief: John Ness
- Format: Digital; Mobile device
- Founder: Joe Ricketts
- Founded: November 2009
- First issue: November 1, 2009
- Final issue: November 2, 2017
- Company: New Media News, LLC
- Country: United States
- Based in: New York, New York; Chicago
- Language: English
- Website: www.dnainfo.com/new-york/ www.dnainfo.com/chicago/

DNAinfo was an online newspaper that focused on neighborhood news in New York City and Chicago. It was closed down by CEO and owner Joe Ricketts in November 2017 after writers in its New York branch voted to unionize, a move Ricketts opposed.

== History ==
Founded by Joe Ricketts in November 2009 as "Digital Network Associates", DNAinfo.com began by offering online, hyperlocal coverage for New York City and online coverage for Chicago launched in November 2012. In December 2013, DNAinfo launched a print version coverage by the name, DNAinfo.com. The operational and editorial offices for DNAinfo were in New York and Chicago. DNAinfo is also a registered trademark.

In March 2017, DNAinfo purchased the New York media company Gothamist.

On November 2, 2017, Ricketts posted to both DNAinfo and the "-ist" network sites that both websites would immediately cease operations, a week after Gothamist writers voted to unionize with the Writers Guild of America, East. All content from all DNAinfo sites and all subsidiary sites were taken down. The next day, archives of the sites were returned to functionality. Ricketts's shutdown was criticized as being an act of retaliation after the two companies' workers had joined a union.

After DNAinfo shutdown, three of the Chicago newspaper's former editors decided to launch their own independent hyperlocal news organization. Within a few months, Block Club Chicago had raised more than $183,000 on Kickstarter. By the end of 2018, after 6 months of publishing, Block Club Chicago had more than 6,000 paid subscribers and over 7 million pageviews.
