= Incapital =

American financial-services company

- Company type: Privately held
- Industry: Financial services
- Founded: 1999; 26 years ago
- Founder: Thomas S. Ricketts
- Headquarters: Chicago, Illinois
- Number of employees: 150

Incapital LLC is an American financial-services company that originates, underwrites and distributes fixed-income and market-linked securities to retail and institutional investors through a network of more than 800 broker-dealers, banks and wealth-management firms. Headquartered in Chicago, the privately held company maintains major offices in Delray Beach, Florida. In February 2021 it announced a merger with San-Francisco–based 280 CapMarkets to create the fintech broker-dealer InspereX.

== History ==
Incapital was founded in 1999 by Chairman Thomas S. Ricketts(also Executive Chairman of the Chicago Cubs) to provide securities firms and individual investors access to corporate bonds.

In 2000 the firm introduced the InterNotes programme, a continuous-offering shelf that allows corporate and agency borrowers to issue medium-term notes in US$1,000 denominations via Incapital’s web platform. By April 2008 InterNotes had channelled more than US$201 billion in retail bonds for 41 corporate issuers and several federal-agency borrowers. A 2003 variant—Inflation-Protected InterNotes—was launched jointly with Banc of America Securities to hedge retail investors against rising prices. Sovereign issuers also used the platform: in 2006 the Government of Mexico unveiled a retail funding exercise under the InterNotes banner.

== Structure ==
Incapital is a privately held firm with roughly 150 employees. It is headquartered in Delray Beach, Florida and has additional offices in Chicago, Illinois.

== Educational initiatives ==
The company began structured-product accreditation seminars for financial advisers in 2005 and relaunched the programme in 2014 with interactive continuing-education modules on derivatives pay-offs and risk management.

== Awards and recognition ==
Trade journal Structured Products (Risk.net) has repeatedly cited Incapital’s technology and distribution strength, naming it “U.S. Distributor of the Year” in its Americas awards programme, including the 2012 and 2013 editions.

== Merger and creation of InspereX ==
On 18 February 2021 Bloomberg News reported that Incapital would merge with 280 CapMarkets to form InspereX, a fintech broker-dealer focused on fixed-income price transparency. In November 2021 Institutional Investor reported that Goldman Sachs Advisor Solutions entered an exclusive white-label agreement for InspereX’s BondNav trading engine and increased its equity stake in the venture.
