= Joe Ricketts =

American businessman (born 1941)

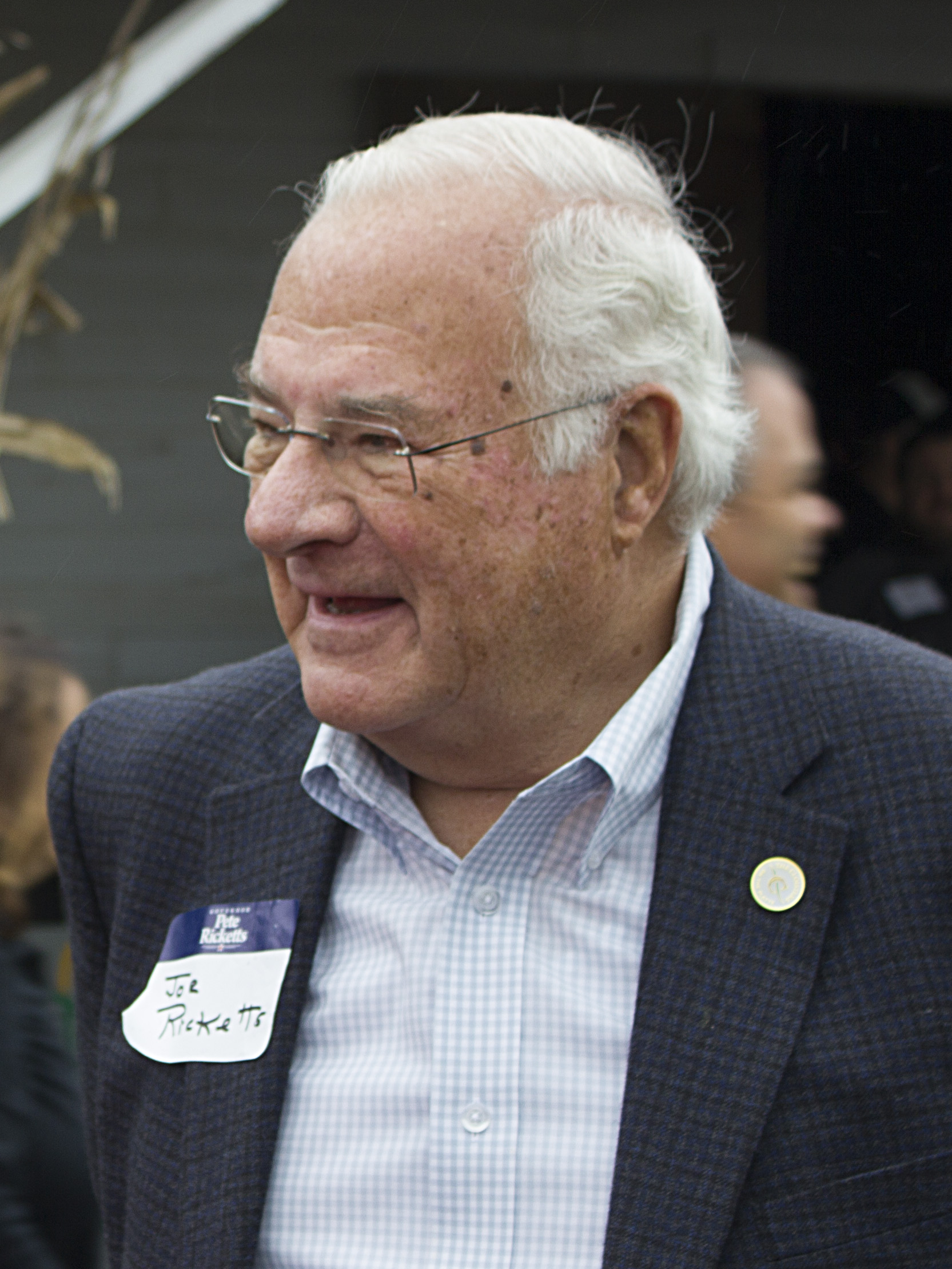
- Ricketts in 2018
- Born: July 16, 1941 (age 85); Nebraska City, Nebraska, U.S.
- Education: Creighton University (BA)
- Occupations: Businessman; MLB owner/executive
- Known for: founding TD Ameritrade
- Title: Owner, Chicago Cubs
- Political party: Republican
- Spouse: Marlene Volkmer (m. 1963)
- Children: Pete; Thomas; Laura; Todd
- Website: JoeRicketts.com

John Joseph Ricketts (born July 16, 1941) is an American businessman. A billionaire, he has an estimated net worth of US$4.1 billion (2024) according to Forbes. He established his wealth as the founder of TD Ameritrade, an online stockbroker in the United States.

He and his family have been the owners of the Major League Baseball team the Chicago Cubs since October 2009. That same year, Ricketts founded DNAinfo.com, a digital news service that used to cover neighborhood news in New York City and Chicago. Ricketts shut it down on November 2, 2017, one week after their employees voted to unionize. He is a prominent donor to right-wing causes.

In 2019, Ricketts became the subject of controversy after Splinter News released a cache of his personal emails from 2009 to 2014. The revealed content included support for conspiracy theories about Barack Obama's citizenship and religion, racial slurs, and jokes about non-white people dying. After the emails were made public he apologized.

== Early and personal life ==
John Joseph Ricketts was born and raised in Nebraska City, Nebraska, the son of Florence M. (Erhart) and Donavon Platte Ricketts. He attended St. Bernard's Academy in Nebraska City, where he met his future wife Marlene Margaret (Volkmer). They both graduated in 1959. He obtained a bachelor's degree from Creighton University in Omaha, Nebraska in 1968. Joe and Marlene Ricketts have four children, Pete, Thomas, Laura, and Todd, who were raised Catholic. He currently resides in Hoback Basin, Wyoming.

Regarding his time in Omaha during the 1960s, Ricketts wrote in his 2019 memoir The Harder You Work, the Luckier You Get about "stockbrokers destroying their lives with dope, alcohol, and sex, which was just another kind of drug":

Our substance of choice was beer. Beer, whatever its drawbacks, is not dope. Marlene generally did not come out for drinks on Friday at the Rookery. She went home and got supper ready for the children. Often, I did not get home in time to eat with them. I might have had twelve beers on a Friday evening. I might have had more. I'm sure there were a few nights that it was only by the grace of God that I didn't have a car accident. But it was only beer and it helped me get rid of all my pent-up stress. I got myself home, and our family and our business could press on together.

=== Racist emails and conspiracy theories ===
On February 5, 2019, Splinter News released a cache of Ricketts emails from 2009 to 2014. He wrote that Islam was not compatible with a civil society, that "we cannot ever let Islam become a large part of our society", that "Muslims are naturally my (our) enemy," and that he believed Islam "is a cult and not a religion" and that it is "based on 'kill the infidel' a thing of evil." His emails contained conspiracy theories about Barack Obama's citizenship, and about Obama's religion, including claims that he favored Islam over other religions. Also included were multiple racist "joke" emails that he received and responded to positively; including racial slurs and jokes with punchlines about people of color dying. He apologized for the emails after they were made public.

== Business ventures ==
=== TD Ameritrade ===
In 1975, Ricketts and a few partners invested $12,500 each to form First Omaha Securities, a retail securities brokerage firm that through mergers and acquisitions grew into TD Ameritrade. Ricketts retired from the TD Ameritrade board in October 2011 to concentrate on entrepreneurship and philanthropy.

=== High Plains Bison ===
In 2004, Ricketts founded High Plains Bison, a retailer of natural bison meat. In addition to online and offline sales channels, High Plains Bison is the official bison vendor at Chicago's Wrigley Field. Some of the bison are raised on a Wyoming ranch owned by Ricketts. A four-bedroom lodge named The Lodge at Jackson Fork Ranch is located on the same property. Joe Rickett's Grizzly Ridge Bison Ranch in northern Montana comes at the expense of the Blackfeet tribe's wild herd; it represents 2% of their ancestral lands, which the tribe were deprived of despite trying to buy back their own land.

=== The American Film Company ===
In 2008, Ricketts founded The American Film Company, which produces feature films about true stories from American history. The Conspirator is a 2010 historical drama film directed by Robert Redford. It served as the debut film of The American Film Company.

=== Chicago Cubs ===
In October 2009, the Ricketts family acquired a 95 percent controlling interest in Major League Baseball's Chicago Cubs and Wrigley Field, as well as 20% of Comcast Sportsnet Chicago. The Ricketts family represents the eighth ownership group in the 133-year history of the team. While Ricketts is not directly involved in the team's operations, his son, Tom Ricketts, is Cubs chairman and his three other children (Pete, Laura and Todd) are on the board of directors. In 2016, seven years after purchasing the Cubs, they won the World Series, ending a 108-year-old drought without a championship.

=== DNAinfo.com ===
In 2009, Ricketts founded DNAinfo.com, a digital news service that used to cover neighborhood news in New York City and Chicago. Ricketts shut it down on November 2, 2017, one week after their employees voted to unionize. Gone with it were Gothamist, Chicagoist, DCist, LAist, SFist, and Shanghaiist. On November 3, 2017, archived versions of Gothamist, DNAinfo, and other sites were back up. In September 2017, Ricketts wrote, "I believe unions promote a corrosive us-against-them dynamic that destroys the esprit de corps businesses need to succeed."

=== Straight Arrow News ===
In 2021, Ricketts launched another digital news service, Straight Arrow News, this time with national coverage. It was announced as a "trustworthy source of news and information – a straight arrow that hits the bullseye" and currently positions itself as "Unbiased. Straight facts". While the company is based in Omaha, Nebraska, it employs journalists throughout the country. In addition to original reporting, Straight Arrow News operates in partnership with Ground News for some of its news output. In 2025, it employed new senior staff to start a monetization strategy.

Ricketts closed Straight Arrow News in November 2026. Like with the closure of DNAinfo.com, news outlets reported that the closure of Straight Arrow News was abrupt, announced to employees and the public on the same day.

== Political activities ==
Ricketts co-founded the Campaign for Primary Accountability (CPA) with Eric O'Keefe, Leo Linbeck III, and Tim Dunn. It targets both Democratic and Republican incumbents in primary elections.

In 2010, Ricketts led a campaign against earmarks and what he perceived to be wasteful federal spending. Ricketts founded an independent organization called Taxpayers Against Earmarks that classified every Member of Congress as either a spending "hero" or "hooligan."

Along with Taxpayers for Common Sense and WashingtonWatch.com, Taxpayers Against Earmarks developed a database of earmarks requested by members of Congress. The group successfully pressed for a moratorium on earmarks in 2010. Taxpayers Against Earmarks changed its name to Ending Spending in 2011, as part of a broadening of the group's focus.

Ricketts established and funded The Ending Spending Fund, a political action committee, in 2010. The Ending Spending Fund spent over $1 million sponsoring independent advertisements in several Congressional races. The goal of the advertising expenditure was to highlight incumbents' earmark-related policies. The Ending Spending Fund spent the largest amount of its money on the United States Senate election in Nevada, 2010 in an unsuccessful effort to defeat Senate Majority Leader Harry Reid. Although not required by law, Ricketts willingly disclosed his identity due to his belief in transparency.

Ricketts served on the board of trustees of the American Enterprise Institute from 1999 to 2007. His son, Pete Ricketts, is a member of the Republican National Committee, was elected governor of Nebraska in 2014, and is currently a U.S. senator. His daughter, Laura Ricketts, is a gay rights activist and prominent bundler for Barack Obama. Another son, Todd Ricketts, was named CEO of Ending Spending in 2013.

On May 17, 2012, The New York Times published a story by Jeff Zeleny and Jim Rutenberg reporting that The Ending Spending Action fund had been presented with a 54-page proposal entitled, "The Defeat of Barack Hussein Obama: the Ricketts Plan to End His Spending for Good." According to the Times, the proposal, written by a vendor seeking to be hired by Ending Spending, suggested a $10-million ad campaign to "attack President Obama in ways that Republicans have so far shied away" and called for "running commercials linking Mr. Obama to incendiary comments by his former spiritual adviser, the Reverend Jeremiah A. Wright." The report came to light when an unidentified person, who was not connected to the proposal, leaked it to The New York Times. The president of the Ending Spending Action Fund said that the pitch was a "nonstarter" and issued the following statement repudiating the proposal: "Not only was this plan merely a proposal—one of several submitted to the Ending Spending Action Fund by third-party vendors—but it reflects an approach to politics that Mr. Ricketts rejects and it was never a plan to be accepted but only a suggestion for a direction to take."

As of mid-2014, the Ending Spending SuperPac had supported only Republicans.

In the 2016 presidential election, Ricketts donated at least one million dollars in support of Donald Trump. Ricketts also raised funds for the Future45 Super Pac and the 45Committee, a pro-Trump 501(c)4 organization that is not required to disclose its donors. During the Republican primaries, Ricketts had contributed to Our Principles PAC, a Super PAC dedicated to opposing Trump. Ricketts explained his changed position citing economic grounds, stating that Hillary Clinton "represents four more years of the Obama-Clinton economic policies that continue to cripple the middle class."

Together with his spouse, Ricketts contributed $2.2 million to Donald Trump's 2020 presidential campaign.

== Philanthropy ==
Ricketts established Opportunity Education, which is a non-profit organization that empowers teachers with research-backed resources and support to help their students develop the skills they need to succeed in school and beyond.

On September 26, 2013, Louisiana College president Joe W. Aguillard presented Ricketts and his brother, Jim, with two of three Trustees' Distinguished Service Awards at the annual Founder's Day chapel.
