= TD Ameritrade =

American online broker

TD Ameritrade Holding Corporation

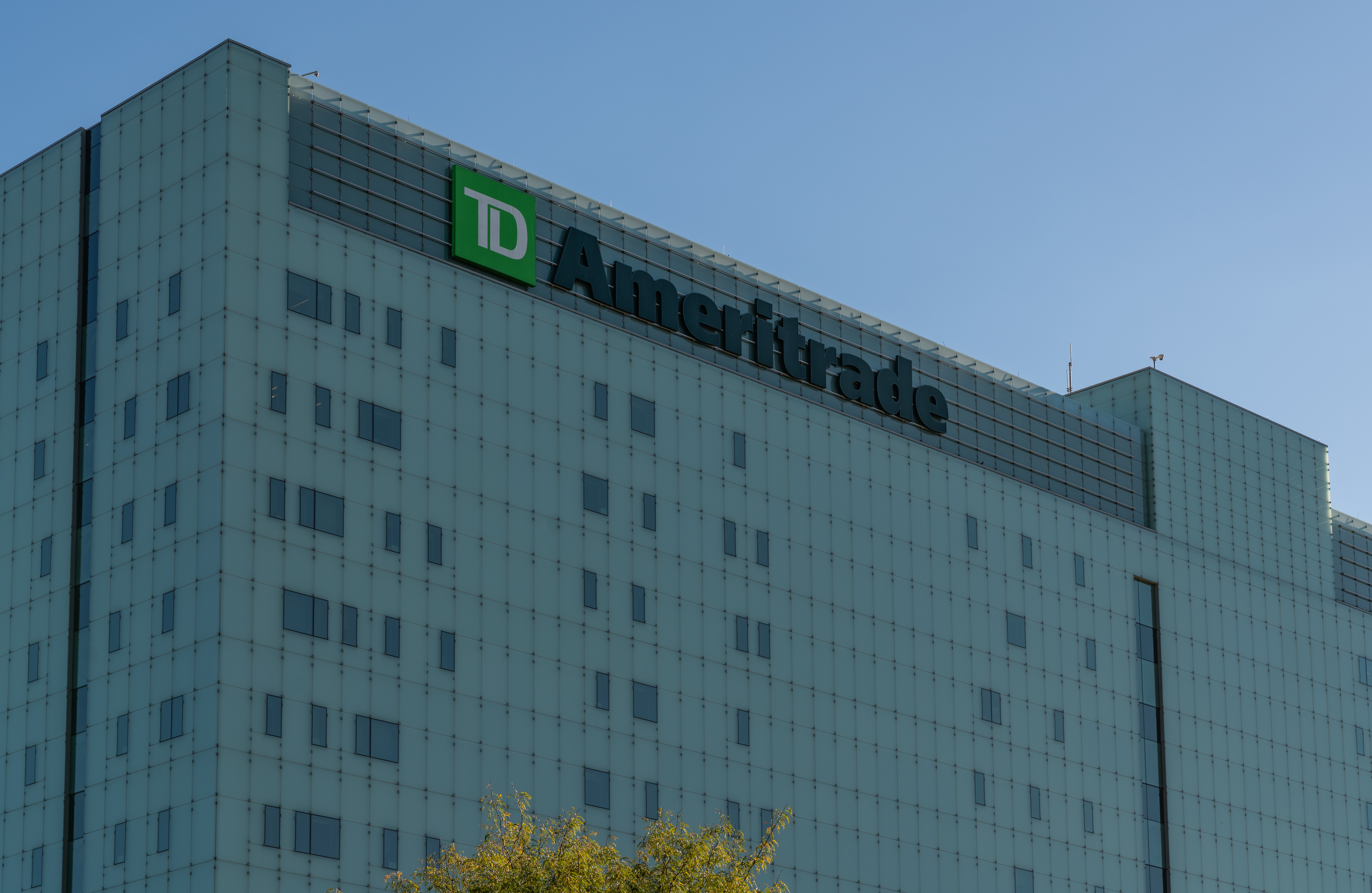
- Former Corporate headquarters, in Omaha, Nebraska
- Type: Private
- Traded as: Nasdaq: AMTD
- Industry: Financial services
- Founded: 1975; 51 years ago (as First Omaha Securities)
- Founder: Joe Ricketts
- Defunct: 2024
- Fate: Acquired by Charles Schwab Corporation and shut down
- Headquarters: Omaha, Nebraska, United States
- Key people: Steve Boyle (Interim president and CEO)
- Services: Stockbroker; Electronic trading platform
- Revenue: ▼$4.358 billion (Q3 2020)
- Operating income: ▼$1.930 billion (Q3 2020)
- Net income: ▼$1.393 billion (Q3 2020)
- Total assets: ▲$54.394 billion (2020)
- Total equity: ▲$9.568 billion (Q3 2020)
- Number of employees: 8,939 (2020)
- Parent: Charles Schwab Corporation
- Website: Archived official website at the Wayback Machine (archive index)

TD Ameritrade Holding Corporation was a stockbroker that offered an electronic trading platform for the trade of financial assets, which was acquired by Charles Schwab Corporation in 2020.

The company was founded in 1975 as First Omaha Securities. In 2006, it acquired the United States operations of TD Waterhouse from Toronto-Dominion Bank and was renamed TD Ameritrade.

== History ==
In 1975, the company was founded as First Omaha Securities by Joe Ricketts. In 1983, Ameritrade Clearing Inc. was established as a central counterparty clearing broker. In 1988, the company introduced the first quote and order entry system via the push-button telephone.

In March 1997, the company became a public company via an initial public offering. In 2006, Ameritrade purchased the American operations of TD Waterhouse from TD Bank Group. The combined company was renamed TD Ameritrade, and TD Bank Group was given a 39% stake in the company. As part of the deal, Ameritrade sold its Canadian operations to TD Bank who merged them with TD Waterhouse Canada.

In November 2007, the company reported that hackers gained access to most of its clients' names, Social Security numbers, dates of birth, addresses, phone numbers, and trading activity. In 2011, after being sued in a class action, the company settled by agreeing to compensate customers that were victim to identity theft between $50 and $2,500 each. The settlement was criticized for netting the attorneys almost as much money as the victims. In 2020, customer login information was being sold on the dark web.

The company and its registered advisors recommended to its customers to invest cash holdings in a money market fund that was an affiliate of the Reserve Primary Fund and the fund gained approximately $1 billion in assets as a result of such marketing by the company. It also represented that an affiliated fund, the Reserve Yield Plus, was a safe money market fund, when it actually was a bond fund. The company received commissions for steering customers. In September 2008, during the 2008 financial crisis, as a result of holdings in securities of Lehman Brothers, the Reserve Primary Fund was forced to break the buck and $1 billion in cash equivalents of TD Ameritrade clients were frozen and the Reserve Yield Plus declined in value. The company was accused of having a conflict of interest as a result of commissions that it received, for having poor marketing ethics, and for misrepresenting the safety of the investments. The company was named in class action lawsuits by its customers and the U.S. Securities and Exchange Commission launched an investigation into its marketing practices. In 2008, the company agreed to reimburse its customers for up to a 3% loss in the Reserve Primary Fund, or up to $50 million. In 2011, the company settled the SEC case and agreed to pay 1.2¢ per share of the Reserve Yield Plus Fund that was held by its customers, or $10 million in total. The Reserve Yield Plus made its final distribution in 2016 and investors received 97 to 98 cents per share in addition to compensation from TD Ameritrade.

In January 2009, TD Ameritrade acquired thinkorswim in a cash and stock deal valued around $606 million. In 2013, the company opened a $250 million headquarters in Omaha. In 2017, the company acquired the stock brokerage division of Scottrade. In April 2018, TD Ameritrade and Havas placed the first advertisement inserted within the bitcoin blockchain.

In July 2009, TD Ameritrade settled a lawsuit alleging it had marketed auction rate securities as short-term investments. The settlement included a $456 million payment and the buyback of the securities, compensating investors for losses.

In 2020, Charles Schwab Corporation acquired TD Ameritrade and the platform was shut down in May 2024 after all accounts were transitioned.

In September 2022, the Reserve Bank of India (RBI), India's central bank, released a list of 34 forex trading online platforms, in which TD Ameritrade was listed as an illegal platform in India.

=== Management history ===
In May 2008, CEO Joe Moglia vacated the CEO position, becoming Chairman. He was succeeded as CEO by COO Fredric Tomczyk. In 2016, Tomczyk resigned as CEO and was succeeded by Tim Hockey. In 2020, CEO Tim Hockey resigned amid a disagreement with the board relating to the growth of the company. In July 2020, Joe Moglia retired from his role as Chairman of the Board of TD Ameritrade.

=== Acquisition history ===
#	Year	Company	Ref(s).
1	1995	K. Aufhauser & Company, Inc.	
2	September 1996	TransTerra	
3	February 2001	TradeCast	
4	July 2001	National Discount Brokers	
5	September 2002	Datek	
6	June 2003	MyDiscountBroker.com	
7	January 2004	Bidwell	
8	February 2004	BrokerageAmerica	
9	October 2004	JB Oxford and Company	
10	January 2006	TD Waterhouse - U.S. brokerage division	
11	February 2008	Fiserv brokerage unit	
12	January 2009	Thinkorswim	
13	September 2017	Scottrade	

== Sponsorships ==
The company owned the naming rights to the baseball field TD Ameritrade Park Omaha, for which it would pay an average of $1 million a year for a twenty-year contract period starting in 2011. After the acquisition by Charles Schwab Corporation, they retained ownership of the naming rights; the baseball venue was subsequently renamed Charles Schwab Field Omaha.
