= 2016 Nebraska Legislature election =

- November 8, 2016; Officially nonpartisan

25 out of 49 seats in the Nebraska Legislature 25 seats needed for a majority

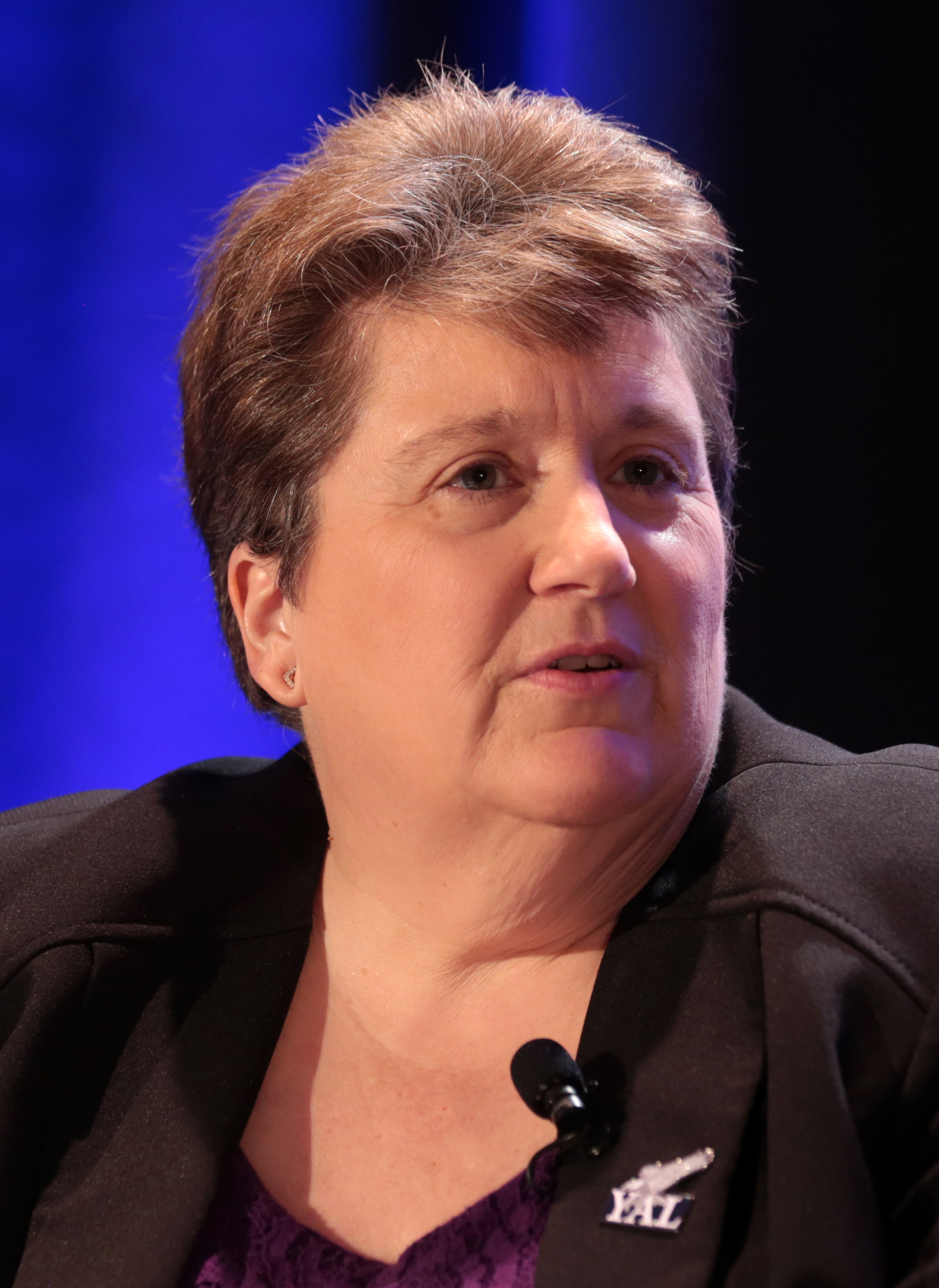
| | Majority party | Minority party |
|---|---|---|
| Leader | Galen Hadley (term-limited) | None |
| Party | Republican | Democratic |
| Leader since | January 7, 2015 |
| Leader's seat | District 37 |
| Last election | 35 | 13 |
| Seats after | 31 | 16 |
| Seat change | ▼4 | ▲3 |
| | Third party | Fourth party |
| Leader | Ernie Chambers (de facto) | Laura Ebke (de facto) |
| Party | Independent | Libertarian |
| Leader since | January 9, 2013 | January 7, 2015 |
| Leader's seat | District 11 | District 32 |
| Last election | 1 | 0 |
| Seats after | 1 | 1 (Note: Switched from Republican to Libertarian in 2016.) |
| Seat change | Steady | Steady |
- Democratic gain Republican gain Democratic hold Republican hold Independent hold
Speaker before election
Galen Hadley
Republican
Elected Speaker
Jim Scheer
Republican

The 2016 Nebraska Legislature election was held on November 8, 2016, to determine which party would control the Nebraska Legislature for the following two years in the 105th Nebraska legislature. The 25 odd-numbered seats out of 49 seats in the Nebraska Legislature were up for election and the primary was held on May 10, 2016. Prior to the election, 35 seats were held by Republicans, 13 seats were held by Democrats and 1 seat was held by an independent. The general election saw Democrats gaining 3 seats, this however meant that Republicans maintained their majority in the State Legislature.

== Retirements ==
=== Democrats ===
1. District 5: Heath Mello was term-limited.
2. District 13: Tanya Cook was term-limited.
3. District 21: Ken Haar was term-limited.
4. District 41: Kate Sullivan was term-limited.

=== Republicans ===
1. District 17: Dave Bloomfield was term-limited.
2. District 25: Kathy Campbell was term-limited.
3. District 27: Colby Coash was term-limited.
4. District 35: Mike Gloor was term-limited.
5. District 37: Galen Hadley was term-limited.
6. District 39: Beau McCoy was term-limited.
7. District 47: Ken Schilz was term-limited.

== Defeated incumbents ==
=== In primary ===
==== Republicans ====
1. District 7: Nicole Fox lost the primary to Democrats Tony Vargas and John Synowiecki.

=== In general ===
==== Republicans ====
1. District 3: Tommy Garrett lost re-election to Democrat Carol Blood.
2. District 15: David Schnoor lost re-election to Democrat Lynne Walz.
3. District 23: Jerry Johnson lost re-election to fellow Republican Bruce Bostelman.
4. District 33: Les Seiler lost re-election to fellow Republican Steve Halloran.
5. District 43: Al Davis lost re-election to fellow Republican Tom Brewer.

== Closest races ==
Seats where the margin of victory was under 10%:

1. District 35, 0.66% (gain)
2. District 13, 2.32%
3. District 15, 2.78% (gain)
4. District 3, 3.12% (gain)
5. District 31, 4.14%
6. District 43, 4.52%
7. District 37, 6.52%
8. District 39, 9.74%

== Results (Note: All Nebraska state legislative elections are technically non-partisan; therefore, parties listed here are from candidates' websites and official party endorsement lists. Candidates all appear on the ballot without party labels..) ==
=== District 1 ===
District 1 election, 2016
| Party | Candidate | Votes | % |
|---|---|---|---|
| Republican | Dan Watermeier (incumbent) | 13,916 | 100.0% |
| Total votes | | 13,916 | 100.0% |
| Republican hold | | | |

=== District 3 ===
District 3 election, 2016
| Party | Candidate | Votes | % |
|---|---|---|---|
| Democratic | Carol Blood | 7,959 | 51.56% |
| Republican | Tommy Garrett (incumbent) | 7,476 | 48.44% |
| Total votes | | 15,435 | 100.0% |
| Democratic gain from Republican | | | |

=== District 5 ===
District 5 election, 2016
| Party | Candidate | Votes | % |
|---|---|---|---|
| Democratic | Mike McDonnell | 7,120 | 70.16% |
| Republican | Gilbert Ayala | 3,028 | 29.84% |
| Total votes | | 10,148 | 100.0% |
| Democratic hold | | | |

=== District 7 ===
District 7 election, 2016
| Party | Candidate | Votes | % |
|---|---|---|---|
| Democratic | Tony Vargas | 5,244 | 61.75% |
| Democratic | John Synowiecki | 3,248 | 38.25% |
| Total votes | | 8,492 | 100.0% |
| Democratic gain from Republican | | | |

=== District 9 ===
District 9 election, 2016
| Party | Candidate | Votes | % |
|---|---|---|---|
| Democratic | Sara Howard (incumbent) | 10,552 | 79.19% |
| Nonpartisan | Larry Roland | 2,773 | 20.81% |
| Total votes | | 13,325 | 100.0% |
| Democratic hold | | | |

=== District 11 ===
District 11 election, 2016
| Party | Candidate | Votes | % |
|---|---|---|---|
| Independent | Ernie Chambers (incumbent) | 7,763 | 81.81% |
| Nonpartisan | John Sciara | 1,726 | 18.19% |
| Total votes | | 9,489 | 100.0% |
| Independent hold | | | |

=== District 13 ===
District 13 election, 2016
| Party | Candidate | Votes | % |
|---|---|---|---|
| Democratic | Justin Wayne | 6,920 | 51.16% |
| Nonpartisan | Jill Brown | 6,605 | 48.84% |
| Total votes | | 13,525 | 100.0% |
| Democratic hold | | | |

=== District 15 ===
District 15 election, 2016
| Party | Candidate | Votes | % |
|---|---|---|---|
| Democratic | Lynne Walz | 7,601 | 51.39% |
| Republican | David Schnoor (incumbent) | 7,189 | 48.61% |
| Total votes | | 14,790 | 100.0% |
| Democratic gain from Republican | | | |

=== District 17 ===
District 17 election, 2016
| Party | Candidate | Votes | % |
|---|---|---|---|
| Republican | Joni Albrecht | 6,825 | 60.53% |
| Nonpartisan | Ardel Bengtson | 4,451 | 39.47% |
| Total votes | | 11,276 | 100.0% |
| Republican hold | | | |

=== District 19 ===
District 19 election, 2016
| Party | Candidate | Votes | % |
|---|---|---|---|
| Republican | Jim Scheer (incumbent) | 12,908 | 100.0% |
| Total votes | | 12,908 | 100.0% |
| Republican hold | | | |

=== District 21 ===
District 21 election, 2016
| Party | Candidate | Votes | % |
|---|---|---|---|
| Republican | Mike Hilgers | 8,588 | 56.67% |
| Nonpartisan | Larry Scherer | 6,567 | 43.33% |
| Total votes | | 15,155 | 100.0% |
| Republican gain from Democratic | | | |

=== District 23 ===
District 23 election, 2016
| Party | Candidate | Votes | % |
|---|---|---|---|
| Republican | Bruce Bostelman | 8,693 | 55.57% |
| Republican | Jerry Johnson (incumbent) | 6,950 | 44.43% |
| Total votes | | 15,643 | 100.0% |
| Republican hold | | | |

=== District 25 ===
District 25 election, 2016
| Party | Candidate | Votes | % |
|---|---|---|---|
| Republican | Suzanne Geist | 12,899 | 55.70% |
| Democratic | Jim Gordon | 10,258 | 44.30% |
| Total votes | | 23,157 | 100.0% |
| Republican hold | | | |

=== District 27 ===
District 27 election, 2016
| Party | Candidate | Votes | % |
|---|---|---|---|
| Democratic | Anna Wishart | 9,930 | 74.93% |
| Nonpartisan | Dick Clark | 3,657 | 25.07% |
| Total votes | | 14,587 | 100.0% |
| Democratic gain from Republican | | | |

=== District 29 ===
District 29 election, 2016
| Party | Candidate | Votes | % |
|---|---|---|---|
| Democratic | Kate Bolz (incumbent) | 14,281 | 82.95% |
| Nonpartisan | Melody Vaccaro | 2,936 | 17.05% |
| Total votes | | 17,217 | 100.0% |
| Democratic hold | | | |

=== District 31 ===
District 31 election, 2016
| Party | Candidate | Votes | % |
|---|---|---|---|
| Democratic | Rick Kolowski (incumbent) | 9,762 | 52.07% |
| Nonpartisan | Ian Swanson | 8,985 | 47.93% |
| Total votes | | 18,747 | 100.0% |
| Democratic hold | | | |

=== District 33 ===
District 33 election, 2016
| Party | Candidate | Votes | % |
|---|---|---|---|
| Republican | Steve Halloran | 9,164 | 60.22% |
| Republican | Les Seiler (incumbent) | 6,053 | 39.78% |
| Total votes | | 15,217 | 100.0% |
| Republican hold | | | |

=== District 35 ===
District 35 election, 2016
| Party | Candidate | Votes | % |
|---|---|---|---|
| Democratic | Dan Quick | 5,743 | 50.33% |
| Nonpartisan | Gregg Neuhaus | 5,668 | 49.67% |
| Total votes | | 11,411 | 100.0% |
| Democratic gain from Republican | | | |

=== District 37 ===
District 37 election, 2016
| Party | Candidate | Votes | % |
|---|---|---|---|
| Republican | John Lowe | 8,600 | 53.26% |
| Nonpartisan | Bob Lammers | 7,547 | 46.74% |
| Total votes | | 16,147 | 100.0% |
| Republican hold | | | |

=== District 39 ===
District 39 election, 2016
| Party | Candidate | Votes | % |
|---|---|---|---|
| Republican | Lou Ann Linehan | 11,729 | 54.87% |
| Nonpartisan | Bill Armbrust | 9,646 | 45.13% |
| Total votes | | 21,375 | 100.0% |
| Republican hold | | | |

=== District 41 ===
District 41 election, 2016
| Party | Candidate | Votes | % |
|---|---|---|---|
| Republican | Tom Briese | 14,080 | 100.0% |
| Total votes | | 14,080 | 100.0% |
| Republican gain from Democratic | | | |

=== District 43 ===
District 43 election, 2016
| Party | Candidate | Votes | % |
|---|---|---|---|
| Republican | Tom Brewer | 9,169 | 52.26% |
| Republican | Al Davis (incumbent) | 8,376 | 47.74% |
| Total votes | | 17,545 | 100.0% |
| Republican hold | | | |

=== District 45 ===
District 45 election, 2016
| Party | Candidate | Votes | % |
|---|---|---|---|
| Democratic | Sue Crawford (incumbent) | 8,774 | 56.58% |
| Nonpartisan | Michael Cook | 6,734 | 43.42% |
| Total votes | | 15,508 | 100.0% |
| Democratic hold | | | |

=== District 47 ===
District 47 election, 2016
| Party | Candidate | Votes | % |
|---|---|---|---|
| Republican | Steve Erdman | 10,739 | 67.25% |
| Nonpartisan | Karl Elmshaeuser | 5,230 | 32.75% |
| Total votes | | 15,969 | 100.0% |
| Republican hold | | | |

=== District 49 ===
District 49 election, 2016
| Party | Candidate | Votes | % |
|---|---|---|---|
| Republican | John Murante (incumbent) | 15,137 | 100.0% |
| Total votes | | 15,137 | 100.0% |
| Republican hold | | | |
