= Nebraska Legislature 33rd district =

American legislative district

Nebraska's 33rd legislative district
- Map of Nebraska Legislature districts with the 33rd district shaded in red
Senator
Dan Lonowski; R–Hastings
since 2025
- Demographics: 87% White; 0.6% Black; 10.3% Hispanic; 1.1% Asian; 0.5% Native American
- Population (2020): 40,614

The Nebraska Legislature's 33rd district is one of the 49 legislative districts in the Nebraska Legislature. The district is located in south-central Nebraska and covers Adams, Kearney, and part of Phelps counties. Notable settlements in the area include Hastings, Minden, Axtell, Bertrand, and Kenesaw. Dan Lonowski has represented the district since 2025.

== Demographics ==
The US Census Bureau recorded the population as of 2020 at 40,614.

- 87% of the district is White.
- 10.3% of the district is Hispanic.
- 1.1% of the district is Asian.
- 0.6% of the district is Black.
- 0.5% of the district is Native American.

== List of senators ==
Senator	Party	Years of service	Legislature	Residence
Dan Lonowski	Republican	2025 - present	109th	Hastings
Steve Halloran	Republican	2017-2025	105th-108th	Hastings
Les Seiler	Republican	2012-2017	102nd-104th	Hastings
Dennis Utter	Republican	2009-2011*	101st-102nd	Hastings
Carroll Burling	Republican	2001-2009	97th-100th	Kenesaw
Ardyce Bohlke	Democratic	1991-2001	92nd-96th	Hastings
Jacklyn Smith	Republican	1985-1991*	89th-91st	Hastings
Clarence Jacobson	Republican	1982-1985	87th-88th	Hastings
Richard Marvel	Republican	1965-1982*	75th-87th	Hastings

- Les Seiler was appointed by Gov. Dave Heineman following the death of Dennis Utter in December 2011.
- Jacklyn Smith resigned before her term ended. Ardyce Bohlke was appointed to fill the vacancy by Gov. Ben Nelson.
- Richard Marvel resigned before his term ended. Clarence Jacobson was appointed to fill the vacancy by Gov.
