= Senator Burling =

Senator Burling may refer to:

- Albert E. Burling (1891–1960), New Jersey State Senate
- Carroll Burling (born 1934), Nebraska State Senate
- George T. Burling (1849–1928), New York State Senate
- Peter Burling (politician) (born 1945), New Hampshire State Senate
