= Senator Utter =

Senator Utter may refer to:

- Dennis Utter (1939–2011), Nebraska State Senate
- George H. Utter (1854–1912), Rhode Island State Senate
