= Senator Fox =

Senator Fox may refer to:

- Andrew F. Fox (1849–1926), Mississippi State Senate
- Chauncey J. Fox (1797–1883), New York State Senate
- Fred L. Fox (1876–1952), West Virginia State Senate
- James Augustus Fox (1827–1901), Massachusetts State Senate
- John Fox (congressman) (1835–1914), New York State Senate
- Mike Fox (politician) (fl. 2020s), Montana State Senate
- Nicole Fox (Nebraska politician) (born 1974), Nebraska State Senate
- Roberta Fox (1943–2009), Florida State Senate
- Sally Fox (politician) (1951–2014), Vermont State Senate

== See also ==
- Virginia Foxx (born 1943), North Carolina State Senate
- Le Sénateur Fox (Senator Fox), a 2004 French film for which actress Catherine Rich was nominated for a Molière Award for Best Actress
