= Senator Brewer =

Senator Brewer may refer to:

- Earl L. Brewer (1869–1942), Mississippi State Senate
- Jan Brewer (born 1944), Arizona State Senate
- Mark S. Brewer (1837–1901), Michigan State Senate
- Stephen Brewer (born 1948), Massachusetts State Senate
- Tom Brewer (born 1958), Nebraska State Legislature
