= Jacklyn Smith =

American politician (1934–2021)

Member of the Nebraska Legislature
- In office January 9, 1985 – July 1, 1991
- Preceded by: Clarence Jacobson
- Succeeded by: Ardyce Bohlke

Personal details
- Born: November 12, 1934 Campbell, Nebraska
- Died: June 20, 2021 (aged 86) Bellevue, Nebraska
- Party: Republican
- Spouse: Ramon G. Smith (m. 1952)
- Children: 4 (Robb, Jeff, Kurt, Jon)
- Education: Kearney State College (B.A.); University of Nebraska–Lincoln
- Occupation: Business consultant, instructor, public policy administrator

Jacklyn J. Smith (née Brunke, November 12, 1934 – June 20, 2021) was a Republican politician from Nebraska who served as a member of the Nebraska Legislature from 1985 to 1991.

== Early life ==
Jacklyn Brunke was born in Campbell, Nebraska, in 1934. She married Ramon Smith in 1952, and graduated with her bachelor's degree from Kearney State College. Smith completed one year of graduate school at the University of Nebraska–Lincoln. She worked as the assistant director of the Midland Area Agency on Aging.

== Nebraska Legislature ==
In 1984, Smith ran against appointed State Senator Clarence Jacobson in the 33rd district, which was based in Adams County. In the nonpartisan primary, Smith placed first, winning 31 percent of the vote, while businessman Jack Crowley placed second with 29 percent, farmer Lloyd Bohlke placed third with 24 percent, and Jacobson placed fourth with 15 percent. Smith defeated Crowley, winning 56 percent of the vote to Crowley's 44 percent.

Smith ran for a second term in 1988, and no candidates filed to run against her, and she won the election unopposed.

== Post-legislative career ==
Smith stepped down from the legislature after she was appointed by Governor Ben Nelson to serve as the director of the Nebraska Department of Aging. She resigned on July 1, 1991.

Smith was later appointed the administrator of the Community Options for the Elderly Programs and served as the town librarian of the Campbell library.

== Death ==
Smith died on June 20, 2021.
