= Zbroyar Z-008 =

Sniper rifle

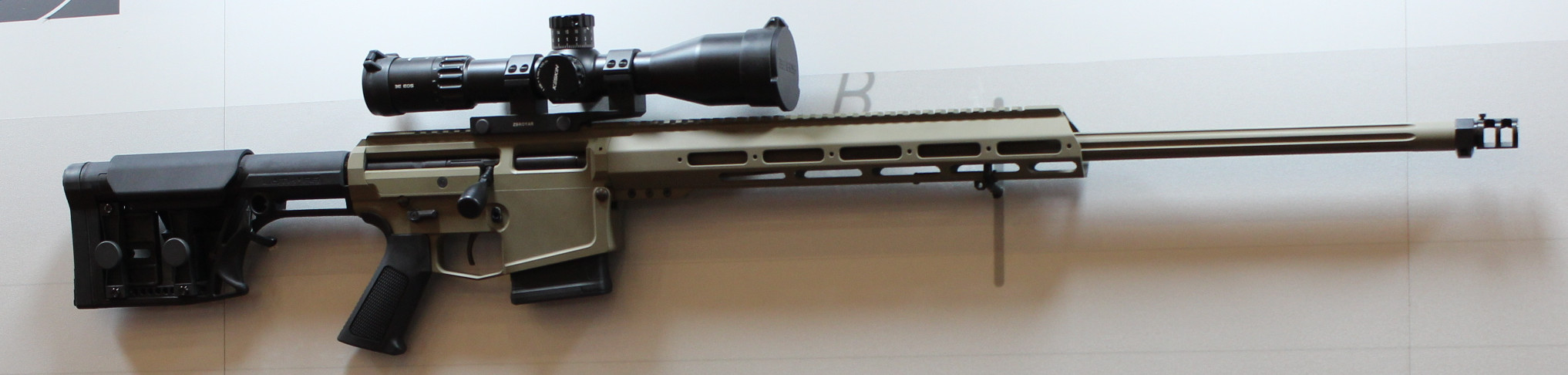
- Type: Sniper rifle
- Place of origin: Ukraine

Production history
- Designer: Konstantin Konev
- Manufacturer: Zbroyar
- Produced: 2007-

Specifications
- Mass: 6–6.5 kg (13–14 lb)

The Zbroyar Z-008 is a series of sniper rifles designed by Konstantin Konev and manufactured by Zbroyar.

== Design ==
The basic models of the Z-008 series are Tactical, Tactical Pro, Hunting, Hunting Pro, Varmint, and Benchrest. Almost every rifle produced by the company is made to order, with the design changes required by the customer.
