= Zbroyar =

Ukrainian weapons manufacturer

- Company type: Privately held company
- Industry: Defense
- Founded: 2007; 19 years ago
- Headquarters: Kyiv, Ukraine
- Products: Firearms, weapons

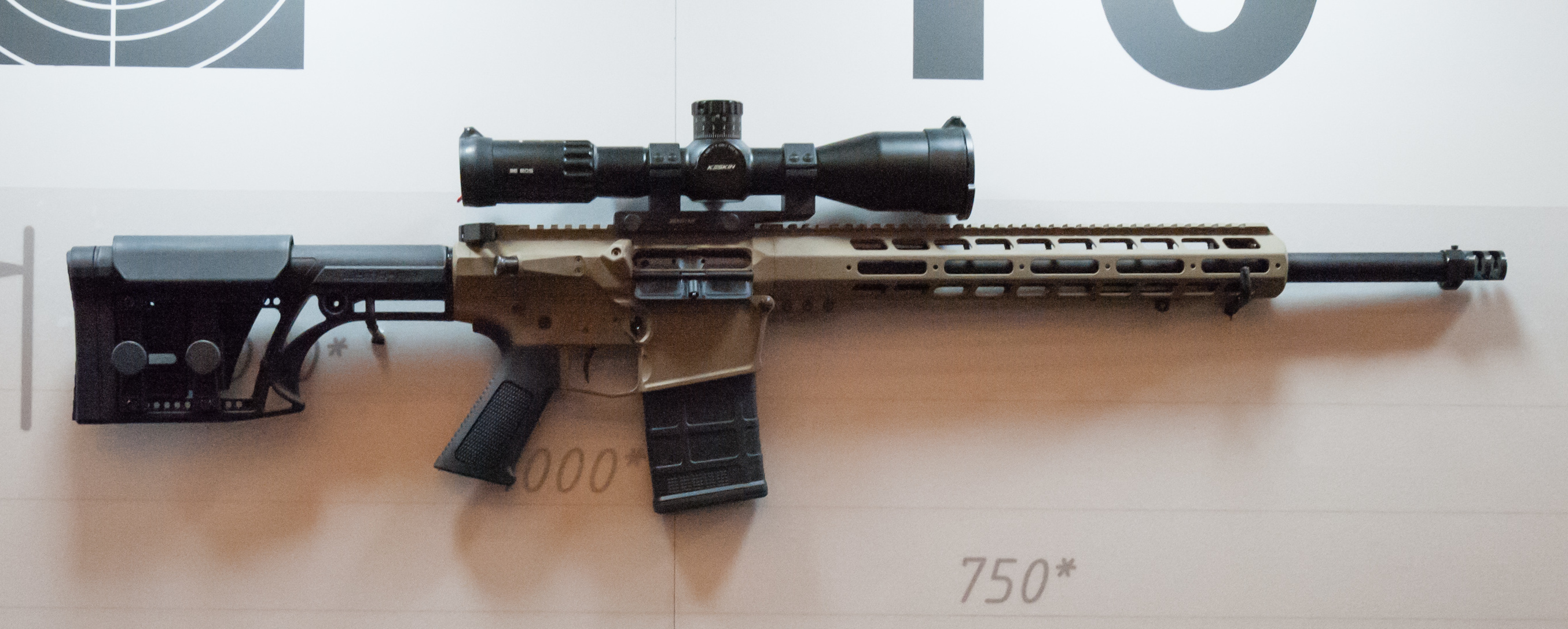
Zbroyar Z-10 rifle

Zbroyar (Ukrainian: Зброяр) is a privately owned Ukrainian weapons manufacturer that specializes in the production of high-precision sports and hunting rifles.

Zbroyar became more prominent with the appearance in the range of its Z-10 and Z-15 self-loading rifles

== History ==
Zbroyar was founded in 2007 as a specialized small-scale production of high-precision sports and hunting rifles. The company became famous thanks to its Z-008 sniper rifle, on the basis of which military models were developed, which in some respects surpassed more expensive foreign counterparts.

The company started its business with a small fleet of machines on leased areas of the Kyiv Radio Plant. In 2013, the production was reorganized and technically modernized. As a result, specialists with experience in the defense and aerospace industries joined, and their employees increased to more than 80 people.

== Recognition ==
The Ukrainian Z-008 rifle team won second place at the European F-Class Championships in 2011 and 2012.
