= Zbroyar Z-10 =

Sniper rifle

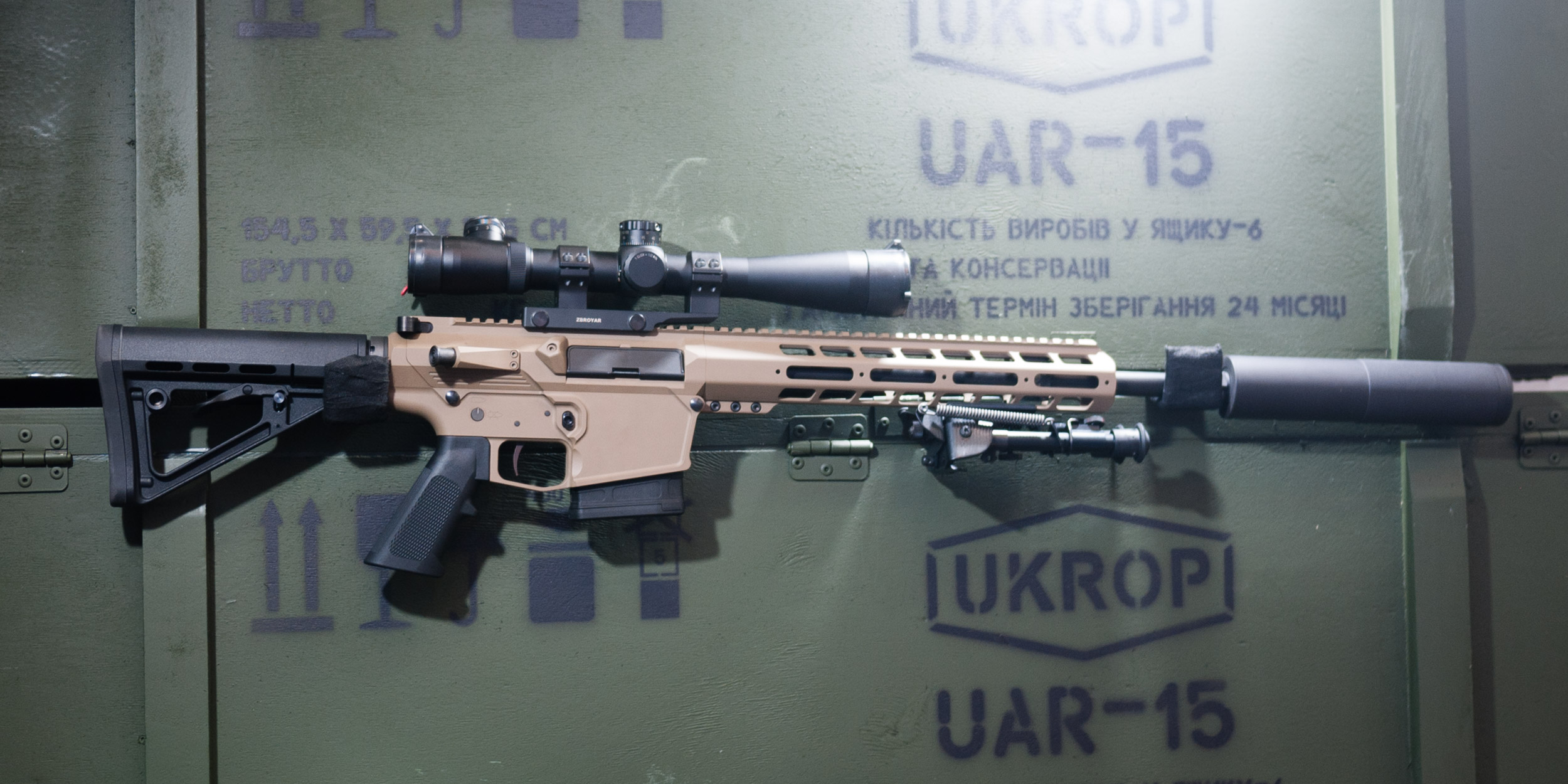
- Scoped/suppressed Z-10 at the 'Zbroya ta Bezpeka' military fair, Kyiv, Ukraine in 2021.
- Type: Sniper rifle
- Place of origin: Ukraine

Service history
- In service: 2012–present
- Used by: See Users
- Wars: Russo-Ukrainian war

Production history
- Designer: variant of ArmaLite AR-10
- Designed: ~2012
- Manufacturer: Zbroyar
- Produced: 2012–present

Specifications
- Mass: 5.5 kg (12 lb)
- Length: 1,140 mm (3 ft 9 in)
- Barrel length: 610 mm (24 in)
- Cartridge: 7.62×51mm NATO
- Effective firing range: 800 m (870 yd)
- Feed system: 10-round detachable box magazine

The Zbroyar Z-10 (Ukrainian: Зброяр Z-10), also known as the UAR-10, is a 7.62×51mm NATO sniper rifle manufactured by Zbroyar and is based on the ArmaLite AR-10.

== History ==
The first Z-10 rifles were manufactured in May 2012.

By the beginning of the spring of 2014, the company was fully self-sufficient in receivers, bolt frames and gas systems, but the barrels for the produced weapons were imported, they were mainly purchased in the US and Spain. In connection with the devaluation of the hryvnia in 2014–2015, trunks were bought in small batches. After the outbreak of the War in Donbas in Spring 2014, Zbroyar stepped up cooperation with the leadership of the state power structures of Ukraine to participate in military orders.

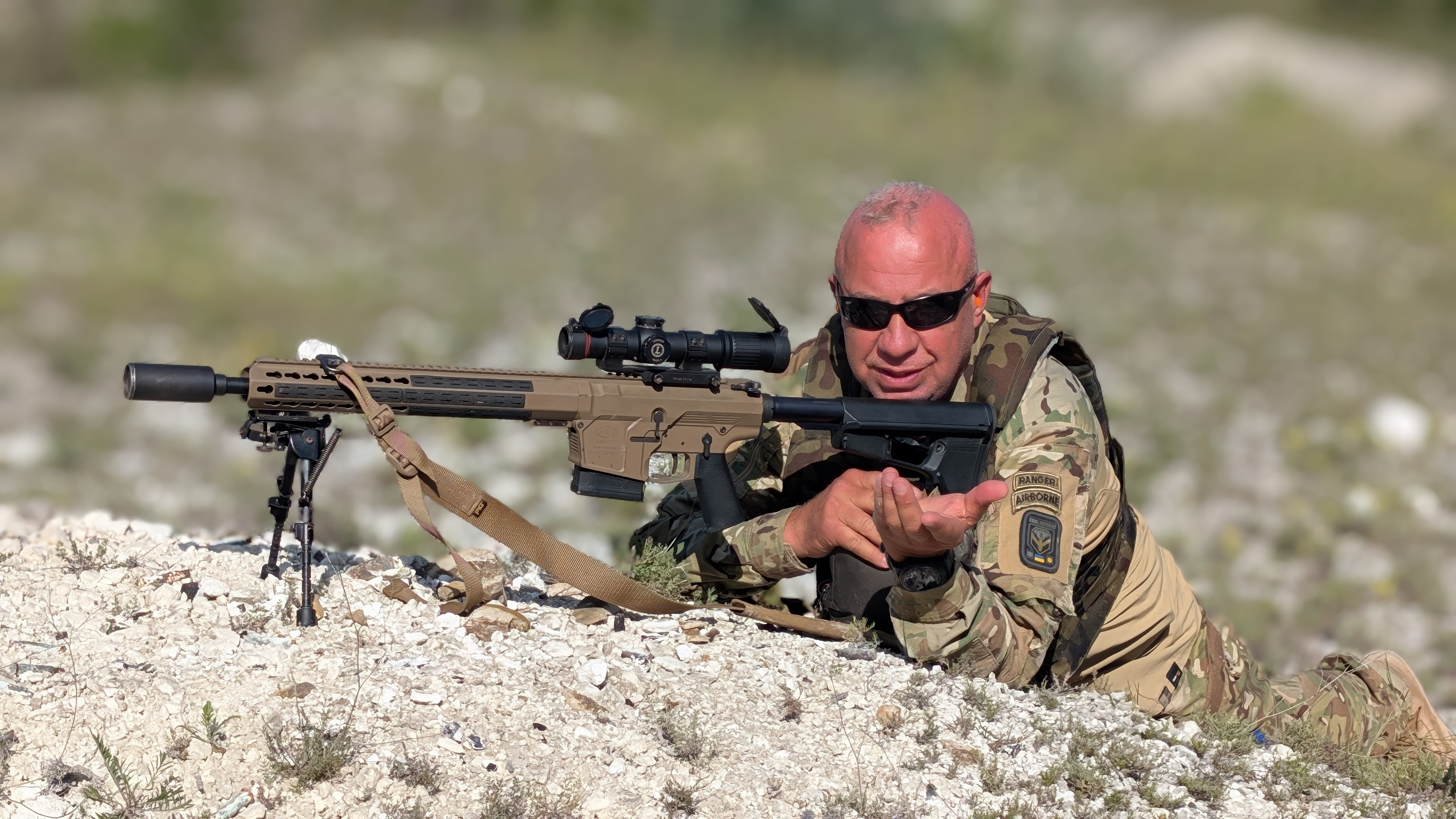
Tom Brewer prepares to fire a UAR-10 rifle in the Donbas during a training exercise with the 117th Territorial Defense Brigade in June 2026.

In October 2015, photographs were published of the use by servicemen of the 79th Air Assault Brigade of two Z-10 rifles equipped with optical sights, bipods, Luth-AR butts and Ergogrip handles.

In August 2017, the use of the Z-10 rifle by the military personnel of the armed forces of Ukraine during the fighting in the Donbas was mentioned. Later, it became known that 82 Z-10 rifles were purchased and transferred to the troops at his own expense by Petro Poroshenko. On 25 August, the General Director of Zbroyar LLC S. Gorban, said in an interview that the company had mastered the mass production of the Z-10 rifle and was capable of independently producing 85% of its components. On 1 September, Gorban said in an interview that the company has mastered the independent production of 87% of the Z-10 components, but blanks for the manufacture of barrels and some other components are imported. He also said that the company is offering the Z-10 rifle as a replacement for the Soviet-made SVD sniper rifles in service with Ukrainian law enforcement agencies and has already handed over two rifles to the Ministry of Defence for testing. In addition, the rifles were bought and used during the hostilities in the Donbas by military personnel, border guards, and employees of the Security Service.

In 2018, a version of the Z-10 rifle chambered for 7.62 × 51 mm was adopted for armament by the Armed Forces of Ukraine under the name 7.62-mm self-loading sniper rifle UAR-10. On 8 November 2019, Colonel Vladislav Shostak, a representative of the Department of Military-Technical Policy, Development of Weapons and Military Equipment of the Ministry of Defense of Ukraine, said that in 2019 the troops received about 600 UAR-10 and UAR-008 sniper rifles.

== Users ==
=== Current ===
- Ukraine:
  - Armed Forces of Ukraine
  - National Guard of Ukraine
  - Foreign Intelligence Service of Ukraine

=== Former ===
- Russian separatist forces in Ukraine
