= Jeremy Nordquist =

American politician

Member of the Nebraska Legislature from the 7th district
- In office 2009–2015
- Preceded by: John Synowiecki
- Succeeded by: Nicole Fox

Personal details
- Born: November 10, 1981 (age 44) Sioux Falls, South Dakota
- Party: Democrat 2009-2022, Non-Partisan 2024-present

Jeremiah J. Nordquist (born November 10, 1981) is a politician from the state of Nebraska in the Midwestern United States. Nordquist represented an Omaha district in the Nebraska Legislature from 2009 to 2015. He served in the Unicameral as a member of the Democratic Party, but is now a registered Non-Partisan.

== Early life and career ==
Nordquist was born November 10, 1981, in Sioux Falls, South Dakota. In 2000, he graduated from high school in Beresford, South Dakota. He attended Creighton University in Omaha, graduating in 2004 with a B.A. in political science. In 2006, he married Shannon C. Riley; the couple has two children.

From 2004 to 2008, Nordquist worked for the Nebraska Legislature, as research analyst and an aide to senator John Synowiecki. From 2008 to 2013, he was employed as an advisor by Building Bright Futures, an Omaha philanthropy that sought to improve academic performance by low-income Omaha children.

== Nebraska legislature ==
In 2008, Nordquist ran for the Nebraska Legislature from District 7, representing downtown and southern Omaha. The incumbent, Synowiecki, was ineligible to run for a third consecutive term under Nebraska's term-limits law. Nordquist, a member of the Democratic Party, was opposed by Christopher Moles, a Republican law clerk who was then working on a Juris Doctor degree and a master's degree in business administration at Creighton University.

In the nonpartisan primary, Nordquist received 1230 of the 1835 votes cast, or 67%. Moles received 605 votes, or 33%. As the top two vote-getters in the primary, both candidates moved on to the November general election. Nordquist won this election with 4961 of the 6726 votes cast, or 73.8%; Moles received 1765 votes, or 26.2%.

In 2012, Nordquist sought re-election to the Legislature. He faced two challengers. Christopher Geary, a Republican business owner, had unsuccessfully run for the Nebraska governorship in 2010; he had placed third in a three-way Republican primary, losing to incumbent governor Dave Heineman with 4.8% of the vote to Heineman's 89.9%. Adrian Petrescu, a professor of public policy at the University of Nebraska Omaha, was making his first bid for elective office.

In the primary election, Nordquist received 1406 of the 1934 votes cast, or 72.7%. Geary placed second, with 345 votes, or 17.8%; Petrescu received 183 votes, or 9.5%. As the top two vote-getters, Nordquist and Geary moved on to the general election. Nordquist won re-election with 4211 of the 6003 votes cast, or 70.1%; Geary received 1792 votes, or 29.9%.

During his tenure in the Legislature, Nordquist served as chair of the Retirement Systems Committee; he also sat on the Appropriations Committee. In 2014, he co-chaired an initiative petition drive that sought to raise the state's minimum wage to $9 per hour; the measure passed in the general election.

In 2015, Nordquist resigned from the Legislature in order to become chief of staff for Brad Ashford, who had been elected to represent Nebraska's 2nd District in the U.S. House of Representatives. Republican governor Pete Ricketts appointed Nicole Fox, a Republican, to serve the remainder of the term.

== Policies ==
=== Deferred Action for Childhood Arrivals ===
Nordquist was the lead co-sponsor of a bill which would allow DACA recipients (also known as "Dreamers") to receive driver's licenses. DACA recipients are children who were brought to the United States illegally as children but grew up in the United States, and were granted temporary protection from deportation under a program initially introduced by then-President Barack Obama. The state's governor Pete Ricketts initially vetoed this measure but the legislature voted 34–10 to override the veto. This ended Nebraska's status as the only state to deny driver's licenses to DACA recipients. The bill was Legislative Bill (LB) 623.

=== State minimum wage ===
Nordquist led a successful initiative to increase the state minimum wage to $9 per hour by 2016. 135,000 Nebraskans signed a petition to put the initiative on the ballot in 2014, which was voted on in the November 2014 election. He also attempted unsuccessfully to persuade the legislature to raise the minimum wage for tipped workers.

=== LGBT rights ===
In 2013 and 2015, Nordquist sponsored multiple bills to protect or expand LGBT rights while serving in the legislature. One bill would prevent discrimination in employment and housing by adding sexual and gender identity to the classes protected from discrimination in employment, housing, and public accommodation. Another pair of bills would allow same-sex couples to adopt children or become foster parents, overturning a 20-year old policy which only permitted married heterosexual couples to adopt or serve as foster parents. Each time, the bills were eventually tabled due to stiff opposition from the religious lobby.
