= Lynne Walz =

American politician (born 1963)

Member of the Nebraska Legislature from the 15th district
- In office January 4, 2017 – January 8, 2025
- Preceded by: David Schnoor
- Succeeded by: Dave Wordekemper

Personal details
- Born: Lynne Marie Shallberg; June 18, 1963 (age 63) Fremont, Nebraska, U.S.
- Party: Democratic
- Spouse: Christopher Walz (m. 1986)
- Relations: Tim Walz (cousin by marriage)
- Children: 3
- Education: Midland University (BA)
- Website: Campaign website

Lynne Marie Walz (née Shallberg; born June 18, 1963) is an American politician, former teacher, and realtor, who served in the Nebraska Legislature from 2017 to 2025. A member of the Democratic Party, she represented District 15, which includes Fremont and surrounding areas.

In November 2025, Walz formed an exploratory committee to explore running for governor in 2026. She won the Democratic nomination in the May 2026 primary election.

== Early life and education ==
Walz was born in Fremont, Nebraska and graduated from Arlington High School in 1981. She then went on to Midland Lutheran College to earn a B.A. in elementary education in 1994. She married her husband in 1986 and now has 3 children and 4 grandchildren. She is a distant cousin by marriage of Minnesota governor and 2024 Democratic nominee for vice president Tim Walz.

Walz is a former teacher and worked for Fremont Public Schools and Archbishop Bergan High School. She is a current realtor at Don Peterson and Associates. Before entering the state legislature, Walz was on the Fremont Bergan School Board and served as the president of Fremont Board of Realtors.

== Political career ==
=== Election results ===
Walz was first elected to the state legislature in 2016, defeating incumbent David Schnoor with 51% of the vote. She was chosen as the running mate (Lieutenant Governor) of fellow State Senator Bob Krist in his 2018 campaign for Governor. The Krist-Walz ticket lost the election receiving 41% of votes. Walz won reelection on November 3, 2020, against David Rogers with 59.6% of the votes. Walz was term limited in 2025.

=== Committees ===
At the beginning of the 2017 Legislative Session, Walz sat on the Education and Natural Resources Committees. From 2019 until 2025, she sat on both the Health and Human Services and Education Committee.

In 2021, she ran for Education Chair and won against incumbent Senator Mike Groene. Chairs are elected through a secret ballot and the final vote was 25–23. The secret ballot initiative has led to several Senators attempting rule changes every year.

Party political offices
Preceded by Jane Raybould	Democratic nominee for Lieutenant Governor of Nebraska; 2018	Succeeded by Al Davis
Preceded by Carol Blood	Democratic nominee for Governor of Nebraska; 2026	Most recent
