= Clarence Jacobson =

American politician (1912–1990)

Member of the Nebraska Legislature from the 33rd district
- In office November 29, 1982 – January 9, 1985
- Preceded by: Richard Marvel
- Succeeded by: Jacklyn Smith

Personal details
- Born: October 16, 1912 Lexington, Nebraska
- Died: January 17, 1990 (aged 77) Omaha, Nebraska
- Party: Republican
- Spouse: Dorothy A. Archer (m. 1947)
- Children: 2 (Jonnell, James)
- Education: University of Nebraska
- Occupation: Grain merchant

Clarence Jacobson (October 16, 1912 – January 17, 1990) was a Republican politician and grain trader from Nebraska who served as a member of the Nebraska Legislature from the 33rd district from 1982 to 1985.

== Early career ==
Jacobson was born in Lexington, Nebraska, in 1912, the son of State Senator John Jacobson, and attended the University of Nebraska. He served in the U.S. Army during World War II and the Korean War, and upon returning to Nebraska, worked as a grains trader. Jacobson was the president of a mill and elevator company based in Lexington until 1963, when he moved to Hastings to work at a different elevator company, and in 1972, he began working as a commodities broker until his retirement in 1977. He served as a charter member of the Nebraska Equal Opportunity Commission when it was created in 1965.

== Nebraska Legislature ==
In 1982, State Senate Speaker Richard Marvel resigned from the legislature, and outgoing Governor Charles Thone appointed Jacobson to serve out the remaining two years of Marvel's term. Jacobson was sworn in on November 29, 1982.

Jacobson ran for a full term in 1984. He was challenged by Jacklyn Smith, the assistant director of the Midland Area Agency on Aging; businessman Jack Crowley; Francis Kuhlman, a Central Community College; and farmer Lloyd Bohlke. Jacobson placed fourth in the primary, receiving 15 percent of the vote to Smith's 31 percent, Crowley's 29 percent, and Bohlke's 24 percent.

== Death ==
Jacobson died on January 17, 1990.
