= Tony Vargas =

American educator and politician (born 1984)

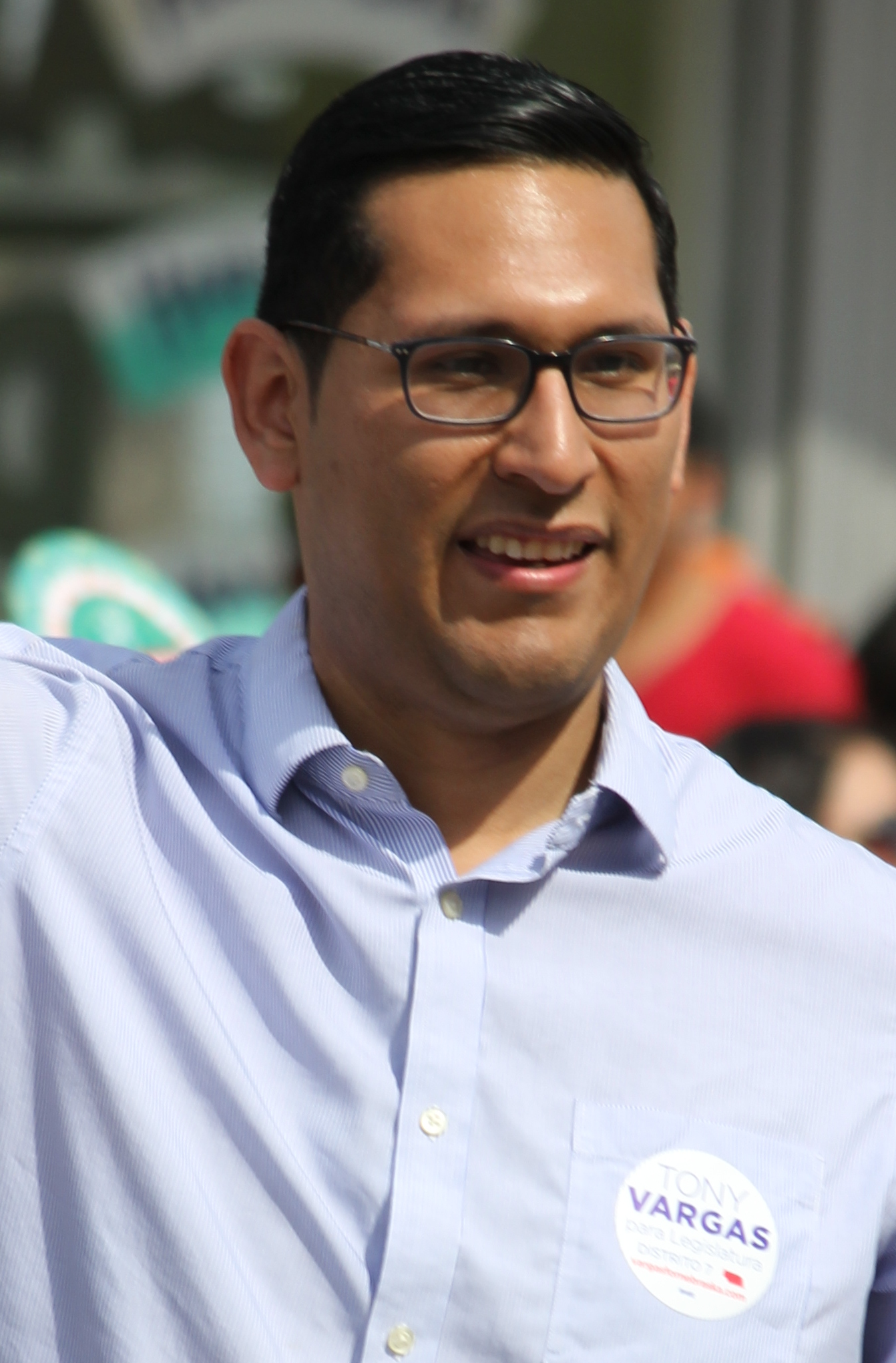
- Vargas in 2016

Vice Chair of the Executive Board of the Nebraska Legislature
- In office January 9, 2019 – January 4, 2023
- Preceded by: John Kuehn
- Succeeded by: Ray Aguilar

Member of the Nebraska Legislature from the 7th district
- In office January 4, 2017 – January 8, 2025
- Preceded by: Nicole Fox
- Succeeded by: Dunixi Guereca

Personal details
- Born: Anthony Vargas; September 2, 1984 (age 42) New York City, U.S.
- Party: Democratic
- Spouse: Lauren Micek (m. 2016)
- Children: 2
- Education: University of Rochester (BA); Pace University (MS)
- Website: Campaign website

Anthony Vargas (born September 2, 1984) is an American politician and former educator who served as a member of the Nebraska Legislature from 2017 to 2025. Vargas represented the 7th district, which covers all of downtown Omaha and much of southeastern Omaha.

Vargas ran for Congress in Nebraska's 2nd congressional district in both 2022 and 2024, losing closely both times to incumbent Republican Don Bacon.

== Early life and education ==
Vargas was born to Antonio and Lidia Vargas in Queens, New York City, who were originally from Peru. He has two older brothers He was raised in Smithtown, NY and graduated from Smithtown High School in 2002. He is a graduate of the University of Rochester and received a Master of Science in education from Pace University.

== Career ==
Vargas is a former public school teacher. He also served as an AmeriCorps fellow through Teach for America. He was appointed to the Omaha Public Schools Board in 2013, following the resignation of a board member.

=== Nebraska Legislature ===
In 2016 he ran for the Legislature against incumbent senator Nicole Fox. Fox, a Republican, finished third in the nonpartisan primary, which saw Vargas and former senator John Synowiecki advance to the general election. Vargas defeated Synowiecki in the general election with nearly 62% of the vote. He was the first Hispanic Democrat elected to the Nebraska legislature.

==== Committees ====
Vargas has served on the Appropriations Committee. In 2021, Vargas was re-elected to the position of vice chair of the executive board. He is on the Legislature's Planning Committee.

==== COVID-19 pandemic ====
On July 29, 2020, Vargas attempted to suspend the Nebraska legislature's regular rules of order to introduce a bill that would enforce Centers for Disease Control and Prevention guidelines in meatpacking plants to respond to the COVID-19 pandemic. The motion failed to pass.

== U.S. House campaigns ==
=== 2022 ===
In July 2021, Vargas announced his candidacy for Nebraska's 2nd congressional district in the 2022 election. He won the Democratic primary on May 10, 2022, but lost the general election to Republican incumbent Don Bacon in November by 5,856 votes.

=== 2024 ===
In July 2023, Vargas announced his candidacy for Nebraska's 2nd congressional district in the 2024 election. In the general election he was again defeated by Bacon this time by 5,829 votes

== Political positions ==
In February 2024, Vargas introduced Legislative Bill 1355. The bill would provide $4 million a year from the Nebraska Opioid Recovery Fund to fund opioid treatment and overdose response programs.

In March 2024, Vargas and Senator Wendy DeBoer introduced two bills focused on housing affordability.

Vargas wants to codify abortion rights into federal law.

Vargas signed the U.S. Term Limits pledge.

== Personal life ==
Vargas is Catholic and resides in South Omaha, Nebraska, with his wife, Lauren, who is a special education teacher. They moved to Nebraska in 2012 after she was accepted into Creighton University School of Law. They have two children.

His father, Virgilio Antonio Vargas, died on April 29, 2020, from COVID-19 at the beginning of the global pandemic.

== Electoral history ==
=== 2016 ===
Nebraska Legislature District 7 Primary Election, 2016
Party	Candidate	Votes	%
Democratic	Tony Vargas	1,220	45.35
Nonpartisan	John Synowiecki	745	27.70
Republican	Nicole Fox (incumbent)	725	26.95
Total votes		2,690	100.00

Nebraska Legislature District 7 General Election, 2016
Party	Candidate	Votes	%
Democratic	Tony Vargas	5,244	61.75
Nonpartisan	John Synowiecki	3,248	38.25
Total votes		8,492	100.00

=== 2020 ===
Nebraska's 7th Legislative District Election, 2020
Primary election
Party	Candidate	Votes	%
Democratic	Tony Vargas (incumbent)	3,281	81.8
Republican	Jorge Sotolongo	731	18.1
Total votes			100.0
General election
Democratic	Tony Vargas (incumbent)	7,386	77.9
Republican	Jorge Sotolongo	2,098	22.1
Total votes			100.0
Democratic hold			

=== 2022 ===
Nebraska's 2nd congressional district, 2022
Party	Candidate	Votes	%
Republican	Don Bacon (incumbent)	112,663	51.3
Democratic	Tony Vargas	106,807	48.7
Total votes		219,470	100.0
Republican hold			

=== 2024 ===
Nebraska's 2nd congressional district, 2024
Party	Candidate	Votes	%
Republican	Don Bacon (incumbent)	160,198	50.9
Democratic	Tony Vargas	154,369	49.1
Total votes		314,567	100.0
Republican hold			

Nebraska Legislature
Preceded by John Kuehn	Vice Chair of the Executive Board of the Nebraska Legislature; 2019–2023	Succeeded by Ray Aguilar
