= David Schnoor =

American politician

Member of the Nebraska Legislature from the 15th district
- In office December 12, 2014 – January 4, 2017
- Preceded by: Charlie Janssen
- Succeeded by: Lynne Walz

Personal details
- Party: Republican
- Occupation: Farmer

David Schnoor is a politician from the state of Nebraska. In December 2014, he was appointed to the Nebraska Legislature, representing a district in the east-central part of the state. He was defeated by Lynne Walz in the 2016 election. He is a member of the Republican Party.

== Personal life and professional career ==
Schnoor was born on December 29, 1961, in West Point, Nebraska. He graduated from Scribner High School in Scribner, Nebraska, and immediately enlisted in the U.S. Air Force, in 1980. He earned two associate degrees from the Community College of the Air Force. He worked as a combat controller, and was awarded a Bronze Star with a "V" device for valor, for his actions during the rescue of a downed helicopter in Panama.

In 2000, Schnoor's father retired from the family farm near Scribner. Schnoor retired from the Air Force with the rank of master sergeant and, with his brother, took over the farm. He founded a cattle-feeding operation, Schnoor Feedyard. He was elected to the Scribner-Snyder School Board, and served as its president.

== Nebraska legislature ==
Scribner lay in the Nebraska Legislature's 15th District, which was coterminous with Dodge County, and included the city of Fremont. In 2014, Charlie Janssen, the district's legislator, successfully ran for the post of state auditor, and resigned from the Legislature with two years left in his term. Governor Dave Heineman, charged with appointing someone to fill the vacancy, chose Schnoor from a set of five applicants. Schnoor was sworn in on December 12, 2014.

=== 2015 session ===
In the 2015 session of the Legislature, Schnoor was appointed to the Education Committee and the Natural Resources Committee.

Among the "most significant" actions taken by the Legislature in its 2015 session were three bills that passed over vetoes by governor Pete Ricketts. LB268 repealed the state's death penalty; LB623 reversed the state's previous policy of denying driver's licenses to people who were living illegally in the United States after being brought to the country as children, and who had been granted exemption from deportation under the Barack Obama administration's Deferred Action for Childhood Arrivals (DACA) program; and LB610 increased the tax on gasoline to pay for repairs to roads and bridges. Schnoor voted against the death-penalty repeal, and to sustain Ricketts's veto of the measure; he voted against LB623, then to sustain the gubernatorial veto; and he abstained in both the vote on the gas-tax increase and the vote to override the veto.

=== 2016 session ===
In its 2016 session, the Nebraska legislature passed three bills that Ricketts then vetoed. LB580 would have created an independent commission of citizens to draw new district maps following censuses; supporters described it as an attempt to de-politicize the redistricting process, while Ricketts maintained that the bill delegated the legislature's constitutional duty of redistricting to "an unelected and unaccountable board". Schnoor was listed as "present and not voting" in the bill's 29–15–5 passage. Sponsor John Murante opted not to seek an override of the governor's veto.

A second vetoed bill, LB935, would have changed state audit procedures. The bill passed by a margin of 37–8–4; Schnoor was among those voting against it. The bill was withdrawn without an attempt to override the veto; the state auditor agreed to work with the governor on a new version for the next year's session.

A third bill passed over Ricketts's veto. LB947 made DACA beneficiaries eligible for commercial and professional licenses in Nebraska. The bill passed the Legislature on a vote of 33–11–5; the veto override passed 31–13–5. Schnoor was present and not voting at the bill's passage, and voted against the override of Ricketts's veto.

The legislature failed to pass LB10, greatly desired by the Republican Party, which would have restored Nebraska to a winner-take-all scheme of allocating its electoral votes in U.S. presidential elections, rather than continuing its practice of awarding the electoral vote for each congressional district to the candidate who received the most votes in that district. Supporters were unable to break a filibuster; in the 32–17 cloture motion, Schnoor was among those who voted in favor of the bill.
