= Carroll Burling =

American politician

Carroll Burling (born November 25, 1934, in Hastings, Nebraska) is a politician from the U.S. state of Nebraska. A farmer from Kenesaw, Burling served in the Nebraska Legislature, representing the 33rd legislative district from 2001 to 2009.

He graduated from Kenesaw Central High School in 1952. He became president of Burling Farms, and served on the board of directors of the Nebraska Farm Bureau.

In 2000, Burling ran for the 33rd-district seat, left open by incumbent Ardyce Bohlke's decision not to run for a third term. He defeated Hastings mayor Phil Odom, taking 63.4% of the vote to Odom's 36.5%.

In 2004, Burling ran for re-election against challenger Steve Scherr, a Hastings attorney. He won the election with 55.3% of the vote to Scherr's 44.7%.

In the legislature, Burling sat on the Agriculture, Business and Labor, Government, and Military and Veterans' Affairs committees.

Nebraska's term-limits law prevented Burling's running for a third consecutive term in 2008.

Preceded by Ardyce Bohlke	Nebraska state senator-district 33; 2001–2009	Succeeded by Dennis Utter
