= Al Davis (Nebraska politician) =

American politician (born 1952)

Member of the Nebraska Legislature from the 43rd district
- In office January 9, 2013 – January 4, 2017
- Preceded by: Deb Fischer
- Succeeded by: Tom Brewer

Personal details
- Born: July 28, 1952 (age 74) Hyannis, Nebraska, U.S.
- Party: Democratic (before 1990; 2022–present)
- Other political affiliations: Republican (1990–2022)
- Education: University of Denver (BA)

Albert T. Davis (born July 28, 1952) is an American businessman and politician who served as a member of the Nebraska Legislature from 2013 to 2017.

== Early life and education ==
Davis was born in Hyannis, Nebraska. As a high school student, Davis wrote and performed in plays. He attended Creighton University and the American Academy of Dramatic Arts before earning a Bachelor of Arts degree in history and economics from the University of Denver.

== Career ==
Prior to entering politics, Davis worked as a real estate developer and ranch-owner. In 2012, incumbent Senator Deb Fischer ran for the U.S. Senate, leaving her seat open. Davis placed second in the May 15, 2012 primary election, then defeated John Ravenscroft in the general election. In his 2016 re-election campaign, Davis was defeated by Tom Brewer.

Democrat Carol Blood, in her campaign for Governor of Nebraska, chose Al Davis to be her running mate for Lieutenant Governor; both were nominated by the Democratic Party for their respective offices in the May 10, 2022, primary election.

Nebraska Legislature
| Preceded by Deb Fischer | Member of the Nebraska Legislature from the 43rd district 2013–2017 | Succeeded by Tom Brewer |
Party political offices
| Preceded by Lynne Walz | Democratic nominee for Lieutenant Governor of Nebraska; 2022 | Most recent |
