= Nicole Fox (politician) =

American politician

Member of the Nebraska Legislature from the 7th district
- In office 2015–2017
- Preceded by: Jeremy Nordquist
- Succeeded by: Tony Vargas

Personal details
- Born: September 14, 1974 (age 51)
- Party: Republican
- Occupation: Dietitian

Nicole Fox (born September 14, 1974) is a politician from the state of Nebraska in the Midwestern United States. She is a member of the Republican Party. In 2015, she was appointed to fill a vacant seat in the Nebraska Legislature, representing a district in downtown and southern Omaha. In 2016, she sought election to the seat and came in third in the nonpartisan primary and thus failed to advance to the general election.

== Early life and career ==
Fox was born on September 14, 1974, in Des Moines, Iowa. She grew up in Hamburg, Iowa, graduating from Hamburg High School in 1992. She attended Iowa State University, from which she received a B.S. in food and human nutrition dietetics science in 1996. Following an internship in Kansas City, she moved to Omaha in 1999, and began working as a dietitian and nutrition therapist for Nebraska Medicine, a private nonprofit organization operating two hospitals and a number of clinics in the Omaha metropolitan area.

== Nebraska legislature ==
In mid-2015, Jeremy Nordquist resigned his seat in the Nebraska legislature in order to take a job as chief of staff for Brad Ashford, who had recently been elected to the U.S. House of Representatives. Nordquist had represented the 7th Legislative District, consisting of parts of downtown Omaha and the South Omaha district. It fell to governor Pete Ricketts to name a replacement to serve the remainder of Nordquist's term. Ricketts chose Fox, who had been active in Omaha Republican politics, from a list of eight applicants for the position.

=== 2016 session ===
In the 2016 legislative session, Fox was assigned to the Banking, Commerce and Insurance Committee, and to the Health and Human Services Committee.

In the 2016 session, the legislature passed three bills that Ricketts then vetoed. LB580 would have created an independent commission of citizens to draw new district maps following censuses; supporters described it as an attempt to de-politicize the redistricting process, while Ricketts maintained that the bill delegated the legislature's constitutional duty of redistricting to "an unelected and unaccountable board". Fox voted against the bill in its 29–15 passage. Sponsor John Murante opted not to seek an override of the governor's veto.

A second vetoed bill, LB935, would have changed state audit procedures. The bill passed by a margin of 37–8, with 4 present and not voting; Fox was among those voting for it. The bill was withdrawn without an attempt to override the veto; the state auditor agreed to work with the governor on a new version for the next year's session.

A third bill passed over Ricketts's veto. LB947 made DACA beneficiaries eligible for commercial and professional licenses in Nebraska. The bill passed the Legislature on a vote of 33–11–5; the veto override passed 31–13–5. Fox voted against the bill at its initial passage, and in favor of sustaining Ricketts's veto.

The legislature failed to pass LB10, greatly desired by the Republican Party, which would have restored Nebraska to a winner-take-all scheme of allocating its electoral votes in U.S. presidential elections, rather than continuing its practice of awarding the electoral vote for each congressional district to the candidate who received the most votes in that district. Supporters were unable to break a filibuster; in the 32–17 cloture motion, Fox was among those who voted for the bill.

=== 2016 election ===
In 2016, Fox ran for election to the seat. She faced two opponents, both members of the Democratic Party. Both of these opponents had applied to fill the vacancy created by Nordquist's resignation. John Synowiecki, the director of resource development for Catholic Charities of Omaha, had previously represented the district in the legislature; he had been appointed to the seat in 2002 by governor Mike Johanns and had won re-election in 2004; in 2008, he had been barred by Nebraska's term-limits law from running for a third consecutive term. Tony Vargas, a 31-year-old education consultant, had held a seat on the Omaha Public Schools board since 2013.

Fox stated that her principal concern was high taxes. She expressed support for voter identification laws; Synowiecki and Vargas both opposed them. Fox opposed the proposed expansion of Medicaid in Nebraska under the terms of the 2010 Affordable Care Act; Synowiecki and Vargas both supported it. Before the veto-override vote on LB947, which Fox had opposed, both Synowiecki and Vargas stated that they supported the measure.

In the course of the primary campaign, Fox received about $32,000 in contributions, and spent about $19,000. Synowiecki's receipts amounted to about $21,000; his expenditures, to about $17,500. Vargas received about $21,000 and spent about $19,500. Major contributors to Fox's campaign included Ricketts, who gave her $5,000, and Omaha mayor Jean Stothert, who contributed $1,000; the Washington-based Academy of Nutrition and Dietetics PAC gave her campaign $5,000; and the Nebraska Bankers State PAC $1,500. Synowiecki's major contributors included Omaha-based Firefighters for Better Government, contributing $5,000; the Associated General Contractors PAC, which gave $2,500; the Nebraska Chamber of Commerce and Industry, contributing $1,000; and the Nebraska State Educational Association, providing $1,000. Vargas's single largest contributor was Leadership for Educational Equity, which provided $3,750; the group describes itself as "a nonpartisan, nonprofit organization dedicated to empowering Teach For America corps members and alumni to grow as leaders in their communities and help build the movement for educational equity". Vargas also received $2,000 from the Carpenters Interior Systems Union local.

When the nonpartisan primary was held, Vargas led with 1220 votes, or 45.4% of the total. Synowiecki placed second, with 745 votes, or 27.7%; Fox came in third, with 725 votes, or 27.0%. As the top two vote-getters, Vargas and Synowiecki were to move on to the general election; Fox was eliminated from the running. In the general election, Vargas won the seat, with 61.8% of the vote to Synowiecki's 38.2%.
