= Les Seiler =

American politician

Member of the Nebraska Legislature from the 33rd district
- In office 2012–2017
- Preceded by: Dennis Utter
- Succeeded by: Steve Halloran

Personal details
- Born: March 10, 1941 (age 85)
- Party: Republican
- Education: Wayne State College, University of Nebraska
- Occupation: lawyer

Les Seiler (born March 10, 1941) is a politician from the U.S. state of Nebraska. A resident of Hastings, Seiler represented the 33rd District in the Nebraska Legislature.

Seiler was born on March 10, 1941, in Red Cloud, Nebraska. He attended Wayne State College, earning a B.A. in 1960. He received his J.D. from the University of Nebraska College of Law in 1966. In 1966–67, he worked as a Nebraska assistant attorney general and in 1968-69 he worked as the assistant general counsel for the Metropolitan Utilities District. As of 2012, he worked as a lawyer at Seiler & Parker, P.C., in Hastings, Nebraska.

Seiler's 33rd District includes Adams County and portions of Hall County. Following the death of senator Dennis Utter in December 2011 governor Dave Heineman appointed Seiler to fill the vacancy. He was sworn in on January 14, 2012, following the second week of the 2012 legislative session. Seiler was a member of the Education Committee and the Government, Military and Veterans Affairs Committee.
