= John Synowiecki =

American politician (born 1963)

John Synowiecki (born November 28, 1963) is an American politician who is a former member of the Nebraska Legislature. He was also a program director for governmental relations for Catholic Charities.

== Personal life ==
He was born on November 28, 1963, in Omaha, Nebraska and graduated from Paul VI High School, a Roman Catholic high school, in 1982. In 1987 he graduated from the University of Nebraska at Omaha with a degree in criminal justice and philosophy. Synowiecki is descended from Polish immigrants, and his grandmother was born in Poland.

From 1990 to 2000 he was a probation officer and from 2000 to 2002 he was a probation supervisor. He won the Nebraska State Probation Officer of the Year in 1998.

== State legislature ==
He was appointed on January 7, 2002, to replace John Hilgert who had resigned. Synowiecki later was elected in 2002 to represent the 7th Nebraska legislative district and reelected in 2004.

He sat on the Appropriations committee and was the vice chairman of the Nebraska Retirement Systems.

In 2016, Synowiecki ran to regain his seat, losing to Tony Vargas.

Preceded by John Hilgert	Nebraska state senator-district 7; 2002-2008	Succeeded by Jeremy Nordquist

== See also ==
- Nebraska Legislature
- Poles in Omaha, Nebraska
