= Tom Brewer (politician) =

American politician

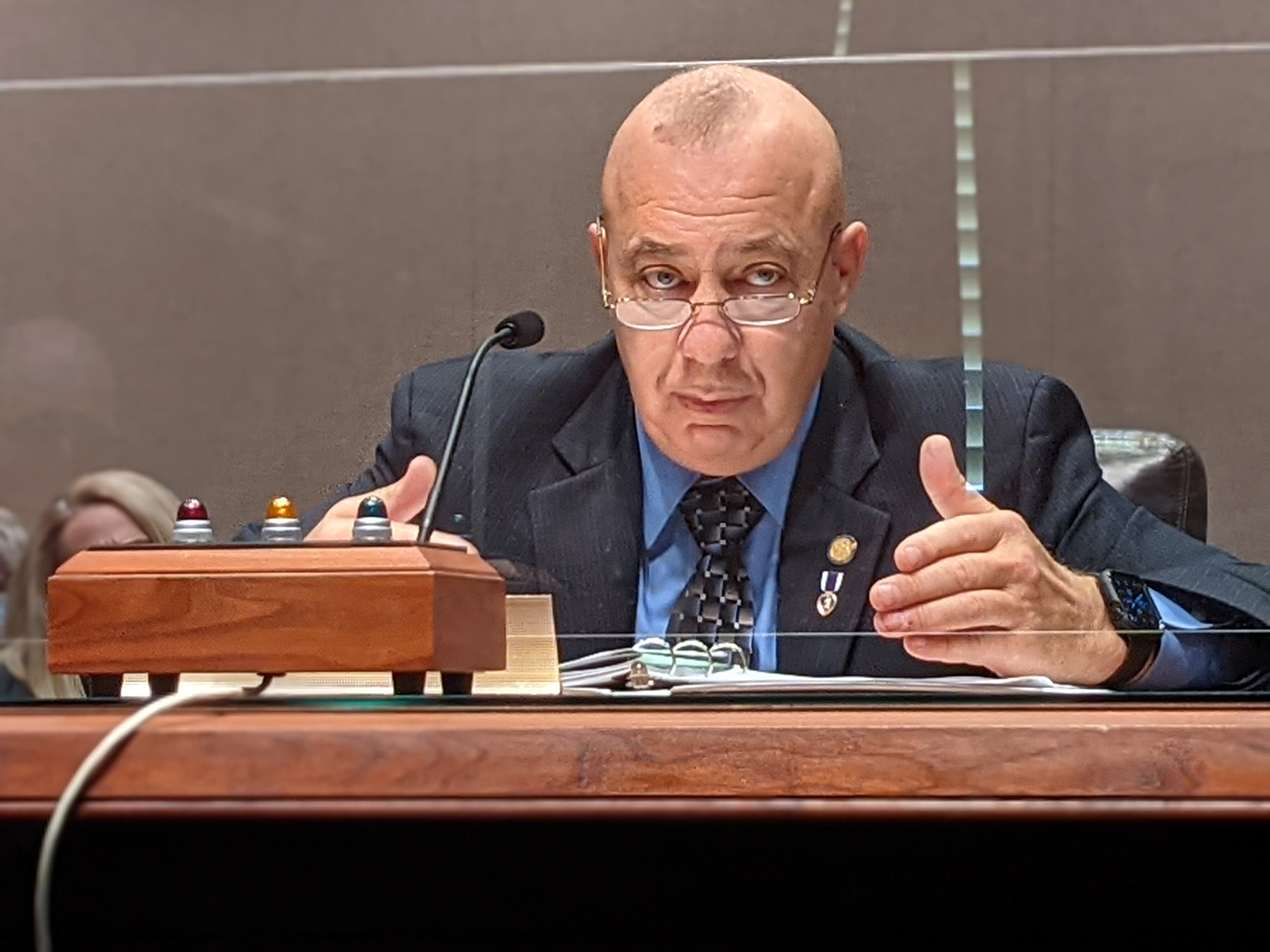

Member of the Nebraska Legislature from the 43rd district
- In office January 4, 2017 – January 8, 2025
- Preceded by: Al Davis
- Succeeded by: Tanya Storer

Personal details
- Born: August 6, 1958 (age 68) Casper, Wyoming, U.S.
- Party: Republican
- Education: Doane University (BA); United States Army War College (MA)
- Committees: Agriculture; Banking, Commerce and Insurance; Education; General Affairs; Government, Military and Veterans Affairs; State-Tribal Relations
- Website: www.VoteTomBrewer.com

Military service
- Allegiance: United States
- Branch/service: United States Army
- Years of service: 1977—2013
- Rank: Colonel
- Battles/wars: Gulf War, War in Afghanistan

Thomas Ross Brewer (born August 6, 1958) is an Oglala American retired military officer and politician who served as a member of the Nebraska Legislature from the 43rd legislative district. Elected in 2016, he assumed office in 2017 and left office in 2025.

== Early life and education ==
Brewer was born in Casper, Wyoming and attended high school in Gordon, Nebraska. His father, Ross Brewer, was a combat-wounded Army Ranger who was bayoneted in the Korean War.

He was active in Future Farmers of America as a teenager and earned his state degree and his American FFA Degree. He focused on agribusiness in FFA, working at a local grain elevator and also competing in parliamentary procedure, meats judging, welding, and public speaking. He credits this public speaking experience and other skills taught in FFA as having prepared him for his later military service and time as a state legislator. He was the first Native American to serve as a Nebraska FFA state officer.

He graduated with a Bachelor of Arts degree in History and Management from Doane University in 1988. As a student at Doane, he competed in cross country running and track, being named to the National Association of Intercollegiate Athletics (NAIA) All-Conference teams. In 1983, he attended classes at Moscow State University and the University of Leningrad in Russia. He is a graduate of the United States Army War College Defense Strategy Course and holds a Master's Degree from that institution.

== Military career ==
For 36 years, Brewer served as a member of the United States Army, including six tours in Afghanistan. Brewer was awarded the Bronze Star and two Purple Hearts.

He enlisted in the Army after he graduated high school in 1977. After attending U.S. Army Field Artillery School and earning the Air Assault and Airborne qualifications, he was commissioned an infantry officer in 1983. After infantry officer training, he completed the Pathfinder Course, Jumpmaster Course, and Ranger School, where he was the Honor Graduate.

In 1985, he was assigned to the 167th Cavalry Regiment as an attack helicopter pilot and qualified on the AH-1 Cobra, UH-1 Huey, and OH-58 Kiowa aircraft. He served with the 4th Brigade 1st Cavalry Division in Operation Desert Storm in Iraq.

He became an armor officer after achieving the rank of Major, running M1 Abrams tanks in a cavalry squadron.

=== Afghanistan ===
Brewer was mobilized to Afghanistan in May 2003 to take command of the training battalion of the Afghan National Army. On October 12, 2003, Brewer was shot six times and received numerous shrapnel injuries in an engagement at a decommissioned Soviet tank depot, later dubbed the "Battle of the Bone Yard." He was awarded the Bronze Star and his first Purple Heart as a result. The Guard News reported that this incident made Brewer the first field-grade officer wounded in the Afghanistan war.

Brewer credits Nepalese Royal Gurkha Sergeant Kajiman Limbu with a feat of heroism in helping recover Brewer from the battlefield and provide initial treatment of his wounds: "He was not a very big guy, he was all of about 130 pounds, and with gear I was around 275 pounds, but he flipped me over his shoulder, threw me over a stone fence, and then he jumped over himself. I was really impressed."

=== Domestic assignments ===
After recovering from his 2003 injuries, Brewer worked with the National Guard in its domestic counternarcotics mission. Brewer was part of the National Guard's emergency response to Hurricane Katrina, deploying to New Orleans in command of a thirty-member team as part of the recovery mission in September 2005.

In late 2007, Brewer was assigned as Operations Officer for the National Airborne Operations Center at Offutt Air Force Base near Omaha, Nebraska.

=== Return to Afghanistan ===
In January 2010, Brewer returned to Afghanistan, this time assigned as an advisor for the US CENTCOM counternarcotics mission in that country. While carrying out this assignment on December 16, 2011, the day before he was scheduled to return home, he was again severely injured after a rocket-propelled grenade struck his vehicle. He received the Secretary of Defense Medal for the Defense of Freedom for his conduct in this event. His injuries resulted in his involuntary medical retirement in 2013.

In total, Brewer served six tours of duty in Afghanistan and was deployed to neighboring Kurdistan for another two tours.

=== Ukraine ===
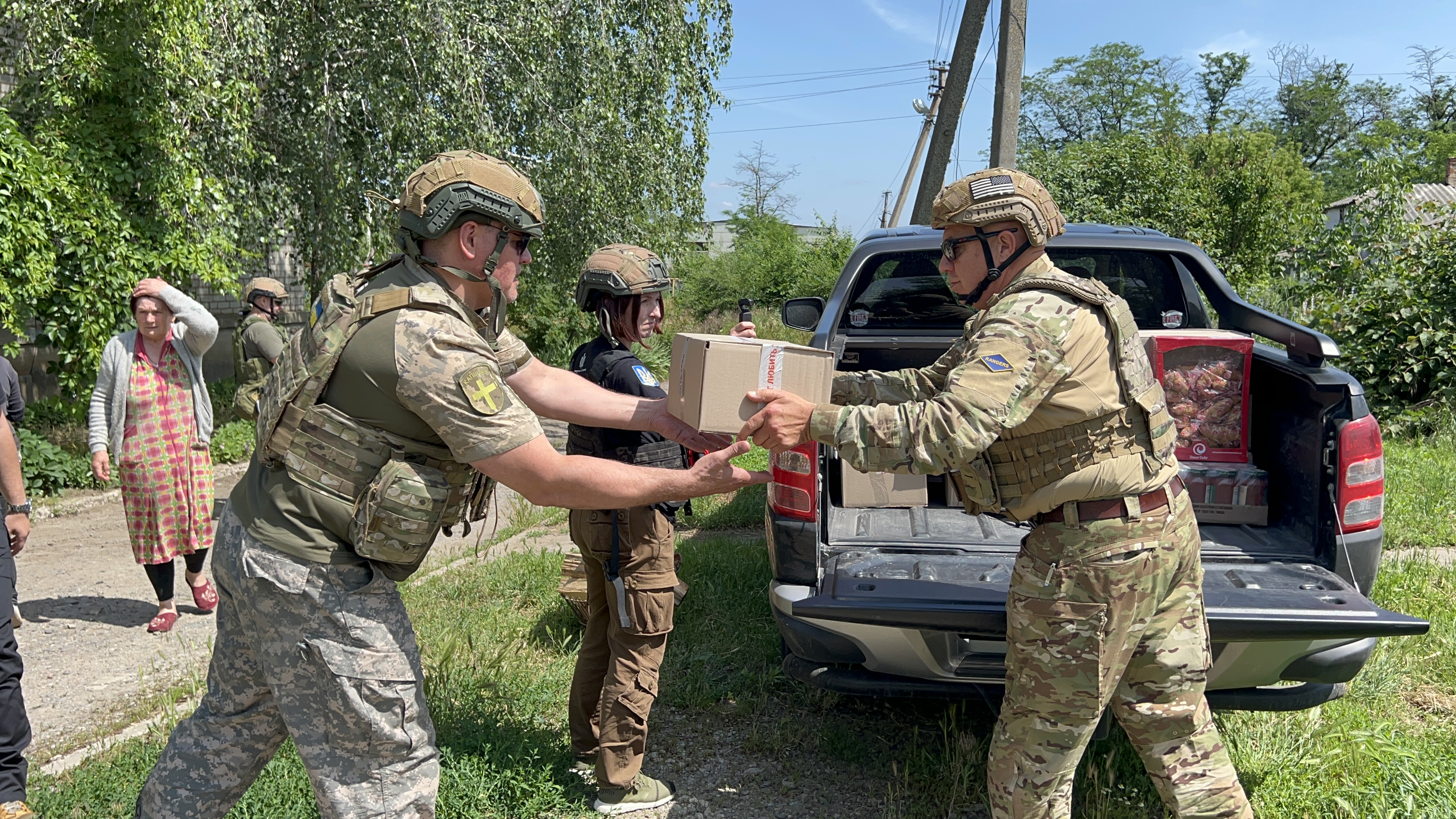
Brewer (right) delivers aid to civilians in Orikhiv in June 2023.

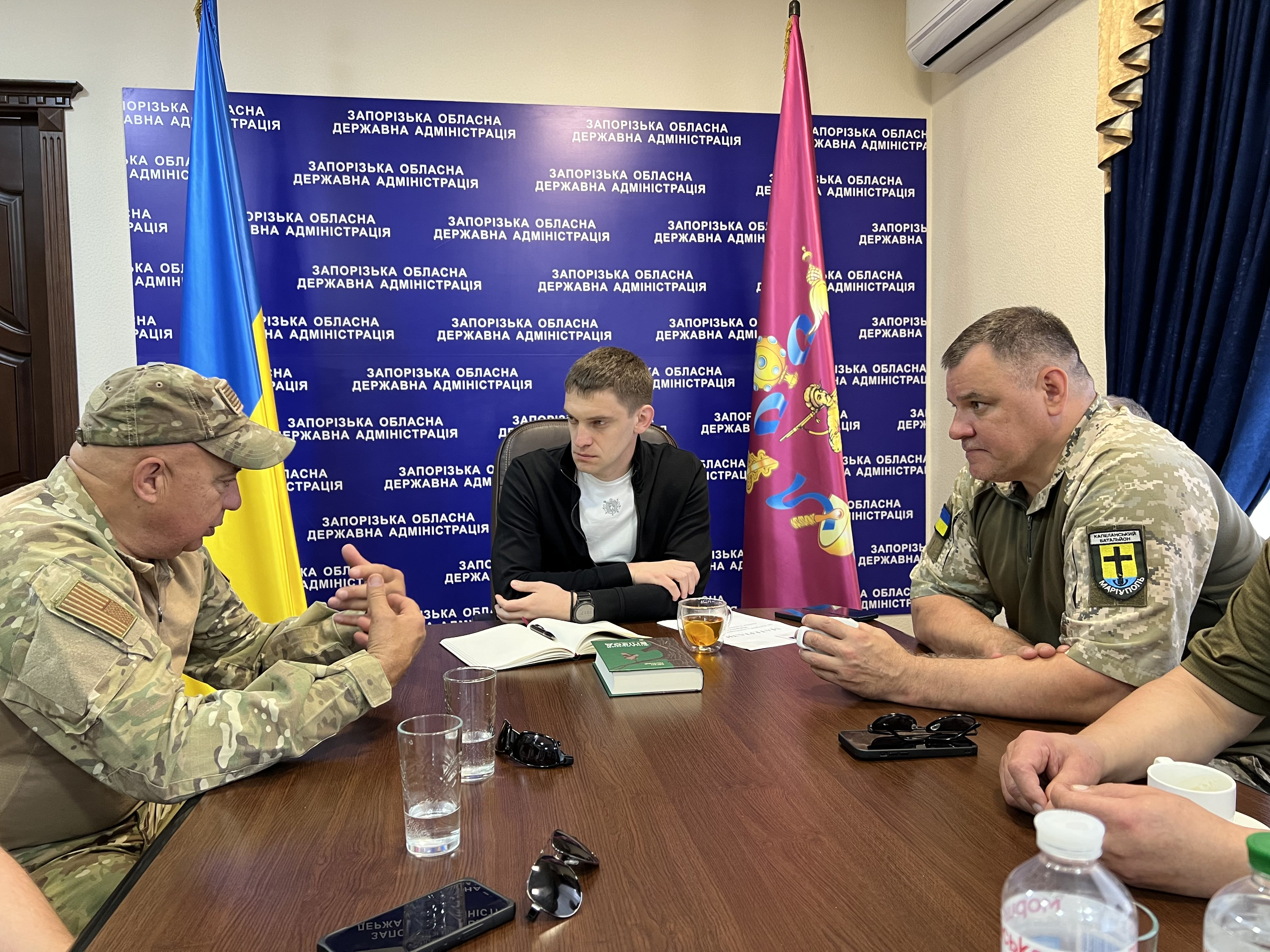
Brewer meets with Zaporizhzhia Oblast Governor Ivan Federov in May 2024.

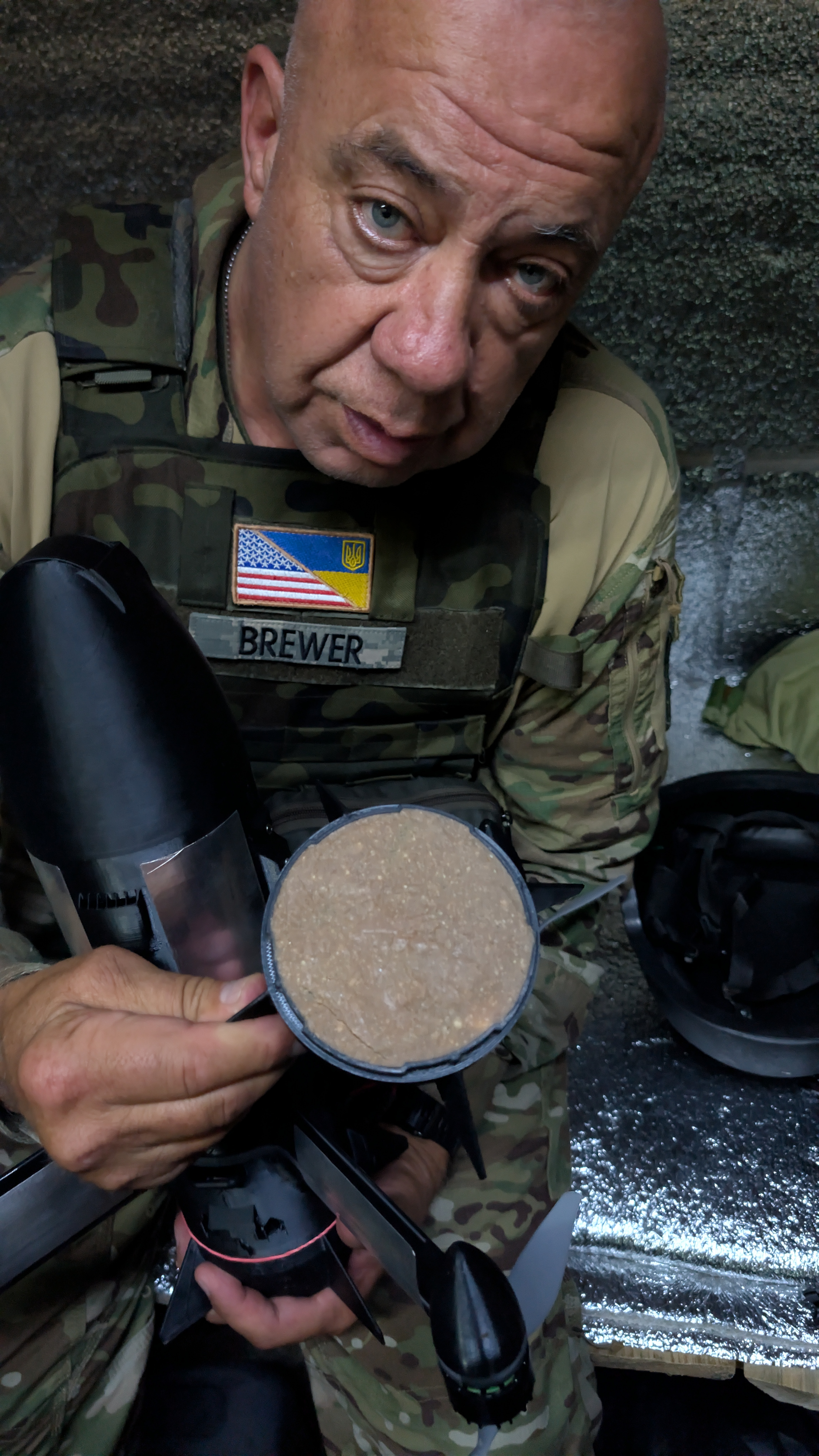
Tom Brewer with a Ukrainian interceptor drone and explosive warhead in 2026

Brewer has been supportive of Ukraine since the Russian invasion began in 2022, explaining that he serves as a "pipeline to share information" with members of Congress on the war. He began making visits to the country's frontlines in May 2022 to assist in training the Armed Forces of Ukraine and delivering supplies. As the war progressed, he reported back his observations on how foreign aid was affecting the conduct of the war.

During four trips to Ukraine in 2022, 2023, and 2024, Brewer "zig-zagged... through the country, from a hotel overlooking Maidan Square to the controlled border zone in the far northeast," taking him closer to the conflict than any other elected official from the United States. According to Brewer, "We went past where the Ukrainian forces have said 'We're going no closer.' You know you're getting close to the front when the friendly army is going the other way on the road past you[.]"

During a trip in July 2022, he said that if the US did not help Ukraine, then American troops would eventually be fighting Russians. He has advocated for NATO to provide training on location in Ukraine rather than shuttling trainees to and from other member nations. He has also advocated for the United States to embed advisors who could learn from the Ukrainian experience with drones and avoid American losses in a future conflict.

On his return to Ukraine in Spring of 2024, Brewer talked extensively about his work on the ground in the country and his coordination with Washington D.C. He told Ukrinform of work with federal lawmakers stating, “I am a State Senator, but most of what I do is more general, humanitarian type help. Some of it is gathering information to share with U.S Senators and Congressmen about Ukraine’s needs, to show whether what they are giving is useful and Ukraine needs more of or is of no value at all. We need to make sure that we are not wasteful in how we manage the resources we give Ukraine. So I have functioned as a pipeline to share information back because, obviously, anybody who is a Senator or Congressman, they may make the trip to Kyiv for a photo-op, but nobody comes here to go beyond the capital because it's just not something many feel comfortable with, I guess.”

During that time he also appeared in Kharkiv at a joint press conference with Sergeant Sarah Ashton-Cirillo of the Defense Intelligence of Ukraine, hosted by Kharkiv Media Center, where he discussed federal funding issues related to Ukraine.

In July 2024, Brewer described the modern battlefield with the advent of drone warfare: “I mean, you got drones that are out looking... Nobody’s safe anywhere on the battlefield ... That’s why it’s become this defensive battle where people live in holes and come out rarely if there’s any drone activity.”

By June 2026, Brewer had traveled to Ukraine nine times since the 2022 full-scale invasion. In an interview before a 2026 visit, Brewer lamented that the ongoing conflict had become a "forgotten war" and had been subject to less coverage by American media. Congressman Don Bacon said of Brewer, "He’s a hero, a brave guy, full of courage. I love being around him. He’s smart and he has moral clarity on this war. That’s why he keeps going back out there to help."

== Political career ==
=== 2014 Congressional Campaign ===
Shortly after completing rehabilitation from injuries sustained from the 2011 rocket-propelled grenade attack in Afghanistan, Brewer announced his campaign for Nebraska's Third Congressional District seat against Republican incumbent Adrian Smith in the 2014 primary election. Brewer lost to Smith in the Republican primary, receiving 31.8 percent of the votes cast in the two-way race.

=== Nebraska Legislature ===
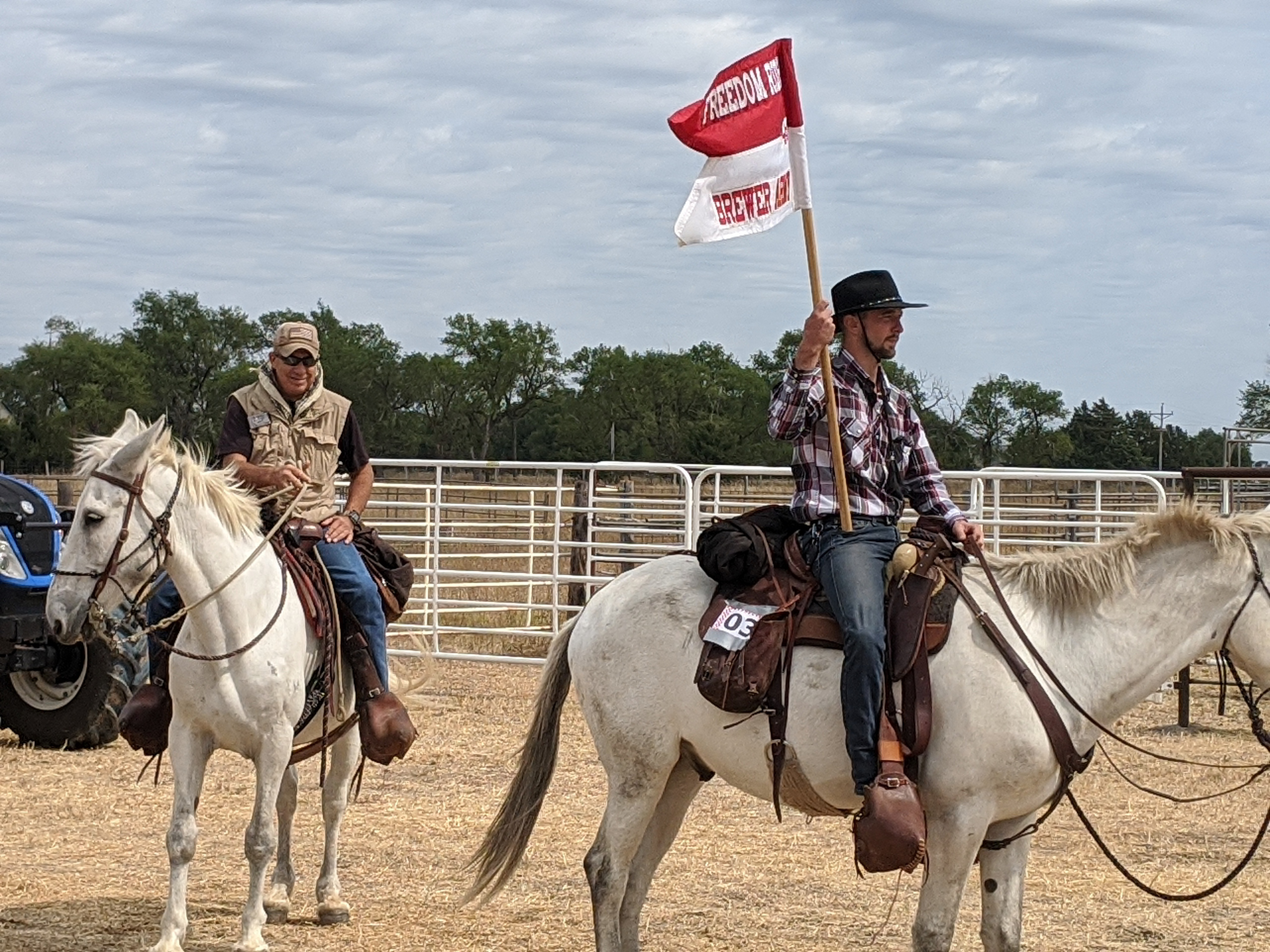
Brewer (left) prepares to enter the Brown County rodeo grounds with a "Brewer Army" guidon bearer as part of a 2020 campaign event.

Brewer was elected to the Nebraska Legislature in 2016, defeating incumbent Al Davis. Brewer received 9,169 votes of 17,545 cast (52.2 percent) in the general election.

Brewer faced a challenge in his 2020 reelection campaign from ranch owner Tanya Storer. In the 2020 general election, he won reelection with 57.9 percent of the total votes cast. The relatively large amount of money spent on the race drew commentary from local media.

As a legislator, Brewer focused on veterans issues, Native American issues, religious freedom, energy policy, and firearms laws. As chairman of the Government, Military and Veterans Affairs Committee, he has also carried a number of bills relating to elections. According to a methodology established by Craig Volden and Alan Wiseman in their "Legislative Effectiveness in the American States" article, Brewer was the second most effective member of the 108th Nebraska Legislature.

==== Military and veterans ====
Brewer sponsored a succession of bills to reduce and ultimately eliminate taxation of military retirement benefits. His Legislative Bill 1394 passed in 2024, exempting National Guard drill and annual training pay from Nebraska income tax.

Brewer introduced LB 253 in 2023 and later amended it to create a new veterans court program that would allow veterans to have their criminal cases dismissed upon successful completion of a specialized training mandated by the court. Former United States Secretary of Defense Chuck Hagel spoke in support of the proposal at a public hearing on the bill, which ultimately passed in 2024 on a vote of 44-0.

Citing the effects of his own military service as a motivation, Brewer introduced successful legislation to improve support for emergency responders suffering from post-traumatic stress disorder.

==== Native American issues ====
Early in his first term in the Nebraska Legislature, Brewer took a prominent role in discussions about how to address alcoholism on the Pine Ridge Indian Reservation and the alcohol trade in the border town of Whiteclay, Nebraska.

In his second year in the Unicameral, Brewer co-sponsored legislation to replace the statue of William Jennings Bryan with one honoring Chief Standing Bear, and he subsequently served on the committee that commissioned the replacement statue and participated in its installation at the United States Capitol. Brewer later introduced successful legislation to rename a state government building after Chief Standing Bear.

Brewer introduced LB 154 in 2019, directing the Nebraska State Patrol to investigate and publish a report on missing and murdered indigenous women in Nebraska. Governor Pete Ricketts signed it into law on March 7, 2019.

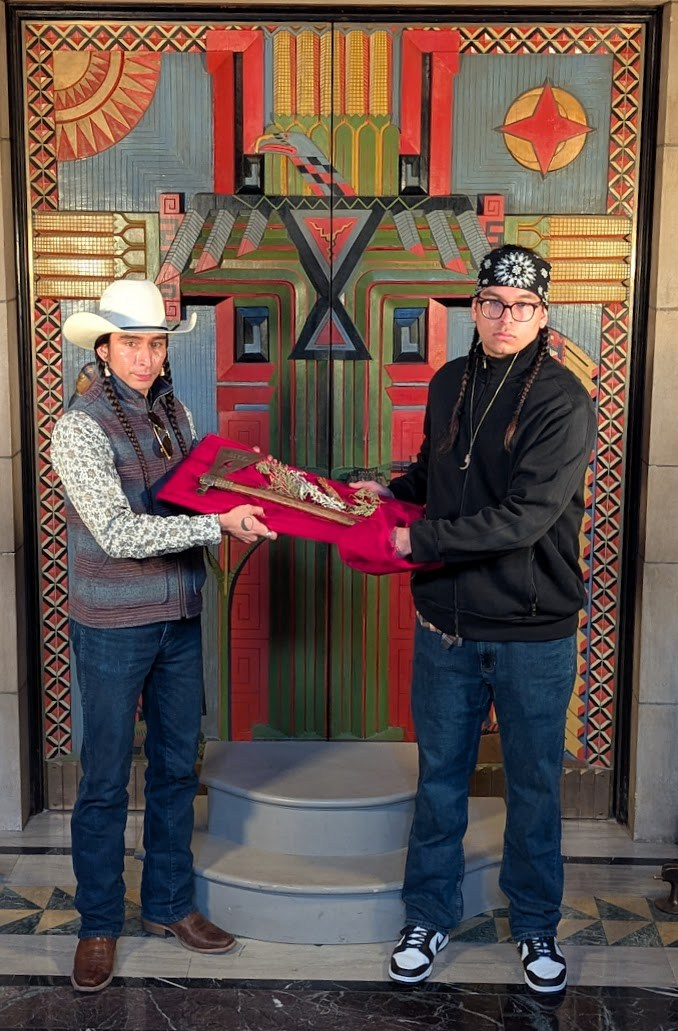
Two Ponca men display Chief Standing Bear's pipe tomahawk at the Nebraska State Capitol

In 2021, Brewer made national news for his successful efforts to secure the return of Chief Standing Bear's pipe tomahawk from the Peabody Museum of Archaeology and Ethnology at Harvard University. Explaining his reasons for bringing a resolution calling for the return of the artifact, Brewer said "Harvard has no connection to Standing Bear, it has no connection to the Ponca people. Harvard literally has very little reason to keep this Tomahawk."

In 2022, the Ponca Tribe of Nebraska recognized Brewer's work on Native American issues, stating that

"Senator Tom Brewer has been instrumental in many of the most momentous celebrations of the Ponca Tribe of Nebraska. From the dedication of statues of Chief Standing Bear in the Ponca Tribal homeland in Niobrara and in the nation's capitol in Washington D.C. to advocating for the return of Standing Bear's Tomahawk to the Ponca Tribe to the renaming and dedication of the Chief Standing Bear Justice Administration Building, Senator Brewer has worked within the Nebraska Legislature to promote the Ponca Tribe continually and the legacy of Chief Standing Bear. Senator Brewer remains a tireless advocate for all native peoples in the state of Nebraska."

In 2024, Brewer saw his "First Freedom Act" pass as part of a package prioritized by the Government, Military and Veterans Affairs Committee. This bill included protections duplicating those found in the federal Religious Freedom Restoration Act and provisions specifically protecting the wearing of tribal regalia in Nebraska schools. Brewer had previously introduced the First Freedom Act and tribal regalia proposals in 2022 as separate bills.

In part for his work on these topics, Brewer received the Chief Standing Bear Prize for Courage from the Chief Standing Bear Project in 2023.

==== Energy policy ====
Over his two terms in office, Brewer introduced a number of bills attempting to limit the expansion of industrial wind turbines in rural Nebraska. He has been described as "the figurehead of the opposition to wind energy in Nebraska."

He was actively involved in an effort to prevent construction of the Nebraska Public Power District's proposed "R-Project," a 226-mile transmission line through the Nebraska Sandhills. Brewer filed an amicus brief in support of a lawsuit brought by ranch owners and environmental groups against the United States Fish and Wildlife Service alleging failure to properly enforce provisions of the Endangered Species Act while considering the environmental impact of the R-Project proposal.

==== Firearms ====
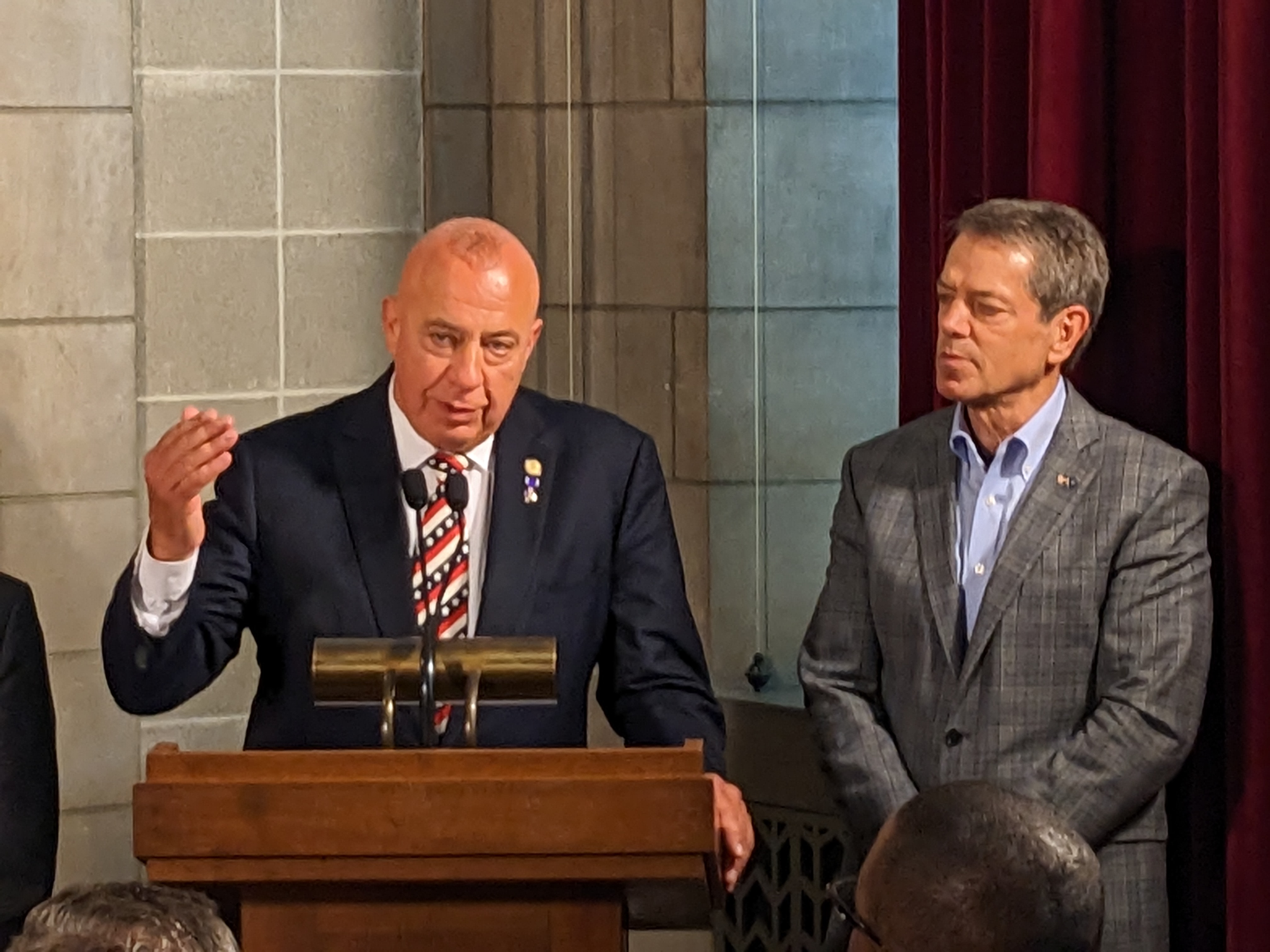
Governor Jim Pillen looks on as Senator Tom Brewer delivers a speech at the LB 77 signing ceremony on April 25, 2023.

As a freshman senator in 2017, Brewer introduced several unsuccessful firearms-related bills, including a constitutional carry proposal. He introduced several more iterations of this proposal over the course of his two terms in office. He finally succeeded in passing permitless carry and state preemption legislation with LB 77 in 2023. The Legislature's only two African-American senators broke ranks with Democratic Party colleagues to support the bill, and this support was credited as making its passage possible. These senators, Justin Wayne and Terrell McKinney, cited racist motivations of the original 1873 state concealed weapons ban and racist enforcement of it in Omaha as central to their support of the change.

Brewer introduced LB 582 in 2019 to make it easier to prosecute criminal cases relating to stolen guns. The bill passed early in the 2020 session.

In 2024, Brewer introduced school security legislation to authorize armed security by non-law enforcement at public and private schools in the state of Nebraska. A compromise version of the bill limited the changes to smaller rural public schools, private schools, and post-secondary institutions.

==== Elections ====
As chairman of the committee with jurisdiction over elections, Brewer frequently carried omnibus election law updates.

In 2023, Brewer carried the bill to implement photographic voter identification after Nebraska voters approved a 2022 constitutional amendment requiring it. The bill ultimately passed in the final moments of the 2023 session despite a contentious fourteen-hour filibuster.

==== Reputation as a senator ====
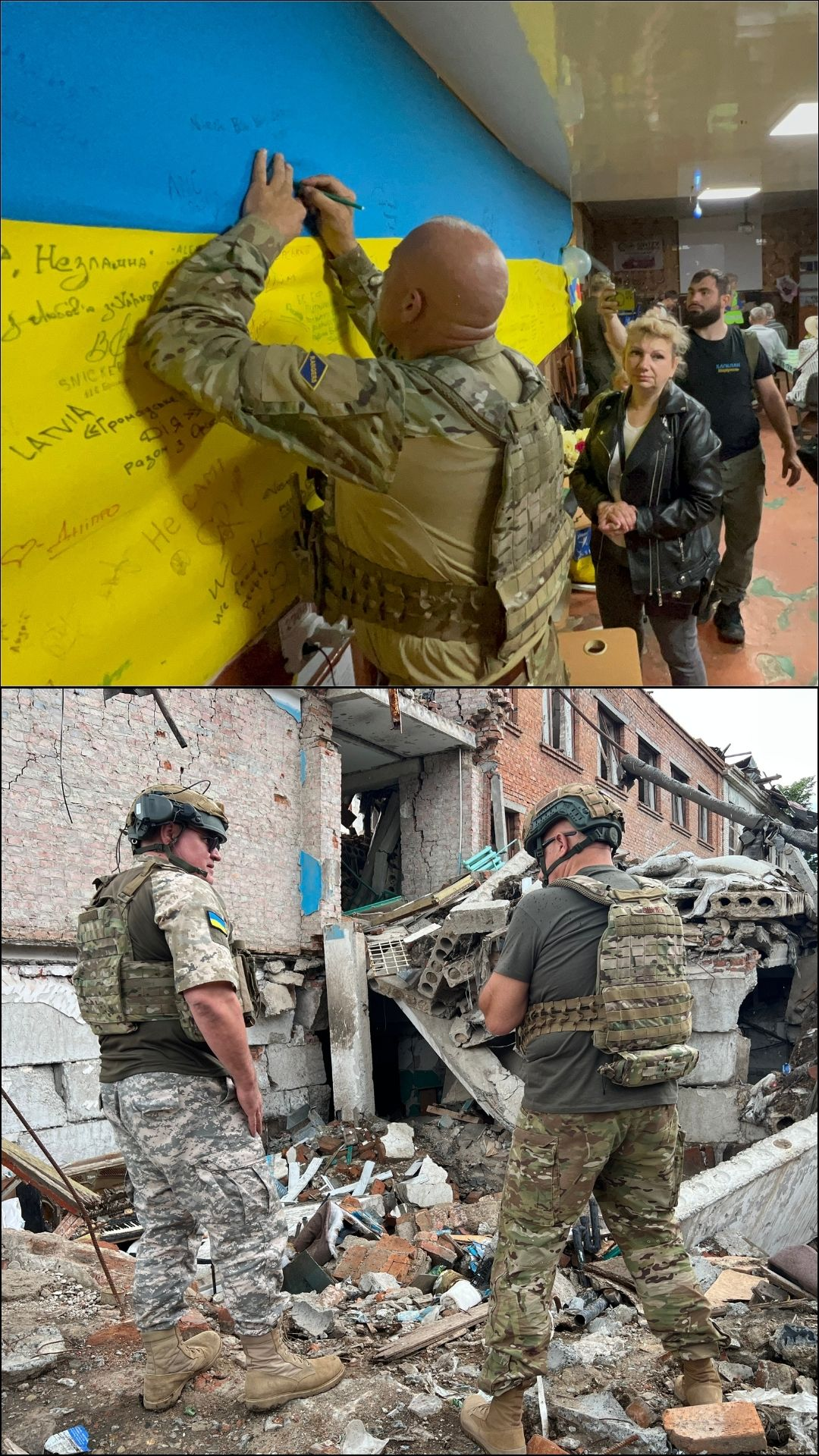
(Top) Brewer signing a Ukrainian flag in the basement of a humanitarian aid depot in Orikhiv, Ukraine in June 2023. (Bottom) Brewer with chaplain Gennadiy Mokhnenko at the ruins of the same building in May 2024.

From before his first election in 2016, Brewer was described as an unusual fit for the job of senator. He campaigned from the back of a mule, riding 500 miles across the Nebraska Sandhills in a legislative district larger than New Hampshire, Connecticut, and Rhode Island combined. He competed in international sniper competitions. In 2021, he made news when he led a diverse team of five Nebraska legislators on a climb of Mount Kilimanjaro. An article published by the National Conference of State Legislatures described the team's training regimen and their different political points of view, and the relationship-building on the excursion that had a subsequent effect on the climbers' legislative relationships.

He also drew attention when he traveled to Ukraine in wartime on four occasions during his tenure in the Legislature. Brewer's legislative colleagues presented him with a framed Ukrainian flag featuring their signatures at the conclusion of his final regular legislative session in April 2024.

== Competitive marksmanship ==
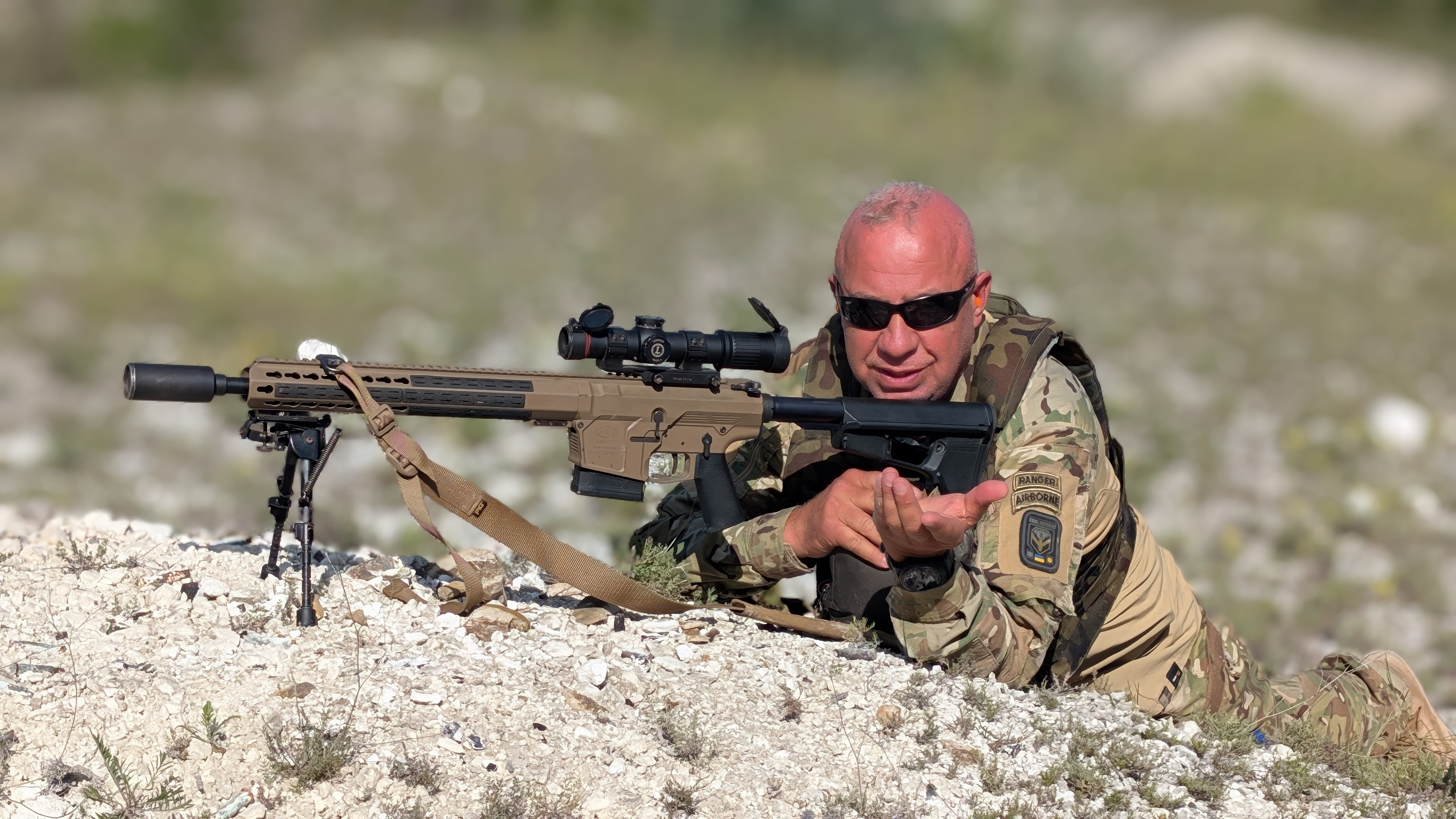
Brewer prepares to fire a Ukrainian UAR-10 rifle during a training exercise with the 117th Territorial Defense Brigade in the Donbas region of Ukraine on June 5, 2026

Brewer has long been involved in competitive shooting. He helped coach the 1996 U.S. Men's shooting team in preparation for the 1996 Olympic Games, and he has won ten national championships as a shooter and others as a coach of the All Guard and All Army shooting teams. In 1999, he was named director of the Marksmanship Training Center at Little Rock, Arkansas. As a soldier, he qualified as a Distinguished Rifleman and Distinguished Pistol Shot, and he earned the President's Hundred tab awarded to the hundred top-scoring military and civilian shooters in the President's Pistol and President's Rifle Matches.

After previously taking first place as a military servicemember in 1997, he returned to a world sniper competition in Bulgaria as a sitting state senator in 2018. He competed again in 2019, and his two-man team took the top prize in the 2019 International T-Class Confederation Multigun competition. This win occurred weeks after Brewer broke several ribs in a bicycle accident while training for the contest.

== Electoral history ==
2014 Nebraska's 3rd congressional district Republican primary
Party	Candidate	Votes	%
Republican	Adrian Smith (incumbent)	66,881	68.2
Republican	Tom Brewer	31,215	31.8
Total votes		98,096	100.0

Nebraska's 43rd Legislative District Election, 2016
Primary election
Party	Candidate	Votes	%
Republican	Tom Brewer	9,169	52.2
Republican	Al Davis (incumbent)	8,376	47.7
Total votes		17,545	100.0
Republican hold			

Nebraska's 43rd Legislative District Election, 2020
Primary election
Party	Candidate	Votes	%
Republican	Tom Brewer (incumbent)	8,043	61.2
Republican	Tanya Storer	5,100	38.8
Total votes		18,448	100.0
General election
Republican	Tom Brewer (incumbent)	10,688	57.9
Republican	Tanya Storer	7,760	42.1
Total votes		18,448	100.0
Republican hold			

== Personal life ==
Brewer is a member of the Oglala Lakota tribe and the first Native American elected to the state legislature of Nebraska. He is a descendant of Chief Red Cloud.

== Military awards and decorations ==
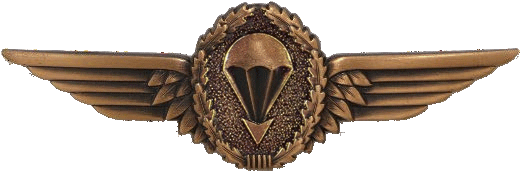
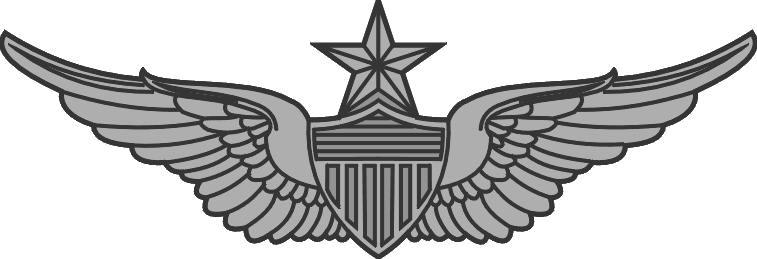
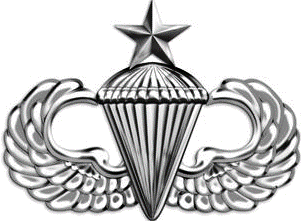
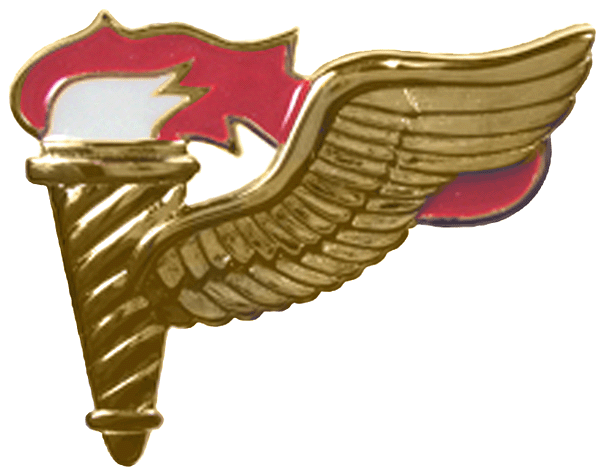
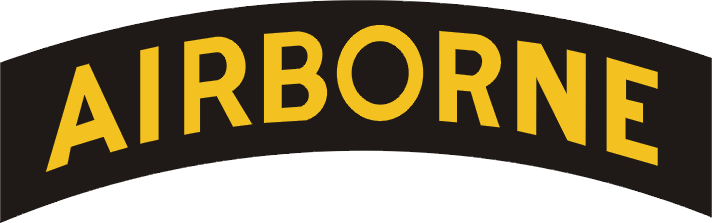

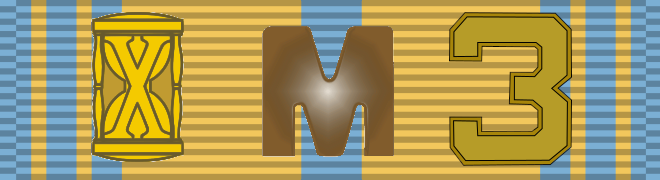

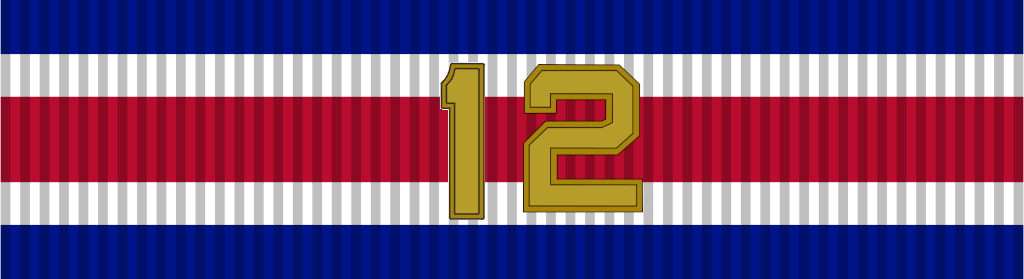

German Parachutist Badge
Combat Infantryman Badge
Expert Infantryman Badge
Senior Aviator Badge
Senior Parachutist Badge
Air Assault Badge
Pathfinder Badge
President's Hundred Tab
Ranger Tab
Airborne Tab
Bronze Star Medal with cluster		Purple Heart with cluster
Defense Meritorious Service Medal	Meritorious Service Medal with 4 clusters	Aerial Achievement Medal
Air and Space Commendation Medal	Army Commendation Medal with 5 clusters	Army Achievement Medal with 3 clusters
Global War on Terrorism Expeditionary Medal with campaign star	Global War on Terrorism Service Medal	Humanitarian Service Medal
Military Outstanding Volunteer Service Medal	Armed Forces Reserve Medal w/ gold hourglass (30 years) and 3 mobilization devices	Non-Commissioned Officer Professional Development Ribbon
Army Service Ribbon	Army Overseas Service Ribbon	North Atlantic Treaty Organization Medal (International Security Assistance Force)
Army Reserve Components Overseas Training Ribbon w/ numeral 12	Nebraska Meritorious Service Medal w/ cluster	Nebraska Commendation Medal w/ 5 clusters
Nebraska Individual Achievement Medal w/ cluster	Nebraska National Guard Recruiting Achievement Ribbon	Nebraska National Guard Desert Storm/Shield Service Ribbon
Nebraska Homeland Defense Service Ribbon w/ mobilization device	Nebraska Emergency Service Medal w/ star	Nebraska Service Medal w/ "XXV" device
