= Dennis Utter =

American politician (1939–2011)

Member of the Nebraska Legislature from the 33rd district
- In office 2009–2011
- Preceded by: Carroll Burling
- Succeeded by: Les Seiler

Personal details
- Born: February 21, 1939 Wheatland, Wyoming, U.S.
- Died: December 27, 2011 (aged 72) Hastings, Nebraska, U.S.
- Party: Republican

Dennis Utter (February 21, 1939 – December 27, 2011) was an American politician and a member of the unicameral Nebraska Legislature.

== Birth ==
Dennis Utter was born on February 21, 1939, in Wheatland, Wyoming.

== Residence ==
Utter's hometown is Hastings, Nebraska.

== Religion ==
Utter was Presbyterian.

== Family ==
Utter was married to Kathryn Preuit, and they had three children named Mark, Ward, and Denise.

== Education ==
Utter received his education at the following institutions:

- BS, Agriculture, University of Wyoming
- MS, Agricultural Economics, University of Wyoming
- Graduate, Colorado School of Banking

== Organizations ==
Utter was a member of the following organizations:

- Board Member, Adams County Senior Servies
- Past President, Kenesaw Community Club
- Past President/Member, Kenesaw Public Schools Foundation
- Board Member, Mary Lanning Health Care Foundation
- Past President, Nebraska Bankers Association
- Past Member, Nebraska Bankers Association/American Bankers Association
- Past Member, University of Nebraska Medical Center Board of Councilors

== State legislature ==
Utter was elected in 2008 to represent the 33rd Nebraska legislative district. He was a member of the Banking, Commerce and Insurance committee, the Revenue committee, and Rules committees. Utter was replaced by Hastings lawyer Les Seiler, who was sworn in on January 14, 2012, following the second week of the 2012 legislative session.

== Death ==
Utter died in 2011 at the age of 72 from lung disease.

== See also ==
- Nebraska Legislature

== Sources ==
- "Nebraska Unicameral Legislature". Sen. Dennis Utter.

Preceded by Carroll Burling	Nebraska state senator – District 33; 2009–2011	Succeeded by Les Seiler
