= Ardyce Bohlke =

American politician

Ardyce Linn Gidley Bohlke
- Born: November 2, 1943; Omaha, Nebraska, U.S.
- Died: February 19, 2013 (aged 69)
- Education: University of Nebraska–Lincoln
- Spouse: Jon Halsey Bohlke

Ardyce Linn Gidley Bohlke (November 2, 1943 – February 19, 2013) was an American educator, speech pathologist, and politician.

== Early life ==
On November 2, 1943, Bohlke was born in Omaha, Nebraska. Her parents were Arthur William and Naomi Gidley.

== Education ==
In 1961 Bohlke graduated from Omaha Central High School. She graduated from the University of Nebraska in 1965 and was a member of Pi Beta Phi Sorority.

== Career ==
Bohlke was a speech pathologist and served eight years on the Hastings, Nebraska school board.

In 1991, Governor Ben Nelson appointed Bohlke to the Nebraska State Legislature as a Democrat. She was subsequently elected in both 1992 and 1996 and served until 2001.

== Personal life ==
She married Jon Halsey Bohlke February 4, 1967. On February 19, 2013, Bohlke died from brain tumor in Hastings, Nebraska at age 69.
