= 2016 United States House of Representatives election ratings =

The 2016 United States House of Representatives elections were held November 8, 2016, to elect representatives from all 435 congressional districts across each of the 50 U.S. states. The six non-voting delegates from the District of Columbia and the inhabited U.S. territories were also elected. Numerous federal, state, and local elections, including the 2016 presidential election and the 2016 Senate elections, were also held on this date.

== Election ratings ==
=== Latest published ratings for competitive seats ===
Several sites and individuals publish ratings of competitive seats. The seats listed below were considered competitive (not "safe" or "solid") by at least one of the rating groups. These ratings are based upon factors such as the strength of the incumbent (if the incumbent is running for re-election), the strength of the candidates, and the partisan history of the district (the Cook Partisan Voting Index is one example of this metric). Each rating describes the likelihood of a given outcome in the election.

Most election ratings use:

- "tossup": no advantage
- "tilt" (used by some predictors): advantage that is not quite as strong as "lean"
- "lean": slight advantage
- "likely": significant, but surmountable, advantage
- "safe" or "solid": near-certain chance of victory

The following are the latest published ratings for competitive seats.

District	CPVI	Incumbent	Previous result	Cook November 7, 2016	Rothenberg November 3, 2016	Sabato November 7, 2016	RCP October 31, 2016	Daily Kos November 7, 2016	Winner
Alaska at-large	R+12	Don Young (R)	51.0% R	Lean R	Safe R	Lean R	Likely R	Likely R	Don Young (R)
Arizona 1	R+4	Ann Kirkpatrick (D) (retiring) (Note: Retired to run for senate)	52.6% D	Lean D	Lean D	Lean D	Tossup	Lean D	Tom O'Halleran (D)
Arizona 2	R+3	Martha McSally (R)	50.0% R	Likely R	Safe R	Likely R	Lean R	Likely R	Martha McSally (R)
California 3	D+3	John Garamendi (D)	52.7% D	Safe D	Safe D	Safe D	Likely D	Safe D	John Garamendi (D)
California 7	EVEN	Ami Bera (D)	50.4% D	Lean D	Lean D	Lean D	Lean D	Lean D	Ami Bera (D)
California 10	R+1	Jeff Denham (R)	56.2% R	Tossup	Lean R	Lean D (flip)	Lean R	Tossup	Jeff Denham (R)
California 16	D+7	Jim Costa (D)	50.7% D	Safe D	Safe D	Safe D	Likely D	Safe D	Jim Costa (D)
California 21	D+2	David Valadao (R)	57.8% R	Lean R	Likely R	Lean R	Likely R	Lean R	David Valadao (R)
California 24	D+4	Lois Capps (D) (retiring)	51.9% D	Lean D	Likely D	Lean D	Lean D	Lean D	Salud Carbajal (D)
California 25	R+3	Steve Knight (R)	53.3% R	Tossup	Likely R	Lean D (flip)	Tossup	Tossup	Steve Knight (R)
California 48	R+7	Dana Rohrabacher (R)	64.1% R	Safe R	Safe R	Safe R	Likely R	Safe R	Dana Rohrabacher (R)
California 49	R+4	Darrell Issa (R)	60.2% R	Tossup	Tilt R	Lean D (flip)	Tossup	Tossup	Darrell Issa (R)
California 52	D+2	Scott Peters (D)	51.6% D	Safe D	Safe D	Safe D	Likely D	Safe D	Scott Peters (D)
Colorado 3	R+5	Scott Tipton (R)	58.0% R	Likely R	Safe R	Likely R	Likely R	Lean R	Scott Tipton (R)
Colorado 6	D+1	Mike Coffman (R)	51.9% R	Tossup	Tilt R	Lean R	Tossup	Tossup	Mike Coffman (R)
Florida 2	R+18	Gwen Graham (D) (retiring)	50.5% D	Likely R (flip)	Safe R (flip)	Safe R (flip)	Likely R (flip)	Safe R (flip)	Neal Dunn (R)
Florida 7	R+2	John Mica (R)	63.6% R	Tossup	Tilt D (flip)	Lean D (flip)	Tossup	Tossup	Stephanie Murphy (D)
Florida 10	D+9	Daniel Webster (R) (switching seats) (Note: Contested the new 11th and won.)	61.5% R	Likely D (flip)	Safe D (flip)	Safe D (flip)	Likely D (flip)	Safe D (flip)	Val Demings (D)
Florida 13	D+3	David Jolly (R)	75.2% R	Lean D (flip)	Lean D (flip)	Lean D (flip)	Lean D (flip)	Lean D (flip)	Charlie Crist (D)
Florida 18	R+3	Patrick Murphy (D) (retiring)	59.8% D	Lean R (flip)	Tossup	Lean R (flip)	Tossup	Tossup	Brian Mast (R)
Florida 26	EVEN	Carlos Curbelo (R)	51.5% R	Tossup	Tossup	Lean R	Tossup	Tossup	Carlos Curbelo (R)
Florida 27	R+1	Ileana Ros-Lehtinen (R)	100.0% R	Likely R	Safe R	Safe R	Likely R	Safe R	Ileana Ros-Lehtinen (R)
Illinois 10	D+8	Robert Dold (R)	51.3% R	Tossup	Tossup	Lean D (flip)	Tossup	Tossup	Brad Schneider (D)
Illinois 12	EVEN	Mike Bost (R)	52.5% R	Likely R	Safe R	Likely R	Likely R	Likely R	Mike Bost (R)
Illinois 17	D+7	Cheri Bustos (D)	55.5% D	Safe D	Safe D	Safe D	Likely D	Safe D	Cheri Bustos (D)
Indiana 2	R+6	Jackie Walorski (R)	58.9% R	Likely R	Safe R	Likely R	Likely R	Likely R	Jackie Walorski (R)
Indiana 9	R+9	Todd Young (R) (retiring)	62.2% R	Lean R	Likely R	Lean R	Likely R	Lean R	Trey Hollingsworth (R)
Iowa 1	D+5	Rod Blum (R)	51.1% R	Tossup	Tossup	Lean R	Tossup	Tossup	Rod Blum (R)
Iowa 2	D+4	Dave Loebsack (D)	52.4% D	Safe D	Safe D	Safe D	Likely D	Safe D	Dave Loebsack (D)
Iowa 3	EVEN	David Young (R)	52.8% R	Lean R	Tilt R	Lean R	Lean R	Lean R	David Young (R)
Kansas 3	R+5	Kevin Yoder (R)	60.0% R	Lean R	Lean R	Lean R	Lean R	Lean R	Kevin Yoder (R)
Maine 2	D+2	Bruce Poliquin (R)	47.0% R	Tossup	Tossup	Lean D (flip)	Tossup	Tossup	Bruce Poliquin (R)
Maryland 6	D+4	John K. Delaney (D)	49.5% D	Likely D	Safe D	Safe D	Likely D	Safe D	John K. Delaney (D)
Michigan 1	R+5	Dan Benishek (R) (retiring)	52.1% R	Lean R	Tilt R	Lean R	Tossup	Tossup	Jack Bergman (R)
Michigan 6	R+1	Fred Upton (R)	55.9% R	Safe R	Safe R	Safe R	Likely R	Safe R	Fred Upton (R)
Michigan 7	R+3	Tim Walberg (R)	53.5% R	Likely R	Likely R	Lean R	Lean R	Lean R	Tim Walberg (R)
Michigan 8	R+2	Mike Bishop (R)	54.6% R	Lean R	Safe R	Likely R	Likely R	Likely R	Mike Bishop (R)
Minnesota 1	R+1	Tim Walz (D)	54.3% D	Safe D	Safe D	Safe D	Likely D	Safe D	Tim Walz (D)
Minnesota 2	R+2	John Kline (R) (retiring)	56.0% R	Tossup	Tilt D (flip)	Lean D (flip)	Lean D (flip)	Tossup	Jason Lewis (R)
Minnesota 3	R+2	Erik Paulsen (R)	62.2% R	Lean R	Likely R	Lean R	Lean R	Lean R	Erik Paulsen (R)
Minnesota 7	R+6	Collin Peterson (D)	54.3% D	Safe D	Safe D	Safe D	Likely D	Safe D	Collin Peterson (D)
Minnesota 8	D+1	Rick Nolan (D)	48.5% D	Tossup	Lean D	Lean D	Tossup	Tossup	Rick Nolan (D)
Montana at-large	R+7	Ryan Zinke (R)	55.4% R	Likely R	Likely R	Likely R	Likely R	Likely R	Ryan Zinke (R)
Nebraska 2	R+4	Brad Ashford (D)	49.0% D	Tossup	Tilt D	Lean D	Tossup	Tossup	Don Bacon (R)
Nevada 3	EVEN	Joe Heck (R) (retiring)	60.8% R	Tossup	Tossup	Lean D (flip)	Tossup	Lean D (flip)	Jacky Rosen (D)
Nevada 4	D+4	Cresent Hardy (R)	48.5% R	Lean D (flip)	Tilt D (flip)	Lean D (flip)	Lean D (flip)	Lean D (flip)	Ruben Kihuen (D)
New Hampshire 1	R+1	Frank Guinta (R)	51.7% R	Lean D (flip)	Tilt D (flip)	Lean D (flip)	Lean D (flip)	Lean D (flip)	Carol Shea Porter (D)
New Jersey 5	R+4	Scott Garrett (R)	55.4% R	Tossup	Tilt D (flip)	Lean D (flip)	Tossup	Tossup	Josh Gottheimer (D)
New York 1	R+2	Lee Zeldin (R)	54.4% R	Likely R	Lean R	Lean R	Tossup	Likely R	Lee Zeldin (R)
New York 3	EVEN	Steve Israel (D) (retiring)	54.8% D	Lean D	Lean D	Likely D	Lean D	Likely D	Thomas Suozzi (D)
New York 19	D+1	Chris Gibson (R) (retiring)	64.5% R	Tossup	Tossup	Lean R	Tossup	Tossup	John Faso (R)
New York 21	EVEN	Elise Stefanik (R)	55.1% R	Likely R	Safe R	Likely R	Likely R	Likely R	Elise Stefanik (R)
New York 22	R+3	Richard L. Hanna (R) (retiring)	98.4% R	Lean R	Tossup	Lean R	Tossup	Tossup	Claudia Tenney (R)
New York 23	R+3	Tom Reed (R)	61.7% R	Likely R	Safe R	Likely R	Lean R	Likely R	Tom Reed (R)
New York 24	D+5	John Katko (R)	59.5% R	Likely R	Likely R	Lean R	Tossup	Lean R	John Katko (R)
New York 25	D+7	Louise Slaughter (D)	50.2% D	Likely D	Safe D	Safe D	Likely D	Safe D	Louise Slaughter (D)
North Carolina 6	R+10	Mark Walker (R)	58.7% R	Safe R	Safe R	Safe R	Likely R	Safe R	Mark Walker (R)
North Carolina 8	R+8	Richard Hudson (R)	64.9% R	Safe R	Safe R	Safe R	Likely R	Safe R	Richard Hudson (R)
North Carolina 9	R+8	Robert Pittenger (R)	93.9% R	Safe R	Safe R	Safe R	Likely R	Safe R	Robert Pittenger (R)
North Carolina 13	R+5	George Holding (R) (switching seats) (Note: Contested the new 2nd and won.)	57.3% R	Safe R	Safe R	Safe R	Likely R	Safe R	Ted Budd (R)
Pennsylvania 6	R+2	Ryan Costello (R)	56.3% R	Likely R	Safe R	Safe R	Likely R	Safe R	Ryan Costello (R)
Pennsylvania 8	R+1	Mike Fitzpatrick (R) (retiring)	61.9% R	Tossup	Tossup	Lean R	Tossup	Tossup	Brian Fitzpatrick (R)
Pennsylvania 16	R+4	Joe Pitts (R) (retiring)	57.7% R	Lean R	Safe R	Lean R	Likely R	Likely R	Lloyd Smucker (R)
Pennsylvania 17	D+4	Matt Cartwright (D)	56.8% D	Safe D	Safe D	Safe D	Likely D	Safe D	Matt Cartwright (D)
Texas 10	R+11	Michael McCaul (R)	62.2% R	Safe R	Safe R	Safe R	Likely R	Safe R	Michael McCaul (R)
Texas 14	R+12	Randy Weber (R)	61.8% R	Safe R	Safe R	Safe R	Likely R	Safe R	Randy Weber (R)
Texas 23	R+3	Will Hurd (R)	49.8% R	Tossup	Tossup	Lean D (flip)	Tossup	Tossup	Will Hurd (R)
Utah 4	R+16	Mia Love (R)	50.9% R	Lean R	Likely R	Lean R	Tossup	Likely R	Mia Love (R)
Virginia 4	D+8	Randy Forbes (R) (switching seats) (Note: Contested the new 2nd and lost in the primaries.)	60.2% R	Likely D (flip)	Safe D (flip)	Safe D (flip)	Likely D (flip)	Safe D (flip)	Donald McEachin (D)
Virginia 5	R+5	Robert Hurt (R) (retiring)	60.9% R	Likely R	Likely R	Lean R	Likely R	Likely R	Thomas Garrett Jr. (R)
Virginia 7	R+8	Dave Brat (R)	60.8% R	Safe R	Safe R	Safe R	Likely R	Safe R	Dave Brat (R)
Virginia 10	R+2	Barbara Comstock (R)	56.5% R	Tossup	Tilt R	Lean R	Tossup	Tossup	Barbara Comstock (R)
Washington 3	R+2	Jaime Herrera Beutler (R)	61.5% R	Safe R	Safe R	Safe R	Likely R	Safe R	Jaime Herrera Beutler (R)
Washington 8	R+1	Dave Reichert (R)	60.2% R	Safe R	Safe R	Safe R	Likely R	Safe R	Dave Reichert (R)
Wisconsin 8	R+2	Reid Ribble (R) (retiring)	65.0% R	Likely R	Likely R	Lean R	Lean R	Lean R	Mike Gallagher (R)
Overall				R - 228; D - 189; 18 tossups	R - 231; D - 194; 10 tossups	R - 234; D - 201	R - 225; D - 190; 20 tossups	R - 225; D - 190; 20 tossups	R - 241; D - 194

=== Generic ballot polls ===
The following is a list of generic party ballot polls conducted in advance of the 2016 House of Representatives elections.

Polling aggregates
Source of poll aggregation	Date updated	Dates polled	Democratic	Republican	Lead
FiveThirtyEight	Nov 8, 2016	Until Nov 7, 2016	45.4%	44.2%	+1.2%
RealClearPolitics	Nov 8, 2016	Nov 1–7, 2016	46.0%	45.4%	+0.6%
Average			45.7%	44.8%	+0.9%
