= 2016 United States Senate election in Nevada =

- November 8, 2016
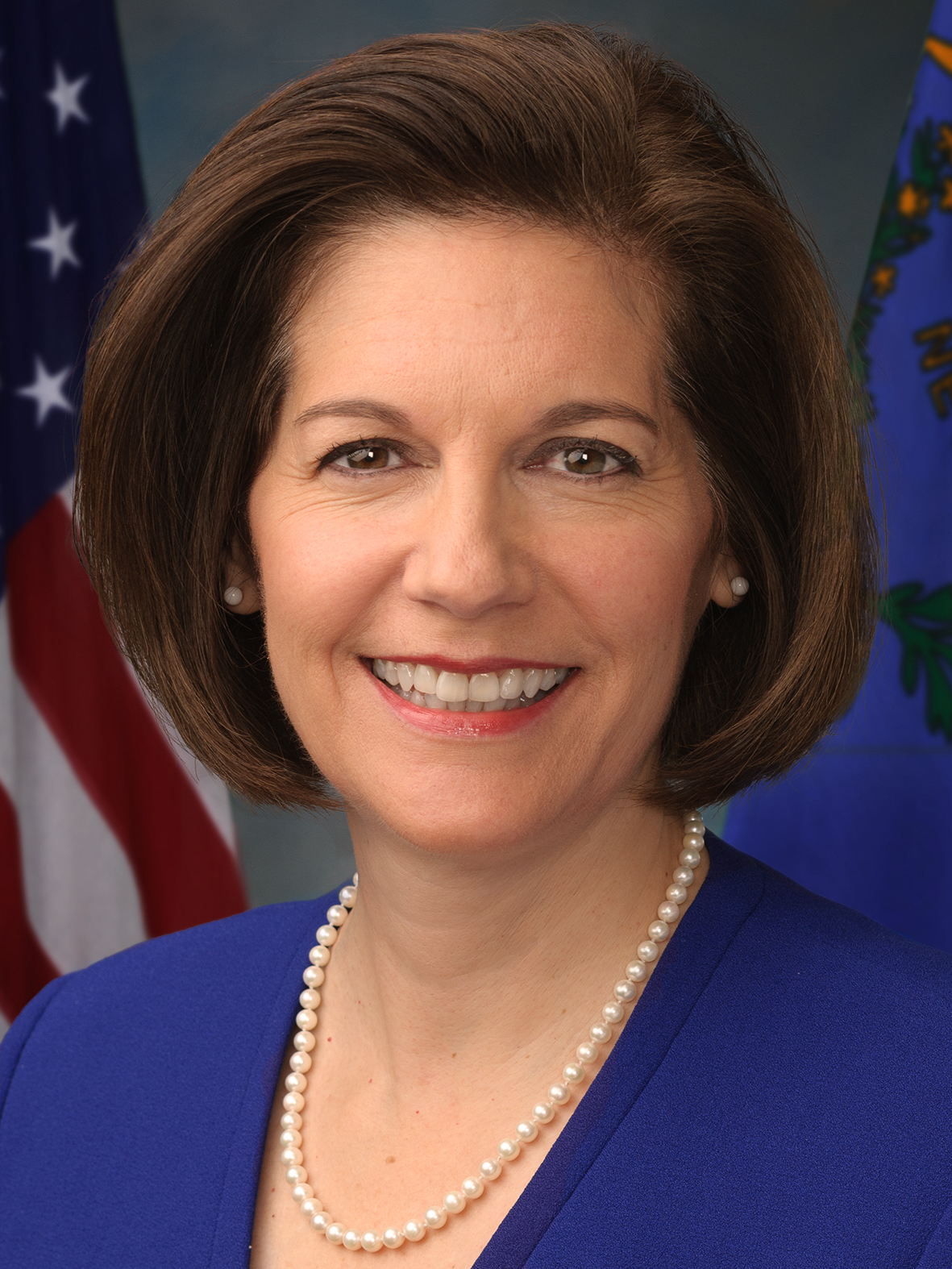

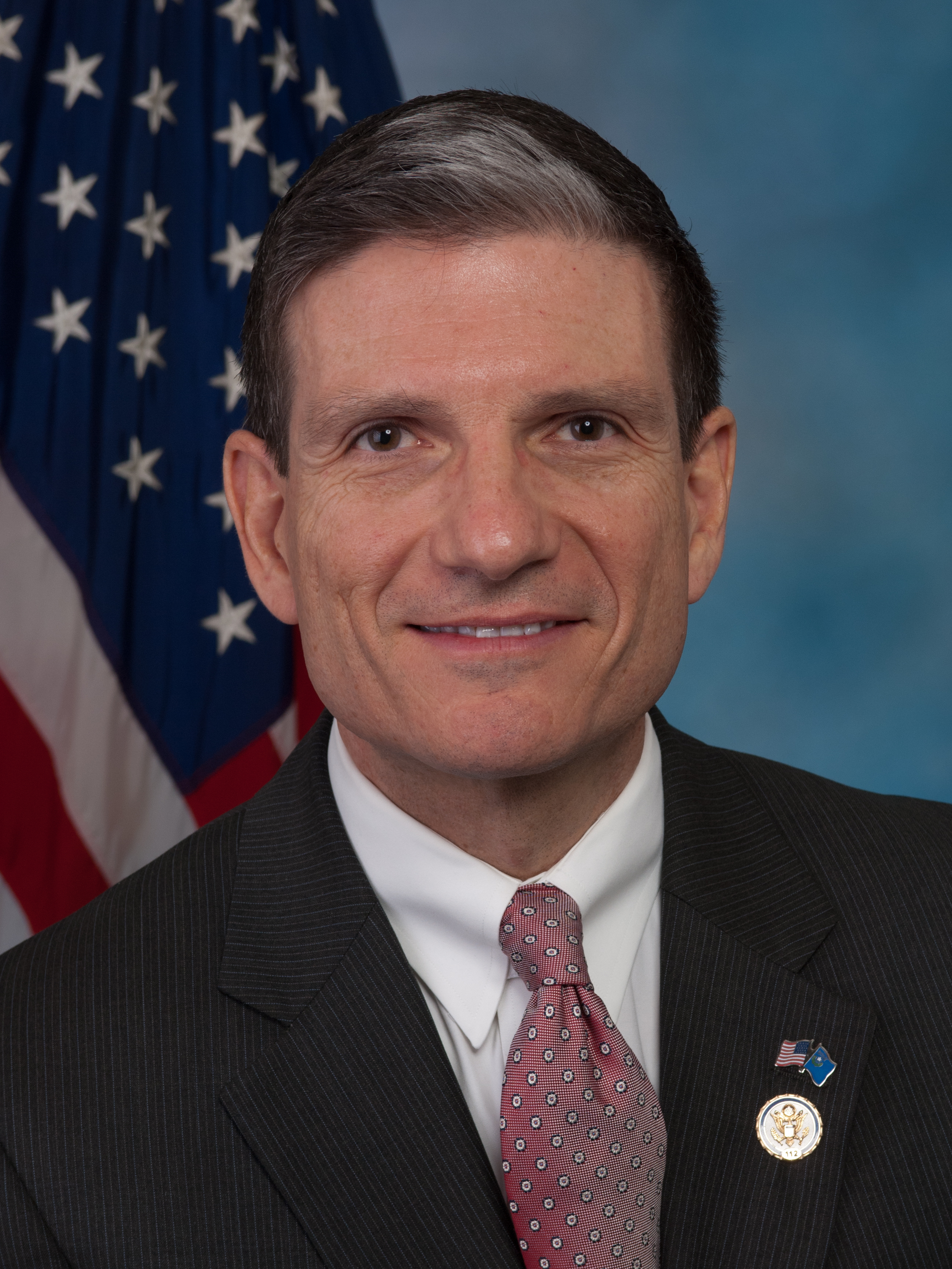
Nominee	Catherine Cortez Masto	Joe Heck
Party	Democratic	Republican
Popular vote	521,994	495,079
Percentage	47.10%	44.67%
- Cortez Masto: 40–50% 50–60% 60–70% 70–80% 80–90% >90% Heck: 40–50% 50–60% 60–70% 70–80% 80–90% >90% Tie: 40–50% 50% No votes
U.S. senator before election
Harry Reid
Democratic
Elected U.S. Senator
Catherine Cortez Masto
Democratic

The 2016 United States Senate election in Nevada was held November 8, 2016 to elect a member of the United States Senate to represent the State of Nevada, concurrently with the 2016 U.S. presidential election, as well as other elections to the United States Senate in other states and elections to the United States House of Representatives and various state and local elections. The state primary election was held June 14, 2016.

Incumbent Democratic Senator Harry Reid, the Senate Minority Leader and former Senate Majority Leader, initially said he would seek re-election to a sixth term, but announced on March 26, 2015, that he would retire instead. Democratic former State Attorney General Catherine Cortez Masto defeated Republican U.S. Representative Joe Heck in the general election on November 8, 2016. Heck won sixteen of the state's seventeen counties; however, since Cortez Masto won Clark County, which comprises nearly three-quarters of the state's population, she defeated Heck statewide by almost 27,000 votes, and became the first female and first Latina senator in Nevada's history. As of 2025, this would be the last time Washoe County voted for a Republican Senate candidate.

== Democratic primary ==
=== Candidates ===
==== Declared ====
- Catherine Cortez Masto, former Nevada Attorney General
- Bobby Mahendra
- Liddo Susan O'Briant, instructional assistant
- Allen Rheinhart, Black Lives Matter activist and candidate for governor in 2014

==== Withdrew ====
- Harry Reid, incumbent U.S. senator

==== Declined ====
- Shelley Berkley, former U.S. representative and nominee for the U.S. Senate in 2012
- Lucy Flores, former state assemblywoman and nominee for lieutenant governor in 2014 (lost primary for NV-04)
- Steven Horsford, former U.S. representative
- John Lee, Mayor of North Las Vegas, former state senator and candidate for NV-04 in 2012
- Kate Marshall, former state treasurer of Nevada, nominee for Nevada's 2nd congressional district in 2011 and nominee for Secretary of State of Nevada in 2014
- Ross Miller, former secretary of state of Nevada and nominee for Nevada Attorney General in 2014
- Rory Reid, former Clark County Commissioner, nominee for governor in 2010 and son of U.S. Senator Harry Reid
- Steve Sisolak, chairman of the Clark County Commission
- Dina Titus, U.S. representative and nominee for Governor of Nevada in 2006 (running for re-election)

=== Democratic endorsements ===
Catherine Cortez Masto

U.S. presidents

- Barack Obama, 44th president of the United States

U.S. vice presidents

- Joe Biden, 47th vice president of the United States

U.S. Cabinet members and Cabinet-level officials

- Hillary Clinton, 67th United States Secretary of State, 2008 presidential candidate and 2016 presidential nominee

U.S. senators

- Barbara Boxer, California
- Sherrod Brown, Ohio
- Richard Bryan, Nevada (former; also former governor of Nevada)
- Kirsten Gillibrand, New York
- Gary Peters, Michigan
- Harry Reid, Nevada
- Bernie Sanders, Vermont and 2016 presidential candidate
- Elizabeth Warren, Massachusetts

Statewide officials

- Frankie Sue Del Papa, former attorney general of Nevada and former secretary of state of Nevada
- Kate Marshall, former state treasurer of Nevada, nominee for Nevada's 2nd congressional district in 2011 and nominee for Secretary of State of Nevada in 2014
- Ross Miller, former secretary of state of Nevada and nominee for Nevada Attorney General in 2014

State legislators

- Barbara Buckley, former Speaker of the Nevada Assembly

Organizations

- Bend the Arc Jewish Action PAC
- Daily Kos
- Democracy for America
- Democratic Senatorial Campaign Committee
- EMILY's List
- Human Rights Campaign
- League of Conservation Voters
- Nevada Association of Public Safety Officers, Peace Officers Research of Nevada, the Fraternal Order of Police and the Southern Nevada Conference of Police and Sheriffs
- NRDC Action Fund
- Planned Parenthood

=== Results ===
Results by county: Cortez Masto—80–90% Cortez Masto—70–80% Cortez Masto—60–70% Cortez Masto—50–60% Cortez Masto—<40%

Democratic primary results
Party	Candidate	Votes	%
Democratic	Catherine Cortez Masto	81,944	81.0%
Democratic	Allen Rheinhart	5,645	6.0%
Democratic	None of these candidates	5,498	5.0%
Democratic	Liddo Susan O'Briant	4,834	5.0%
Democratic	Bobby Mahendra	3,760	3.0%
Total votes		101,681	100.0%

== Republican primary ==
=== Candidates ===
==== Declared ====
- Sharron Angle, former state assemblywoman, nominee for this seat in 2010 and candidate for NV-02 in 2006
- D'Nese Davis, artist and teacher
- Eddie Hamilton, retired auto executive and perennial candidate
- Joe Heck, U.S. representative
- Thomas "Sad Tom" Heck, retired air force officer
- Robert Leeds, author, retired Merchant Marine and perennial candidate
- Carlo "Mazunga" Poliak, retired sanitation worker and perennial candidate
- Juston Preble, sales consultant
- Bill Tarbell, retired minister and candidate for governor in 2014

==== Withdrawn ====
- Bob Beers, Las Vegas City Councilman, former state senator and candidate for governor in 2006

==== Declined ====
- Mark Amodei, U.S. representative (running for re-election)
- Greg Brower, state senator and former United States Attorney for the District of Nevada
- Barbara Cegavske, Secretary of State of Nevada, former state senator and candidate for NV-04 in 2012
- Heidi Gansert, former state assemblywoman and former chief of staff to Governor Brian Sandoval
- Cresent Hardy, U.S. representative (lost re-election to NV-04)
- Steve Hill, executive director of the Nevada Governor's Office of Economic Development
- Mark Hutchison, Lieutenant Governor of Nevada and former state senator
- Ron Knecht, Nevada State Controller, former regent of the University of Nevada, Reno and former state assemblyman
- Brian Krolicki, former lieutenant governor of Nevada
- Adam Laxalt, Nevada Attorney General
- Michael Roberson, Majority Leader of the Nevada Senate (running for NV-03)
- Wayne Allyn Root, former member of the Libertarian National Committee and Libertarian Party nominee for Vice President of the United States in 2008
- Brian Sandoval, Governor of Nevada
- Dan Schwartz, state treasurer and candidate for NV-04 in 2012

=== Endorsements ===
Joe Heck

U.S. presidents

- George W. Bush, 43rd president of the United States

U.S. senators

- Dean Heller, Nevada
- Mitch McConnell, Kentucky and Senate Majority Leader

U.S. representatives

- Mark Amodei, Nevada
- Cresent Hardy, Nevada

Mayors

- Carolyn Goodman, Las Vegas

Individuals

- John R. Bolton, former United States Ambassador to the United Nations
- Carly Fiorina, former CEO of Hewlett-Packard, 2010 nominee for Senate in California and 2016 presidential candidate

=== Polling ===
Poll source	Date(s) administered	Sample size	Margin of error	Joe Heck	Sharron Angle	Other	Undecided
Public Opinion Strategies	March 28–30, 2016	500	± 4.38%	67%	11%	3%	17%

=== Results ===
Results by county: Heck—70–80% Heck—60–70% Heck—50–60% Heck—40–50%

Republican primary results
Party	Candidate	Votes	%
Republican	Joe Heck	74,517	65.0%
Republican	Sharron Angle	26,142	23.0%
Republican	None of these candidates	3,902	3.0%
Republican	Thomas Heck	3,570	3.0%
Republican	Eddie Hamilton	2,507	2.0%
Republican	D'Nese Davis	1,937	1.8%
Republican	Bill Tarbell	1,179	1.0%
Republican	Robert Leeds	662	0.6%
Republican	Juston Preble	582	0.5%
Republican	Carlo Poliak	279	0.2%
Total votes		114,827	100.0%

== Independent American primary ==
=== Candidates ===
==== Declared ====
- Tom Jones, retired businessman and perennial candidate

== Libertarian primary ==
=== Candidates ===
==== Declined ====
- Dennis Hof, owner of the Moonlite Bunny Ranch (running for the State Senate)

== Independents ==
=== Candidates ===
==== Declared ====
- Tony Gumina, physician and businessman
- Tom Sawyer, retired railroad worker
- G.A. Villa (not on final ballot)
- Jarrod M. Williams, veteran

== General election ==
=== Debates ===
Dates	Location	Cortez Masto	Heck	Link
October 14, 2016	North Las Vegas, Nevada	Participant	Participant	

=== Predictions ===
Source	Ranking	As of
The Cook Political Report	Tossup	November 2, 2016
Sabato's Crystal Ball	Lean D	November 7, 2016
Rothenberg Political Report	Tossup	November 3, 2016
Daily Kos	Lean D	November 8, 2016
Real Clear Politics	Tossup	November 7, 2016

=== Polling ===
Poll source	Date(s) administered	Sample size (Note: Key: A – all adults RV – registered voters LV – likely voters V – unclear)	Margin of error	Catherine Cortez Masto (D)	Joe Heck (R)	None of These Candidates	Other	Undecided
SurveyMonkey	November 1–7, 2016	1,207 (LV)	± 4.6%	50%	45%	—	—	5%
Gravis Marketing	November 3–6, 2016	1,158 (LV)	± 2.9%	49%	43%	—	—	8%
SurveyMonkey	October 31 – November 6, 2016	1,124 (LV)	± 4.6%	49%	46%	—	—	5%
Emerson College	November 4–5, 2016	600 (LV)	± 3.9%	48%	47%	–	3% (Note: "Someone else" with 3%)	1%
SurveyMonkey	October 28 – November 3, 2016	1,016 (LV)	± 4.6%	49%	46%	—	—	5%
SurveyMonkey	October 27 – November 2, 2016	937 (LV)	± 4.6%	48%	47%	—	—	5%
Public Policy Polling (D)	October 31 – November 1, 2016	688 (LV)	± 3.7%	47%	44%	—	—	9%
JMC Analytics & Polling (R) (Note: Poll conducted for 8 News NOW.)	October 28 – November 1, 2016	600 (LV)	± 4.0%	45%	43%	3%	1%	7%
The Times Picayune/Lucid	October 28 – November 1, 2016	892 (LV)	± 3.0%	47%	41%	—	—	13%
CNN/ORC	October 27 – November 1, 2016	790 (LV)	± 3.5%	47%	49%	—	3% (Note: "Neither" with 3%)	1%
CNN/ORC	October 27 – November 1, 2016	860 (RV)	± 3.5%	47%	48%	—	4% (Note: "Neither" with 4%)	1%
SurveyMonkey	October 26 – November 1, 2016	994 (LV)	± 4.6%	47%	47%	—	—	6%
SurveyMonkey	October 25–31, 2016	1,010 (LV)	± 4.6%	47%	47%	—	—	6%
Emerson College	October 26–27, 2016	550 (LV)	± 4.1%	44%	48%	–	3% (Note: "Someone else" with 3%)	6%
Gravis Marketing (R) (Note: Poll conducted for Breitbart News Network, a far-right news outlet.)	October 25, 2016	875 (RV)	± 3.3%	50%	44%	—	—	6%
Marist College	October 20–24, 2016	707 (LV)	± 3.7%	42%	49%	–	4%	5%
Marist College	October 20–24, 2016	985 (RV)	± 3.1%	42%	47%	–	4%	6%
Bendixen & Amandi International (Note: Poll conducted for the Las Vegas Review-Journal.)	October 20–23, 2016	800 (LV)	± 3.5%	45%	44%	–	2%	9%
Rasmussen Reports (R) (Note: Poll conducted for KTNV-TV.)	October 20–22, 2016	826 (LV)	± 3.5%	43%	41%	–	7% (Note: "Some other candidate" with 7%)	8%
Monmouth University	October 14–17, 2016	413 (LV)	± 4.8%	42%	45%	5%	4% (Note: Jones (IA) with 4%)	4%
CNN/ORC	October 10–15, 2016	698 (LV)	± 3.5%	52%	45%	—	2% (Note: "Neither" with 2%)	1%
CNN/ORC	October 10–15, 2016	862 (RV)	± 3.5%	50%	44%	—	4% (Note: "Neither" with 4%)	2%
CBS News/YouGov	October 12–14, 2016	996 (LV)	± 4.5%	39%	39%	–	4% (Note: "Someone else" with 4%)	18%
JMC Analytics & Polling (R)	October 10–13, 2016	600 (LV)	± 4.0%	40%	35%	4%	6% (Note: Jones (IA) with 3%; Gumina (I) with 2%; Sawyer (I) with 1%; Williams (I) with <1%)	16%
Public Opinion Strategies (R) (Note: Poll conducted for the Senate Leadership Fund, a Super PAC dedicated to electing a Republican majority in the U.S. Senate.)	October 11–12, 2016	600 (RV)	± 4.0%	44%	47%	2%	2% (Note: "Refused" with 2%)	5%
Clarity Campaign Labs (D) (Note: Poll conducted for End Citizens United.)	October 10–11, 2016	1,010 (LV)	± 3.1%	41%	40%	–	8% (Note: "Other/None" with 8%)	11%
Public Policy Polling (D) (Note: Poll conducted for Cortez Masto's campaign.)	October 10–11, 2016	986 (LV)	± 3.1%	43%	39%	—	—	18%
Emerson College	October 2–4, 2016	700 (LV)	± 3.6%	41%	45%	–	7%	7%
Hart Research Associates (D)	September 27 – October 2, 2016	700 (LV)	± 3.2%	46%	47%	—	—	7%
Bendixen & Amandi International	September 27–29, 2016	800 (LV)	± 3.5%	45%	47%	—	—	8%
Suffolk University	September 27–29, 2016	500 (LV)	± 4.4%	35%	38%	4%	5% (Note: "Refused" with 2%; Gumina (I) with 1%; Jones (IA) with 1%; Sawyer (I) with 1%; Williams (I) with <1%)	18%
Fox News	September 18–20, 2016	704 (LV)	± 3.5%	36%	43%	5%	7%	8%
Fox News	September 18–20, 2016	805 (RV)	± 3.5%	34%	41%	8%	7%	10%
Rasmussen Reports (R)	September 16–18, 2016	800 (LV)	± 4.0%	40%	44%	–	6% (Note: "Some other candidate" with 6%)	11%
Insights West	September 12–14, 2016	398 (LV)	± 4.9%	39%	43%	—	4% (Note: "Some other candidate" with 4%)	14%
Monmouth University	September 11–13, 2016	406 (LV)	± 4.9%	43%	46%	3%	4% (Note: Jones (IA) with 4%)	4%
GQR Research (D)	September 6–8, 2016	600 (LV)	± 4.0%	49%	47%	—	—	4%
Marist College	September 6–8, 2016	627 (LV)	± 3.9%	45%	47%	–	1%	7%
Marist College	September 6–8, 2016	915 (RV)	± 3.2%	46%	45%	–	1%	8%
Public Policy Polling (D)	September 6–7, 2016	815 (LV)	± 3.4%	42%	41%	—	—	16%
Suffolk University	August 15–17, 2016	500 (LV)	± 4.4%	37%	37%	6%	6% (Note: "Refused" with 3%; Gumina (I) with 1%; Jones (IA) with 1%; Sawyer (I) with 1%)	14%
CBS News/YouGov	August 2–5, 2016	993 (LV)	± 4.6%	35%	38%	—	4% (Note: "Someone else" with 4%)	23%
Rasmussen Reports (R)	July 29–31, 2016	750 (LV)	± 4.0%	41%	42%	–	6% (Note: "Some other candidate" with 6%)	11%
Rasmussen Reports (R)	July 22–24, 2016	750 (LV)	± 4.0%	37%	46%	–	5% (Note: "Some other candidate" with 5%)	12%
Monmouth University	July 7–10, 2016	408 (LV)	± 4.9%	40%	42%	6%	6% (Note: Jones (IA) with 5%; "Other" with 1%)	7%
GQR Research (D) (Note: Poll conducted for Democracy Corps, a non-profit organization associated with the Democratic Party.)	June 11–20, 2016	300 (LV)	± 5.7%	41%	46%	—	—	–
Gravis Marketing	May 24–25, 2016	1,637 (RV)	± 2.0%	45%	43%	—	—	12%
Gravis Marketing	February 14–15, 2016	1,366 (LV)	± 3.0%	41%	44%	–	—	15%
Gravis Marketing	December 23–27, 2015	909 (LV)	± 3.0%	37%	47%	–	–	16%
Public Policy Polling (D)	July 13–14, 2015	677 (V)	± 3.8%	42%	41%	—	—	–

Hypothetical polling

with Harry Reid

Poll source	Date(s) administered	Sample size	Margin of error	Harry Reid (D)	Brian Krolicki (R)	Other	Undecided
Gravis Marketing	February 21–22, 2015	955	± 3%	45%	46%	—	8%

Poll source	Date(s) administered	Sample size	Margin of error	Harry Reid (D)	Adam Laxalt (R)	Other	Undecided
Gravis Marketing	February 21–22, 2015	955	± 3%	46%	48%	—	6%

Poll source	Date(s) administered	Sample size	Margin of error	Harry Reid (D)	Brian Sandoval (R)	Other	Undecided
Harper Polling	July 26–29, 2014	602	± 3.99%	43%	53%	—	4%

with Dina Titus

Poll source	Date(s) administered	Sample size	Margin of error	Dina Titus (D)	Sharron Angle (R)	Other	Undecided
Gravis Marketing	March 27, 2015	850	± 3%	54%	31%	—	14%

Poll source	Date(s) administered	Sample size	Margin of error	Dina Titus (D)	Adam Laxalt (R)	Other	Undecided
Gravis Marketing	March 27, 2015	850	± 3%	46%	44%	—	10%

Poll source	Date(s) administered	Sample size	Margin of error	Dina Titus (D)	Michael Roberson (R)	Other	Undecided
Gravis Marketing	March 27, 2015	850	± 3%	48%	41%	—	12%

Poll source	Date(s) administered	Sample size	Margin of error	Dina Titus (D)	Brian Sandoval (R)	Other	Undecided
Gravis Marketing	March 27, 2015	850	± 3%	37%	55%	—	8%

with Catherine Cortez Masto

Poll source	Date(s) administered	Sample size	Margin of error	Catherine Cortez Masto (D)	Sharron Angle (R)	Other	Undecided
Gravis Marketing	February 14–15, 2016	1,366	± 3%	46%	33%	—	21%
Gravis Marketing	December 23–27, 2015	909	± 3%	45%	32%	—	22%
Gravis Marketing	March 27, 2015	850	± 3%	53%	30%	—	17%

Poll source	Date(s) administered	Sample size	Margin of error	Catherine Cortez Masto (D)	Adam Laxalt (R)	Other	Undecided
Gravis Marketing	March 27, 2015	850	± 3%	44%	39%	—	17%

Poll source	Date(s) administered	Sample size	Margin of error	Catherine Cortez Masto (D)	Michael Roberson (R)	Other	Undecided
Gravis Marketing	March 27, 2015	850	± 3%	47%	35%	—	19%

Poll source	Date(s) administered	Sample size	Margin of error	Catherine Cortez Masto (D)	Brian Sandoval (R)	Other	Undecided
Gravis Marketing	March 27, 2015	850	± 3%	37%	53%	—	10%

=== Results ===
Cortez Masto won her bid to succeed Harry Reid 47% to 45%, or by 2.43%, running 0.01% better than Hillary Clinton.

United States Senate election in Nevada, 2016
Party	Candidate	Votes	%	±%
Democratic	Catherine Cortez Masto	521,994	47.10%	−3.19%
Republican	Joe Heck	495,079	44.67%	+0.12%
None of These Candidates		42,257	3.81%	+1.56%
Independent American	Tom Jones	17,128	1.55%	+1.11%
Independent	Thomas Sawyer	14,208	1.28%	N/A
Independent	Tony Gumina	10,740	0.97%	N/A
Independent	Jarrod Williams	6,888	0.62%	N/A
Total votes		1,108,294	100.0%	N/A
Democratic hold				

==== By county ====
County	Catherine Cortez Masto Democratic		Joe Heck Republican		None of these Candidates		Tom Jones Independent American		Thomas Sawyer Independent		Tony Gumina Independent		Jarrod Williams Independent		Margin		Total votes cast
County	#	%	#	%	#	%	#	%	#	%	#	%	#	%	#	%	Total votes cast
Carson City	9,741	39.24%	13,027	52.47%	895	3.61%	448	1.80%	358	1.44%	201	0.81%	156	0.63%	-3,286	-13.23%	24,826
Churchill	2,240	20.56%	7,711	70.78%	352	3.23%	246	2.26%	192	1.76%	95	0.87%	58	0.53%	-5,471	-50.22%	10,894
Clark	386,179	51.27%	303,734	40.32%	29,849	3.96%	11,307	1.50%	9,359	1.24%	7,985	1.06%	4,830	0.64%	82,445	10.95%	753,243
Douglas	8,410	30.42%	17,587	63.6%	767	2.77%	350	1.27%	282	1.02%	153	0.55%	101	0.37%	-9,177	-33.19%	27,650
Elko	3,199	17.42%	13,462	73.29%	723	3.94%	394	3.1%	360	1.96%	135	0.74%	94	0.51%	-10,263	-55.88%	18,367
Esmeralda	66	15.71%	312	74.29%	13	3.1%	22	5.24%	3	0.71%	4	0.95%	0	0.00%	-246	-58.57%	420
Eureka	88	10.36%	692	81.51%	29	3.42%	16	1.88%	16	1.88%	5	0.59%	3	0.35%	-604	-71.14%	849
Humboldt	1,406	20.57%	4,397	64.34%	235	3.44%	127	1.86%	126	1.84%	62	0.91%	31	0.45%	-2,991	-43.77%	6,834
Lander	417	18.29%	1,704	74.74%	113	4.96%	54	2.37%	49	2.15%	23	1.01%	33	1.45%	-1,287	-56.45%	2,280
Lincoln	315	14.85%	1,609	75.86%	91	4.29%	51	2.40%	27	1.27%	20	0.94%	8	0.38%	-1,294	-61.01%	2,121
Lyon	6,323	26.82%	15,231	64.60%	780	3.31%	534	2.26%	375	1.59%	216	0.92%	119	0.50%	-8,908	-37.78%	23,578
Mineral	627	31.54%	1,141	57.39%	89	4.48%	47	2.36%	45	2.26%	20	1.01%	19	0.96%	-514	-25.85%	1,988
Nye	5,253	27.13%	11,611	59.97%	929	4.80%	747	3.86%	390	2.01%	248	1.28%	182	0.94%	-6,358	-32.84%	19,360
Pershing	466	23.63%	1,286	65.21%	77	3.90%	67	3.40%	45	2.28%	19	0.96%	12	0.61%	-800	-41.58%	1,972
Storey	791	31.10%	1,551	60.99%	83	3.26%	58	2.28%	34	1.34%	19	0.75%	7	0.28%	-760	-29.89%	2,543
Washoe	95,750	46.04%	97,433	46.85%	7,064	3.40%	2,553	1.23%	2,453	1.18%	1,506	0.72%	1,198	0.58%	-1,683	-0.81%	207,957
White Pine	723	19.29%	2,591	69.11%	168	4.48%	107	2.85%	94	2.51%	37	0.99%	29	0.77%	-1,868	-49.82%	3,749
Totals	521,994	47.10%	495,079	44.67%	42,257	3.81%	17,128	1.55%	14,208	1.28%	10,740	0.97%	6,888	0.62%	26,915	2.43%	1,108,294

Counties that flipped from Democratic to Republican

- Mineral (largest municipality: Hawthorne)
- Washoe (largest municipality: Reno)

==== By congressional district ====
Cortez Masto won two of four congressional districts, with the remaining two going to Heck, including one that elected a Democrat.

District	Cortez Masto	Heck	Representative
1st	60%	30%	Dina Titus
2nd	40%	53%	Mark Amodei
3rd	45%	47%	Joe Heck
3rd	45%	47%	Jacky Rosen
4th	49%	42%	Cresent Hardy
4th	49%	42%	Ruben Kihuen

== See also ==
- Freedom Partners Action Fund
- 2016 United States Senate elections
- 2016 United States House of Representatives elections in Nevada
- 2016 United States presidential election in Nevada

== Notes ==
Partisan clients
