= 2016 United States House of Representatives elections in Nevada =

- November 8, 2016

All 4 Nevada seats to the United States House of Representatives
	Majority party	Minority party
Party	Democratic	Republican
Last election	1	3
Seats won	3	1
Seat change	▲2	▼2
Popular vote	508,113	498,104
Percentage	47.11%	46.19%
Swing	▲8.41%	▼9.94%

Democratic hold Democratic gain
Republican hold
Democratic
40–50%
50–60%
60–70%
Republican
50–60%
60–70%
70–80%
80–90%

The 2016 United States House of Representatives elections in Nevada were held on November 8, 2016, to elect the four U.S. representatives from the state of Nevada, one from each of the state's four congressional districts. The elections coincided with the 2016 U.S. presidential election, as well as other elections to the House of Representatives, elections to the United States Senate and various state and local elections. The primaries took place on June 14.

== Overview ==
=== Statewide ===
Party	Candidates	Votes		Seats		
Party	Candidates	No.	%	No.	+/–	%
Democratic	4	508,113	47.11	3	▲2	75.00
Republican	4	498,104	46.19	1	▼2	25.00
Independent American	4	32,366	3.00	0	Steady	0.0
Independent	3	29,708	2.75	0	Steady	0.0
Libertarian	1	10,206	0.95	0	Steady	0.0
Total	16	1,078,497	100.0	4	Steady	100.0

Popular vote
Democratic	47.11%
Republican	46.19%
American Ind	3.00%
Libertarian	0.95%
Other	2.75%

House seats
Democratic	75.00%
Republican	25.00%

=== By district ===
Results of the 2016 United States House of Representatives elections in Nevada by district:

District	Democratic		Republican		Others		Total		Result
District	Votes	%	Votes	%	Votes	%	Votes	%	Result
District 1	116,537	61.87%	54,174	28.76%	17,641	9.37%	188,352	100.0%	Democratic hold
District 2	115,722	36.93%	182,676	58.30%	14,938	4.77%	313,336	100.0%	Republican Hold
District 3	146,869	47.23%	142,926	45.96%	21,168	6.81%	310,963	100.0%	Democratic gain
District 4	128,985	48.52%	118,328	44.51%	18,533	6.97%	265,846	100.0%	Democratic gain
Total	508,113	47.11%	498,104	46.19%	72,280	6.70%	1,078,497	100.0%	

== District 1 ==
2016 Nevada's 1st congressional district election
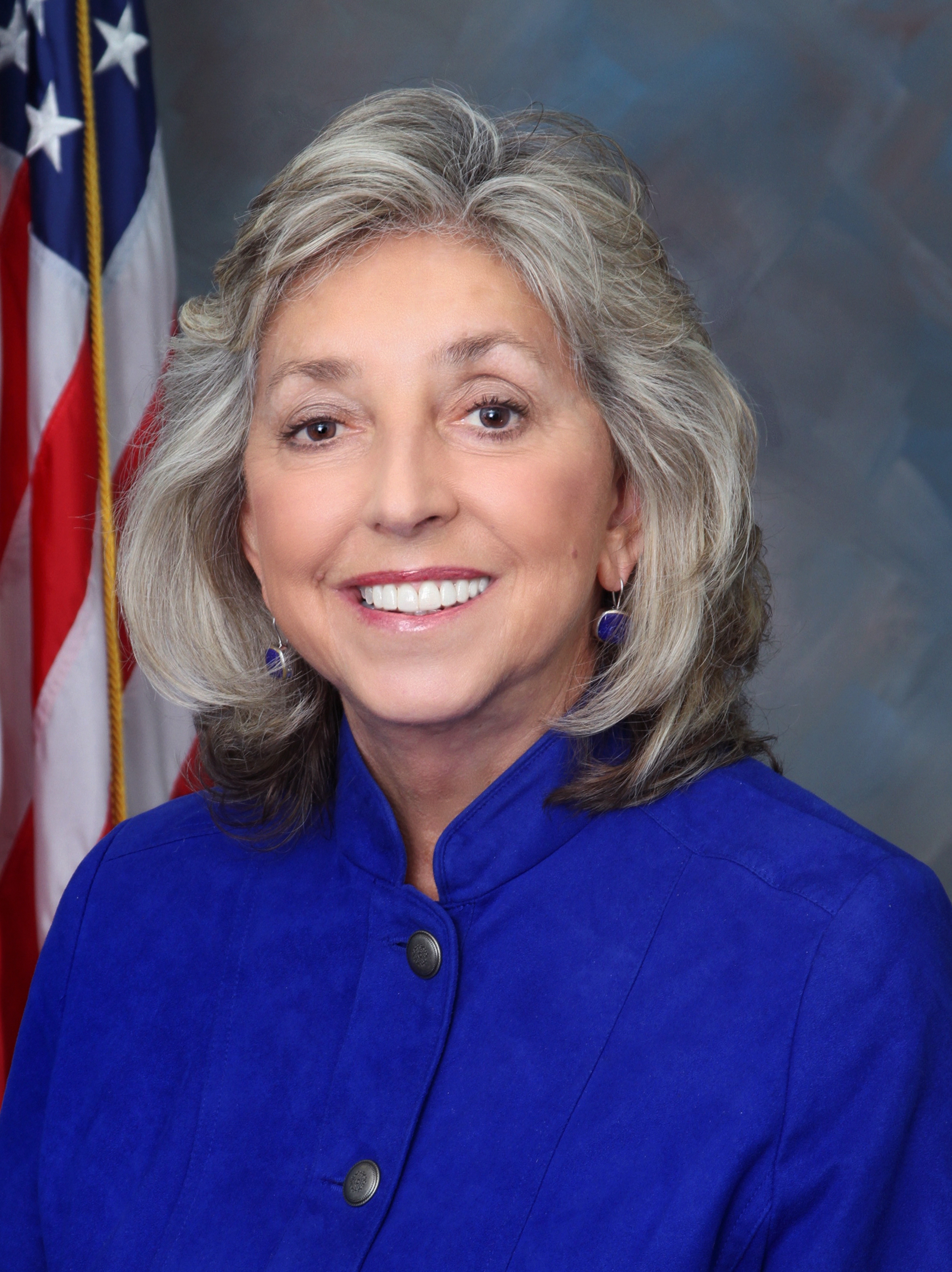

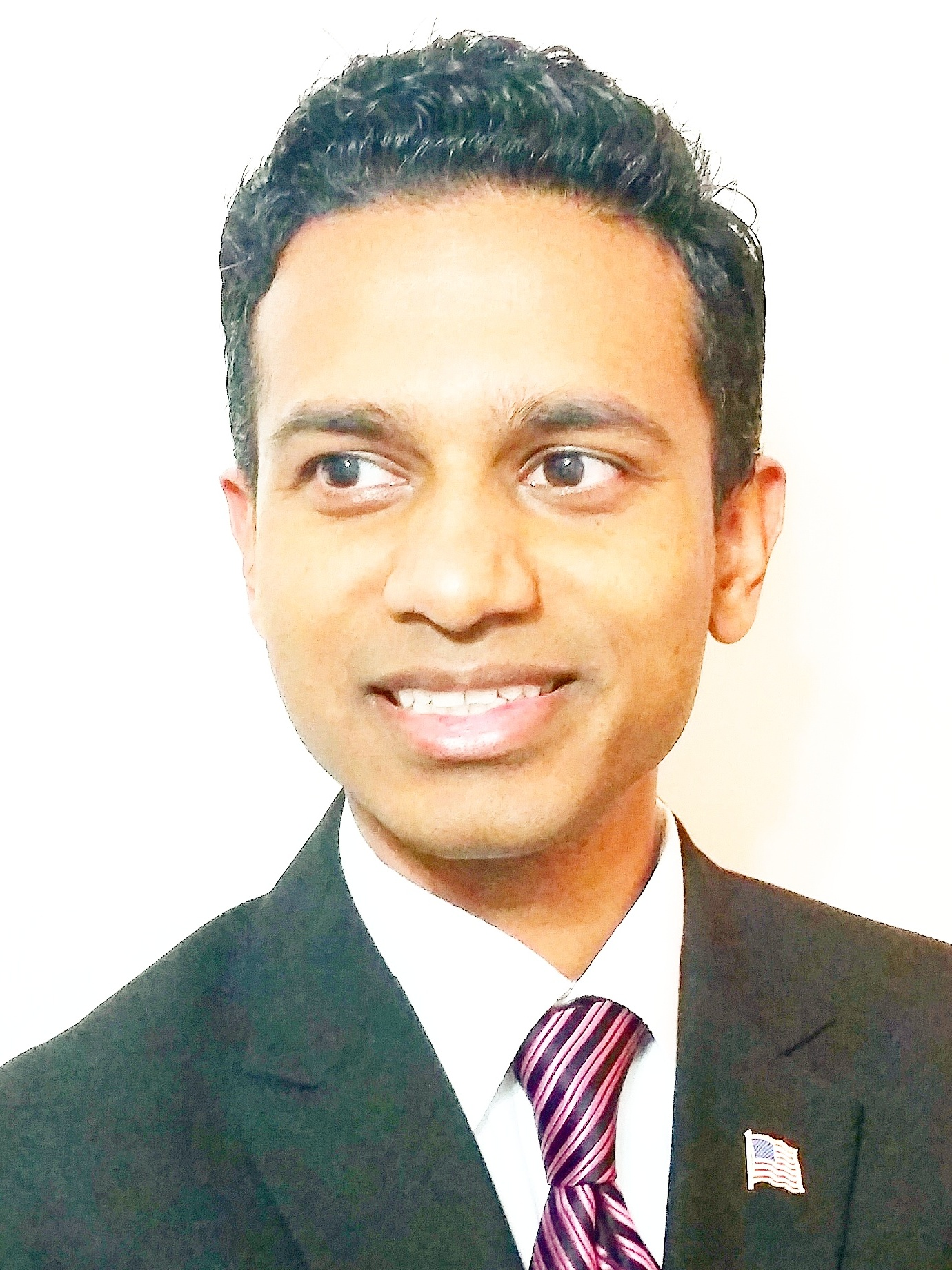
Nominee	Dina Titus	Mary Perry	Reuben D'Silva
Party	Democratic	Republican	Independent
Popular vote	116,537	54,174	13,897
Percentage	61.9%	28.8%	7.3%
- Titus: 40–50% 50–60% 60–70% 70–80% 80–90% >90% Perry: 40–50% 50–60% 60–70% No votes
U.S. Representative before election
Dina Titus
Democratic
Elected U.S. Representative
Dina Titus
Democratic

Nevada's 1st congressional district occupies the southeastern half of Nevada's largest city, Las Vegas, as well as parts of North Las Vegas and parts of unincorporated Clark County. The incumbent was Democrat Dina Titus, who has represented the 1st district since she won election in 2012. With incumbent Democratic senator Harry Reid not running for reelection, Titus was considering running for Senate. However, she decided to run for re-election.

=== Democratic primary ===
==== Candidates ====
===== Nominee =====
- Dina Titus, incumbent U.S. Representative

===== Eliminated in primary =====
- Patrick Boylan
- Jose Solorio

==== Results ====
Democratic primary results
Party	Candidate	Votes	%
Democratic	Dina Titus (incumbent)	15,556	82.4
Democratic	Jose Solorio	1,775	9.40
Democratic	Patrick Boylan	1,554	8.2
Total votes		18,885	100.0

=== Republican primary ===
Mary Perry, an attorney who ran for District Court Judge in 2014, was selected as the Republican nominee.

==== Candidates ====
===== Nominee =====
- Mary Perry, attorney

===== Eliminated in primary =====
- Louis Baker, candidate for state senate in 2014
- Stephanie Carlisle, businesswoman
- Freddy Horne, educator and Vietnam veteran
- Gary Johnston
- Jeff Miller, businessman

==== Results ====
Republican primary results
Party	Candidate	Votes	%
Republican	Mary Perry	2,588	25.0
Republican	Stephanie Carlisle	2,563	24.8
Republican	Fred Horne	1,911	18.5
Republican	Jeff Miller	1,459	14.1
Republican	Gary Johnston	1,144	11.1
Republican	Louis Baker	668	6.5
Total votes		10,333	100.0

=== Independents ===
==== Candidates ====
- Reuben D'Silva, teacher and former U.S. Marine

=== General election ===
==== Endorsements ====
Dina Titus (D)

Labor unions

- AFL-CIO

==== Predictions ====
Source	Ranking	As of
The Cook Political Report	Safe D	November 7, 2016
Daily Kos Elections	Safe D	November 7, 2016
Rothenberg	Safe D	November 3, 2016
Sabato's Crystal Ball	Safe D	November 7, 2016
RCP	Safe D	October 31, 2016

==== Results ====
Nevada's 1st congressional district, 2016
Party	Candidate	Votes	%
Democratic	Dina Titus (incumbent)	116,537	61.9
Republican	Mary Perry	54,174	28.8
Independent	Reuben D'Silva	13,897	7.3
Independent American	Kamau Bakari	3,744	2.0
Total votes		188,352	100.0
Democratic hold			

== District 2 ==
2016 Nevada's 2nd congressional district election
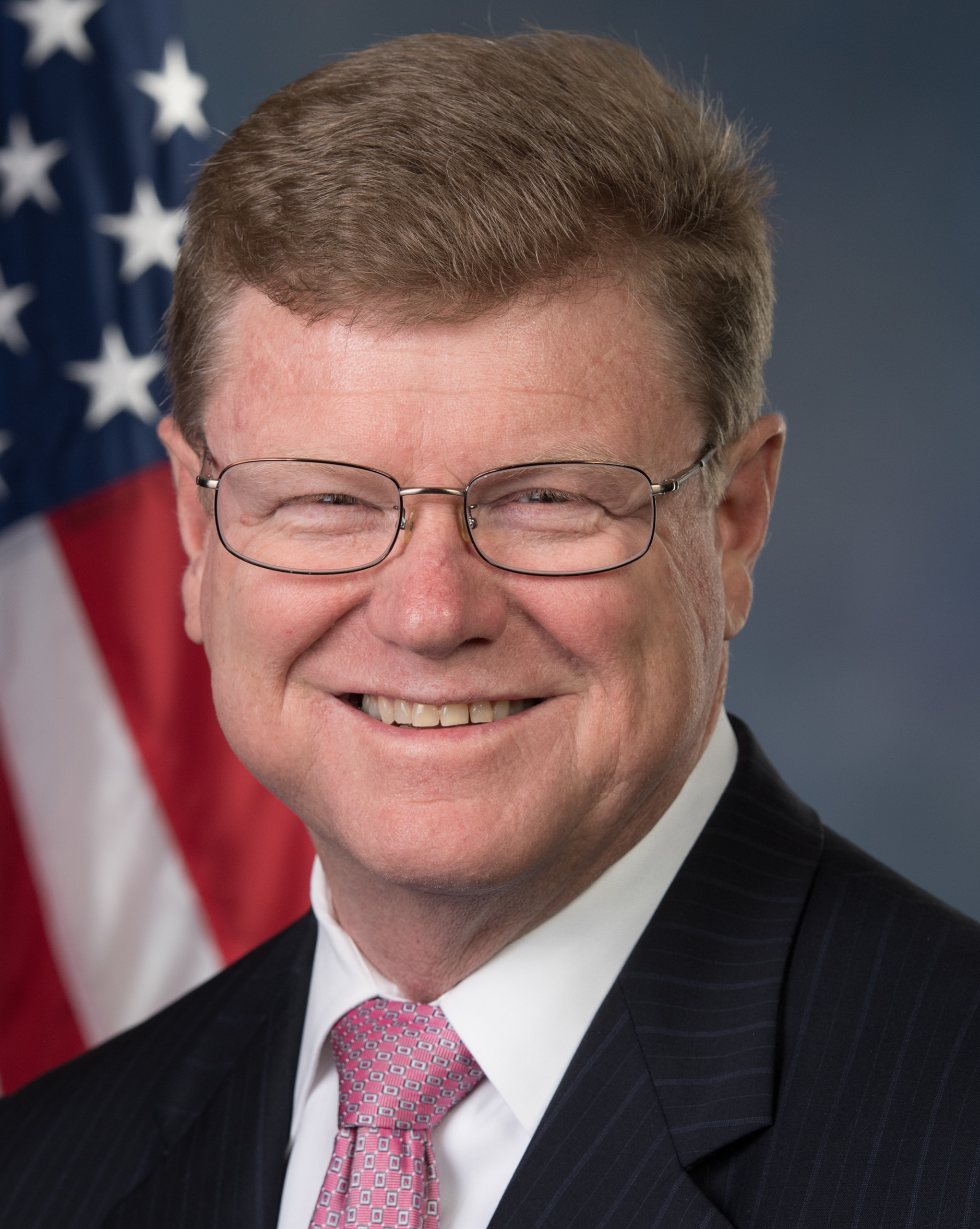

Nominee	Mark Amodei	Chip Evans
Party	Republican	Democratic
Popular vote	182,676	115,722
Percentage	58.3%	36.9%
- Precinct results Amodei: 40–50% 50–60% 60–70% 70–80% 80–90% >90% Evans: 40–50% 50–60% 60–70% 70–80% 80–90% Tie: 40–50% No votes
U.S. Representative before election
Mark Amodei
Republican
Elected U.S. Representative
Mark Amodei
Republican

Nevada's 2nd congressional district includes the northern third of the state. It includes most of Douglas and Lyon counties, all of Churchill, Elko, Eureka, Humboldt, Pershing and Washoe counties, as well as the state capital, Carson City. The largest city in the district is Reno, the state's second largest city. Although the district appears rural, its politics are dominated by Reno and Carson City, which combined cast over 85 percent of the district's vote. The incumbent was Republican Mark Amodei, who had represented the 2nd district since September 2011 following a special election upon the appointment of Dean Heller to the Senate. Amodei was mentioned as a potential candidate for the U.S. Senate, but denied having any interest. In May 2015 Amodei reiterated his commitment to running for re-election.

=== Republican primary ===
==== Candidates ====
===== Nominee =====
- Mark Amodei, incumbent U.S. Representative

=== Democratic primary ===
==== Candidates ====
===== Nominee =====
- Chip Evans, radio talk show host

===== Eliminated in primary =====
- Vance Alm, candidate for this seat in 2014
- Rick Shepherd, small business owner

==== Endorsements ====
Chip Evans

Labor unions

- AFL-CIO
Rick Shepherd

Labor unions

- American Federation of State, County and Municipal Employees

==== Results ====
Democratic primary results
Party	Candidate	Votes	%
Democratic	Chip Evans	11,333	45.1
Democratic	Rick Shepherd	8,983	35.8
Democratic	Vance Alm	4,803	19.1
Total votes		25,119	100.0

=== General election ===
==== Predictions ====
Source	Ranking	As of
The Cook Political Report	Safe R	November 7, 2016
Daily Kos Elections	Safe R	November 7, 2016
Rothenberg	Safe R	November 3, 2016
Sabato's Crystal Ball	Safe R	November 7, 2016
RCP	Safe R	October 31, 2016

==== Results ====
Nevada's 2nd congressional district, 2016
Party	Candidate	Votes	%
Republican	Mark Amodei (incumbent)	182,676	58.3
Democratic	Chip Evans	115,722	36.9
Independent American	John H. Everhart	8,693	2.8
Independent	Drew Knight	6,245	2.0
Total votes		313,336	100.0
Republican hold			

== District 3 ==
2016 Nevada's 3rd congressional district election
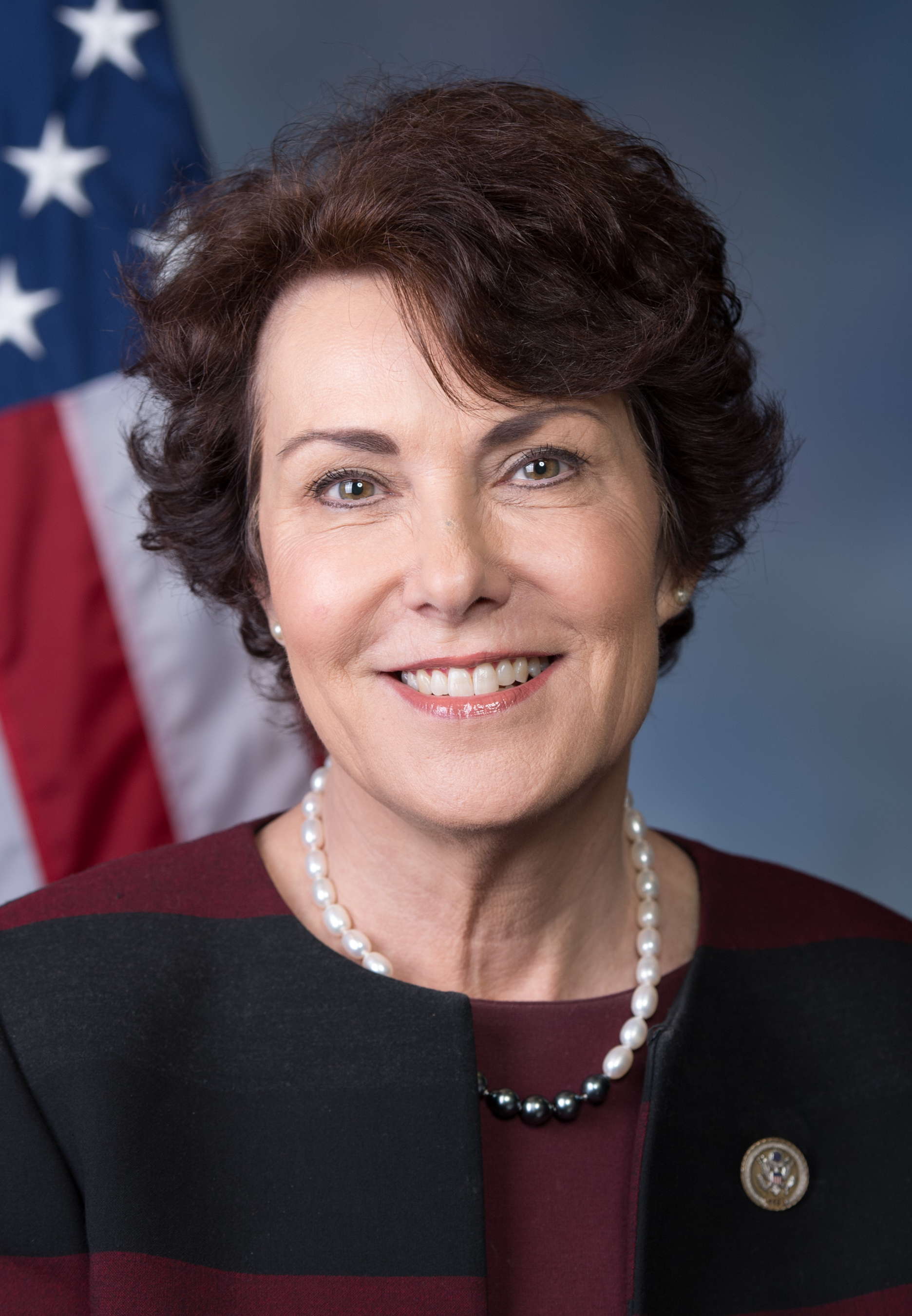

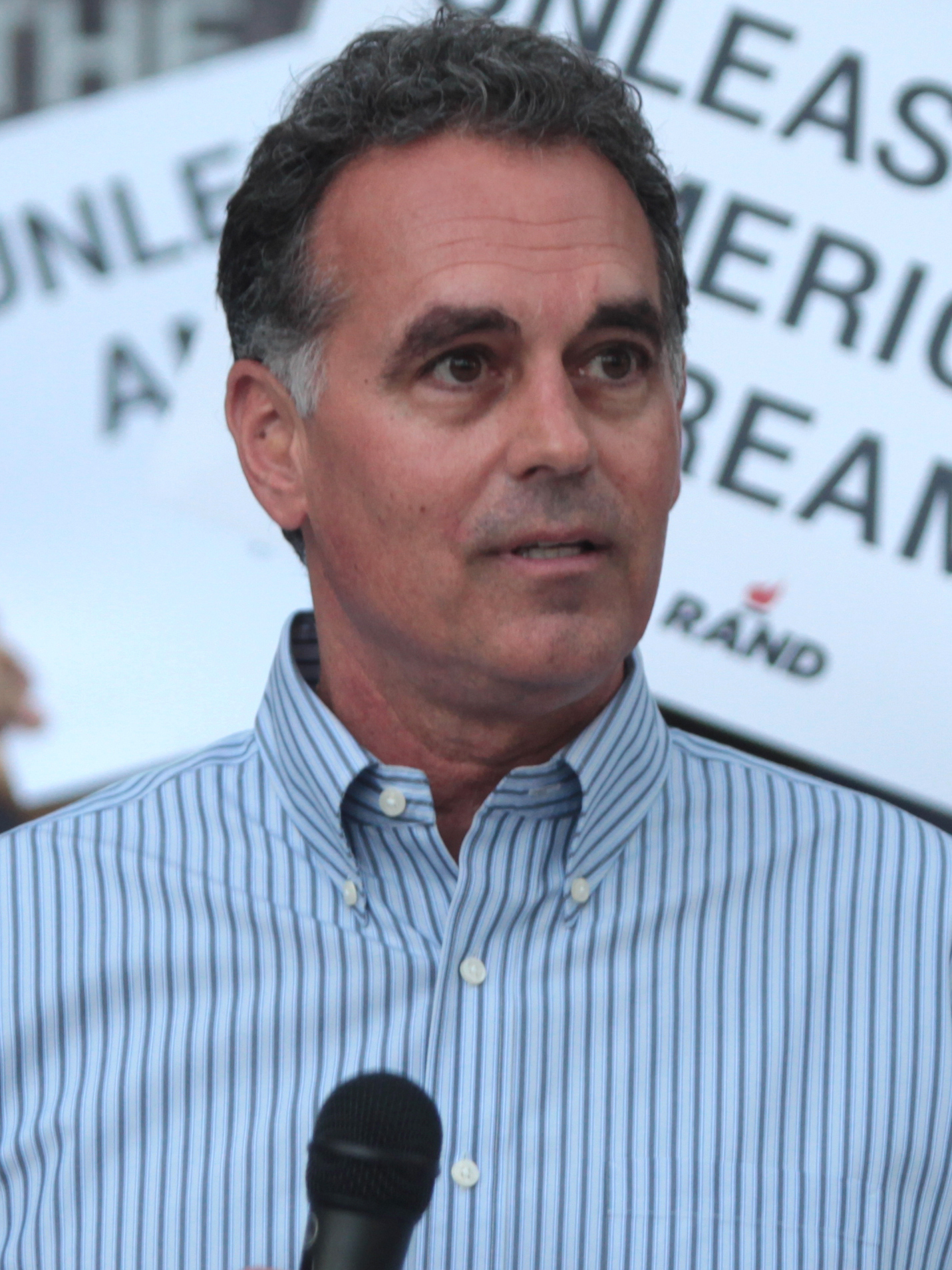
Nominee	Jacky Rosen	Danny Tarkanian
Party	Democratic	Republican
Popular vote	146,869	142,926
Percentage	47.2%	46.0%
- Rosen: 40–50% 50–60% 60–70% Tarkanian: 40–50% 50–60% 60–70% 70–80% Tie: 40–50% No votes
U.S. Representative before election
Joe Heck
Republican
Elected U.S. Representative
Jacky Rosen
Democratic

The 3rd congressional district occupies the area south of Las Vegas, including Henderson, and most of unincorporated Clark County. The district was initially created after the 2000 census. The incumbent was Republican Joe Heck, who had represented the 3rd district since January 2011. Heck did not seek re-election to the U.S. House, instead running for the U.S. Senate seat vacated by Harry Reid.

=== Republican primary ===
==== Candidates ====
===== Nominee =====
- Danny Tarkanian, businessman, nominee for Secretary of State in 2006, candidate for U.S. Senate in 2010 and nominee for the 4th district in 2012

===== Eliminated in primary =====
- Michele Fiore, state assembly member and candidate for 1st district in 2010
- Andy Matthews, President of the Nevada Policy Research Institute
- Michael Roberson, Minority Leader of the Nevada Senate
- Annette Teijeiro, physician and nominee for the 1st district in 2014

===== Declined =====
- Bob Beers, Las Vegas City Council member, former state senator and candidate for governor in 2006
- Joe Heck, incumbent U.S. Representative (running for U.S. Senate)

==== Endorsements ====
Michael Roberson

Statewide officials

- Brian Sandoval, Governor of Nevada

==== Results ====
Republican primary results
Party	Candidate	Votes	%
Republican	Daniel Tarkanian	9,002	32.0
Republican	Michael Roberson	6,759	24.0
Republican	Michele Fiore	5,124	18.2
Republican	Andrew Matthews	3,975	14.1
Republican	Kerry Bowers	1,569	5.6
Republican	Annette Teijeiro	1,336	4.8
Republican	Sami Khal	381	1.3
Total votes		28,146	100.0

=== Democratic primary ===
==== Candidates ====
===== Nominee =====
- Jacky Rosen, synagogue president

===== Eliminated in primary =====
- Barry Michaels, businessman, ex-felon, Democratic candidate for this seat in 2006, 2008, and 2012 and Independent candidate in 2010
- Jesse Sbaih, attorney
- Steven Mitchell Schiffman, attorney
- Alex Channing Singer
- Neil M. Waite

===== Declined =====
- Aaron D. Ford, Minority Leader of the Nevada Senate
- Paula Francis, journalist and former KLAS-TV news anchor
- Susie Lee, President of Communities in Schools of Nevada (running for NV-04)
- Ross Miller, former secretary of state and nominee for attorney general in 2014
- Heather Murren, former securities analyst, Financial Crisis Inquiry Commission member, co-founder of the Nevada Cancer Institute and wife of MGM Resorts International CEO James Murren
- John Oceguera, former Speaker of the Nevada Assembly and nominee for this seat in 2012 (ran for NV-04)

==== Endorsements ====
Jacky Rosen

U.S. Senators

- Harry Reid, Nevada

Labor unions

- AFL-CIO
- Culinary Workers Union

Organizations

- EMILY's List

==== Results ====
Democratic primary results
Party	Candidate	Votes	%
Democratic	Jacky Rosen	14,221	62.2
Democratic	Jesse Sbaih	2,928	12.8
Democratic	Barry Michaels	2,219	9.7
Democratic	Steven Schiffman	1,237	5.4
Democratic	Alex Singer	1,208	5.3
Democratic	Neil Waite	1,055	4.6
Total votes		22,868	100.0

=== General election ===
==== Polling ====
Poll source	Date(s) administered	Sample size	Margin of error	Danny Tarkanian (R)	Jacky Rosen (D)	David Goosen (I)	Warren Markowitz (IA)	Undecided
Global Strategy Group (D-Rosen)	October 13–16, 2016	403	± 4.9%	37%	44%	—	—	19%
The Tarrance Group (R-NRCC)	September 27–29, 2016	400	± 5.0%	42%	37%	5%	1%	15%
DCCC (D)	September 27, 2016	458	± 4.6%	37%	40%	?%	?%	<23%
The Tarrance Group (R)	August 8–11, 2016	412	± 5.0%	46%	34%	—	—	20%
Global Strategy Group (D-Rosen)	July 2016	?	± ?%	44%	39%	—	—	17%
DCCC (D)	June 18–19, 2016	341	± 5.3%	34%	40%	—	—	26%

==== Predictions ====
Source	Ranking	As of
The Cook Political Report	Tossup	November 7, 2016
Daily Kos Elections	Lean D (flip)	November 7, 2016
Rothenberg	Tossup	November 3, 2016
Sabato's Crystal Ball	Lean D (flip)	November 7, 2016
RCP	Tossup	October 31, 2016

==== Results ====
Nevada's 3rd congressional district, 2016
Party	Candidate	Votes	%
Democratic	Jacky Rosen	146,869	47.2
Republican	Danny Tarkanian	142,926	46.0
Independent American	Warren Markowitz	11,602	3.7
Independent	David Goossen	9,566	3.1
Total votes		310,963	100.0
Democratic gain from Republican			

== District 4 ==
2016 Nevada's 4th congressional district election
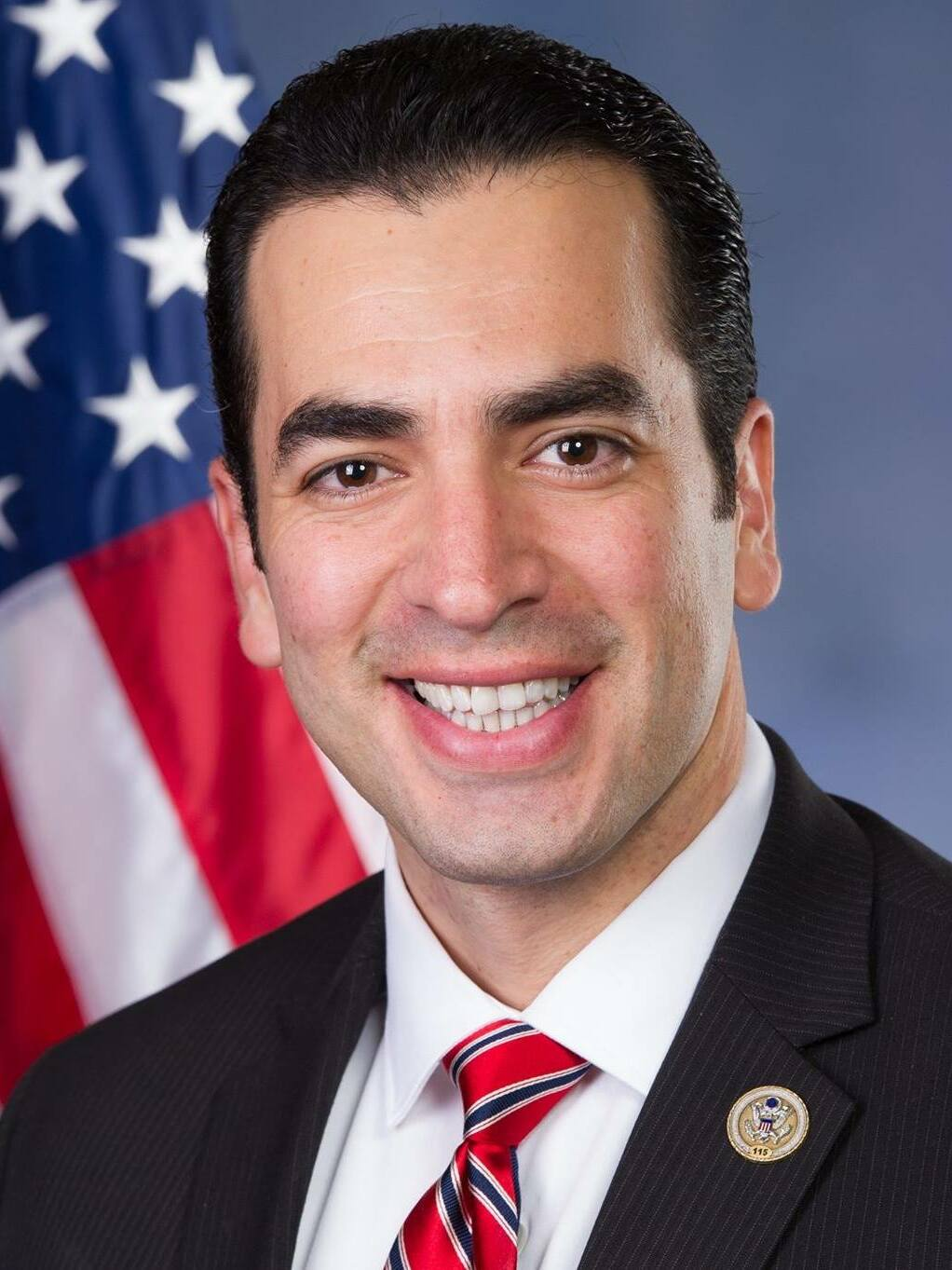

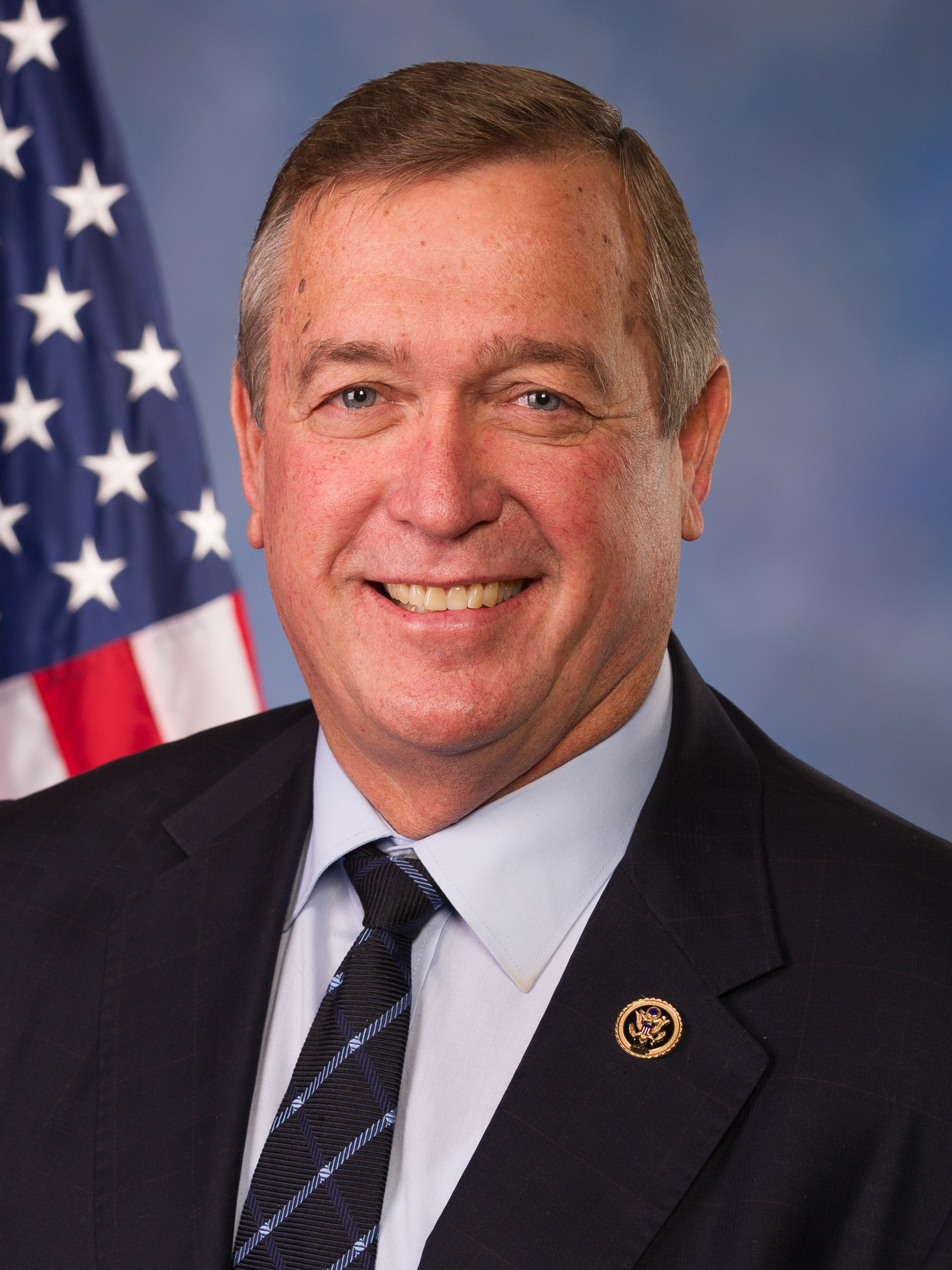
Nominee	Ruben Kihuen	Cresent Hardy
Party	Democratic	Republican
Popular vote	128,985	118,328
Percentage	48.6%	44.5%
- Precinct results Kihuen: 40–50% 50–60% 60–70% 70–80% 80–90% >90% Hardy: 40–50% 50–60% 60–70% 70–80% 80–90% >90% Tie: 40–50% No votes
U.S. Representative before election
Cresent Hardy
Republican
Elected U.S. Representative
Ruben Kihuen
Democratic

The 4th Congressional District is a new district that was created as a result of the 2010 census. Located in the central portion of the state, it includes most of northern Clark County, parts of Douglas and Lyon counties, and all of Esmeralda, Lincoln, Mineral, Nye and White Pine counties. More than four-fifths of the district's population lives in Clark County.

In 2014, Republican Cresent Hardy defeated the Democratic incumbent Representative, Steven Horsford. After the election, Horsford indicated that he might run against Hardy in 2016, but later declined.

=== Republican primary ===
==== Candidates ====
===== Nominee =====
- Cresent Hardy, incumbent U.S. Representative

===== Eliminated in primary =====
- Mike Monroe
- Wayne Villines

==== Results ====
Republican primary results
Party	Candidate	Votes	%
Republican	Cresent Hardy (incumbent)	18,610	76.8
Republican	Mike Monroe	4,336	17.9
Republican	Wayne Villines	1,290	5.3
Total votes		24,236	100.0

=== Democratic primary ===
Kihuen became the first Democrat to announce his campaign for the seat in March 2015. Flores entered the race in April.

==== Candidates ====
===== Nominee =====
- Ruben Kihuen, state senator and candidate for the 1st district in 2012

===== Eliminated in primary =====
- Morse Arberry, Jr., former state assembly member
- Brandon Casutt
- Lucy Flores, former state assembly member and nominee for lieutenant governor in 2014
- Susie Lee, President of Communities in Schools of Nevada
- Dan Rolle
- Mike Schaefer
- Rodney Smith

===== Withdrawn =====
- John Oceguera, former Speaker of the Nevada Assembly and nominee for NV-03 in 2012

===== Declined =====
- Kelvin Atkinson, state senator
- Ricki Barlow, Las Vegas City Council member
- Shelley Berkley, former U.S. Representative and nominee for U.S. Senate in 2012
- Steven Horsford, former U.S. Representative
- John Jay Lee, North Las Vegas Mayor and former state senator
- Pat Spearman, state senator

==== Endorsements ====
Lucy Flores

U.S. Senators

- Bernie Sanders, Vermont

Organizations

- NARAL Pro-Choice America
Ruben Kihuen

U.S. Senators

- Harry Reid, Nevada

Labor unions

- AFL-CIO
- American Federation of State, County and Municipal Employees
- Culinary Workers Union
Susie Lee

Organizations

- EMILY's List

==== Results ====
Democratic primary results
Party	Candidate	Votes	%
Democratic	Ruben Kihuen	12,221	39.9
Democratic	Lucy Flores	7,854	25.7
Democratic	Susie Lee	6,407	21.0
Democratic	Morse Arberry	1,902	6.2
Democratic	Rodney Smith	869	2.8
Democratic	Mike Schaefer	773	2.5
Democratic	Dan Rolle	336	1.1
Democratic	Brandon Casutt	240	0.8
Total votes		30,602	100.0

=== General election ===
==== Polling ====
Poll source	Date(s) administered	Sample size	Margin of error	Cresent Hardy (R)	Ruben Kihuen (D)	Steve Brown (L)	Mike Little (AI)	Undecided
GBA Strategies (D-DCCC)	October 13–16, 2016	400	± 4.9%	38%	40%	−	−	22%
Harper Polling (R-NRCC)	July 6–7, 2016	400	± 4.9%	38%	36%	7%	5%	15%

==== Predictions ====
Source	Ranking	As of
The Cook Political Report	Lean D (flip)	November 7, 2016
Daily Kos Elections	Lean D (flip)	November 7, 2016
Rothenberg	Tilt D (flip)	November 3, 2016
Sabato's Crystal Ball	Lean D (flip)	November 7, 2016
RCP	Lean D (flip)	October 31, 2016

==== Results ====
Nevada's 4th congressional district, 2016
Party	Candidate	Votes	%
Democratic	Ruben Kihuen	128,985	48.6
Republican	Cresent Hardy (incumbent)	118,328	44.5
Libertarian	Steve Brown	10,206	3.8
Independent American	Mike Little	8,327	3.1
Total votes		265,846	100.0
Democratic gain from Republican			
