= 2014 United States House of Representatives elections in Nevada =

- November 4, 2014

All 4 Nevada seats to the United States House of Representatives
	Majority party	Minority party
Party	Republican	Democratic
Last election	2	2
Seats won	3	1
Seat change	▲1	▼1
Popular vote	304,809	210,147
Percentage	56.13%	38.70%
Swing	▲9.17%	▼7.85%

Republican
40–50%
50–60%
60–70%
70–80%
Democratic
50–60%

The 2014 United States House of Representatives elections in Nevada were held on Tuesday, November 4, 2014, to elect the four U.S. representatives from the state of Nevada, one from each of the state's four congressional districts. The elections coincided with the elections of other federal and state offices, including a gubernatorial election. As of 2024, this is the last time the Republicans won a majority of House districts in Nevada, as well as the last time Nevada's 2nd congressional district was won with over 60% of the vote.

== Overview ==
=== Statewide ===
Party	Candidates	Votes		Seats		
Party	Candidates	No.	%	No.	+/–	%
Republican	4	304,809	56.13	3	▲1	75.00
Democratic	4	210,147	38.70	1	▼1	25.00
Independent American	3	16,770	3.09	0	Steady	0.0
Libertarian	3	8,302	1.53	0	Steady	0.0
Independent	2	2,981	0.55	0	Steady	0.0
Total	16	543,009	100.0	4	Steady	100.0

Popular vote
Republican	56.13%
Democratic	38.70%
American Ind	3.09%
Libertarian	1.53%
Other	0.55%

House seats
Republican	75.00%
Democratic	25.00%

=== By district ===
Results of the 2014 United States House of Representatives elections in Nevada by district:

District	Republican		Democratic		Others		Total		Result
District	Votes	%	Votes	%	Votes	%	Votes	%	Result
District 1	30,413	37.88%	45,643	56.84%	4,243	5.28%	80,299	100.0%	Democratic hold
District 2	122,402	65.73%	52,016	27.93%	11,792	6.33%	186,210	100.0%	Republican hold
District 3	88,528	60.75%	52,644	36.13%	4,547	3.12%	145,719	100.0%	Republican hold
District 4	63,466	48.53%	59,844	45.76%	7,471	5.71%	130,781	100.0%	Republican gain
Total	304,809	56.13%	210,147	38.70%	28,053	5.17%	543,009	100.0%	

== District 1 ==
2014 Nevada's 1st congressional district election
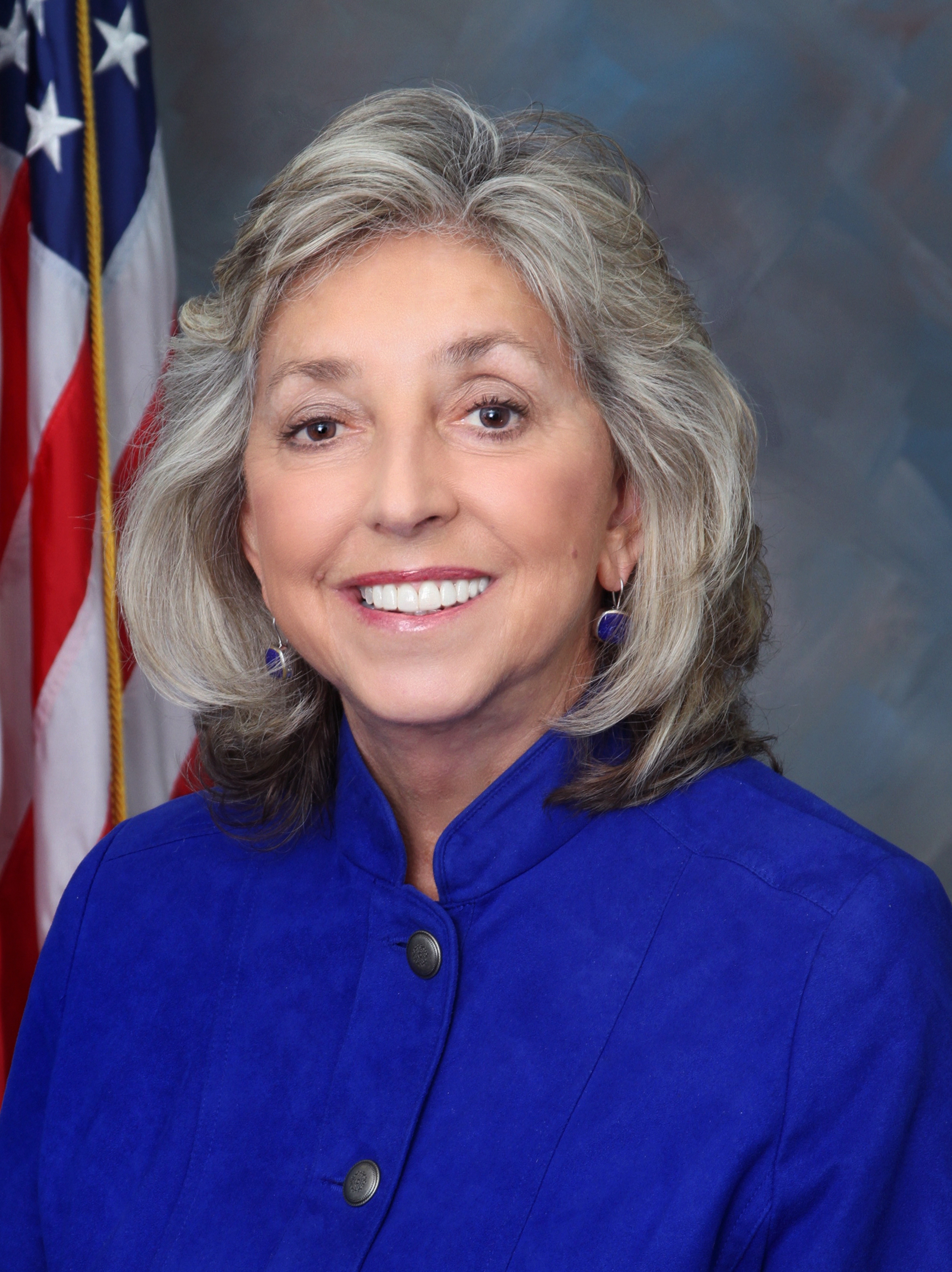

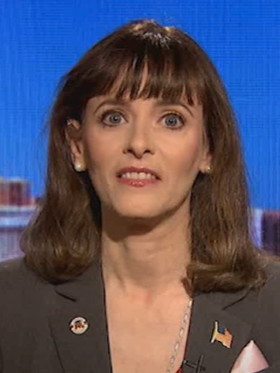
Nominee	Dina Titus	Annette Teijeiro
Party	Democratic	Republican
Popular vote	45,643	30,413
Percentage	56.8%	37.9%
- County results Titus: 50–60%
U.S. Representative before election
Dina Titus
Democratic
Elected U.S. Representative
Dina Titus
Democratic

Nevada's 1st congressional district occupies most of Nevada's largest city, Las Vegas, as well as parts of North Las Vegas and parts of unincorporated Clark County. The district is strongly Democratic. The incumbent Democrat Dina Titus, who had represented the 1st district since January 2013 and the 3rd district between 2009 and 2011, ran for re-election.

=== Democratic primary ===
==== Candidates ====
===== Nominee =====
- Dina Titus, incumbent U.S. Representative

===== Eliminated in primary =====
- Herb Peters, retired aerospace engineer, seven-time Libertarian candidate for Congress in California and Republican candidate for this seat in 2012

===== Withdrawn =====
- Darren Welsh

==== Results ====
Democratic primary results
Party	Candidate	Votes	%
Democratic	Dina Titus (incumbent)	12,966	86.0
Democratic	Herbert Glenn Peters	2,106	14.0
Total votes		15,072	100.0

=== Republican primary ===
==== Candidates ====
===== Nominee =====
- Annette Teijeiro, doctor and candidate for state senate in 2012

===== Eliminated in primary =====
- Jose Padilla

==== Results ====
Republican primary results
Party	Candidate	Votes	%
Republican	Annette Teijeiro	6,083	54.7
Republican	Jose Padilla	5,045	45.3
Total votes		11,128	100.0

=== General election ===
==== Endorsements ====
Dina Titus (D)

Labor unions

- AFL-CIO
- International Brotherhood of Boilermakers
- National Association of Letter Carriers

Organizations

- Human Rights Campaign
- National Organization for Women
- Sierra Club

Newspapers

- Las Vegas Sun

==== Polling ====
Poll source	Date(s) administered	Sample size	Margin of error	Dina Titus (D)	Annette Teijeiro (R)	Other	Undecided
New York Times/CBS News Battleground Tracker	October 16–23, 2014	197	± 12.0%	52%	37%	7%	5%

==== Predictions ====
Source	Ranking	As of
The Cook Political Report	Safe D	November 3, 2014
Rothenberg	Safe D	October 24, 2014
Sabato's Crystal Ball	Safe D	October 30, 2014
RCP	Safe D	November 2, 2014
Daily Kos Elections	Safe D	November 4, 2014

==== Results ====
Nevada's 1st congressional district, 2014
Party	Candidate	Votes	%
Democratic	Dina Titus (incumbent)	45,643	56.8
Republican	Annette Teijeiro	30,413	37.9
Libertarian	Richard Charles	2,617	3.3
Independent American	Kamau Bakari	1,626	2.0
Total votes		80,299	100.0
Democratic hold			

== District 2 ==
2014 Nevada's 2nd congressional district election
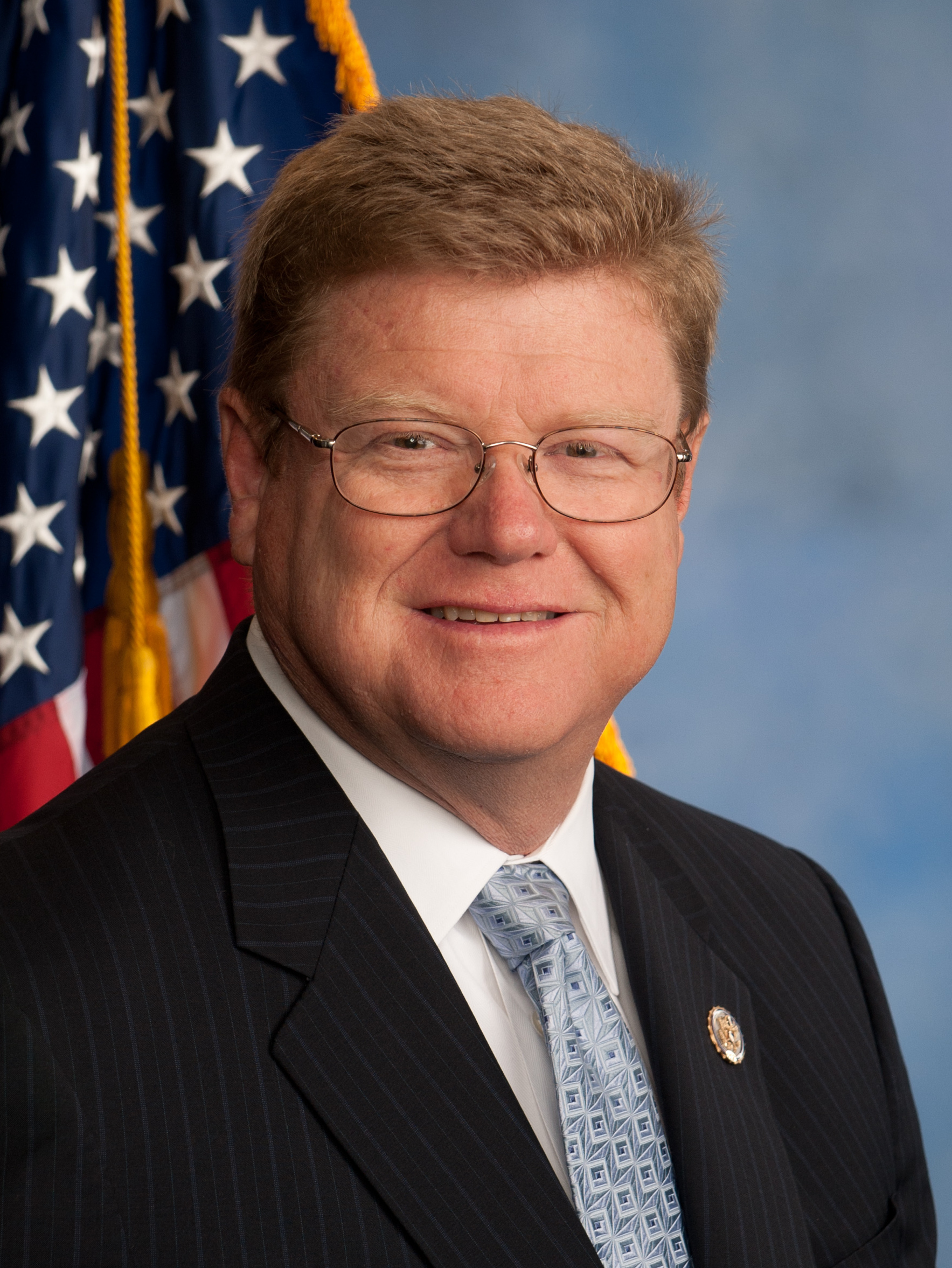

Nominee	Mark Amodei	Kristen Spees	Janine Hansen
Party	Republican	Democratic	Independent American
Popular vote	122,402	52,016	11,792
Percentage	65.7%	28.0%	6.3%
U.S. Representative before election
Mark Amodei
Republican
Elected U.S. Representative
Mark Amodei
Republican

Nevada's 2nd congressional district includes the northern third of the state. It includes most of Douglas and Lyon counties; all of Churchill, Elko, Eureka, Humboldt, Pershing and Washoe counties; and the state capital, Carson City. The largest city in the district is Reno, the state's third largest city. Although the district appears rural, its politics are dominated by Reno and Carson City, which combined cast over 85 percent of the district's vote. The incumbent Republican Mark Amodei, who had represented the 2nd district since September 2011, ran for re-election.

=== Republican primary ===
==== Candidates ====
===== Nominee =====
- Mark Amodei, incumbent U.S. Representative

=== Democratic primary ===
==== Candidates ====
===== Nominee =====
- Kristen Spees, planning attorney

===== Eliminated in primary =====
- Vance Alm
- Brian Dempsey
- Ed Lee

==== Results ====
Democratic primary results
Party	Candidate	Votes	%
Democratic	Kristen Spees	8,206	38.3
Democratic	Brian Dempsey	6,804	31.8
Democratic	Vance Alm	3,225	15.1
Democratic	Ed Lee	3,164	14.8
Total votes		21,399	100.0

=== General election ===
Spees was aiming to become the youngest woman ever elected to Congress.

==== Endorsements ====
Mark Amodei (R)

Organizations

- National Federation of Independent Business
- National Rifle Association - Political Victory Fund
- National Right to Life Committee

==== Polling ====
Poll source	Date(s) administered	Sample size	Margin of error	Mark Amodei (R)	Kristen Spees (D)	Other	Undecided
New York Times/CBS News Battleground Tracker	October 16–23, 2014	310	± 8.0%	62%	24%	5%	9%

==== Predictions ====
Source	Ranking	As of
The Cook Political Report	Safe R	November 3, 2014
Rothenberg	Safe R	October 24, 2014
Sabato's Crystal Ball	Safe R	October 30, 2014
RCP	Safe R	November 2, 2014
Daily Kos Elections	Safe R	November 4, 2014

==== Results ====
Nevada's 2nd congressional district, 2014
Party	Candidate	Votes	%
Republican	Mark Amodei (incumbent)	122,402	65.7
Democratic	Kristen Spees	52,016	28.0
Independent American	Janine Hansen	11,792	6.3
Total votes		186,210	100.0
Republican hold			

== District 3 ==
2014 Nevada's 3rd congressional district election
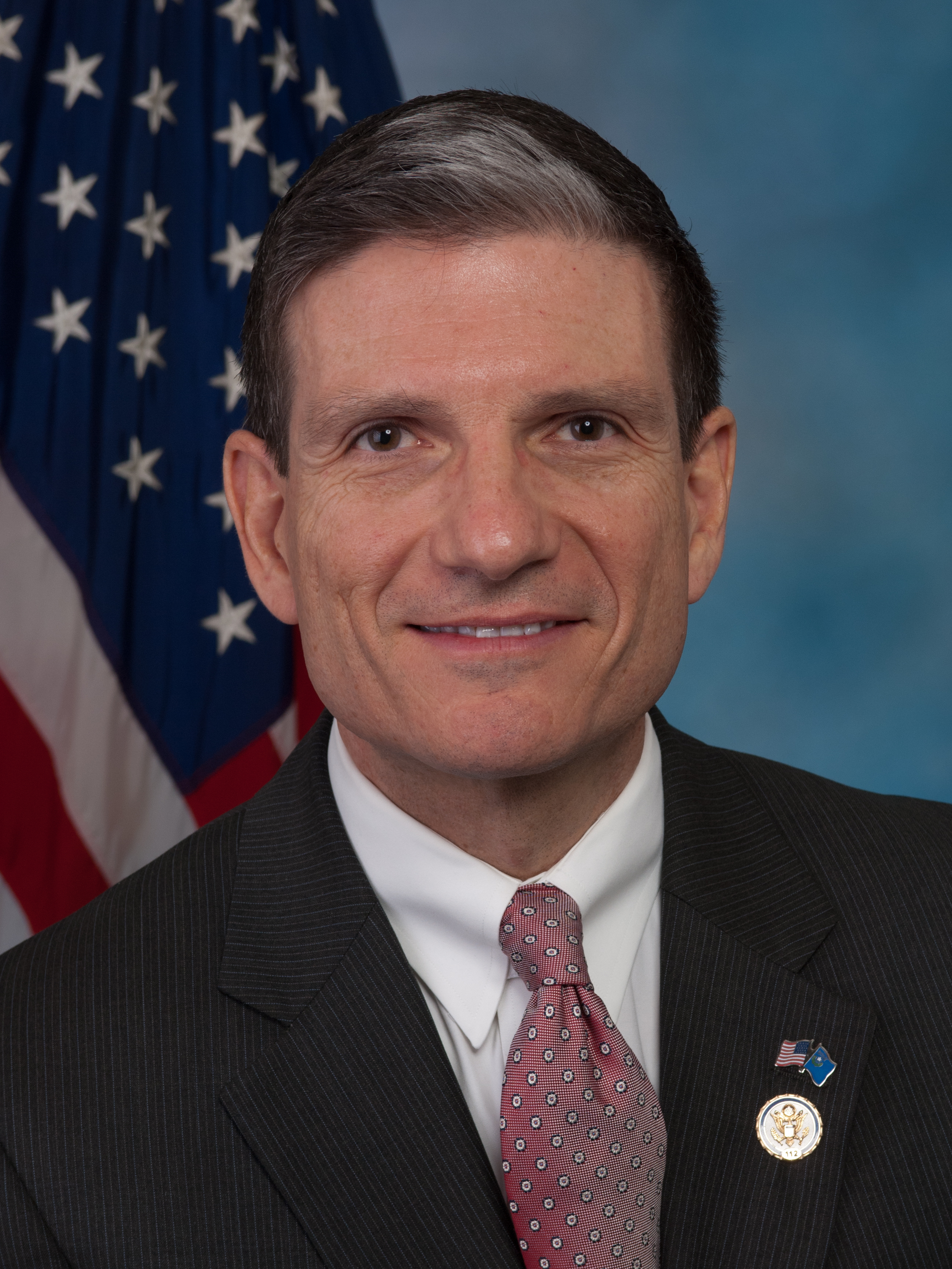

Nominee	Joe Heck	Erin Bilbray
Party	Republican	Democratic
Popular vote	88,528	52,644
Percentage	60.8%	36.1%
- County results Heck: 60–70%
U.S. Representative before election
Joe Heck
Republican
Elected U.S. Representative
Joe Heck
Republican

The 3rd congressional district occupies the area south of Las Vegas, including Henderson, and most of unincorporated Clark County. The district was initially created after the 2000 census. The incumbent Republican Joe Heck, who had represented the 3rd district since January 2011, ran for re-election.

=== Republican primary ===
==== Candidates ====
===== Nominee =====
- Joe Heck, incumbent U.S. Representative

=== Democratic primary ===
The Democratic Congressional Campaign Committee invited Bilbray to the second inauguration of Barack Obama, where she met with party figures. She is the daughter of James Bilbray, who represented the 1st district from 1987 to 1995 and served in the Nevada State Senate from 1980 to 1986.

==== Candidates ====
===== Nominee =====
- Erin Bilbray, Democratic National Committee member and founder of Emerge Nevada

===== Eliminated in primary =====
- Zachary "Mr. Z" Campbell

===== Withdrawn =====
- Frank Kassela, professional poker player

==== Results ====
Democratic primary results
Party	Candidate	Votes	%
Democratic	Erin Bilbray	13,204	84.0
Democratic	Zachary "Mr. Z" Campbell	2,511	16.0
Total votes		15,715	100.0

=== General election ===
==== Campaign ====
Although initially being seen as a competitive race, heading into the general election, most political analysts had Heck with a clear advantage. Throughout the campaign, Heck's campaign raised $2,402,397.89, over twice Bilbray's $1,118,057.80. Heck also befitted from $1,703,762 from outside groups, while only $13,473 was spent supporting Bilbray.

Bilbray also had three different campaign managers in eight months, which led to the lack of a clear strategy.

==== Endorsements ====
Joe Heck (R)

State officials

- Mitt Romney, former Governor of Massachusetts and Republican presidential nominee in 2012

Organizations

- National Federation of Independent Business
- National Republican Congressional Committee "Patriot" Program
- National Rifle Association - Political Victory Fund
- National Right to Life Committee
Erin Bilbray (D)

Labor unions

- AFL-CIO
- American Federation of State, County and Municipal Employees
- International Brotherhood of Boilermakers
- National Association of Letter Carriers

Organizations

- Democratic Congressional Campaign Committee "Red to Blue" Program
- EMILY's List
- Human Rights Campaign
- National Organization for Women
- Sierra Club

Newspapers

- Las Vegas Sun

==== Polling ====
Poll source	Date(s) administered	Sample size	Margin of error	Joe Heck (R)	Erin Bilbray (D)	Other	Undecided
New York Times/CBS News Battleground Tracker	October 16–23, 2014	491	± 7.0%	46%	32%	5%	17%
Mellman Group (D−Bilbray)	April 21–23, 2014	400	± 4.9%	39%	31%	–	30%

==== Predictions ====
Source	Ranking	As of
The Cook Political Report	Likely R	November 3, 2014
Rothenberg	Safe R	October 24, 2014
Sabato's Crystal Ball	Safe R	October 30, 2014
RCP	Likely R	November 2, 2014
Daily Kos Elections	Safe R	November 4, 2014

==== Debate ====
2014 Nevada's 3rd congressional district debate
No.	Date	Host	Moderator	Link	Republican	Democratic
Key: P Participant A Absent N Not invited I Invited W Withdrawn						
Key: P Participant A Absent N Not invited I Invited W Withdrawn					Joe Heck	Erin Bilbray
1	Oct. 25, 2022	Vegas PBS	Steve Sebelius; Elizabeth Thompson	YouTube	P	P

==== Results ====
Nevada's 3rd congressional district, 2014
Party	Candidate	Votes	%
Republican	Joe Heck (incumbent)	88,528	60.8
Democratic	Erin Bilbray	52,644	36.1
Independent	David Goossen	1,637	1.1
Libertarian	Randy Kimmick	1,566	1.1
Independent	Steven St John	1,344	0.9
Total votes		145,719	100.0
Republican hold			

== District 4 ==
2014 Nevada's 4th congressional district election
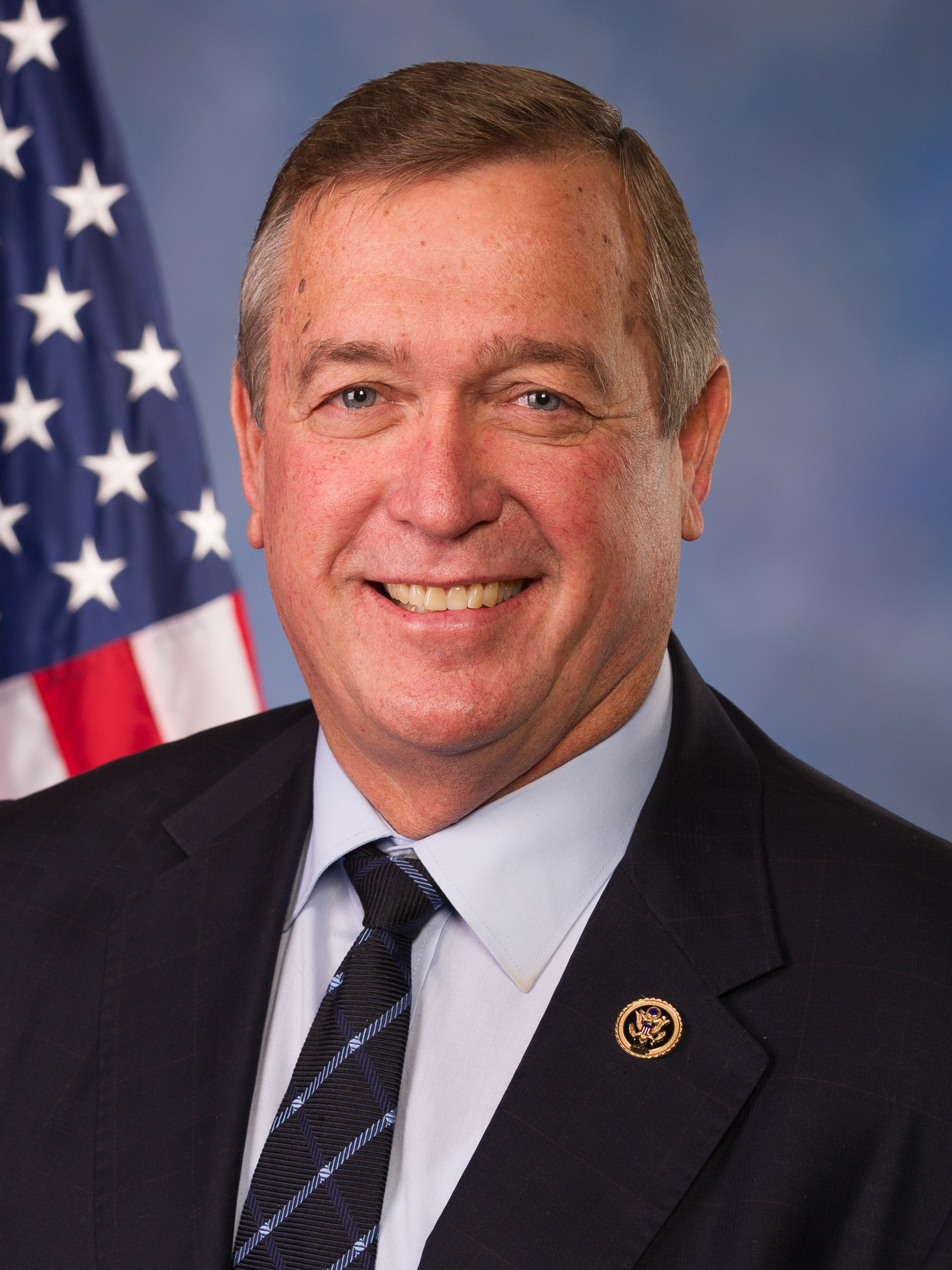

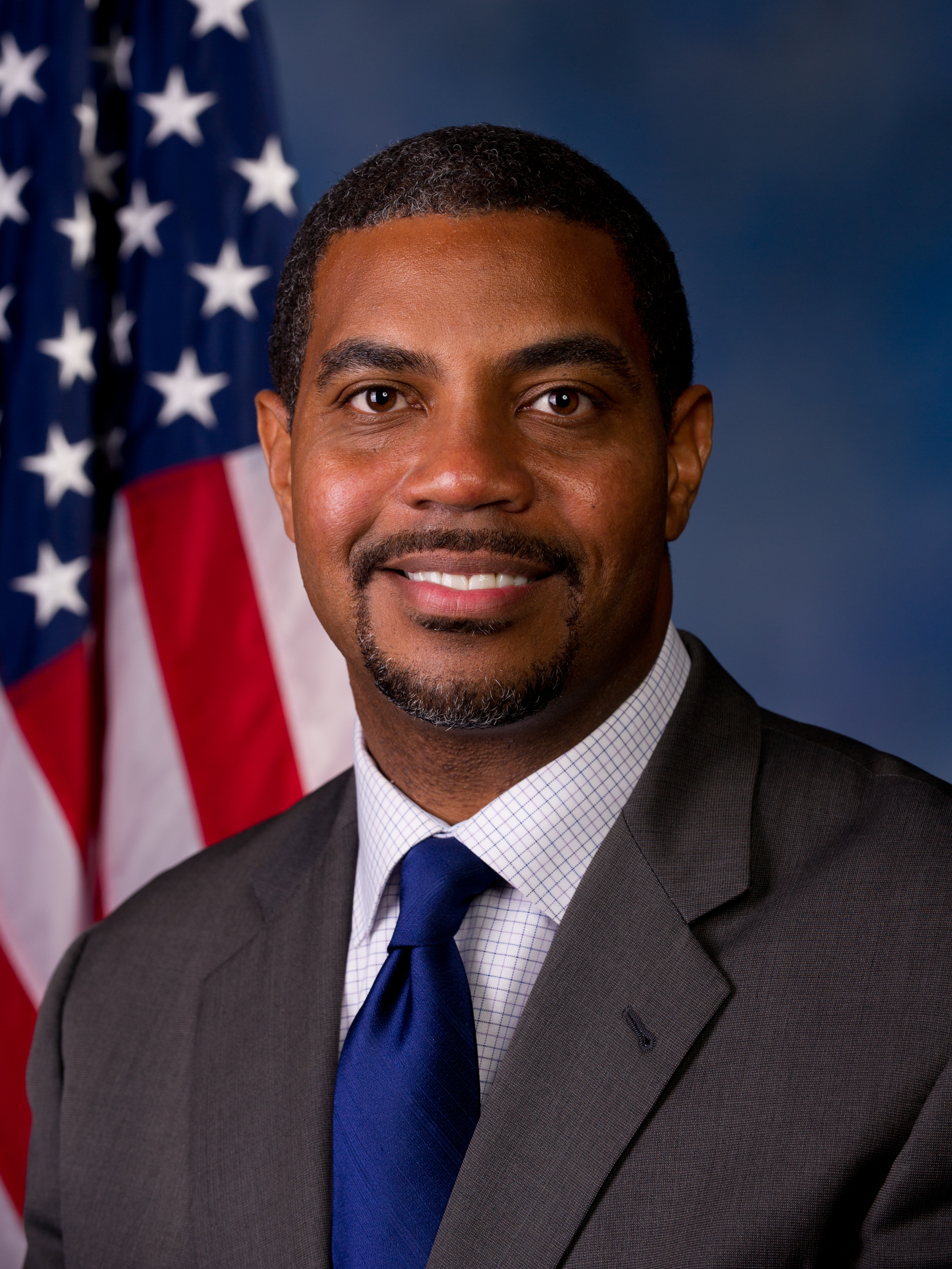
Nominee	Cresent Hardy	Steven Horsford
Party	Republican	Democratic
Popular vote	63,466	59,844
Percentage	48.5%	45.8%
- County results Hardy: 40–50% 50–60% 60–70% 70–80% Horsford: 40–50%
U.S. Representative before election
Steven Horsford
Democratic
Elected U.S. Representative
Cresent Hardy
Republican

The 4th congressional district is located in the central portion of the state, it includes most of northern Clark County, parts of Douglas and Lyon counties, and all of Esmeralda, Lincoln, Mineral, Nye and White Pine counties. More than four-fifths of the district's population lives in Clark County. The incumbent Democrat Steven Horsford, who had represented the 4th district since January 2013, ran for re-election, but narrowly lost to Republican Cresent Hardy in one of the biggest upsets of the cycle.

=== Democratic primary ===
==== Candidates ====
===== Nominee =====
- Steven Horsford, incumbent U.S. Representative

===== Eliminated in primary =====
- Mark J. Budetich
- Sid Zeller, retired Marine intelligence officer and Republican candidate for this seat in 2012

==== Results ====
Democratic primary results
Party	Candidate	Votes	%
Democratic	Steven Horsford (incumbent)	16,269	84.3
Democratic	Mark J. Budetich	1,532	7.9
Democratic	Sid Zeller	1,498	7.8
Total votes		19,299	100.0

=== Republican primary ===
==== Candidates ====
===== Nominee =====
- Cresent Hardy, Assistant Minority Leader of the Nevada Assembly

===== Eliminated in primary =====
- Niger Innis, spokesman for the Congress of Racial Equality
- Michael Ace Monroe
- Carlo "Mazunga" Poliak

==== Results ====
Republican primary results
Party	Candidate	Votes	%
Republican	Cresent Hardy	10,398	42.6
Republican	Niger Innis	8,077	33.1
Republican	Michael Ace Monroe	5,393	22.1
Republican	Carlo "Mazunga" Poliak	523	2.2
Total votes		27,075	100.0

=== General election ===
==== Campaign ====
Being at a large financial disadvantage to the incumbent, the Hardy campaign adopted the unusual strategy of paying to run a Horsford ad featuring President Obama in the rural parts of the district where Republicans tend to poll well.

==== Endorsements ====
Steven Horsford (D)

Labor unions

- AFL-CIO
- International Brotherhood of Boilermakers
- National Association of Letter Carriers

Organizations

- Human Rights Campaign
- League of Conservation Voters
- Sierra Club

Newspapers

- Las Vegas Sun
Cresent Hardy (R)

Organizations

- National Republican Congressional Committee "On the Radar" Program
- National Rifle Association - Political Victory Fund
- National Right to Life Committee

==== Polling ====
Poll source	Date(s) administered	Sample size	Margin of error	Steven Horsford (D)	Cresent Hardy (R)	Other	Undecided
New York Times/CBS News Battleground Tracker	October 16–23, 2014	316	± 9.0%	45%	36%	5%	13%

==== Predictions ====
Source	Ranking	As of
The Cook Political Report	Lean D	November 3, 2014
Rothenberg	Likely D	October 24, 2014
Sabato's Crystal Ball	Lean D	October 30, 2014
RCP	Lean D	November 2, 2014
Daily Kos Elections	Tilt D	November 4, 2014

==== Results ====
On election night, Hardy upset Horsford by just over 3,500 votes, with a combination of, a favorable national environment for Republicans, weak Democratic turnout and a superior Republican strategy all being credited as factors in the result.

Nevada's 4th congressional district, 2014
Party	Candidate	Votes	%
Republican	Cresent Hardy	63,466	48.5
Democratic	Steven Horsford (incumbent)	59,844	45.8
Libertarian	Steve Brown	4,119	3.1
Independent American	Russell Best	3,352	2.6
Total votes		130,781	100.0
Republican gain from Democratic			

== See also ==
- 2014 United States House of Representatives elections
- 2014 United States elections
