= Cresent Hardy =

American politician (born 1957)

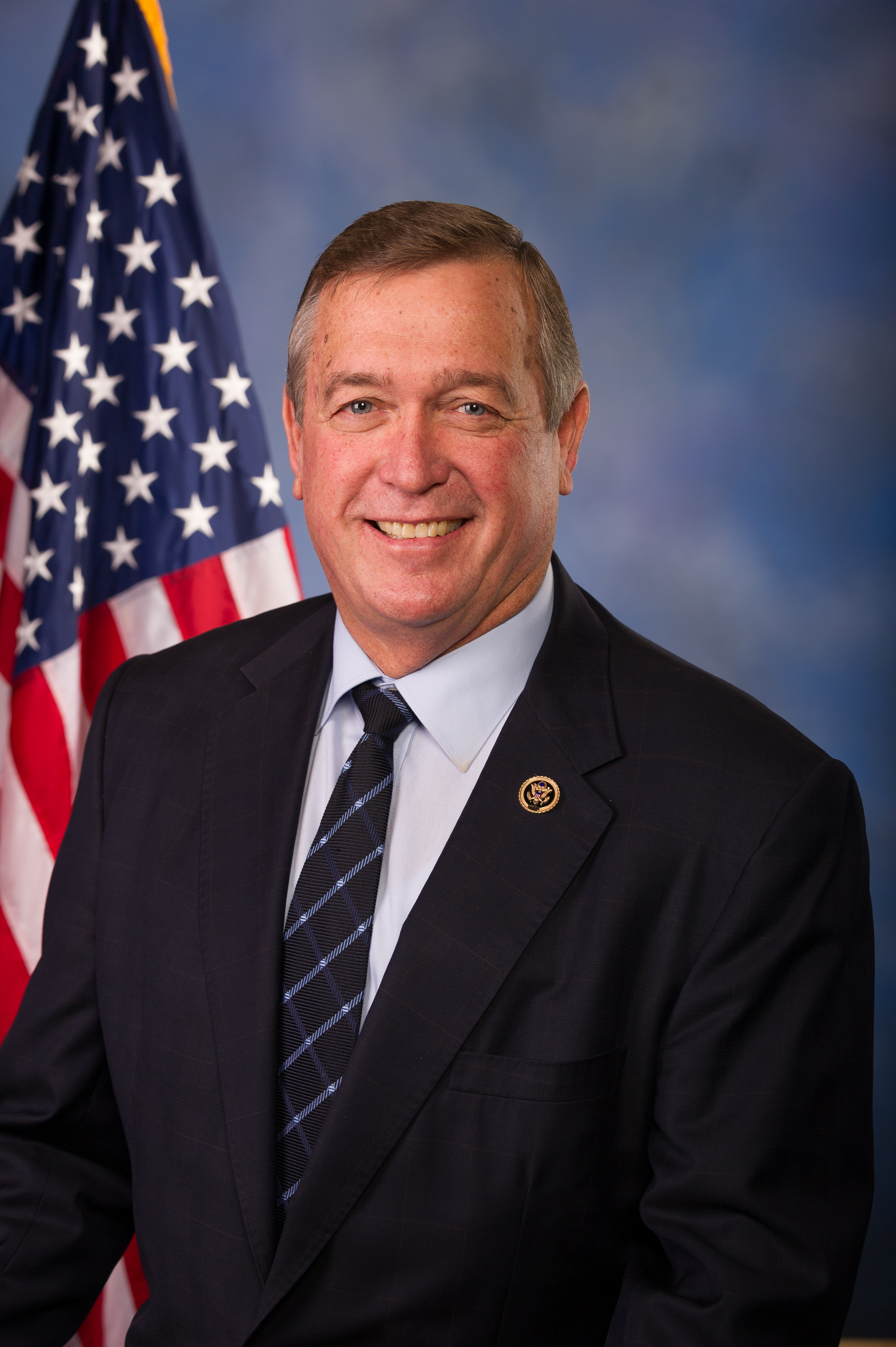

Member of the U.S. House of Representatives from Nevada's 4th district
- In office January 3, 2015 – January 3, 2017
- Preceded by: Steven Horsford
- Succeeded by: Ruben Kihuen

Member of the Nevada Assembly
- In office November 3, 2010 – November 5, 2014
- Preceded by: Joe Hardy
- Succeeded by: Chris Edwards
- Constituency: 20th district (2010–2012); 19th district (2012–2014)

Personal details
- Born: Cresent Leo Hardy; June 23, 1957 (age 69) Mesquite, Nevada, U.S.
- Party: Republican
- Spouse: Peri Jean
- Children: 4
- Education: Utah Tech University (BA)

Cresent Leo Hardy (born June 23, 1957) is an American politician and businessman who served as the U.S. representative for Nevada's 4th congressional district from 2015 to 2017. A member of the Republican Party, he previously served in the Nevada Assembly from 2010 to 2014.

Hardy unseated one-term Democratic incumbent Steven Horsford in 2014, then lost his own bid for re-election in the 2016 general election to Democratic challenger Ruben Kihuen. Kihuen then retired after one term due to sexual misconduct allegations, so Hardy ran for his old seat in 2018, losing to Horsford in a rematch. Hardy later ran unsuccessfully for Nevada's 1st congressional district in the 2022 election.

== Early life and education ==
Hardy graduated from Virgin Valley High School and Dixie State College.

== Business career ==
Since leaving college, Hardy has pursued a career in business. He is a partial owner of properties in Alaska and Utah as well as in and around Mesquite, Nevada. Prior to entering Congress, he was a partner in a construction company. He was also one of several owners of Mesquite's Falcon Ridge Golf Course, which he personally designed.

Hardy began his career in government by serving as the public works director in Mesquite, Nevada. He then became a member of the Virgin Valley Water District and a member of the Mesquite City Council. He was elected to the Nevada State Assembly in 2010.

== U.S. House of Representatives ==
=== Elections ===
==== 2014 ====
Hardy ran as a candidate for the United States House of Representatives in Nevada's 4th congressional district, held by Steven Horsford of the Democratic Party, in the 2014 election. Hardy defeated Horsford 48.5% to 45.7%.

Hardy held "a number of community meetings" after being elected. He said "the two issues he heard about most often...were jobs and health care," and these would become his priorities in office.

==== 2016 ====
Hardy ran for re-election in 2016. Hardy faced two challengers in the Republican primary in June 2016, winning 77.44% of the vote. In the general election, he faced Democratic state senator Ruben Kihuen. Kihuen defeated Hardy with 48.5% of the vote. While Hardy carried six of the district's seven counties, he could not overcome a 24,000-vote deficit in Clark County. After initially supporting Donald Trump's presidential bid, Hardy said in October 2016 he would not vote for Trump.

==== 2018 ====
In January 2018, Hardy announced his candidacy for his old congressional seat after Republican Las Vegas City Councilman Stavros Anthony dropped out of the race. He won the June 2018 Republican primary. In August 2018, Speaker of the House Paul Ryan campaigned for Hardy in Las Vegas.

Hardy faced Democratic nominee and former U.S. Representative for the district, Steven Horsford in the general election. Horsford defeated Hardy, winning 52% of the vote to Hardy's 44%. Third-party candidates took the remaining 4% of the vote.

=== Committee assignments ===
- Committee on Natural Resources
  - Subcommittee on Energy and Mineral Resources
  - Subcommittee on Federal Lands
- Committee on Small Business
  - Subcommittee on Contracting and Workforce (Chair)
  - Subcommittee on Investigations, Oversight and Regulations
- Committee on Transportation and Infrastructure
  - Subcommittee on Highways and Transit
  - Subcommittee on Railroads, Pipelines, and Hazardous Materials
  - Subcommittee on Water Resources and Environment

== Political positions ==
=== Immigration ===
Hardy voted against an amendment to defund President Barack Obama's DACA program.

=== Health care ===
In 2016, Hardy and Terri Sewell (D-AL) introduced the Rural Health Enhancement and Long Term Health Act (HEALTH), intended to forestall the closure of rural hospitals.

=== Iran deal ===
Hardy opposed President Obama's Iran deal.

== Personal life ==
Hardy and his wife, Peri Jean Hardy, have four children and two grandchildren.

In August 2016, Hardy was hospitalized after a heart attack that occurred while he was preparing to undergo a colonoscopy. The next day he returned to his re-election campaign. Doctors discovered he had been living with a collapsed artery on his heart, and they inserted two stents to repair it.

== Electoral history ==
2014 Republican primary results
Party	Candidate	Votes	%
Republican	Cresent Hardy	10,398	42.6
Republican	Niger Innis	8,077	33.1
Republican	Michael Ace Monroe	5,393	22.1
Republican	Carlo "Mazunga" Poliak	523	2.2
Total votes		27,075	100.0

2016 Republican primary results
Party	Candidate	Votes	%
Republican	Cresent Hardy	18,610	76.79%
Republican	Mike Monroe	4,336	17.89%
Republican	Wayne Villines	1,290	5.32%
Total votes		24,236	100.00%

2018 Republican primary results
Party	Candidate	Votes	%
Republican	Cresent Hardy	15,252	47.4
Republican	David Gibbs	6,098	19.0
Republican	Bill Townsend	3,659	11.4
Republican	Kenneth Wegner	3,625	11.3
Republican	Jeff Miller	2,560	8.0
Republican	Mike Monroe	971	3.0
Total votes		32,165	100.0

Nevada's 4th congressional district, 2018
Party	Candidate	Votes	%
Democratic	Steven Horsford	121,962	51.9
Republican	Cresent Hardy	102,748	43.8
Independent American Party (Nevada)	Warren Markowitz	3,180	1.3
Independent	Rodney Smith	2,733	1.2
Libertarian	Greg Luckner	2,213	0.9
Independent	Dean McGonigle	2,032	0.9
Total votes		234,868	100.0
Democratic hold			

2022 Republican primary results
Party	Candidate	Votes	%
Republican	Mark Robertson	12,286	30.1
Republican	David Brog	7,183	17.6
Republican	Carolina Serrano	6,981	17.1
Republican	Cresent Hardy	4,767	11.7
Republican	Cynthia Steel	4,760	11.7
Republican	Jane Adams	2,065	5.1
Republican	Morgun Sholty	1,988	4.9
Republican	Jessie Turner	829	2.0
Total votes		40,859	100.0

U.S. House of Representatives
Preceded by Steven Horsford	Member of the U.S. House of Representatives from Nevada's 4th congressional district 2015–2017	Succeeded by Ruben Kihuen
U.S. order of precedence (ceremonial)
Preceded by Evan Jenkins as Former U.S. Representative	Order of precedence of the United States as Former U.S. Representative	Succeeded by Ruben Kihuen as Former U.S. Representative
