= Ruben Kihuen =

American politician (born 1980)

Rubén Kihuen
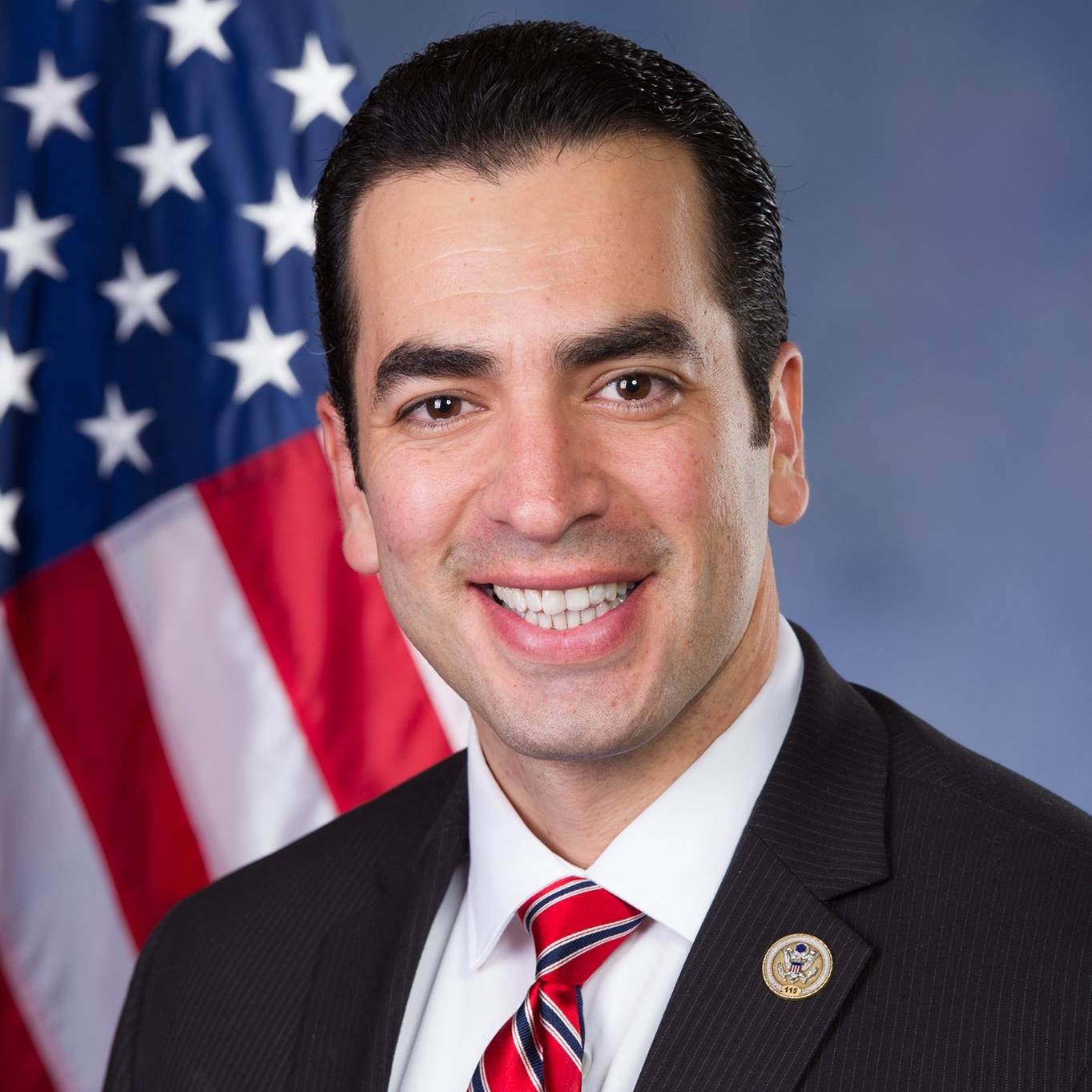

Member of the U.S. House of Representatives from Nevada's 4th district
- In office January 3, 2017 – January 3, 2019
- Preceded by: Cresent Hardy
- Succeeded by: Steven Horsford

Member of the Nevada State Senate from the 10th district
- In office January 2011 – January 2017
- Preceded by: Bob Coffin
- Succeeded by: Yvanna Cancela

Member of the Nevada Assembly from the 11th district
- In office January 2007 – January 2011
- Preceded by: Bob McCleary
- Succeeded by: Olivia Diaz

Personal details
- Born: Rubén Jesús Kihuen Bernal; April 25, 1980 (age 46) Guadalajara, Mexico
- Party: Democratic
- Education: College of Southern Nevada; University of Nevada, Las Vegas (BS); University of Oklahoma

Rubén Jesús Kihuen Bernal (/ˈruːbən ˈkiːwɪn/; born April 25, 1980) is an American politician and former member of the United States House of Representatives for Nevada's 4th congressional district, serving from 2017 to 2019. A member of the Democratic Party, he previously was a member of the Nevada State Senate from 2006 to 2016. He was Nevada's first Latino member of the U.S. House of Representatives and Kihuen described himself as the first "Dreamer" elected to Congress. In December 2017, House Minority Leader Nancy Pelosi called on Kihuen to resign in response to sexual misconduct allegations against him by a female campaign staff member, as reported by BuzzFeed. He refused to resign but did not run for reelection in 2018.

== Early life and education ==
Rubén Jesús Kihuen Bernal was born in Guadalajara, Mexico. His family moved to the United States in 1988. Kihuen's grandfather was an immigrant to Mexico from Lebanon who married a native Mexican. His father Armando Kihuen was a laborer in Orange County, California, before moving to Las Vegas in the 1990s and becoming a middle school science teacher. Kihuen attended Rancho High School and was named the 1997–1998 Nevada "soccer player of the year."

Kihuen graduated from the University of Nevada, Las Vegas with a Bachelor of Science degree in education. While in high school and college, he volunteered for the campaigns of Senator Harry Reid, Virginia Governor Mark Warner, and Houston Mayor Lee Brown. As of 2011, Kihuen was enrolled in the Master of Public Administration degree program at the University of Oklahoma.

== Early career ==
In 2002, Kihuen became a deputy field director for the Nevada Democratic Party. He then was regional representative to Senate Majority Leader Harry Reid. He then worked as student recruiter and academic advisor for the College of Southern Nevada (CSN). He is a past member of the Clark County Community Development Advisory Committee and the North Las Vegas Citizen's Advisory Committee.

== Nevada legislature ==
Kihuen was first elected to the State Assembly in 2006, defeating incumbent Bob McCleary by a large margin (and with the support of the AFL-CIO) in a 3-way primary. The primary was shrouded by a scandal surrounding McCleary's payment of $500 to David Adams, the third candidate in the race, who had briefly dropped out after the payment; Adams described the payment as a bribe while McCleary insisted that the payment had been compensation to work on his campaign. Kihuen was unopposed in the general election.

Kihuen served two terms before successfully running in 2010 to the Nevada State Senate after the incumbent was term-limited. During the 76th legislative session in 2011 he was the chair of the Senate Select Committee on Economic Growth and Employment. In the 77th legislative session in 2013, he chaired the Senate Standing Committee on Revenue and Economic Development and served as Majority Whip for the Democrats in the Senate.

== U.S. House of Representatives ==
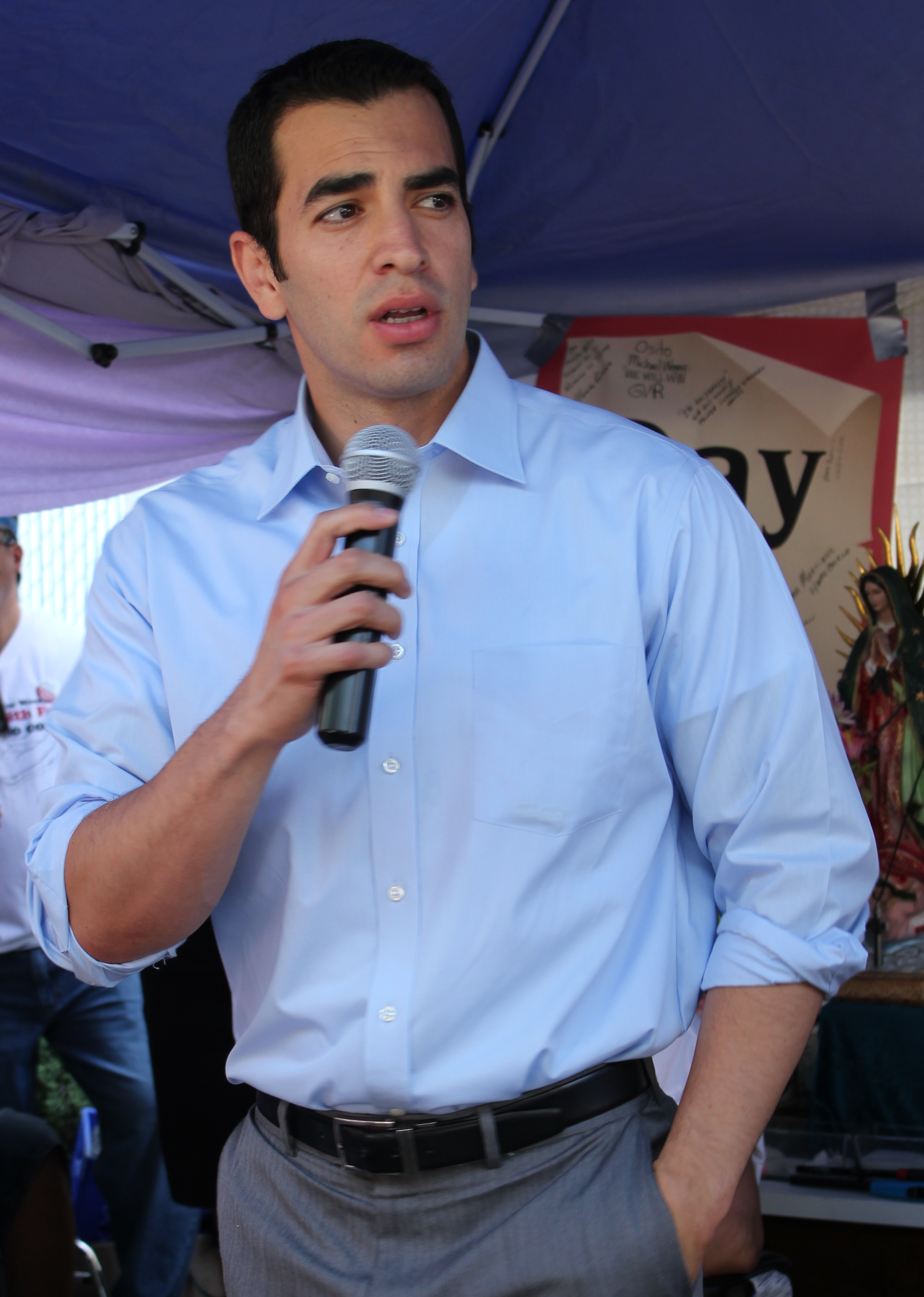
Kihuen in 2012

=== Elections ===
==== 2012 ====
In September 2011, Kihuen announced his intention to run to represent Nevada's 1st congressional district but withdrew a month before filing opened in February 2012, allowing former Representative Dina Titus to run without a contested primary.

==== 2016 ====
On March 28, 2015, Kihuen announced he was running for Congress in Nevada's 4th congressional district, seeking to defeat first-term incumbent Republican Cresent Hardy. He defeated seven other candidates in the Democratic primary on June 14, 2016. Kihuen spoke at the 2016 Democratic National Convention, the only 2016 House recruit to do so. During the campaign, Kihuen was on leave from his job at the Las Vegas-based public relations firm the Ramirez Group.

Kihuen was criticized early in the campaign for still residing in the 1st district rather than the 4th. However, members of the House are only required to live in the state they represent.

Kihuen won the election by a vote of 128,680 (48.5%) to 118,220 (44.5%). While Hardy carried six of the district's seven counties, Kihuen easily defeated Hardy in the district's share of Clark County, winning it by over 24,000 votes.

=== Committee assignments ===
- Committee on Financial Services
  - Subcommittee on Housing and Insurance
  - Subcommittee on Terrorism and Illicit Finance

=== Caucus memberships ===
- Congressional Hispanic Caucus
- Congressional Progressive Caucus
- New Democrat Coalition
- Congressional Asian Pacific American Caucus

== Sexual misconduct allegations ==
Timeline of allegations
February 6, 2016: Kihuen follows finance director to her car, and tells her "You look really good, I'd like to take you out if you didn't work for me". She told Kihuen that she had a boyfriend and left.
February 19: Kihuen, while in an elevator with the finance director at the Aria Hotel on the way to a meeting with Tony Cárdenas, propositions her and suggests "we should get a hotel room here"; she refuses. While returning to campaign headquarters after the meeting, Kihuen began to touch her thigh and ask if she ever cheated on her boyfriend; she demanded he stop.
March: Kihuen asked the finance director for assistance with his computer during call time, when she was looking at the screen, he groped the back of her thigh.

On December 1, 2017, a 25-year-old woman who served as finance director of Kihuen's 2016 congressional campaign accused him of sexual harassment and unwanted touching. The woman, who joined Kihuen's campaign in June 2015 and left in April 2016, alleged that Kihuen's behavior began in February, that he repeatedly requested that she go on dates or have sexual intercourse with him, and on two occasions forcibly touched her thighs without consent.

Upon resigning from the campaign in April, the woman had reported to a mid-level staffer at the Democratic Congressional Campaign Committee that Kihuen had made her feel "uncomfortable", without offering any further details. The mid-level staffer proceeded to confer with another mid-level staffer, who in turn called Kihuen's campaign manager, Dave Chase, and informed him of the woman's discomfort around Kihuen. Chase then confronted Kihuen, who denied that anything had occurred.

In addition to the finance director's conversation with the DCCC operative, she also documented Kihuen's behavior in a series of March 10, 2016, text messages to a friend, and shared contemporaneous details of her departure with four other individuals at the time. When asked about the accusations, Kihuen said, "I sincerely apologize for anything that I may have said or done that made her feel uncomfortable."

=== Response ===
The chair of the Democratic Congressional Campaign Committee, Ben Ray Luján, demanded Kihuen's resignation immediately after being presented with the allegations by BuzzFeed on December 1, saying that "If anyone is guilty of sexual harassment or sexual assault, they should not hold elected office, Congressman Kihuen should resign."

Luján further punished Kihuen by ordering his immediate removal from the DCCC's Frontline program for incumbents in vulnerable seats.

Luján was joined just after midnight on December 2 by House Democratic Leader Nancy Pelosi, who called for Kihuen's resignation and declared that "the young woman's documented account is convincing, and I commend her for the courage it took to come forward".

Nevada Democrats were quick to condemn Kihuen, although only Jacky Rosen, a fellow member of Congress, explicitly called for him to resign. Aaron Ford, Kihuen's former leader in the Nevada State Senate, told reporters that he was "deeply disappointed and disturbed" by the allegations. Perhaps the most scathing criticism came from Congresswoman Dina Titus, who said that "many believed Ruben had great potential, but unfortunately his personal behavior has jeopardized his political career" and that "zero tolerance means zero tolerance. Ruben needs to step up and do what's right for the people of Nevada".

Chase, who managed Kihuen's successful campaign but did not join his Washington office, told BuzzFeed that he believed the former finance director, and wished that he "had known her specific allegations when I confronted Ruben after she left the campaign or in time to stop what took place".

Lucy Flores, who served alongside Kihuen in the Nevada Legislature and had been his Democratic primary opponent in 2016, said that she found the allegations unsurprising given his reputation in the legislature, where "even though he maintained a girlfriend, he was known to be very flirtatious and hands on" and that she had "personally witnessed him being grabby with young, attractive women".

Later in the day on December 5, Kihuen gave his first interview since the allegations to ABC News, in which he declared his refusal to resign, instead saying that he "finds it interesting" that Pelosi, Lujan, and the DCCC "knew about these allegations last year". Kihuen went on to say that the DCCC and party leadership had investigated the allegations, but that "they didn't find anything, and they continued investing millions of dollars in my campaign". This was immediately denied by both Pelosi's office, which said that "Leader Pelosi first learned of these allegations from BuzzFeed last week", and the DCCC, who called Kihuen's statement "not true", adding that the DCCC had been "presented with these disturbing facts for the first time last week, and the chair immediately called for his resignation".

On December 13, a second woman accused Kihuen of sexual misconduct. The woman, who asked to remain anonymous, told The Nevada Independent that he touched her thighs or butt in three separate incidents, and had sent her hundreds of sexually suggestive text messages. A third woman accused Kihuen of improper touching.

On December 16, Kihuen announced that he would not seek re-election in 2018, but later claimed he was reconsidering this decision; however he later backtracked and decided not to run again.

In November 2018, the House Ethics Committee formally sanctioned Kihuen, determining he "made persistent and unwanted advances towards women". The report noted that "each of the complainant’s allegations were supported by documentary evidence and some of the alleged incidents were corroborated by third-party witnesses."

In January 2019, Kihuen ran for a Las Vegas City Council seat but was defeated in the primary, coming in third.

== Electoral history ==
Nevada's 4th congressional Democratic primary, 2016
Party	Candidate	Votes	%
Democratic	Ruben Kihuen	12,221	39.9
Democratic	Lucy Flores	7,854	25.7
Democratic	Susie Lee	6,407	21.0
Democratic	Morse Arberry	1,902	6.2
Democratic	Rodney Smith	869	2.8
Democratic	Mike Schaefer	773	2.5
Democratic	Dan Rolle	336	1.1
Democratic	Brandon Casutt	240	0.8
Total votes		30,602	100.0

Nevada's 4th congressional district, 2016
Party	Candidate	Votes	%
Democratic	Ruben Kihuen	128,985	48.6
Republican	Cresent Hardy (incumbent)	118,328	44.5
Libertarian	Steve Brown	10,206	3.8
Independent American Party (Nevada)	Mike Little	8,327	3.1
Total votes		265,846	100.0
Democratic gain from Republican			

Las Vegas City Council Ward 3 primary, 2019
Candidate	Votes	%
Olivia Diaz	1,016	33.15
Melissa Clary	866	28.25
Ruben Kihuen	861	28.09
David A. Lopez	102	3.33
Shawn Mooneyham	90	2.94
Aaron Bautista	71	2.32
Mingo Collaso	59	1.92
Total votes	3,065	100

== Post–legislative career ==
After leaving Congress, Kihuen became the external relations director for Las Vegas' Immigrant Home Foundation (Fundacion Casa de Los Migrantes). Among his duties was publicizing a COVID-19 vaccination drive among Spanish-speaking immigrants and their families.

== See also ==
- List of Arab and Middle Eastern Americans in the United States Congress
- List of Hispanic and Latino Americans in the United States Congress

U.S. House of Representatives
Preceded by Cresent Hardy	Member of the U.S. House of Representatives from Nevada's 4th congressional district 2017–2019	Succeeded by Steven Horsford
U.S. order of precedence (ceremonial)
Preceded by Cresent Hardy as Former U.S. Representative	Order of precedence of the United States as Former U.S. Representative	Succeeded by Betsy Markey as Former U.S. Representative
