= 2018 New York's 14th congressional district election =

- November 6, 2018

New York's 14th congressional district
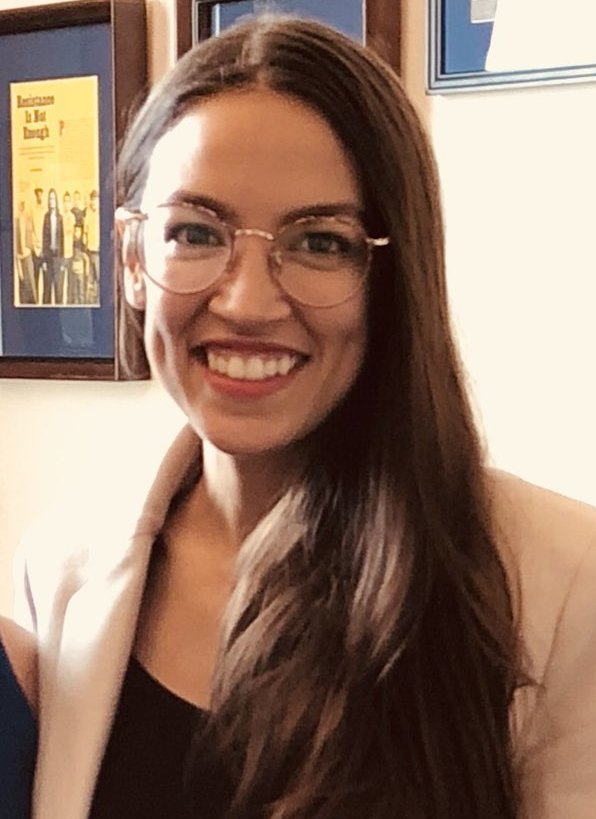

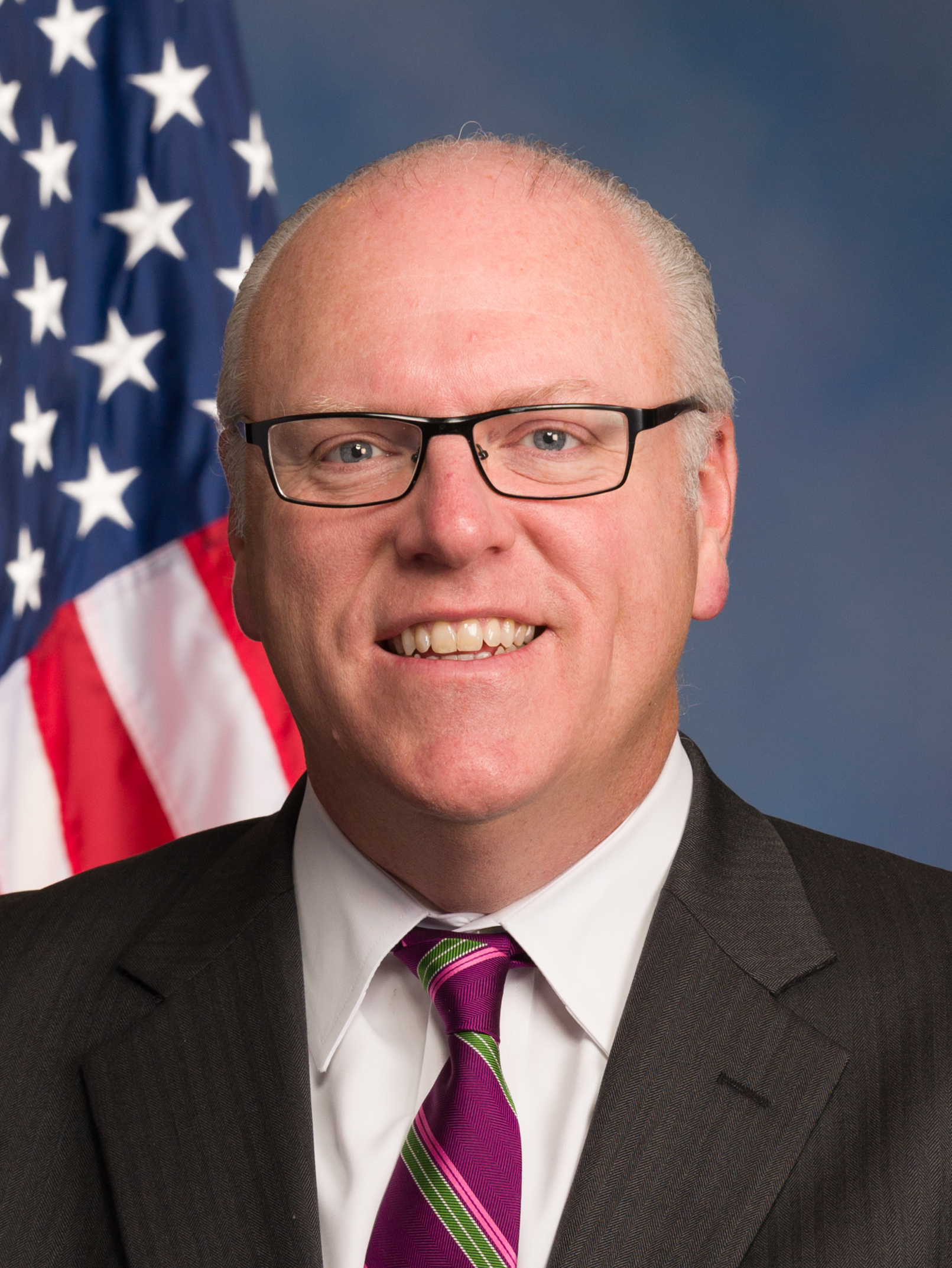
Nominee	Alexandria; Ocasio-Cortez	Anthony Pappas	Joe Crowley (Note: Crowley did not actively campaign)
Party	Democratic	Republican	Working Families (Note: Despite the WFP endorsing Ocasio-Cortez as their nominee, the party had already nominated Crowley as their candidate.)
Alliance			Women's Equality
Popular vote	110,318	19,202	9,348
Percentage	78.18%	13.61%	6.62%
U.S. Representative before election
Joseph Crowley
Democratic
Elected U.S. Representative
Alexandria Ocasio-Cortez
Democratic

The 2018 New York's 14th congressional district election was held on November 6, 2018. The primaries for New York's federal elections were held earlier in the year on June 26. Alexandria Ocasio-Cortez defeated incumbent congressman Joe Crowley in the primary, and went on to defeat Republican opponent Anthony Pappas in the general election.

As a political newcomer, Ocasio-Cortez was not expected to defeat Crowley in the primary election. As the results were tabulated, the race drew national recognition when it became clear that Ocasio-Cortez would win over Crowley, the Democratic Caucus Chairman and a 10-term incumbent. Ocasio-Cortez began her campaign in April 2017 while waiting tables and tending bar at Flats Fix, a taqueria in New York City's Union Square. She was the first person since 2004 to challenge Crowley in a primary, and she undertook a grassroots campaign without donations from corporations or PACs.

Ocasio-Cortez went on to defeat Pappas in the district election. Taking office at age 29, Ocasio-Cortez became the youngest woman to serve in the United States Congress.

== Background ==
The 14th district is located in New York City and includes the Eastern Bronx and part of North-Central Queens. The incumbent was Democrat Joe Crowley, a leader of the New Democrat Coalition. Crowley had represented the district since 2013, after representing the 7th district from 1999 to 2013. He was re-elected for a tenth term, with 83% of the votes, in 2016. Crowley, who had been named as a potential successor to Nancy Pelosi as House Leader or Speaker, sought re-election in 2018.

=== Primary candidates ===
==== Joe Crowley ====
At the time of the election, Crowley was the incumbent U.S. Representative from New York's 14th congressional district. First elected to the seat in 1998, Crowley replaced Thomas J. Manton who, having already circulated petitions and filed for re-election, withdrew on the last day it was legally possible. Manton phoned Crowley to tell him his name would be on the general election ballot. During his tenure, Crowley served as Chair of the House Democratic Caucus from 2017 to 2019, as well as the local chairman of the Queens County Democratic Party from 2006 to 2019. He previously served in the New York State Assembly from 1987 to 1998.

==== Alexandria Ocasio-Cortez ====
Ocasio-Cortez's congressional campaign logo was inspired by "revolutionary posters and visuals from the past."

Before running for Congress, Ocasio-Cortez was an activist and worked as a waitress and bartender. She majored in international relations and economics at Boston University, graduating cum laude in 2011. She was an organizer in Bernie Sanders' 2016 presidential campaign. Backed by the organization Brand New Congress, Ocasio-Cortez challenged Crowley in the June primary alleging that Crowley was not progressive enough for the district. Ocasio-Cortez began her campaign in April 2017 while waiting tables and tending bar at Flats Fix, a taqueria in New York City's Union Square. "For 80 percent of this campaign, I operated out of a paper grocery bag hidden behind that bar," she told Bon Appétit.

Ocasio-Cortez was the first person since 2004 to challenge Crowley in a primary. She faced a financial disadvantage, saying: "You can't really beat big money with more money. You have to beat them with a totally different game." Ocasio-Cortez's campaign undertook grassroots mobilization and did not take donations from corporations. It was reported that the designs of the campaign posters were inspired by "revolutionary posters and visuals from the past." During the campaign, Ocasio-Cortez resided in Parkchester, Bronx, with web developer and boyfriend, Riley Roberts.

== Primary election ==
The 14th district is overwhelmingly Democratic, making a primary victory tantamount to election. Ocasio-Cortez's victory against Crowley was widely seen as the biggest upset of the 2018 midterm elections.

=== Primary endorsements ===
Ocasio-Cortez was endorsed by progressive and civil rights organizations such as MoveOn, Democracy for America, and Democratic Socialists of America, and by actress and first-time candidate Cynthia Nixon. Nixon, like Ocasio-Cortez, also challenged a long-time incumbent: She ran against Democratic governor Andrew Cuomo in the 2018 New York gubernatorial election, but lost by 66% to 34%.

Governor Cuomo endorsed Crowley, as did one of New York's U.S. Senators, Kirsten Gillibrand, as well as New York City Mayor Bill de Blasio, 11 U.S. Representatives, 31 local elected officials, 31 trade unions, and groups such as the Sierra Club, Planned Parenthood, the Working Families Party, NARAL Pro-Choice America, Moms Demand Action for Gun Sense in America, and others. California representative Ro Khanna, a Justice Democrat like Ocasio-Cortez, initially endorsed Joe Crowley, but later endorsed Ocasio-Cortez in an unusual dual endorsement.

=== Primary election debate ===
On June 15, the candidates' only face-to-face encounter during the campaign occurred on a local political talk show, Inside City Hall. The format was a joint interview conducted by Errol Louis, which NY1 characterized as a debate. A debate in the Bronx was scheduled for June 18, but Crowley did not participate, sending former New York City Council member Annabel Palma in his place.

=== Results ===
Results map by precinct (Interactive version) Ocasio-Cortez: 50–60%; 60–70%; 70–80%; 80–90%; 90–100%; Crowley: 50–60%; 60–70%; 70–80%; 80–90%; 90–100%; Tie No votes

New York's 14th congressional district Democratic primary, 2018
Party	Candidate	Votes	%
Democratic	Alexandria Ocasio-Cortez	16,898	56.75%
Democratic	Joseph Crowley (incumbent)	12,880	43.25%
Total votes		29,778	100.00%

On June 26, 2018, Ocasio-Cortez defeated Crowley 56.75%–43.25% with a margin of 4,018 votes. Her win came as a surprise to many political commentators and analysts and immediately garnered national attention. Time called her victory "the biggest upset of the 2018 elections so far". CNN made a similar statement. The New York Times described Crowley's loss as "a shocking primary defeat on Tuesday, the most significant loss for a Democratic incumbent in more than a decade, and one that will reverberate across the party and the country". The Guardian called it "one of the biggest upsets in recent American political history". She was outspent by a margin of 18 to 1 ($1.5 million to $83,000), but won the endorsement of some influential groups on the left. Merriam-Webster reported that searches for the word "socialism" spiked 1,500% after her victory. Crowley conceded defeat on election night, but did not telephone Ocasio-Cortez that night to congratulate her, fueling short-lived speculation that he intended to run against her in the general election. Bernie Sanders and Noam Chomsky congratulated Ocasio-Cortez.

Crowley was a high-ranking member in his party's caucus. His defeat in the primary was compared to House Majority Leader Eric Cantor's defeat in a Republican primary to Dave Brat in 2014. After her primary win, Ocasio-Cortez endorsed several progressive primary challengers to Democratic incumbents nationwide, capitalizing on her fame and spending her political capital in a manner unusual even for unexpected primary winners.

Without campaigning for it, Ocasio-Cortez won the Reform Party primary as a write-in candidate in a neighbouring congressional district, New York's 15th, with a total vote count of nine, highest among all 22 write-in candidates. She declined the nomination.

== General election ==
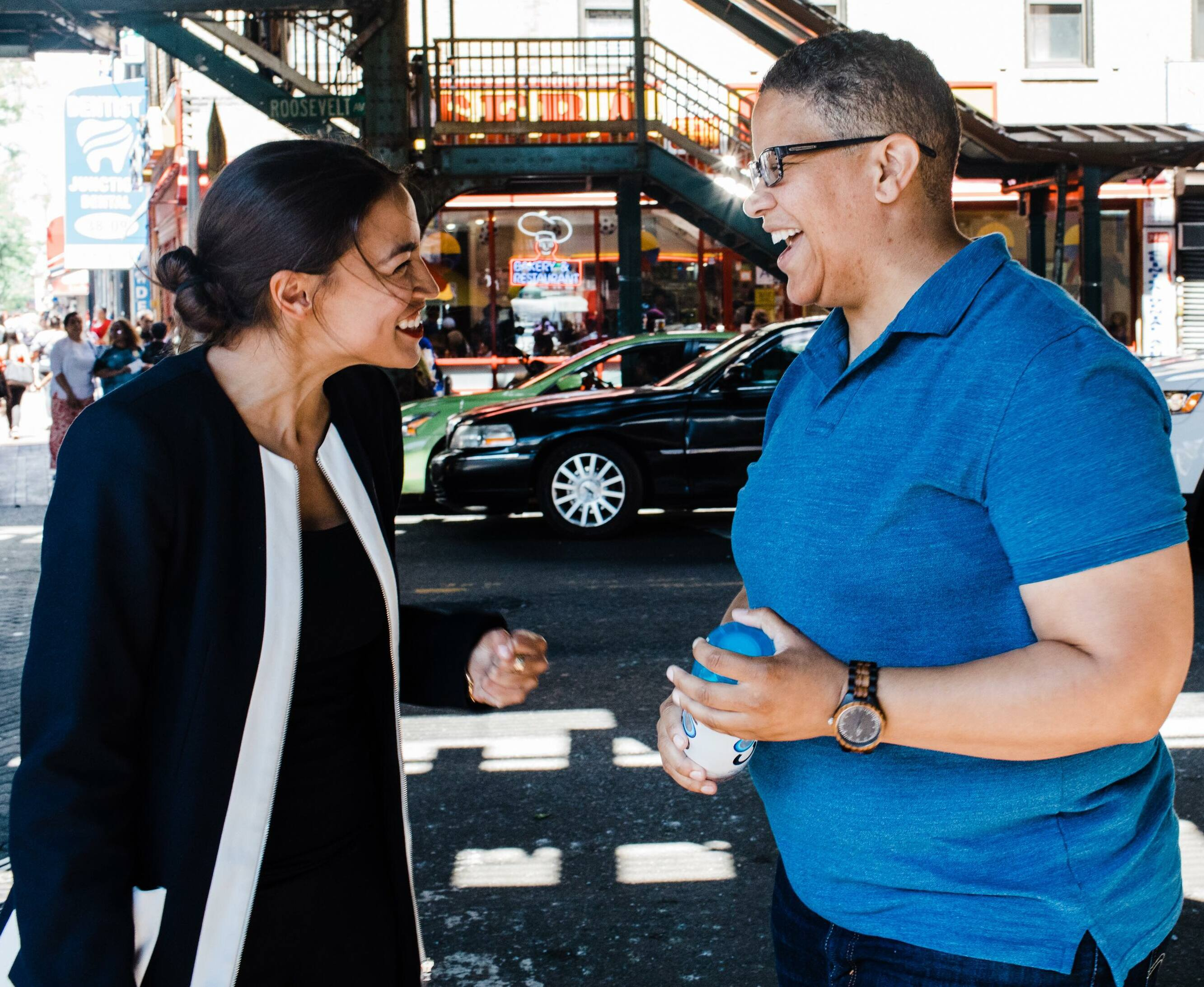
Ocasio-Cortez with Kerri Evelyn Harris during the 2018 general election

Ocasio-Cortez faced Republican nominee Anthony Pappas in the November 6 general election. Pappas, who lives in Astoria, is an economics professor at St. John's University. According to the New York Post, Pappas did not actively campaign. The Post also wrote that "Pappas' bid was a long shot," since the 14th has a Cook Partisan Voting Index of D+29, making it the sixth most Democratic district in New York City. Registered Democrats outnumber Republicans by almost six to one. The district and its predecessors have been in Democratic hands for all but two years since 1923 and without interruption since 1949.

Ocasio-Cortez was endorsed by various politically progressive organizations and figures, including former president Barack Obama and U.S. Senator Bernie Sanders. She spoke at the Netroots Nation conference in August 2018 and was called "the undisputed star of the convention."

Crowley also remained on the ballot as the nominee of the Working Families Party (WFP) and the Women's Equality Party (WEP). Neither Crowley nor the WFP party actively campaigned, with both having endorsed Ocasio-Cortez after her Democratic primary victory. Ocasio-Cortez described the WEP, which Governor Cuomo created ahead of the 2014 New York gubernatorial election, as a cynical, centrist group that endorsed male incumbents over female challengers like her and Nixon. Former Connecticut Senator Joe Lieberman, who won reelection in 2006 on a third-party line after losing the Democratic Primary in 2006, penned a July 17 column in the Wall Street Journal expressing his hope that Crowley would actively campaign on the WFP ballot line. Dan Cantor, Executive Director of the WFP, wrote an endorsement of, and apology to, Ocasio-Cortez for the New York Daily News. He asked voters not to vote for Crowley if his name remained on the general election ballot.

Ocasio-Cortez won the election with 78% of the vote (110,318) to Pappas' 14% (17,762). Crowley, on the WFP and WEP lines, received 9,348 votes (6.6%). Saikat Chakrabarti, who had been her campaign co-chair, became chief of staff for her congressional office. As co-creator of two progressive political action committees, he has been called a significant political presence.

=== Predictions ===
Source	Ranking	As of
The Cook Political Report	Safe D	November 5, 2018
Inside Elections	Safe D	November 5, 2018
Sabato's Crystal Ball	Safe D	November 5, 2018
RCP	Safe D	November 5, 2018

=== Media coverage ===
The first media network to give Ocasio-Cortez a platform and extensively cover her campaign and policies was The Young Turks (TYT), a left-wing online news program. After her primary win, she quickly garnered nationwide media attention, including numerous articles and TV talk-show appearances. She also drew a great deal of media attention when she and Sanders campaigned for James Thompson in Kansas in July 2018. A rally in Wichita had to be moved from a theater with a capacity of 1,500 when far more people said they would attend. The event drew 4,000 people, with some seated on the floor. In The New Yorker, Benjamin Wallace-Wells wrote that while Sanders remained "the de-facto leader of an increasingly popular left, [he is unable to] do things that do not come naturally to him, like supply hope." Wallace-Wells suggested that Ocasio-Cortez had made Sanders's task easier, as he could point to her success to show that ideas "once considered to be radical are now part of the mainstream."

Until she defeated incumbent Joe Crowley in the 2018 Democratic primary, Ocasio-Cortez received little coverage on most traditional news media outlets. Jimmy Dore interviewed her when she first announced her candidacy in June 2017. After her primary win, Brian Stelter wrote that progressive-media outlets, such as The Young Turks and The Intercept, "saw the Ocasio-Cortez upset coming" in advance. Margaret Sullivan wrote in The Washington Post that traditional metrics of measuring a campaign's viability, like total fundraising, were contributing to a "media failure."

Ocasio-Cortez's campaign was featured on the cover of the June 2018 edition of The Indypendent, a free New York City-based monthly newspaper. In a tweet, she hailed the cover appearance on "NYC's classic monthly" as a significant breakthrough for her campaign. Otherwise, Ocasio-Cortez was barely mentioned in print until her primary win.

=== Results ===
New York's 14th congressional district general election, 2018
Party	Candidate	Votes	%
Democratic	Alexandria Ocasio-Cortez	110,318	78.18%
Republican	Anthony Pappas	19,202	13.61%
Working Families	Joseph Crowley	8,075	5.72%
Women's Equality	Joseph Crowley	1,273	0.90%
Total	Joseph Crowley (incumbent)	9,348	6.62%
Conservative	Elizabeth Perri	2,254	1.60%
Total votes		141,122	100.00%
Democratic hold			

By county

County	Alexandria Ocasio-Cortez Democratic		Anthony Pappas Republican		Joe Crowley Working Families		All Others		Margin		Total votes
County	#	%	#	%	#	%	#	%	#	%	Total votes
Bronx (part)	38,587	75.4%	7,941	15.5%	3,601	7.0%	1,075	2.1%	30,646	59.9%	51,204
Queens (part)	71,731	73.9%	11,261	11.6%	5,747	5.9%	8,267	8.6%	60,470	62.3%	97,006
Totals	110,318	78.1%	19,202	13.6%	9,348	6.6%	2,336	1.7%	91,116	64.5%	141,204

== Post election ==
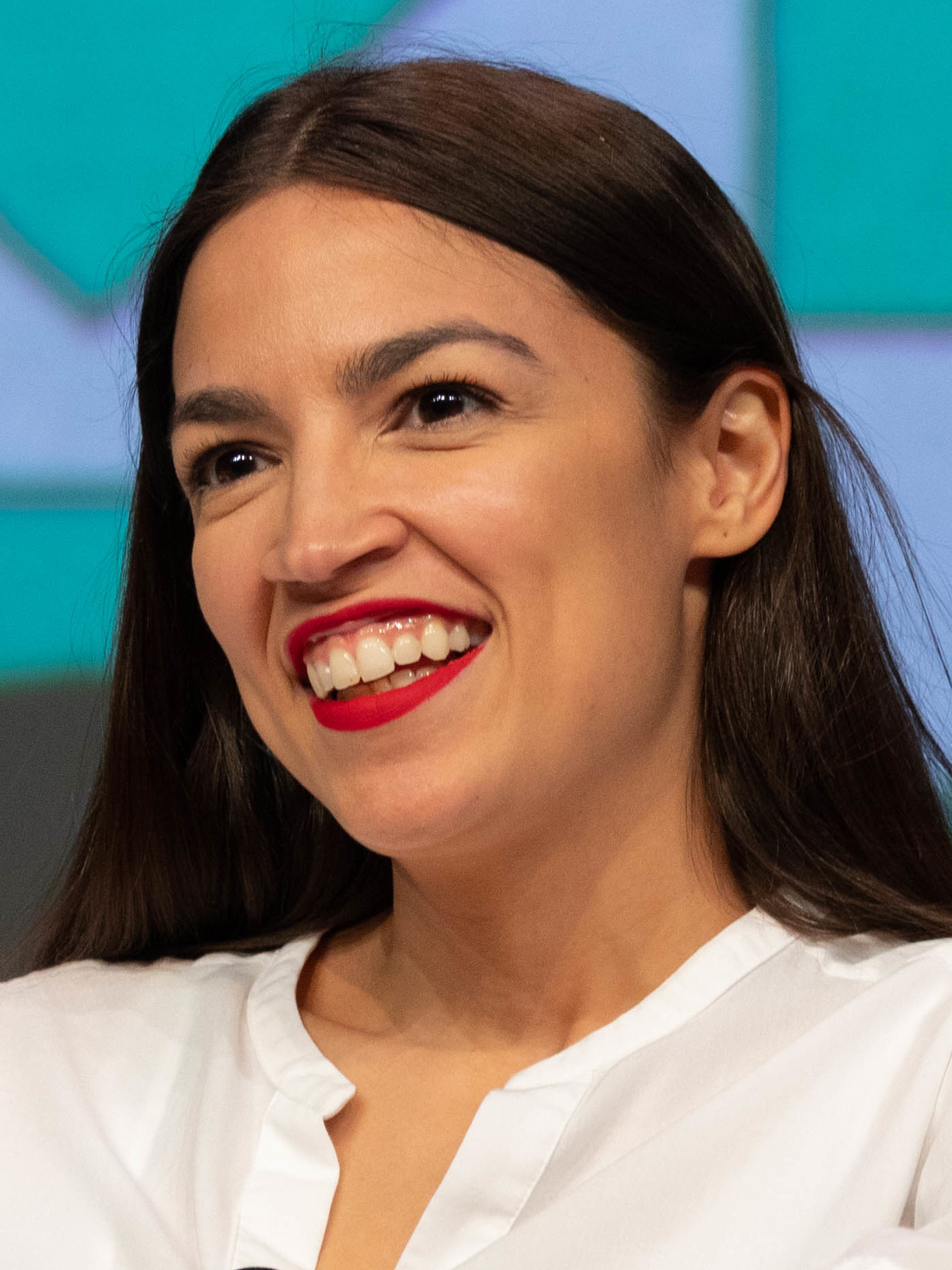
Ocasio-Cortez at the 2019 South by Southwest

In November 2018, on the first day of congressional orientation, Ocasio-Cortez participated in a climate change protest outside the office of House Minority Leader Nancy Pelosi. Also, in that month, she backed Pelosi's bid to be Speaker of the House once the Democratic Party reclaimed the majority on the condition that Pelosi "remains the most progressive candidate for speaker."

During the orientation for new members hosted by the John F. Kennedy School of Government, Ocasio-Cortez wrote on Twitter in December 2018 about the influence of corporate interests by sponsors such as the American Enterprise Institute and the Center for Strategic and International Studies: "Lobbyists are here. Goldman Sachs is here. Where's labor? Activists? Frontline community leaders?"

Taking office at age 29, Ocasio-Cortez became the youngest woman to serve in the United States Congress. She has been noted for her substantial social media presence relative to other Congress members.

Ocasio-Cortez is among the first female members of the Democratic Socialists of America elected to serve in Congress. She advocates a progressive platform that includes Medicare for All, a federal jobs guarantee, the Green New Deal, abolishing the U.S. Immigration and Customs Enforcement, free public college and trade school, and a 70% marginal tax rate on millionaire fortunes.

In January 2019, when Ocasio-Cortez made her first speech on the floor of Congress, C-SPAN tweeted the video. Within 12 hours, the video of her four-minute speech set the record as C-SPAN's most-watched Twitter video by a member of the House of Representatives.

Ocasio-Cortez's maiden speech as a representative, addressing the 2018–19 United States federal government shutdown

In an attempt to embarrass Ocasio-Cortez just before she took office, Twitter user "AnonymousQ" shared a video dating to Ocasio-Cortez's college years: a Boston University student-produced dance video in which she briefly appeared. Many social media users came to her defense, inspiring memes and a Twitter account syncing the footage to songs like "Mambo No. 5" and "Gangnam Style." Ocasio-Cortez responded by posting a lighthearted video of herself dancing to Edwin Starr's "War" outside her congressional office.

In 2019, Elizabeth Warren wrote the entry on Ocasio-Cortez for that year's Time 100. In January 2019, the documentary Knock Down the House, which focuses on four female Democrats in the 2018 United States elections who were not career politicians, including Ocasio-Cortez, Amy Vilela, Cori Bush, and Paula Jean Swearengin, premiered at the 2019 Sundance Film Festival. Ocasio-Cortez was the only one of the women featured to win. Two years later, Swearengin won the Democratic primary for the 2020 United States Senate election in West Virginia, and Bush won the Democratic primary for MO-01. Knock Down the House was released by Netflix on May 1, 2019.

When the 116th Congress convened on January 3, 2019, Ocasio-Cortez entered with no seniority but with a large social media presence. Axios has credited her with "as much social media clout as her fellow freshman Democrats combined." As of June 2020, she had 7.3 million Twitter followers, surpassing Nancy Pelosi, and several times the population of her congressional district. She had 2.2 million Instagram followers as of January 2019 and 500,000 followers on Facebook as of February 2019. Her colleagues appointed her to teach them social media lessons upon her arrival in Congress. In early July 2019, two lawsuits were filed against her for blocking Joseph Saladino and Dov Hikind on Twitter in light of the Second Circuit Court of Appeals ruling that it was a violation of the First Amendment for President Trump to block people on Twitter. On November 4, 2019, it was announced that they settled the lawsuit with Ocasio-Cortez issuing a statement apologizing for the Twitter block.

In an interview with the Yahoo! News podcast Skullduggery, Ocasio-Cortez said she had stopped using her private Facebook account and was minimizing her usage of all social media accounts and platforms, calling them a "public health risk".
