= Knock Down the House =

2019 documentary film by Rachel Lears

- Official poster
- Directed by: Rachel Lears
- Written by: Rachel Lears; Robin Blotnick
- Produced by: Rachel Lears; Robin Blotnick; Sarah Olson
- Starring: Alexandria Ocasio-Cortez; Amy Vilela; Cori Bush; Paula Jean Swearengin
- Cinematography: Rachel Lears
- Edited by: Robin Blotnick
- Music by: Ryan Blotnick
- Production companies: Jubilee Films; Atlas Films; Artemis Rising Films
- Distributed by: Netflix
- Release dates: January 27, 2019 (Sundance); May 1, 2019 (United States)
- Running time: 86 minutes
- Country: United States
- Language: English

Knock Down the House is a 2019 American documentary film directed by Rachel Lears. It revolves around the 2018 congressional primary campaigns of Alexandria Ocasio-Cortez, Amy Vilela, Cori Bush and Paula Jean Swearengin, four progressive Democrats endorsed by Justice Democrats and Brand New Congress who ran in that year's midterm elections.

The film had its world premiere at the 2019 Sundance Film Festival on January 27, 2019. It was released on May 1, 2019, by Netflix and received acclaim from critics.

== Synopsis ==
The film follows four female Democrats who decided to run for Congress in the 2018 United States elections: Alexandria Ocasio-Cortez of New York, Amy Vilela of Nevada, Cori Bush of Missouri, and Paula Jean Swearengin of West Virginia. The film charts their campaigns in their respective Democratic primaries. The four candidates each run grassroots campaigns against long-time incumbents. Vilela, Bush, and Swearengin lost their primary elections, but Ocasio-Cortez won her primary and went on to win the general election.

- However, two years later in 2020, during the next Congressional election cycle, Bush went on to win her primary and the general election in Missouri's 1st congressional district. Swearengin was the Democratic nominee for West Virginia's Senate race, where she lost to the incumbent by over 40 points. Four years later in 2024, Bush also lost renomination.

=== Candidates ===
- Alexandria Ocasio-Cortez (New York's 14th congressional district)
- Amy Vilela (Nevada's 4th congressional district)
- Cori Bush (Missouri's 1st congressional district)
- Paula Jean Swearengin (United States Senate – West Virginia, Class 1)

== Production ==
The day after Donald Trump's election, Rachel Lears began working on her new documentary film. She reached out to organizations such as Brand New Congress and Justice Democrats to find "charismatic female candidates who weren't career politicians, but had become newly galvanized to represent their communities." The search led her to four female candidates: Alexandria Ocasio-Cortez of New York, Amy Vilela of Nevada, Cori Bush of Missouri, and Paula Jean Swearengin of West Virginia. Lears raised $28,111 for the project through Kickstarter.

== Release ==
The film had its world premiere at the 2019 Sundance Film Festival on January 27, 2019. Shortly after, Netflix acquired distribution rights to the film for $10 million, beating out studios and streamers including Hulu, Neon, Focus Features and Amazon Studios. The film was also screened at the True/False Film Festival, the Athena Film Festival, the South by Southwest, the Full Frame Documentary Film Festival, and the Hot Docs Canadian International Documentary Festival. It was released on May 1, 2019. It was uploaded to YouTube by Netflix on April 17, 2020.

== Reception ==
=== Critical response ===
On review aggregator website Rotten Tomatoes, the film holds an approval rating from critics of 99% based on 103 reviews, with an average rating of 7.70/10. The website's critical consensus reads, "A galvanizing glimpse behind the scenes of a pivotal election, Knock Down the House should prove engrossing for viewers of all political persuasions." On Metacritic, which assigns a normalized rating to reviews, the film has a weighted average score of 80 out of 100, based on 20 critics, indicating "generally favorable" reviews.

Kate Erbland of IndieWire gave the film a grade of B, saying, "Stylistically, the film isn't at all fussy: on-screen graphics are straightforward and informative, and Lears leaves the editorializing out of her introductory captions, though the film's score often proves manipulative during the most unnecessary of times." Amy Nicholson of Variety wrote, "That Lears and co-writer Robin Blotnick made a real movie with intelligent camerawork and storytelling on a budget so small that they each pulled double duty as DP and editor, respectively, is a tribute to the energy of every woman who pledged that in 2018 they would make a difference." Leslie Felperin of The Hollywood Reporter called it "a pretty extraordinary cinematic artifact." Jordan Hoffman of The Guardian gave the film 4 out of 5 stars, saying, "While this is not Frederick Wiseman-esque pure 'direct cinema' there are enough sequences that lean into that fly-on-the-wall type of film-making." Nick Allen of RogerEbert.com gave the film 3 out of 4 stars and described it as "a worthwhile reminder for American citizens of the importance of making one's voice heard." Peter Travers of Rolling Stone, who gave the film 4 out of 5 stars, wrote, "The fighting spirit of this female quartet blazes through every frame of this galvanizing film." Richard Roeper of Chicago Sun-Times gave the film 4 out of 4 stars, calling it "stirring and inspirational".

=== Accolades ===
Award	Date of ceremony	Category	Recipient(s)	Result	Ref(s)
Sundance Film Festival	February 2, 2019	U.S. Documentary Audience Award	Knock Down the House	Won	
Sundance Film Festival	February 2, 2019	Festival Favorite Award	Knock Down the House	Won	
Critics' Choice Documentary Awards	November 10, 2019	Best Documentary	Knock Down the House	Nominated	
Critics' Choice Documentary Awards	November 10, 2019	Best Political Documentary	Knock Down the House	Nominated	
Critics' Choice Documentary Awards	November 10, 2019	Most Compelling Living Subject of a Documentary	Alexandria Ocasio-Cortez, Amy Vilela, Cori Bush, and Paula Jean Swearengin	Won	
Cinema Eye Honors	January 6, 2020	Audience Choice Prize	Knock Down the House	Nominated	
Cinema Eye Honors	January 6, 2020	The Unforgettables	Alexandria Ocasio-Cortez	Won	
Black Reel Awards	February 6, 2020	Outstanding Documentary	Knock Down the House	Nominated	

== See also ==
- Surge (2020 American film) – a similarly themed documentary about women running for Congress in the 2018 United States elections
