= Gümüşay =

Gümüşay is a surname. Notable people with the surname include:

- Gülşah Gümüşay (born 1989), Turkish basketball player
- Kübra Gümüşay (born 1988), German writer and activist
