= 2018 United States House of Representatives elections in Nevada =

- November 6, 2018

All 4 Nevada seats to the United States House of Representatives
	Majority party	Minority party
Party	Democratic	Republican
Last election	3	1
Seats won	3	1
Seat change	Steady	Steady
Popular vote	491,272	439,727
Percentage	51.13%	45.77%
Swing	▲4.02%	▼0.42%

Democratic
50–60%
60–70%
Republican
50–60%
60–70%
70–80%
80–90%

The 2018 United States House of Representatives elections in Nevada were held on November 6, 2018, to elect the four U.S. representatives from the State of Nevada, one from each of the state's four congressional districts. The elections coincided with the Nevada gubernatorial election, as well as other elections to the United States House of Representatives, elections to the United States Senate and various state and local elections. Primary elections were held on June 12, 2018.

== Overview ==
=== Statewide ===
Party	Candidates	Votes		Seats		
Party	Candidates	No.	%	No.	+/–	%
Democratic	4	491,272	51.13	3	Steady	75.00
Republican	4	439,727	45.77	1	Steady	25.00
Independent	5	11,830	1.23	0	Steady	0.0
Independent American	3	9,115	0.95	0	Steady	0.0
Libertarian	3	8,830	0.92	0	Steady	0.0
Total	19	960,774	100.0	4	Steady	100.0

Popular vote
Democratic	51.13%
Republican	45.77%
Other	3.10%

House seats
Democratic	75.00%
Republican	25.00%

=== By district ===
Results of the 2018 United States House of Representatives elections in Nevada by district:

District	Democratic		Republican		Others		Total		Result
District	Votes	%	Votes	%	Votes	%	Votes	%	Result
District 1	100,707	66.17%	46,978	30.86%	4,516	2.97%	152,201	100.0%	Democratic hold
District 2	120,102	41.77%	167,435	58.23%	0	0.00%	287,537	100.0%	Republican Hold
District 3	148,501	51.89%	122,566	42.83%	15,101	5.28%	286,168	100.0%	Democratic hold
District 4	121,962	51.93%	102,748	43.75%	10,158	4.32%	234,868	100.0%	Democratic hold
Total	491,272	51.13%	439,727	45.77%	29,775	3.10%	960,774	100.0%	

== District 1 ==
2018 Nevada's 1st congressional district election
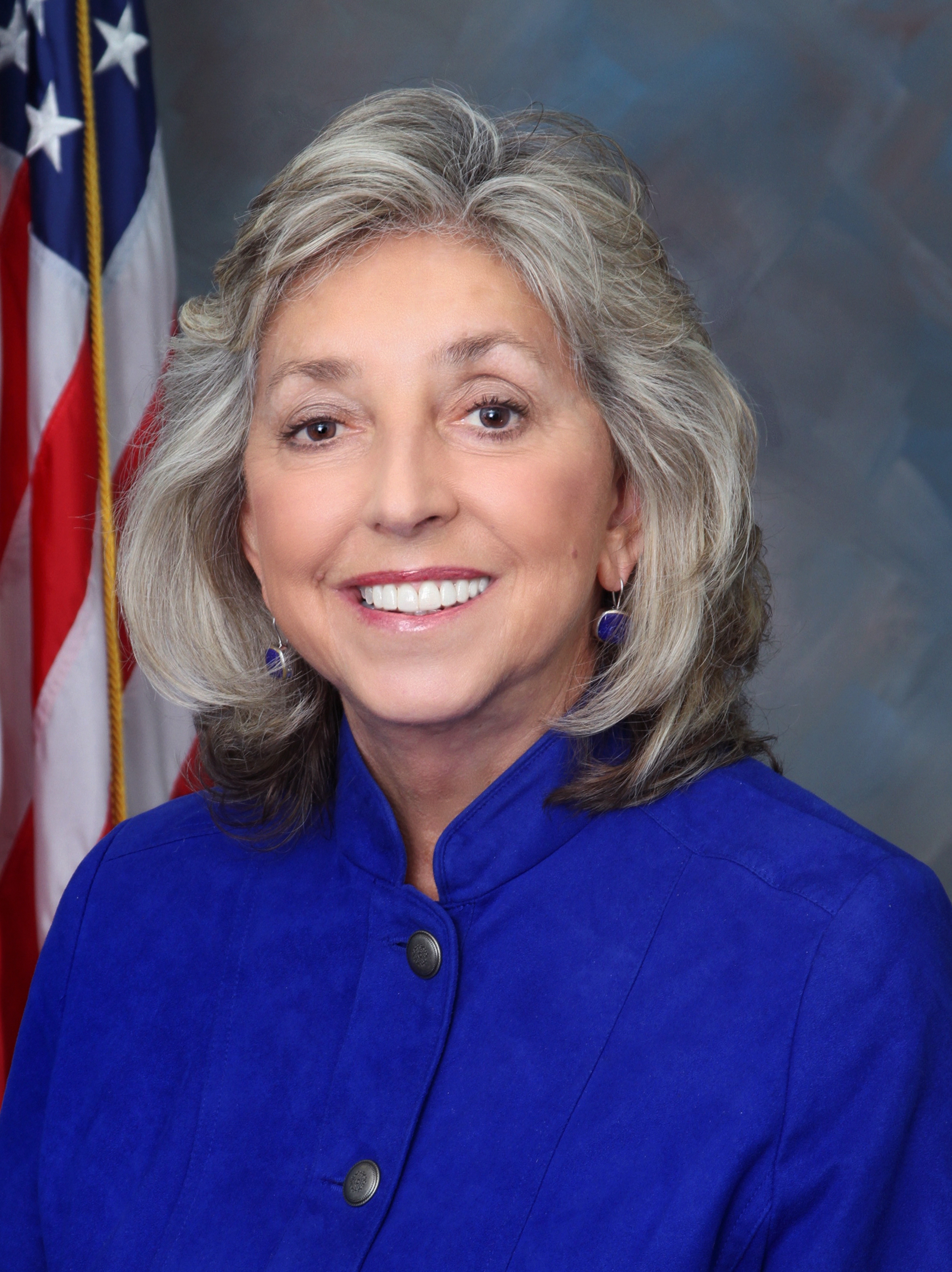

Nominee	Dina Titus	Joyce Bentley
Party	Democratic	Republican
Popular vote	100,707	46,978
Percentage	66.2%	30.9%
- Titus: 40–50% 50–60% 60–70% 70–80% 80–90% >90% Bentley: 40–50% 50–60% 60–70% >90% No votes
U.S. Representative before election
Dina Titus
Democratic
Elected U.S. Representative
Dina Titus
Democratic

Nevada's 1st congressional district occupies the southeastern half of Nevada's largest city, Las Vegas, as well as parts of North Las Vegas and parts of unincorporated Clark County. Incumbent Democrat Dina Titus, who had represented the district since 2013 and previously represented the 3rd district from 2009 to 2011, ran for re-election. She was re-elected with 62% of the vote in 2016, and the district had a PVI of D+15.

=== Democratic primary ===
==== Candidates ====
===== Nominee =====
- Dina Titus, incumbent U.S. Representative

===== Eliminated in primary =====
- Reuben D'Silva, teacher, former U.S. Marine and Independent candidate for this seat in 2016

==== Endorsements ====
Dina Titus

Labor unions

- AFL-CIO

==== Primary results ====
Democratic primary results
Party	Candidate	Votes	%
Democratic	Dina Titus (incumbent)	20,897	78.7
Democratic	Reuben D'Silva	5,659	21.3
Total votes		26,556	100.0

=== Republican primary ===
==== Candidates ====
===== Nominee =====
- Joyce Bentley, banker, realtor and small business owner

===== Eliminated in primary =====
- Freddy Horne, educator, Vietnam veteran and candidate for this seat in 2016

===== Withdrawn =====
- D'Nese Davis, artist, teacher and candidate for U.S. Senate in 2016

==== Primary results ====
Republican primary results
Party	Candidate	Votes	%
Republican	Joyce Bentley	6,444	55.2
Republican	Fred Horne	5,235	44.8
Total votes		11,679	100.0

=== General election ===
==== Predictions ====
Source	Ranking	As of
The Cook Political Report	Safe D	November 5, 2018
Inside Elections	Safe D	November 5, 2018
Sabato's Crystal Ball	Safe D	November 5, 2018
RCP	Safe D	November 5, 2018
Daily Kos	Safe D	November 5, 2018
538	Safe D	November 7, 2018
CNN	Safe D	October 31, 2018
Politico	Safe D	November 2, 2018

==== Endorsements ====
Dina Titus (D)

Labor unions

- AFL-CIO

Newspapers

- Las Vegas Review-Journal
- Las Vegas Sun
Robert Van Strawder (L)

Individuals

- Shock G, rapper

==== Polling ====
Poll source	Date(s) administered	Sample size	Margin of error	Dina Titus (D)	Joyce Bentley (R)	Other	Undecided
Emerson College	November 1–4, 2018	238	± 6.6%	58%	28%	7%	7%
Emerson College	October 10–12, 2018	121	± 9.2%	50%	20%	4%	26%

==== Results ====
Nevada's 1st congressional district, 2018
Party	Candidate	Votes	%
Democratic	Dina Titus (incumbent)	100,707	66.2
Republican	Joyce Bentley	46,978	30.9
Independent American	Dan Garfield	2,454	1.6
Libertarian	Robert Van Strawder Jr.	2,062	1.3
Total votes		152,201	100.0
Democratic hold			

== District 2 ==
2018 Nevada's 2nd congressional district election
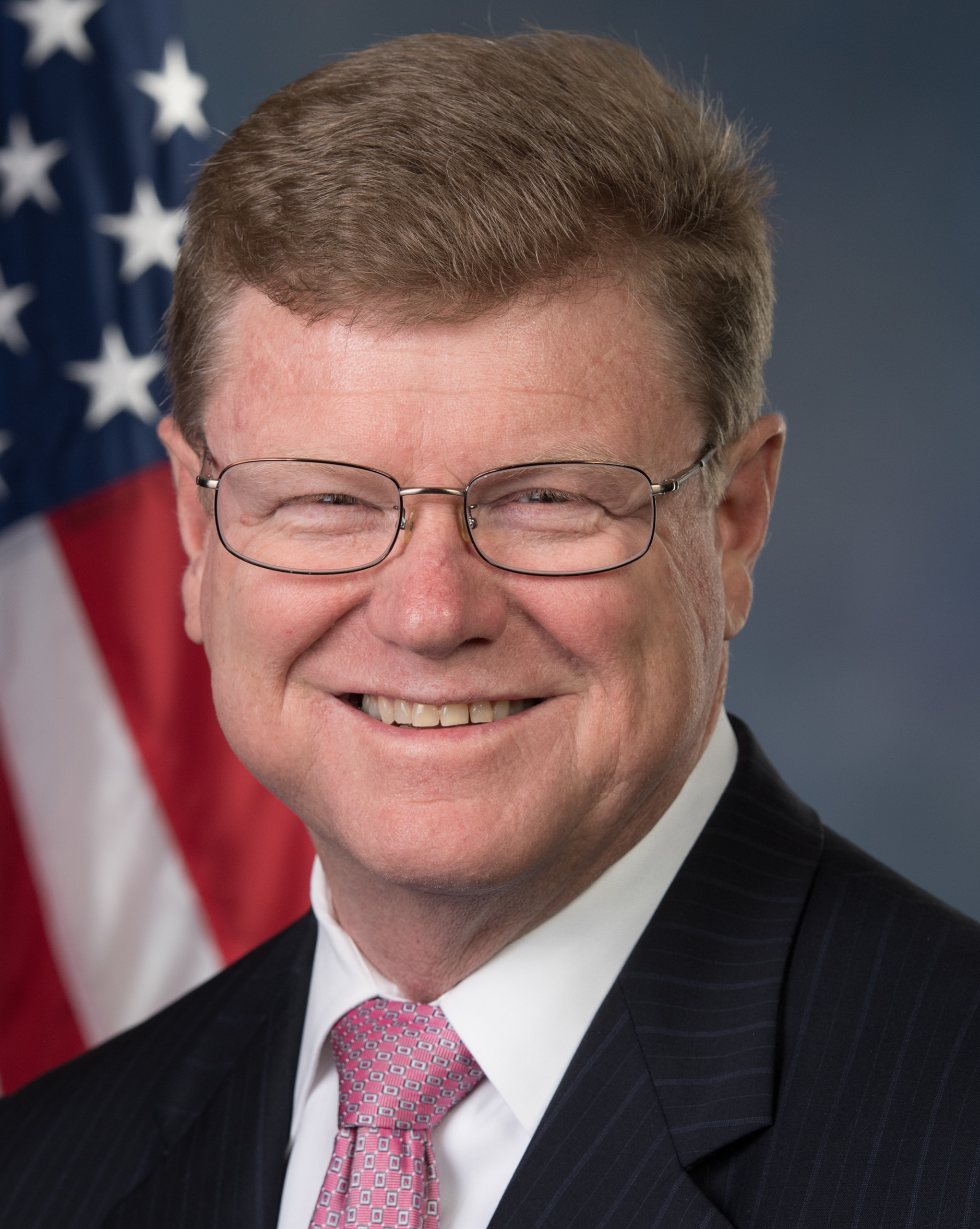

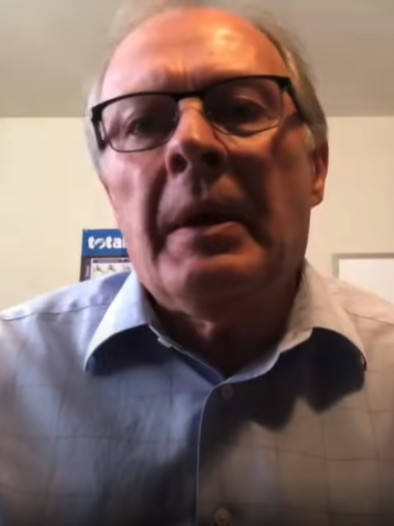
Nominee	Mark Amodei	Clint Koble
Party	Republican	Democratic
Popular vote	167,435	120,102
Percentage	58.2%	41.8%
- Amodei: 50–60% 60–70% 70–80% 80–90% >90% Koble: 50–60% 60–70% 70–80% 80–90% >90% Tie: 50% No votes
U.S. Representative before election
Mark Amodei
Republican
Elected U.S. Representative
Mark Amodei
Republican

Nevada's 2nd congressional district includes the northern third of the state. It includes most of Douglas County and Lyon County, all of Churchill County, Elko County, Eureka County, Humboldt County, Pershing County and Washoe County, as well as the state capital, Carson City. The largest city in the district is Reno, the state's second largest city. Although the district appears rural, its politics are dominated by Reno and Carson City, which combined cast over 85 percent of the district's vote. Incumbent Republican Mark Amodei, who had represented the district since 2011, ran for re-election. He was re-elected with 58% of the vote in 2016, and the district had a PVI of R+7.

=== Republican primary ===
Amodei faced a primary challenge from far-right former Senate nominee Sharron Angle.

==== Candidates ====
===== Nominee =====
- Mark Amodei, incumbent U.S. Representative

===== Eliminated in primary =====
- Sharron Angle, former state assembly member, nominee for the U.S. Senate in 2010, candidate in 2016 and candidate for this seat in 2006
- Joel Beck, commercial pilot
- Ian Luetkehans

==== Primary results ====
Republican primary results
Party	Candidate	Votes	%
Republican	Mark Amodei (incumbent)	42,335	71.7
Republican	Sharron Angle	10,829	18.3
Republican	Joel Beck	5,002	8.5
Republican	Ian Luetkehans	881	1.5
Total votes		59,047	100.0

=== Democratic primary ===
Clint Koble, former Nevada State Executive Director of the Farm Service Agency of the USDA, announced he was running for the Democratic nomination in November 2017.

==== Candidates ====
===== Nominee =====
- Clint Koble, former Nevada State Executive Director of the Farm Service Agency of the USDA

===== Eliminated in primary =====
- Vance Alm, physician and candidate for this seat in 2014 & 2016
- Patrick Fogarty, entrepreneur
- Jesse Hurley
- Jack Schofield Jr.
- Rick Shepherd, small business owner and candidate for this seat in 2016

==== Primary results ====
Democratic primary results
Party	Candidate	Votes	%
Democratic	Clint Koble	9,451	26.1
Democratic	Patrick Fogarty	8,614	23.8
Democratic	Rick Shepherd	7,696	21.3
Democratic	Vance Alm	4,781	13.2
Democratic	Jesse Hurley	2,907	8.0
Democratic	Jack Schofield Jr.	2,711	7.5
Total votes		36,160	100.0

=== General election ===
==== Predictions ====
Source	Ranking	As of
The Cook Political Report	Safe R	November 5, 2018
Inside Elections	Safe R	November 5, 2018
Sabato's Crystal Ball	Safe R	November 5, 2018
RCP	Safe R	November 5, 2018
Daily Kos	Safe R	November 5, 2018
538	Safe R	November 7, 2018
CNN	Safe R	October 31, 2018
Politico	Safe R	November 4, 2018

==== Polling ====
Poll source	Date(s) administered	Sample size	Margin of error	Mark Amodei (R)	Clint Koble (D)	Undecided
Emerson College	November 1–4, 2018	365	± 5.3%	58%	37%	6%
Emerson College	October 10–12, 2018	169	± 7.8%	23%	16%	61%

==== Results ====
Nevada's 2nd congressional district, 2018
Party	Candidate	Votes	%
Republican	Mark Amodei (incumbent)	167,435	58.2
Democratic	Clint Koble	120,102	41.8
Total votes		287,537	100.0
Republican hold			

== District 3 ==
2018 Nevada's 3rd congressional district election
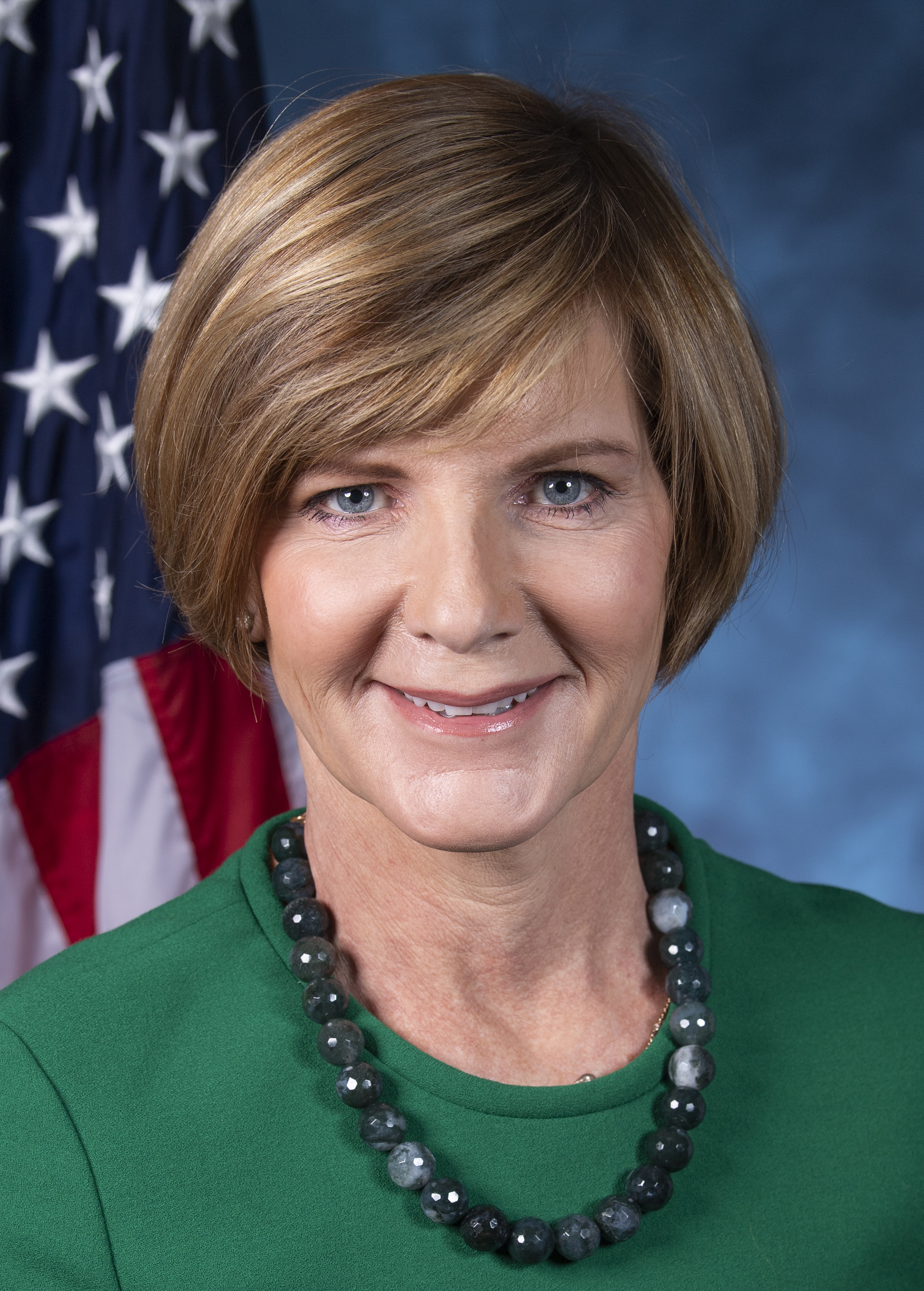

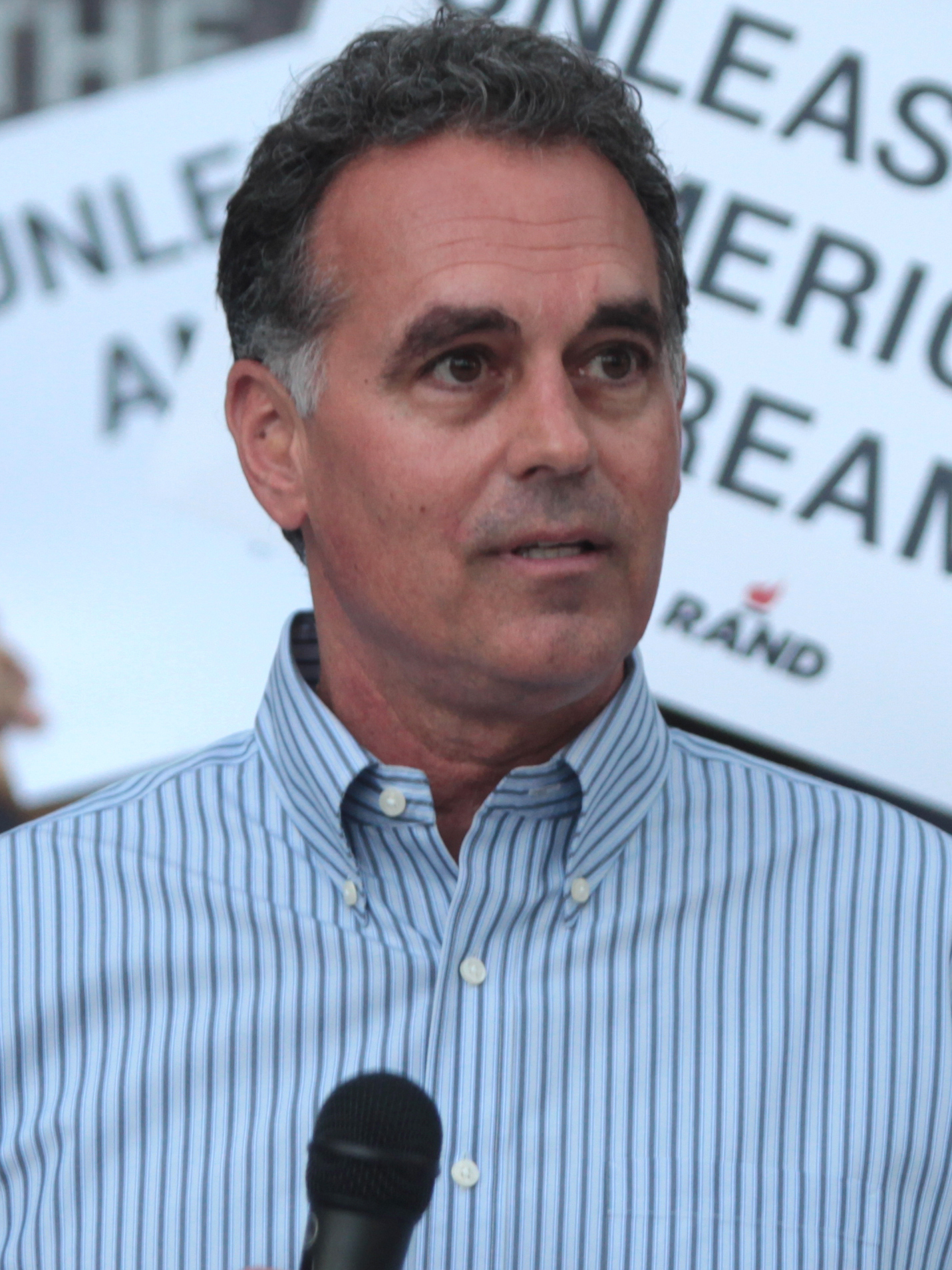
Nominee	Susie Lee	Danny Tarkanian
Party	Democratic	Republican
Popular vote	148,501	122,566
Percentage	51.9%	42.8%
- Precinct results Lee: 40–50% 50–60% 60–70% 70–80% >90% Tarkanian: 40–50% 50–60% 60–70% 70–80% 80–90% >90% Tie: 40–50% 50% No votes
U.S. Representative before election
Jacky Rosen
Democratic
Elected U.S. Representative
Susie Lee
Democratic

The 3rd congressional district occupies the area south of Las Vegas, including Henderson, and most of unincorporated Clark County and was created after the 2000 United States census. Incumbent Democrat Jacky Rosen, who had represented the district since 2017, did not run for re-election; instead she ran against Dean Heller in the U.S. Senate election. She was elected with 47% of the vote in 2016, and the district had a PVI of R+2.

=== Democratic primary ===
==== Candidates ====
===== Nominee =====
- Susie Lee, philanthropist, president of the board of the Communities In Schools of Nevada and candidate for the 4th district in 2016

===== Eliminated in primary =====
- Richard Hart
- Jack Love, insurance agent
- Guy Pinjuv
- Steve Schiffman, attorney, former USAID Foreign Service Officer and chair of the Partnership for Judicial Progress
- Eric Stoltz
- Michael Weiss, database administrator and reports developer

===== Withdrawn =====
- Hermon Farahi

===== Declined =====
- Nicole Cannizzaro, state senator
- Teresa Lowry, former Clark County assistant district attorney and candidate for state senate in 2014
- Jacky Rosen, incumbent U.S. Representative (ran for U.S. Senate)
- Joyce Woodhouse, state senator

==== Primary results ====
Democratic primary results
Party	Candidate	Votes	%
Democratic	Susie Lee	25,474	66.9
Democratic	Michael Weiss	3,115	8.2
Democratic	Eric Stoltz	2,758	7.2
Democratic	Jack Love	2,208	5.8
Democratic	Richard Hart	1,847	4.9
Democratic	Steve Schiffman	1,338	3.5
Democratic	Guy Pinjuv	1,331	3.5
Total votes		38,071	100.0

=== Republican primary ===
==== Candidates ====
===== Nominee =====
- Danny Tarkanian, businessman, former attorney and perennial candidate (previously ran for U.S. Senate)

===== Eliminated in primary =====
- Patrick Carter, member of the Nevada System of Higher Education Board of Regents
- Eddie Hamilton, retired auto executive and perennial candidate
- Scott Hammond, state senator
- Stephanie Jones
- Thomas Mark La Croix, publisher, author and lecturer
- David McKeon, former chair of the Clark County Republican Party
- Michelle Mortenson, former KLAS-TV, Channel 8 consumer reporter
- Annette Teijeiro, physician, nominee for the 1st district in 2014 and candidate for this seat in 2016

===== Withdrawn =====
- Jim Murphy, Independent candidate for this seat in 2012
- Victoria Seaman, former state assembly member and candidate for state senate in 2016 (dropped out after Danny Tarkanian entered race)

===== Declined =====
- Cresent Hardy, former U.S. Representative (ran in the 4th district)
- Michael Roberson, Minority Leader of the Nevada Senate and candidate for this seat in 2016

==== Endorsements ====
Scott Hammond

Organizations

- NRA Political Victory Fund
David McKeon

State legislators

- Chris Edwards, state assembly member
Danny Tarkanian

State officials

- Lorraine Hunt-Bono, former lieutenant governor
- Adam Laxalt, Attorney General of Nevada

Organizations

- National Right to Life Committee

==== Primary results ====
Republican primary results
Party	Candidate	Votes	%
Republican	Danny Tarkanian	15,257	44.1
Republican	Michelle Mortensen	8,491	24.6
Republican	Scott Hammond	5,804	16.8
Republican	David McKeon	1,698	4.9
Republican	Annette Teijeiro	1,225	3.5
Republican	Patrick Carter	942	2.7
Republican	Stephanie Jones	450	1.3
Republican	Eddie Hamilton	360	1.0
Republican	Thomas La Croix	345	1.0
Total votes		34,572	100.0

=== General election ===
==== Endorsements ====
Susie Lee (D)

Executive branch officials

- Joe Biden, 47th Vice President of the United States
- Barack Obama, 44th President of the United States

U.S. Senators

- Richard Bryan, former U.S. senator
- Catherine Cortez Masto, U.S. senator
- Harry Reid, former U.S. senator

U.S. Representatives

- Ruben Kihuen, U.S. representative
- Jacky Rosen, U.S. representative
- Dina Titus, U.S. representative

State officials

- Jay Inslee, Governor of Washington

State legislators

- Kelvin Atkinson, state senator
- Yvanna Cancela, state senator
- Nicole Cannizzaro, state senator
- Aaron D. Ford, state senate majority leader
- Jason Frierson, state assembly speaker
- Joyce Woodhouse, state senator

Labor unions

- AFL-CIO
- American Federation of Government Employees
- International Brotherhood of Electrical Workers
- Nevada State Education Association
- Service Employees International Union

Organizations

- Democratic Congressional Campaign Committee "Red to Blue" Program
- EMILY's List
- End Citizens United
- Giffords
- Human Rights Campaign
- League of Conservation Voters
- MoveOn
- NARAL Pro-Choice America
- New Democrat Coalition

Newspapers

- Las Vegas Sun
Danny Tarkanian (R)

Executive branch officials

- Donald Trump, 45th President of the United States

State officials

- Lorraine Hunt-Bono, former lieutenant governor
- Adam Laxalt, Attorney General of Nevada

Organizations

- National Republican Congressional Committee "Young Guns" Program
- National Right to Life Committee

Newspapers

- Las Vegas Review-Journal

==== Debate ====
2018 Nevada's 3rd congressional district debate
No.	Date	Host	Moderator	Link	Democratic	Republican
Key: P Participant A Absent N Not invited I Invited W Withdrawn						
Key: P Participant A Absent N Not invited I Invited W Withdrawn					Susie Lee	Danny Tarkanian
1	Sep. 29, 2018	KLAS-TV	Steve Sebelius; Patrick Walker		P	P

==== Polling ====
Poll source	Date(s) administered	Sample size	Margin of error	Susie Lee (D)	Danny Tarkanian (R)	Undecided
Emerson College	November 1–4, 2018	332	± 5.6%	51%	44%	3%
Emerson College	October 10–12, 2018	178	± 7.6%	41%	39%	18%

==== Predictions ====
Source	Ranking	As of
The Cook Political Report	Lean D	November 5, 2018
Inside Elections	Tilt D	November 5, 2018
Sabato's Crystal Ball	Lean D	November 5, 2018
RCP	Tossup	November 5, 2018
Daily Kos	Lean D	November 5, 2018
538	Likely D	November 7, 2018
CNN	Lean D	October 31, 2018
Politico	Likely D	November 2, 2018

==== Results ====
Nevada's 3rd congressional district, 2018
Party	Candidate	Votes	%
Democratic	Susie Lee	148,501	51.9
Republican	Danny Tarkanian	122,566	42.8
Libertarian	Steve Brown	4,555	1.6
Independent	David Goossen	3,627	1.3
Independent American	Harry Vickers	3,481	1.2
Independent	Gil Eisner	1,887	0.7
Independent	Tony Gumina	1,551	0.5
Total votes		286,168	100.0
Democratic hold			

== District 4 ==
2018 Nevada's 4th congressional district election
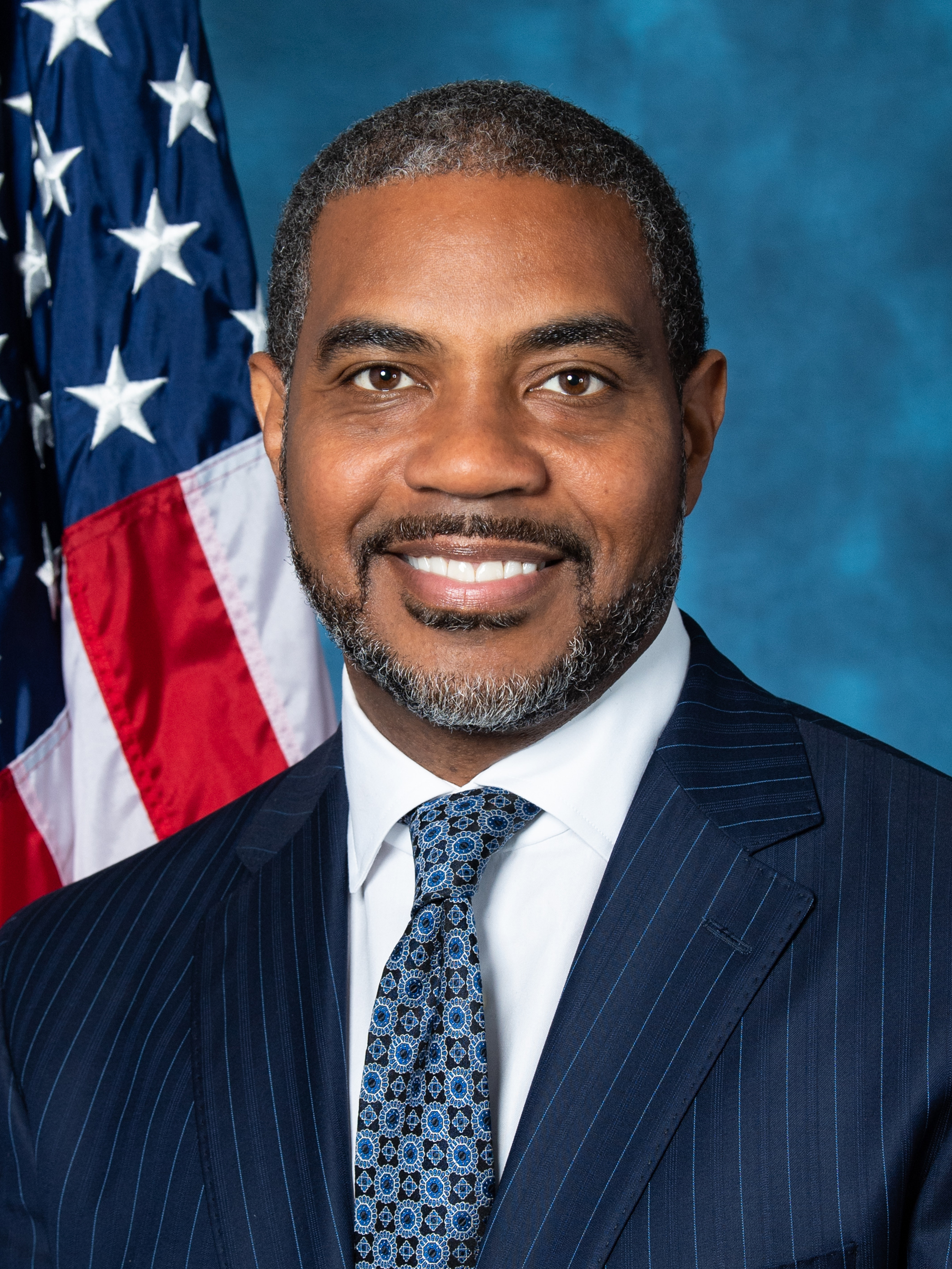

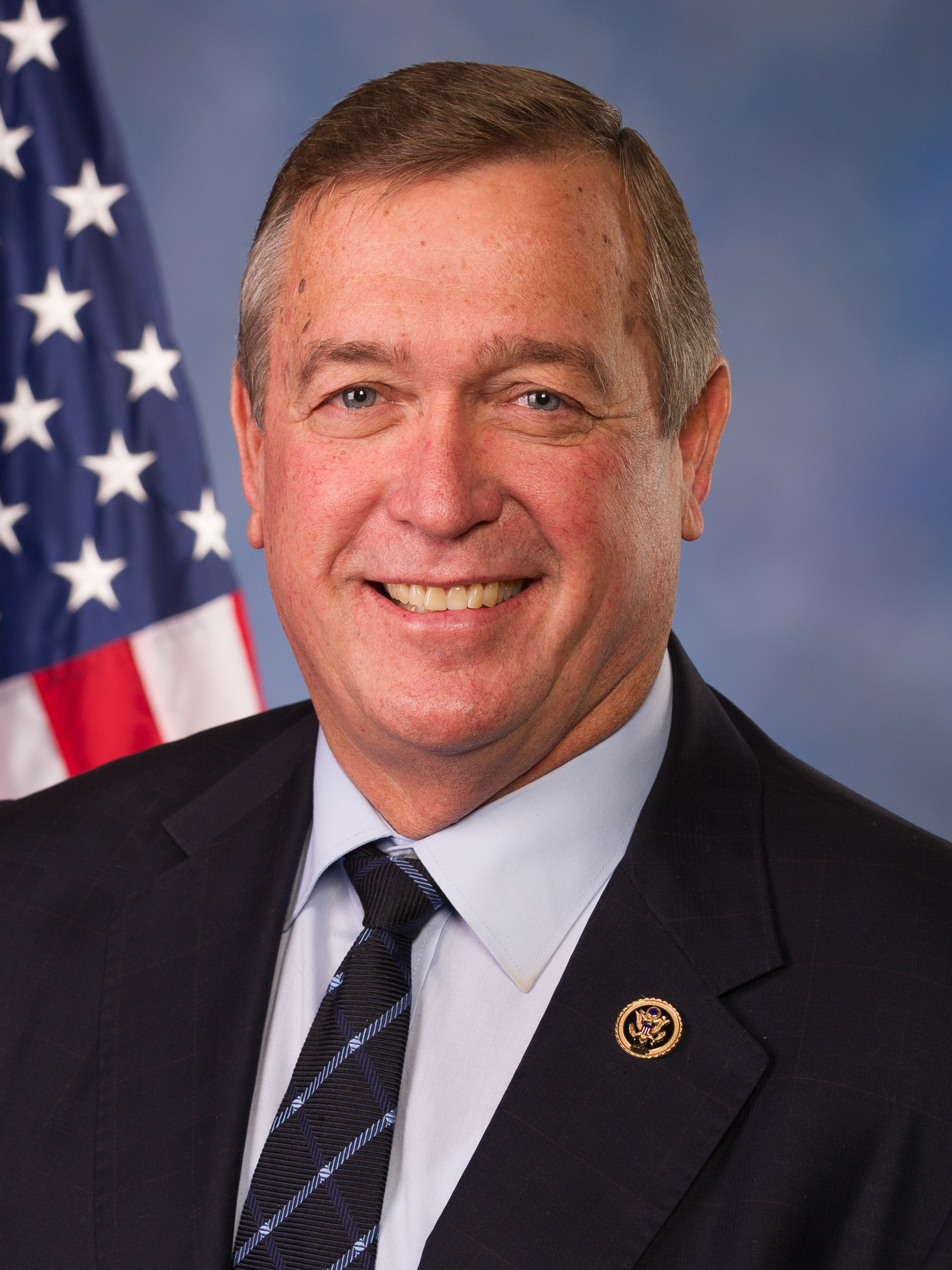
Nominee	Steven Horsford	Cresent Hardy
Party	Democratic	Republican
Popular vote	121,962	102,748
Percentage	51.9%	43.8%
- Horsford: 40–50% 50–60% 60–70% 70–80% 80–90% >90% Hardy: 40–50% 50–60% 60–70% 70–80% 80–90% >90% Tie: 40–50% No votes
U.S. Representative before election
Ruben Kihuen
Democratic
Elected U.S. Representative
Steven Horsford
Democratic

The 4th congressional district was created as a result of the 2010 United States census. Located in the central portion of the state, it includes most of northern Clark County, parts of Lyon County, and all of Esmeralda County, Lincoln County, Mineral County, Nye County and White Pine County. More than four-fifths of the district's population lives in Clark County. Incumbent Democrat Ruben Kihuen, who had represented the district since 2017, did not run for re-election. He was elected with 49% of the vote in 2016, and the district had a PVI of D+3.

=== Democratic primary ===
In December 2017, Kihuen announced that he would not seek re-election in 2018 following allegations of sexual harassment. At the time, the only candidate who filed to run against him in the primaries was Amy Vilela.

Former U.S. Representative for this district Steven Horsford, who was defeated in the 2014 election, as well as Nevada Legislator Pat Spearman, later announced their plans to run for the Democratic nomination for the seat several months later, following Kihuen's retirement announcement.

==== Candidates ====
===== Nominee =====
- Steven Horsford, former U.S. Representative

===== Eliminated in primary =====
- John Anzalone, high school principal
- Pat Spearman, state senator
- Amy Vilela, universal healthcare activist and Justice Democrats member
- Sid Zeller, retired Marine intelligence officer candidate for this seat in 2014 and Republican candidate for this seat in 2012

===== Declined =====
- Lucy Flores, former state assembly member, nominee for Lieutenant Governor in 2014 and candidate for this seat in 2016
- Ruben Kihuen, incumbent U.S. Representative

==== Endorsements ====
Steven Horsford

U.S. Executive Branch officials

- Joe Biden, 47th Vice President of the United States

Labor unions

- AFL-CIO (joint with Spearman)
Pat Spearman

Labor unions

- AFL-CIO (joint with Horsford)

Organizations

- National Organization for Women
- Victory Fund
- VoteVets
Amy Vilela

Labor unions

- National Nurses United

Organizations

- Brand New Congress
- Justice Democrats
- Our Revolution
- The People for Bernie Sanders

==== Debate ====
2018 Nevada's 4th congressional district democratic primary debate
No.	Date	Host	Moderator	Link	Democratic	Democratic	Democratic	Democratic	Democratic	Democratic
Key: P Participant A Absent N Not invited I Invited W Withdrawn										
Key: P Participant A Absent N Not invited I Invited W Withdrawn					John Anzalone	Steven Horsford	Pat Spearman	Allison Stephens	Amy Vilela	Sid Zeller
1	May 25, 2018	KTNV-TV	Todd Quinones; Jon Ralston		P	P	P	P	P	N

==== Primary results ====
Democratic primary results
Party	Candidate	Votes	%
Democratic	Steven Horsford	22,698	61.7
Democratic	Pat Spearman	5,607	15.2
Democratic	Amy Vilela	3,388	9.2
Democratic	Allison Stephens	2,215	6.0
Democratic	John Anzalone	2,132	5.8
Democratic	Sid Zeller	734	2.0
Total votes		36,774	100.0

=== Republican primary ===
==== Campaign ====
The Republican primary featured six candidates. The early frontrunner was Cresent Hardy, who faced questions about his hiring of Benjamin Sparks, a Las Vegas political adviser who allegedly sexually enslaved and battered his ex-fiancée.

==== Candidates ====
===== Nominee =====
- Cresent Hardy, former U.S. Representative

===== Eliminated in primary =====
- Dave Gibbs, program director of Battlespace, Inc.
- Jeff Miller, businessman and candidate for this seat in 2016
- Mike Monroe, candidate for this seat in 2016
- Allison Stephens
- Bill Townsend, entrepreneur
- Kenneth Wegner, retired Army veteran, nominee for the 1st district in 2006, 2008 & 2010 and candidate for this seat in 2012

===== Withdrawn =====
- Stavros Anthony, Las Vegas council member (dropped out for health reasons)

===== Declined =====
- Scott Hammond, state senator

==== Primary results ====
Republican primary results
Party	Candidate	Votes	%
Republican	Cresent Hardy	15,252	47.4
Republican	David Gibbs	6,098	19.0
Republican	Bill Townsend	3,659	11.4
Republican	Kenneth Wegner	3,625	11.3
Republican	Jeff Miller	2,560	8.0
Republican	Mike Monroe	971	3.0
Total votes		32,165	100.0

=== Libertarian primary ===
==== Candidates ====
===== Nominee =====
- Greg Luckner

===== Declined =====
- Steve Brown, nominee for this seat in 2014 and 2016 and candidate for the U.S. Senate in Nevada in 2012

=== General election ===
==== Campaign ====
This was a rematch of the 2014 election where Hardy upset Horsford to win, by just over 3,500 votes, in what was a strong year for Republicans nationally.

==== Endorsements ====
Steven Horsford (D)

Executive branch officials

- Joe Biden, 47th Vice President of the United States
- Barack Obama, 44th President of the United States

U.S. Senators

- Brian Schatz, U.S. Senator (D-HI)

Labor unions

- AFL-CIO

Organizations

- Democratic Congressional Campaign Committee "Red to Blue" Program
- End Citizens United
- MoveOn

Newspapers

- Las Vegas Sun
Cresent Hardy (R)

Organizations

- Las Vegas Asian Chamber of Commerce
- National Republican Congressional Committee "Young Guns" Program
- Republican Main Street Partnership

Newspapers

- Las Vegas Review-Journal

==== Polling ====
Poll source	Date(s) administered	Sample size	Margin of error	Steven Horsford (D)	Cresent Hardy (R)	Other	Undecided
Emerson College	November 1–4, 2018	263	± 6.3%	48%	44%	5%	3%
Emerson College	October 10–12, 2018	157	± 8.1%	36%	34%	7%	23%
Moore Information (R)	October 3–8, 2018	400	± 5.0%	37%	41%	10%	13%
Moore Information (R-Hardy)	August 4–7, 2018	400	± 5.0%	41%	41%	1%	17%
Global Strategy Group (D-Horsford)	July 17–22, 2018	500	± 4.4%	49%	40%	–	11%
DCCC (D)	January 5–9, 2018	400	–	42%	37%	–	21%

==== Predictions ====
Source	Ranking	As of
The Cook Political Report	Lean D	November 5, 2018
Inside Elections	Lean D	November 5, 2018
Sabato's Crystal Ball	Likely D	November 5, 2018
RCP	Tossup	November 5, 2018
Daily Kos	Lean D	November 5, 2018
538	Likely D	November 7, 2018
CNN	Lean D	October 31, 2018
Politico	Lean D	November 2, 2018

==== Results ====
Nevada's 4th congressional district, 2018
Party	Candidate	Votes	%
Democratic	Steven Horsford	121,962	51.9
Republican	Cresent Hardy	102,748	43.8
Independent American	Warren Markowitz	3,180	1.3
Independent	Rodney Smith	2,733	1.2
Libertarian	Greg Luckner	2,213	0.9
Independent	Dean McGonigle	2,032	0.9
Total votes		234,868	100.0
Democratic hold			
