= Brand New Congress =

Former American political action committee

- Founded: 2016
- Founders: Saikat Chakrabarti; Zack Exley; Stacey Hopkins; Alexandra Rojas; Corbin Trent
- Dissolved: 2023
- Executive Director: Adrienne Bell
- Website: brandnewcongress.org

Brand New Congress was an American political action committee with the mission to elect hundreds of new progressive congressional representatives in line with the campaign's political platform.

== Background ==
Brand New Congress was a volunteer-led American political organization that intends to run hundreds of campaigns for United States Congress with candidates of the organization's choosing by the 2018 midterm elections, regardless of party affiliation. The organization planned to make staffing and fundraising decisions for all its candidates at once. About 20 volunteers from Bernie Sanders's 2016 presidential campaign formed the group in April 2016 as Sanders conceded the primary to Hillary Clinton. They planned the organization to support Sanders's platform and carry its supporters' momentum into policymaking. (Note: Sanders also announced his own organization to run progressive candidates, Our Revolution.)

Brand New Congress planned to announce 50 candidates by March 2017 and over 400 by July 2017. Of the 535 total seats in the United States Congress (House and Senate), 468 were up for reelection in 2018. The group ran both Democratic and Republican candidates, depending on regional demographics, as well as independents when an incumbent wins the primary. Brand New Congress required candidates to align with Sanders's presidential platform, regardless of party affiliation. While there are large differences in Republican and Democratic policies, Brand New Congress hopes that people will unify under the goal of reforming Congress.

The grassroots are better qualified to run electoral campaigns than Democratic party operatives ... They just need to be given the tools, the data, the offices and the structure to succeed.

— Zack Exley, former Sanders advisor and a founding member of Brand New Congress

The group attended the July 2016 Democratic National Convention to canvass for support in protester sites and throughout the city. By then the group had raised $85,000, about 90% of it in small donations. Its email list contained 20,000 addresses. Brand New Congress began a tour of 100 cities in mid-2016. Founding members of the group were encouraged by the success of the Sanders campaign's grassroots fundraising, which surpassed the Clinton campaign's several times in monthly income. As of October 2016, the group was accepting nominations for future candidates and openly developing its economic platform. In March 2017, Brand New Congress announced that it had teamed up with Justice Democrats to further its goals.

On March 14, 2023, Brand New Congress announced that it would cease operations.

== Candidates ==
=== 2018 ===
In the 2018 primary season, Brand New Congress officially endorsed 30 candidates:

Candidate	State	Party	Office	Primary date	Primary result	%	General result	%
Robb Ryerse	Arkansas	Republican	Arkansas's 3rd congressional district	May 22, 2018	Lost	15.8%	Did not qualify	N/A
Roza Calderon	California (Note: California and Washington use a jungle primary system, where all candidates run on one primary ballot, regardless of party affiliation, and the top two finishers advance to the general election.)	Democratic	California's 4th congressional district	June 5, 2018	Lost	6.2%	Did not qualify	N/A
Ryan Khojasteh	California	Democratic	California's 12th congressional district	June 5, 2018	Lost	4.6%	Did not qualify	N/A
Chardo Richardson	Florida	Democratic	Florida's 7th congressional district	August 28, 2018	Lost	13.8%	Did not qualify	N/A
Michael Hepburn	Florida	Democratic	Florida's 27th congressional district	August 28, 2018	Lost	6.1%	Did not qualify	N/A
Anthony Clark	Illinois	Democratic	Illinois's 7th congressional district	March 20, 2018	Lost	26.1%	Did not qualify	N/A
David Gill	Illinois	Democratic	Illinois's 13th congressional district	March 20, 2018	Lost	14.4%	Did not qualify	N/A
Brent Welder	Kansas	Democratic	Kansas's 3rd congressional district	August 7, 2018	Lost	33.9%	Did not qualify	N/A
James Thompson	Kansas	Democratic	Kansas's 4th congressional district	August 7, 2018	Won	65.3%	Lost	40.2%
Zak Ringelstein	Maine	Democratic	U.S. Senator from Maine	June 12, 2018	Won (Note: Ran unopposed)	100%	Lost	10.3%
Rob Davidson	Michigan	Democratic	Michigan's 2nd congressional district	August 7, 2018	Won	100%	Lost	43.0%
David Benac	Michigan	Democratic	Michigan's 6th congressional district	August 7, 2018	Lost	21.3%	Did not qualify	N/A
Cori Bush	Missouri	Democratic	Missouri's 1st congressional district	August 7, 2018	Lost	36.9%	Did not qualify	N/A
John Heenan	Montana	Democratic	Montana's at-large congressional district	June 5, 2018	Lost	31.7%	Did not qualify	N/A
Amy Vilela	Nevada	Democratic	Nevada's 4th congressional district	June 12, 2018	Lost	9.2%	Did not qualify	N/A
Mindi Messmer	New Hampshire	Democratic	New Hampshire's 1st congressional district	September 11, 2018	Lost	9.7%	Did not qualify	N/A
Peter Jacob	New Jersey	Democratic	New Jersey's 7th congressional district	June 5, 2018	Lost	19.1%	Did not qualify	N/A
Alexandria Ocasio-Cortez	(New York (state)) New York	Democratic	New York's 14th congressional district	June 26, 2018	Won	57.5%	Won	78.0%
Richard Watkins	North Carolina	Democratic	North Carolina's 4th congressional district	May 8, 2018	Lost	6.5%	Did not qualify	N/A
Jenny Marshall	North Carolina	Democratic	North Carolina's 5th congressional district	May 8, 2018	Lost	45.6%	Did not qualify	N/A
Marc Whitmire	Tennessee	Independent	Tennessee's 2nd congressional district	N/A	N/A	N/A	Lost	0.2%
Danielle Mitchell	Tennessee	Democratic	Tennessee's 3rd congressional district	August 2, 2018	Won	100%	Lost	34.5%
J. Darnell Jones	Texas (Note: Texas uses a two-round primary system. If a candidate receives above 50% of the vote in the first round, they become the party's nominee; otherwise, the top two finishers advance to a second round.)	Democratic	Texas's 2nd congressional district	March 6, 2018; First round	Lost	22.1%	Did not qualify	N/A
Vanessa Adia	Texas	Democratic	Texas's 12th congressional district	March 6, 2018	Won	100%	Lost	33.9%
Adrienne Bell	Texas	Democratic	Texas's 14th congressional district	March 6, 2018	Won	79.8%	Lost	39.2%
Rick Treviño	Texas	Democratic	Texas's 23rd congressional district	March 6, 2018; First round	Advanced	17.5%	Runoff	N/A
Rick Treviño	Texas	Democratic	Texas's 23rd congressional district	May 22, 2018; Runoff	Lost	33.2%	Did not qualify	N/A
Linsey Fagan	Texas	Democratic	Texas's 26th congressional district	March 6, 2018	Won	52.7%	Lost	39.0%
Dorothy Gasque	(Washington (state)) Washington	Democratic	Washington's 3rd congressional district	August 7, 2018	Lost	4.9%	Did not qualify	N/A
Sarah Smith	(Washington (state)) Washington	Democratic	Washington's 9th congressional district	August 7, 2018	Advanced	26.9%	Lost	31.2%
Paula Jean Swearengin	West Virginia	Democratic	U.S. Senator from West Virginia	May 8, 2018	Lost	30.3%	Did not qualify	N/A

=== 2020 ===
Brand New Congress endorsed 46 candidates for the Senate and House. Nine House candidates and one Senate candidate made it to the general election (two incumbents, eight newcomers). Both incumbents and two newcomers won.

==== U.S. Senate ====
Candidate	State	Party	Office	Primary date	Primary result	%	General result	%
Jessica Scarane	Delaware	Democratic	U.S. Senator from Delaware	September 15, 2020	Lost	21.3%	Did not qualify	N/A
Kimberly Graham	Iowa	Democratic	U.S. Senator from Iowa	June 2, 2020	Lost	15%	Did not qualify	N/A
Charles Booker	Kentucky	Democratic	U.S. Senator from Kentucky	June 23, 2020	Lost	42.6%	Did not qualify	N/A
Betsy Sweet	Maine	Democratic	U.S. Senator from Maine	July 14, 2020	Lost	23.2%	Did not qualify	N/A
Maggie Toulouse Oliver	New Mexico	Democratic	U.S. Senator from New Mexico	June 2, 2020	Withdrew	N/A	Did not qualify	N/A
Paula Jean Swearengin	West Virginia	Democratic	U.S. Senator from West Virginia	June 9, 2020	Won	38.8%	Lost	27%

==== U.S. House ====
Candidate	State	Party	Office	Primary date	Primary result	%	General result	%
Eva Putzova	Arizona	Democratic	Arizona's 1st congressional district	August 4, 2020	Lost	41.2%	Did not qualify	N/A
Kimberly Williams	California	Democratic	California's 16th congressional district	March 3, 2020	Lost	5.7%	Did not qualify	N/A
Peter Mathews	California	Democratic	California's 47th congressional district	March 3, 2020	Lost	11%	Did not qualify	N/A
Jen Perelman	Florida	Democratic	Florida's 23rd congressional district	August 18, 2020	Lost	28%	Did not qualify	N/A
Michael Hepburn	Florida	Democratic	Florida's 27th congressional district	August 25, 2020	Withdrew	N/A	Did not qualify	N/A
Nabilah Islam	(Georgia (U.S. state)) Georgia	Democratic	Georgia's 7th congressional district	June 9, 2020	Lost	12.3%	Did not qualify	N/A
Michael Owens	(Georgia (U.S. state)) Georgia	Democratic	Georgia's 13th congressional district	June 9, 2020	Lost	13.2%	Did not qualify	N/A
Robert Emmons Jr.	Illinois	Democratic	Illinois's 1st congressional district	March 17, 2020	Lost	10.3%	Did not qualify	N/A
Anthony Clark	Illinois	Democratic	Illinois's 7th congressional district	March 17, 2020	Lost	13.0%	Did not qualify	N/A
Rachel Ventura	Illinois	Democratic	Illinois's 11th congressional district	March 17, 2020	Lost	41.3%	Did not qualify	N/A
Jim Harper	Indiana	Democratic	Indiana's 1st congressional district	June 2, 2020	Lost	10.1%	Did not qualify	N/A
Shelia Bryant	Maryland	Democratic	Maryland's 4th congressional district	June 2, 2020	Lost	18.8%	Did not qualify	N/A
Mckayla Wilkes	Maryland	Democratic	Maryland's 5th congressional district	June 2, 2020	Lost	26.7%	Did not qualify	N/A
Alex Morse	Massachusetts	Democratic	Massachusetts's 1st congressional district	September 1, 2020	Lost	41.2%	Did not qualify	N/A
Ihssane Leckey	Massachusetts	Democratic	Massachusetts's 4th congressional district	September 1, 2020	Lost	11.1%	Did not qualify	N/A
Jon Hoadley	Michigan	Democratic	Michigan's 6th congressional district	August 4, 2020	Won	52.3%	Lost	40.2%
Rashida Tlaib (inc.)	Michigan	Democratic	Michigan's 13th congressional district	August 4, 2020	Won	66.3%	Won	78.1%
Cori Bush	Missouri	Democratic	Missouri's 1st congressional district	August 4, 2020	Won	48.6%	Won	78.8%
Kara Eastman	Nebraska	Democratic	Nebraska's 2nd congressional district	May 12, 2020	Won	62.1%	Lost	46.2%
Zina Spezakis	New Jersey	Democratic	New Jersey's 9th congressional district	July 7, 2020	Lost	14.9%	Did not qualify	N/A
Melanie D’Arrigo	(New York (state)) New York	Democratic	New York's 3rd congressional district	June 23, 2020	Lost	25.5%	Did not qualify	N/A
Shaniyat Chowdhury	(New York (state)) New York	Democratic	New York's 5th congressional district	June 23, 2020	Lost	23.1%	Did not qualify	N/A
Mel Gagarin	(New York (state)) New York	Democratic	New York's 6th congressional district	June 23, 2020	Lost	21.2%	Did not qualify	N/A
Isiah James	(New York (state)) New York	Democratic	New York's 9th congressional district	June 23, 2020	Lost	9.4%	Did not qualify	N/A
Lindsey Boylan	(New York (state)) New York	Democratic	New York's 10th congressional district	June 23, 2020	Lost	25%	Did not qualify	N/A
Lauren Ashcraft	(New York (state)) New York	Democratic	New York's 12th congressional district	June 23, 2020	Lost	13.3%	Did not qualify	N/A
Alexandria Ocasio-Cortez (inc.)	(New York (state)) New York	Democratic	New York's 14th congressional district	June 23, 2020	Won	72.6%	Won	71.6%
Tomás Ramos	(New York (state)) New York	Democratic	New York's 15th congressional district	June 23, 2020	Lost	2.6%	Did not qualify	N/A
Jamaal Bowman	(New York (state)) New York	Democratic	New York's 16th congressional district	June 23, 2020	Won	55.5%	Won	84.0%
Morgan Harper	Ohio	Democratic	Ohio's 3rd congressional district	April 28, 2020	Lost	31.7%	Did not qualify	N/A
Nick Rubando	Ohio	Democratic	Ohio's 5th congressional district	April 28, 2020	Won	51.4%	Lost	32.0%
Albert Lee	Oregon	Democratic	Oregon's 3rd congressional district	May 19, 2020	Lost	16.8%	Did not qualify	N/A
Doyle Canning	Oregon	Democratic	Oregon's 4th congressional district	May 19, 2020	Lost	15.4%	Did not qualify	N/A
Mark Gamba	Oregon	Democratic	Oregon's 5th congressional district	May 19, 2020	Lost	22.9%	Did not qualify	N/A
Corey Strong	Tennessee	Democratic	Tennessee's 9th congressional district	August 6, 2020	Lost	14.8%	Did not qualify	N/A
Michael Siegel	Texas	Democratic	Texas's 10th congressional district	March 3, 2020; First round	Advanced	44%	Runoff	N/A
Michael Siegel	Texas	Democratic	Texas's 10th congressional district	July 7, 2020; Runoff	Won	54.2%	Lost	45.3%
Adrienne Bell	Texas	Democratic	Texas's 14th congressional district	March 3, 2020	Won	61.8%	Lost	38.4%
Peter Khalil	(Washington (state)) Washington	Democratic	Washington's 3rd congressional district	August 4, 2020	Withdrew	N/A	Did not qualify	N/A
Chris Armitage	(Washington (state)) Washington	Democratic	Washington's 5th congressional district	August 4, 2020	Withdrew	12.1% (Note: While Armitage withdrew prior to Washington's primary election date, he still remained on the ballot, and, thus, still received votes.)	Did not qualify	N/A
Rebecca Parson	(Washington (state)) Washington	Democratic	Washington's 6th congressional district	August 4, 2020	Lost	13.5%	Did not qualify	N/A

=== 2021 ===
==== U.S. House ====
Candidate	State	Office	Primary date	Primary result	%	General result	%
Selinda Guerrero	New Mexico (Note: Special election candidates from each party in New Mexico are decided by party committee conventions, not regular primary elections)	New Mexico's 1st congressional district	March 31, 2021 (Note: Special election to replace Deb Haaland, who resigned on March 16, 2021)	Eliminated	6.53%	Did not qualify	N/A
Nina Turner	Ohio	Ohio's 11th congressional district	August 3, 2021 (Note: Special election to replace Marcia Fudge, who resigned on March 10, 2021)	Lost	44.5%	Did not qualify	N/A
Sheila Cherfilus-McCormick	Florida	Florida's 20th congressional district	November 2, 2021 (Note: Special election to replace Alcee Hastings, who died on April 6, 2021)	Won	23.76%	Won	78.98%

=== 2022 ===
==== U.S. Senate ====
Candidate	State	Office	Primary date	Primary result	%	General result	%
Charles Booker	Kentucky	U.S. Senator from Kentucky	May 17, 2022	Won	73.2%	Lost	38.2%
Morgan Harper	Ohio	U.S. Senator from Ohio	May 3, 2022	Lost	17.7%	Did not qualify	N/A
John Fetterman (Note: Received endorsement after Kenyatta lost the primary.)	Pennsylvania	U.S. Senator from Pennsylvania	May 17, 2022	Won	58.6%	Won	51.2%
~~Malcolm Kenyatta~~ (Note: Switched endorsement to Fetterman after Kenyatta lost the primary.)	Pennsylvania	U.S. Senator from Pennsylvania	May 17, 2022	Lost	10.9%	Did not qualify	N/A

==== U.S. House ====
Candidate	State	Office	Primary date	Primary result	%	General result	%
Angelica Dueñas	California	California's 29th congressional district	June 7, 2022	Advanced	22.8%	Lost	41.5%
Shervin Aazami	California	California's 32nd congressional district	June 7, 2022	Lost	6.8%	Did not qualify	N/A
Katie Porter (inc.)	California	California's 47th congressional district (Note: Porter ran in the new 47th district after previously representing the 45th district prior to redistricting.)	June 7, 2022	Advanced	51.7%	Won	51.7%
Maxwell Frost	Florida	Florida's 10th congressional district	August 23, 2022	Won	34.8%	Won	59.0%
Sheila Cherfilus-McCormick (inc.)	Florida	Florida's 20th congressional district	August 23, 2022	Won	65.6%	Won	72.3%
Marsha Williams	Illinois	Illinois's 17th congressional district	June 28, 2022	Lost	6.9%	Did not qualify	N/A
Andy Levin (inc.)	Michigan	Michigan's 11th congressional district (Note: Levin ran in the new 11th district after previously representing the 9th district prior to redistricting.)	August 2, 2022	Lost	40.1%	Did not qualify	N/A
Rashida Tlaib (inc.)	Michigan	Michigan's 12th congressional district (Note: Talib ran in the new 12th district after moving from the 13th district due to redistricting.)	August 2, 2022	Won	63.8%	Won	70.8%
Cori Bush (inc.)	Missouri	Missouri's 1st congressional district	August 2, 2022	Won	69.5%	Won	72.9%
Tom Winter	Montana	Montana's 1st congressional district	June 7, 2022	Lost	8.2%	Did not qualify	N/A
Amy Vilela	Nevada	Nevada's 1st congressional district	June 14, 2022	Lost	18.5%	Did not qualify	N/A
Imani Oakley	New Jersey	New Jersey's 10th congressional district	June 7, 2022	Lost	10.2%	Did not qualify	N/A
Melanie D'Arrigo	(New York (state)) New York	New York's 3rd congressional district	August 23, 2022	Lost	15.8%	Did not qualify	N/A
Brittany Ramos DeBarros	(New York (state)) New York	New York's 11th congressional district	August 23, 2022	Lost	20.8%	Did not qualify	N/A
Rana Abdelhamid	(New York (state)) New York	New York's 12th congressional district	August 23, 2022	Withdrew	N/A	Did not qualify	N/A
Alexandria Ocasio-Cortez (inc.)	(New York (state)) New York	New York's 14th congressional district	August 23, 2022	Won	100%	Won	67.2%
Jamaal Bowman (inc.)	(New York (state)) New York	New York's 16th congressional district	August 23, 2022	Won	57.1%	Won	60.2%
Erica Smith	North Carolina	North Carolina's 1st congressional district	May 17, 2022	Lost	31.1%	Did not qualify	N/A
Nida Allam	North Carolina	North Carolina's 4th congressional district	May 17, 2022	Lost	37.0%	Did not qualify	N/A
Nina Turner	Ohio	Ohio's 11th congressional district	May 3, 2022	Lost	33.7%	Did not qualify	N/A
Doyle Canning	Oregon	Oregon's 4th congressional district	May 17, 2022	Lost	16.2%	Did not qualify	N/A
Jerry Dickinson	Pennsylvania	Pennsylvania's 12th congressional district (Note: Dickinson ran in the new 12th district, which was renumbered from the 18th district in redistricting.)	May 17, 2022	Lost	10.9%	Did not qualify	N/A
Odessa Kelly	Tennessee	Tennessee's 7th congressional district (Note: Kelly ran in the new 7th district after moving from the 5th district due to redistricting.)	August 4, 2022	Won	100%	Lost	38.1%
Michelle Vallejo	Texas	Texas's 15th congressional district	March 1, 2022; First round	Advanced	20.1%	Runoff	N/A
Michelle Vallejo	Texas	Texas's 15th congressional district	May 24, 2022; Runoff	Won	50.1%	Lost	44.8%
Jessica Cisneros	Texas	Texas's 28th congressional district	March 1, 2022; First round	Advanced	46.8%	Runoff	N/A
Jessica Cisneros	Texas	Texas's 28th congressional district	May 24, 2022; Runoff	Lost	49.7%	Did not qualify	N/A
Jessica Mason	Texas	Texas's 30th congressional district	March 1, 2022	Lost	3.4%	Did not qualify	N/A
Greg Casar	Texas	Texas's 35th congressional district	March 1, 2022	Won	61.2%	Won	72.6%
Becca Balint (Note: Received endorsement after Ram withdrew.)	Vermont	Vermont's at-large congressional district	August 9, 2022	Won	61.0%	Won	60.5%
~~Kesha Ram Hinsdale~~ (Note: Switched endorsement to Balint after Ram withdrew.)	Vermont	Vermont's at-large congressional district	August 9, 2022	Withdrew	N/A	Did not qualify	N/A
Rebecca Parson	(Washington (state)) Washington	Washington's 6th congressional district	August 2, 2022	Lost	9.3%	Did not qualify	N/A
Stephanie Gallardo	(Washington (state)) Washington	Washington's 9th congressional district	August 2, 2022	Lost	15.6%	Did not qualify	N/A

== Platform ==
Their platform contained many progressive priorities, with the following overarching goals:

- Rebuild the economy through infrastructure and community investment.
- Fix the healthcare system with Medicare for All and increased access to medical services.
- End mass incarceration by ending the war on drugs and demilitarizing police.
- Fight for families through fixing schools and family leave.
- Clean up Washington D.C. by cutting taxes for middle and low income people and removing money from politics.
- Reform our immigration system with employment verification systems and global legal immigration centers.
- Stop fighting reckless wars and instead support economic development as with the Marshall Plan.
- Address climate change through building a green economy and a 100% renewable energy system.

== Summer for Progress ==
Several progressive organizations, including Our Revolution, Justice Democrats, Democratic Socialists of America, National Nurses United, Working Families Party, and Fight for 15, announced in July 2017 a push to encourage House Democrats to sign on to a #PeoplesPlatform, which consists of supporting "eight bills currently in the House of Representatives that will address the concerns of everyday Americans." These eight bills and the topics they address are:

1. Medicare for All: H.R. 676 Medicare For All Act
2. Free College Tuition: H.R. 1880 College for All Act of 2017
3. Worker Rights: H.R.15 - Raise the Wage Act
4. Women's Rights: H.R.771 - Equal Access to Abortion Coverage in Health Insurance (EACH Woman) Act of 2017
5. Voting Rights: H.R. 2840 - Automatic Voter Registration Act
6. Environmental Justice: Climate Change Bill - TBD
7. Criminal Justice and Immigrant Rights: H.R. 3227 - Justice is Not For Sale Act of 2017
8. Taxing Wall Street: H.R. 1144 - Inclusive Prosperity Act

== See also ==
- Our Revolution – the official political action organization spun out of the 2016 Bernie Sanders presidential campaign
- Justice Democrats – a PAC dedicated to replacing corporate-backed Democratic Congressional representatives
- Brand New Bundestag - similarly named progressive political organisation in Germany
