= Brand New Bundestag =

- Founded: 2019
- Founders: Eva-Maria Thurnhofer; Maximilian Oehl; Daniel Veldhoen
- Headquarters: Berlin
- Revenue: 69,385 euros (2023)
- Staff: 5 (2021)
- Volunteers: 200 (2021)
- Website: https://brandnewbundestag.de/

Brand New Bundestag (BNB) is a German non-partisan political initiative founded in 2019 that supports young politicians with the aim of enabling them to enter parliaments at the federal and state levels. The initiative's stated goal is to promote "progressive politics" and make parliaments more diverse. The initiative defines progressive politics as, among other things, a commitment to compliance with the 1.5-degree climate target, social justice, and a united Europe. The initiative made its first public appearance and supported candidates in the 2021 German federal election and the 2021 Berlin state election.

== History ==
The movement was initiated by Eva-Maria Thurnhofer, Maximilian Oehl, and Daniel Veldhoen in 2019 and, according to the initiators, was inspired by the American organization Brand New Congress. The same people also represent the cooperative "Wir für Zukunft eG," registered with the Charlottenburg District Court, which supports the Brand New Bundestag initiative. The projects are implemented almost exclusively by volunteers and are financed primarily through donations, foundation funds, and grants.

The initiative supported eleven candidates in the 2021 federal election, three of whom were elected to the Bundestag (Rasha Nasr, Kassem Taher Saleh, Armand Zorn). Initially, any citizen could nominate candidates on the initiative's website. Following a selection process, 120 candidates were nominated in several steps, who were then presented to a self-assembled jury.

The jury consisted of Raúl Krauthausen, Kübra Gümüşay, Melanie Stein (journalist and founder of the initiative We are the East), Roman Huber (executive federal board member of Mehr Demokratie e. V.), Shai Hoffmann, and Anna Dushime (editor-in-chief at the Berlin production company Steinberger Silberstein).

In the 2024 European Parliament election, Brand New Bundestag supported the international campaign EU Future 100, through which 44 of 100 candidates entered the European Parliament. In 2025, 23 of the 56 BNB candidates became members of the 21st Bundestag.

A wide range of support is available for candidates, including coaching, workshops and interview training to improve public relations, as well as financial support from joint crowdfunding.

== Goals ==
Brand New Bundestag sees itself as a grassroots movement, whose stated goal is to promote diversity and bring the political goals of current movements into legislatures.

=== List of demands ===
The list of demands of the initiative concerns the four topics of climate crisis, social justice, sustainable economics and a Europe of solidarity:

Climate crisis
Compliance with the Paris Climate Agreement, a fair distribution of climate protection costs, a transport turnaround and the development of regenerative agriculture are called for.

Social justice
Among other things, they call for equal opportunities in education, a progressive healthcare system, and a reform of the social welfare system. They also call for better prospects for refugees, the implementation of a fair tax system, and the overcoming of social divisions.

Sustainable business
BNB calls, among other things, for a more ecological economy through state regulation, a renewed crisis-proof financial system, shorter and more flexible working hours, the expansion of infrastructure and stronger support for education and new business models.

Europe of solidarity
BNB understands this to mean a more effective European Union with more prospects for its members, a more unified economy and politics, and a more social migration and border policy.

=== Political classification ===
BNB considers itself non-partisan. However, the board admits that, due to their political goals, they have significant overlap with the Social Democratic Party of Germany (SPD) and the Alliance 90/The Greens. Nevertheless, the candidates supported by BNB now include not only politicians from the SPD, Alliance 90/The Greens, the Left Party, and independent candidates, but also from the CDU and Free Democratic Party (FDP). Brand New Bundestag consciously distances itself from the AfD.

Before the federal election, BNB published a list of 50 Bundestag candidates who embody the Progressive Initiative. This list showed the same tendency of increasing overlap with Alliance 90/The Greens and SPD candidates, but also included recommendations for candidates running for the FDP, the Left Party, the CDU, or as independents.

== Reception ==
In the run-up to the 2021 German federal election, BNB received increased media attention. On public television, ARD and ZDF dedicated a 45-minute report to the initiative, which was shown on the joint channel Phoenix. The report shows the path of some of the candidates supported by BNB in the election campaign and the type of support provided by the initiative. In the print media (Welt, Der Spiegel, Zeit, Frankfurter Rundschau, FAZ, RND) and on the radio (Deutschlandfunk Kultur), the supported candidates and the presentation of the initiative's goals of making the Bundestag more diverse and "progressive" were in the foreground.

Benjamin Höhne, director of the Berlin Instituts für Parlamentarismusforschung, described the support of non-party candidates in an article for Die Welt 2020 as "quite hopeless". This would require winning a constituency, whereby all candidates of the established parties would have to be outdone. The model was copied from the USA (Brand New Congress), where there is no chance for other political parties besides Republicans and Democrats, and attempts are made to influence the majorities within the parties. Primaries in the USA are a proven means for this, which is lacking in Germany. Höhne suspects that it would therefore still be more effective in Germany to found new parties. In 2021, the Berlin political scientist Wolfgang Merkel drew attention to the problem of considerable lack of transparency when private associations with significant financial resources and their own agenda intervene in the parties from outside, even though the work of Brand New Bundestag is mainly limited to coaching, interview training and campaign support.

== See also ==
- Brand New Congress
