= Paula Jean Swearengin =

American activist and politician (born 1974)

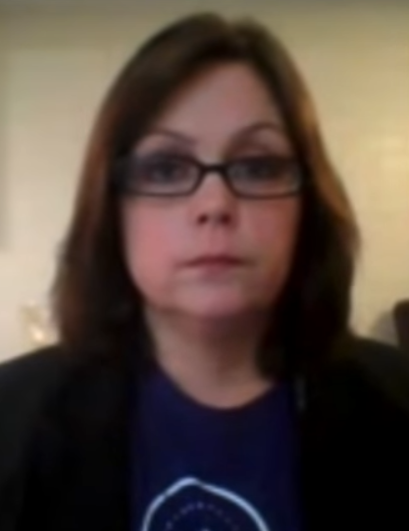

Personal details
- Born: June 13, 1974 (age 52) Mullens, West Virginia, U.S.
- Party: Democratic (before 2021); People's Party (2021–2022); Independent (2022–present)
- Children: 4

Paula Jean Swearengin (born June 13, 1974) is an American activist and politician who was the Democratic nominee in the 2020 U.S. Senate election in West Virginia, and a candidate in the Democratic primary for the state's other Senate seat in 2018. Her 2018 campaign was one of four campaigns featured in the 2019 documentary Knock Down the House.

Swearengin lost the 2020 election to Republican incumbent Shelley Moore Capito by more than 40 percentage points, and the 2018 primary to incumbent Joe Manchin. She left the Democratic Party in 2021 and joined the Movement for a People's Party. She left the organization in 2022.

== Early life ==
Swearengin was born in Mullens, West Virginia to a family of coal miners historically affiliated with the United Mine Workers of America (UMWA). One of her grandfathers served in the Korean War, and her father in the Vietnam War. She lost her grandfather and several uncles to black lung disease contracted in the coal mines. Her father died of cancer at age 52.

== Career ==
Swearengin was professionally employed as an office manager. She has advocated for economic diversity, clean air and clean water in her community, and all of West Virginia, since 2001. She is a former board member and representative of the Keepers of the Mountain Foundation, a West Virginia organization that opposed mountaintop removal mining. She has also spoken on behalf of the Ohio Valley Environmental Coalition and the Sierra Club at public fora and events, including EPA hearings on the Clean Power Plan. She supported Bernie Sanders's 2016 presidential campaign. On February 20, 2022, Swearengin left the People's Party.

=== 2018 election ===
In May 2017, Swearengin announced her candidacy against Joe Manchin in the U.S. Senate election in West Virginia. She was one of the first candidates supported by Brand New Congress. Swearengin refused all PAC donations in the election and received no contributions over $200.

Swearengin's campaign was highlighted in the 2019 documentary Knock Down the House alongside the primary campaigns of Alexandria Ocasio-Cortez, Amy Vilela, and Cori Bush, three other Democrats who ran for Congress in the 2018 midterm elections, with Ocasio-Cortez winning her election. The film premiered at the 2019 Sundance Film Festival. and was released on Netflix on May 1, 2019.

=== 2020 election ===
In June 2019, Swearengin announced her campaign for Senate against Republican incumbent Shelley Moore Capito. She had two opponents in the June 9 Democratic primary, Richie Robb and Richard Ojeda. Swearengin won with 38% of the vote to Ojeda's 33% and Robb's 29%. In the November 3 general election she faced Capito, who has been a Senator since 2015, and unaffiliated candidate Franklin Riley, losing to the former.

Swearengin joined her three other Knock Down the House co-stars in endorsing Vermont Senator Bernie Sanders for the Democratic nomination for president in 2020. Sanders endorsed Swearengin's campaign for Senate on July 8, 2020.

In the November general election, Capito defeated Swearengin by more than 40%, winning every county in the state. Swearengin left the Democratic Party less than one year later, writing in July 2021 of the West Virginia Democratic Party and the DNC that "I can't support racism or them ignoring Appalachian children dying & suffering."

== Political positions ==
Swearengin supports a Medicare for All healthcare plan. She favors legalization of both medical and recreational cannabis. She also supports raising the minimum wage to $15 and free public college tuition. She has spoken out against the influence of pharmaceutical companies in addressing the opioid epidemic and argues that long-term treatment centers and a harm reduction model both have roles to play in addressing the epidemic.

== Electoral history ==
United States Senate election in West Virginia Democratic primary, 2018
Party	Candidate	Votes	%
Democratic	Joe Manchin (incumbent)	111,589	69.8%
Democratic	Paula Jean Swearengin	48,302	30.2%
Total votes		159,891	100.0%

United States Senate election in West Virginia Democratic primary, 2020
Party	Candidate	Votes	%
Democratic	Paula Jean Swearengin	72,292	38.39%
Democratic	Richard N. Ojeda II	61,954	32.90%
Democratic	Richie Robb	54,048	28.70%
Total votes		188,294	100.00%

United States Senate election in West Virginia, 2020
Party	Candidate	Votes	%
Republican	Shelley Moore Capito (incumbent)	547,454	70.28%
Democratic	Paula Jean Swearengin	210,309	27.00%
Libertarian	David Moran	21,155	2.72%
Total votes		778,918	100.00%

== Personal life ==
Swearengin is a single mother. She has four sons and one grandson. She lives in Coal City, West Virginia.

Party political offices
Preceded by Natalie Tennant	Democratic nominee for U.S. Senator from West Virginia (Class 2); 2020	Succeeded by Rachel Fetty Anderson
