= Kübra Gümüşay =

German-Turkish writer and activist (born 1988)

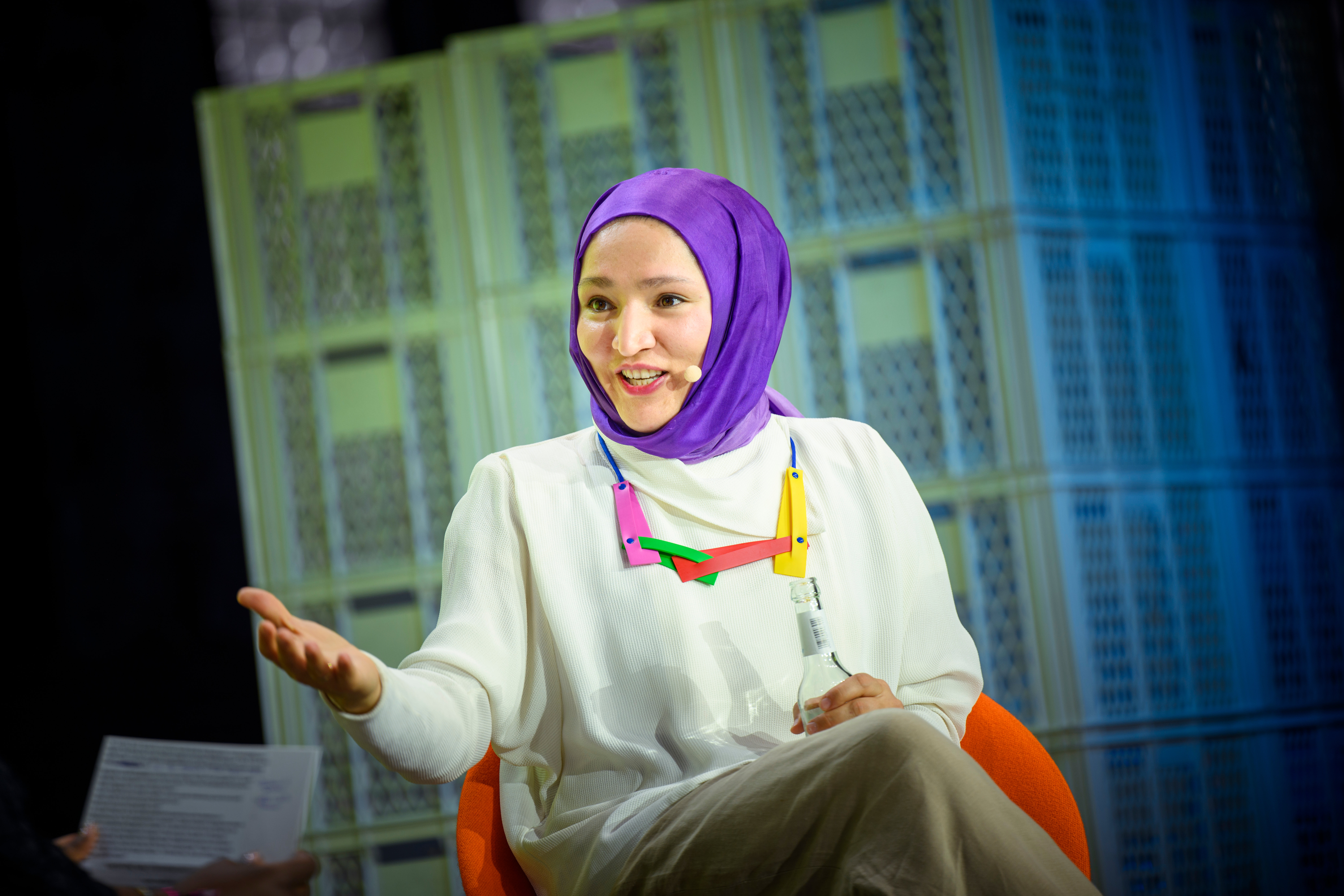
Kübra Gümüşay in 2023

Kübra Gümüşay née Yücel (born 28 June 1988, Hamburg) is a German–Turkish journalist, activist, public speaker and author of SPIEGEL best-selling book Sprache Und Sein, translated into English as Speaking and Being. She came into the public eye through her blog, A Foreign Dictionary, where she wrote from 2008-2019.

== Early life and education ==
Kübra Gümüşay is the granddaughter of a Turkish guest worker in Germany. Her parents left Turkey because her mother was no longer allowed to work as a lecturer at Istanbul University in Turkey due to her headscarf. Kübra Gümüşay studied political science in Hamburg and at the School of Oriental and African Studies at the University of London. Since 2012, she has lived with her husband Ali Aslan Gümüşay in Oxford in the United Kingdom. She is a practising headscarf-wearing Muslim and describes herself as a German Turk and feminist.

== Career ==
Gümüşay started a blog in 2008 entitled A Foreign Dictionary, in which she wrote about the internet, politics, society, feminism and Islam until the end of 2019 and which was accessed up to 13,000 times a month. With her blog, she wanted to "break down stereotypes" and "give a voice to those who are otherwise not in the media." Her blog was nominated for a Grimme Online Award in 2011.

The specialist journal Medium Magazin then voted Gümüşay one of the "Top 30 to 30" most promising young journalistic talents in Germany. Ina Wunn listed Gümüşay under the headline New Paths for Muslim Women in Europe in Das Parlament among the Muslim feminist activists who "actively intervene in politics to address the discrimination of (not only) Muslim women." In 2012, Deutschlandradio reported on Gümüşay in a series entitled "Formative Minds of Islam".

Upon the invitation of Daniel Schulz, head of department at Die Tageszeitung, Gümüşay told her stories from the world of a German Muslim woman wearing a headscarf in the regular Taz column Das Tuch from 2010 to June 2013, through which she became one of the first hijab-wearing columnists in Germany. She compared this to the development in the women's movement. "First, a few would have to be specifically invited to participate in order to be visible and pave the way for others." Matthias Matussek wrote in his debate article on integration for Spiegel Online that Gümüşay does not wear the headscarf out of submissiveness, but out of pride. She wanted to show her religion. It was her form of punk, her form of rebellion.

Gümüşay was editor-in-chief of the Hamburg youth magazine Freihafen in 2008. As a freelance journalist, she has published on the topics of immigration and integration, including in Die Zeit, Migazin and Mädchenmannschaft. She contributed to the debate on Thilo Sarrazin's book Deutschland schafft sich ab with a contribution to the anthology Manifest der Vielen - Deutschland erfindet sich neu edited by Hilal Sezgin. In 2011, she interviewed Thilo Sarrazin as a guest on a radio program on the BBC.

In 2010, Gümüşay co-founded the EU-funded network Zahnräder, which aimed to provide a platform for Muslims from business, politics, media, academia and the social sector to get to know and support each other. In 2018, she was named in Forbes magazine's Top 30 under 30 in Europe for Media and Marketing. From June–August 2021, she was a recipient of the Tarabya Artist in Residency Fellowship of the German Kulturakademie.

She has been part of various initiatives aimed at increasing diversity and inclusion, and creating new spaces, including as a co-founder of eeden, a feminist co-creation space in Hamburg, a co-founder of future_s, a feminist research and advocacy organisation; as an expert advisor to Imagine Hamburg, a festival imagining what Hamburg in the future could be like; and as a jury member of Brand New Bundestag.

In 2020, her book Sprache & Sein was published by Hanser Berlin and named as one of the best non-fiction books in 2020 by Die Welt; as a 'must-read' book from German magazine tipBerlin for 2020; and as one of the best non-fiction books for April 2020 by Deutschlandfunk Kultur, as chosen by a jury of 30 critics. In her book, Gümüşay questioned how bilingual children's education might have been different if they were allowed to read more from what she calls "non-prestige" languages, listing Emine Sevgi Özdamar, Nazik al-Mala’ika, Maya Angelou, Necip Fazıl Kısakürek, Hafes, Audre Lorde, Ellen Kuzwayo and Noémi de Sousa, among others, in terms of having bilingual skills seen as an advantage, rather than a disadvantage.

From January to September 2022, Gümüşay was appointed a Visiting Fellow and Mercator Senior Fellow at CRASSH and the Leverhulme Center for the Future of Intelligence at the University of Cambridge, where she explored how imaginations of the future impact realities. In 2023, Gümüşay was awarded a fellowship at the New Institute based in Hamburg, where her research focused on "just futures, real utopias and the politics of imagination."

Gümüşay's latest book, 'Zukünfte' (Futures), will be released on 31.12.2026 by Ullstein Verlag.

== Activism ==
Gümüşay is the co-founder and co-initiator of a number of prominent feminist campaigns, including the anti-racism campaign #SchauHin, a Twitter campaign which encouraged people to share their experiences of racism in Germany and the feminist alliance #ausnahmslos against sexual violence and racism, with another 22 co-founders including journalist Anne Wizorek, which called attention to the ways in which feminism was "being instrumentalised for racist and populist discourse."

Gümüşay's activism has held intersectional feminist values at the heart: considering people who are marginalised through multiple identities, and seeking to create an "alliance among multiple feminisms." Academic Beverly M. Weber identifies the risks that Gümüşay takes in doing so given the "conditions under which she is visible and comprehensible to her publics" as a hijabi Muslim woman.

Some of these risks can be seen in how Gümüsay strongest criticism has come from intellectuals, authors, and activists in or connected to the Turkish (or broader Muslim-background) community. A 2021 profile of Gümüşay published in German media outlet Die Zeit entitled Symbolfrau ('Symbol Woman') analysed the ways in which she has been attacked in the media based on public perceptions or assumptions of her position, often due to her personal choice to wear the hijab. Other examples of this type of criticism include German-Turkish rapper Dr. Reyhan Sahin a.k.a. Lady Bitch Ray who criticised Gümüsay in 2016 for, in her eyes, not addressing racist structures within Islam, nor the then-Turkish government's actions against women's rights, members of the LGBT community and their supporters.

Similarly, other critics have also labelled her "a spokesperson for Islamic Feminism" and seek to hold her accountable for what they see as failures within the movement. Notably, this is not a title she herself has ever claimed; in fact, in her book Speaking and Being she pointed out that she wants to have the right to speak for herself only. German journalist Daniel Schulz noted that with hindsight, he often underestimated the amount of pressure Gümüşay was under to "say the right things" in her Taz column due to this type of criticism.

Further criticism also come from feminist circles associated with Alice Schwarzer. The feminist magazine EMMA criticised Gümüsay in January 2018, in response to which Gümüsay filed a defamation suit. While EMMA had to amend three sections of the text and subsequently published a revised version of the article, Schwarzer maintained that it did not detract anything from the main arguments of the essay.
