= 2020 United States Senate election in West Virginia =

- November 3, 2020
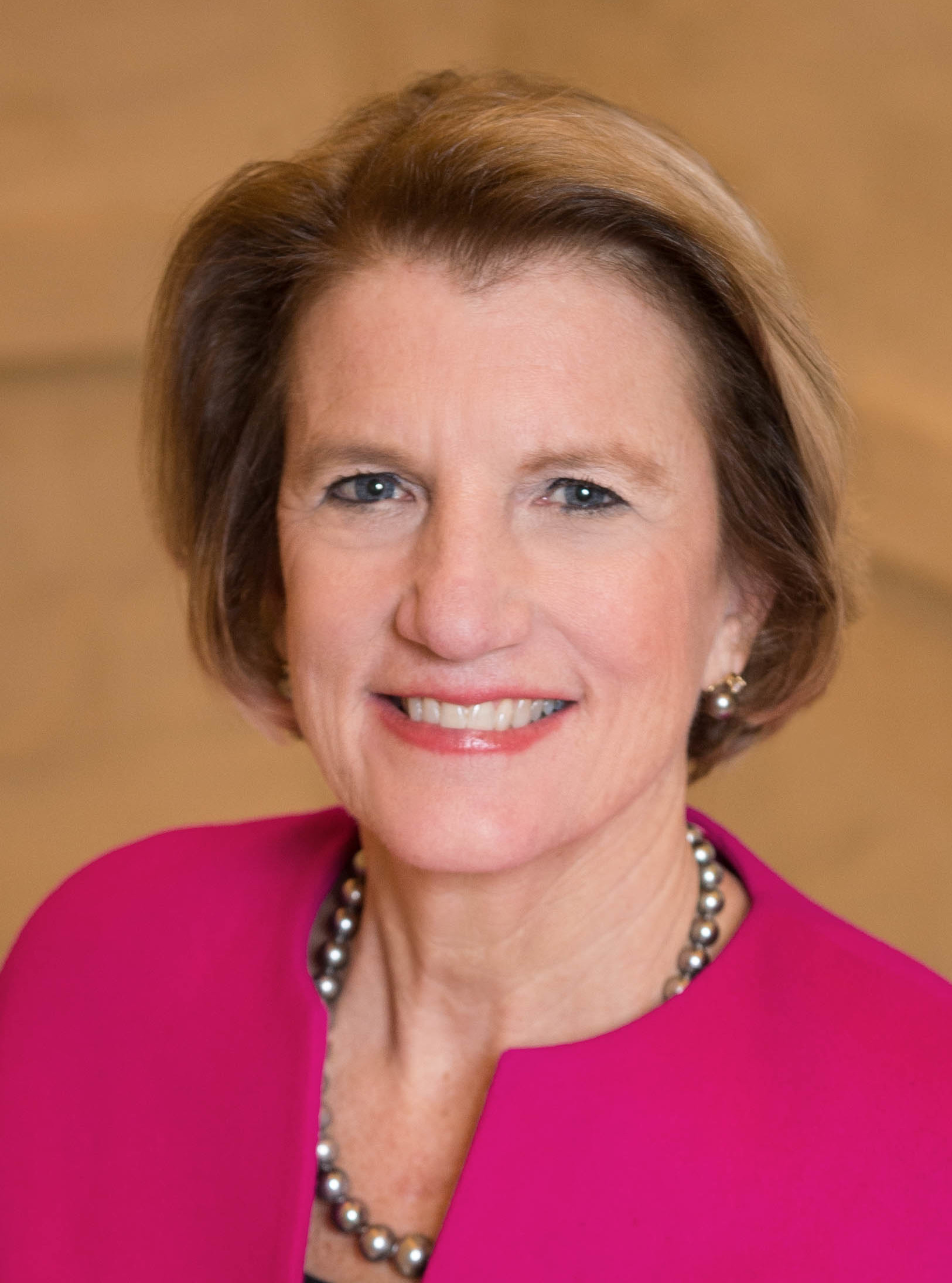

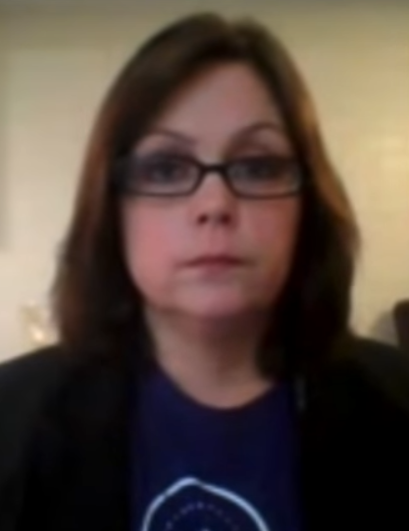
Nominee	Shelley Moore Capito	Paula Jean Swearengin
Party	Republican	Democratic
Popular vote	547,454	210,309
Percentage	70.28%	27.00%
- Capito: 40–50% 50–60% 60–70% 70–80% 80–90% >90% Swearengin: 40–50% 50–60% 60–70% 70–80% 80–90% Tie: 40–50% 50%
U.S. senator before election
Shelley Moore Capito
Republican
Elected U.S. Senator
Shelley Moore Capito
Republican

The 2020 United States Senate election in West Virginia was held on November 3, 2020, to elect a member of the United States Senate to represent the State of West Virginia, concurrently with the 2020 U.S. presidential election, as well as other elections to the United States Senate in other states, elections to the United States House of Representatives, and various state and local elections.

Incumbent senator Shelley Moore Capito won a second term against Democrat Paula Jean Swearengin by a margin of 43.3%, winning every county, and becoming the first West Virginia Republican to win reelection to the U.S. Senate since 1907.

Swearengin's 27% of the vote was the lowest vote percentage and worst margin of defeat for any Democratic Senate candidate in West Virginia history.

== Republican primary ==
=== Candidates ===
==== Nominee ====
- Shelley Moore Capito, incumbent U.S. Senator

==== Eliminated in primary ====
- Larry Butcher, farmer
- Allen Whitt, president of the West Virginia Family Policy Council

=== Endorsements ===
Shelley Moore Capito

Organizations

- Maggie's List

=== Results ===
Results by county: Moore Capito: Capito—80–90%; Capito—70–80%

Republican primary results
Party	Candidate	Votes	%
Republican	Shelley Moore Capito (incumbent)	173,847	83.32%
Republican	Allen Whitt	20,075	9.62%
Republican	Larry Butcher	14,717	7.05%
Total votes		208,639	100.00%

== Democratic primary ==
Paula Jean Swearengin won the nomination with 38.8% of the vote in the state's Democratic primary on June 9, 2020.

=== Candidates ===
==== Nominee ====
- Paula Jean Swearengin, environmental activist and candidate for the U.S. Senate in 2018

==== Eliminated in primary ====
- Richard Ojeda, former state senator, nominee for West Virginia's 3rd congressional district in 2018, and former candidate for president of the United States in 2020
- Richie Robb, former mayor of South Charleston

==== Declined ====
- Mike Pushkin, state delegate
- Earl Ray Tomblin, former governor of West Virginia

=== Endorsements ===
Paula Jean Swearengin

Organizations

- Brand New Congress
- Sierra Club
- Students for Gun Legislation

=== Results ===
Results by county Swearengin: 30–40%; 40–50%; 50–60%; Ojeda: 20–30%; 30–40%; 40–50%; Robb: 30–40%; 40–50%; 50–60%

Democratic primary results
Party	Candidate	Votes	%
Democratic	Paula Jean Swearengin	72,292	38.39%
Democratic	Richard Ojeda	61,954	32.90%
Democratic	Richie Robb	54,048	28.70%
Total votes		188,294	100.00%

== Other candidates ==
=== Libertarian Party ===
==== Nominee ====
- David Moran

=== Independents ===
==== Withdrawn ====
- Franklin Riley

== General election ==
=== Predictions ===
Source	Ranking	As of
The Cook Political Report	Safe R	October 29, 2020
Inside Elections	Safe R	October 28, 2020
Sabato's Crystal Ball	Safe R	November 2, 2020
Daily Kos	Safe R	October 30, 2020
Politico	Safe R	November 2, 2020
RCP	Safe R	October 23, 2020
DDHQ	Safe R	November 3, 2020
538	Safe R	November 2, 2020
Economist	Safe R	November 2, 2020

=== Endorsements ===
Shelley Moore Capito (R)

Unions

- United Mine Workers District 17

Organizations

- Maggie's List
- United States Chamber of Commerce

Publications

- Charleston Gazette-Mail
- The Herald-Dispatch
Paula Jean Swearengin (D)

U.S. senators

- Ed Markey, U.S. senator from Massachusetts
- Bernie Sanders, U.S. senator from Vermont (Independent) and 2020 presidential candidate

U.S. representatives

- Grace Meng, U.S. representative from NY-06

State legislators

- Charles Booker, Kentucky state representative from District 43
- Richard Ojeda, West Virginia State Senator for the 7th district (2016–2019); 2020 presidential and U.S. Senate candidate
- Charlotte Pritt, West Virginia State Senator for the 17th district (1988-1992); candidate for governor in 1992, 1996, and 2016
- Nina Turner, Ohio Senator from District 25 (2008–2014), President of Our Revolution

Notable Individuals

- Cori Bush, Democratic nominee for MO-1
- Marianne Williamson, author, activist, and 2020 presidential candidate
- Andrew Yang, author, entrepreneur, and 2020 presidential candidate

Unions

- Retail, Wholesale and Department Store Union Local 21

Organizations

- 350 Action
- Brand New Congress
- Center for Biological Diversity Action Fund
- Friends of the Earth Action Fund
- Progressive Democrats of America
- Sierra Club
- Sunrise Movement
- Working Families Party

Publications

- The Dominion Post

=== Polling ===
Poll source	Date(s) administered	Sample size (Note: Key: A – all adults RV – registered voters LV – likely voters V – unclear)	Margin of error	Shelley Moore Capito (R)	Paula Jean Swearengin (D)	David Moran (L)	Undecided
Research America Inc.	October 6–9, 2020	450 (LV)	± 4.6%	53%	33%	5%	9%

Hypothetical polling

Poll source	Date(s) administered	Sample size	Margin of error	Shelley Moore Capito (R)	Generic Democrat	Undecided
Public Policy Polling (D) (Note: Poll sponsored by Save My Care)	June 13–14, 2017	762 (V)	± 3.4%	48%	35%	17%

=== Results ===
2020 United States Senate election in West Virginia
Party	Candidate	Votes	%	±%
Republican	Shelley Moore Capito (incumbent)	547,454	70.28%	+8.16%
Democratic	Paula Jean Swearengin	210,309	27.00%	−7.47%
Libertarian	David Moran	21,155	2.72%	+1.09%
Total votes		778,918	100.00%	
Republican hold				

==== By county ====
Capito won all 55 of the state's counties for the second election in a row, earning more than 70% of the vote over Swearengin in all but nine counties.

County	Shelley Moore Capito Republican		Paula Jean Swearengin Democratic		David Moran Libertarian		Margin		Total votes
County	#	%	#	%	#	%	#	%	Total votes
Barbour	5,096	77.00	1,331	20.11	191	2.89	3,765	56.89	6,618
Berkeley	34,162	67.23	15,197	29.91	1,453	2.86	18,965	37.32	50,812
Boone	6,674	75.27	2,016	22.74	177	2.00	4,658	52.53	8,867
Braxton	4,006	72.22	1,395	25.15	146	2.63	2,611	47.07	5,547
Brooke	7,355	70.96	2,699	26.04	311	3.00	4,656	44.92	10,365
Cabell	22,880	62.30	12,979	35.34	864	2.35	9,901	26.96	36,723
Calhoun	2,276	78.81	537	18.59	75	2.60	1,739	60.22	2,888
Clay	2,680	80.38	575	17.25	79	2.37	2,105	63.14	3,334
Doddridge	2,507	82.90	415	13.72	102	3.37	2,092	69.18	3,024
Fayette	11,158	67.79	4,938	30.00	364	2.21	6,220	37.79	16,460
Gilmer	1,939	74.78	586	22.60	68	2.62	1,353	52.18	2,593
Grant	4,544	86.87	534	10.21	153	2.92	4,010	76.66	5,231
Greenbrier	11,042	70.69	4,299	27.52	280	1.79	6,743	43.17	15,621
Hampshire	7,764	79.22	1,764	18.00	272	2.78	6,000	61.22	9,800
Hancock	9,593	71.38	3,484	25.92	362	2.69	6,109	45.46	13,439
Hardy	4,879	78.18	1,196	19.16	166	2.66	3,683	59.01	6,241
Harrison	21,194	70.64	7,807	26.02	1,000	3.33	13,387	44.62	30,001
Jackson	10,298	77.21	2,754	20.65	285	2.14	7,544	56.56	13,337
Jefferson	15,625	57.23	11,033	40.41	646	2.37	4,592	16.82	27,304
Kanawha	50,953	62.85	28,565	35.24	1,550	1.91	22,388	27.62	81,068
Lewis	5,736	77.46	1,431	19.32	238	3.21	4,305	58.14	7,405
Lincoln	5,770	75.73	1,663	21.83	186	2.44	4,107	53.90	7,619
Logan	9,810	79.71	2,266	18.41	231	1.88	7,544	61.30	12,307
Marion	16,722	66.01	7,626	30.10	985	3.89	9,096	35.91	25,333
Marshall	10,655	77.12	2,913	21.08	249	1.80	7,742	56.03	13,817
Mason	8,421	76.06	2,333	21.07	317	2.86	6,088	54.99	11,071
McDowell	4,539	75.44	1,363	22.65	115	1.91	3,176	52.78	6,017
Mercer	18,740	76.48	5,269	21.50	494	2.02	13,471	54.98	24,503
Mineral	9,830	77.95	2,308	18.30	472	3.74	7,522	59.65	12,610
Mingo	7,761	81.57	1,525	16.03	228	2.40	6,236	65.54	9,514
Monongalia	22,140	53.37	17,863	43.06	1,483	3.57	4,277	10.31	41,486
Monroe	4,901	77.34	1,305	20.59	131	2.07	3,596	56.74	6,337
Morgan	6,504	76.30	1,797	21.08	223	2.62	4,707	55.22	8,524
Nicholas	7,976	76.69	2,214	21.29	210	2.02	5,762	55.40	10,400
Ohio	13,373	68.07	5,905	30.06	368	1.87	7,468	38.01	19,646
Pendleton	2,840	79.15	677	18.87	71	1.98	2,163	60.28	3,588
Pleasants	2,628	77.73	634	18.75	119	3.52	1,994	58.98	3,381
Pocahontas	2,707	70.26	1,034	26.84	112	2.91	1,673	43.42	3,853
Preston	9,953	69.71	2,664	18.66	1,660	11.63	7,289	51.05	14,277
Putnam	20,812	73.78	6,784	24.05	613	2.17	14,028	49.73	28,209
Raleigh	23,708	73.02	8,201	25.26	561	1.73	15,507	47.76	32,470
Randolph	8,873	73.91	2,868	23.89	265	2.21	6,005	50.02	12,006
Ritchie	3,474	83.49	569	13.67	118	2.84	2,905	69.81	4,161
Roane	4,260	75.00	1,302	22.92	118	2.08	2,958	52.08	5,680
Summers	3,839	70.86	1,467	27.08	112	2.07	2,372	43.78	5,418
Taylor	5,402	73.95	1,582	21.66	321	4.39	3,820	52.29	7,305
Tucker	2,706	71.38	854	22.53	231	6.09	1,852	48.85	3,791
Tyler	3,095	80.66	612	15.95	130	3.39	2,483	64.71	3,837
Upshur	7,788	77.48	1,953	19.43	310	3.08	5,835	58.05	10,051
Wayne	12,048	73.80	3,895	23.86	383	2.35	8,153	49.94	16,326
Webster	2,585	78.84	613	18.69	81	2.47	1,972	60.14	3,279
Wetzel	4,811	74.12	1,441	22.20	239	3.68	3,370	51.92	6,491
Wirt	2,116	81.32	426	16.37	60	2.31	1,690	64.95	2,602
Wood	27,733	72.75	9,359	24.55	1,031	2.70	18,374	48.20	38,123
Wyoming	6,573	80.08	1,489	18.14	146	1.78	5,084	61.94	8,208
Totals	547,454	70.28	210,309	27.00	21,155	2.72	337,145	43.28	778,918

==== By congressional district ====
Moore Capito won all three congressional districts.

District	Moore Capito	Jean Swearengin	Representative
1st	70%	27%	David McKinley
2nd	69%	29%	Alex Mooney
3rd	73%	25%	Carol Miller

== Notes ==
Partisan clients

Voter samples and additional candidates
