= Amy Vilela =

American politician (born 1974 or 1975)

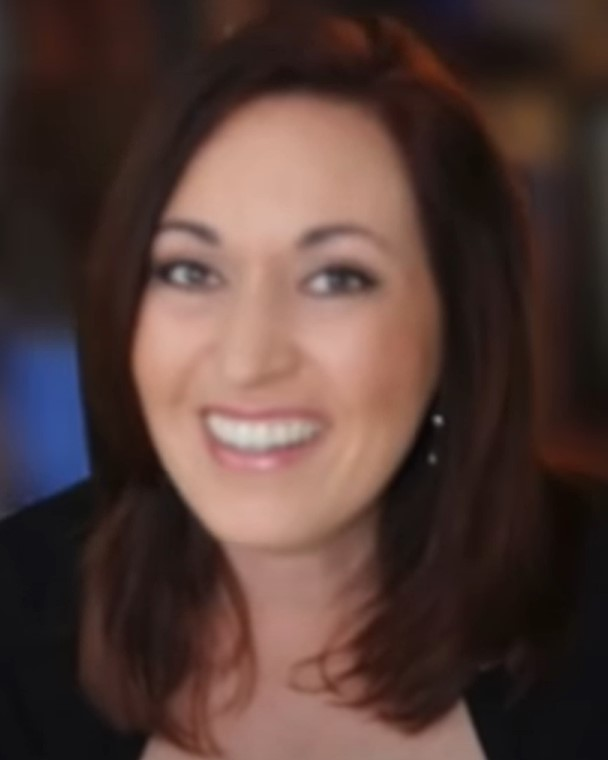
- Vilela in 2019

Personal details
- Born: 1974 or 1975 (age 51–52) Maryland, U.S.
- Party: Democratic
- Spouse: David
- Children: 5 (incl. 1 deceased)
- Education: Park University (BS)

Amy Lynnette Vilela (born 1974 or 1975) is an American politician from the state of Nevada. She worked as an accountant before becoming an advocate for single-payer healthcare, also known as Medicare for All, after her daughter was turned away from a hospital and died of a heart attack because the hospital thought she lacked health insurance.

Vilela ran for the United States House of Representatives in 2018 and 2022, and co-chaired the Nevada campaign for the Bernie Sanders 2020 presidential campaign.

== Early life, education, and career ==
Vilela was born in Maryland. Her father was an ironworker and her mother was a secretary. They divorced during her childhood. Vilela became a mother when she was a teenager. She ended up homeless while raising her children, and used public assistance. She earned a bachelor's degree in business and accounting from Park University in Missouri.

She became the chief financial officer of the Tammy Lynn Center, a nonprofit organization serving people with intellectual and developmental disabilities. She then became the chief financial officer at Foresee Consulting, a construction management consulting firm.

== Political career ==
In 2018, Vilela ran in the Democratic Party primary election for the United States House of Representatives for Nevada's 4th congressional district, which was held by Ruben Kihuen. Vilela met Kihuen at a forum in 2017, where he declined to support Medicare for All. Kihuen dropped out of the race due to an unrelated scandal, and Steven Horsford won with 62% of the vote, while Vilela finished in third with 9%. The documentary Knock Down the House showcased Vilela's campaign, alongside the primary campaigns of Alexandria Ocasio-Cortez, Paula Jean Swearengin, and Cori Bush, three other Democrats who ran for Congress in the 2018 midterm elections. It premiered at the 2019 Sundance Film Festival and was released on Netflix on May 1, 2019.

During the 2020 United States presidential election, Vilela served as the Nevada state co-chair for the Bernie Sanders 2020 presidential campaign. In January 2021, Vilela announced that she would run for Nevada's 1st congressional district in the 2022 elections, held by fellow Democrat Dina Titus. Vilela received 20.2% of the vote in the primary, losing to Titus, who received 79.8%.

== Personal life ==
Vilela married David, a United States Air Force officer, in 2009. They are raising four children.

In 2015, Vilela's 22-year-old daughter died of a heart attack. She had presented to Centennial Hills Hospital with the symptoms of a deep vein thrombosis. Sometime later, following a flight, the blood clot broke off and became a pulmonary embolism. Following her daughter's death, Vilela became an advocate for Medicare for All. She founded a Nevada chapter of Healthcare-NOW!, which lobbies for single-payer healthcare. In 2017, she filed a lawsuit against Centennial Hills Hospital.
