= 2008 United States House of Representatives elections in Nevada =

- November 4, 2008

All 3 Nevada seats to the United States House of Representatives
	Majority party	Minority party
Party	Democratic	Republican
Last election	1	2
Seats won	2	1
Seat change	▲1	▼1
Popular vote	457,320	383,548
Percentage	50.35%	42.23%
Swing	▲0.27%	▼3.06%

Democratic
40–50%
50–60%
60–70%
Republican
40–50%
50–60%
60–70%
70–80%

The 2008 congressional elections in Nevada were held on November 4, 2008, to determine who would represent the state of Nevada in the United States House of Representatives, coinciding with the presidential election. The election coincided with the 2008 U.S. presidential election. Representatives are elected for two-year terms; those elected would serve in the 111th Congress from January 3, 2009 until January 3, 2011.

Nevada had three seats in the House, apportioned according to the 2000 United States census. Its 2007–2008 congressional delegation consisted of two Republicans and one Democrat. After the election, it consisted of one Republican and two Democrats, with District 3 changing from Republican to Democratic. CQ Politics had forecasted districts 2 and 3 to be at some risk for the incumbent party.

== Overview ==
=== Statewide ===
Party	Candidates	Votes		Seats		
Party	Candidates	No.	%	No.	+/–	%
Democratic	3	457,320	50.35	2	Steady	66.67
Republican	3	383,548	42.23	1	Steady	33.33
Independent American	3	22,813	2.51	0	Steady	0.0
Libertarian	3	20,432	2.25	0	Steady	0.0
Independent	1	14,922	1.64	0	Steady	0.0
Green	2	9,219	1.02	0	Steady	0.0
Total	15	908,254	100.0	3	Steady	100.0

Popular vote
Democratic	50.35%
Republican	42.23%
Independent American	2.51%
Libertarian	2.25%
Green	1.02%
Other	1.64%

House seats
Democratic	66.67%
Republican	33.33%

=== By district ===
Results of the 2008 United States House of Representatives elections in Nevada by district:

District	Democratic		Republican		Others		Total		Result
District	Votes	%	Votes	%	Votes	%	Votes	%	Result
District 1	154,860	67.65%	64,837	28.32%	9,225	4.03%	228,922	100.0%	Democratic Hold
District 2	136,548	41.44%	170,771	51.82%	22,201	6.74%	329,520	100.0%	Republican Hold
District 3	165,912	47.43%	147,940	42.29%	35,960	10.28%	349,812	100.0%	Democratic Gain
Total	457,320	50.35%	383,548	42.23%	67,386	7.42%	908,254	100.0%	

== District 1 ==
2008 Nevada's 1st congressional district election
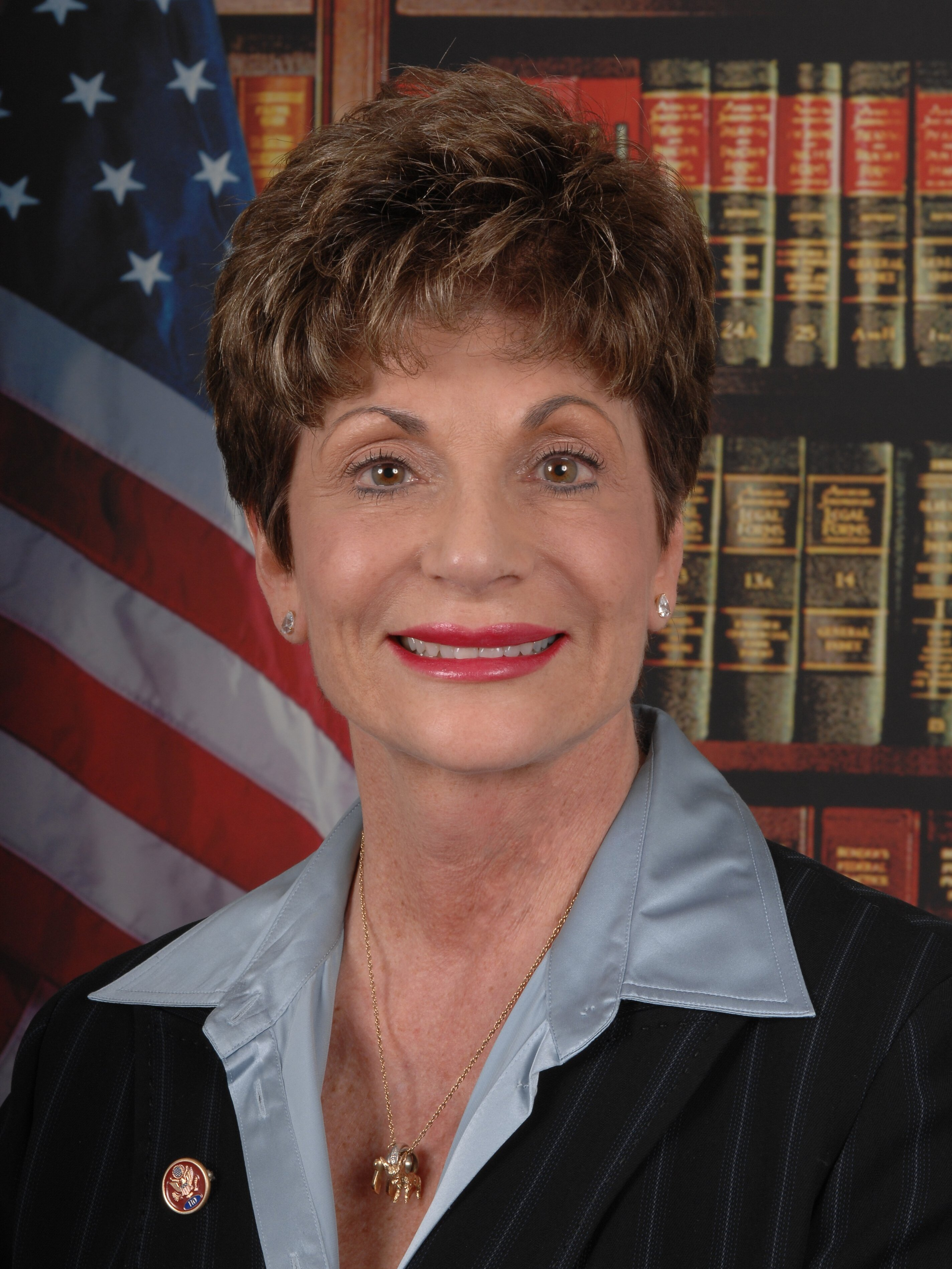

Nominee	Shelley Berkley	Kenneth Wegner
Party	Democratic	Republican
Popular vote	154,860	64,837
Percentage	67.6%	28.3%
- County results Berkley: 60–70%
U.S. Representative before election
Shelley Berkley
Democratic
Elected U.S. Representative
Shelley Berkley
Democratic

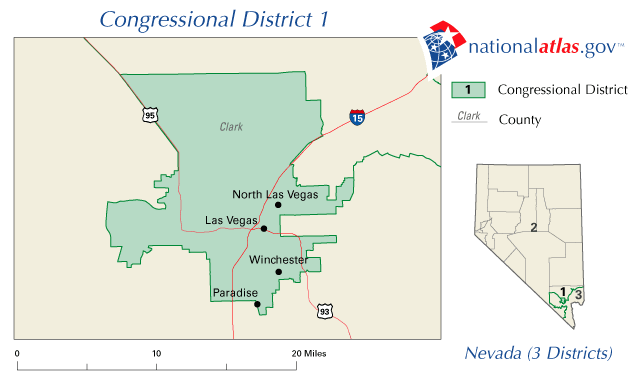

This district covered most of the City of Las Vegas, as well as parts of North Las Vegas and parts of unincorporated Clark County. Incumbent Democrat Shelley Berkley, who had represented the district since 1999, ran for re-election. She was re-elected with 51.2% of the vote in 2006 and the district had a PVI of D+9.

=== Democratic primary ===
==== Candidates ====
===== Nominee =====
- Shelley Berkley, incumbent U.S. Representative

===== Eliminated in primary =====
- Mark Budetich Jr, Merchant Marine electrician and candidate for the 3rd district in 2002, 2004 and 2006

==== Results ====
Democratic primary results
Party	Candidate	Votes	%
Democratic	Shelley Berkley (incumbent)	19,444	89.7
Democratic	Mark Budetich Jr	2,222	10.3
Total votes		21,666	100.0

=== Republican primary ===
==== Candidates ====
===== Nominee =====
- Kenneth Wegner, Gulf War veteran, part-time bail enforcement agent, candidate for the U.S. Senate in 2004 and nominee for this seat in 2006

===== Eliminated in primary =====
- Chris Dyer, veteran and restaurateur
- Eve Ellingwood, former judge
- Ed Hamilton, former Chrysler executive and candidate for the U.S. Senate in 2006
- Ray Kornfield, casino worker
- Russ Mickelson, former Air Force pilot, retired Defense Department employee, for this seat in candidate in 2006 and nominee in 2004
- Mike Powers, candidate for Mayor of Honolulu

==== Results ====
Republican primary results
Party	Candidate	Votes	%
Republican	Kenneth Wegner	4,359	34.7
Republican	Russ Mickelson	2,490	19.8
Republican	Chris Dyer	1,847	14.7
Republican	Eve Ellingwood	1,137	9.0
Republican	Ray Kornfield	1,090	8.7
Republican	Mike Powers	896	7.1
Republican	Ed Hamilton	761	6.0
Total votes		12,580	100.0

=== Libertarian primary ===
==== Candidates ====
===== Nominee =====
- Jim Duensing, radio talk show host, nominee for this seat in 2004 and 2006

=== Independent American primary ===
==== Candidates ====
===== Nominee =====
- Caren Alexander

=== General election ===
==== Predictions ====
Source	Ranking	As of
The Cook Political Report	Safe D	November 6, 2008
Rothenberg	Safe D	November 2, 2008
Sabato's Crystal Ball	Safe D	November 6, 2008
Real Clear Politics	Safe D	November 7, 2008
CQ Politics	Safe D	November 6, 2008

==== Results ====
Nevada's 1st congressional district election, 2008
Party	Candidate	Votes	%
Democratic	Shelley Berkley (incumbent)	154,860	67.6
Republican	Kenneth Wegner	64,837	28.3
Independent American	Caren Alexander	4,697	2.1
Libertarian	Jim Duensing	4,528	2.0
Majority		90,023	39.3
Total votes		228,922	100.0
Democratic hold			

==== Finances ====
===== Campaigns =====
Candidate (party)	Raised	Spent	Cash on hand
Shelley Berkley (D)	$2,164,787	$1,985,063	$853,233
Kenneth Wegner (R)	$15,747	$15,794	$0
Jim Duensing (L)	Unreported		
Darnell Roberts (IN)	Unreported		

===== Outside Spending =====
Candidate (party)	Supported	Opposed
Shelley Berkley (D)	$19,108	$0
Kenneth Wegner (R)	$1	$0
Jim Duensing (L)	$0	$0
Darnell Roberts (IN)	$0	$0

== District 2 ==
2008 Nevada's 2nd congressional district election
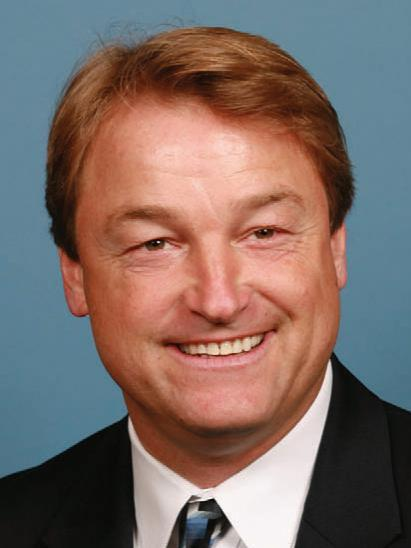

Nominee	Dean Heller	Jill Derby
Party	Republican	Democratic
Popular vote	170,771	136,548
Percentage	51.8%	41.4%
- County results Heller: 40–50% 50–60% 60–70% 70–80% Derby: 40–50%
U.S. Representative before election
Dean Heller
Republican
Elected U.S. Representative
Dean Heller
Republican

This district covered all of Nevada except for parts of Clark County. Reno, along with surrounding Washoe County, casts about 70% of the district's vote. The 2nd District had been represented by Republicans continuously since its creation. Incumbent Republican Dean Heller, who had represented the district since 2007, ran for re-election. He was elected with 50.3% of the vote in 2006 and the district had a PVI of R+8.

=== Republican primary ===
==== Candidates ====
===== Nominee =====
- Dean Heller (Carson City), incumbent U.S. Representative

===== Eliminated in primary =====
- James Smack, pawn shop manager

==== Results ====
Republican primary results
Party	Candidate	Votes	%
Republican	Dean Heller (incumbent)	43,112	86.0
Republican	James Smack	7,009	14.0
Total votes		50,121	100.0

=== Democratic primary ===
==== Candidates ====
===== Nominee =====
- Jill Derby (Gardnerville), chair of the Nevada Democratic Party, former Regent for the University and Community College System of Nevada and nominee for this seat in 2006

=== General election ===
==== Endorsements ====
Jill Derby (D)

Organizations

- Democratic Congressional Campaign Committee "Red to Blue" Program

==== Polling ====
Poll source	Date(s) administered	Sample size (Note: Key: A – all adults RV – registered voters LV – likely voters V – unclear)	Margin of error	Dean Heller (R)	Jill Derby (D)	Others	Undecided
Mason-Dixon (Las Vegas Review-Journal)	October 28–29, 2008	400 (LV)	±5.0%	50%	37%	4%	9%
Mason-Dixon (Las Vegas Review-Journal)	October 8–9, 2008	221 (LV)	±4.0%	51%	38%	1%	10%

==== Predictions ====
Source	Ranking	As of
The Cook Political Report	Lean R	November 6, 2008
Rothenberg	Likely R	November 2, 2008
Sabato's Crystal Ball	Lean R	November 6, 2008
Real Clear Politics	Safe R	November 7, 2008
CQ Politics	Lean R	November 6, 2008

==== Results ====
Nevada's 2nd congressional district election, 2008
Party	Candidate	Votes	%
Republican	Dean Heller (incumbent)	170,771	51.8
Democratic	Jill Derby	136,548	41.4
Independent American	John Everhart	11,179	3.4
Libertarian	Sean Patrick Morse	5,740	1.7
Green	Craig Bergland	5,282	1.6
Majority		34,223	10.4
Total votes		329,520	100.0
Republican hold			

==== Finances ====
===== Campaigns =====
Candidate (party)	Raised	Spent	Cash on hand
Dean Heller (R)	$1,713,939	$1,605,840	$133,757
Jill Derby (D)	$1,109,169	$1,121,582	$4,085
Sean Patrick Morse (L)	Unreported		
James Krochus (IA)	Unreported		
Craig Bergland (G)	Unreported		

===== Outside Spending =====
Candidate (party)	Supported	Opposed
Dean Heller (R)	$128,416	$10,278
Jill Derby (D)	$42,810	$0
Sean Patrick Morse (L)	$0	$0
John Everhart (IA)	$0	$0
Craig Bergland (G)	$0	$0

== District 3 ==
2008 Nevada's 3rd congressional district election
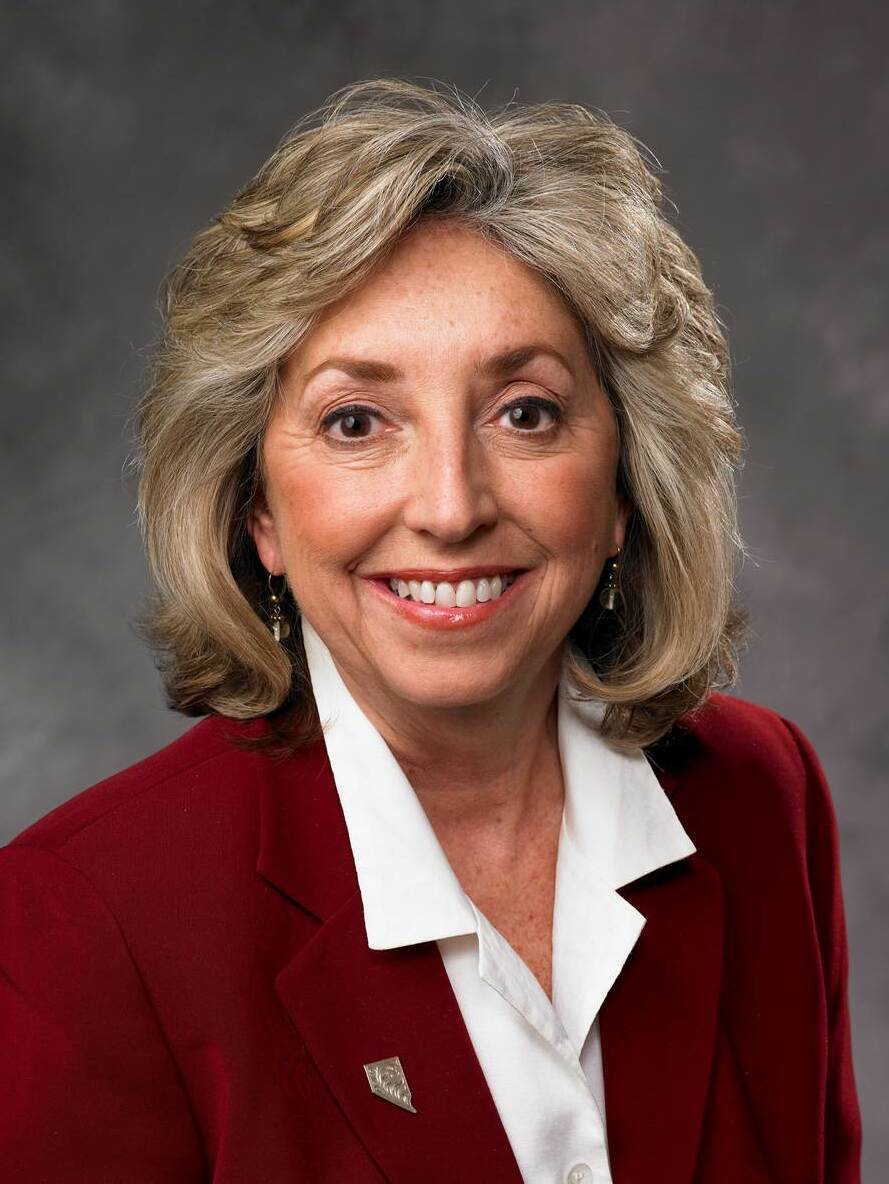

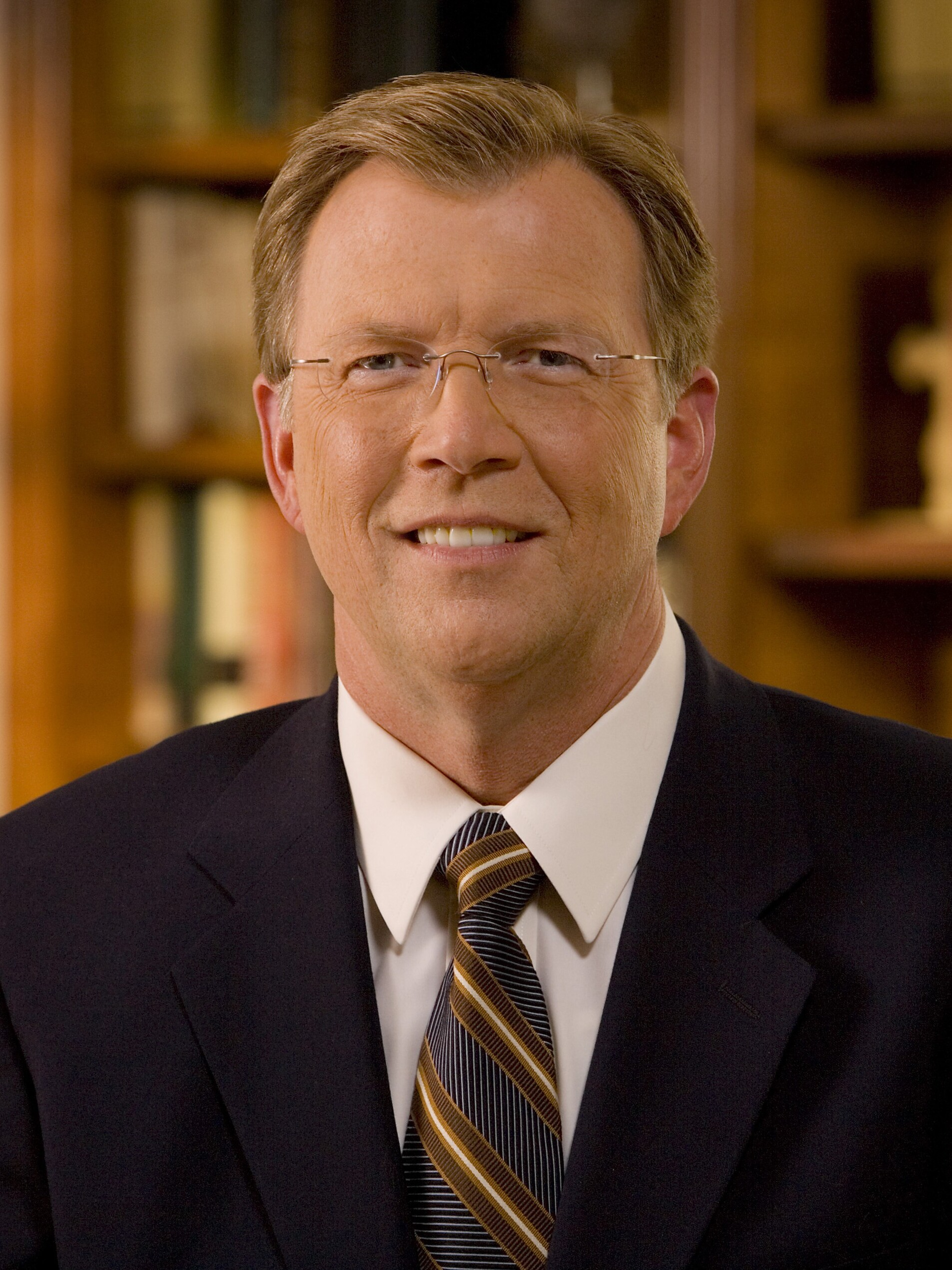
Nominee	Dina Titus	Jon Porter
Party	Democratic	Republican
Popular vote	165,912	147,940
Percentage	47.4%	42.3%
- County results Titus: 40–50%
U.S. Representative before election
Jon Porter
Republican
Elected U.S. Representative
Dina Titus
Democratic

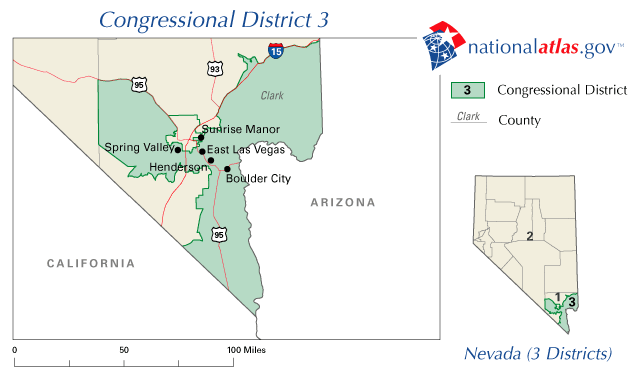

This district covered the suburbs of Las Vegas, including Henderson, parts of North Las Vegas and Summerlin, and much of unincorporated Clark County. Incumbent Republican Jon Porter, who had represented the district since 2003, ran for re-election. He was re-elected with 48.5% of the vote in 2006 and the district had a PVI of D+1.

=== Republican primary ===
==== Candidates ====
===== Nominee =====
- Jon Porter (Boulder City), incumbent U.S. Representative

===== Eliminated in primary =====
- Carl Bunce
- Jesse Law

==== Results ====
Republican primary results
Party	Candidate	Votes	%
Republican	Jon Porter (incumbent)	21,955	81.6
Republican	Jesse Law	3,030	11.3
Republican	Carl Bunce	1,911	7.1
Total votes		26,896	100.0

=== Democratic primary ===
Leading Democratic candidates included Fraud Examiner Andrew Martin and Clark County prosecutor Robert Daskas, but Daskas dropped out in late April, citing family concerns. After losing their top candidate, the Democratic Party quickly recruited Titus, who had previously declined to run.

==== Candidates ====
===== Nominee =====
- Dina Titus (Las Vegas), Nevada Senate Minority Leader and nominee for Governor in 2006

===== Eliminated in primary =====
- Barry Michaels, chiropractor, ex convict and candidate for this seat in 2006
- Anna Nevenic, writer, peace activist, candidate for this seat in 2004 and 2006
- Carlo "Tex" Poliak, trash collector, Republican candidate for Governor in 2002 and for U.S. Senate in 2004

===== Withdrawn =====
- Robert Daskas, Clark County prosecutor
- Andrew Martin, fraud examiner (running for the state assembly)

===== Declined =====
- Maggie Carlton, state senator
- Tessa Hafen, former press secretary for US Senate Minority Leader Harry Reid and nominee for this seat in 2006
- Lawrence Lehrner, nephrologist and husband of Shelley Berkley
- Rory Reid, Clark County Commission Chair
- Richard Perkins, Henderson Police Chief and former Speaker of the Nevada Assembly

==== Results ====
Democratic primary results
Party	Candidate	Votes	%
Democratic	Dina Titus	22,232	84.7
Democratic	Barry Michaels	2,312	8.8
Democratic	Anna Nevenic	1,114	4.2
Democratic	Carlo "Tex" Poliak	587	2.2
Total votes		26,245	100.0

=== Libertarian primary ===
==== Candidates ====
===== Nominee =====
- Joseph Silvestri, teacher, realtor, nominee for this seat in 2004 and 2006

=== Green primary ===
==== Candidates ====
===== Nominee =====
- Bob Giaquinta

=== Independent American primary ===
==== Candidates ====
===== Nominee =====
- Floyd Fitzgibbons, insurance agency owner and nominee for State Controller in 2006

=== Other Candidates ===
- Jeffrey Reeves (Independent)

=== General election ===
==== Campaign ====
Porter was considered to be at risk due to the increasingly Democratic electorate in the 3rd District, having won by only 48% to 46% in 2006 against a former aide to U.S. Senate Majority Leader Harry Reid. George W. Bush had barely won this district with 50% to 49% for John Kerry in 2004.

===== Endorsements =====
Dina Titus (D)

Organizations

- Democratic Congressional Campaign Committee "Red to Blue" Program

==== Polling ====
Poll source	Date(s) administered	Sample size	Margin of error	Jon Porter (R)	Dina Titus (D)	Others	Undecided
Mason-Dixon (Las Vegas Review-Journal)	October 28–29, 2008	400 (LV)	±5.0%	44%	44%	3%	9%
Mason-Dixon (Las Vegas Review-Journal)	October 8–9, 2008	236 (LV)	±4.0%	43%	40%	3%	13%

==== Predictions ====
Source	Ranking	As of
The Cook Political Report	Tossup	November 6, 2008
Rothenberg	Tilt D (flip)	November 2, 2008
Sabato's Crystal Ball	Lean D (flip)	November 6, 2008
Real Clear Politics	Tossup	November 7, 2008
CQ Politics	Tossup	November 6, 2008

==== Results ====
Nevada's 3rd congressional district election, 2008
Party	Candidate	Votes	%
Democratic	Dina Titus	165,912	47.4
Republican	Jon Porter (incumbent)	147,940	42.3
Independent	Jeffrey Reeves	14,922	4.3
Libertarian	Joseph Silvestri	10,164	2.9
Independent American	Floyd Fitzgibbons	6,937	2.0
Green	Bob Giaquinta	3,937	1.1
Majority		17,972	5.1
Total votes		349,812	100.0
Democratic gain from Republican			

==== Finances ====
===== Campaigns =====
Candidate (party)	Raised	Spent	Cash on hand
Jon Porter (R)	$2,946,133	$2,873,337	$26,133
Dina Titus (D)	$1,856,736	$1,777,641	$79,095
Joseph Silvestri (L)	Unreported		
Floyd Fitzgibbons (IA)	Unreported		
Bob Giaquinta (G)	Unreported		
Jeffery Reeves (I)	Unreported		

===== Outside Spending =====
Candidate (party)	Supported	Opposed
Jon Porter (R)	$295,757	$472,721
Dina Titus (D)	$549,006	$596,775
Joseph Silvestri (L)	$0	$0
JFloyd Fitzgibbons (IA)	$0	$0
Bob Giaquinta (G)	$0	$0
Jeffery Reeves (I)	$0	$0

== Notes ==
Official campaign websites

District 3

- Jon Porter (R) campaign website
- Dina Titus (D) campaign website
- Joseph Silvestri (L) campaign website
- Bob Giaquinta (G) campaign website
- Jeffrey Reeves (I) campaign website Archived February 21, 2009, at the Wayback Machine
