= 2006 United States House of Representatives elections in Nevada =

- November 7, 2006

All 3 Nevada seats to the United States House of Representatives
	Majority party	Minority party
Party	Republican	Democratic
Last election	2 seats, 53.16%	1 seats, 42.19%
Seats before	2	1
Seats won	2	1
Seat change	Steady	Steady
Popular vote	260,317	287,879
Percentage	45.29%	50.08%
Swing	▼7.87%	▲7.89%

Democratic
40–50%
50–60%
60–70%
Republican
40–50%
50–60%
60–70%

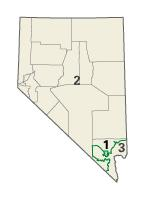
Nevada's three congressional districts

The Nevada congressional elections of 2006 took place on November 7, 2006, when each of the state's three congressional districts elected a representative to the United States House of Representatives. Nevada was considered a battleground state due to the close victory margins. The primaries were held on August 15.

Nevada was one of seven states in which the party that won the state's popular vote did not win a majority of seats in 2006, the other states being Indiana, New Mexico, Michigan, Ohio, Iowa, and Wisconsin.

== Overview ==
=== Statewide ===
Party	Candidates	Votes		Seats		
Party	Candidates	No.	%	No.	+/–	%
Democratic	3	287,879	50.08	1	Steady	33.33
Republican	3	260,317	45.29	2	Steady	66.67
Independent American	3	13,107	2.28	0	Steady	0.0
Libertarian	2	8,000	1.39	0	Steady	0.0
Independent	1	5,524	0.96	0	Steady	0.0
Total	12	574,827	100.0	3	Steady	100.0

Popular vote
Democratic	50.08%
Republican	45.29%
Independent American	2.28%
Libertarian	1.39%
Other	0.96%

House seats
Republican	66.67%
Democratic	33.33%

=== By district ===
Results of the 2006 United States House of Representatives elections in Nevada by district:

District	Democratic		Republican		Others		Total		Result
District	Votes	%	Votes	%	Votes	%	Votes	%	Result
District 1	85,025	64.84%	40,917	31.20%	5,182	3.95%	131,124	100.0%	Democratic Hold
District 2	104,593	44.94%	117,168	50.35%	10,963	4.71%	232,724	100.0%	Republican Hold
District 3	98,261	46.57%	102,232	48.46%	10,486	4.97%	210,979	100.0%	Republican Hold
Total	287,879	50.08%	260,317	45.29%	26,631	4.63%	574,827	100.0%	

== District 1 ==
2006 Nevada's 1st congressional district election
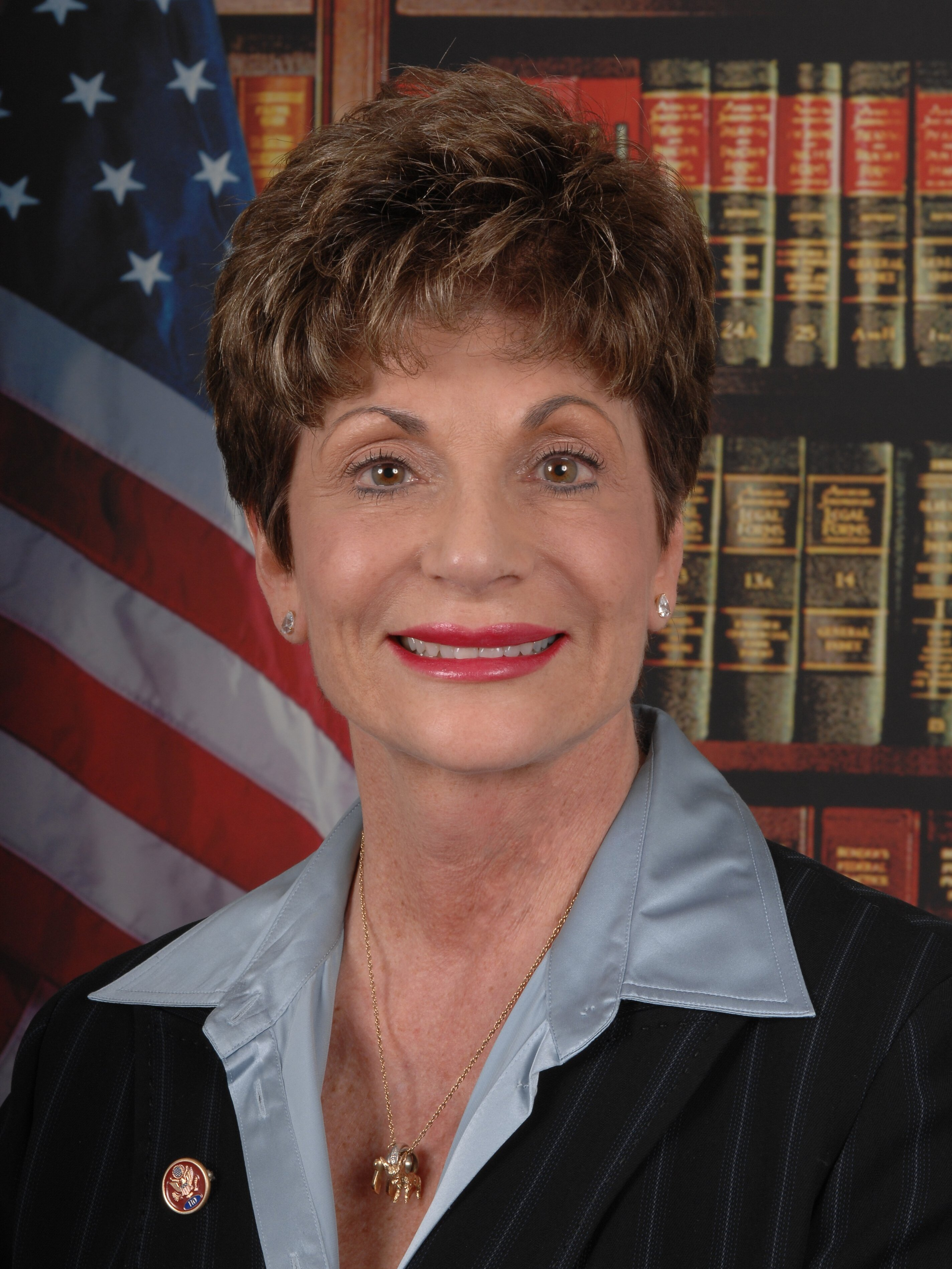

Nominee	Shelley Berkley	Kenneth Wegner
Party	Democratic	Republican
Popular vote	85,025	40,917
Percentage	64.8%	31.2%
- County results Berkley: 60–70%
U.S. Representative before election
Shelley Berkley
Democratic
Elected U.S. Representative
Shelley Berkley
Democratic

Incumbent Democrat Shelley Berkley, who had represented the district since 1999, ran for re-election. She was re-elected with 66.0% of the vote in 2004 and the district had a PVI of D+9.

=== Democratic primary ===
==== Candidates ====
===== Nominee =====
- Shelley Berkley, incumbent U.S. Representative

===== Eliminated in primary =====
- Asimo Sondra "Silver" Lawlor

==== Results ====
Democratic primary results
Party	Candidate	Votes	%
Democratic	Shelley Berkley (incumbent)	29,655	90.1
Democratic	Asimo Sondra "Silver" Lawlor	3,267	9.9
Total votes		32,922	100.0

=== Republican primary ===
==== Candidates ====
===== Nominee =====
- Kenneth Wegner, Gulf War veteran and candidate for the U.S. Senate in 2004

===== Eliminated in primary =====
- Russ Mickelson, former Air Force pilot, retired Defense Department employee and nominee for this seat in 2004
- Michael Monroe, handyman

==== Results ====
Republican primary results
Party	Candidate	Votes	%
Republican	Kenneth Wegner	10,615	51.2
Republican	Russ Mickelson	7,907	38.2
Republican	Michael Monroe	2,193	10.6
Total votes		20,715	100.0

=== Libertarian primary ===
==== Candidates ====
===== Nominee =====
- Jim Duensing, radio talk show host and nominee for this seat in 2004

=== Independent American primary ===
==== Candidates ====
===== Nominee =====
- Darnell Roberts

=== Reform primary ===
==== Candidates ====
===== Withdrawn =====
- Bruce Westcott, businessman and Republican candidate for Governor in 1998 & 2002

=== General election ===
==== Predictions ====
Source	Ranking	As of
The Cook Political Report	Safe D	November 6, 2006
Rothenberg	Safe D	November 6, 2006
Sabato's Crystal Ball	Safe D	November 6, 2006
Real Clear Politics	Safe D	November 7, 2006
CQ Politics	Safe D	November 7, 2006

==== Results ====
Nevada's 1st congressional district election, 2006
Party	Candidate	Votes	%
Democratic	Shelley Berkley (incumbent)	85,025	64.8
Republican	Kenneth Wegner	40,917	31.2
Libertarian	Jim Duensing	2,843	2.2
Independent American	Darnell Roberts	2,339	1.8
Majority		44,108	33.6
Total votes		131,124	100.0
Democratic hold			

==== Finances ====
===== Campaigns =====
Candidate (party)	Raised	Spent	Cash on hand
Shelley Berkley (D)	$1,742,767	$1,674,409	$673,509
Kenneth Wegner (R)	$96,582	$96,534	$48
Jim Duensing (L)	Unreported		
Darnell Roberts (IN)	Unreported		

===== Outside Spending =====
Candidate (party)	Supported	Opposed
Shelley Berkley (D)	$301	$0
Kenneth Wegner (R)	$0	$0
Jim Duensing (L)	$0	$0
Darnell Roberts (IN)	$0	$0

== District 2 ==
2006 Nevada's 2nd congressional district election
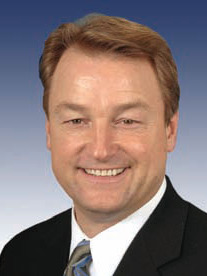

Nominee	Dean Heller	Jill Derby
Party	Republican	Democratic
Popular vote	117,119	104,593
Percentage	50.4%	44.9%
- County results Heller: 40–50% 50–60% 60–70% Derby: 40–50%
U.S. Representative before election
Jim Gibbons
Republican
Elected U.S. Representative
Dean Heller
Republican

The district covers all of Nevada outside of Clark County as well as some parts of Clark County. Incumbent Republican Jim Gibbons, who had represented the district since 1997, opted to run for governor rather than re-election, having considered a run for Senate in 2004. He was re–elected with 67.2% of the vote in 2004 and the district had a PVI of R+8.

=== Republican primary ===
==== Candidates ====
===== Nominee =====
- Dean Heller, Secretary of State of Nevada

===== Eliminated in primary =====
- Sharron Angle, state representative
- Dawn Gibbons, former state representative and wife of Jim Gibbons
- Richard Gilster, pastor
- Glenn Thomas, retired aerospace engineer

===== Declined =====
- Kathy Augustine, Nevada State Controller
- Jim Gibbons, incumbent U.S. Representative and nominee for Governor in 1994 (running for Governor)
- Brian Krolicki, Nevada State Treasurer (running for Lieutenant Governor)

==== Campaign ====
There was a "fiercely contested and often bruising" three-way race (with two minor candidates raising the total to five candidates). The Club for Growth poured in over $1 million backing Angle, and ran ads attacking both Heller and Gibbons as being "liberal" and in favor of tax increases.

==== Endorsements ====
Sharron Angle

U.S. Representatives

- Marilyn Musgrave, U.S. representative from Colorado's 4th congressional district (2003–present)
- Mike Pence, U.S. representative from Indiana's 6th congressional district (2001–present)
- Jim Ryun, U.S. representative from Kansas's 2nd congressional district (1996–present)
- Pat Toomey, U.S. representative from Pennsylvania's 15th congressional district (1999–2005)

Organizations

- Club for Growth
- National Right to Life Committee
- NRA Political Victory Fund
- Susan B. Anthony List
Dawn Gibbons

State legislators

- Maurice Washington, state senator
Dean Heller

State officials

- Kenny Guinn, Governor of Nevada

U.S. Representatives

- Jon Porter, U.S. representative from Nevada's 3rd congressional district (2003–present)

State legislators

- Mark Amodei, state senator

==== Polling ====
Poll source	Date(s) administered	Sample size (Note: Key: A – all adults RV – registered voters LV – likely voters V – unclear)	Margin of error	Sharron Angle	Kathy Augustine	Dawn Gibbons	Richard Gilster	Dean Heller	Glenn Thomas	Undecided
Mason-Dixon (Las Vegas Review-Journal)	August 8–11, 2006	400 (LV)	±5.0%	32%	–	19%	1%	32%	1%	16%
Neighborhood Research (R)	August 8–10, 2006	?	±5.6%	33%	–	21%	–	19%	–	27%
Global Strategy Group (Nevada Credit Union League)	August 1–3, 2006	?	±5.0%	26%	–	23%	–	30%	–	21%
Neighborhood Research (R)	July 26–27, 2006	?	±5.6%	19%	–	22%	–	24%	–	35%
Hart Research (D)	July 20–22, 2006	?	±4.0%	19%	–	19%	–	35%	–	27%
Research 2000	May 12–14, 2006	400 (V)	±5.0%	15%	–	32%	–	27%	–	26%
Hart Research (D)	March 12–13, 2006	?	±4.7%	12%	–	34%	–	25%	–	29%
Mason-Dixon (Las Vegas Review-Journal)	October 21–24, 2005	?	±7.0%	14%	–	23%	–	37%	–	26%
Strategic Solutions	April 27, 2005	325 (V)	±5.6%	8%	3%	16%	–	28%	–	43%

==== Results ====
Results by county Heller: 30–40%; 40–50%; 50–60%; Angle: 30–40%; 40–50%

Republican primary results
Party	Candidate	Votes	%
Republican	Dean Heller	24,770	35.9
Republican	Sharron Angle	24,349	35.3
Republican	Dawn Gibbons	17,317	25.1
Republican	Glenn Thomas	1,835	2.7
Republican	Richard Gilster	721	1.0
Total votes		68,992	100.0

===== Refusal to concede =====
After the primary, Angle refused to concede, complaining of voting irregularities that disenfranchised many voters in her popular home base of Washoe County, which includes Reno and is by far the district's most populous and vote-rich jurisdiction. Rather than calling for a recount — the typical route for candidates who challenge close election outcomes — Angle demanded to have the entire primary invalidated and held again. CQPolitics.com noted "Some have charged Angle’s decision to call for a special primary was based on economics: Had she demanded a recount, Angle would have been responsible for the cost of the procedure unless the result vindicated her request for it. That would not be the case if the courts were to order a primary do-over."

Exacerbating the disunity of the Nevada GOP, Nevada's Republican Party chairman, Paul Adams, announced his support for Angle's court challenge.

At a September 1 state court hearing, District Judge Bill Maddox rejected Angle's request on grounds that the state court lacks jurisdiction in congressional elections. According to Maddox, only the U.S. House of Representatives has standing to call for a new election. At that point, Angle conceded the race.

=== Democratic primary ===
==== Candidates ====
===== Nominee =====
- Jill Derby, Regent for the University and Community College System of Nevada

===== Declined =====
- Frankie Sue Del Papa, former Attorney General of Nevada, former Secretary of State of Nevada, candidate for Governor in 1998 and U.S. Senate in 2000

=== Libertarian primary ===
==== Candidates ====
===== Nominee =====
- Scott Babb

=== Independent American primary ===
==== Candidates ====
===== Nominee =====
- James Krochus

=== Other Candidates ===
- Daniel Rosen (Independent)

=== General election ===
==== Campaign ====
The bruising GOP primary, as compared to the Democratic situation, was reflected in the cash reserves reported by each candidate in their pre-primary filings with the Federal Election Commission. Derby had $444,000 on hand as of July 26, out of $748,000 raised. Heller had 260,000 left — and that was with 20 days left to go before the actual primary — out of $904,000 in total receipts, which included $108,000 in funds from his personal accounts.

In late August, CQPolitics.com analyzed the race: "Although the 2nd District generally leans Republican, Derby's competitive position in the general election was already strengthened by the fact that she was unopposed in the Aug. 15 Democratic primary while the Republicans staged a bruising battle among three well-known candidates."

==== Endorsements ====
Jill Derby (D)

Organizations

- Democratic Congressional Campaign Committee "Red to Blue" Program

==== Polling ====
The Las Vegas Sun, quoting University of Nevada-Reno political scientist Eric Herzik, noted that the intra-fighting has given the Democratic Party a chance in this otherwise Republican leaning district. "Jill Derby was already doing everything right, and then she gets this gift," he said. "How do you turn a safe district into a competitive one? Fight among yourselves. Republicans here have won because they've stayed united and they continue to turn out. Now you've got partisan infighting, and Adams' leadership is aiding and abetting that - in an already bad year for Republicans."

Poll source	Date(s) administered	Sample size	Margin of error	Dean Heller (R)	Jill Derby (D)	James Krochus (IA)	Daniel Rosen (I)	Undecided
Mason-Dixon (Las Vegas Review-Journal)	October 26–30, 2006	400 (RV)	±5.0%	47%	39%	1%	1%	12%
Research 2000 (Reno Gazette-Journal/KRNV-DT)	October 23–25, 2006	600 (LV)	±4.0%	48%	40%	–	–	12%
Mellman Group (Derby–D)	October 14–16, 2006	400 (V)	±4.9%	40%	40%	5%		15%
Mason-Dixon (Las Vegas Review-Journal)	September 19–21, 2006	400 (RV)	±5.0%	45%	42%	1%	–	12%
Mellman Group (Derby–D)	September 7–9, 2006	?	±5.0%	44%	35%	5%		15%
Research 2000 (Reno Gazette-Journal/KRNV-DT)	September 5–7, 2006	600 (LV)	±4.0%	45%	37%	–	–	18%
Research 2000 (Reno Gazette-Journal/KRNV-DT)	May 12–15, 2006	400 (LV)	±5.0%	39%	31%	–	–	30%
Hart Research (D)	March 12–13, 2006	429 (RV)	±4.7%	43%	25%	–	–	32%

Hypothetical polling

===== With Angle =====
Poll source	Date(s) administered	Sample size	Margin of error	Sharron Angle (R)	Jill Derby (D)	Undecided
Research 2000 (Reno Gazette-Journal/KRNV-DT)	May 12–15, 2006	400 (LV)	±5.0%	31%	30%	39%
Hart Research (D)	March 12–13, 2006	429 (RV)	±4.7%	32%	28%	40%

===== With Gibbons =====
Poll source	Date(s) administered	Sample size	Margin of error	Dawn Gibbons (R)	Jill Derby (D)	Undecided
Research 2000 (Reno Gazette-Journal/KRNV-DT)	May 12–15, 2006	400 (LV)	±5.0%	35%	30%	35%
Hart Research (D)	March 12–13, 2006	429 (RV)	±4.7%	37%	33%	30%

==== Predictions ====
Source	Ranking	As of
The Cook Political Report	Lean R	November 6, 2006
Rothenberg	Likely R	November 6, 2006
Sabato's Crystal Ball	Lean R	November 6, 2006
Real Clear Politics	Lean R	November 7, 2006
CQ Politics	Lean R	November 7, 2006

==== Results ====
Nevada's 2nd congressional district election, 2006
Party	Candidate	Votes	%
Republican	Dean Heller	117,168	50.3
Democratic	Jill Derby	104,593	44.9
Independent	Daniel Rosen	5,524	2.4
Independent American	James Krochus	5,439	2.3
Majority		12,575	5.4
Total votes		232,724	100.0
Republican hold			

==== Finances ====
===== Campaigns =====
Candidate (party)	Raised	Spent	Cash on hand
Dean Heller (R)	$1,634,942	$1,609,281	$25,658
Jill Derby (D)	$1,610,549	$1,594,051	$16,496
Daniel Rosen (I)	Unreported		
James Krochus (IA)	Unreported		

===== Outside Spending =====
Candidate (party)	Supported	Opposed
Dean Heller (R)	$207,355	$722,582
Jill Derby (D)	$232,280	$481,215
Daniel Rosen (I)	$0	$0
James Krochus (IA)	$0	$0

== District 3 ==
2006 Nevada's 3rd congressional district election
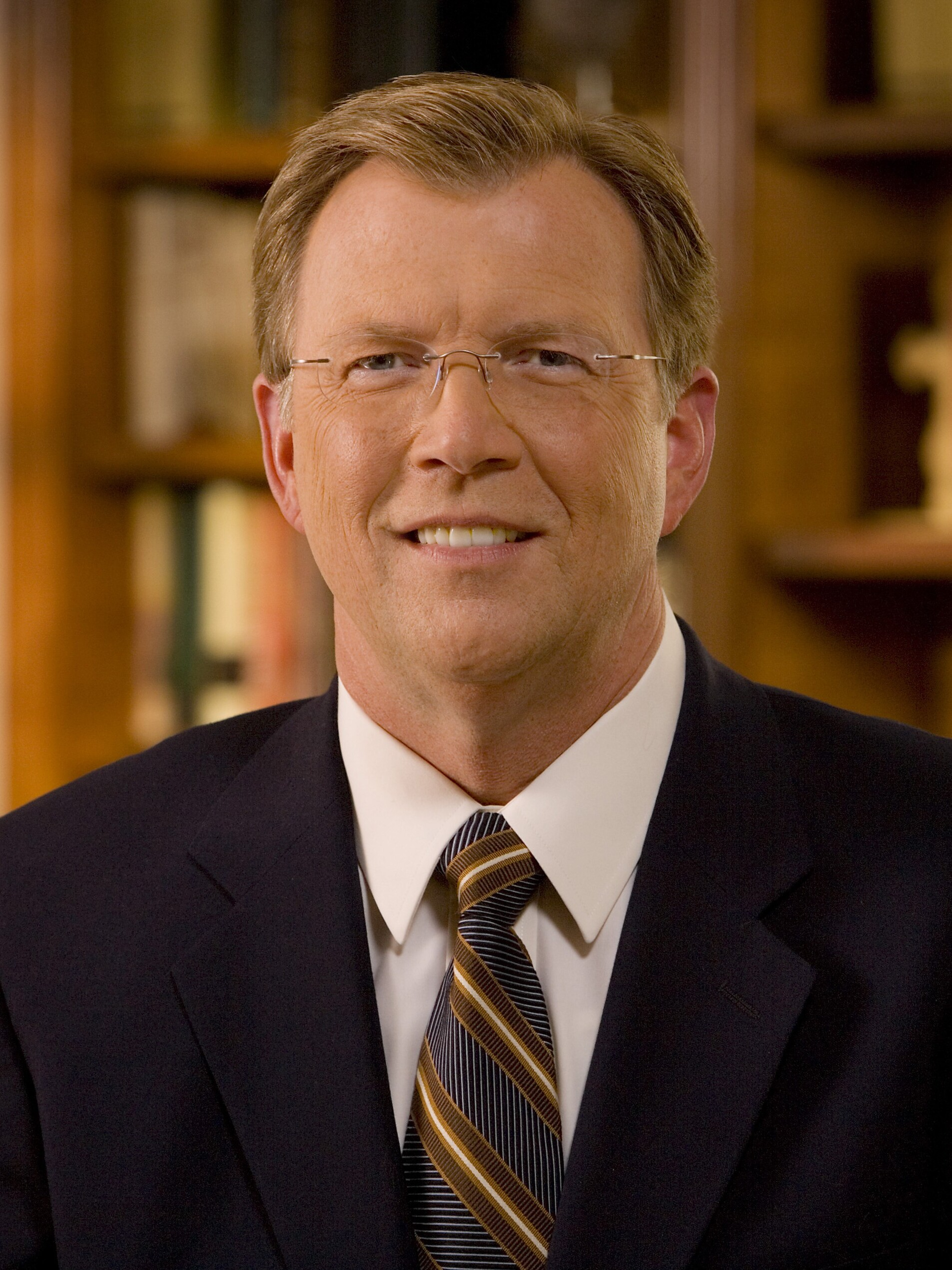

Nominee	Jon Porter	Tessa Hafen
Party	Republican	Democratic
Popular vote	102,232	98,261
Percentage	48.5%	46.6%
- County results Porter: 40–50%
U.S. Representative before election
Jon Porter
Republican
Elected U.S. Representative
Jon Porter
Republican

Incumbent Republican Jon Porter, who had represented the district since 2003, ran for re-election. He was re-elected with 54.5% of the vote in 2004 and the district had a PVI of D+1.

=== Republican primary ===
Porter was a member of the moderate/liberal Republican Main Street Partnership and was a supporter of stem-cell research.

==== Candidates ====
===== Nominee =====
- Jon Porter, incumbent U.S. Representative

=== Democratic primary ===
==== Candidates ====
===== Nominee =====
- Tessa Hafen, former press secretary for US Senate Minority Leader Harry Reid

===== Eliminated in primary =====
- Mark Budetich Jr, Merchant Marine electrician and candidate for this seat in 2002 and 2004
- Barry Michaels, chiropractor
- Anna Nevenic, writer, peace activist and candidate for this seat in 2004
- Freddie Warman

===== Declined =====
- Andre Agassi, professional tennis player

==== Results ====
Democratic primary results
Party	Candidate	Votes	%
Democratic	Tessa Hafen	22,118	57.6
Democratic	Barry Michaels	6,005	15.6
Democratic	Anna Nevenic	4,832	12.6
Democratic	Mark Budetich	3,885	10.1
Democratic	Freddie Warman	1,578	4.1
Total votes		38,418	100.0

=== Libertarian primary ===
==== Candidates ====
===== Nominee =====
- Joseph Silvestri, teacher, realtor and nominee for this seat in 2004

=== Independent American primary ===
==== Candidates ====
===== Nominee =====
- Josh Hansen

=== General election ===
==== Endorsements ====
Tessa Hafen (D)

Organizations

- Democratic Congressional Campaign Committee "Red to Blue" Program

Individuals

- Wesley Clark, retired Army General, 2004 democratic presidential candidate

==== Debate ====
- Complete video of debate, October 19, 2006

==== Polling ====
Poll source	Date(s) administered	Sample size	Margin of error	Jon Porter (R)	Tessa Hafen (D)	Joseph Silvestri (L)	Josh Hansen (IA)	Undecided
Mason-Dixon (Las Vegas Review-Journal)	October 26–30, 2006	400 (RV)	±5.0%	46%	39%	1%	4%	10%
RT Strategies and Constituent Dynamics	October 24–26, 2006	1,031 (LV)	±3.0%	51%	44%	–	–	5%
Mason-Dixon (Las Vegas Review-Journal)	September 19–21, 2006	400 (RV)	±5.0%	47%	37%	1%	2%	13%
RT Strategies and Constituent Dynamics	August 27–29, 2006	1,018 (LV)	±3.1%	51%	43%	–	–	6%

==== Predictions ====
Source	Ranking	As of
The Cook Political Report	Tossup	November 6, 2006
Rothenberg	Tilt R	November 6, 2006
Sabato's Crystal Ball	Tilt R	November 6, 2006
Real Clear Politics	Lean R	November 7, 2006
CQ Politics	Lean R	November 7, 2006

==== Results ====
On election day Porter edged out Hafen by just under 4,000 votes, by far his tightest margin of victory in his congressional career thus far.

Nevada's 3rd congressional district election, 2006
Party	Candidate	Votes	%
Republican	Jon Porter (incumbent)	102,232	48.5
Democratic	Tessa Hafen	98,261	46.6
Independent American	Josh Hansen	5,329	2.5
Libertarian	Joseph Silvestri	5,157	2.4
Majority		3,971	1.9
Total votes		210,979	100.0
Republican hold			

==== Finances ====
===== Campaigns =====
Candidate (party)	Raised	Spent	Cash on hand
Jon Porter (R)	$3,015,397	$3,036,311	$107,933
Tessa Hafen (D)	$1,497,306	$1,501,465	$5,248
Joseph Silvestri (L)	Unreported		
Joshua Hansen (IA)	Unreported		

===== Outside Spending =====
Candidate (party)	Supported	Opposed
Jon Porter (R)	$201,728	$775,260
Tessa Hafen (D)	$761,207	$444,884
Joseph Silvestri (L)	$0	$0
Joshua Hansen (IA)	$0	$0

== Notes ==
Official campaign websites

District 2

- Jill Derby's Congressional campaign site
- Dean Heller's Congressional campaign site
- Daniel Rosen's Congressional campaign site
