= 2004 United States House of Representatives elections in Nevada =

- November 2, 2004

All 3 Nevada seats to the United States House of Representatives
	Majority party	Minority party
Party	Republican	Democratic
Last election	2	1
Seats won	2	1
Seat change	Steady	Steady
Popular vote	420,711	333,912
Percentage	53.16%	42.19%

The 2004 congressional elections in Nevada were elections for Nevada's delegation to the United States House of Representatives, which occurred along with congressional elections nationwide on November 2, 2004. Nevada has three seats, as apportioned during the 2000 United States census. Republicans held two of the seats and Democrats held one.

== Overview ==
=== Statewide ===
Party	Candidates	Votes		Seats		
Party	Candidates	No.	%	No.	+/–	%
Republican	3	420,711	53.16	2	Steady	66.67
Democratic	3	333,912	42.19	1	Steady	33.33
Libertarian	3	20,119	2.54	0	Steady	0.0
Independent American	2	16,691	2.11	0	Steady	0.0
Total	10	791,433	100.0	3	Steady	100.0

Popular vote
Republican	53.16%
Democratic	42.19%
Libertarian	2.54%
Independent American	2.11%

House seats
Republican	66.67%
Democratic	33.33%

=== By district ===
Results of the 2004 United States House of Representatives elections in Nevada by district:

District	Republican		Democratic		Others		Total		Result
District	Votes	%	Votes	%	Votes	%	Votes	%	Result
District 1	63,005	31.12%	133,569	65.98%	5,862	2.90%	202,436	100.0%	Democratic Hold
District 2	195,466	67.15%	79,978	27.48%	15,635	5.37%	291,079	100.0%	Republican Hold
District 3	162,240	54.46%	120,365	40.40%	15,313	5.14%	297,918	100.0%	Republican Hold
Total	420,711	53.16%	333,912	42.19%	36,810	4.65%	791,433	100.0%	

== District 1 ==
2004 Nevada's 1st congressional district election
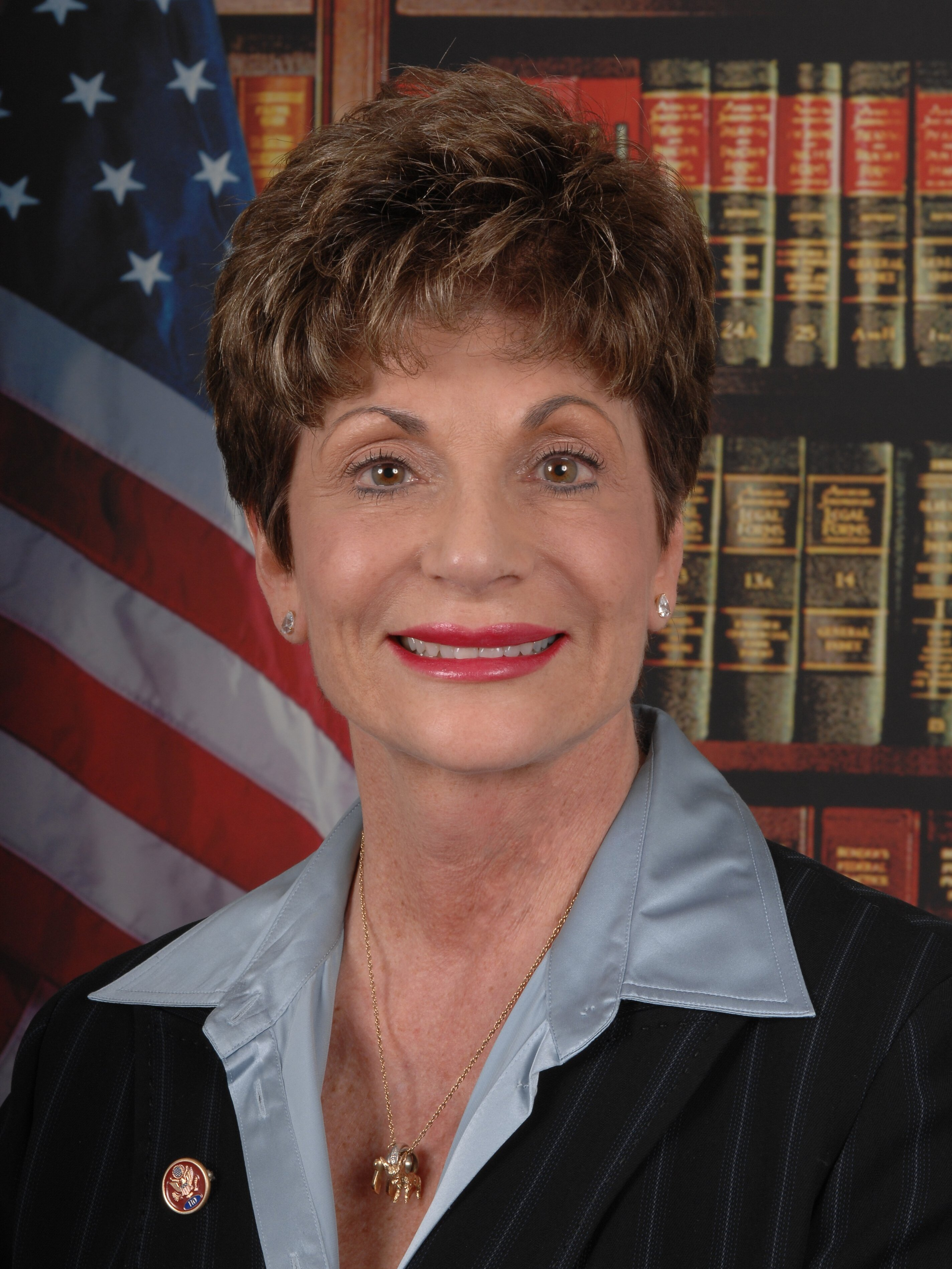

Nominee	Shelley Berkley	Russ Mickelson
Party	Democratic	Republican
Popular vote	133,569	63,005
Percentage	66.0%	31.1%
- County results Berkley: 60–70%
U.S. Representative before election
Shelley Berkley
Democratic
Elected U.S. Representative
Shelley Berkley
Democratic

Incumbent Democrat Shelley Berkley, who had represented the district since 1999, ran for re-election. She was re-elected with 53.7% of the vote in 2002.

=== Democratic primary ===
==== Candidates ====
===== Nominee =====
- Shelley Berkley, incumbent U.S. Representative

===== Eliminated in primary =====
- Brian Kral, playwright and instructor at Community College of Southern Nevada
- Ann Reynolds, bookkeeper and member of the LaRouche movement

==== Results ====
Democratic primary results
Party	Candidate	Votes	%
Democratic	Shelley Berkley	27,765	83.2
Democratic	Ann Reynolds	3,208	9.6
Democratic	Brian Kral	2,412	7.2
Total valid votes		33,385	100.0
Rejected ballots		1,252	3.6
Total ballots		34,637	100.0

=== Republican primary ===
==== Candidates ====
===== Nominee =====
- Russ Mickelson, former Air Force pilot and retired Defense Department employee

===== Eliminated in primary =====
- Lewis Byer, business manager and nominee for Clark County Treasurer in 2002
- Francisco Tamez, chemical technician

==== Results ====
Republican primary results
Party	Candidate	Votes	%
Republican	Russ Mickelson	11,868	63.5
Republican	Lewis Byer	4,806	25.7
Republican	Francisco Tamez	2,026	10.8
Total valid votes		18,700	100.0
Rejected ballots		619	3.2
Total ballots		19,319	100.0

=== Libertarian primary ===
==== Candidates ====
===== Nominee =====
- Jim Duensing, radio talk show host

=== Independent American primary ===
==== Candidates ====
===== Withdrawn =====
- Brad Barnhill

=== General election ===
==== Endorsements ====
Shelley Berkley (D)

Newspapers

- Las Vegas Sun

==== Predictions ====
Source	Ranking	As of
The Cook Political Report	Safe D	October 29, 2004
Sabato's Crystal Ball	Safe D	November 1, 2004

==== Results ====
Nevada's 1st congressional district election, 2004
Party	Candidate	Votes	%
Democratic	Shelley Berkley (incumbent)	133,569	66.0
Republican	Russ Mickelson	63,005	31.1
Libertarian	Jim Duensing	5,862	2.9
Majority		70,564	34.9
Total votes		202,436	100.0
Democratic hold			

==== Finances ====
===== Campaigns =====
Candidate (party)	Raised	Spent	Cash on hand
Shelley Berkley (D)	$1,653,330	$1,248,297	$605,152
Russ Mickelson (R)	$17,982	$17,662	$319
Jim Duensing (L)	Unreported		

===== Outside Spending =====
Candidate (party)	Supported	Opposed
Shelley Berkley (D)	$229	$0
Russ Mickelson (R)	$92	$0
Jim Duensing (L)	$0	$0

== District 2 ==
2004 Nevada's 2nd congressional district election
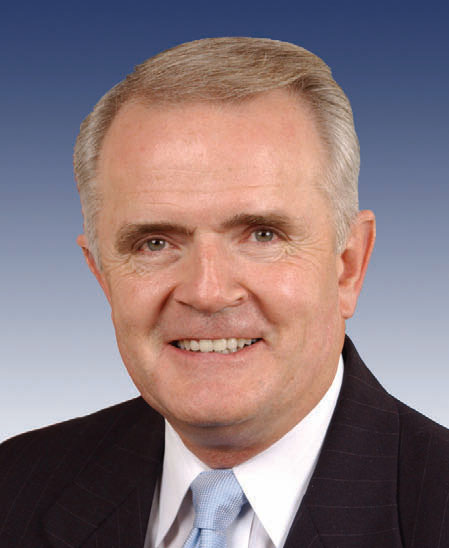

Nominee	Jim Gibbons	Angie Cochran
Party	Republican	Democratic
Popular vote	195,466	79,978
Percentage	67.2%	27.5%
- County results Gibbons: 50–60% 60–70% 70–80% 80–90%
U.S. Representative before election
Jim Gibbons
Republican
Elected U.S. Representative
Jim Gibbons
Republican

Incumbent Republican Jim Gibbons, who had represented the district since 1997, ran for re-election. He was re–elected with 74.3% of the vote in 2002.

=== Republican primary ===
==== Candidates ====
===== Nominee =====
- Jim Gibbons, incumbent U.S. Representative and nominee for Governor in 1994

=== Democratic primary ===
==== Candidates ====
===== Nominee =====
- Angie Cochran, business owner

===== Eliminated in primary =====
- David Bennett, computer systems programmer

==== Results ====
Democratic primary results
Party	Candidate	Votes	%
Democratic	Angie Cochran	18,319	50.6
Democratic	David Bennett	17,859	49.4
Total valid votes		36,178	100.0
Rejected ballots		60	0.2
Total ballots		36,238	100.0

=== Libertarian primary ===
==== Candidates ====
===== Nominee =====
- Brendan Trainor

=== Independent American primary ===
==== Candidates ====
===== Nominee =====
- Janine Hansen

=== General election ===
==== Endorsements ====
Jim Gibbons (R)

Newspapers

- Las Vegas Sun

==== Predictions ====
Source	Ranking	As of
The Cook Political Report	Safe R	October 29, 2004
Sabato's Crystal Ball	Safe R	November 1, 2004

==== Results ====
Nevada's 2nd congressional district election, 2004
Party	Candidate	Votes	%
Republican	Jim Gibbons (incumbent)	195,466	67.2
Democratic	Angie Cochran	79,978	27.5
Independent American	Janine Hansen	10,638	3.7
Libertarian	Brendan Trainor	4,997	1.7
Majority		115,488	39.7
Total votes		291,079	100.0
Republican hold			

==== Finances ====
===== Campaigns =====
Candidate (party)	Raised	Spent	Cash on hand
Jim Gibbons (R)	$1,139,202	$1,171,994	$412,510
Angie Cochran (D)	Unreported		
Brendan Trainor (L)	Unreported		
Janine Hansen (IA)	Unreported		

===== Outside Spending =====
Candidate (party)	Supported	Opposed
Jim Gibbons (R)	$804	$0
Angie Cochran (D)	$0	$0
Brendan Trainor (L)	$0	$0
Janine Hansen (IA)	$0	$0

== District 3 ==
2004 Nevada's 3rd congressional district election
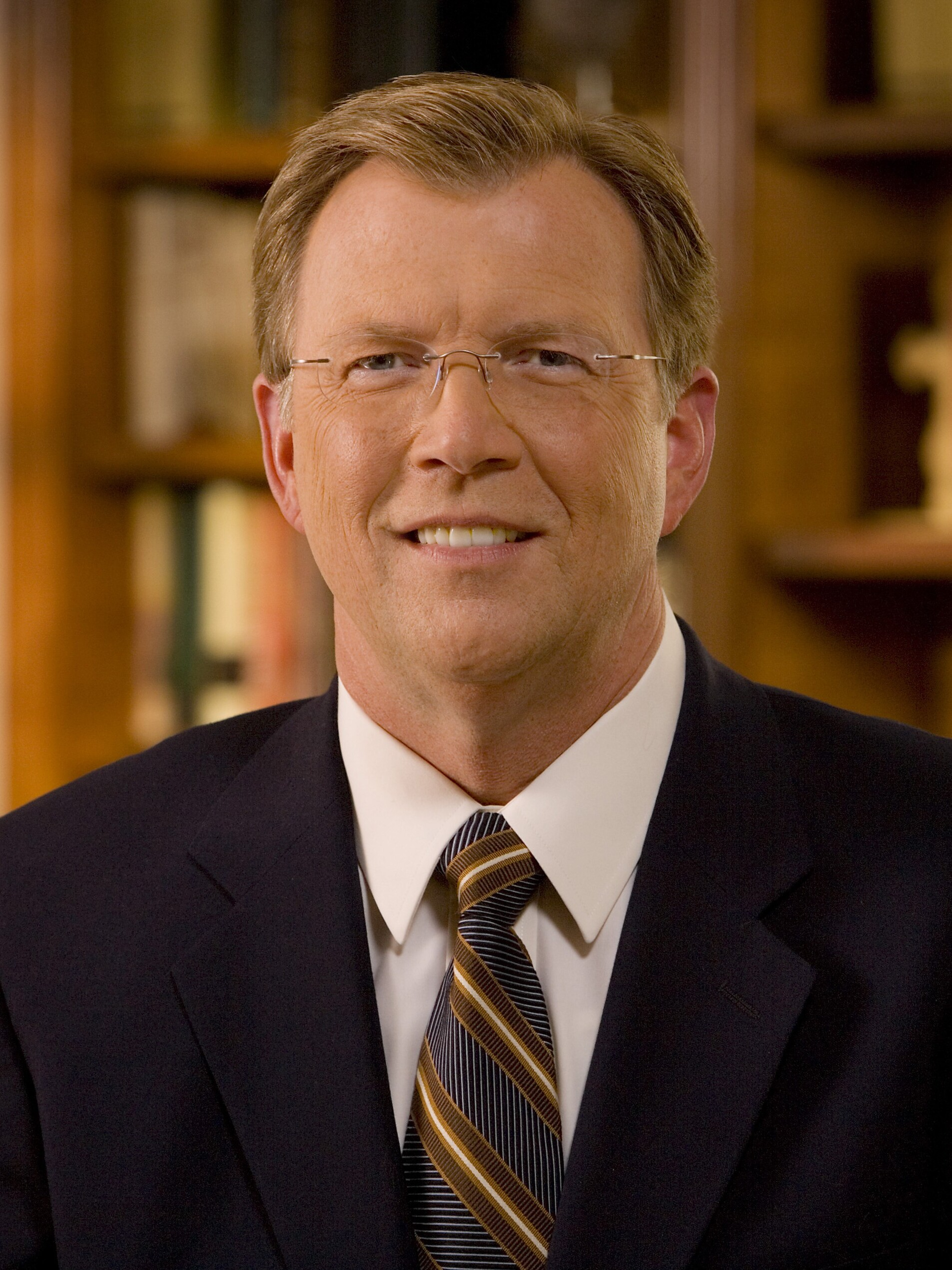

Nominee	Jon Porter	Tom Gallagher
Party	Republican	Democratic
Popular vote	162,240	120,365
Percentage	54.5%	40.4%
- County results Porter: 50–60%
U.S. Representative before election
Jon Porter
Republican
Elected U.S. Representative
Jon Porter
Republican

Incumbent Republican Jon Porter, who had represented the district since 2003, ran for re-election. He was elected with 56.1% of the vote in 2002.

=== Republican primary ===
==== Candidates ====
===== Nominee =====
- Jon Porter, incumbent U.S. Representative

=== Democratic primary ===
==== Candidates ====
===== Nominee =====
- Tom Gallagher, former casino executive

===== Eliminated in primary =====
- Mark Budetich Jr, Merchant Marine electrician and candidate for this seat in 2002
- Rick DeVoe, mechanic
- Anna Nevenic, writer and peace activist
- Shanna Phillips, high school teacher
- Ron Von Felden, lawyer, Vietnam War veteran and host of a daily talk radio show

==== Results ====
Democratic primary results
Party	Candidate	Votes	%
Democratic	Tom Gallagher	23,349	69.5
Democratic	Shanna Phillips	2,573	7.7
Democratic	Anna Nevenic	2,239	6.7
Democratic	Rick DeVoe	2,217	6.6
Democratic	Mark Budetich Jr.	1,833	5.5
Democratic	Ron Von Felden	1,383	4.1
Total valid votes		33,594	100.0
Rejected ballots		850	2.5
Total ballots		34,444	100.0

=== Libertarian primary ===
==== Candidates ====
===== Nominee =====
- Joseph Silvestri, teacher and realtor

=== Independent American primary ===
==== Candidates ====
===== Nominee =====
- Richard Wayne O'Dell, nominee for this seat in 2002

=== Other Candidates ===
- Pete O'Neil (Independent), marketing executive and candidate for this seat in 2002 (Withdrawn)

=== General election ===
==== Campaign ====
Porter was initially seen as vulnerable, given that he was freshman running for re-election in a seat carried by Al Gore 49% to 48% over George W. Bush in 2000 and had befitted from a Democratic candidate hit by ethic issues. In October, Roll Call listed him as one of their 10 most vulnerable incumbents of 2004.

Gallagher pledged not to take any from oil and gas interests and criticized Porter and the Republicans for their ties to the industry, with Porter having received $81,000 from the industry since his first Congressional bid in 2000, saying in a press release "With the generous contributions of big oil and gas to Republicans, it is little wonder that the interests of the energy industry come first while the consumer is stuck with the bill”. Porter however refused saying "My record is very clear in 20 years of service" and his campaign manager described the pledge as a "stunt".

The Porter Campaign were able to paint Gallagher as a carpetbagger who had moved from Lake Tahoe to Henderson to run for Congress. Additionally his decision to lay off service-industry employees during Las Vegas’ post-9/11 slump while collecting a bonus worth millions, cost him support from the Democratic base that he never recovered.

==== Endorsements ====
Tom Gallagher (D)

Organizations

- Democratic Congressional Campaign Committee "Red to Blue" Program

Newspapers

- Las Vegas Sun

==== Debate ====
- Complete video of debate, October 22, 2004

==== Polling ====
Poll source	Date(s) administered	Sample size (Note: Key: A – all adults RV – registered voters LV – likely voters V – unclear)	Margin of error	Jon Porter (R)	Tom Gallagher (D)	Other	Undecided
Mason-Dixon (Las Vegas Review-Journal)	October 26–27, 2004	307 (LV)	±6.0%	51%	41%	1%	7%
Belden Russonello & Stewart (Las Vegas Sun/KLAS-TV/KNPR)	October 16–19, 2004	316 (LV)	±5.5%	49%	32%	2%	17%
Mason-Dixon (Las Vegas Review-Journal)	October 14–16, 2004	300 (LV)	±6.0%	50%	35%	3%	12%
Garin-Hart-Yang Research Group (Gallagher–D)	September 14–15, 2004	405 (LV)	±5.0%	47%	44%	–	9%
Mason-Dixon (Las Vegas Review-Journal)	September 13–15, 2004	300 (LV)	±6.0%	51%	40%	2%	7%
Belden Russonello & Stewart (Las Vegas Sun/KLAS-TV/KNPR)	September 2004	? (LV)	±?%	54%	33%	–	13%
Mason-Dixon (Las Vegas Review-Journal)	July 20–22, 2004	305 (LV)	±6.0%	56%	32%	–	12%
Garin-Hart-Yang Research Group (Gallagher–D)	July 10–12, 2004	400 (LV)	±5.0%	46%	40%	–	14%

==== Predictions ====
Source	Ranking	As of
The Cook Political Report	Lean R	October 29, 2004
Sabato's Crystal Ball	Safe R	November 1, 2004

==== Results ====
Nevada's 3rd congressional district election, 2004
Party	Candidate	Votes	%
Republican	Jon Porter (incumbent)	162,240	54.5
Democratic	Tom Gallagher	120,365	40.4
Libertarian	Joseph Silvestri	9,260	3.1
Independent American	Richard Wayne O'Dell	6,053	2.0
Majority		41,875	14.1
Total votes		297,918	100.0
Republican hold			

==== Finances ====
===== Campaigns =====
Candidate (party)	Raised	Spent	Cash on hand
Jon Porter (R)	$2,762,871	$2,653,136	$128,982
Tom Gallagher (D)	$2,141,750	$2,132,518	$9,231
Joseph Silvestri (L)	Unreported		
Richard O'Dell (IA)	Unreported		

===== Outside Spending =====
Candidate (party)	Supported	Opposed
Jon Porter (R)	$91,320	$223,638
Tom Gallagher (D)	$600,924	$396,971
Joseph Silvestri (L)	$0	$0
ichard O'Dell (IA)	$0	$0
