= Nevada's 1st congressional district =

U.S. House district for Nevada

Coordinates: 36°08′01″N 115°09′05″W

- District boundaries since January 3, 2023
- Representative: Dina Titus; D–Las Vegas
- Distribution: 99.90% urban; 0.10% rural
- Population (2025): 778,553
- Median household income: $74,473
- Ethnicity: 39.6% White; 36.0% Hispanic; 10.0% Black; 7.6% Asian; 5.0% Two or more races; 1.7% other
- Cook PVI: D+2

Nevada's 1st congressional district is a congressional district for the United States House of Representatives in the U.S. state of Nevada. The district covers a portion of Clark County east of Interstate 15 and south of Nellis Air Force Base. It includes parts of the city of Las Vegas and Enterprise, most of Henderson, Paradise, Boulder City, Sunrise Manor, and Winchester as well as all of Boulder City, Whitney and Nelson.

Dina Titus, a Democrat and retired UNLV professor, has served as the district's representative since 2013. From 2008 to 2010, Titus represented part of the same geographic area as Nevada's 3rd district, which was redrawn as part of the 2010 redistricting cycle.

Since it was created in 1982 from an at-large district, the only Republican to represent the 1st district has been John Ensign for two terms from 1995 until 1999.

Since the 2020 census resulted in redistricting, the district has been considered competitive due to demographic changes and the overall political climate. However, Democrats have held the seat since. As of February 2025, the 2026 Cook Political Report analysis of House races across the country classified the 1st district as competitive with Democrats having a two point advantage over Republicans.

== History ==
Before the 1980 census, Nevada was represented by a single at-large congressional district. As a result of the 1980 redistricting cycle, Nevada was split into two districts.

From 1983 to 1993, the 1st district included most of Clark County. From 1993 to 2003, it covered the county's center, the Las Vegas Valley, while rest of the county and state and were in the 2nd district.

The 2000 census showed further population growth, and the redistricting cycle created Nevada's 3rd congressional district, which included most of Henderson, North Las Vegas, Summerlin, and much of unincorporated Clark County.

The 2010 census and its redistricting cycle gave Nevada its 4th congressional district, further condensing the 1st district towards the urban core of Las Vegas.

The 2020 census and its redistricting cycle moved Henderson, the second largest city in Nevada, from the 3rd to the 1st district.

== Composition ==
For the 118th and successive Congresses (based on redistricting following the 2020 census), the district contains all or portions of the following counties and communities:

Clark County (10)

Boulder City, Enterprise (part; also 3rd), Henderson (part; also 4th), Las Vegas (part; also 3rd and 4th), Nelson, North Las Vegas (part; also 4th), Paradise (part; also 3rd), Sunrise Manor (part; also 4th), Whitney, Winchester (part; also 3rd)

== Recent election results from statewide races ==
Year	Office	Results
2008	President	Obama 58%—40%
2010	Senate	Reid 57%—43%
2010	Governor	Sandoval 51%—49%
2010	Secretary of State	Miller 62%—38%
2010	Treasurer	Marshall 56%—44%
2012	President	Obama 57%—43%
2016	President	Clinton 52%—42%
2016	Senate	Cortez Masto 51%—41%
2018	Senate	Rosen 54%—41%
2018	Governor	Sisolak 53%—41%
2018	Lt. Governor	Marshall 53%—41%
2018	Secretary of State	Araujo 52%—45%
2018	Treasurer	Conine 52%—43%
2018	Attorney General	Ford 51%—43%
2020	President	Biden 53%—45%
2022	Senate	Cortez Masto 52%—45%
2022	Governor	Sisolak 51%—46%
2022	Lt. Governor	Cano Burkhead 49%—46%
2022	Secretary of State	Aguilar 52%—44%
2022	Treasurer	Conine 51%—43%
2022	Controller	Spiegel 50%—46%
2022	Attorney General	Ford 55%—42%
2024	President	Harris 50%—48%
2024	Senate	Rosen 50%—43%

== List of members representing the district ==
Member (Residency)	Party	Years	Cong ress	Electoral history	District location
District established January 3, 1983
Harry Reid (Las Vegas)	Democratic	January 3, 1983 – January 3, 1987	98th 99th	Elected in 1982. Re-elected in 1984. Retired to run for U.S. Senate.	1983–1993; Part of Clark County
James Bilbray (Las Vegas)	Democratic	January 3, 1987 – January 3, 1995	100th 101st 102nd 103rd	Elected in 1986. Re-elected in 1988. Re-elected in 1990. Re-elected in 1992. Lost re-election.	1983–1993; Part of Clark County
James Bilbray (Las Vegas)	Democratic	January 3, 1987 – January 3, 1995	100th 101st 102nd 103rd	Elected in 1986. Re-elected in 1988. Re-elected in 1990. Re-elected in 1992. Lost re-election.	1993–2003; Part of Clark County
John Ensign (Las Vegas)	Republican	January 3, 1995 – January 3, 1999	104th 105th	Elected in 1994. Re-elected in 1996. Retired to run for U.S. Senate.	1993–2003; Part of Clark County
Shelley Berkley (Las Vegas)	Democratic	January 3, 1999 – January 3, 2013	106th 107th 108th 109th 110th 111th 112th	Elected in 1998. Re-elected in 2000. Re-elected in 2002. Re-elected in 2004. Re-elected in 2006. Re-elected in 2008. Re-elected in 2010. Retired to run for U.S. Senate.	1993–2003; Part of Clark County
Shelley Berkley (Las Vegas)	Democratic	January 3, 1999 – January 3, 2013	106th 107th 108th 109th 110th 111th 112th	Elected in 1998. Re-elected in 2000. Re-elected in 2002. Re-elected in 2004. Re-elected in 2006. Re-elected in 2008. Re-elected in 2010. Retired to run for U.S. Senate.	2003–2013 Part of Clark county
Dina Titus (Las Vegas)	Democratic	January 3, 2013 – present	113th 114th 115th 116th 117th 118th 119th	Elected in 2012. Re-elected in 2014. Re-elected in 2016. Re-elected in 2018. Re-elected in 2020. Re-elected in 2022. Re-elected in 2024. Re-elected in 2026.	2013–2023 Part of Clark
Dina Titus (Las Vegas)	Democratic	January 3, 2013 – present	113th 114th 115th 116th 117th 118th 119th	Elected in 2012. Re-elected in 2014. Re-elected in 2016. Re-elected in 2018. Re-elected in 2020. Re-elected in 2022. Re-elected in 2024. Re-elected in 2026.	2023–present Part of Clark

== Election results ==
=== 1982–1992 ===
==== 1982 ====
1982 election results, Nevada's 1st congressional district
Party	Candidate	Votes	%
Democratic	Harry Reid	61,901	57.54
Republican	Peggy Cavnar	45,675	42.46
Total votes		107,576	100.0
Democratic win (new seat)			

==== 1984 ====
1984 election results, Nevada's 1st congressional district
Party	Candidate	Votes	%
Democratic	Harry Reid (Incumbent)	73,242	56.12
Republican	Peggy Cavnar	55,391	42.44
Libertarian	Joe Morris	1,885	1.44
Total votes		130,518	100.0
Democratic hold			

==== 1986 ====
1986 election results, Nevada's 1st congressional district
Party	Candidate	Votes	%
Democratic	James Bilbray	61,830	54.09
Republican	Bob Ryan	59,433	44.04
Libertarian	Gordon Michael Morris	2,145	1.88
Total votes		114,317	100.0
Democratic hold			

==== 1988 ====
1988 election results, Nevada's 1st congressional district
Party	Candidate	Votes	%
Democratic	James Bilbray (Incumbent)	101,764	63.97
Republican	Lucille Lusk	53,588	33.69
Libertarian	Patrick O'Neill	3,724	2.34
Total votes		159,076	100.0
Democratic hold			

==== 1990 ====
1990 election results, Nevada's 1st congressional district
Party	Candidate	Votes	%
Democratic	James Bilbray (Incumbent)	84,650	61.41
Republican	Bob Dickinson	47,377	34.37
Libertarian	William Moore	5,825	4.23
Total votes		137,852	100.0
Democratic hold			

=== 1992–2002 ===
==== 1992 ====
1992 election results, Nevada's 1st congressional district
Party	Candidate	Votes	%
Democratic	James Bilbray (Incumbent)	128,178	57.87
Republican	J. Coy Pettyjohn	84,217	38.02
Libertarian	Scott A. Kjar	8,993	4.06
Total votes		221,488	100.0
Democratic win (new boundaries)			

==== 1994 ====
1994 election results, Nevada's 1st congressional district
Party	Candidate	Votes	%
Republican	John Ensign	73,769	48.48
Democratic	James Bilbray (Incumbent)	72,333	47.54
Libertarian	Gary Wood	6,065	3.99
Total votes		152,167	100.0
Republican gain from Democratic			

==== 1996 ====
1996 election results, Nevada's 1st congressional district
Party	Candidate	Votes	%
Republican	John Ensign (Incumbent)	86,472	50.10
Democratic	Bob Coffin	75,081	43.50
Independent American	Ted Gunderson	4,572	2.65
Libertarian	James Dan	3,341	1.94
Natural Law	Richard Eidson	3,127	1.81
Total votes		172,593	100.0
Republican hold			

==== 1998 ====
1998 election results, Nevada's 1st congressional district
Party	Candidate	Votes	%
Democratic	Shelley Berkley	79,315	49.24
Republican	Don Chairez	73,540	45.65
Libertarian	Jim Burns	5,292	3.29
Independent American	Jess Howe	2,935	1.82
Total votes		161,082	100.0
Democratic gain from Republican			

==== 2000 ====
2000 election results, Nevada's 1st congressional district
Party	Candidate	Votes	%
Democratic	Shelley Berkley (Incumbent)	118,469	51.68
Republican	Jon Porter	101,276	44.18
Libertarian	Charles Schneider	4,011	1.75
Independent American	Christopher H. Hansen	3,933	1.72
Citizens First	W.G. Swenson	1,546	0.67
Total votes		229,235	100.0
Democratic hold			

=== 2002–2012 ===
==== 2002 ====
2002 election results, Nevada's 1st congressional district
Party	Candidate	Votes	%
Democratic	Shelley Berkley (Incumbent)	64,312	53.72
Republican	Lynette Boggs-McDonald	51,148	42.73
Independent American	Steven Dempsey	2,861	2.39
Green	W. Lane Startin	1,393	1.16
Total votes		119,714	100.0
Democratic win (new boundaries)			

==== 2004 ====
2004 election results, Nevada's 1st congressional district
Party	Candidate	Votes	%
Democratic	Shelley Berkley (Incumbent)	133,569	65.98
Republican	Russ Mickelson	63,005	31.12
Libertarian	Jim Duensing	5,862	2.90
Total votes		202,436	100.0
Democratic hold			

==== 2006 ====
2006 election results, Nevada's 1st congressional district
Party	Candidate	Votes	%
Democratic	Shelley Berkley (Incumbent)	85,025	64.84
Republican	Kenneth Wegner	40,917	31.20
Libertarian	Jim Duensing	2,843	2.17
Independent American	Darnell Roberts	2,339	1.78
Total votes		131,124	100.0
Democratic hold			

==== 2008 ====
2008 election results, Nevada's 1st congressional district
Party	Candidate	Votes	%
Democratic	Shelley Berkley (Incumbent)	154,860	67.65
Republican	Kenneth Wegner	64,837	28.32
Independent American	Caren Alexander	4,697	2.05
Libertarian	Jim Duensing	4,528	1.98
Total votes		228,922	100.0
Democratic hold			

==== 2010 ====
2010 election results, Nevada's 1st congressional district
Party	Candidate	Votes	%
Democratic	Shelley Berkley (Incumbent)	103,246	61.75
Republican	Kenneth Wegner	58,995	35.28
Independent American	Jonathan J. Hansen	2,847	1.70
Libertarian	Ed Klapproth	2,118	1.27
Total votes		167,306	100.0
Democratic hold			

=== 2012–2022 ===
==== 2012 ====
2012 election results, Nevada's 1st congressional district
Party	Candidate	Votes	%
Democratic	Dina Titus	113,967	63.57
Republican	Chris Edwards	56,521	31.53
Independent American	Stan Vaughan	4,145	2.31
Libertarian	William "Bill" Pojunis	4,645	2.59
Total votes		179,278	100.0
Democratic win (new boundaries)			

==== 2014 ====
2014 election results, Nevada's 1st congressional district
Party	Candidate	Votes	%
Democratic	Dina Titus (Incumbent)	45,643	56.84
Republican	Annette Teijeiro	30,413	37.87
Libertarian	Richard Charles	2,617	3.26
Independent American	Kamau Bakari	1,626	2.03
Total votes		80,299	100.0
Democratic hold			

==== 2016 ====
2016 election results, Nevada's 1st congressional district
Party	Candidate	Votes	%
Democratic	Dina Titus (Incumbent)	116,537	61.87
Republican	Mary Perry	54,174	28.76
Independent	Reuben D'Silva	13,897	7.38
Independent American	Kamau Bakari	3,744	1.99
Total votes		188,352	100.00
Democratic hold			

==== 2018 ====
2018 election results, Nevada's 1st congressional district
Party	Candidate	Votes	%	±%
Democratic	Dina Titus (Incumbent)	100,674	66.16	+4.29
Republican	Joyce Bentley	46,969	30.87	+2.11
Independent American	Dan Garfield	2,453	1.61	– 0.38
Libertarian	Robert Van Strawder Jr.	2,061	1.36	N/a
Margin of victory		53,705	35.29	+2.18
Total votes		152,157	100.0	
Democratic hold		Swing		

==== 2020 ====
2020 election results, Nevada's 1st congressional district
Party	Candidate	Votes	%
Democratic	Dina Titus (incumbent)	137,868	61.8
Republican	Joyce Bentley	74,490	33.4
Independent American	Kamau Bakari	6,190	2.8
Libertarian	Robert Van Strawder	4,665	2.1
Total votes		223,213	100.0
Democratic hold			

=== 2022–2032 ===
==== 2022 ====
2022 election results, Nevada's 1st congressional district
Party	Candidate	Votes	%
Democratic	Dina Titus (incumbent)	115,700	51.6
Republican	Mark Robertson	103,115	46.0
Libertarian	Ken Cavanaugh	5,534	2.5
Total votes		224,349	100.0
Democratic win (new boundaries)			

==== 2024 ====
2024 election results, Nevada's 1st congressional district
Party	Candidate	Votes	%
Democratic	Dina Titus (incumbent)	167,885	52.0
Republican	Mark Robertson	143,650	44.5
Independent	Ron Quince	3,321	1.0
Independent American	William Hoge	2,736	0.9
Libertarian	David Havlicek	2,711	0.8
Independent	David Goossen	2,596	0.8
Total votes		322,899	100.0
Democratic hold			

== See also ==
- Nevada's congressional districts
- List of United States congressional districts
