= Nevada's 3rd congressional district =

U.S. House district in southern Nevada

Coordinates: 35°39′48″N 115°09′15″W

- Interactive map of district boundaries since January 3, 2023
- Representative: Susie Lee; D–Las Vegas
- Population (2025): 831,679
- Median household income: $92,323
- Ethnicity: 43.9% White; 21.2% Hispanic; 17.1% Asian; 9.7% Black; 6.1% Two or more races; 1.0% Pacific Islander Americans; 0.9% other
- Cook PVI: D+1

Nevada's 3rd congressional district is a congressional district occupying southern Las Vegas and much of unincorporated Clark County. The district was initially created after the 2000 census.

This district was redrawn after the census during the 33rd (2021) special session of the Nevada Legislature on November 16, 2021. It is currently represented by Democrat Susie Lee.

The district was one of 13 congressional districts that voted for Donald Trump in the 2024 presidential election while simultaneously electing a Democrat in the 2024 House of Representatives elections.

== Recent election results from statewide races ==
Year	Office	Results
2008	President	Obama 56% - 42%
2010	Senate	Reid 54% - 46%
2010	Governor	Sandoval 54% - 46%
2010	Secretary of State	Miller 60% - 40%
2010	Treasurer	Marshall 53% - 47%
2012	President	Obama 54% - 46%
2016	President	Clinton 51% - 44%
2016	Senate	Cortez Masto 49% - 43%
2018	Senate	Rosen 54% - 42%
2018	Governor	Sisolak 53% - 42%
2018	Lt. Governor	Marshall 53% - 42%
2018	Secretary of State	Araujo 51% - 47%
2018	Treasurer	Conine 51% - 45%
2018	Attorney General	Ford 51% - 44%
2020	President	Biden 52% - 46%
2022	Senate	Cortez Masto 52% - 46%
2022	Governor	Sisolak 50% - 47%
2022	Lt. Governor	Cano Burkhead 49% - 47%
2022	Secretary of State	Aguilar 52% - 45%
2022	Treasurer	Conine 51% - 43%
2022	Controller	Spiegel 49% - 47%
2022	Attorney General	Ford 54% - 43%
2024	President	Trump 50% - 49%
2024	Senate	Rosen 49% - 45%

== Composition ==
For the 118th and successive Congresses (based on redistricting following the 2020 census), the district contains all or portions of the following counties and communities:

Clark County (12)

Blue Diamond, Cal-Nev-Ari, Enterprise (part; also 1st), Goodsprings, Las Vegas (part; also 1st and 4th), Laughlin, Paradise (part; also 1st), Sandy Valley, Searchlight, Spring Valley, Summerlin South, Winchester (part; also 1st)

== List of members representing the district ==
Member (Residency)	Party	Years	Cong ress	Electoral history	District location
District established January 3, 2003
Jon Porter (Henderson)	Republican	January 3, 2003 – January 3, 2009	108th 109th 110th	Elected in 2002. Re-elected in 2004. Re-elected in 2006. Lost re-election.	2003–2013 Part of Clark
Dina Titus (Las Vegas)	Democratic	January 3, 2009 – January 3, 2011	111th	Elected in 2008. Lost re-election.	2003–2013 Part of Clark
Joe Heck (Henderson)	Republican	January 3, 2011 – January 3, 2017	112th 113th 114th	Elected in 2010. Re-elected in 2012. Re-elected in 2014. Retired to run for U.S. senator.	2003–2013 Part of Clark
Joe Heck (Henderson)	Republican	January 3, 2011 – January 3, 2017	112th 113th 114th	Elected in 2010. Re-elected in 2012. Re-elected in 2014. Retired to run for U.S. senator.	2013–2023 Part of Clark
Jacky Rosen (Henderson)	Democratic	January 3, 2017 – January 3, 2019	115th	Elected in 2016. Retired to run for U.S. senator.	2013–2023 Part of Clark
Susie Lee (Las Vegas)	Democratic	January 3, 2019 – present	116th 117th 118th 119th	Elected in 2018. Re-elected in 2020. Re-elected in 2022. Re-elected in 2024. Re-elected in 2026.	2013–2023 Part of Clark
Susie Lee (Las Vegas)	Democratic	January 3, 2019 – present	116th 117th 118th 119th	Elected in 2018. Re-elected in 2020. Re-elected in 2022. Re-elected in 2024. Re-elected in 2026.	2023–present Part of Clark

== Election results ==
=== 2002 ===
2002 Nevada's 3rd congressional district election
Party	Candidate	Votes	%
Republican	Jon Porter	100,378	56.08
Democratic	Dario Herrera	66,659	37.24
Independent	Pete O'Neil	6,842	3.82
Libertarian	Neil Scott	3,421	1.91
Independent American	Richard Wayne O'Dell	1,694	0.95
Total votes		178,994	100.0
Republican win (new seat)			

=== 2004 ===
2004 Nevada's 3rd congressional district election
Party	Candidate	Votes	%
Republican	Jon Porter (Incumbent)	162,240	54.46
Democratic	Tom Gallagher	120,365	40.40
Libertarian	Joseph P. Silvestri	9,260	3.11
Independent American	Richard Wayne O'Dell	6,053	2.03
Total votes		297,918	100.0
Republican hold			

=== 2006 ===
2006 Nevada's 3rd congressional district election
Party	Candidate	Votes	%
Republican	Jon Porter (Incumbent)	102,232	48.46
Democratic	Tessa Hafen	98,261	46.57
Independent American	Joshua Hansen	5,329	2.53
Libertarian	Joseph P. Silvestri	5,157	2.44
Total votes		210,979	100.0
Republican hold			

=== 2008 ===
2008 Nevada's 3rd congressional district election
Party	Candidate	Votes	%
Democratic	Dina Titus	165,912	47.43
Republican	Jon Porter (Incumbent)	147,940	42.29
Independent	Jeffrey C. Reeves	14,922	4.27
Libertarian	Joseph P. Silvestri	10,164	2.91
Independent American	Floyd Fitzgibbons	6,937	1.98
Green	Bob Giaquinta	3,937	1.13
Total votes		349,812	100.0
Democratic gain from Republican			

=== 2010 ===
2010 Nevada's 3rd congressional district election
Party	Candidate	Votes	%
Republican	Joe Heck	128,916	48.13
Democratic	Dina Titus (Incumbent)	127,168	47.47
Independent	Barry Michaels	6,473	2.42
Libertarian	Joseph P. Silvestri	4,026	1.50
Independent American	Scott David Narter	1,291	0.48
Total votes		267,874	100.0
Republican gain from Democratic			

=== 2012 ===
2012 Nevada's 3rd congressional district election
Party	Candidate	Votes	%
Republican	Joe Heck (Incumbent)	137,244	50.36
Democratic	John Oceguera	116,823	42.87
Independent American	Jim Murphy	12,856	4.72
Independent American	Tom Jones	5,600	2.05
Total votes		272,523	100.0
Republican hold			

=== 2014 ===
2014 Nevada's 3rd congressional district election
Party	Candidate	Votes	%
Republican	Joe Heck (Incumbent)	88,528	60.75
Democratic	Erin Bilbray	52,644	36.13
Independent	David Goossen	1,637	1.12
Libertarian	Randy Kimmick	1,566	1.08
Independent	Steven St. John	1,344	0.92
Total votes		145,719	100
Republican hold			

=== 2016 ===
2016 Nevada's 3rd congressional district election
Party	Candidate	Votes	%
Democratic	Jacklyn Rosen	146,653	47.23
Republican	Danny Tarkanian	142,726	45.97
Independent American	Warren Markowitz	11,580	3.73
Independent	David Goossen	9,551	3.08
Total votes		310,510	100
Democratic gain from Republican			

=== 2018 ===
2018 Nevada's 3rd congressional district election
Party	Candidate	Votes	%	±%
Democratic	Susie Lee	148,474	51.89	+4.66%
Republican	Danny Tarkanian	122,551	42.83	−3.13%
Libertarian	Steve Brown	4,554	1.59	N/A
Independent	David Goossen	3,627	1.27	−1.81%
Independent American	Harry Vickers	3,481	1.22	−2.51%
Independent	Gil Eisner	1,887	0.66	N/A
Independent	Tony Gumina	1,551	0.54	N/A
Margin of victory		25,923	9.06	+7.79%
Total votes		286,125	100.0	N/A
Democratic hold				

=== 2020 ===
2020 Nevada's 3rd congressional district election
Party	Candidate	Votes	%
Democratic	Susie Lee (Incumbent)	203,421	48.8
Republican	Dan Rodimer	190,975	45.8
Libertarian	Steve Brown	12,315	2.9
Independent	Edward Bridges III	10,541	2.5
Total votes		417,252	100
Democratic hold			

=== 2022 ===
2022 Nevada's 3rd congressional district election
Party	Candidate	Votes	%
Democratic	Susie Lee (incumbent)	131,086	52.0
Republican	April Becker	121,083	48.0
Total votes		252,169	100
Democratic hold			

=== 2024 ===
2024 Nevada's 3rd congressional district election
Party	Candidate	Votes	%
Democratic	Susie Lee (incumbent)	191,304	51.4
Republican	Drew Johnson	181,084	48.6
Total votes		372,388	100.0
Democratic hold			

== See also ==
- Nevada's congressional districts
- List of United States congressional districts
