= Nevada's congressional districts =

U.S. House districts in the state of Nevada

Map of Nevada's congressional districts since 2023 Interactive map version

Nevada is divided into four congressional districts, each represented by a member of the United States House of Representatives. After the 2010 census, Nevada gained a fourth House seat.

== Current districts and representatives ==
This is a list of United States representatives from Nevada, district boundaries, and the district political ratings according to the CPVI. In the 118th United States Congress, the delegation has four members, with three Democrats and one Republican.

Current U.S. representatives from Nevada
District	Member (Residence)	Party	Incumbent since	CPVI (2025)	District map
1st	Dina Titus (Las Vegas)	Democratic	January 3, 2013	D+2	
2nd	Mark Amodei (Carson City)	Republican	September 13, 2011	R+7	
3rd	Susie Lee (Las Vegas)	Democratic	January 3, 2019	D+1	
4th	Steven Horsford (Las Vegas)	Democratic	January 3, 2019	D+2	

== Historical and present district boundaries ==
Table of United States congressional district boundary maps in the State of Nevada, presented chronologically. All redistricting events that took place in Nevada between 1983 and 2013 are shown.

Year	Statewide map	Las Vegas highlight
1983–1992		
1993–2002		
2003–2013		
2013–2023		

== Obsolete districts ==
- Nevada Territory's at-large congressional district
- Nevada's at-large congressional district

== See also ==
- List of United States congressional districts
- Nevada's congressional delegations
