= Jon Porter =

American politician (born 1955)

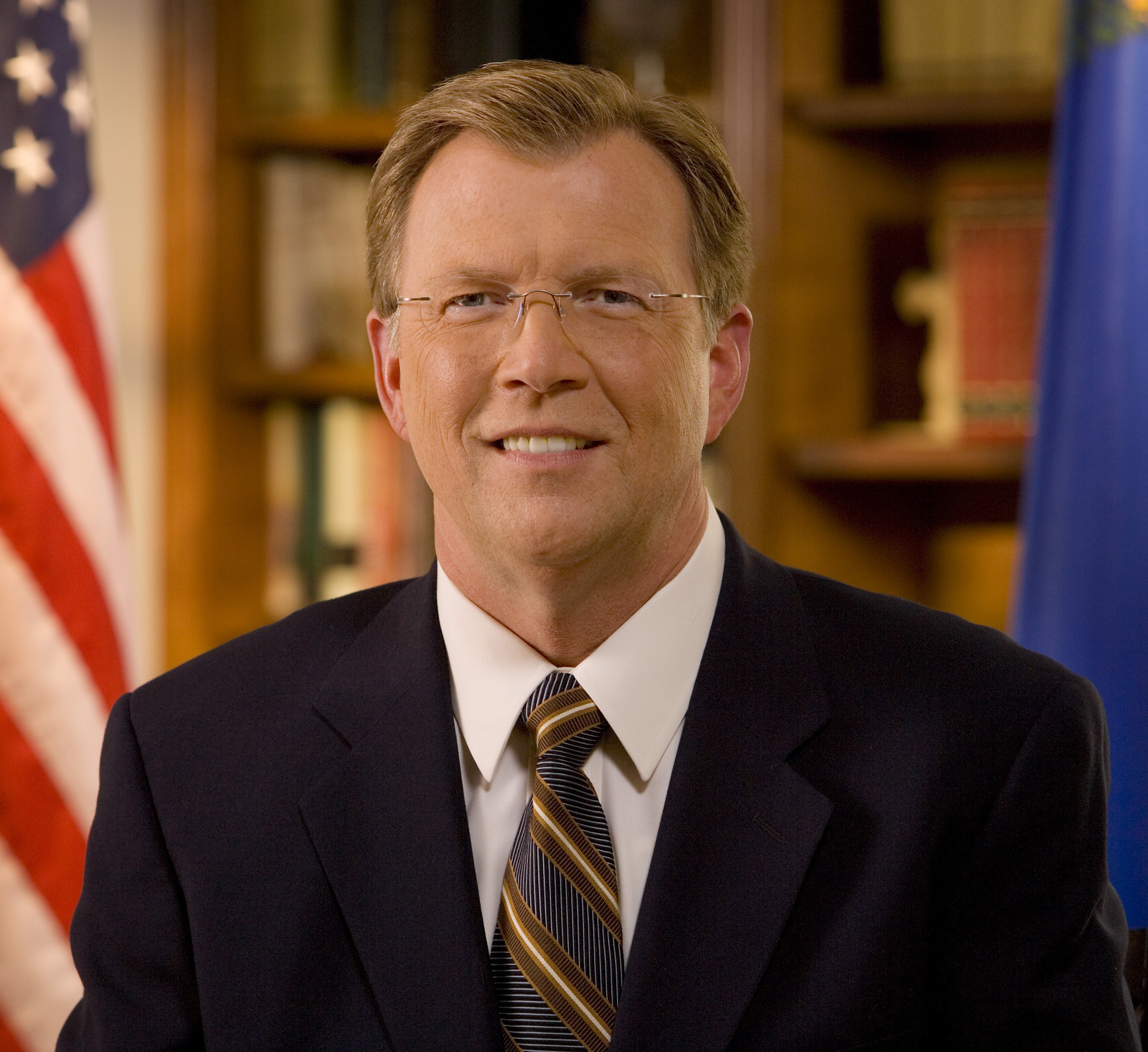

Member of the U.S. House of Representatives from Nevada's 3rd district
- In office January 3, 2003 – January 3, 2009
- Preceded by: Constituency established
- Succeeded by: Dina Titus

Member of the Nevada Senate from the 1st district
- In office November 1994 – July 2002
- Preceded by: Hal Smith
- Succeeded by: Christine Milburn

Personal details
- Born: May 16, 1955 (age 71) Fort Dodge, Iowa, U.S.
- Party: Republican
- Spouse: Kristin McMillan
- Education: Briar Cliff University

Jonathan Christopher Porter (born May 16, 1955) is an American politician who served as a Republican member of the United States House of Representatives, the first representative elected from the 3rd congressional district of Nevada.

He won re-election in the 2006 midterm election against Tessa Hafen by a 48%–47% margin. On November 4, 2008, after three consecutive terms, he was defeated by Nevada State Senator Dina Titus, a Democrat and professor at the University of Nevada, Las Vegas.

== Early life, education, and early political career ==
Porter was born in Fort Dodge, Iowa, and graduated from Humboldt High School in Humboldt, Iowa. He attended Briar Cliff College and worked in his family business for several years before moving to Boulder City, Nevada, a suburb of Las Vegas.

He began his political career in 1983 when he was elected to the Boulder City Council. That year he also became an agent for Farmers Insurance. Porter was elected mayor of Boulder City in 1987 and served in that capacity until 1991. He served in the Nevada Senate from 1994 until 2002.

== U.S. House of Representatives ==
In December, 2005, he joined with several other congressmen to form the Second Amendments, a bipartisan rock and country band set to play for United States troops stationed overseas over the holiday season.

=== Elections ===
2000

Porter lost the race for U.S. Congress in Nevada's 1st congressional district against Democratic incumbent Shelley Berkley. Berkley won 52% to 44%.

2002

However, this immediately made him the frontrunner for the Republican nomination in the newly created 3rd District. The district had been created due to a population explosion in the Las Vegas area. Porter easily won the Republican nomination and faced Clark County Commissioner Dario Herrera. The race was considered one of the hottest in the nation, in part because the district had been created as a "fair fight" district. However, Herrera's campaign foundered due to ethical problems, most notably when he was paid $50,000 by the Las Vegas Housing Authority for "public relations work." Porter won 56% to 37%.

2004

Porter defeated Tom Gallagher by a wider-than-expected 14-point margin (54% to 40%).

2006

Porter won re-election over his opponent Tessa Hafen, former press secretary for U.S. Senator Harry Reid, with 48% to 47%.

2008

The closeness of the 2006 race, combined with the marginal nature of the district, led Democrats to target Porter for defeat in 2008. After their initial choice, Clark County District Attorney Robert Daskas, dropped out for family reasons, the Democrats quickly recruited State Senate Minority Leader Dina Titus, the unsuccessful Democratic candidate for governor in 2006. In the November 2008 election, Porter lost only the second general election of his career, taking 42 percent of the vote to Titus' 47 percent. Porter was likely hampered by a sharp increase in Democratic registration, as well as Barack Obama carrying the district with 55 percent of the vote. Additionally, Porter was seen as a potentially strong challenger to Harry Reid, the Democratic Majority Leader of the U.S. Senate who was up for reelection in 2010, so it was thought that Reid targeted Porter for defeat in order to eliminate him as a possible opponent.

=== Committee assignments ===
Porter was a member of the Ways and Means Committee and the Budget Committee.

== Voting record ==
=== War in Iraq ===
Porter supported the 2003 Invasion of Iraq and called for a quick end to the invasion. He supported the Iraq War troop surge of 2007. On July 12, 2007, Porter said he will not reconsider his stance on the Iraq war until September 2007 when General Petraeus presented a report on the efficacy of the Iraq troop surge. On August 29, 2007, Porter claimed that U.S. withdrawal from Iraq would lead to $9 per gallon gasoline.

=== Energy and oil ===
Jon Porter voted against tax incentives for renewable energy, tax incentives for bio fuels, and removing oil & gas exploration subsidies. He had a 0% rating on energy independence from the Campaign for America's Future, a progressive political organization, and voted twice to implement George W. Bush's national energy policy.

=== Social Security ===
Porter supported limited, partial privatization of Social Security.

=== Equal pay ===
Porter voted against the Lilly Ledbetter Fair Pay Act. This legislation would have overturned the Supreme Court decision in Ledbetter v. Goodyear Tire & Rubber Co. by changing the computation of the statute of limitations to make it easier to file a lawsuit for violating equal pay laws.

=== Social issues ===
On July 19, 2007, Porter voted for an amendment that would have cut off funding for Planned Parenthood and other groups which provide abortion services. In September 2004, Porter voted to amend the United States Constitution to ban same-sex marriage.

=== Labor ===
In January 2007, Jon Porter voted against raising the federal minimum wage to $7.25. In March 2007, Porter voted against restricting employer influences in union organizing. The AFL–CIO considered Porter to have an anti-union voting record.

=== Civil rights ===
The NAACP agreed with 39% of his votes on their key issues, and describe his record as 'mixed'. In December 2005, Jon Porter voted to make the PATRIOT Act permanent.

=== Illegal immigration ===
Porter opposed requiring hospitals to notify immigration authorities of illegal immigrants seeking treatment.

== Post-congressional career ==
=== Lobbying ===
Since 2008, Porter leads Porter Group, a political lobbying and business consulting firm in Washington, D.C.

=== Volunteer work ===
- Music Maker Relief Foundation (board of directors)
- Valley Health System (board of governors)
- Farmers New World Life Insurance Company (board member)

== See also ==
- 2008 United States House of Representatives elections in Nevada#District 3

U.S. House of Representatives
New constituency	Member of the U.S. House of Representatives from Nevada's 3rd congressional district 2003–2009	Succeeded by Dina Titus
U.S. order of precedence (ceremonial)
Preceded by Tim Huelskamp as Former U.S. Representative	Order of precedence of the United States as Former U.S. Representative	Succeeded by Joe Heck as Former U.S. Representative
