= Dina Titus =

American politician (born 1950)

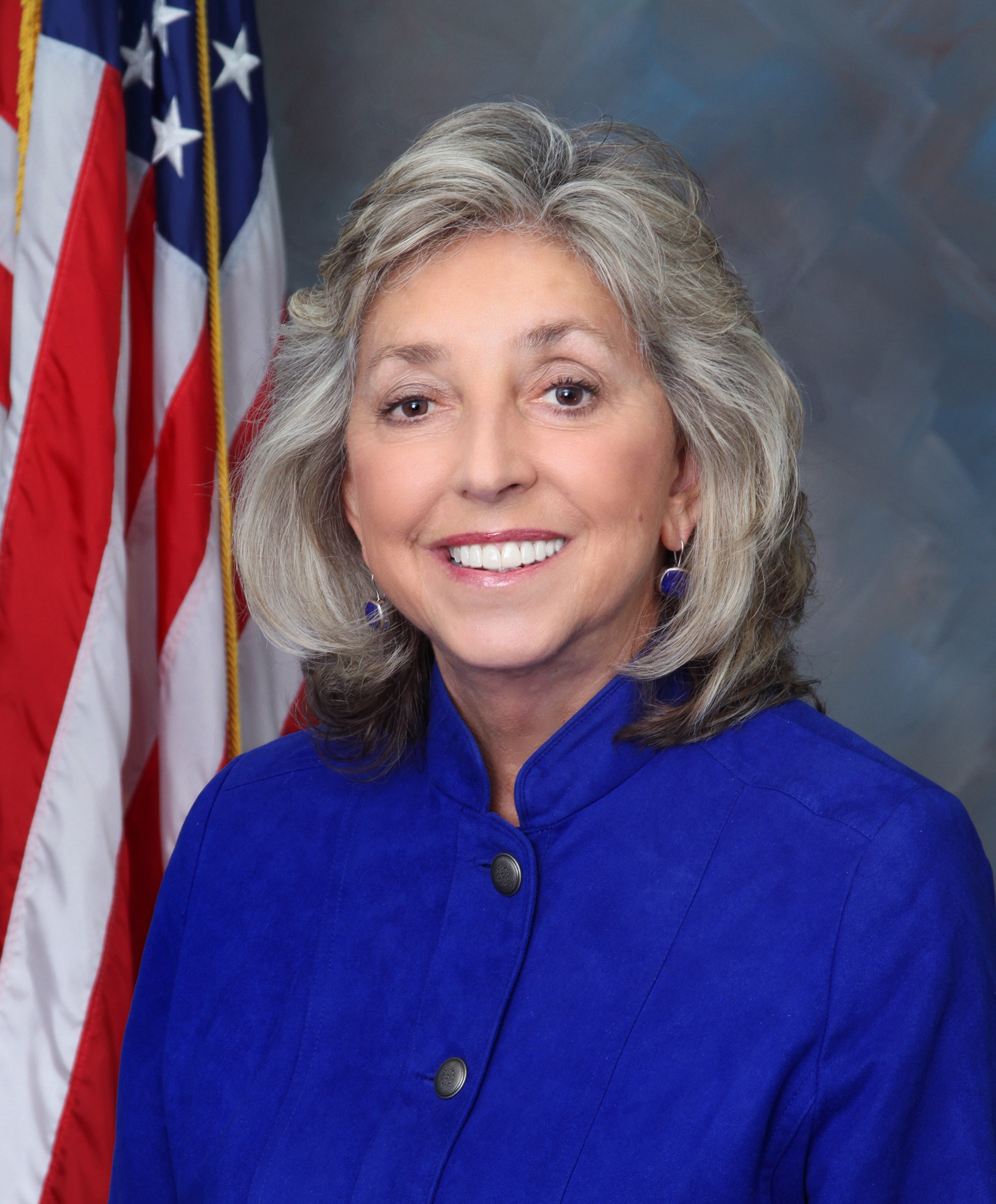
- Official portrait, 2015

Member of the U.S. House of Representatives from Nevada
- Incumbent
- Assumed office January 3, 2013
- Preceded by: Shelley Berkley
- Constituency: 1st district
- In office January 3, 2009 – January 3, 2011
- Preceded by: Jon Porter
- Succeeded by: Joe Heck
- Constituency: 3rd district

Member of the Nevada Senate from the 7th district
- In office 1988–2008
- Preceded by: Herbert Jones
- Succeeded by: David Parks

Personal details
- Born: Alice Constandina Titus; May 23, 1950 (age 76) Thomasville, Georgia, U.S.
- Party: Democratic
- Spouse: Thomas Wright (m. 1979)
- Education: College of William and Mary (BA); University of Georgia (MA); Florida State University (PhD)
- Website: House website Campaign website
- Titus's voice Titus supporting the 2013 Small Airplane Revitalization Act. Recorded July 16, 2013.

Alice Constandina "Dina" Titus (/ˈtaɪtəs/ TY-təss; born May 23, 1950) is an American politician who has been the United States representative for Nevada's 1st congressional district since 2013. Previously, she served as the U.S. representative for Nevada's 3rd congressional district from 2009 to 2011. Titus is a member of the Democratic Party.

Titus was first elected to the House in 2008. After losing re-election in 2010 to Joe Heck, she was re-elected to a more Democratic seat in 2012, and has been re-elected ever since. Prior to her elections to Congress, Titus was a professor of political science at the University of Nevada, Las Vegas (UNLV), and was the Democratic nominee for governor of Nevada in 2006, losing to Republican Jim Gibbons.

Titus is expected to become the dean of Nevada's congressional delegation in 2027 upon the retirement of representative Mark Amodei.

== Early life, education, and career ==
Titus was born in Thomasville, Georgia. She graduated from the College of William & Mary with a bachelor's degree in political science. Titus earned a master's degree from the University of Georgia and a Ph.D. from Florida State University.

Titus taught in the political science department at the University of Nevada, Las Vegas (UNLV), retiring in 2011.

== Nevada Senate ==
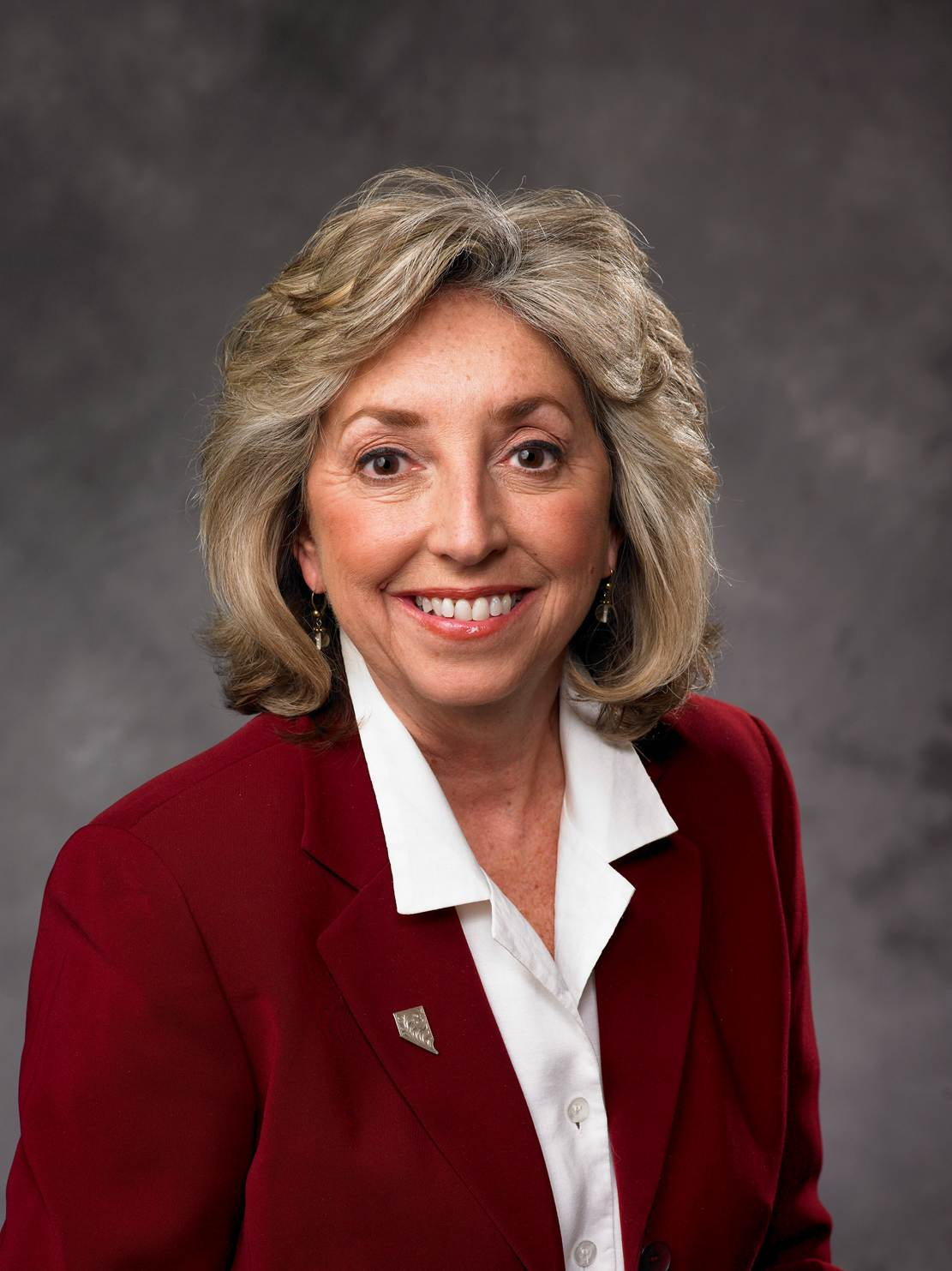
Titus during the 111th Congress

First elected in 1988, Titus served for 20 years in the Nevada Senate, representing the 7th district.

In December 2010, Senate majority leader Harry Reid appointed her to a six-year term on the United States Commission on Civil Rights.

Titus authored a bill banning "universal default clauses" that have enabled some credit card issuers to boost interest rates by 30% or more. The bill passed the Senate and Assembly, but was vetoed by Gibbons. Credit card providers Citibank and Chase rolled back or eliminated universal default clauses due to political pressure in the U.S. Congress.

== 2006 gubernatorial election campaign ==
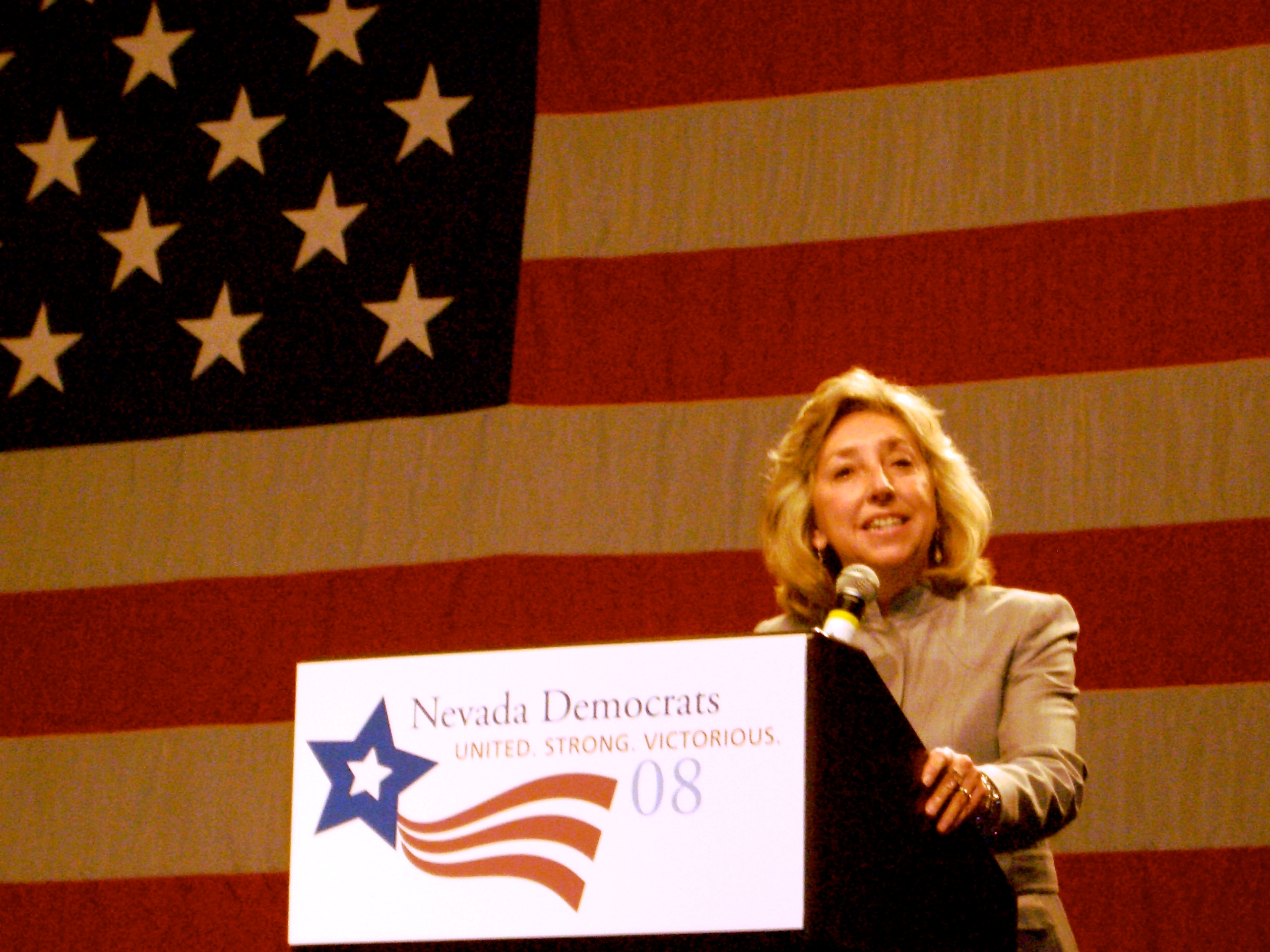
Titus at the 2008 Nevada Democratic State Convention

Incumbent Republican Nevada governor Kenny Guinn could not run again in 2006 due to strict absolute lifetime term limit laws. Titus won the Democratic nomination, but lost to Republican congressman Jim Gibbons. Titus won Clark County, but her margin there was not enough to overcome Gibbons's landslide margin in the 2nd district.

== U.S. House of Representatives ==
=== Elections ===
==== 2008 ====
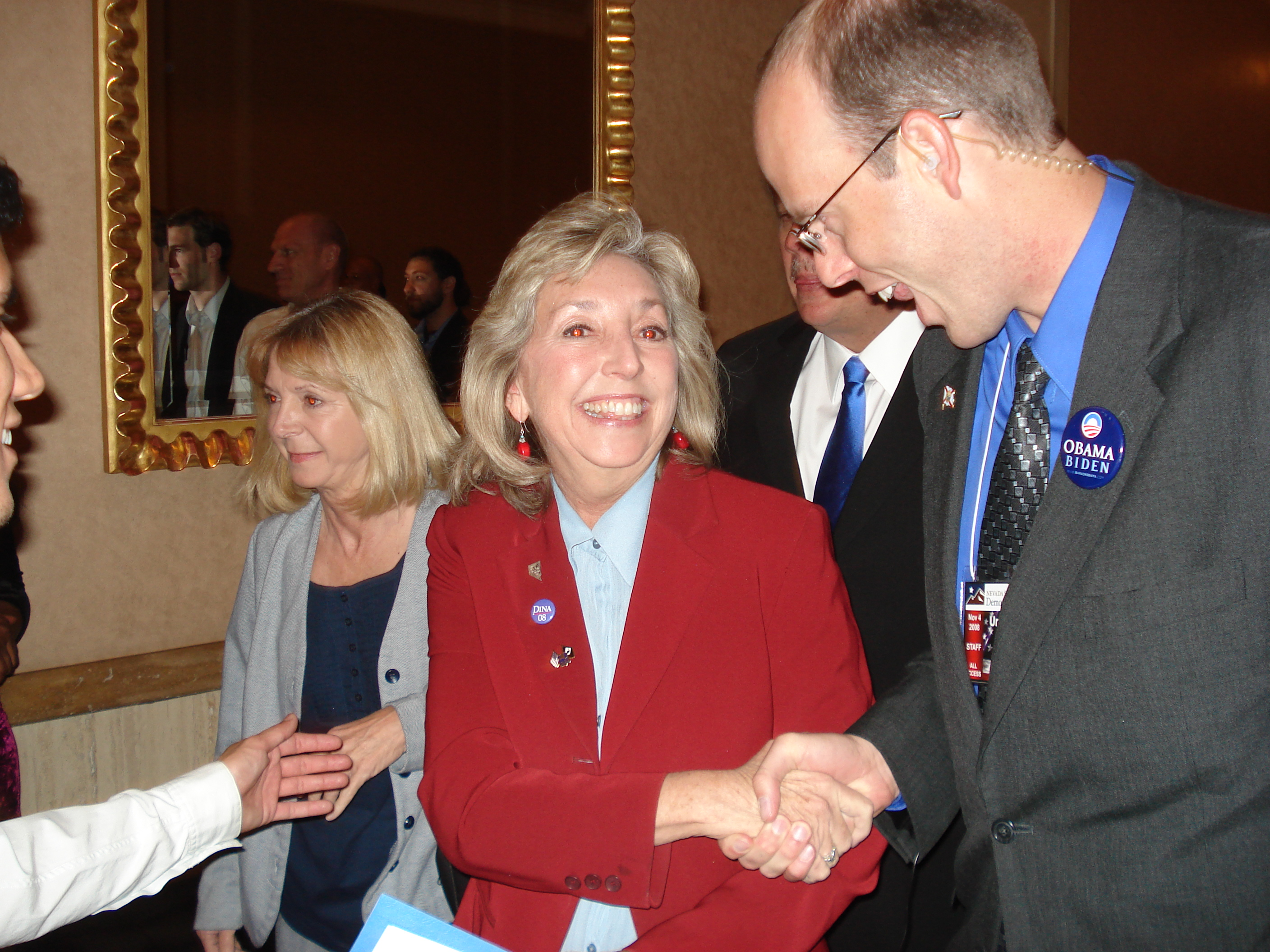
Dina Titus in Las Vegas, November 2008

Democrats were heavily targeting 3rd district Republican incumbent Jon Porter. Their top candidate was Clark County prosecutor Robert Daskas, but Daskas dropped out in April for family reasons. Democrats then recruited Titus, who had won the district in her unsuccessful 2006 run for governor. Titus defeated Porter in November, 47% to 42%, becoming the first Democrat to represent the district. She was a major beneficiary of the overall anti-Bush sentiment in the Las Vegas area. She was elected Regional Whip in the 111th Congress.

==== 2010 ====
Republican former state senator Joe Heck defeated Titus by less than 2,000 votes.

==== 2012 ====
On October 31, 2011, Titus entered the Democratic primary for Nevada's 1st congressional district, where her home had been placed by redistricting. The incumbent, Democrat Shelley Berkley, gave up the seat to run for the United States Senate. While the 3rd is considered a swing district, the 1st is far and away Nevada's safest Democratic seat. Titus initially faced a challenge from State Senator Ruben Kihuen in the primary. Kihuen dropped out in February 2012, reportedly due to trailing in polls and fundraising. This all but assured Titus's return to Congress after a two-year absence. She easily defeated her Republican challenger, Chris Edwards.

==== 2014 ====
Titus was reelected, defeating Republican nominee Annette Teijeiro with 56.9% of the vote. After this election, she became the only Democratic member of Nevada's U.S. House delegation, as fellow Democrat Steven Horsford was defeated.

==== 2016 ====
Titus defeated Republican nominee Mary D. Perry with 61.9% of the vote to Perry's 28.8%; independent Reuben D'Silva received 7.4%. This election saw Democrats pick up two U.S. House seats in Nevada.

==== 2018 ====
Titus defeated Republican nominee Joyce Bentley with 66.2% of the vote, her highest percentage to date.

==== 2020 ====
Titus won a rematch with Bentley, this time with 61.8% of the vote to Bentley's 33.4%.

==== 2022 ====
Titus was redistricted into a much more competitive district. She faced progressive Amy Vilela in the Democratic primary, winning with 79.8% of the vote; in the general election, Titus defeated Republican nominee Mark Robertson, 51.6% to 46.0%. Most poll aggregators rated the race a tossup.

==== 2024 ====
Titus won the general election with 52.0% of the vote in a rematch with Mark Robertson.

=== Tenure ===
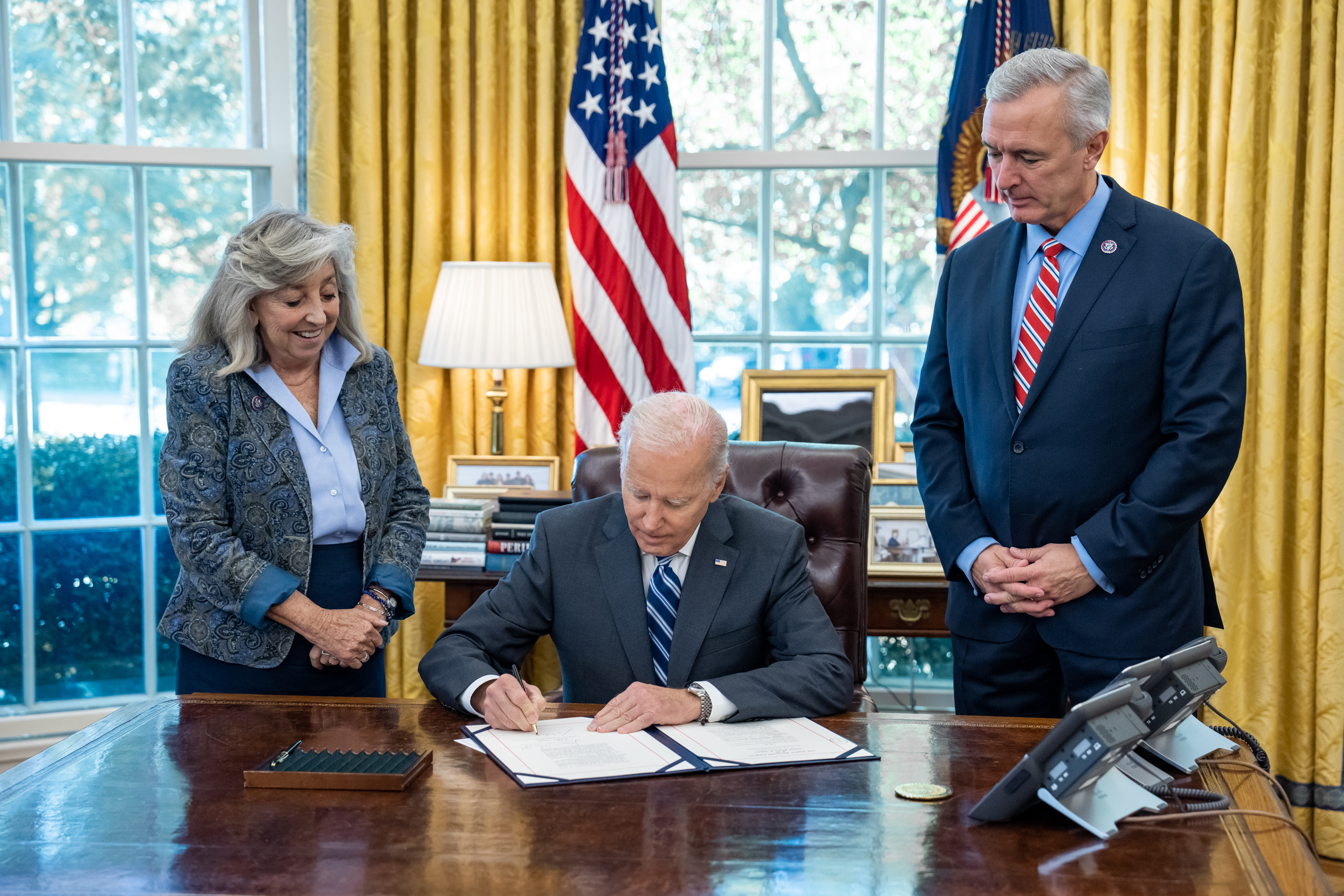
Titus and Rep. John Katko (R-NY) watch President Joe Biden sign a bill they sponsored.

On December 18, 2019, Titus voted for both articles of impeachment against President Donald Trump.

Titus voted with President Joe Biden's stated position 100% of the time in the 117th Congress, according to a FiveThirtyEight analysis.

Titus supported a 2022 rule change which allowed congressional staff to unionize. However, when her own staff voted to form a union in 2023, Titus quashed the effort. According to The Nevada Independent, the failed unionization effort "left staffers disappointed, but unsurprised." The Independent wrote that "ex-staffers described Titus as a vindictive and harsh boss, quick to berate staffers, who ran an office culture that many called toxic and raised ethical questions." Four former staffers said they had wanted to unionize because they were worried they were being asked to do work, including unpaid campaign work, that violated ethics laws. The Hatch Act requires that members of Congress separate their official business from their campaign work, limiting the politicization of taxpayer-funded work. Titus said accusations against her were "unsubstantiated claims by former, anonymous, disgruntled employees." Titus continued, "Jobs in my office are hard jobs and I have high standards.... I'm not apologizing for this. People don't send us back here and pay our salaries to drink lattes and view Tik-Tok from 9-5, Mon.-Fri."

=== Committee assignments ===
For the 119th Congress:

- Committee on Foreign Affairs
  - Subcommittee on Europe
  - Subcommittee on Western Hemisphere
- Committee on Transportation and Infrastructure
  - Subcommittee on Aviation
  - Subcommittee on Economic Development, Public Buildings, and Emergency Management
  - Subcommittee on Highways and Transit
  - Subcommittee on Railroads, Pipelines, and Hazardous Materials (Ranking Member)

=== Caucus memberships ===
- Black Maternal Health Caucus
- Congressional Arts Caucus
- Congressional Asian Pacific American Caucus
- Congressional Equality Caucus
- Congressional Motorcycle Caucus
- Congressional Ukraine Caucus
- United States Congressional International Conservation Caucus
- U.S.-Japan Caucus
- Congressional Caucus for the Equal Rights Amendment
- Congressional Hellenic Caucus (vice chair)
- Medicare for All Caucus
- Blue Collar Caucus
- Americans Abroad Caucus (chair)
- Colorado River Caucus

== Political positions ==
=== Abortion ===
In 2014, Titus received a 100% rating from Planned Parenthood for opposing a nationwide abortion ban after 20 weeks and supporting abortion access in the District of Columbia and through the Affordable Care Act.

=== Agriculture ===
Titus supports reforms to agricultural commodity checkoff programs. She has authored the Opportunities for Fairness in Farming (OFF) Act, which would require federal checkoff programs to publish budgets, submit to audits, and refrain from contracting with organizations engaged in lobbying or anticompetitive behavior.

In 2024, Titus introduced legislation to improve animal welfare standards in livestock transportation by strengthening enforcement of time limits for transporting animals and prohibiting the interstate transportation of sick and injured animals.

=== Animal welfare ===
In 2019, Titus authored legislation that would have required entities governed by the Animal Welfare Act to create a viable plan to protect their animals in case of natural disaster.

Titus is a founder of the Congressional Wild Horse Caucus, which supports policies to protect wild horses and promote humane methods of conservation and population control. In 2024, Titus introduced legislation to prohibit the Bureau of Land Management from using helicopters and airplanes to round up wild horses and burros. In 2025, she criticized a Trump administration proposal to cut funding for wild horse management and allow horses in federal custody to be sold for slaughter.

=== Armenia–Azerbaijan war ===
In September 2020, Titus started a successful petition to rename a Library of Congress heading from "Armenian massacres" to "Armenian genocide" in the wake of Armenian genocide recognition by the United States Congress in 2019.

On October 1, 2020, Titus co-signed a letter to Secretary of State Mike Pompeo that condemned Azerbaijan's offensive operations against the Armenian-populated enclave of Nagorno-Karabakh, denounced Turkey's role in the Nagorno-Karabakh conflict, and called for an immediate ceasefire.

=== Immigration ===
In June 2017, Titus who voted against the No Sanctuary for Criminals Act, which would have penalized jurisdictions that limit cooperation with federal immigration enforcement and expanded mandatory detention requirements.

In 2021, Titus was an original cosponsor for the U.S. Citizenship Act of 2021, which would grant a pathway to citizenship for as many as 11 million illegal immigrants while rolling back multiple Trump-era enforcement measures.

In 2025, Titus was one of 46 House Democrats who joined all Republicans to vote for the Laken Riley Act.

=== Redistricting ===
In 2021, Democrats in control of Nevada's state legislature gerrymandered districts to make two swing districts stronger for Democrats, making Titus' district more competitive in the process. On December 16, 2021, Titus expressed her frustration with the process of redrawing Nevada's congressional districts to make them more electorally competitive. According to the Nevada Current, she told an AFL-CIO town hall, "I totally got fucked by the legislature on my district." She added, "I'm sorry to say it like that, but I don't know any other way to say it." She warned that three safe seats were then at risk of turning Republican in the 2022 U.S. House elections.

=== Voting rights ===
On February 9, 2023, Titus voted against H.J.Res. 24: Disapproving the action of the District of Columbia Council in approving the Local Resident Voting Rights Amendment Act of 2022 which condemns the District of Columbia's plan that would allow noncitizens to vote in local elections.

=== Syria ===
In 2023, Titus voted against H.Con.Res. 21 which directed President Joe Biden to remove U.S. troops from Syria within 180 days.

=== Public Access to Law ===
In 2025, Titus, Deborah Ross, and Lance Gooden introduced the Pro Codes Act. If enacted, the bill would allow private, for-profit corporations to claim copyright of laws based on the "model codes" they sell to government bodies. This would overturn cases like Veeck v. Southern Building Code Congress Int'l that have held that the public has the right to view, copy, dissect, and critique laws they are held to regardless of the authorship of the text.

== Personal life ==
Titus has been married to Thomas C. Wright since 1979. Wright is a retired professor of history at UNLV. His studies in Latin American history have taken the couple on extended journeys throughout Central and South America and to Spain.

She is Greek Orthodox.

== Bibliography ==
Titus is the author of Bombs in the Backyard: Atomic Testing and American Politics and Battle Born: Federal-State Relations in Nevada During the Twentieth Century.

== See also ==
- Women in the United States House of Representatives

Party political offices
Preceded by Joe Neal	Democratic nominee for Governor of Nevada; 2006	Succeeded by Rory Reid
U.S. House of Representatives
Preceded by Jon Porter	Member of the U.S. House of Representatives from Nevada's 3rd congressional district 2009–2011	Succeeded by Joe Heck
Preceded by Shelley Berkley	Member of the U.S. House of Representatives from Nevada's 1st congressional district 2013–present	Incumbent
Preceded by Vern Buchanan	Ranking Member of the House Democracy Partnership; 2023–present	Incumbent
U.S. order of precedence (ceremonial)
Preceded by Thomas Massie	United States representatives by seniority 97th	Succeeded by Andy Barr
