= Mason-Dixon Polling & Strategy =

Independent polling firm

Mason-Dixon Polling & Strategy is an independent polling firm that conducts voter surveys for news media, lobbyists, advocacy groups, trade associations, and political action committees. Mason-Dixon is the United States's most active state polling organization, conducting copyrighted public opinion polls for news media organizations in all 50 states. These media clients include over 250 local television affiliates and over 100 daily newspapers. The polling firm tends to slightly lean conservative and has a B+ rating according to FiveThirtyEight.

Since the 2014 elections, Mason-Dixon has conducted 51 voter surveys for general elections.
