= 2011 Nevada's 2nd congressional district special election =

- September 13, 2011
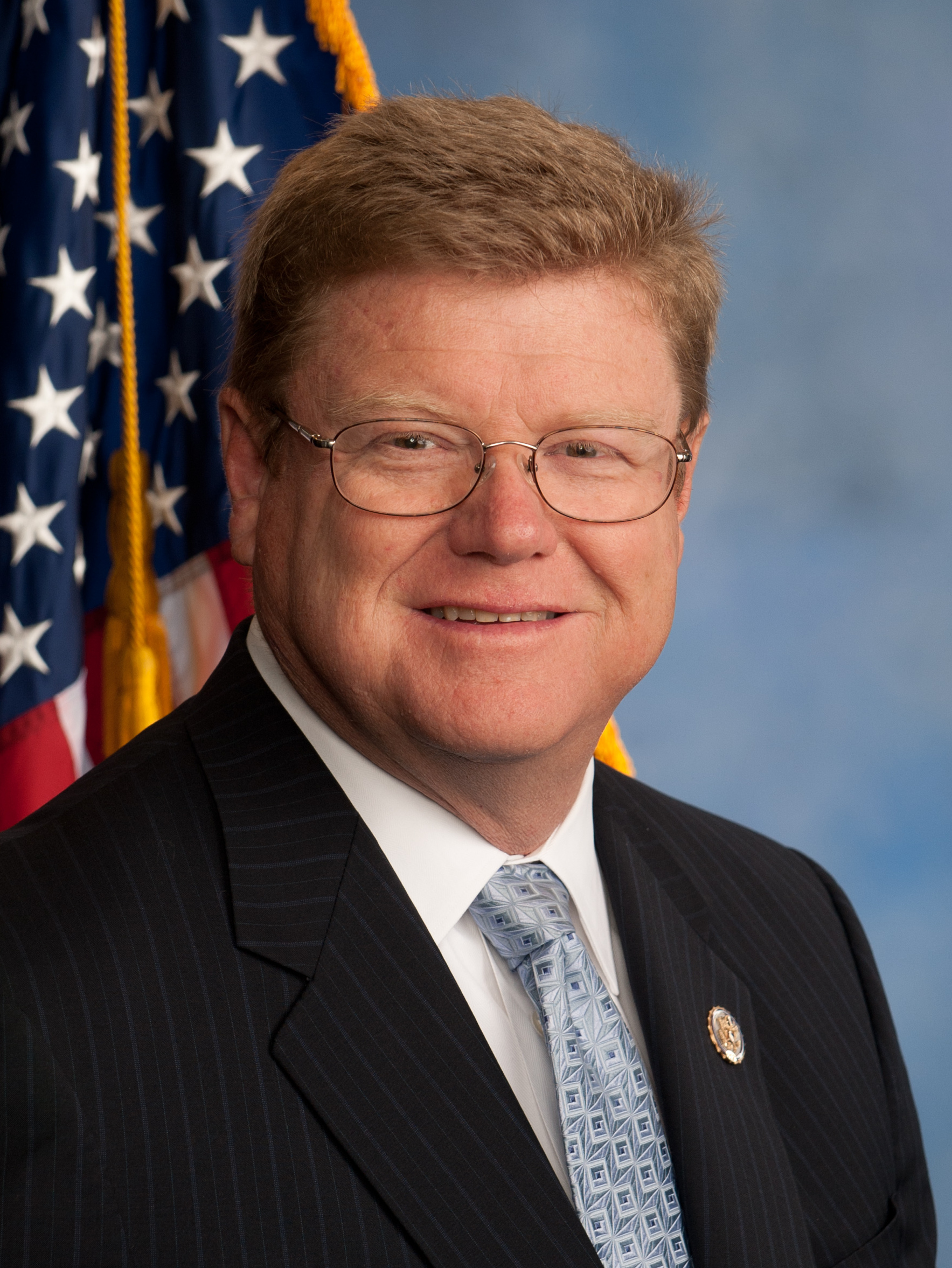

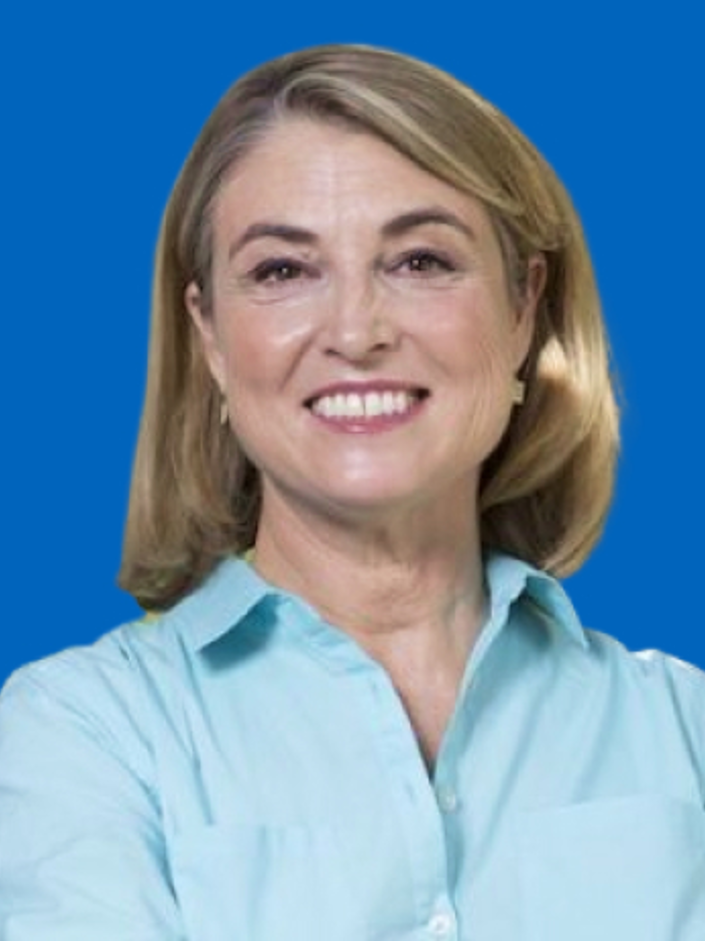
| Nominee | Mark Amodei | Kate Marshall |
| Party | Republican | Democratic |
| Popular vote | 75,180 | 46,818 |
| Percentage | 57.92% | 36.07% |
- County results Amodei: 50–60% 60–70% 70–80%
Representative before election
Dean Heller
Republican
Elected Representative
Mark Amodei
Republican

On September 13, 2011, a special election was held in Nevada's 2nd congressional district to fill the vacancy created by the resignation of Republican Dean Heller, who was appointed to the United States Senate.

The race was called for Mark Amodei by the Associated Press just after 10 p.m. local time with 44% of precincts reporting and Amodei leading Marshall 57% to 37%. Amodei easily won the election by a margin of 58% to 36%.

== Rules ==
On May 2, 2011, Nevada Secretary of State Ross Miller announced the election, held under an untested 2003 law for replacing House members, would be open to any and all qualified candidates, without primary elections or nominations made by parties' central committees.

The Republican Party filed suit challenging Miller's plan, preferring instead that each party be required to nominate a single candidate. The party's complaint stated that "A fundamental principle of Nevada's electoral statutes is that, in a partisan election, there shall be only one nominee from each political party." On May 19, District Judge Todd Russell sided with the Republican Party and ruling that the major parties would hold conventions in order to each nominate a single candidate. Miller asked the office of the Nevada Attorney General to appeal the case to the Supreme Court of Nevada, which on May 31 issued an order instructing Miller and the state's political parties to address whether the election can be rescheduled due to concerns that the ongoing dispute over its rules may necessitate a delay.

== Democratic nomination ==
=== Nominee ===
- Kate Marshall, Nevada State Treasurer

=== Declared candidates ===
- George S. Bay
- Chad Dehne, U.S. Marine Corps veteran
- Blake Franzman
- R. J. Gillum
- Zach Jones
- Kate Marshall, Nevada State Treasurer
- Jacques Maye
- Nancy Price, former regent of the Nevada System of Higher Education and unsuccessful candidate for the 2nd district in 2010
- Rex Ricks

=== Declined to run ===
- Jill Derby, former regent of the Nevada System of Higher Education and unsuccessful candidate for the 2nd district in 2006 and 2008

== Republican nomination ==
The central committee of the Nevada Republican Party voted to decide the Republican nominee in June 2011. Any Republican who receives at least two votes from members of the central committee can compete in the nomination process, which will be held under a two-round system.

=== Nominee ===
- Mark Amodei, state party chairman and former State Senator

=== Declared candidates ===
- Mark Amodei, state party chairman and former State Senator
- Greg Brower, State Senator and former United States Attorney
- Hal Carmack
- Guy Felton
- William R. Graves
- Edward Hamilton, perennial candidate
- Ryan Henderson, optician
- Greg Hudson
- Robert X. Leeds
- Kirk Lippold, former USS Cole commander
- Daniel Miller
- Troy "Gunny" Orosco
- Phillip D. Telander
- Busch Voigts Jr.
- Jonathan M. Yuspa
- Sidney Zeller, U.S. Marine Corps veteran

=== Declined to run ===
- Sharron Angle, former member of the Nevada Assembly and 2010 Republican nominee for the U.S. Senate
- Brian Krolicki, Lieutenant Governor of Nevada

== Independent American Party nomination ==
=== Declared candidates ===
- Timothy Fasano

== Independent candidates ==
- Earl Ammerman
- Roland Lee
- Helmuth Lehmann, businessman and author
- Christopher Simon

== General election ==
=== Polling ===
| Poll source | Date(s) administered | Sample size | Margin of error | Mark Amodei (R) | Kate Marshall (D) | Timothy Fasano (IAP) | Helmuth Lehmann (I) | Undecided |
|---|---|---|---|---|---|---|---|---|
| Public Policy Polling | September 9–11, 2011 | 629 | ± 3.9% | 50% | 37% | 4% | 4% | 5% |
| Public Policy Polling • | August 18–21, 2011 | 600 | ± 4.0% | 43% | 42% | 3% | 3% | 8% |

- • Commissioned by Daily Kos and the SEIU

=== Results ===
Nevada's 2nd congressional district special election, 2011
| Party | Candidate | Votes | % |
|---|---|---|---|
| Republican | Mark Amodei | 75,180 | 57.92 |
| Democratic | Kate Marshall | 46,818 | 36.07 |
| Independent | Helmuth Lehmann | 5,372 | 4.14 |
| Independent American | Timothy Fasano | 2,421 | 1.87 |
| Total votes | | 129,791 | 100.0 |
| Republican hold | | | |

==== By county ====
| County | Mark Amodei Republican | | Kate Marshall Democratic | | Various candidates Other parties | | Margin | | Total |
| County | # | % | # | % | # | % | # | % | Total |
|---|---|---|---|---|---|---|---|---|---|
| Carson City | 6,472 | 59.7% | 3,824 | 35.3% | 545 | 5.0% | 2,648 | 24.4% | 10,841 |
| Churchill | 3,002 | 68.5% | 993 | 22.7% | 387 | 8.8% | 2,009 | 45.8% | 4,382 |
| Clark (part) | 3,502 | 59.5% | 2,181 | 37.1% | 201 | 3.4% | 1,321 | 22.4% | 5,884 |
| Douglas | 7,866 | 67.0% | 3,284 | 28.0% | 582 | 5.0% | 4,582 | 39.0% | 11,732 |
| Elko | 3,369 | 72.9% | 962 | 20.8% | 293 | 6.3% | 2,407 | 52.1% | 4,624 |
| Esmeralda | 158 | 75.2% | 30 | 14.3% | 22 | 10.5% | 128 | 60.9% | 210 |
| Eureka | 272 | 73.7% | 69 | 18.7% | 28 | 7.6% | 203 | 55.0% | 369 |
| Humboldt | 1,471 | 65.8% | 580 | 26.0% | 184 | 8.3% | 891 | 39.8% | 2,235 |
| Lander | 597 | 74.0% | 131 | 16.2% | 79 | 9.8% | 466 | 57.8% | 807 |
| Lincoln | 503 | 77.0% | 119 | 18.2% | 31 | 4.7% | 384 | 58.8% | 653 |
| Lyon | 5,833 | 65.9% | 2,413 | 27.3% | 601 | 6.8% | 3,420 | 38.6% | 8,847 |
| Mineral | 514 | 52.4% | 335 | 34.1% | 132 | 13.5% | 179 | 18.3% | 981 |
| Nye | 2,746 | 61.7% | 1,407 | 31.6% | 300 | 6.8% | 1,339 | 30.1% | 4,453 |
| Pershing | 525 | 60.4% | 217 | 25.0% | 127 | 14.6% | 308 | 35.4% | 869 |
| Storey | 658 | 58.4% | 360 | 31.9% | 109 | 9.6% | 298 | 26.5% | 1,127 |
| Washoe | 36,797 | 52.3% | 29,510 | 41.9% | 4,082 | 5.8% | 7,287 | 4.21% | 70,389 |
| White Pine | 895 | 64.5% | 403 | 29.0% | 90 | 6.5% | 492 | 35.5% | 1,388 |
| Totals | 74,976 | 57.9% | 46,669 | 36.1% | 7,769 | 6.0% | 28,307 | 21.8% | 129,414 |

== See also ==
- List of special elections to the United States House of Representatives
- 2012 United States House of Representatives elections in Nevada
