= 2012 United States Senate election in Nevada =

- November 6, 2012
- Turnout: 57.1% (voting eligible)
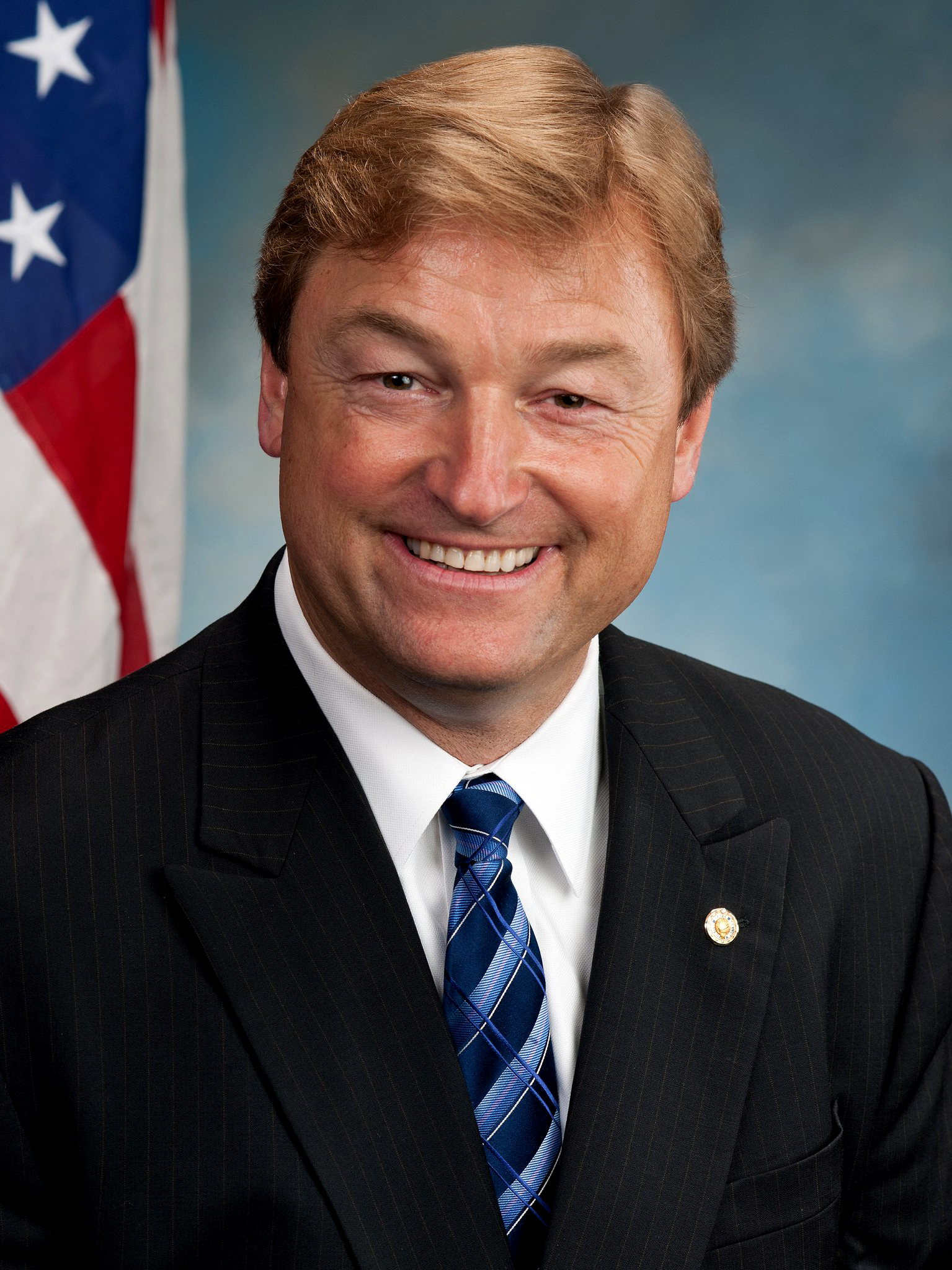

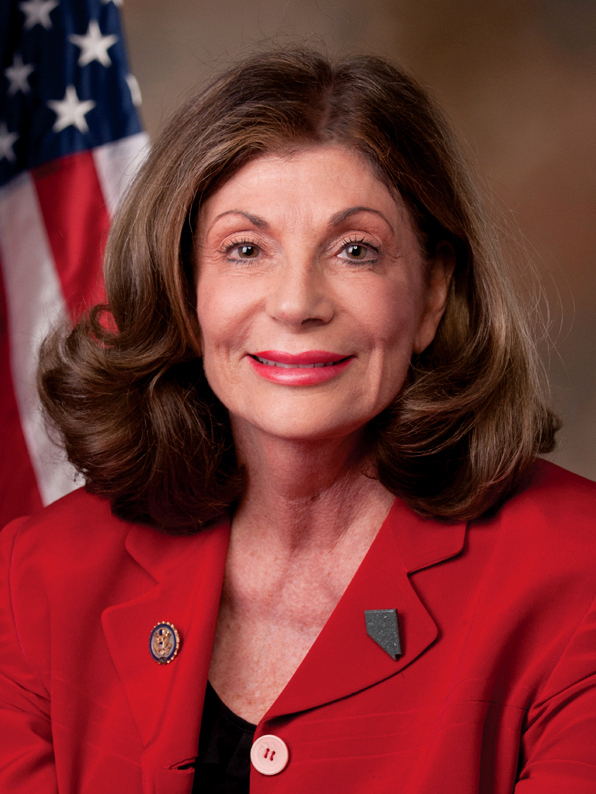
Nominee	Dean Heller	Shelley Berkley
Party	Republican	Democratic
Popular vote	457,656	446,080
Percentage	45.87%	44.71%
- Heller: 40–50% 50–60% 60–70% 70–80% Berkley: 40–50% 50–60%
U.S. senator before election
Dean Heller (Note: In May 2011, Heller was appointed by Governor Brian Sandoval to fill the vacancy caused by the resignation of Senator John Ensign.)
Republican
Elected U.S. Senator
Dean Heller
Republican

The 2012 United States Senate election in Nevada was held on Tuesday, November 6, 2012, concurrently with elections to the United States Senate in other states, elections to the United States House of Representatives, and the 2012 presidential election. The primary election was held on June 12, 2012.

Incumbent Republican U.S. Senator Dean Heller, who was appointed to his seat in May 2011 following the resignation of Senator John Ensign, was narrowly elected to a full term over Representative Shelley Berkley, despite President Barack Obama carrying the state by 6.7% in the concurrent presidential election. As a result, Heller became the only Republican Senate candidate in 2012 to win in a state that was lost by the Republican presidential candidate. With a margin of 1.2%, this election was the second-closest race of the 2012 Senate election cycle, behind only the election in North Dakota.

Despite the resignation of Ensign, this was not a special election. Nevada was the only state that had vacancy in Senate election already regularly scheduled for 2012. As of 2026, this is the last time that Republicans won a U.S. Senate election in Nevada.

== Background ==
Ensign was re-elected to the United States Senate in 2006 against Jack Carter, son of former president Jimmy Carter, 55% to 41%. His re-election campaign was expected to be complicated after it was revealed in 2009 that he had been involved in an extramarital affair with the wife of one of his campaign staffers, allegedly made payments to the woman's family and arranged work for her husband to cover himself.

The Senate Ethics Committee was to investigate Ensign, and his poll numbers declined significantly. There was speculation that he might resign before the election, but he initially said he would run for reelection. On March 7, 2011, Ensign announced that he would not seek reelection, and on April 22, he announced that he would resign effective May 3.

Nevada Governor Brian Sandoval appointed U.S. Representative Dean Heller to fill the vacancy created by Ensign's resignation. Heller took office on May 9, 2011.

== Republican primary ==
=== Candidates ===
==== Nominated ====
- Dean Heller, incumbent U.S. senator, former U.S. representative, former Nevada secretary of state and former state assemblyman

==== Eliminated in primary ====
- Sherry Brooks, retired secretary
- Richard Charles
- Eddie Hamilton, retired auto executive and perennial candidate
- Carlo Poliak, sanitation worker and perennial candidate
- David Lory Vanderbeek, marriage and family therapist

==== Declined ====
- Sharron Angle, former state assembly member and nominee for U.S. Senate in 2010
- John Chachas, businessman
- John Ensign, former U.S. senator
- Sue Lowden, former state senator and candidate for U.S. Senate in 2010
- Brian Krolicki, lieutenant governor
- Jon Porter, former U.S representative
- Danny Tarkanian, businessman, nominee for secretary of state of Nevada in 2006 and candidate for U.S. Senate in 2010 (running for the 4th district)

=== Polling ===
Hypothetical polling

Primary

Poll source	Date(s) administered	Sample size	Margin of error	Sharron Angle	John Chachas	John Ensign	Dean Heller	Brian Krolicki	Sue Lowden	Danny Tarkanian	Undecided
Public Policy Polling	January 3–5, 2011	400	±4.9%	9%	5%	20%	30%	6%	12%	10%	8%

Appointment preference

Poll source	Date(s) administered	Sample size	Margin of error	Sue Lowden	Brian Sandoval	Danny Tarkanian	Undecided
Mason-Dixon/LVJR	October 8, 2009	4%	24%	14%	17%	17%	21%

Primaries with Ensign

Poll source	Date(s) administered	Sample size	Margin of error	John Ensign	Dean Heller	Other	Undecided
Public Policy Polling	October 7–9, 2010	400	±4.9%	45%	37%	––	18%
Public Policy Polling	January 3–5, 2011	400	±4.9%	34%	52%	––	13%

Poll source	Date(s) administered	Sample size	Margin of error	John Ensign	Brian Krolicki	Other	Undecided
Public Policy Polling	October 7–9, 2010	400	±4.9%	55%	27%	––	18%

=== Results ===
Republican primary results
Party	Candidate	Votes	%
Republican	Dean Heller (incumbent)	88,958	86.3
Republican	Sherry Brooks	5,356	5.2
None of These Candidates		3,358	3.3
Republican	Eddie "In Liberty" Hamilton	2,628	2.6
Republican	Richard Charles	2,295	2.2
Republican	Carlo "Nakusa" Poliak	512	0.5
Total votes		103,107	100.0

== Democratic primary ==
=== Candidates ===
==== Nominated ====
- Shelley Berkley, U.S. representative

==== Eliminated in primary ====
- Steve Brown, businessman
- Barry Ellsworth, renewable energy executive
- Louis Macias, art dealer
- Nancy Price, former regent of the Nevada System of Higher Education and Democratic nominee for the 2nd congressional district in 2010

==== Withdrew ====
- Byron Georgiou, businessman

==== Declined ====
- Catherine Cortez Masto, Nevada attorney general
- Oscar Goodman, former mayor of Las Vegas
- Kate Marshall, Nevada state treasurer
- Ross Miller, secretary of state of Nevada
- Dina Titus, former U.S. representative and nominee for governor in 2006 (running for the 1st district)

=== Polling ===
Hypothetical polling

Poll source	Date(s) administered	Sample size	Margin of error	Shelley Berkley	Byron Georgiou	Other	Undecided
Public Policy Polling	April 21–24, 2011	300	±5.7%	65%	8%	––	27%
Public Policy Polling	July 28–31, 2011	400	±4.9%	71%	6%	––	23%

=== Results ===
Results by county: Berkley—80–90% Berkley—70–80% Berkley—60–70% Berkley—50–60% Berkley—40–50%

Democratic primary results
Party	Candidate	Votes	%
Democratic	Shelley Berkley	62,081	79.5
Democratic	Nancy Price	4,210	5.4
Democratic	Steve Brown	3,998	5.1
None of These Candidates		3,637	4.7
Democratic	Barry Ellsworth	2,491	3.2
Democratic	Louis Macias	1,714	2.2
Total votes		78,131	100

== General election ==
=== Candidates ===
- Shelley Berkley (D), U.S. representative
- Dean Heller (R), incumbent U.S. senator
- David Lory VanDerBeek (Independent American Party of Nevada), therapist

=== Campaign ===
On July 9, the United States House Committee on Ethics voted unanimously to form an investigative subcommittee to see whether Berkley used her official position to advocate for policy that benefited her family's financial situation. More specifically, Berkley was accused of pushing healthcare legislation that would benefit her husband's medical practice as well as she was blamed for her efforts to block the closure of a kidney transplant center where her husband was employed.

=== Debates ===
The first Berkley-Heller debate was on September 27, 2012. They met again in Las Vegas on October 11 and on Jon Ralston's "Face to Face" program on October 15.

- Complete video of debate, September 27, 2012 - C-SPAN
- Complete video of debate, October 11, 2012 - C-SPAN

=== Fundraising ===
Candidate (party)	Receipts	Disbursements	Cash on hand	Debt
Dean Heller (R)	$8,447,489	$6,510,874	$1,936,618	$0
Shelley Berkley (D)	$8,779,074	$8,947,424	$924,918	$0
Source: Federal Election Commission

==== Top contributors ====
Shelly Berkley	Contribution	Dean Heller	Contribution
EMILY's List	$93,049	Las Vegas Sands	$43,750
NORPAC	$59,750	MGM Resorts International	$35,500
MGM Resorts International	$53,700	Alliance Resource Partners	$34,500
DaVita Inc.	$49,300	Crow Holdings	$30,000
Diamond Resorts	$44,000	Elliott Management Corporation	$29,413
Cantor Fitzgerald	$27,000	Brady Industries	$25,000
Caesars Entertainment	$26,000	Mewbourne Oil Co	$25,000
Fresenius Medical Care	$24,500	Wynn Resorts	$22,500
Brownstein Hyatt Farber Schreck	$23,650	Southwest Gas	$21,800
Station Casinos	$20,200	Bank of America	$20,500

==== Top industries ====
Shelley Berkley	Contribution	Dean Heller	Contribution
Lawyers/law firms	$607,407	Leadership PACs	$379,718
Pro-Israel	$384,580	Retired	$300,560
Health professionals	$369,954	Financial institutions	$217,084
Women's issues	$309,817	Real estate	$206,362
Leadership PACs	$292,500	Casinos/gambling	$205,832
Retired	$281,490	Oil & gas	$187,500
Real estate	$261,779	Insurance	$182,155
Financial institutions	$228,393	Lobbyists	$159,812
Casinos/gambling	$227,350	Mining	$149,745
Lobbyists	$175,147	Health professionals	$132,450

=== Polling ===
View source data.

Poll source	Date(s) administered	Sample size	Margin of error	Dean Heller (R)	Shelley Berkley (D)	Other	Undecided
Public Policy Polling	January 3–5, 2011	932	±3.2%	51%	38%	—	16%
Public Policy Polling	April 21–24, 2011	491	±4.4%	47%	43%	—	10%
Public Policy Polling	July 28–31, 2011	601	±4.0%	46%	43%	—	12%
Public Policy Polling	October 20–23, 2011	500	±4.4%	45%	45%	—	10%
Cannon Survey Center	December 12–20, 2011	600	±4.0%	43%	44%	—	6.9%
Rasmussen Reports	March 19, 2012	500	±4.5%	47%	40%	2%	11%
Public Policy Polling	March 29 – April 1, 2012	553	±4.2%	46%	43%	—	12%
Rasmussen Reports	April 30, 2012	500	±4.5%	51%	40%	2%	8%
NBC News/Marist	May 22–24, 2012	1,040	±3.0%	46%	44%	—	10%
Public Policy Polling	June 7–10, 2012	500	±4.4%	44%	43%	—	13%
Magellan Strategies	July 16–17, 2012	665	±3.8%	45%	42%	—	13%
Rasmussen Reports	July 24, 2012	500	±4.5%	51%	42%	2%	5%
LVRJ/Survey USA	August 16–21, 2012	869	±3.4%	44%	39%	9%	8%
Public Policy Polling	August 23–26, 2012	831	±3.4%	47%	45%	—	8%
Rasmussen Reports	September 18, 2012	500	±4.5%	42%	41%	4%	12%
Public Policy Polling	September 18–20, 2012	501	±4.4%	44%	48%	—	8%
NBC/WSJ/Marist	September 23–25, 2012	984	±3.1%	49%	43%	1%	6%
We Ask America	September 25–27, 2012	1,152	±3.1%	45%	45%	—	10%
Gravis Marketing	October 3, 2012	1,006	±3.1%	53%	36%	—	12%
Precision Opinion	October 6, 2012	1,521	±2.5%	45%	43%	—	12%
LVRJ/Survey USA	October 3–8, 2012	1,222	±2.9%	47%	39%	8%	6%
Rasmussen Reports	October 8, 2012	500	±4.5%	48%	45%	3%	4%
Suffolk	October 6–9, 2012	500	±4.4%	40%	37%	7%	14%
Public Policy Polling	October 8–10, 2012	594	±4.0%	47%	44%	4%	5%
LVRJ/Survey USA	October 11–15, 2012	806	±3.5%	46%	40%	8%	6%
Rasmussen Reports	October 15, 2012	500	±4.5%	50%	43%	4%	3%
Rasmussen Reports	October 23, 2012	500	±4.5%	50%	45%	1%	4%
Public Policy Polling	October 22–24, 2012	636	±3.9%	44%	44%	7%	5%
NBC/WSJ/Marist	October 23–24, 2012	1,042	±2.8%	48%	45%	2%	6%
LVRJ/SurveyUSA	October 23–29, 2012	1,212	±2.9%	46%	40%	10%	4%
Public Policy Polling	November 3–4, 2012	750	±3.6%	48%	46%	4%	1%

Hypothetical polling

Poll source	Date(s) administered	Sample size	Margin of error	Dean Heller (R)	Byron Georgiou (D)	Other	Undecided
Public Policy Polling	April 21–24, 2011	491	±4.4%	52%	28%	––	20%
Magellan Strategies (R)	June 21–22, 2011	720	±3.65%	46%	33%	––	21%
Public Policy Polling	July 28–31, 2011	601	±4.0%	48%	31%	––	20%

Poll source	Date(s) administered	Sample size	Margin of error	Dean Heller (R)	Oscar Goodman (D)	Other	Undecided
Public Policy Polling	January 3–5, 2011	932	±3.2%	45%	38%	––	16%

Poll source	Date(s) administered	Sample size	Margin of error	Dean Heller (R)	Catherine Cortez Masto (D)	Other	Undecided
Public Policy Polling	January 3–5, 2011	932	±3.2%	46%	37%	––	16%

Poll source	Date(s) administered	Sample size	Margin of error	Dean Heller (R)	Ross Miller (D)	Other	Undecided
Public Policy Polling	January 3–5, 2011	932	±3.2%	46%	34%	––	21%

with John Ensign

Poll source	Date(s) administered	Sample size	Margin of error	John Ensign (R)	Shelley Berkley (D)	Other	Undecided
Public Policy Polling	January 11–12, 2010	763	±3.6%	49%	40%	––	11%
Public Policy Polling	January 3–5, 2011	932	±3.2%	42%	45%	––	13%

Poll source	Date(s) administered	Sample size	Margin of error	John Ensign (R)	Catherine Cortez Masto (D)	Other	Undecided
Public Policy Polling	July 16–18, 2010	630	±3.9%	48%	38%	––	14%
Public Policy Polling	January 3–5, 2011	932	±3.2%	42%	44%	––	14%

Poll source	Date(s) administered	Sample size	Margin of error	John Ensign (R)	Oscar Goodman (D)	Other	Undecided
Public Policy Polling	January 11–12, 2010	763	±3.6%	43%	41%	––	16%
Public Policy Polling	January 3–5, 2011	932	±3.2%	35%	45%	––	20%

Poll source	Date(s) administered	Sample size	Margin of error	John Ensign (R)	Ross Miller (D)	Other	Undecided
Public Policy Polling	January 11–12, 2010	763	±3.6%	47%	36%	––	18%
Public Policy Polling	January 3–5, 2011	932	±3.2%	39%	40%	––	21%

Poll source	Date(s) administered	Sample size	Margin of error	John Ensign (R)	Dina Titus (D)	Other	Undecided
Public Policy Polling	July 16–18, 2010	630	±3.9%	51%	41%	––	8%

=== Predictions ===
Source	Ranking	As of
The Cook Political Report	Tossup	November 1, 2012
Inside Elections	Tilt R	November 2, 2012
Sabato's Crystal Ball	Lean R	November 5, 2012
Real Clear Politics	Tossup	November 5, 2012

=== Results ===
On election day, Heller edged out Berkley by just over a point; at the same time Barack Obama defeated Mitt Romney by 6.7%, becoming the only Republican in 2012 to win a Senate seat in a state that voted for Obama in the presidential election.

2012 United States Senate election in Nevada
Party	Candidate	Votes	%	±%
Republican	Dean Heller (incumbent)	457,656	45.87	–9.49
Democratic	Shelley Berkley	446,080	44.71	+3.72
Independent American	David Lory VanDerBeek	48,792	4.89	+3.56
None of These Candidates		45,277	4.54	+3.12
Majority		11,576	1.16	–13.21
Total votes		997,805	100.0	
Republican hold		Swing	–6.60	

==== By county ====
County	Dean Heller Republican		Shelley Berkley Democratic		Various candidates Other parties		Margin		Total
County	#	%	#	%	#	%	#	%	Total
Carson City	13,488	58.3%	7,510	32.5%	2,135	9.2%	5,978	25.8%	23,133
Churchill	7,069	69.6%	2,013	19.8%	1,081	10.6%	5,056	49.8%	10,163
Clark	277,459	40.9%	338,629	50.0%	61,604	9.1%	-61,170	-9.1%	677,692
Douglas	16,644	64.5%	6,952	27.0%	2,194	8.5%	9,692	37.5%	25,790
Elko	11,840	74.8%	2,653	16.8%	1,344	8.7%	9,187	58.0%	15,837
Esmeralda	308	71.0%	62	14.3%	64	14.8%	246	56.7%	434
Eureka	636	79.1%	87	10.8%	81	10.1%	549	68.3%	804
Humboldt	3,876	68.1%	1,124	19.8%	691	12.1%	2,752	48.3%	5,691
Lander	1,567	72.9%	361	16.8%	221	10.3%	1,206	56.1%	2,149
Lincoln	1,532	71.9%	347	16.3%	251	11.8%	1,185	55.6%	2,130
Lyon	13,703	64.4%	5,404	25.4%	2,166	10.2%	8,299	39.0%	21,273
Mineral	1,059	52.4%	612	30.3%	349	17.3%	447	22.1%	2,020
Nye	9,561	55.4%	5,267	30.5%	2,438	14.2%	4,294	24.9%	17,266
Pershing	1,194	64.3%	396	21.3%	268	14.5%	798	43.0%	1,858
Storey	1,375	59.5%	673	29.1%	262	11.3%	702	30.4%	2,310
Washoe	93,778	50.5%	73,164	39.4%	18,625	10.0%	20,614	11.1%	185,567
White Pine	2,567	69.6%	826	22.4%	295	8.0%	1,741	47.2%	3,688
Totals	457,656	45.9%	446,080	44.7%	94,069	9.4%	11,576	1.2%	997,805

Counties that flipped from Republican to Democratic

- Clark (largest municipality: Las Vegas)

==== By congressional district ====
Heller won two of four congressional districts.

District	Berkley	Heller	Representative
1st	58.57%	31.6%	Dina Titus
2nd	34.27%	55.83%	Mark Amodei
3rd	43.34%	47.93%	Joe Heck
4th	48.26%	42.38%	Steven Horsford

== See also ==
- 2012 United States Senate elections
- 2012 United States House of Representatives elections in Nevada
