= John Koontz =

American politician

11th Secretary of State of Nevada
- In office 1947–1973
- Governor: Vail Pittman; Charles H. Russell; Grant Sawyer; Paul Laxalt; Mike O'Callaghan
- Preceded by: Malcolm McEachin
- Succeeded by: William D. Swackhamer

Personal details
- Born: October 19, 1902 Goldfield, Nevada, U.S.
- Died: March 21, 1995 (aged 92)
- Political party: Democratic

John Koontz (October 19, 1902 – March 21, 1995) was an American politician who served as the Secretary of State of Nevada from 1947 to 1973. He was the longest-serving politician to hold this office, winning 7 successive elections. During his tenure, he established state archives and preserved all the valuable records.

Koontz was born on October 19, 1906, in Goldfield, Nevada, to Louis Kossuth and Ada Mae Koontz. He worked as a miner, a cowpuncher, and a grocery store clerk. He entered politics in 1934 when he was elected county recorder of Esmeralda County.

From 1958 to 1959, Koontz served as president of the National Association of Secretaries of State. He worked as a campaign manager for Mary Gojack and Harry Reid.

In 1973, he resigned from the office.

Koontz died on March 21, 1995.
