= William D. Swackhamer =

American politician

Member of the Nevada General Assembly for Eureka-Lander-Pershing
- In office November 1946 – November 1972

Secretary of State of Nevada
- In office 1973–1987
- Governor: Mike O'Callaghan; Robert List; Richard Bryan
- Preceded by: John Koontz
- Succeeded by: Frankie Sue Del Papa

Personal details
- Born: August 18, 1914 Winnemucca, Nevada, U.S.
- Died: July 10, 2008 (aged 93) Meridian, Idaho, U.S.
- Party: Democratic
- Spouse: Joyce Marie Swackhamer

William Delany "Swack" Swackhamer (August 18, 1914 – July 10, 2008), was an American politician who was a Democratic member of the Nevada General Assembly from 1946 to 1972. He was Speaker of the Assembly in 1957, 1958, 1965, and 1966. From 1967 to 1968, he served as Majority Leader of the Assembly. From 1973 to 1987, he served as Secretary of State of Nevada. He was a veteran of World War II with the United States Army Air Forces. He died after a stroke in 2008.

Political offices
Preceded by John Koontz	Secretary of State of Nevada; 1973–1987	Succeeded by Frankie Sue Del Papa
