= Cheryl Lau =

American politician

Secretary of State of Nevada
- In office January 3, 1991 – January 3, 1995
- Governor: Bob Miller
- Preceded by: Frankie Sue Del Papa
- Succeeded by: Dean Heller

Personal details
- Born: July 4, 1944 (age 82) Hawaii Territory
- Party: Republican

Cheryl Lau (born July 4, 1944) is an American former politician who served as the first Asian-American Republican Secretary of State of Nevada.

Rather than seek re-election, she ran unsuccessfully for the Republican nomination for the Nevada gubernatorial election, 1994, losing to Jim Gibbons.

Political offices
| Preceded by Frankie Sue Del Papa | Secretary of State of Nevada; 1991–1995 | Succeeded by Dean Heller |
