= 2010 United States House of Representatives elections in Nevada =

- November 2, 2010

All 3 Nevada seats to the United States House of Representatives
	Majority party	Minority party
Party	Republican	Democratic
Last election	1	2
Seats won	2	1
Seat change	▲1	▼1
Popular vote	357,369	317,835
Percentage	50.85%	45.22%
Swing	▲8.62%	▼5.13%

Republican
40–50%
50–60%
60–70%
70–80%
80–90%
Democratic
50–60%
60–70%

The 2010 House elections in Nevada occurred on November 2, 2010, to elect the members of the State of Nevada's delegation to the United States House of Representatives. Representatives are elected for two-year terms; the elected served in the 112th Congress from January 3, 2011, until January 3, 2013. Nevada has three seats in the House, apportioned according to the 2000 United States census.

These elections were held concurrently with other Nevada elections, including the U.S. Senate, gubernatorial, and various other state and local elections.

== Overview ==
=== Statewide ===
Party	Candidates	Votes		Seats		
Party	Candidates	No.	%	No.	+/–	%
Republican	3	357,369	50.85	2	Steady	66.67
Democratic	3	317,835	45.22	1	Steady	33.33
Independent American	3	14,967	2.13	0	Steady	0.0
Independent	1	6,473	0.92	0	Steady	0.0
Libertarian	2	6,144	0.87	0	Steady	0.0
Total	12	702,788	100.0	3	Steady	100.0

Popular vote
Republican	50.85%
Democratic	45.22%
Independent American	2.13%
Libertarian	0.87%
Other	0.92%

House seats
Republican	66.67%
Democratic	33.33%

=== By district ===
Results of the 2010 United States House of Representatives elections in Nevada by district:

District	Republican		Democratic		Others		Total		Result
District	Votes	%	Votes	%	Votes	%	Votes	%	Result
District 1	58,995	35.28%	103,246	61.75%	4,965	2.97%	167,206	100.0%	Democratic Hold
District 2	169,458	63.30%	87,421	32.66%	10,829	4.04%	267,708	100.0%	Republican Hold
District 3	128,916	48.13%	127,168	47.47%	11,790	4.40%	267,874	100.0%	Republican Gain
Total	357,369	50.85%	317,835	45.22%	27,584	3.93%	702,788	100.0%	

== District 1 ==
2010 Nevada's 1st congressional district election
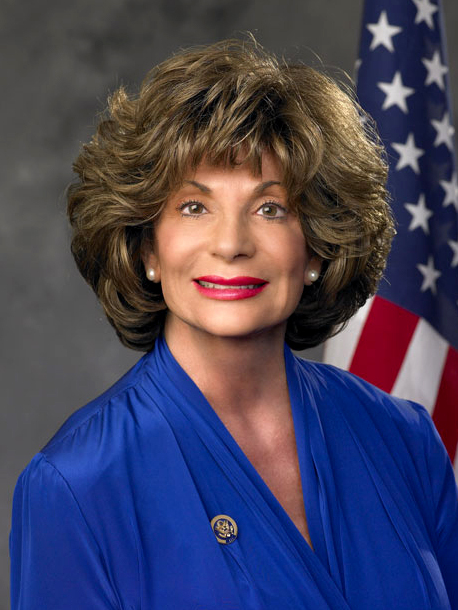

Nominee	Shelley Berkley	Kenneth Wegner
Party	Democratic	Republican
Popular vote	103,246	58,995
Percentage	61.7%	35.3%
- County results Berkley: 60–70%
U.S. Representative before election
Shelley Berkley
Democratic
Elected U.S. Representative
Shelley Berkley
Democratic

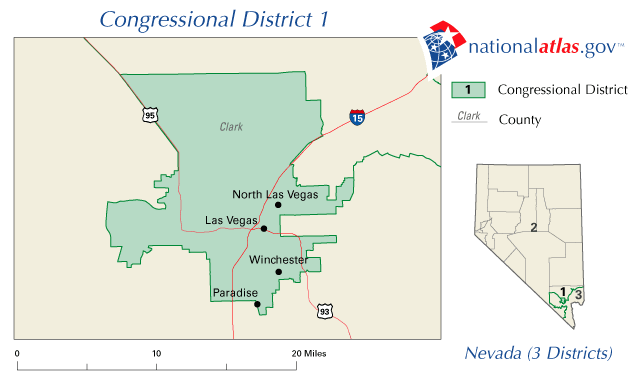

This district covered most of the City of Las Vegas, as well as parts of North Las Vegas and parts of unincorporated Clark County. Incumbent Democrat Shelley Berkley, who had represented the district since 1999, ran for re-election. She was re–elected with 67.6% of the vote in 2008 and the district had a PVI of D+10.

=== Democratic primary ===
==== Candidates ====
===== Nominee =====
- Shelley Berkley, incumbent U.S. Representative

=== Republican primary ===
Fiore had originally filed to challenge of incumbent state senator Dennis Nolan in the Republican primary, however on the March 12 filing deadline, she switched to run for congress with the open support of the national party.

==== Candidates ====
===== Nominee =====
- Kenneth Wegner, Gulf War veteran, part-time bail enforcement agent, candidate for the U.S. Senate in 2004, nominee for this seat in 2006 and 2008

===== Eliminated in primary =====
- David Cunningham, small business owner
- Michele Fiore, Health Care Company CEO
- Chuck Flume, businessman
- Craig Lake, small business owner
- Michael Monroe, handyman and candidate for this seat in 2006
- Scott Neistadt
- Joseph Tatner, writer and career coach

==== Results ====
Republican primary results
Party	Candidate	Votes	%
Republican	Kenneth Wegner	7,214	26.7
Republican	Michele Fiore	5,922	22.0
Republican	Craig Lake	5,277	19.6
Republican	Chuck Flume	4,318	16.0
Republican	David Cunningham	2,051	7.6
Republican	Joseph Tatner	1,293	4.8
Republican	Michael Monroe	456	1.7
Republican	Scott Neistadt	440	1.6
Total votes		26,971	100.0

=== Libertarian primary ===
==== Candidates ====
===== Nominee =====
- Edward Klapproth

=== Independent American primary ===
==== Candidates ====
===== Nominee =====
- Jonathon Hansen

=== General election ===
==== Campaign ====
Berkley faced Republican candidate Kenneth Wegner, her opponent from 2006 and 2008, but Berkley did not face much of a challenge from Wegner. Both the Las Vegas Review-Journal and the Las Vegas Sun endorsed Berkley in her bid for re-election, with the Sun praising her as a "tireless and diligent worker for her constituents," "a champion of seniors and veterans," and "an advocate for education."

==== Endorsements ====
Shelley Berkley (D)

Newspapers

- Las Vegas Review-Journal
- Las Vegas Sun

==== Predictions ====
Source	Ranking	As of
The Cook Political Report	Safe D	November 1, 2010
Rothenberg	Safe D	November 1, 2010
Sabato's Crystal Ball	Safe D	November 1, 2010
RCP	Safe D	November 1, 2010
CQ Politics	Safe D	October 28, 2010
New York Times	Safe D	November 1, 2010
FiveThirtyEight	Safe D	November 1, 2010

==== Results ====
Nevada's 1st congressional district election, 2010
Party	Candidate	Votes	%
Democratic	Shelley Berkley (incumbent)	103,246	61.7
Republican	Kenneth Wegner	58,995	35.3
Independent American	Jonathon Hansen	2,847	1.7
Libertarian	Edward Klapproth	2,118	1.3
Majority		44,251	26.5
Total votes		167,206	100.00
Democratic hold			

== District 2 ==
2006 Nevada's 2nd congressional district election
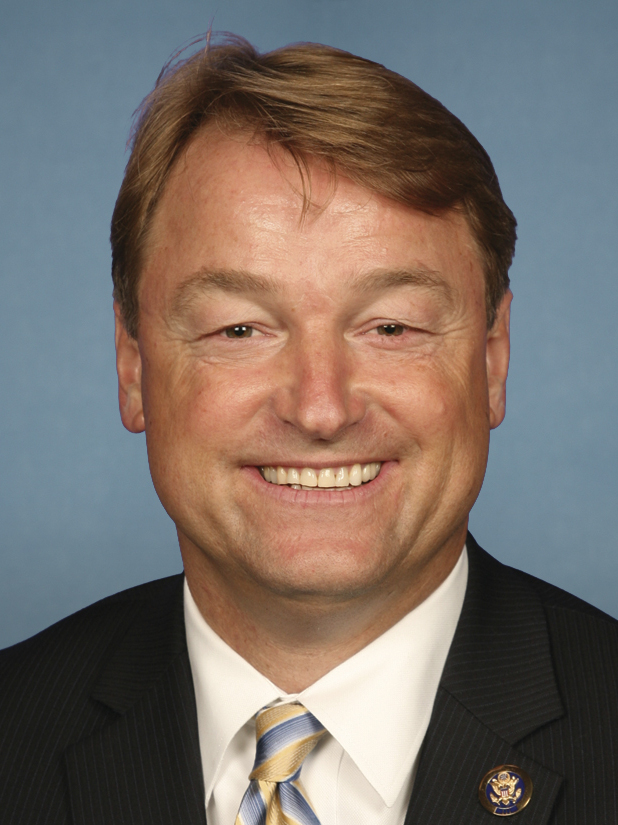

Nominee	Dean Heller	Nancy Price
Party	Republican	Democratic
Popular vote	169,458	87,421
Percentage	63.3%	32.7%
- County results Heller: 50–60% 60–70% 70–80% 80–90%
U.S. Representative before election
Dean Heller
Republican
Elected U.S. Representative
Dean Heller
Republican

This district covered all of Nevada except for parts of Clark County. Reno, along with surrounding Washoe County, casts about 70% of the district's vote. The 2nd District had been represented by Republicans continuously since its creation. Incumbent Republican Dean Heller, who had represented the district since 2007, ran for re-election. He was re–elected with 51.8% of the vote in 2008 and the district had a PVI of R+5.

=== Republican primary ===
==== Candidates ====
===== Nominee =====
- Dean Heller, incumbent U.S. Representative

===== Eliminated in primary =====
- Patrick Colletti, pediatrician

==== Results ====
Republican primary results
Party	Candidate	Votes	%
Republican	Dean Heller (incumbent)	72,728	83.7
Republican	Patrick Colletti	14,162	16.3
Total votes		86,890	100.0

=== Democratic primary ===
==== Candidates ====
===== Nominee =====
- Nancy Price, former regent of the Nevada System of Higher Education and U.S. Air Force veteran

===== Eliminated in primary =====
- Denis Dehne, retired pilot and activist
- Ken McKenna, attorney and member of the Nevada State Board of Education

===== Declined =====
- Jill Derby, chair of the Nevada Democratic Party, former Regent for the University and Community College System of Nevada, nominee for this seat in 2006 and 2008

==== Results ====
Democratic primary results
Party	Candidate	Votes	%
Democratic	Nancy Price	18,609	45.4
Democratic	Ken McKenna	18,259	44.5
Democratic	Denis Dehne	4,156	10.1
Total votes		26,245	100.0

=== Independent American primary ===
==== Candidates ====
===== Nominee =====
- Russell Best

=== General election ===
==== Campaign ====
Though Heller faced a close election in 2006 and a somewhat competitive election in 2008, his two-time Democratic opponent Jill Derby declined to run for a third time. Criticizing Price's "glowing" citations of Bernie Sanders, an openly socialist United States Senator and praising Congressman Heller's "core principles," the Las Vegas Review-Journal endorsed Heller in his bid for a third term.

==== Endorsements ====
Dean Heller (R)

Newspapers

- Las Vegas Review-Journal

==== Predictions ====
Source	Ranking	As of
The Cook Political Report	Safe R	November 1, 2010
Rothenberg	Safe R	November 1, 2010
Sabato's Crystal Ball	Safe R	November 1, 2010
RCP	Safe R	November 1, 2010
CQ Politics	Safe R	October 28, 2010
New York Times	Safe R	November 1, 2010
FiveThirtyEight	Safe R	November 1, 2010

==== Results ====
On election day, Heller won by a large margin, as expected.

Nevada's 2nd congressional district election, 2010
Party	Candidate	Votes	%
Republican	Dean Heller (incumbent)	169,458	63.3
Democratic	Nancy Price	87,421	32.7
Independent American	Russell Best	10,829	4.0
Majority		82,037	30.6
Total votes		267,708	100.0
Republican hold			

== District 3 ==
2010 Nevada's 3rd congressional district election
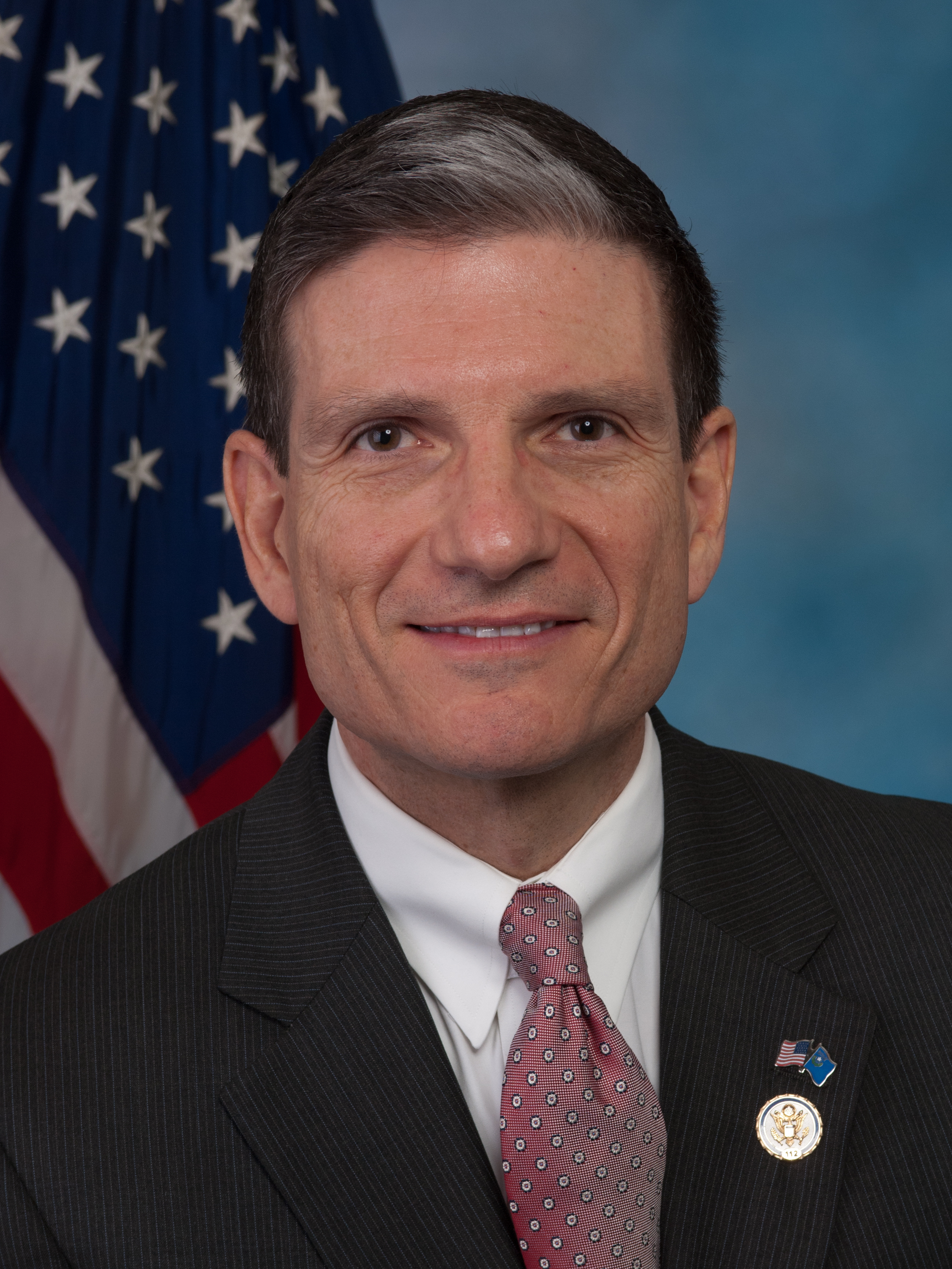

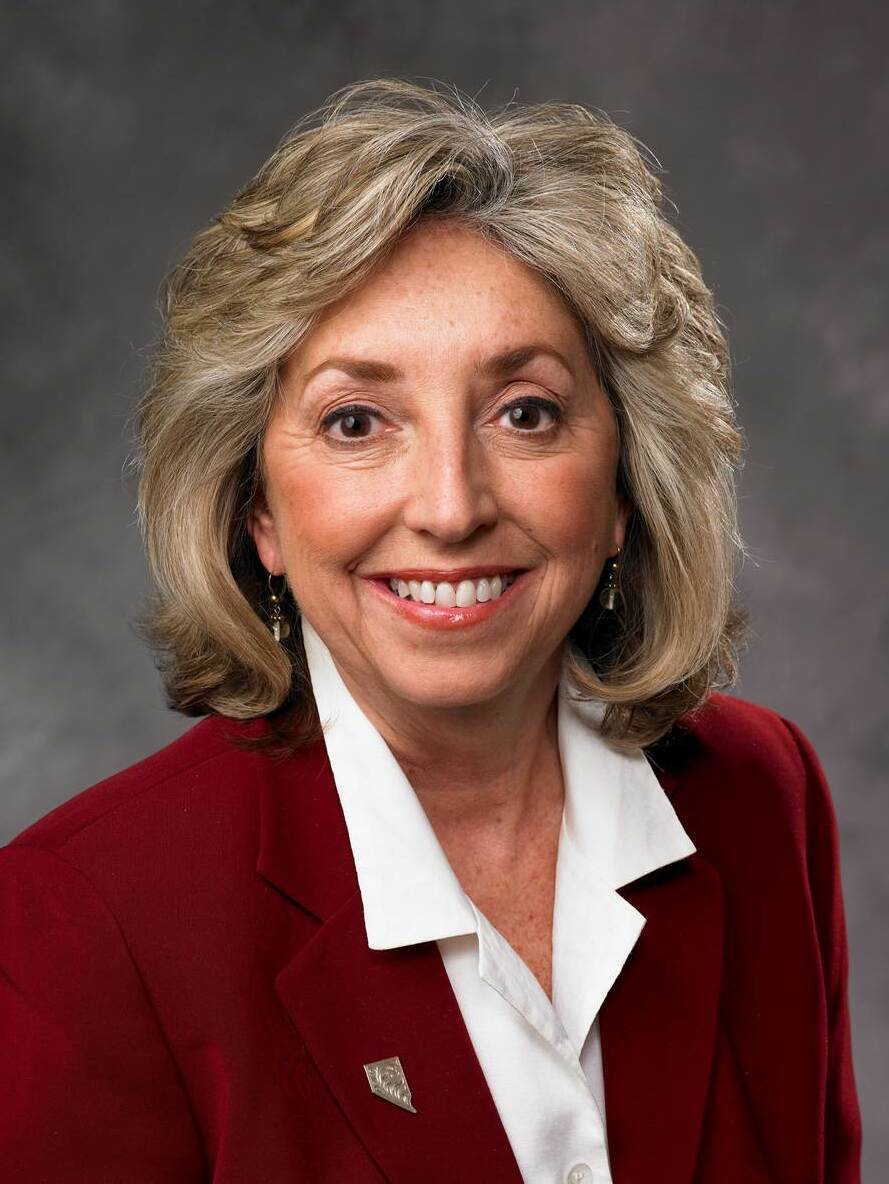
Nominee	Joe Heck	Dina Titus
Party	Republican	Democratic
Popular vote	128,916	127,168
Percentage	48.1%	47.5%
- County results Heck: 40–50%
U.S. Representative before election
Dina Titus
Democratic
Elected U.S. Representative
Joe Heck
Republican

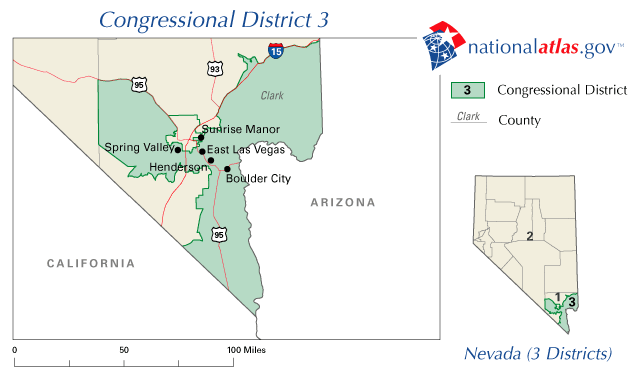

This district covered the suburbs of Las Vegas, including Henderson, parts of North Las Vegas and Summerlin, and much of unincorporated Clark County. Incumbent Democratic Dina Titus, who had represented the district since 2009, ran for re-election. She was elected with 47.4% of the vote in 2008 and the district had a PVI of D+2.

=== Democratic primary ===
==== Candidates ====
===== Nominee =====
- Dina Titus, incumbent U.S. Representative and nominee for Governor in 2006

===== Eliminated in primary =====
- John Beard, retired small–businessman

==== Results ====
Democratic primary results
Party	Candidate	Votes	%
Democratic	Dina Titus (incumbent)	32,119	80.4
Democratic	John Beard	7,846	19.6
Total votes		39,965	100.0

=== Republican primary ===
==== Candidates ====
===== Nominee =====
- Joe Heck, former state senator

===== Eliminated in primary =====
- Ed Bridges, tea party activist and insurance agent
- Brad Leutwyler, University of Nevada, Las Vegas professor
- Steve Nohrden, realtor

===== Withdrawn =====
- John Guedry, former City National Bank executive
- Rob Lauer, real estate investor

===== Declined =====
- Brian Scroggins, businessman and former Clark County Republican Party chair

==== Results ====
Republican primary results
Party	Candidate	Votes	%
Republican	Joe Heck	36,898	68.8
Republican	Steve Nohrden	8,853	16.5
Republican	Ed Bridges	6,066	11.3
Republican	Brad Leutwyler	1,812	3.4
Total votes		53,629	100.0

=== Libertarian primary ===
==== Candidates ====
===== Nominee =====
- Joseph Silvestri, teacher, realtor, nominee for this seat in 2004, 2006 and 2008

=== Independent American primary ===
==== Candidates ====
===== Nominee =====
- Scott Narter

=== General election ===
==== Campaign ====
Throughout the campaign, the two candidates argued over the effectiveness of the 2009 Stimulus, how the health care reform bill would affect small businesses, and whether Democratic control of the government has helped or hurt the country.

The Las Vegas Review-Journal strongly criticized Congresswoman Titus for being "a Keynesian to the core" and for believing "government simply isn't spending enough to ensure our prosperity" and praised Republican challenger Heck for bringing "to the office the kind of perspective the House badly needs," endorsing Heck over Titus. The Sun, on the other hand, endorsed Titus, citing her "active and visible" profile and her work to "marshal federal support" to "homeowners hit hard by the economic crisis" as reasons for their endorsement.

==== Endorsements ====
Dina Titus (D)

Newspapers

- Las Vegas Sun
Joe Heck (R)

Newspapers

- Las Vegas Review-Journal

==== Polling ====
Poll source	Date(s) administered	Sample size (Note: Key: A – all adults RV – registered voters LV – likely voters V – unclear)	Margin of error	Dina Titus (D)	Joe Heck (R)	Barry Michaels (I)	Other	Undecided
Mason-Dixon (Las Vegas Review-Journal)	October 25–27, 2010	400 (LV)	±5.0%	43%	53%	–	1%	3%
OnMessage Inc. (R)	October 21–24, 2010	?	±4.9%	42%	49%	–	3%	6%
The Hill/ANGA	September 25–27, 2010	403 (LV)	±4.9%	44%	47%	–	–	6%
Mason-Dixon (Las Vegas Review-Journal)	September 7–9, 2010	400 (LV)	±5.0%	47%	43%	–	1%	9%
Ayres, McHenry & Associates (American Action Forum)	August 23–24, 2010	400 (V)	±4.9%	45%	48%	–	–	7%
Mason-Dixon (Las Vegas Review-Journal)	August 9–11, 2010	400 (LV)	±5.0%	43%	42%	–	3%	12%
Mason-Dixon (Las Vegas Review-Journal)	July 12–14, 2010	400 (LV)	±5.0%	42%	40%	–	5%	13%
Mason-Dixon (Las Vegas Review-Journal)	April 5–7, 2010	300 (LV)	±6.0%	44%	49%	–	–	7%
Wilson Research Strategies	March 24–25, 2010	?	±4.9%	35%	40%	7%	–	18%
Mason-Dixon (Las Vegas Review-Journal)	November 30 – December 2, 2009	300 (RV)	±6.0%	40%	40%	–	–	20%

==== Predictions ====
Source	Ranking	As of
The Cook Political Report	Lean R (flip)	November 1, 2010
Rothenberg	Tilt R (flip)	November 1, 2010
Sabato's Crystal Ball	Lean R (flip)	November 1, 2010
RCP	Lean R (flip)	November 1, 2010
CQ Politics	Lean R (flip)	October 28, 2010
New York Times	Tossup	November 1, 2010
FiveThirtyEight	Safe R (flip)	November 1, 2010

==== Results ====
Even though polling showed Heck with a lead over the incumbent Titus, it was a surprisingly close race, and Heck eked into Congress with less than a one percent and 1,700 vote margin of victory.

Nevada's 3rd congressional district election, 2010
Party	Candidate	Votes	%
Republican	Joe Heck	128,916	48.1
Democratic	Dina Titus (incumbent)	127,168	47.5
Independent	Barry Michaels	6,473	2.4
Libertarian	Joseph Silvestri	4,026	1.5
Independent American	Scott Narter	1,291	0.5
Majority		1,748	0.7
Total votes		267,874	100.0
Republican gain from Democratic			
