= Frankie Sue Del Papa =

American politician (born 1949)

29th Attorney General of Nevada
- In office January 7, 1991 – January 6, 2003
- Governor: Bob Miller; Kenny Guinn
- Preceded by: Brian McKay
- Succeeded by: Brian Sandoval

13th Secretary of State of Nevada
- In office January 5, 1987 – January 7, 1991
- Governor: Richard Bryan; Bob Miller
- Preceded by: William D. Swackhamer
- Succeeded by: Cheryl Lau

Personal details
- Born: September 21, 1949 (age 77)
- Party: Democratic
- Education: George Washington University; University of Nevada, Reno
- Profession: Attorney and politician

Frankie Sue Del Papa (born September 21, 1949) is an American attorney and politician in the state of Nevada. She was the first woman elected as the Secretary of State of Nevada in 1986 and the first woman elected as the Nevada Attorney General, a position that she held between 1991 and 2003.

== Early life ==
Del Papa earned a bachelors of arts degree from the University of Nevada, Reno, in 1971 and graduated from George Washington University Law School with a J.D. in 1974. She was the third woman elected as student body president at the University of Nevada, Reno. She was an associate at the law office of Lesley B. Gray in Reno, Nevada, between 1975 and 1978, a partner at the law offices of Thornton and Del Papa between 1979 and 1984, and worked in private practice in Reno between 1984 and 1987.

== Political career ==
She was the first woman elected as the Secretary of State of Nevada in the 1986 general election and the first woman elected as the Nevada Attorney General, winning the 1990 general election, the 1994 general election, and the 1998 general election. Del Papa was not eligible to run for a fourth term in 2002 due to lifetime term limits established by the Nevada Constitution. She ran for Governor of Nevada in 1998 and for U.S. Senate in 1999 but dropped out of both elections due to lack of funds.

After retiring from politics, she served as the co-chair of Hillary Clinton’s 2008 presidential campaign in Nevada. Currently, she sits on the bipartisan advisory board of the States United Democracy Center.

== Partial works ==
- An oral history of the Nevada's Womens Conference (1977)
- Nevada procedures and forms for filings under Article 9, parts 1 and 4 of the Uniform Commercial Code, effective July 1, 1987 (1988)
- Political history of Nevada (1990)
- Investigation regarding possible criminal activities in ticket distribution at the University of Nevada, Las Vegas Athletic Department (1991)
- Administrative rulemaking : a procedural guide (1995)
- Elder abuse : an action plan to better protect Nevada's elderly (1997)
- Nevada's guidelines and procedures for community notification of ... sex offenders (1998)
- Guide for mandated reporters of elder abuse (1999)
- Guide for nonprofit organizations (1999)
- Nevada board and commission manual (1999)
- Nevada open meeting law manual (2001)

== See also ==
- List of female state attorneys general in the United States

Political offices
Preceded by William D. Swackhamer	Secretary of State of Nevada; January 5, 1987 – January 7, 1991	Succeeded by Cheryl Lau
Legal offices
Preceded by Brian McKay	Attorney General of Nevada; January 7, 1991 – January 6, 2003	Succeeded by Brian Sandoval
