= Brian McKay =

American politician

31st Attorney General of Nevada
- In office January 3, 1983 – January 7, 1991
- Preceded by: Richard Bryan
- Succeeded by: Frankie Sue Del Papa

Personal details
- Born: 1945 (age 80–81)
- Party: Republican
- Education: Colgate University; Albany Law School (JD)

Brian McKay is an American attorney and politician who served as the 28th Nevada Attorney General from 1983 to 1991. McKay also served as chairman of the Nevada Republican Party from 1992 to 1995.

== Early life and education ==
Mckay was born in Billings, Montana, in 1945. He served in the United States Air Force from 1966 to 1969. After his discharge, McKay attended Colgate University, graduating in 1971, and received a Juris Doctor from the Albany Law School in 1974.

== Career ==
After law school, McKay became a Deputy Attorney General, working there for four years. McKay represented the Colorado River Commission, served as Chief Legal Counsel to the Nevada Equal Rights Commission, and was special counsel for the University of Nevada.

McKay joined the Advisory Policy Board of the National Crime Information Center in 1985, serving three terms.

McKay was elected Nevada's Attorney General in 1982, defeating Democrat B. Mahlon Brownn the former U.S. attorney for Nevada. McKay was re-elected in 1986 against Clark County District Attorney Roy A. Woofter.

During his first Christmas as Attorney General, McKay issued an advisory opinion in response to questions by Nevada children and confirmed that Santa Clause is indeed real.

In April 1987, McKay represented Nevada at the United States Supreme Court in Sumner v. Shuman, in which the court held that a death sentence cannot be mandatory.

After leaving office, McKay served as a member of the Federal Trade Commission and as the chair of the Nevada Republican Party from 1992 to 1995. As chairman, McKay filed complaints against the Nevada Democratic Party with the FEC for financial disclosure violations.

Legal offices
| Preceded by Richard Bryan | Attorney General of Nevada; January 3, 1983 – January 7, 1991 | Succeeded by Frankie Sue Del Papa |
