= Nevada's 2nd congressional district =

U.S. House district for Nevada

Coordinates: 40°39′04″N 117°19′47″W

- Interactive map of district boundaries since January 3, 2023. Points indicate major cities in the district with a population over 50,000, ordered by population (Reno, Sparks, and Carson City).
- Representative: Mark Amodei; R–Carson City
- Population (2025): 808,038
- Median household income: $92,009
- Ethnicity: 62.8% White; 23.1% Hispanic; 5.1% Two or more races; 4.2% Asian; 1.9% Black; 1.7% Native American; 1.0% other
- Cook PVI: R+7

Nevada's 2nd congressional district is a congressional district that includes the northern half of the state of Nevada. It includes most of Lyon County, a small portion of Lincoln County, all of Churchill, Douglas, Elko, Eureka, Humboldt, Lander, Pershing, Storey, Washoe, and White Pine counties, as well as the state capital, Carson City. The largest city in the district is Reno, the state's third largest city. Although the district appears rural, its politics are dominated by Reno and Carson City. As of 2017, over 460,000 people reside in Washoe County alone, totaling about two-thirds of the district's population. It is the richest congressional district in the state of Nevada. With a Cook Partisan Voting Index rating of R+7, it is the only Republican-leaning congressional district in Nevada.

== Political history ==
The district was initially created after the redistricting cycle after the 1980 census, when Nevada was split into districts for the first time. From then until 2013, it occupied all of the state outside of Clark County. From 1993 to 2013, it also included the far northern portion of Clark County. Until 2013, it was the third-largest congressional district by land area that did not cover an entire state. Even though it lost much of its southern portion to the new 4th District after the 2010 census, it is still the fifth-largest district in the nation that does not cover an entire state.

For the first four decades of its existence, the district tilted Republican, and its first four members were all Republicans. From 1983 to 2024, Democrats only made four serious bids for the seat. In presidential elections, the district has historically voted Republican; George W. Bush won the district by 20 points in 2000 and 16 points in 2004. However, in the 2008 election John McCain earned only 88 votes more (out of 335,720 votes) than Barack Obama in the district.

The Republican trend continued even as Washoe County swung to the Democrats at the turn of the millennium. Washoe County has supported the Democratic candidate at every presidential election since 2008. However, most Democratic support in that county is concentrated in Reno and Sparks. The more rural portions of Washoe, as well as Carson City and the more thinly populated counties, are still powerfully Republican.

On April 21, 2011, U.S. Senator John Ensign (R-Nev.), plagued by scandal and facing an inquiry by the Senate Ethics Committee, announced his resignation effective May 3. On April 27, Governor Brian Sandoval announced he would appoint Dean Heller, the 2nd district's third-term congressman, to fill out Ensign's term in the Senate. Heller had already planned to run for the seat after Ensign announced a month earlier that he would not run for a third term. To fill the vacancy created by Heller's resignation on May 9, Sandoval was required to call a special election to be held within six months of the occurrence of the vacancy.

A special election was held on September 13, 2011. Former Republican state senator Mark Amodei defeated Democratic State Treasurer Kate Marshall.

Amodei retired in 2026, and former state assembly majority leader Teresa Benitez-Thompson became the first Democrat to win the seat.

== Recent election results from statewide races ==
Year	Office	Results
2008	President	McCain 48.79%–48.76%
2010	Senate	Angle 54%–46%
2010	Governor	Sandoval 66%–34%
2010	Secretary of State	Miller 53%–47%
2010	Treasurer	Martin 53%–47%
2012	President	Romney 55%–45%
2016	President	Trump 53%–39%
2016	Senate	Heck 53%–39%
2018	Senate	Heller 54%–42%
2018	Governor	Laxalt 54%–41%
2018	Lt. Governor	Roberson 50%–44%
2018	Secretary of State	Cegavske 56%–41%
2018	Treasurer	Beers 55%–39%
2018	Attorney General	Duncan 55%–38%
2020	President	Trump 54%–43%
2022	Senate	Laxalt 54%–43%
2022	Governor	Lombardo 55%–41%
2022	Lt. Governor	Anthony 55%–39%
2022	Secretary of State	Marchant 52%–43%
2022	Treasurer	Fiore 53%–41%
2022	Controller	Matthews 57%–39%
2022	Attorney General	Chattah 48.3%–47.5%
2024	President	Trump 56%–42%
2024	Senate	Brown 51%–43%

== Composition ==
For the 118th and successive Congresses (based on redistricting following the 2020 census), the district contains all or portions of the following counties and communities:

Churchill County (2)

Fallon, Fallon Station

Douglas County (21)

All 21 communities

Elko County (12)

All 12 communities

Eureka County (2)

Crescent Valley, Eureka

Humboldt County (8)

All 8 communities

Independent cities (1)

Carson City

Lander County (3)

All 3 communities

Lincoln County (0)

Contains unincorporated area of Lincoln County

Lyon County (7)

Dayton, Fernley, Silver City, Silver Springs, Smith Valley (part; also 4th), Stagecoach, Yerington

Pershing County (6)

All 6 communities

Storey County (5)

All 5 communities

Washoe County (17)

All 17 communities

White Pine County (6)

All 6 communities

== List of members representing the district ==
Member (Residency)	Party	Years	Cong ress	Electoral history	District location
District established January 3, 1983
Barbara Vucanovich (Reno)	Republican	January 3, 1983 – January 3, 1997	98th 99th 100th 101st 102nd 103rd 104th	Elected in 1982. Re-elected in 1984. Re-elected in 1986. Re-elected in 1988. Re-elected in 1990. Re-elected in 1992. Re-elected in 1994. Retired.	1983–1993; Carson City, Churchill, Douglas, Elko, Esmeralda, Eureka, Humboldt, Lander, Lincoln, Lyon, Mineral, Nye, Pershing, Storey, Washoe, and White Pine; part of Clark
Barbara Vucanovich (Reno)	Republican	January 3, 1983 – January 3, 1997	98th 99th 100th 101st 102nd 103rd 104th	Elected in 1982. Re-elected in 1984. Re-elected in 1986. Re-elected in 1988. Re-elected in 1990. Re-elected in 1992. Re-elected in 1994. Retired.	1993–2003; Carson City, Churchill, Douglas, Elko, Esmeralda, Eureka, Humboldt, Lander, Lincoln, Lyon, Mineral, Nye, Pershing, Storey, Washoe, and White Pine; part of Clark
Jim Gibbons (Reno)	Republican	January 3, 1997 – December 31, 2006	105th 106th 107th 108th 109th	Elected in 1996. Re-elected in 1998. Re-elected in 2000. Re-elected in 2002. Re-elected in 2004. Resigned after elected Governor of Nevada.	1993–2003; Carson City, Churchill, Douglas, Elko, Esmeralda, Eureka, Humboldt, Lander, Lincoln, Lyon, Mineral, Nye, Pershing, Storey, Washoe, and White Pine; part of Clark
Jim Gibbons (Reno)	Republican	January 3, 1997 – December 31, 2006	105th 106th 107th 108th 109th	Elected in 1996. Re-elected in 1998. Re-elected in 2000. Re-elected in 2002. Re-elected in 2004. Resigned after elected Governor of Nevada.	2003–2013 Carson City, Churchill, Douglas, Elko, Esmeralda, Eureka, Humboldt, Lander, Lincoln, Lyon, Mineral, Nye, Pershing, Storey, Washoe, and White Pine; part of Clark
Vacant		December 31, 2006 – January 3, 2007	109th		2003–2013 Carson City, Churchill, Douglas, Elko, Esmeralda, Eureka, Humboldt, Lander, Lincoln, Lyon, Mineral, Nye, Pershing, Storey, Washoe, and White Pine; part of Clark
Dean Heller (Carson City)	Republican	January 3, 2007 – May 9, 2011	110th 111th 112th	Elected in 2006. Re-elected in 2008. Re-elected in 2010. Resigned when appointed U.S. senator.	2003–2013 Carson City, Churchill, Douglas, Elko, Esmeralda, Eureka, Humboldt, Lander, Lincoln, Lyon, Mineral, Nye, Pershing, Storey, Washoe, and White Pine; part of Clark
Vacant		May 9, 2011 – September 13, 2011	112th		2003–2013 Carson City, Churchill, Douglas, Elko, Esmeralda, Eureka, Humboldt, Lander, Lincoln, Lyon, Mineral, Nye, Pershing, Storey, Washoe, and White Pine; part of Clark
Mark Amodei (Carson City)	Republican	September 13, 2011 – present	112th 113th 114th 115th 116th 117th 118th 119th	Elected to finish Heller's term. Re-elected in 2012. Re-elected in 2014. Re-elected in 2016. Re-elected in 2018. Re-elected in 2020. Re-elected in 2022. Re-elected in 2024. Retiring at end of term.	2003–2013 Carson City, Churchill, Douglas, Elko, Esmeralda, Eureka, Humboldt, Lander, Lincoln, Lyon, Mineral, Nye, Pershing, Storey, Washoe, and White Pine; part of Clark
Mark Amodei (Carson City)	Republican	September 13, 2011 – present	112th 113th 114th 115th 116th 117th 118th 119th	Elected to finish Heller's term. Re-elected in 2012. Re-elected in 2014. Re-elected in 2016. Re-elected in 2018. Re-elected in 2020. Re-elected in 2022. Re-elected in 2024. Retiring at end of term.	2013–2023 Carson City, Churchill, Douglas, Elko, Eureka, Humboldt, Lander, Pershing, Storey, and Washoe; part of Lyon
Mark Amodei (Carson City)	Republican	September 13, 2011 – present	112th 113th 114th 115th 116th 117th 118th 119th	Elected to finish Heller's term. Re-elected in 2012. Re-elected in 2014. Re-elected in 2016. Re-elected in 2018. Re-elected in 2020. Re-elected in 2022. Re-elected in 2024. Retiring at end of term.	2023–present Carson City, Douglas, Elko, Eureka, Humboldt, Lander, Pershing, Storey, Washoe, and White Pine; parts of Churchill, Lincoln, and Lyon
Teresa Benitez-Thompson (Reno)	Democratic	Taking office on January 3, 2027		Elected in 2026.	2023–present Carson City, Douglas, Elko, Eureka, Humboldt, Lander, Pershing, Storey, Washoe, and White Pine; parts of Churchill, Lincoln, and Lyon

== Election results ==
=== 1982 ===
1982 election
Party	Candidate	Votes	%
Republican	Barbara Vucanovich	70,188	55.49
Democratic	Mary Gojack	52,265	41.32
Libertarian	Teresa Vuceta	4,043	3.20
Total votes		126,496	100.0
Republican win (new seat)			

=== 1984 ===
1984 election
Party	Candidate	Votes	%
Republican	Barbara Vucanovich (Incumbent)	99,775	71.21
Democratic	Andrew Barbano	36,130	25.79
Libertarian	Dan Becan	4,201	3.00
Total votes		140,106	100.0
Republican hold			

=== 1986 ===
1986 election
Party	Candidate	Votes	%
Republican	Barbara Vucanovich (Incumbent)	83,479	58.41
Democratic	Pete Sferrazza	59,433	41.59
Total votes		142,912	100.0
Republican hold			

=== 1988 ===
1988 election
Party	Candidate	Votes	%
Republican	Barbara Vucanovich (Incumbent)	105,981	57.26
Democratic	Jim Spoo	75,163	40.61
Libertarian	Kent Cromwell	3,953	2.14
Total votes		185,097	100.0
Republican hold			

=== 1990 ===
1990 election
Party	Candidate	Votes	%
Republican	Barbara Vucanovich (Incumbent)	103,508	59.08
Democratic	Jane Wisdom	59,581	34.01
Libertarian	Dan Becan	12,120	6.92
Total votes		175,209	100.0
Republican hold			

=== 1992 ===
1992 election
Party	Candidate	Votes	%
Republican	Barbara Vucanovich (Incumbent)	129,575	47.91
Democratic	Pete Sferrazza	117,199	43.33
Independent American	Daniel M. Hansen	13,285	4.91
Libertarian	Dan Becan	7,552	2.79
Populist	Don Golden	2,850	1.05
Total votes		270,461	100.0
Republican hold			

=== 1994 ===
1994 election
Party	Candidate	Votes	%
Republican	Barbara Vucanovich (Incumbent)	142,202	63.50
Democratic	Janet Greeson	65,390	29.20
Independent American	Thomas F. Jefferson	9,615	4.29
Natural Law	Lois Avery	6,725	3.00
Total votes		223,932	100.0
Republican hold			

=== 1996 ===
1996 election
Party	Candidate	Votes	%
Republican	Jim Gibbons	162,310	58.56
Democratic	Thomas "Spike" Wilson	97,942	35.26
Independent American	Daniel M. Hansen	8,780	3.17
Natural Law	Lois Avery	4,628	1.67
Libertarian	Louis R. Tomburello	3,732	1.35
Total votes		277,192	100.0
Republican hold			

=== 1998 ===
1998 election
Party	Candidate	Votes	%
Republican	Jim Gibbons (Incumbent)	201,623	81.05
Independent American	Christopher Horne	20,738	8.34
Libertarian	Louis R. Tomburello	18,561	7.46
Natural Law	Robert W. Winquist	7,841	3.15
Total votes		248,763	100.0
Republican hold			

=== 2000 ===
2000 election
Party	Candidate	Votes	%
Republican	Jim Gibbons (Incumbent)	229,608	64.50
Democratic	Tierney Cahill	106,379	29.88
Independent American	Daniel M. Hansen	5,582	1.57
Green	A. Charles Laws	5,547	1.56
Libertarian	Terry Savage	5,343	1.50
Citizens First	Ken Brenneman	2,367	0.66
Natural Law	Robert W. Winquist	1,143	0.32
Total votes		355,969	100.0
Republican hold			

=== 2002 ===
2002 election
Party	Candidate	Votes	%
Republican	Jim Gibbons (Incumbent)	149,574	74.34
Democratic	Travis O. Souza	40,189	19.97
Independent American	Janine Hansen	7,240	3.60
Libertarian	Brendan Trainor	3,413	1.70
Natural Law	Robert W. Winquist	784	0.39
Total votes		201,200	100.0
Republican hold			

=== 2004 ===
2004 election
Party	Candidate	Votes	%
Republican	Jim Gibbons (Incumbent)	195,466	67.15
Democratic	Angie G. Cochran	79,978	27.48
Independent American	Janine Hansen	10,638	3.65
Libertarian	Brendan Trainor	4,997	1.72
Total votes		291,079	100.0
Republican hold			

=== 2006 ===
2006 election
Party	Candidate	Votes	%
Republican	Dean Heller	117,168	50.35
Democratic	Jill Derby	104,593	44.94
Independent	Daniel Rosen	5,524	2.37
Independent American	James C. Kroshus	5,439	2.34
Total votes		232,724	100.0
Republican hold			

=== 2008 ===
2008 election
Party	Candidate	Votes	%
Republican	Dean Heller (Incumbent)	170,771	51.82
Democratic	Jill Derby	136,548	41.44
Independent American	John Everhart	11,179	3.39
Libertarian	Sean Patrick Morse	5,740	1.74
Green	Craig Bergland	5,282	1.60
Total votes		329,520	100.0
Republican hold			

=== 2010 ===
2010 election
Party	Candidate	Votes	%
Republican	Dean Heller (Incumbent)	169,458	63.30
Democratic	Nancy Price	87,421	32.66
Independent American	Russell Best	10,829	4.05
Total votes		267,708	100.0
Republican hold			

=== 2011 (special) ===
2011 special election
Party	Candidate	Votes	%
Republican	Mark Amodei	75,180	57.92
Democratic	Kate Marshall	46,818	36.07
Independent	Helmuth Lehmann	5,372	4.14
Independent American	Timothy Fasano	2,421	1.87
Total votes		129,791	
Republican hold			

=== 2012 ===
2012 election
Party	Candidate	Votes	%
Republican	Mark Amodei (Incumbent)	162,213	57.63
Democratic	Samuel Koepnick	102,019	36.25
Independent American	Russell Best	6,051	2.15
Independent	Michael Haines	11,166	3.97
Total votes		281,499	100.0
Republican hold			

=== 2014 ===
2014 election
Party	Candidate	Votes	%
Republican	Mark Amodei (Incumbent)	122,402	65.73
Democratic	Kristen Spees	52,016	27.93
Independent American	Janine Hansen	11,792	6.33
Total votes		186,210	100.0
Republican hold			

=== 2016 ===
2016 election
Party	Candidate	Votes	%
Republican	Mark Amodei (Incumbent)	182,676	58.30
Democratic	H.D. "Chip" Evans	115,722	36.93
Independent American	John H. Everhart	8,693	2.77
Independent	Drew Knight	6,245	1.99
Total votes		313,336	100.0
Republican hold			

=== 2018 ===
2018 election
Party	Candidate	Votes	%
Republican	Mark Amodei (Incumbent)	167,435	58.2
Democratic	Clint Koble	120,102	41.8
Total votes		287,537	100.0
Republican hold			

=== 2020 ===
2020 election
Party	Candidate	Votes	%
Republican	Mark Amodei (incumbent)	216,078	56.5
Democratic	Patricia Ackerman	155,780	40.7
Independent American	Janine Hansen	10,815	2.8
Total votes		382,673	100.0
Republican hold			

=== 2022 ===
2022 election
Party	Candidate	Votes	%
Republican	Mark Amodei (incumbent)	185,467	59.7
Democratic	Elizabeth Mercedes Krause	117,371	37.8
Independent American	Russell Best	4,194	1.4
Libertarian	Darryl Baber	3,466	1.1
Total votes		310,678	100.0
Republican hold			

=== 2024 ===
2024 Nevada's 2nd congressional district election
Party	Candidate	Votes	%
Republican	Mark Amodei (incumbent)	219,919	55.0
Independent	Greg Kidd	144,064	36.1
Independent American	Lynn Chapman	19,784	4.9
Libertarian	Javi Tachiquin	15,817	4.0
Total votes		399,584	100.0
Republican hold			

=== 2026 ===
Nevada's 2nd Congressional District election (2026)
Party	Candidate	Votes	%
Democratic	Teresa Benitez-Thompson	152,120	50.0
Republican	David Flippo	135,760	44.6
Independent American	Lynn Chapman	16,451	5.4
Total votes		304,506	100.0
Democratic gain from Republican			

== Historical district boundaries ==
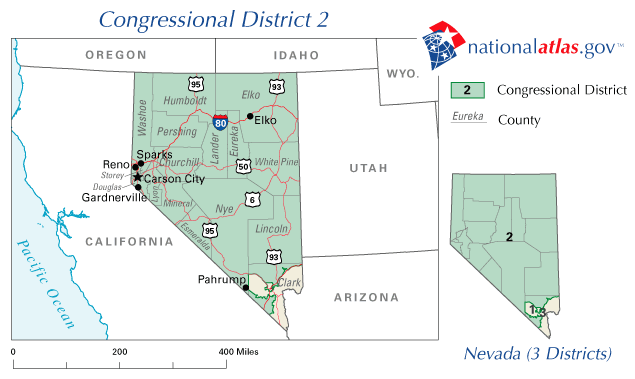
2003 – 2013

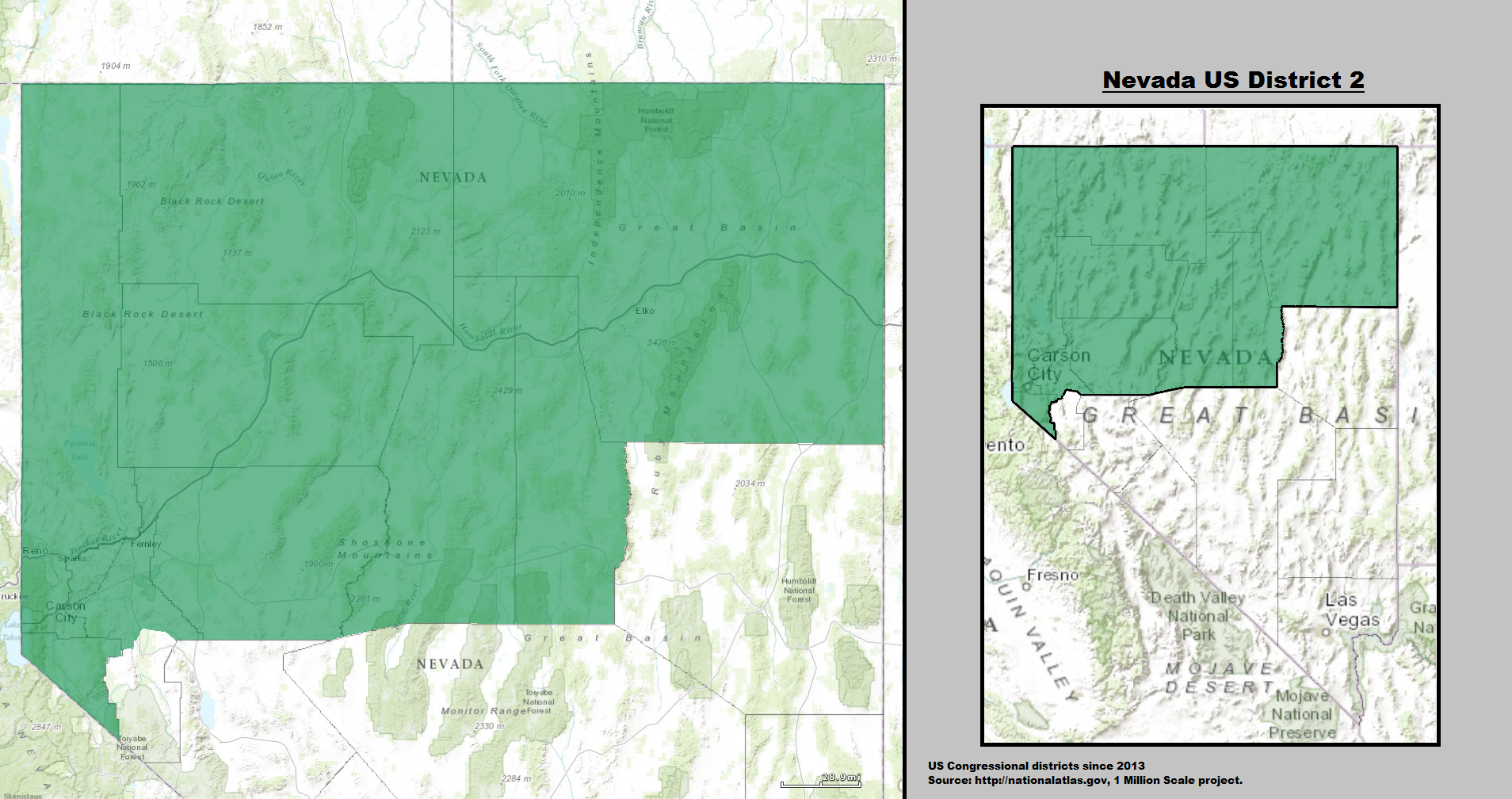
2013 – 2023

== See also ==
- Nevada's congressional districts
- List of United States congressional districts
