= Jill Derby =

American politician

Jill Talbot Derby

Chairwoman of the Nevada Democratic Party
- In office March 31, 2007 – February 20, 2008
- Preceded by: Tom Collins
- Succeeded by: Sam Lieberman

Personal details
- Party: Democratic
- Education: University of California (B.A.); University of Nevada (M.S.); University of California (Ph.D.)
- Profession: Educator

Jill Talbot Derby served from 1988 to 2006 as an elected Regent for the Nevada System of Higher Education, serving three terms as board chair. She ran as the Democratic candidate for the open seat of Nevada's 2nd congressional district in the 2006 election, losing but gaining national attention by making a normally heavily Republican district competitive. Following that, she served as the chairwoman of the Nevada Democratic Party from March, 2007 until February, 2008 overseeing Nevada's first ever early presidential caucus. She ran for Congress again in 2008, but lost.

== Biography ==
=== Early life and education ===
Derby is a fourth generation Nevadan. Her great-grandfather, Thomas Derby II, acquired land along the now I-80 corridor through Lovelock, the current home to both the Derby Airport and the Derby Dam. Her grandfather, Charles Derby, worked as a mining engineer in the Virginia City mines, and her father attended Fourth Ward School in Virginia City, later moving to Lovelock to develop the Flying Flapjack Ranch, where Derby spent the first years of her life.

Derby attended the University of California, Berkeley and then the University of California, San Francisco, where she obtained a bachelor's degree. After residing in the Bay Area, teaching, and traveling, she took a job with a company in Saudi Arabia in 1966 and lived there for three years. Upon returning to the United States, she earned a second bachelor's degree in anthropology from the University of Nevada, Las Vegas, followed by a master's degree and a Ph.D. in cultural anthropology with a specialization in Middle Eastern cultures from the University of California, Davis.

=== Personal life ===
Derby is married to veterinarian Steven Talbot. They have one daughter, Tobyn Derby-Talbot and one son, Ryan Derby-Talbot. Derby has lived in a Gardnerville, Nevada home for more than twenty years.

== 2006 Congressional Campaign ==
Derby ran against Nevada Secretary of State Dean Heller, who won the Republican nomination in August and the general election in November.

Derby was always fighting an uphill battle in her campaign to win a historically Republican district. Although she did win the Democratic primary by default (no Democrat challenged her in the primary election), many claimed she had no chance of winning. When polls showed the race was tied, President George W. Bush came to Nevada twice to campaign for Heller.

Derby had numerous supporters early on. In December 2005, CNN political analyst Paul Begala, who helped engineer Bill Clinton's 1992 win, said he was encouraged by U.S. Rep. Rahm Emanuel, chairman of the Democratic Congressional Campaign Committee to "stump" for Derby. In July the Las Vegas Sun reported Derby raised $269,000, ending with nearly $514,000 on hand for her campaign.

On September 20, 2006, the Las Vegas Sun reported, "Heller was 8 points ahead of Democrat Jill Derby of Gardnerville. In a Reno Gazette-Journal-KRNV News 4 poll taken soon later with a 4 percent margin of error, 18 percent of the potential voters were undecided."

The race was close, but Heller managed to maintain a 5 percent lead winning 50% of the vote compared to Derby's 45%. Derby carried Washoe County, home to Reno and by far the largest county in the district. However, Heller ran up enough of a margin in the rest of the district to win.

In response to her defeat Derby said "I got into this race to take Congress back, to restore the checks and balances that have been absent in our government, and get our country back on track to a brighter future. All that got accomplished in this election. We lost our battle but we won the war."

== Democratic Chairwoman ==
On March 31, 2007, Nevada Democrats elected Derby as the state chairwoman of the Democratic Party. She took over for Tom Collins who chose not to run for reelection. Derby led the party during Nevada's historic early presidential caucus on Jan. 19, 2008, which resulted in a statewide shift of voter registration leading to a Democratic majority in Nevada for the first time in decades. She stepped down on February 19, 2008, to run for Congress. She was succeeded by First Vice Chair Sam Lieberman.

== 2008 Congressional Campaign ==
On February 20, 2008, Derby announced a second run for Nevada's 2nd congressional district against her previous opponent, freshman congressman Dean Heller.

== See also ==
- 2006 United States House of Representatives elections in Nevada
- 2008 United States House of Representatives elections in Nevada
