= Dean Heller =

American politician (born 1960)

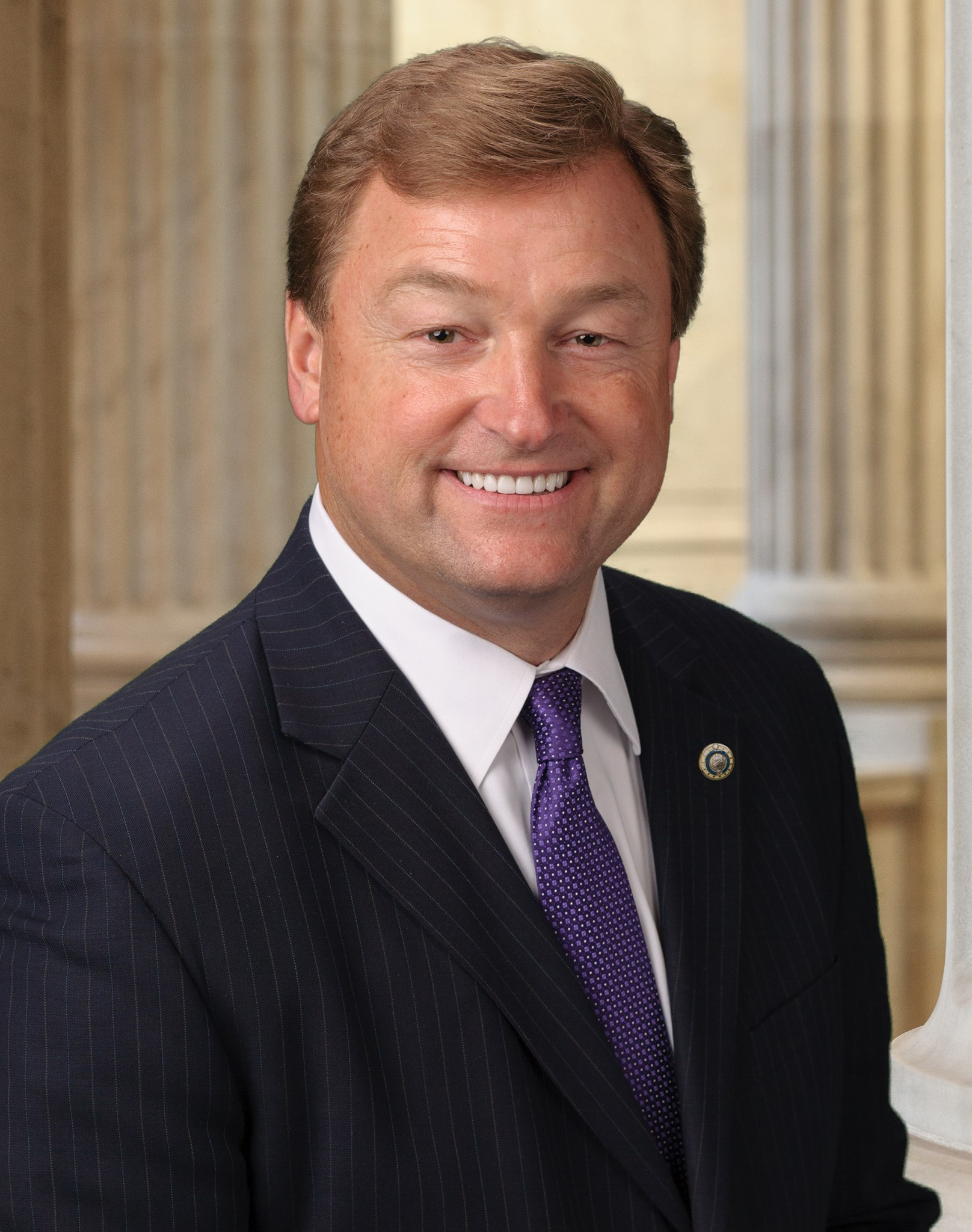
- Official portrait, 2015

United States Senator from Nevada
- In office May 9, 2011 – January 3, 2019
- Preceded by: John Ensign
- Succeeded by: Jacky Rosen

Member of the U.S. House of Representatives from Nevada's 2nd district
- In office January 3, 2007 – May 9, 2011
- Preceded by: Jim Gibbons
- Succeeded by: Mark Amodei

15th Secretary of State of Nevada
- In office January 3, 1995 – January 3, 2007
- Governor: Bob Miller; Kenny Guinn; Jim Gibbons
- Preceded by: Cheryl Lau
- Succeeded by: Ross Miller

Member of the Nevada Assembly from the 40th district
- In office November 7, 1990 – November 9, 1994
- Preceded by: Ernie Adler
- Succeeded by: Thomas Fettic

Personal details
- Born: Dean Arthur Heller; May 10, 1960 (age 66) Castro Valley, California, U.S.
- Party: Republican
- Spouse: Lynne Brombach
- Children: 4
- Education: University of Southern California (BBA)
- Heller's voice Heller requesting support to repeal the ACA's "cadillac tax" on the Senate floor. Recorded December 9, 2015

Dean Arthur Heller (born May 10, 1960) is an American businessman and politician who served as a United States senator representing Nevada from 2011 to 2019. A member of the Republican Party, he served as the 15th secretary of state of Nevada from 1995 to 2007 and U.S. representative for Nevada's 2nd congressional district from 2007 to 2011. He was appointed to the U.S. Senate by Governor Brian Sandoval and elected to a full term in the 2012 election. Heller was defeated in the 2018 election, losing to Democrat Jacky Rosen, and was an unsuccessful candidate for governor of Nevada in 2022. As of 2026, he is the last Republican to have won a U.S. Senate race in Nevada.

== Early life and education ==
Heller was born in Castro Valley, California, to Janet (née MacNelly) and Charles Alfred "Jack" Heller, a mechanic and stock car driver. He moved to Carson City, Nevada with his family when he was nine months old. He has five siblings.

He graduated from Carson High School in 1978, and was accepted into the University of Southern California, where he earned his BBA, specializing in finance and securities analysis, from the USC Marshall School of Business in 1985. At USC, Heller joined the Sigma Nu social fraternity and the Trojan Knights.

== Early career ==
=== Nevada Assembly ===
Heller served two terms in the Nevada Assembly from 1990 to 1994. He represented Carson City, the capital of Nevada. During his time in the Nevada Assembly, Heller worked as a senior commercial banking consultant for Bank of America (1990–1995).

=== Nevada secretary of state ===
Heller was elected secretary of state of Nevada in 1994 and reelected in 1998 and 2002, serving from 1995 to 2007, when he was elected to the United States House of Representatives. As Secretary of State, Heller made Nevada the first state in the nation to implement an auditable paper trail to electronic voting machines.

== U.S. House of Representatives ==
=== Elections ===
==== 2006 ====
Heller decided to run for the U.S. House of Representatives in 2005 in Nevada's 2nd congressional district, after ten-year incumbent Republican Jim Gibbons decided to run for Governor of Nevada. On August 15, 2006, he won the Republican primary with 36% of the vote. He narrowly defeated State Assemblywoman Sharron Angle by 421 votes. Angle received 35% of the vote and former state Assemblywoman Dawn Gibbons (wife of the incumbent) received 25% of the vote.

In the general election, Heller defeated Democratic nominee and University of Nevada Regent Jill Derby, by a 49% to 46% margin. Derby carried Washoe County, home to Reno and the largest county in the district. However, Heller ran up enough of a margin in the rest of the district to win. He was likely helped by Gibbons' presence atop the ticket; Gibbons carried his former district in a landslide in his successful run for governor. It was only the third close race in the district since its creation in 1983.

==== 2008 ====
Heller won the Republican primary again, this time defeating James W. Smack 86% to 14%. In a rematch, Heller defeated Derby in the general election, 52% to 41%. This time he won every county in the district except Clark County.

==== 2010 ====
In 2009, Heller was rumored to be a candidate to challenge embattled incumbent Republican Governor Jim Gibbons or Democratic United States Senator Harry Reid in 2010. He declined to run for Nevada Governor or U.S. Senator and instead chose to run for reelection.

He was challenged in the Republican primary again. He defeated Patrick J. Colletti 84%–16%. He won reelection to a third term, defeating Nancy Price 63%–36%.

=== Tenure ===
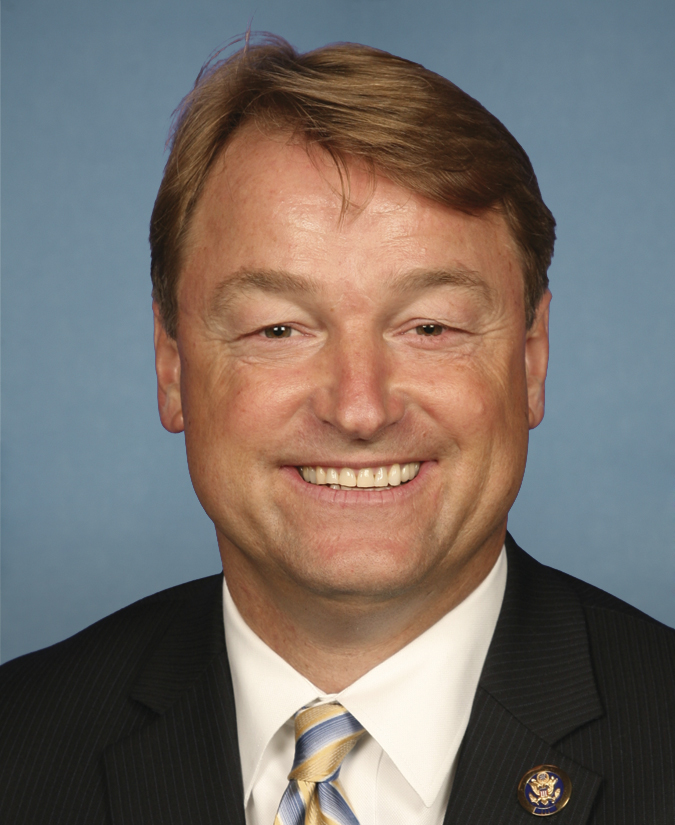
Heller during the 112th Congress

During his tenure, Heller was Vice Chairman of the Congressional Western Caucus, playing a leading role in advocating for issues that impact western U.S. states. He opposed the Troubled Asset Relief Program (TARP).

=== Committee assignments ===
- Committee on Ways and Means
  - Subcommittee on Income Security and Family Support
  - Subcommittee on Select Revenue Measures

== U.S. Senate ==
=== Elections ===
==== 2012 ====
In March 2011, after U.S. Senator John Ensign announced his resignation, Heller declared that he would run for the United States Senate in 2012 to succeed him. Nevada Governor Brian Sandoval then appointed Heller to the U.S. Senate to fill the vacancy created by Ensign's resignation. Heller took office on May 9, 2011.

In his bid for a full Senate term, Heller faced Nevada's 1st congressional district U.S. Representative Shelley Berkley in November 2012. Heller defeated Berkley, 45.9% to 44.7%.

==== 2018 ====
In August 2017, Las Vegas businessman Danny Tarkanian, a strong supporter of President Donald Trump, announced that he would mount a primary challenge to Heller. Tarkanian stated that "we are never going to make America great again unless we have Senators in office that fully support President Trump and his America-First agenda" and explained that he wanted to "repeal Obamacare and end illegal immigration."

In September 2017, NBC News reported that Heller was "widely considered the most endangered Senator up for reelection in next year's midterm cycle." He was described as facing "substantial opposition from both conservatives within his own party and a general electorate trending Democratic" and as having "a difficult relationship with President Donald Trump." At a fundraiser, Nevada Republicans were supportive of Trump but critical of Heller.

On February 1, 2018, President Trump told Republican National Committee members that he would travel to Nevada to campaign for Heller in a competitive Republican primary. In March 2018, Trump persuaded Tarkanian to drop his challenge to Heller. Tarkanian said that he would instead run for the United States House of Representatives in Nevada's 3rd congressional district with Trump's full support and the incumbent Democrat Jacky Rosen retiring to challenge Heller.

In the November 2018 general election, Heller was defeated by Democratic challenger Jacky Rosen. Rosen received 50% of the vote to Heller's 45%, with a variety of third party candidates receiving 5% of the total vote. While Heller carried 15 of Nevada's 17 county-level jurisdictions, Rosen carried the two largest, Clark (home to Las Vegas) and Washoe (home to Reno). Ultimately, Heller could not overcome a 92,000-vote deficit in Clark County.

=== Tenure ===
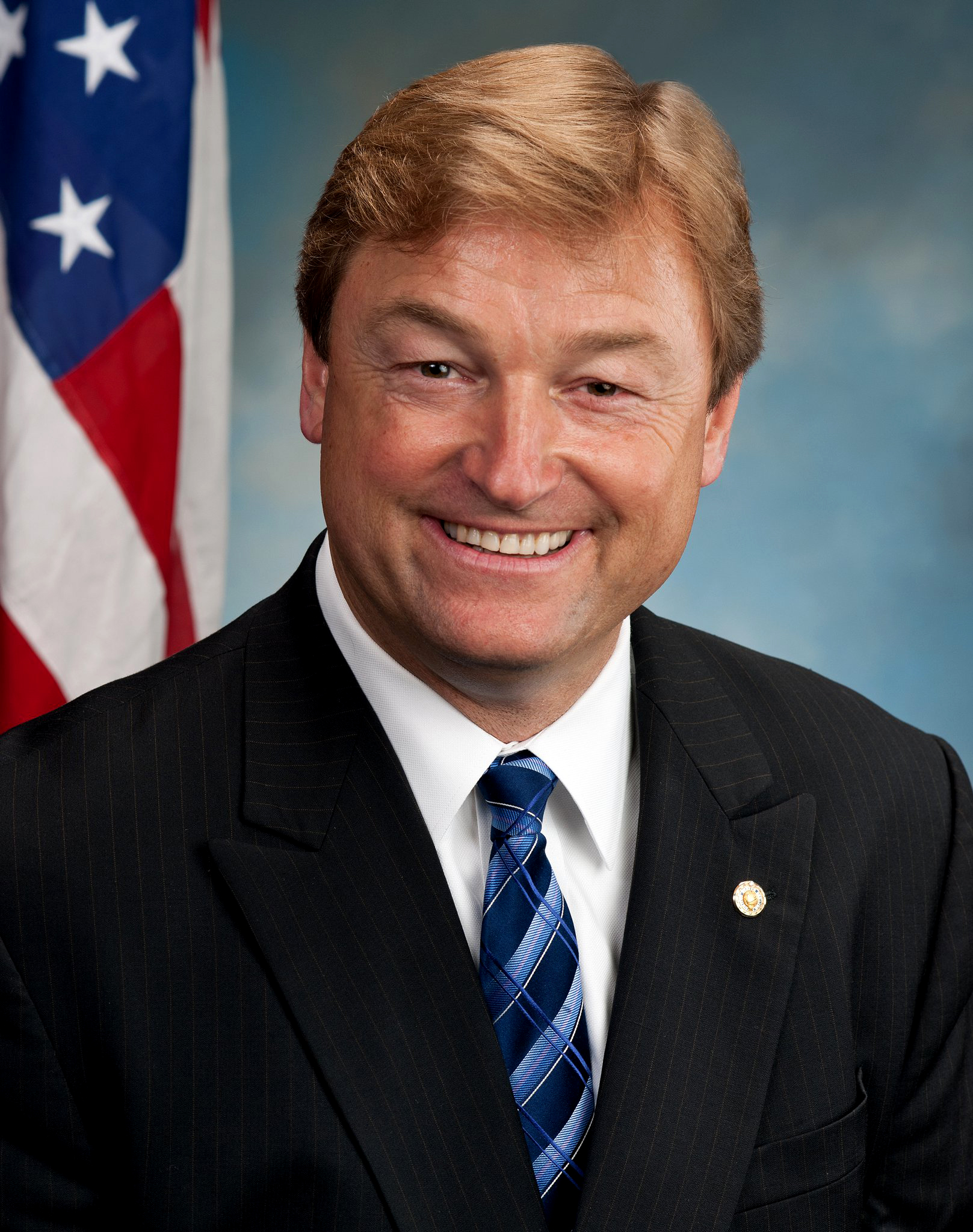
Official portrait of Senator Dean Heller, 113th United States Congress

On May 23, 2013, Heller introduced S. 1049 into the U.S. Senate. The bill is an official companion measure to the Good Samaritan Search and Recovery Act of 2013 (H.R. 2166; 113th Congress), introduced in the House by Nevada Representative Joe Heck. The bills would require the federal government to issue permits within 48 hours to volunteer search and rescue groups that would allow them to search federal lands. Heller argued that "the last thing families who have lost loved ones need is the federal government to stand in the way of recovering their remains."

In 2013, Heller was one of 18 Senators who voted against the bill to reopen the government during the United States government shutdown of 2013. Regarding the vote, Heller said: "I wanted to be able to support a deal, but this proposal makes no underlying structural changes that will prevent this exact same crisis from happening again in the very near future. Considering this legislation does nothing to place our nation on sound fiscal footing or cultivate a growth economy that will produce jobs in the long term, I cannot support it."

Heller campaigned to be elected Chairman of the National Republican Senatorial Committee for the 114th U.S. Congress, but was defeated by Mississippi Senator Roger Wicker on November 13, 2014.

=== Committee assignments ===
Heller was a member of the following committees:

- Committee on Banking, Housing, and Urban Affairs
  - Subcommittee on Economic Policy (Chair)
  - Subcommittee on Housing, Transportation, and Community Development
  - Subcommittee on Financial Institutions and Consumer Protection
- Committee on Commerce, Science, and Transportation
  - Subcommittee on Aviation Operations, Safety, and Security
  - Subcommittee on Communications, Technology, Innovation, and the Internet
  - Subcommittee on Consumer Protection, Product Safety, Insurance and Data Security
  - Subcommittee on Surface Transportation and Merchant Marine Infrastructure, Safety, and Security
- Committee on Finance
  - Subcommittee on Taxation and IRS Oversight
  - Subcommittee on Health Care
  - Subcommittee on Social Security, Pensions, and Family Policy (Chair)
- Committee on Veterans' Affairs

== Political positions ==
A Republican, Heller was ranked as the 5th most bipartisan member of the U.S. Senate during the first session of the 115th United States Congress by the Bipartisan Index, a metric created by The Lugar Center and Georgetown's McCourt School of Public Policy to better gauge congressional bipartisanship.

During the Obama administration, there was a degree of friction between Heller and President Obama. In 2010, Heller criticized President Obama for using Las Vegas as a synonym for wasting money. Heller said, “Nevada has one of the most distressed economies in the country, and the President has done little to focus on job creation over the past year.” Heller's relationship with President Trump has undergone considerable evolution. During the 2016 campaign, Heller said Trump "denigrates human beings" and suggested that he wouldn't vote for him, although he later said that he did. In February 2018, the AP noted that Heller, who “had been publicly chided by President Donald Trump months earlier” was now “working closely with the White House.” A “steady rapprochement” had taken place “between the swing-state senator and loyalty-loving president,” stated the AP.

=== Abortion ===
Heller voted against federal funding for abortion. In 2017, he supported abortion access in cases of rape, incest, or life-endangering harm to the mother.

Heller came under right-wing criticism in spring 2017, after he told a Reno audience that he had “no problem” funding Planned Parenthood.

In 2021, in launching his campaign for Governor, he shifted to much stronger opposition to abortion, saying, "As governor, I'll get the most conservative abortion laws that we can have in this state, regardless with who's controlling the Legislature at the time." He also said, "I like what Texas did," referring to the Texas Heartbeat Act, which prohibited abortion after about the sixth week of gestation. The law contains an exception for abortions carried out to save the mother's life. Although the law prohibits perpetrators of rape or incest from enforcing the law concerning fetuses they have conceived, it does not contain a carve-out allowing all abortions of fetuses conceived by rape or incest.

=== Cuba ===
Heller supported the initiative by President Barack Obama to normalize relations with Cuba, and was part of a bipartisan delegation to Havana.

=== Economy ===
Heller opposed the Emergency Economic Stabilization Act of 2008 that created the Troubled Asset Relief Program, characterizing the bill as "a massive bailout of Wall Street". He also opposed the Auto Industry Financing and Restructuring Act of 2008.

=== Energy and environment ===
Heller has voted in support of the development of domestic oil, gas, and coal. He has also supported tax incentives for renewable energy.

Heller has confronted the former Trump administration "over its plans to reopen" the Yucca Mountain facility, a large nuclear waste repository near Las Vegas, Nevada. Specifically, Heller is against Trump seeking $47.7 billion in his administration's budget request for fiscal year 2019 "to restart the licensing process for Yucca Mountain". In a letter to the Senate's Energy and Water panel, he called the idea a "breach of state sovereignty", citing "health and safety risks and potentially catastrophic financial risks" involved with the project's approval.

=== Gun policy ===
The NRA Political Victory Fund endorsed Heller during his 2012 U.S. Senate run. From 1998 through 2016, the NRA donated $122,802 to Heller's political campaigns.

Heller voted in 2011 to allow veterans to register guns bought overseas in the U.S. During his 2012 campaign, he hosted a campaign rally at a gun store in Las Vegas.

In 2013, Heller voted against legislation to limit gun magazine capacity, ban assault weapons and to expand background checks on gun sales at gun shows and made on the internet. In the past he has supported more restrictive background checks but voted against them due to fear that a national gun registry could be created.

=== Relationship with President Donald Trump ===
During the 2016 presidential election campaign, Heller said that he was "vehemently opposed" to Donald Trump. By May 2018, The New York Times wrote that Heller had come to recently embrace Trump. CNN noted that Heller had "aligned himself closely" with Trump after the President in 2017 threatened to support a primary challenge against him. Following the threat, Heller flip-flopped on health care (ultimately supporting a conservative bill to repeal the Affordable Care Act), supported Trump's immigration reform proposal, and avoided direct criticism of Trump for several months. In March 2018, Trump endorsed Heller in his Senate bid, convincing primary challenger Danny Tarkanian to drop out of the race.

In 2018, Heller repeatedly confronted the Trump administration over its plans to reopen the Yucca Mountain nuclear waste repository.

In April 2018, Heller said that he did not support legislation to protect Special Counsel Robert Mueller from being fired by Trump, saying "I don't think that's going to happen so I don't think there's a need for legislation." Heller said that he did not want the President to fire Mueller but that Mueller should quickly wrap up the investigation into Russian interference in the 2016 United States elections.

Since Joe Biden defeated Donald Trump in the 2020 presidential election, Heller has repeatedly refused to acknowledge Biden winning the presidency.

=== Health care ===
Heller voted against the Affordable Care Act (also known as Obamacare).

During the debate prior to the federal healthcare law's passage, Heller said that members of Congress should be forced to join any government-run healthcare plan proposed in early versions of the healthcare law.

Heller questioned the constitutionality of the law following its passage, and called on Nevada Attorney General Catherine Cortez Masto to join a multi-state lawsuit challenging it.

On January 19, 2011, Heller voted to repeal the Affordable Care Act (Obamacare).

In May 2013, Heller introduced a bill to suspend $440 million in IRS funding to enforce Obamacare.

In June 2013, Heller called Obamacare a “colossal monstrosity,” but in April 2014, The Hill named him as one of several “anxious Senate Republicans” who were worried that Republican leaders were “focusing too much this election year on Obamacare.”

In June 2017, Heller held a joint press conference with Nevada Governor Brian Sandoval, where Heller fervently opposed the American Health Care Act, the Republican Party's repeal and replacement bill for the Affordable Care Act (ACA). Heller said that he could not support a bill "that takes away insurance from tens of millions of Americans and hundreds of thousands of Nevadans."

At a Republican Senate meeting held at the White House July 19, 2017, President Trump said "Look, he wants to remain a senator, doesn't he? And I think the people of your state, which I know very well, I think they're gonna appreciate what you hopefully will do." to Heller and the media. A few days later, Heller voted yes to allow debate on legislation to repeal and replace the ACA. Heller was one of seven Republicans who voted 'no' to repealing the ACA without a replacement. Two days later, he voted in favor of "skinny" repeal of the Affordable Care Act. The July 2017 attempt to repeal failed when Republican Senators John McCain, Susan Collins, and Lisa Murkowski voted against the "skinny" repeal proposal. In August 2017, when asked about the Senate's health care votes, Heller said that he was "real pleased at the way this thing turned out".

In September 2017, Senators Graham, Cassidy, Heller, Johnson and Santorum proposed another health care reform bill, commonly referred to as "Graham-Cassidy" or "Graham-Cassidy-Heller-Johnson". This bill did not come up for a vote in the Senate, after three Republican Senators said they would not vote for it, making it mathematically impossible to pass.

In December 2017, at least 10 protestors were removed from a LIBRE Initiative public event with Senator Heller. Cancer patient and health care activist Laura Packard was escorted out after questioning him about his health care votes.

During his 2018 re-election campaign, Heller said that he had authored a bill that would have kept in place protections for preexisting conditions; according to CNN, this was false: the Graham-Cassidy bill would have "actually weakened Obamacare's protections for those with pre-existing conditions. Had that legislation become law, states could have opted to once again allow carriers to base premiums on a person's medical history and to sell skimpier policies that don't cover Obamacare's 10 essential health benefits. Those with pre-existing conditions could have found themselves unable to afford insurance or able to only buy bare bones policies that wouldn't have covered all the treatments they need."

=== Immigration and refugees ===
In 2010, Heller voted against the DREAM Act, which would have provided a path to citizenship for unauthorized immigrant minors provided that they join the military or go to university. He voted for the comprehensive immigration reform bill created by the "Gang of Eight" in 2013. By February 2018, Heller had moved further to the right on immigration. Heller suggested that he was supportive of Trump's proposed immigration reforms, saying "I have a tendency to support what the president’s trying to do, and that’s probably the position that’s closest to where I am." Trump's proposed immigration reforms would cut legal immigration, increase border security spending, and offer a pathway to citizenship for 1.8 million undocumented immigrants (a far lower number than in the Gang of Eight bill). Politico wrote that Heller has "often projected a moderate stance on immigration" but that supporting President Trump's immigration policies could be "useful heading into a primary challenge" from Danny Tarkanian.

Heller opposed Trump's 2017 executive order to impose a temporary ban on entry to the U.S. to citizens of seven Muslim-majority countries, saying: "I agree that better vetting and border protection measures are necessary to our current immigration system. That's why I support the thorough vetting of individuals entering our country. However, I am deeply troubled by the appearance of a religious ban. The use of an overly broad executive order is not the way to strengthen national security. I encourage the Administration to partner with Congress to find a solution."

In a February 2018 interview, Heller said he was optimistic that the two parties would eventually agree on a solution to the DACA issue. In April 2018, Heller said he wanted Congress to find "relief for DACA recipients."

=== Human trafficking ===
In 2015, Heller authored an amendment which provided training for airport security and border patrol personnel to identify victims of human trafficking. The amendment was successfully added to a bill to combat human trafficking.

=== Israel ===
Part of Heller's 2012 campaign platform revolved around his stance on Israel and the nation's relationship with the United States. Heller advocates for American assistance to Israel so that the country will have the ability to defend itself and supports punishments for Iran's pursuit of weapons of mass destruction.

In 2011 Heller introduced the Jerusalem Embassy and Recognition Act of 2011, legislation that reaffirms the United States' commitment to Israel to relocate the U.S. embassy from Tel Aviv to Jerusalem.

On January 3, 2017, he joined fellow GOP U.S. Senators Ted Cruz (R-TX) and Marco Rubio (R-FL) in introducing a new Jerusalem Embassy and Recognition Act shortly after being sworn into the new 115th Congress. The legislation was intended to eliminate a waiver loophole in the 1995 law to move the Embassy to Jerusalem, and recognize Jerusalem as Israel's official capital.

=== Labor unions ===
Heller opposes the Employee Free Choice Act, proposed legislation that would effectively eliminate secret ballots in union organizing elections and subject employers and employees to mandatory arbitration when negotiating union contracts.

=== LGBT rights ===
Heller voted against the Don't Ask, Don't Tell Repeal Act of 2010 in the House of Representatives. In 2013, Heller announced that he supported the Employment Non-Discrimination Act (ENDA), which would prohibit employment discrimination on the basis of sexual orientation. He opposes same-sex marriage. In 2015, Heller voted to endorse Social Security and veterans benefits for married gay couples.

=== Minimum wage ===
Heller voted against the Fair Minimum Wage Act of 2007. In April 2014, the United States Senate debated the Minimum Wage Fairness Act (S. 1737; 113th Congress). The bill would amend the Fair Labor Standards Act of 1938 (FLSA) to increase the federal minimum wage for employees to $10.10 per hour over the course of a two-year period. The bill was strongly supported by President Barack Obama and many of the Democratic Senators, but strongly opposed by Republicans in the Senate and House. Heller opposed the bill, arguing that Nevada already had a minimum wage higher than the federally mandated level and that he thought the minimum wage should be left up to the states. Heller said "I think there is a difference between North and South, East and West on what those minimum wages ought to be."

=== Unemployment insurance ===
In April 2014, Heller led a successful effort to pass legislation in the Senate extending emergency unemployment benefits to 2 million Americans.

=== Violence Against Women Act ===
Heller voted for reauthorization of the Violence Against Women Act in 2012.

=== School safety ===
In March 2018, Heller and 20 other senators introduced the Students, Teachers, and Officers Preventing (STOP) School Violence Act of 2018, which would allocate funding with the goal of improving school security.

=== Supreme Court ===
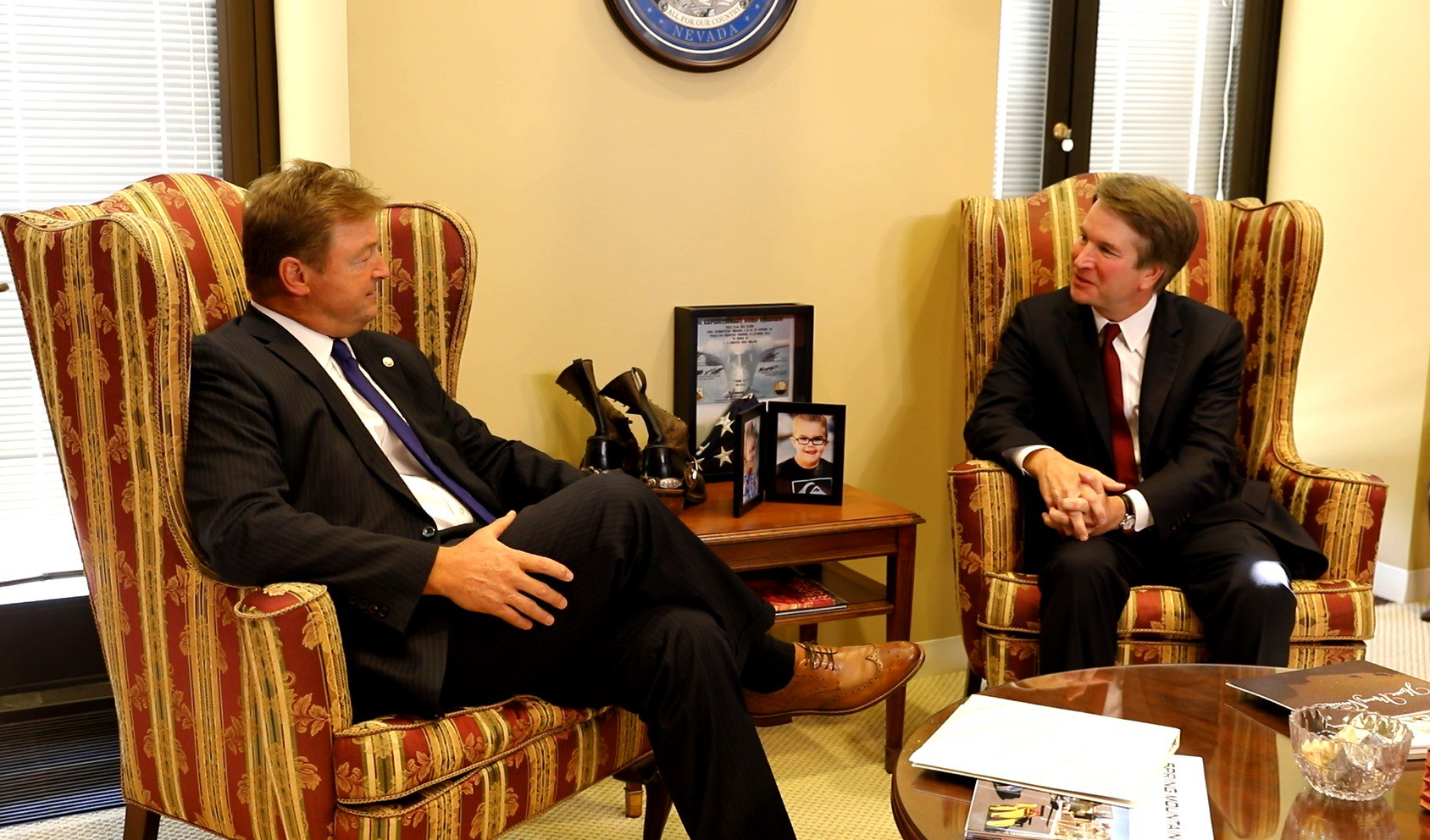
Heller meeting with Brett Kavanaugh, July 2018

After the death of Justice Antonin Scalia, Heller was the first Republican senator to break with party leader Mitch McConnell and say that President Barack Obama should nominate a replacement. He said Nevadans “should have a voice” in replacing Scalia.

In April 2017, he voted to invoke cloture (end debate) on the nomination of Supreme Court nominee Neil Gorsuch, putting an end to the Democratic filibuster. Heller also voted for the "nuclear option", ending the three-fifths (60-vote threshold) for Supreme Court nominees.

In October 2018, Heller voted in favor of Brett Kavanaugh's successful nomination to the U.S. Supreme Court. Kavanaugh had been accused by several women of sexual assault; Heller referred to these allegations as a "hiccup", and later clarified that sexual assault allegations should not be considered to be a hiccup.

== 2022 gubernatorial campaign ==
Speculation on a potential Heller bid for Governor of Nevada started circulating around mid-2021. They were confirmed on September 22, 2021, when Heller announced his candidacy for governor on the Republican ticket in the 2022 primary race, hoping to challenge and defeat incumbent Democratic Governor Steve Sisolak. He was initially considered the favorite for the nomination. However, his refusal to acknowledge Joe Biden as the winner in the 2020 United States presidential election, citing him as an "illegitimate president", damaged his credibility and Clark County Sheriff Joe Lombardo surged in the polls. Amid his failing campaign, Heller made various attacks on Lombardo, including attacking Lombardo's decision to endorse Sisolak in the 2018 election instead of the Republican nominee Adam Laxalt, but Lombardo had a major fundraising advantage over Heller. In June, Lombardo won the nomination, defeating Heller and 10 other candidates. Afterwards, Heller reversed his previous comments and endorsed Lombardo for governor. In the general election on November 8, Lombardo defeated Steve Sisolak for a narrow victory.

== Personal life ==
A member of the Church of Jesus Christ of Latter-day Saints, he and his wife Lynne have four children and two grandchildren. His son-in-law, Ed Ableser, served for nearly ten years as a Democratic member of the Arizona Legislature.

Heller was a founding board member of the Boys and Girls Club of Western Nevada and the Western Nevada Community College Foundation. He is an advisory board member for Nevada's Foster Grandparent program.

Heller's wife Lynne competed on the original Family Feud game show in 1985 under the Brombach family name along with her father, sister and two other relatives. They had a winning streak that lasted through several episodes before losing to the Peterson family. The Brombachs finished with cash winnings totaling $18,344.

Dean Heller, is also the father of Harris Heller, the YouTuber from Senpai Gaming

== Electoral history ==
2006 election
Party	Candidate	Votes	%
Republican	Dean Heller	117,168	50.35
Democratic	Jill Derby	104,593	44.94
Independent	Daniel Rosen	5,524	2.37
Independent American	James C. Kroshus	5,439	2.34
Total votes		232,724	100.0
Republican hold			

Nevada's 2nd congressional district election, 2008
Party	Candidate	Votes	%
Republican	Dean Heller (incumbent)	170,771	51.82
Democratic	Jill Derby	136,548	41.44
Independent American	John Everhart	11,179	3.39
Libertarian	Sean Patrick Morse	5,740	1.74
Green	Craig Bergland	5,282	1.60
Total votes		329,520	100.00
Republican hold			

Nevada's 2nd congressional district election, 2010
Party	Candidate	Votes	%
Republican	Dean Heller (Incumbent)	169,458	63.30
Democratic	Nancy Price	87,421	32.66
Independent American	Russell Best	10,829	4.05
Total votes		267,708	100.00
Republican hold			

Republican primary results
Party	Candidate	Votes	%
Republican	Dean Heller (incumbent)	88,958	86.3
Republican	Sherry Brooks	5,356	5.2
	None of These Candidates	3,358	3.3
Republican	Eddie "In Liberty" Hamilton	2,628	2.6
Republican	Richard Charles	2,295	2.2
Republican	Carlo "Nakusa" Poliak	512	0.5
Total votes		103,107	100

United States Senate election in Nevada, 2012
Party	Candidate	Votes	%	±%
Republican	Dean Heller (incumbent)	457,656	45.87%	−9.49%
Democratic	Shelley Berkley	446,080	44.71%	+3.72%
Independent American	David Lory VanDerBeek	48,792	4.89%	+3.56%
n/a	None of These Candidates	45,277	4.54%	+3.13%
Total votes		997,805	100.0%	N/A
Republican hold				

Republican primary results, Nevada 2018
Party	Candidate	Votes	%
Republican	Dean Heller (incumbent)	99,509	69.97%
Republican	Tom Heck	26,296	18.49%
Republican	None of These Candidates	5,978	4.20%
Republican	Sherry Brooks	5,145	3.62%
Republican	Sarah Gazala	4,011	2.82%
Republican	Vic Harrell	1,282	0.90%
Total votes		142,221	100%

United States Senate election in Nevada, 2018
Party	Candidate	Votes	%	±%
Democratic	Jacky Rosen	490,071	50.41%	+5.70%
Republican	Dean Heller (incumbent)	441,202	45.38%	−0.49%
n/a	None of These Candidates	15,303	1.57%	−2.97%
Independent	Barry Michaels	9,269	0.95%	N/A
Libertarian	Tim Hagan	9,196	0.95%	N/A
Independent American	Kamau Bakari	7,091	0.73%	−4.16%
Total votes		972,132	100%	N/A
Democratic gain from Republican				

Nevada gubernatorial Republican primary, 2022
Party	Candidate	Votes	%
Republican	Joe Lombardo	77,319	38.3%
Republican	Joey Gilbert	54,676	27.1%
Republican	Dean Heller	28,510	14.1%
Republican	John Jay Lee	16,160	8.0%
Republican	Guy Nohra	7,364	3.6%
Republican	Fred J. Simon	5,825	2.9%
Republican	Thomas Heck	3,845	1.9%
None of These Candidates		3,635	1.8%
Republican	Eddie Hamilton	1,160	0.6%
Republican	Amber Whitley	1,106	0.5%
Republican	William Walls	653	0.3%
Republican	Gary Evertsen	497	0.3%
Republican	Seven Achilles Evans	424	0.2%
Republican	Edward O'Brien	397	0.2%
Republican	Barak Zilberberg	308	0.1%
Republican	Stanleigh Lusak	208	0.1%
Total votes		202,087	100%

Political offices
Preceded by Cheryl Lau	Secretary of State of Nevada; 1995–2007	Succeeded by Ross Miller
U.S. House of Representatives
Preceded by Jim Gibbons	Member of the U.S. House of Representatives from Nevada's 2nd congressional district 2007–2011	Succeeded by Mark Amodei
Party political offices
Preceded by John Ensign	Republican nominee for U.S. Senator from Nevada (Class 1); 2012, 2018	Succeeded by Sam Brown
U.S. Senate
Preceded by John Ensign	United States Senator (Class 1) from Nevada; 2011–2019; Served alongside: Harry Reid, Catherine Cortez Masto	Succeeded by Jacky Rosen
U.S. order of precedence (ceremonial)
Preceded by John Ensign as former U.S. Senator	Order of precedence of the United States as former U.S. Senator	Succeeded by Ben Sasse as former U.S. Senator
