= 2018 New York Attorney General election =

- November 6, 2018
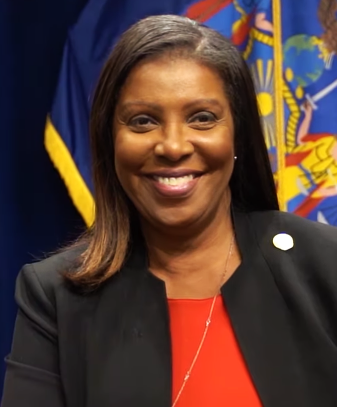

Nominee	Letitia James	Keith Wofford
Party	Democratic	Republican
Alliance	Parties: Working Families; Independence	Parties: Conservative
Popular vote	3,739,239	2,108,600
Percentage	62.39%	35.18%
- James: 30–40% 40–50% 50–60% 60–70% 70–80% 80–90% >90% Wofford: 40–50% 50–60% 60–70% 70–80% 80–90% >90% Tie: 40–50% 50% No votes
Attorney General before election
Barbara Underwood
Democratic
Elected Attorney General
Letitia James
Democratic

The 2018 New York Attorney General election took place on November 6, 2018. New York City Public Advocate Letitia James, a Democrat, was elected. James is the first woman and the first African-American to be elected New York Attorney General.

Former attorney general Eric Schneiderman resigned on May 8, 2018, after allegations of domestic abuse and withdrew from his then-ongoing reelection campaign. Incumbent solicitor general Barbara Underwood was chosen by the legislature to complete the unexpired term, but opted not to seek election to a full term.

On September 13, 2018, James won the Democratic nomination for attorney general, defeating Leecia Eve, former senior policy advisor to U.S. Senator Hillary Clinton; Sean Patrick Maloney, U.S. Representative for New York's 18th congressional district; and Zephyr Teachout, professor at Fordham University School of Law. In the general election, James defeated Republican Party candidate Keith Wofford with over 60% of the vote.

In the general election, James carried every county won by Andrew Cuomo in the concurrent gubernatorial election as well as Franklin, Clinton, Essex, Orange, Duchess, Columbia, Broome, Cortland and Schenectady counties.

== Background ==
Attorney General Eric Schneiderman, a Democrat, was first elected to the office of Attorney General in 2010, winning reelection in 2014. He was in the midst of campaigning for a third term in office when, on May 7, 2018, The New Yorker revealed allegations that he had physically abused several women he had dated during his tenure in office. Schneiderman resigned hours after the story was released, with the resignation taking effect at the end of the business day May 8; he did not seek re-election.

Barbara Underwood, the solicitor general, took on the duties of Attorney General upon Schneiderman's resignation. A joint session of the New York State Legislature formally appointed Underwood to fill the rest of Schneiderman's term on May 22, after interviewing several potential candidates; of the 209 members in the State Legislature, 190 votes were cast in favor, with one (Charles Barron) voting against her in protest of the process, and 18 abstaining. Underwood confirmed that she would not run for the office in the 2018 elections, and returned to her previous position as solicitor general following the election.

== Democratic primary ==
=== Candidates ===
==== Filed ====
The following candidates were certified by the State Board of Elections as having filed for the primary ballot (James by state convention nomination and the others by submitting sufficient signatures):

- Leecia Eve, former senior policy advisor to U.S. Senator Hillary Clinton, candidate for Lieutenant Governor of New York in 2006
- Letitia James, New York City Public Advocate (nominee of the state party convention)
- Sean Patrick Maloney, U.S. Representative for New York's 18th congressional district
- Zephyr Teachout, Fordham Law Associate Professor, nominee for the U.S. House of Representatives in New York's 19th congressional district in 2016, candidate for Governor of New York in 2014

==== Withdrew ====
- Eric Schneiderman, former attorney general

==== Declined ====
- Daniel Garodnick, former member of the New York City Council
- Michael Gianaris, New York State Senator
- Charles D. Lavine, Member of the New York State Assembly
- Kathleen Rice, U.S. Representative from New York's 4th congressional district
- Barbara Underwood, interim Attorney General
- Tim Wu, special enforcement counsel to the attorney general and 2014 lieutenant governor primary candidate

=== Endorsements ===
Letitia James

Organizations

- 1199SEIU United Healthcare Workers East
- Barack Obama Democratic Club of Upper Manhattan
- Communications Workers of America District 1
- Communications Workers of America Local 1180
- District Council 37
- EMILY's List
- Gay and Lesbian Independent Democrats
- International Association of Bridge, Structural, Ornamental and Reinforcing Iron Workers
- Jim Owles Liberal Democratic Club
- Laborers' International Union of North America
- Lambda Independent Democrats of Brooklyn
- Retail, Wholesale and Department Store Union
- SEIU 32BJ
- Transport Workers Union of America Local 100

Local and state politicians

- Alicka Ampry-Samuel, Member of New York City Council
- Justin Brannan, Member of New York City Council
- Byron Brown, Mayor of Buffalo
- Robert Cornegy, Member of New York City Council
- Marcos Crespo, Member of the New York State Assembly
- Laurie Cumbo, Majority Leader of New York City Council
- Andrew Cuomo, 56th Governor of New York
- Chaim Deutsch, Member of New York City Council
- Rubén Díaz Jr., Borough President of the Bronx
- Michael Gianaris, Member of the New York Senate
- Carl Heastie, Speaker of the New York State Assembly
- Earlene Hill Hooper, Deputy Speaker of the New York State Assembly
- Corey Johnson, Speaker of the New York City Council
- Todd Kaminsky, Member of the New York Senate
- Andy King, Member of New York City Council
- Mark D. Levine, Member of New York City Council
- Joseph D. Morelle, Majority Leader of the New York State Assembly
- Crystal Peoples, Member of the New York State Assembly
- Gustavo Rivera, Member of the New York Senate
- Rafael Salamanca, Member of New York City Council
- Luis R. Sepúlveda, Member of the New York Senate
- José M. Serrano, Member of the New York Senate
- Kathy Sheehan, Mayor of Albany
- Ritchie Torres, Member of New York City Council

U.S. Senators

- Kamala Harris, U.S. Senator from California (2017–2021)

U.S. Representatives

- Joseph Crowley, U.S. Representative, NY-14
- Adriano Espaillat, U.S. Representative, NY-13
- Gregory Meeks, U.S. Representative, NY-5
Sean Patrick Maloney

U.S. Representatives

- Joe Kennedy III, U.S. Representative, MA-04
- Beto O'Rourke, U.S. Representative, TX-16

Organizations

- LGBTQ Victory Fund
- New England Regional Council of Carpenters
Zephyr Teachout

Organizations

- Central Brooklyn Independent Democrats
- Four Freedoms Democratic Club
- Indivisible Brooklyn
- Indivisible Harlem
- Indivisible Upper West Side
- Ithaca Democratic Socialists of America
- Muslim Democratic Club of NY
- New Kings Democrats
- New York Communities for Change
- New York Progressive Action Network
- North Brooklyn Progressive Democrats
- Our Revolution
- People for Bernie
- Progressive Women of Pelham
- Three Parks Democrats

Individuals

- Kerri Evelyn Harris, 2018 candidate for U.S. Senator in Delaware
- Roberta A. Kaplan, lawyer and LGBT activist
- Lawrence Lessig, Harvard Law School professor
- Chirlane McCray, First Lady of New York City
- Cynthia Nixon, 2018 candidate for Governor of New York, actress, and activist
- Alexandria Ocasio-Cortez, Democratic nominee for U.S. Representative from NY-14 in 2018
- Joseph Stiglitz, Nobel Prize-winning Columbia University professor

Local and state politicians

- Tom Abinanti, Member of the New York State Assembly
- Terry Gipson, Former Member of the New York Senate
- Robert Jackson, former Member of the New York City Council
- Liz Krueger, Member of the New York Senate
- Svante Myrick, Mayor of Ithaca
- Phil Steck, Member of the New York State Assembly
- Ritchie Torres, Member of New York City Council
- Jimmy Van Bramer, Member of the New York City Council
- Jumaane Williams, Member of the New York City Council

Media

- The Buffalo News
- The Nation
- New York Daily News
- The New York Times

U.S. Representatives

- Pramila Jayapal, U.S. Representative, WA-7, Former Member of the Washington State Senate from the 37th District
- Ro Khanna, U.S. Representative, CA-17
- John Sarbanes, U.S. Representative, MD-3

U.S. Senators

- Bernie Sanders, U.S. Senator, Vermont

U.S. Cabinet members

- Robert Reich

=== Polling ===
Poll source	Date(s) administered	Sample size	Margin of error	Leecia Eve	Letitia James	Sean Patrick Maloney	Zephyr Teachout	Other	Undecided
Change Research (D)	September 11–12, 2018	844	± 3.5%	3%	27%	26%	28%	–	16%
Siena College	September 4–7, 2018	509	± 4.3%	3%	24%	25%	18%	1%	30%
Siena College	July 22–26, 2018	630	± 3.9%	4%	25%	16%	13%	–	42%
Quinnipiac University	July 12–16, 2018	415	± 6.2%	3%	26%	15%	12%	–	44%

=== Results ===
Results by county: James: 30–40%; 40–50%; 50–60%; 60–70%; Teachout: 30–40%; 40–50%; 50–60%; 60–70%; Maloney: 30–40%; 40–50%; 50–60%

Democratic primary results
Party	Candidate	Votes	%
Democratic	Letitia James	608,308	38.53%
Democratic	Zephyr Teachout	468,083	29.65%
Democratic	Sean Patrick Maloney	379,099	24.02%
Democratic	Leecia Eve	52,367	3.32%
Total votes		1,578,588	100.0%

== Republican primary ==
=== Candidates ===
==== Nominee ====
- Keith Wofford, co-managing partner of Ropes & Gray's New York City office (designated party nominee)

==== Withdrew ====
- Manny Alicandro, corporate attorney from Manhattan (ended Attorney General campaign in May 2018 to run for Comptroller)
- Joe Holland, former Commissioner of the New York Department of Housing and Community Renewal (defeated for Republican nomination; endorsed Republican nominee Keith Wofford)

==== Declined ====
- John P. Cahill, Republican nominee for attorney general in 2014 and former aide to Governor George Pataki
- John DeFrancisco, Deputy Majority Leader of the New York State Senate
- John Katko, U.S. Representative

=== Endorsements ===
Keith Wofford

U.S. Representatives

- Peter T. King, U.S. Representative, NY-02

Local and state politicians

- Brian F. Curran, Member of the New York State Assembly

Organizations

- Associated Builders and Contractors

Newspapers

- The Buffalo News
- The Citizen
- The Daily Gazette
- Jewish Voice
- Watertown Daily Times

== Qualified third parties ==
=== Conservative ===
Conservative Party of New York State chairman Michael R. Long indicated the party would cross-endorse the Republican nominee for attorney general.

- Nominee: Keith Wofford

=== Working Families ===
Nominee: Letitia James. The party endorsed both Letitia James and Zephyr Teachout prior to the September 13 primary election. Kenneth Schaefer, who was nominated as the Working Families Party's dummy candidate, withdrew by October 9 in favor of Democratic nominee Letitia James.

=== Independence Party ===
Nominee: Letitia James. Victor J. Messina Jr., the original nominee, withdrew by October 9 as well.

=== Green Party ===
Nominee: Michael Sussman

=== Reform ===
On May 20, 2018, the Reform Party of New York State authorized four candidates to run for attorney general in its September 13, 2018 primary:

- Preet Bharara, former U.S. Attorney (declined)
- Michael Diederich Jr.
- Christopher B. Garvey, Libertarian Party nominee and perennial candidate
- Nancy Regula, animal rights activist and wife of party chairman Curtis Sliwa

==== Results ====
Reform primary results
Party	Candidate	Votes	%
Reform	Nancy Sliwa	13,643	53.3
Reform	Michael Diederich, Jr.	6,005	23.5
Reform	Christopher B. Garvey	5,949	23.2
Total votes		25,597	100.0

== Other third parties ==
=== Libertarian ===
- Christopher B. Garvey

== General election ==
=== Predictions ===
Source	Ranking	As of
Governing	Likely D	October 26, 2018

=== Polling ===
Poll source	Date(s) administered	Sample size	Margin of error	Letitia James (D)	Keith Wofford (R)	Other	Undecided
Siena College	October 28 – November 1, 2018	641	± 3.9%	49%	37%	0%	14%
McLaughlin & Associates (R-Wofford)	September 27–30, 2018	600	± 4.0%	44%	33%	4%	20%
Siena College	September 20–27, 2018	701	± 3.9%	50%	36%	1%	14%

=== Results ===
Letitia James (D) went on to easily win the election, with 62% of the vote versus Wofford's (R) 35%. James became the first woman and the first African-American to be elected New York Attorney General.

New York Attorney General election, 2018
Party	Candidate	Votes	%	±%
Democratic	Letitia James	3,497,213	58.35%	+10.17
Working Families	Letitia James	152,350	2.54%	−2.01
Independence	Letitia James	89,676	1.50%	−1.49
Total	Letitia James	3,739,239	62.39%	+6.68
Republican	Keith Wofford	1,851,510	30.89%	−3.07
Conservative	Keith Wofford	257,090	4.29%	−3.17
Total	Keith Wofford	2,108,600	35.18%	−6.24
Green	Michael Sussman	72,512	1.21%	−0.97
Libertarian	Christopher Garvey	43,767	0.73%	+0.06
Reform	Nancy Sliwa	26,441	0.44%	N/A
Write-ins		2,958	0.05%	+0.02
Total votes		5,993,517	100.0%	
Democratic hold				

==== By congressional district ====
James won 23 of 27 congressional districts, including three that elected Republicans, with the remaining four going to Wofford, including one that elected a Democrat.

District	James	Wofford	Representative
1st	49.1%	49.0%	Lee Zeldin
2nd	50%	48%	Peter T. King
3rd	56%	42%	Thomas Suozzi
4th	57%	41%	Kathleen Rice
5th	89%	10%	Gregory Meeks
6th	69%	28%	Grace Meng
7th	89%	8%	Nydia Velázquez
8th	89%	10%	Hakeem Jeffries
9th	88%	10%	Yvette Clarke
10th	81%	17%	Jerry Nadler
11th	52%	46%	Max Rose
12th	83%	14%	Carolyn Maloney
13th	94%	5%	Adriano Espaillat
14th	82%	16%	Alexandria Ocasio Cortez
15th	95%	4%	Jose E. Serrano
16th	77%	21%	Eliot Engel
17th	63%	34%	Nita Lowey
18th	52%	45%	Sean Patrick Maloney
19th	49%	47%	Antonio Delgado
20th	56%	41%	Paul Tonko
21st	43%	54%	Elise Stefanik
22nd	44%	53%	Anthony Brindisi
23rd	42%	54%	Tom Reed
24th	51%	46%	John Katko
25th	56%	41%	Joe Morelle
26th	58%	39%	Brian Higgins
27th	36%	61%	Chris Collins
