= 2018 United States Senate election in Delaware =

- November 6, 2018
- Turnout: 52.18%
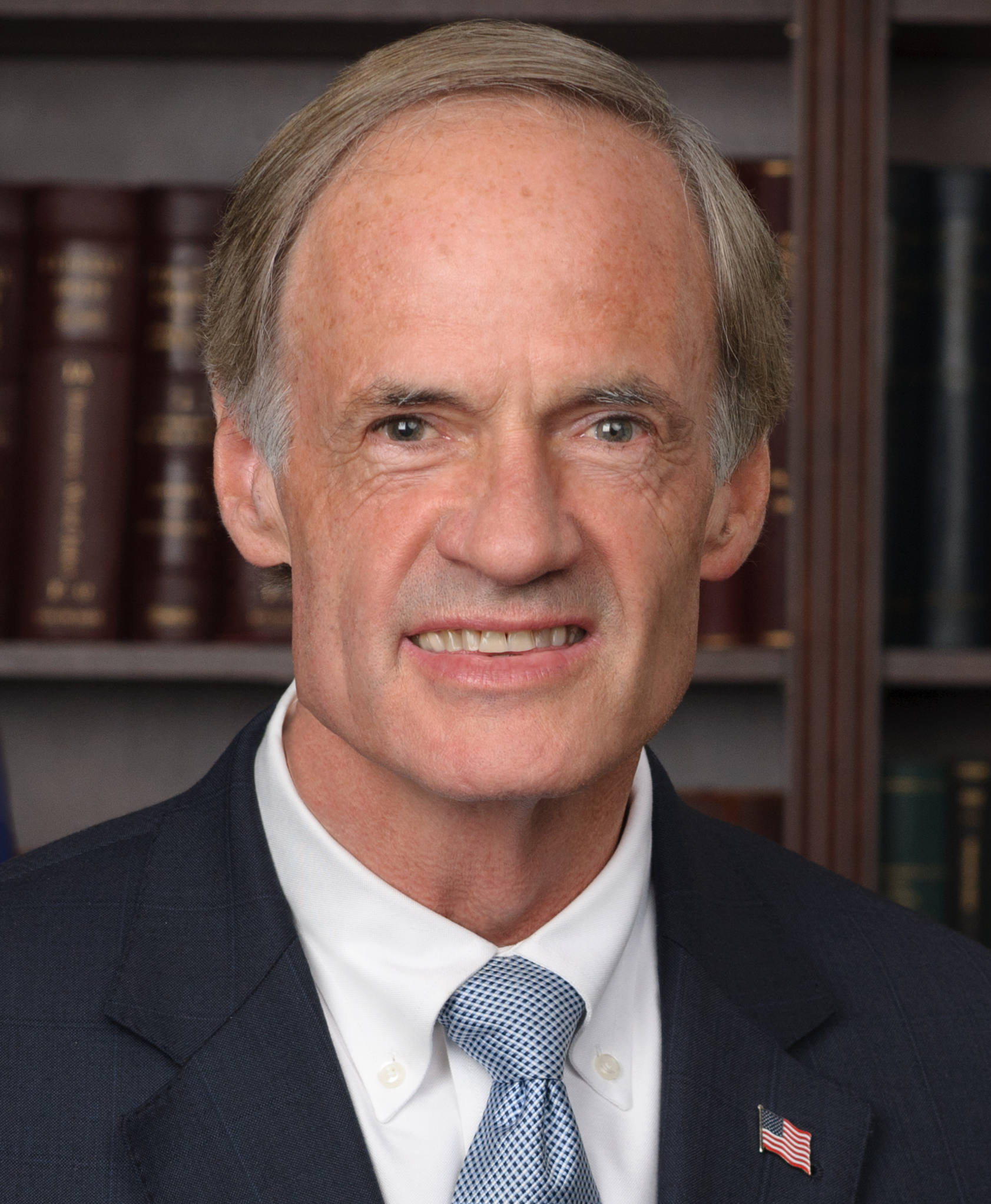

Nominee	Tom Carper	Rob Arlett
Party	Democratic	Republican
Popular vote	217,385	137,127
Percentage	59.95%	37.81%
- Carper: 40–50% 50–60% 60–70% 70–80% 80–90% >90% Arlett: 40–50% 50–60% 60–70% 70–80% No data
U.S. senator before election
Tom Carper
Democratic
Elected U.S. Senator
Tom Carper
Democratic

The 2018 United States Senate election in Delaware took place on November 6, 2018, to elect a member of the United States Senate to represent the State of Delaware, concurrently with other elections to the United States Senate, elections to the United States House of Representatives, and various state and local elections.

The primary for this U.S. Senate election was held on Thursday, September 6, 2018. The Democratic Party nominated incumbent U.S. Senator Tom Carper and the Republican Party nominated Sussex County Councilman Rob Arlett.

Incumbent Democratic Senator Tom Carper was re-elected to a fourth, and ultimately final, term. Despite Carper's victory, Arlett managed to flip Sussex County, typically a reliably Republican county in Delaware. This subsequently marked the first time Carper lost the county since his first election to the Senate in 2000.

== Background ==
Three-term Democratic Senator Tom Carper was reelected with 66% of the vote in 2012 against Republican Kevin Wade.

Carper, the incumbent U.S. senator, was challenged in the Democratic primary by Dover activist Kerri Evelyn Harris. Carper previously faced a primary challenge in the 2012 election from businessman Keith Spanarelli. However, Carper defeated Spanarelli by around 70 points. Carper went on to defeat Harris by around 30 points. It was the most competitive Democratic U.S. Senate primary in Delaware in two decades.

The main declared candidates in the Republican primary were Sussex County councilman Rob Arlett and businessman Gene Truono, with a perennial candidacy from businessman Rocky De La Fuente, who also ran for Senate in seven other states. Another candidate withdrew before the primary. Rob Arlett defeated Gene Truono in a landslide to win the Republican nomination.

== Democratic primary ==
=== Candidates ===
==== Nominee ====
- Tom Carper, incumbent U.S. senator and 71st governor of Delaware

==== Eliminated in primary ====
- Kerri Evelyn Harris, Dover activist and U.S. Air Force veteran

==== Withdrew ====
- Tykiem Booker, activist

==== Declined ====
- Lisa Blunt Rochester, U.S. representative (ran for re-election)

=== Endorsements ===
Tom Carper

U.S. executive branch officials

- Joe Biden, 47th Vice President of the United States

U.S. senators

- Cory Booker, U.S. senator from New Jersey

U.S. representatives

- Gabby Giffords, former U.S. representative, AZ-08

State executive branch officials

- Rita Landgraf, former Secretary of Delaware Health and Social Services

State legislators

- Debra Heffernan, Delaware state representative

Individuals

- Matthew Albright, moderator of the Democratic primary debate
- Sandra Hall, 2016 Delaware Teacher of the Year
- Douglas E. Krantz, rabbi
- Sonia Schorr Sloan, former Delaware president of the board of Planned Parenthood
- Jon Soltz, chairman of VoteVets

Organizations

- AFL-CIO
- Delaware Laborers
- Delaware State Education Association
- Democratic Party
- Eastern Sussex Democratic Club
- Giffords Gun Safety Organization
- Human Rights Campaign
- J Street
- League of Conservation Voters
- NRDC Action Fund
- Planned Parenthood
- Stonewall Democrats
- VoteVets

Newspapers

- The News Journal
Kerri Evelyn Harris

State legislators

- Sean Lynn, Delaware state representative
- Ilhan Omar, Minnesota state representative and Democratic nominee for Minnesota's 5th congressional district
- Nina Turner, former Ohio State Senator and President of Our Revolution

County councilpersons

- Jea Street, New Castle County councilman

City Councilpersons

- Ayanna Pressley, Boston City councilwoman and Democratic nominee for Massachusetts' 7th congressional district
- Jen Wallace, Newark city councilwoman

Political candidates

- Don Allan, Democratic nominee for Delaware’s 36th representative district
- Adrienne Bell, Democratic nominee for Texas's 14th congressional district
- Dee Durham, Democratic nominee for New Castle County's 2nd council district
- Alexandria Ocasio-Cortez, Democratic nominee for New York's 14th congressional district
- Jordyn Pusey, Democratic candidate for New Castle County’s 1st council district
- Demitri Theodoropoulos, Green nominee for the seat

Individuals

- Kate Aronoff, journalist
- Dan Cantor, chairman of the Working Families Party
- Garrison Davis, community organizer
- Joe Dinkin, campaign director of the Working Families Party
- Mike Figueredo, host of The Humanist Report
- Glenn Greenwald, journalist
- Ryan Grim, journalist
- Coby Owens, social justice activist, CEO of Youth Caucus of America, and 2016 delegate for Bernie Sanders
- Gerald Rocha, retired U.S. Air Force veteran and youth advocate
- Kendrick Sampson, actor
- Claire Sandberg, former deputy campaign manager for El-Sayed gubernatorial campaign and former director of distributed organizing for Sanders presidential campaign
- Jea Street, Jr., singer and son of New Castle County Councilman Jea Street
- Cenk Uygur, co-founder and co-host of The Young Turks
- Emma Vigeland, co-host of The Majority Report
- Winnie Wong, co-founder of The People for Bernie Sanders

Organizations

- Blue Delaware
- Center for Popular Democracy
- Common Defense
- Delaware for Bernie
- Delaware United
- Demand Universal Healthcare
- Democratic Socialists of Delaware
- Democracy for America
- Higher Heights PAC
- Justice Democrats
- Our Revolution
- The People for Bernie Sanders
- Progressive Action Network
- Progressive Democrats for Delaware
- Working Families Party
- Working Hero PAC

Media

- Delaware Liberal
- The Young Turks
Declined to endorse

Declined to endorse either candidate

- Tykiem Booker, former candidate
- Chris Johnson, Democratic candidate for attorney general
- Keith Spanarelli, candidate for the seat in 2012
- Laura Sturgeon, Democratic nominee for Delaware's 4th Senate district

=== Debates ===
Delaware newspaper The News Journal hosted a 90-minute debate on August 27, 2018, for the Democratic primary between Tom Carper and Kerri Evelyn Harris at Cab Calloway School of the Arts. Republican candidate businessman Gene Truono answered questions from panelists before Carper and Harris debated. Sussex County Councilman Rob Arlett was also invited, but declined and claimed he had a scheduling conflict.

- Full video of debate, Facebook

=== Polling ===
Poll source	Date(s) administered	Sample size	Margin of error	Tom Carper	Kerri Evelyn Harris	Undecided
Gravis Marketing	July 24–29, 2018	354	± 5.2%	51%	19%	30%

=== Results ===
Results by county Carper—60–70%

Democratic primary results
Party	Candidate	Votes	%
Democratic	Tom Carper (incumbent)	53,633	64.59%
Democratic	Kerri Evelyn Harris	29,406	35.41%
Total votes		83,039	100.00%

== Republican primary ==
=== Candidates ===
==== Nominee ====
- Rob Arlett, former Sussex County Councilman, and former Delaware State Chairman for the Trump campaign

==== Eliminated in primary ====
- Rocky De La Fuente, businessman and perennial candidate
- Gene Truono, businessman and former chief compliance officer at PayPal

==== Withdrew ====
- Chuck Boyce, businessman (endorsed Rob Arlett)

==== Declined ====
- Ken Simpler, State Treasurer (running for re-election)
- Kevin Wade, businessman and candidate for Senate in 2012 and 2014 (endorsed Rob Arlett)

=== Endorsements ===
Rob Arlett

Former 2018 U.S. Senate election, Delaware candidates

- Chuck Boyce, businessman

Political candidates

- Tom Neuberger, former Republican candidate for Delaware Attorney General in 2018
- Kevin Wade, former Republican nominee for U.S. Senate in Delaware in 2012 and 2014

Individuals

- Carter Clark, SC Teenage Republican chairman
- Jesse Glanden, wrestling coach at Laurel High School
- Bobby Halton, former firefighter
- Charlie Kirk, founder and president of Turning Point USA
- Bobby Knight, former basketball coach
- Michael F. McMahon, former FBI unit chief and US naval officer
- Frank Ricci (Ricci v. DeStefano)
Gene Truono

State legislators

- Greg Lavelle, Delaware state senator

Republican Party officials

- Peter Kopf, New Castle County Republican chairman

Political candidates

- Lee Murphy, actor and Republican candidate for U.S. House of Representatives in Delaware

Individuals

- Mitch Denham, Delaware Gun Rights
- John Foltz, 11th District chairman
- David Gilefski, Western NCC Region chairman
- Shawn Michael Greener, radio host
- Dick Heller (District of Columbia v. Heller)
- Mark Keith Robinson, NRA affiliate
- Maj Toure, Black Guns Matter

Organizations

- Delaware Gun Rights
- Never Carper
- The News Journal Editorial Board
- Revitalize Delaware
- U.S. Term Limits
Declined to endorse

Declined to endorse either candidate

- Republican Party

=== Debates ===
Councilman Rob Arlett and businessman Gene Truono had four debates in total. They were normally live streamed on Facebook and uploaded to YouTube. A fifth debate was planned, but Truono withdrew from the debate because the organizers refused to give him control over what questions could not be asked. Instead organizers held a forum with all the other candidates for the U.S. Senate and other state offices. Five candidates attended that forum.

- First debate, YouTube
- Second debate, Part 1, YouTube
- Second debate, Part 2, YouTube
- Third debate, Part 1, YouTube
- Third debate, Part 2, YouTube
- Fourth debate, YouTube

=== Polling ===
Poll source	Date(s) administered	Sample size	Margin of error	Rob Arlett	Rocky De La Fuente	Gene Truono	Undecided
Gravis Marketing	July 24–29, 2018	288	± 5.8%	19%	7%	15%	60%

=== Results ===
Results by county Map legend: Arlett—70–80%; Arlett—60–70%; Arlett—50–60%

Republican primary results
Party	Candidate	Votes	%
Republican	Rob Arlett	25,284	66.77%
Republican	Gene Truono	10,587	27.96%
Republican	Rocky De La Fuente	1,998	5.28%
Total votes		37,869	100.00%

== Green primary ==
=== Candidates ===
==== Nominee ====
- Demitri Theodoropoulos, small business owner

==== Declined ====
- Andrew Groff, businessman and perennial candidate

=== Endorsements ===
Demitri Theodoropoulos

Organizations

- Green Party

== Libertarian primary ==
=== Candidates ===
==== Nominee ====
- Nadine Frost, New Castle County chairwoman of Libertarian Party of Delaware and Libertarian nominee for Wilmington City Council in 2016

== Independents ==
Not to be confused with the Independent Party of Delaware, which did not run a candidate for the 2018 United States Senate election.

=== Candidates ===
==== Declared ====
- Barry Eveland (write-in)
- Todd Farina, ticket company owner (write-in)
- Matthew Water Stout, write-in presidential candidate in 2016 (write-in)

== General election ==
=== Endorsements ===
Bold text indicates endorsement was given before the primary.

Tom Carper

U.S. executive branch officials

- **Joe Biden, 47th vice president of the United States**

U.S. senators

- **Cory Booker, U.S. senator from New Jersey**
- Chris Coons, U.S. senator from Delaware

U.S. representatives

- **Gabby Giffords, former U.S. representative, AZ-08**
- Lisa Blunt Rochester, U.S. representative from Delaware

Governors

- John Carney, 74th Governor of Delaware

Other state executive branch officials

- Matt Denn, Delaware State Attorney General
- **Rita Landgraf, former Secretary of Delaware Health and Social Services**

State legislators

- **Debra Heffernan, Delaware state representative**

Political candidates

- Ray Seigfried, former vice president of Christiana Care and Democratic nominee for Delaware’s 7th House district
- Laura Sturgeon, Democratic nominee for Delaware’s 4th Senate district

Individuals

- **Matthew Albright, moderator of the Democratic primary debate**
- **Sandra Hall, 2016 Delaware Teacher of the Year**
- **Douglas E. Krantz, rabbi**
- **Sonia Schorr Sloan, former Delaware president of the board of Planned Parenthood**
- **Jon Soltz, chairman of VoteVets**
- Laura Thein, former Disabilities Caucus Chair of Young Democrats of America

Organizations

- **AFL-CIO**
- **Delaware Laborers**
- **Delaware State Education Association**
- **Democratic Party**
- **Eastern Sussex Democratic Club**
- **Giffords Gun Safety Organization**
- **Human Rights Campaign**
- **J Street**
- **League of Conservation Voters**
- **The News Journal Editorial Board**
- Moms Demand Action for Gun Sense in America
- National Committee to Preserve Social Security and Medicare
- National Wildlife Federation
- **NRDC Action Fund**
- Patriot Majority
- **Planned Parenthood**
- Sierra Club
- **Stonewall Democrats**
- UD College Democrats
- **VoteVets**
Rob Arlett

Former 2018 U.S. Senate election, Delaware candidates

- **Chuck Boyce, businessman**

Political candidates

- **Tom Neuberger, former Republican candidate for Delaware Attorney General in 2018**
- **Kevin Wade, former Republican nominee for U.S. Senate in Delaware in 2012 and 2014**
- Andrew Webb, Republican write-in candidate for U.S. House in Delaware

Individuals

- **Carter Clark, SC Teenage Republican chairman**
- **Jesse Glanden, wrestling coach at Laurel High School**
- **Bobby Halton, former firefighter**
- **Charlie Kirk, founder and president of Turning Point USA**
- **Bobby Knight, former basketball coach**
- **Michael F. McMahon, former FBI unit chief and US naval officer**
- **Frank Ricci (Ricci v. DeStefano)**

Organizations

- Republican Party
Demitri Theodoropoulos

Organizations

- **Green Party**

Media

- Hijacked Radio Podcast
- The Politics of Courage
Declined to endorse

Declined to endorse Tom Carper

- Tykiem Booker, former candidate
- Kerri Evelyn Harris, former candidate
- Coby Owens, social justice activist, CEO of Youth Caucus of America, and 2016 delegate for Bernie Sanders
- Justice Democrats

Declined to endorse Rob Arlett

- Peter Kopf, former New Castle County Republican chairman
- Gene Truono, former candidate

=== Debates ===
with Kerri Evelyn Harris and Gene Truono
On August 20, 2018, the Greater Hockessin Area Development Association (GHADA) hosted a two-hour debate at the Hockessin Memorial Hall between Democratic candidate Kerri Evelyn Harris and Republican candidate Gene Truono. Tom Carper and Rob Arlett were also invited to the debate, but did not attend. Carper was not present because of the U.S. Senate's extended session due to session ceasing early the Thursday prior because of the death of former governor and U.S. Senator of Nevada, Paul Laxalt. Arlett declined and claimed he had a scheduling conflict.

- Full video of debate, Facebook August 20, 2018

with Tom Carper and Rob Arlett
The debate gained national attention after Republican candidate Rob Arlett brought up Democratic senator Tom Carper’s past controversy of domestic abuse.

- Full video of debate, C-SPAN October 17, 2018

with Tom Carper, Rob Arlett, Nadine Frost, and Demitri Theodoropoulos

- Full video of debate, WHYY October 30, 2018

=== Predictions ===
Source	Ranking	As of
The Cook Political Report	Safe D	October 26, 2018
Inside Elections	Safe D	November 1, 2018
Sabato's Crystal Ball	Safe D	November 5, 2018
Daily Kos	Safe D	April 9, 2018
Fox News	Likely D	July 9, 2018
CNN	Safe D	July 12, 2018
RealClearPolitics	Safe D	June 2018
FiveThirtyEight	Safe D	September 2018

=== Polling ===
Poll source	Date(s) administered	Sample size	Margin of error	Tom Carper (D)	Rob Arlett (R)	Nadine Frost (L)	Demitri Theodoropoulos (G)	Undecided
University of Delaware	September 11–17, 2018	728 LV	–	**61%**	24%	3%	3%	9%
University of Delaware	September 11–17, 2018	908 RV	± 3.7%	**60%**	22%	5%	2%	12%
Gravis Marketing	July 24–29, 2018	884	± 3.3%	**47%**	39%	–	–	14%

Hypothetical polling

with Tom Carper and Gene Truono

Poll source	Date(s) administered	Sample size	Margin of error	Tom Carper (D)	Gene Truono (R)	Undecided
Gravis Marketing	July 24–29, 2018	884	± 3.3%	**47%**	38%	15%

with Kerri Evelyn Harris and Rob Arlett

Poll source	Date(s) administered	Sample size	Margin of error	Kerri Evelyn Harris (D)	Rob Arlett (R)	Undecided
Gravis Marketing	July 24–29, 2018	884	± 3.3%	**42%**	35%	23%

with Kerri Evelyn Harris and Gene Truono

Poll source	Date(s) administered	Sample size	Margin of error	Kerri Evelyn Harris (D)	Gene Truono (R)	Undecided
Gravis Marketing	July 24–29, 2018	884	± 3.3%	**40%**	37%	23%

=== Results ===
United States Senate election in Delaware, 2018
Party	Candidate	Votes	%	±%
**Democratic**	**Tom Carper (incumbent)**	**217,385**	**59.95%**	**−6.47%**
Republican	Rob Arlett	137,127	37.81%	+8.85%
Green	Demitri Theodoropoulos	4,170	1.15%	+0.35%
Libertarian	Nadine Frost	3,910	1.09%	N/A
Total votes		**362,592**	**100.00%**	N/A
Democratic **hold**				

==== By county ====
County	Tom Carper Democratic		Robert Arlett Republican		All Others	
County	#	%	#	%	#	%
Kent	**31,282**	**52.35**	27,210	45.54	1,261	2.11
New Castle	**145,428**	**69.15**	59,526	28.3	5,369	2.56
Sussex	40,675	43.96	**50,675**	**54.46**	1,464	1.69
Totals	**217,385**	**59.95**	137,127	37.82	8,080	1.23

Counties that flipped from Democratic to Republican

- Sussex (largest city: Seaford)

== See also ==
- 2018 United States Senate elections
- Elections in Delaware
