= Jamie McGonnigal =

American voice actor

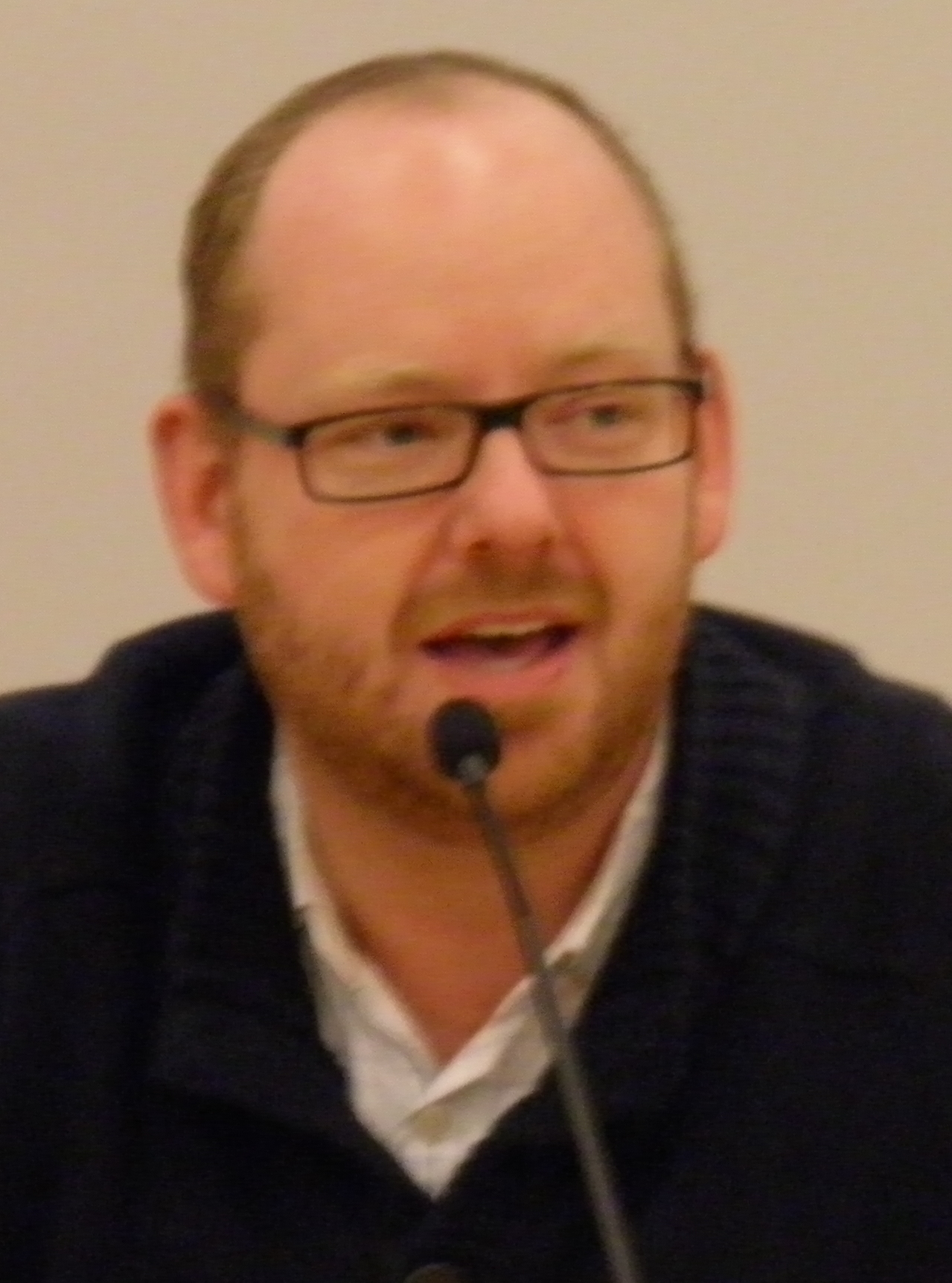
- McGonnigal at Katori-Con in 2012
- Born: James Campbell McGonnigal; August 6, 1975 (age 51); Weymouth, Massachusetts, U.S.
- Occupations: Voice actor; ADR director
- Spouse: Sean Carlson (m. 2013)
- Website: jamiemcg.me

James Campbell McGonnigal (born August 6, 1975) is an American voice actor.

== Biography ==
As the founding Artistic Producer of The World AIDS Day Concerts and as a Founding Producer of the New York Musical Theatre Festival, McGonnigal presented the New York Premiere of Stephen Schwartz' Children of Eden, the first major NY revisitation of Pippin starring Rosie O'Donnell, Laura Benanti, Michael Arden, and Ben Vereen, Snoopy The Musical (starring Tony Award-Winner Sutton Foster), The Secret Garden starring Laura Benanti, Will Chase, and Stephen Pasquale (named in top ten theatre events of 2005 by Playbill.com), Rags at Nokia Theatre Times Square (starring Lainie Kazan, Carolee Carmello, and Eden Espinosa), and the first major revival of the cult hit Runaways by Elizabeth Swados starring Ezra Miller, Max Jenkins, and Alex Brightman. His FLOPZ n' CUTZ series benefiting the Joey DiPaolo AIDS Foundation was declared a "smash" by New York's NEXT Magazine. Named a "musical theatre impresario" by Time Out New York, he has produced and/or directed more than 100 events for The Matthew Shepard Foundation, God's Love We Deliver, Broadway Cares/Equity Fights AIDS, Parkinson's Resource Organization, The National AIDS Fund, Opening Act, The Pied Piper Children's Theatre, Victims of Hurricane Katrina, Free Arts NYC, The United Nations Association HERO Campaign and Victims of the 2008 Midwest Flooding. His work has earned him National recognition as well as a special award from The 2006 New England Theatre Conference.

In 2007, McGonnigal traveled to South Africa and Namibia as an ambassador for the United Nations' HERO campaign assisting remote AIDS-affected communities. He also served on the board of directors for the Joey DiPaolo AIDS Foundation and acted as camp director for Camp TLC, a summer camp for inner city teens living with HIV/AIDS [www.jdaf.org] from 2005 to 2008. Additionally in 2007, McGonnigal founded the Broadway Loves the 80s Concerts, hosted by Mo Rocca and featuring performances from Jamie-Lynn Sigler, Kate Shindle, Michael Urie, Becki Newton, Julia Murney and Tony Vincent.

Inspired by the passing of California's Proposition 8, McGonnigal began discussions with several leaders in the LGBT Community and started the website talkaboutequality.

In 2010, McGonnigal founded Take Back Pride, a campaign to put the elements of activism back in Pride Marches around the country. The movement has now swept 17 cities and 4 countries thus far.

McGonnigal moved to Hyattsville, Maryland in 2014, where he lives with his husband and son. For four years, McGonnigal served as the Community Director for the New Organizing Institute, where he led RootsCamp, an annual progressive political conference. He has served in fundraising and sales leadership roles at SOCAP, Impactive, Neighborhood Economics and Mobile Commons since 2015. He served as PTA President for Hyattsville Elementary School and continues to serve on the PTA Board. And currently serves on the advisory board for Voters of Tomorrow and recently ran for Prince George's County Public Schools Board of Education in District 3.

== Filmography ==
=== Animation ===
- Arcade Gamer Fubuki - Sanpeita
- Beck: Mongolian Chop Squad - Yoshito Morozumi
- Big Windup! - Shuugo Kanou
- Chaotic - Hot Shot, Vlar
- El Cazador de la Bruja - L.A.
- (King of Braves): GaoGaiGar - Penchinon
- Gokusen - Haruhiko "Uchi" Uchiyama
- Huntik: Secrets & Seekers - Tersely
- Kizuna: Bonds of Love - Ranmaru Samejima
- Jungle Emperor Leo - Lemonade
- Nabari no Ō - Additional Voices
- Magic User's Club - Takeo Takakura
- Mobile Suit Gundam Unicorn - Additional Voices
- MoonPhase - Additional Voices
- One Piece - Eyelash, Kuromarimo (4Kids dub), Corporal (Episodes 136 - 138) (Funimation dub),
- Patlabor - Bud Renard
- Peach Girl - Nao
- RIN: Daughters of Mnemosyne - Yahagi
- World of Narue - Kazuto Iizuka
- Three Delivery - Eugene
- Viva Piñata - Teddington Twingersnap
- Weiß Kreuz - Omi Tsukiyono
- Weiß Kreuz Kreuz: Gluhen - Omi Tsukiyono
- Weathering Continent - Tieh
- Winx Club: The Magic Is Back - Damien

=== Video games ===
- Shadow Hearts: From the New World (PS2) - Johnny Garland, Roy McManus
- Bullet Witch (Xbox 360) - Jonathan
- Viva Pinata (Xbox 360) - Teddington Twingersnaps

== Production staff ==
=== Producer/director (theater) ===
- Runaways
- Broadway Loves Joe's Pub
- Green Concert (Makor Theatre 2006 & 2007)
- Green 2 Concert (Makor Theatre 2006 & 2007)
- NEO Concert (York Theatre Company 2003)
- Broadway Loves the 80's (Volumes 1, 2, 3, 4 and 5 at Joe's Pub - 2007, 2008, 2009)
- Embrace! Concerts for The Matthew Shepard Foundation-2004, 2005, 2006
- Standing Ovations 1, 2 & 3 for Broadway Cares/Equity Fights AIDS
- Miracle Concerts for God's Love We Deliver 2003, 2004, 2005, 2006
- FLOPZ & CUTZ Series 2005, 2006, 2007, 2008, 2009
- ASS BACKWARDS AKA Glory Days In Concert at Joe's Pub 2007
- Become, the Music of Pasek & Paul, a concert featuring the music of Benj Pasek and Justin Paul Joe's Pub 2005
- Laura Benanti: Blame It On My Youth at Feinstein's 2006
- Laura Bell Bundy in Shameless! Joe's Pub, 2004

=== Artistic producer/other ===
- World AIDS Day Concerts
- Children of Eden - 2003, Pippin - 2004, The Secret Garden - 2005, Rags - 2006
