= Justice Democrats =

American political action committee

- Abbreviation: JD
- Formation: January 23, 2017; 9 years ago
- Founders: Saikat Chakrabarti; Zack Exley; Kyle Kulinski; Cenk Uygur
- Type: Political action committee, caucus
- Registration no.: C00630665
- Headquarters: Knoxville, Tennessee, U.S.
- Key people: Saikat Chakrabarti; Zack Exley; Tara Reilly; Alexandra Rojas, Executive Director
- Affiliations: Brand New Congress; National Nurses United; Former affiliation: The Young Turks
- Revenue: $1.46 million (2017)
- Disbursements: $1.32 million
- Website: justicedemocrats.com

Justice Democrats
- Founded: 2017
- Ideology: Social democracy Democratic socialism Left-wing populism Anti-imperialism Progressivism
- Political position: Left-wing
- Members in the House of Representatives: 9 / 435 (Note: Serving as members of the Democratic Party.)

Justice Democrats (JD) is an American progressive political action committee and caucus founded on January 23, 2017, by two leaders of Bernie Sanders's 2016 presidential campaign, Saikat Chakrabarti and Zack Exley, as well as political commentators Kyle Kulinski and Cenk Uygur of The Young Turks. The organization formed as a result of the 2016 United States presidential election and aspires "to elect a new type of Democratic majority in Congress" that will "create a thriving economy and democracy that works for the people, not big money interests". The group advocates for campaign finance reform (reducing the role of money in politics) and endorses only candidates who pledge to refuse donations from corporate PACs and lobbyists.

Kulinski and Uygur are no longer members of the group, later criticizing its failure to unite lawmakers behind key bills. Alexandra Rojas became the organization's executive director in May 2018.

During the 2018 elections, Justice Democrats ran 79 progressive candidates against Democrats, Republicans and Independents in local, state, and federal elections. The seven Justice Democrats candidates who won their electoral congressional races in 2018 were Raúl Grijalva, Pramila Jayapal, Ro Khanna, Alexandria Ocasio-Cortez, Ilhan Omar, Ayanna Pressley, and Rashida Tlaib.

The group endorsed considerably fewer candidates in 2020 than in 2018, a move its communications director Waleed Shahid defended as a strategy to focus its resources on the most promising candidates. Jamaal Bowman, Cori Bush, and Marie Newman were elected to the U.S. House of Representatives in 2020.

In 2022, Greg Casar and Summer Lee were elected to the House, while Newman lost her reelection in the Democratic primary after facing an investigation by the House Ethics Committee. In 2024, Delia Ramirez was endorsed by and joined Justice Democrats. Additionally, in 2024 representatives Jamaal Bowman and Cori Bush lost their reelections in their respective primaries.

== History ==
After the 2016 presidential election resulted in a victory for Donald Trump, many progressives pointed to the perceived loyalty of politicians to large donors as a major contributing factor to Hillary Clinton's loss to Trump. These critics contend that a campaign finance model similar to that of Bernie Sanders, whose 2016 presidential campaign was funded by small individual donations, will increase public trust in politicians through increased accountability to their constituents.

On January 23, 2017, Cenk Uygur and Kyle Kulinski founded Justice Democrats with ten others, including former staffers from the Sanders campaign such as its Director of Organizing Technology, Saikat Chakrabarti, and MoveOn.org fundraiser Zack Exley. According to the organization, it seeks to create a left-wing populist movement to support alternative Democratic candidates beginning with the 2018 midterm elections, in order to either defeat the incumbent Democrats or make them more accountable to their constituents. It requires its candidates to take a pledge to refuse financial contributions from billionaires and corporations. In addition, it hoped to rebuild the Democratic Party on a national level and defeat Trump in the 2020 presidential election.

The Democrats used to represent something wonderful – voters. We want you to represent just us, not your donors... [and stand for] justice for the people

— Cenk Uygur explaining the name of the group

On March 20, 2017, Justice Democrats reported that they had received 8,300 nominations and raised $1 million (~$1.29 million in 2025). Also in March 2017, it teamed up with Brand New Congress, a PAC established by former Sanders campaign supporters, to further their goals. By November 1, 2017, they had merged with fellow progressive group AllOfUs.

On May 9, 2017, Representative Ro Khanna of California's 17th congressional district announced that he had become a Justice Democrat, the first sitting member of Congress to join the organization. Over the following year, Raúl Grijalva of Arizona's 3rd congressional district and Pramila Jayapal of Washington's 7th congressional district also joined, bringing the number of sitting representatives in Justice Democrats to three. On December 6, 2017, Justice Democrats announced that Raúl Grijalva of Arizona's 3rd congressional district had joined the group.

On December 22, 2017, it was announced that Uygur had resigned from the organization, after the revelation of previously deleted but archived controversial blog posts he had written. The next day, Kulinski announced that he had stepped down from the organization as he disagreed with staff members who pressed for Uygur's dismissal. He said his decision came as a result of a personal dilemma as he saw the posts in question upon rereading them as satirical.

On April 16, 2018, Justice Democrats announced that Pramila Jayapal of Washington's 7th congressional district had joined the group. During the 2018 elections, Justice Democrats ran 79 progressive candidates against Democrats, Republicans and Independents in local, state, and federal elections. 26 of them advanced past the primary stage. All Justice Democrat candidates running for office were endorsed by The Young Turks, who provided them with a media platform on their interview show Rebel HQ. On January 3, 2019, Alexandria Ocasio-Cortez of New York's 14th congressional district, Ilhan Omar of Minnesota's 5th congressional district, Ayanna Pressley of Massachusetts's 7th congressional district and Rashida Tlaib of Michigan's 13th congressional district were sworn in as members of the House of Representatives and as Justice Democrats.

In 2020, Justice Democrat Marie Newman defeated incumbent representative Dan Lipinski in the 2020 primary for Illinois's 3rd congressional district. Jamaal Bowman defeated incumbent representative Eliot Engel in New York's 16th congressional district's primary. Bowman was also endorsed by Justice Democrats. Another Justice Democrat-endorsed candidate won in Missouri's 1st congressional district, when Cori Bush defeated Representative Lacy Clay.

In the 2026 election cycle, it spent $5.5 million in support of 15 candidates.

=== Summer for Progress ===
In July 2017, several progressive organizations, including Our Revolution, Democratic Socialists of America, National Nurses United, Working Families Party, and Brand New Congress, announced a push to encourage House Democrats to sign on to a #PeoplesPlatform, which meant supporting "eight bills currently in the House of Representatives that will address the concerns of everyday Americans". These eight bills and the topics they address are:

1. Medicare for All: H.R. 676, the Medicare For All Act
2. Free College Tuition: H.R. 1880, the College for All Act of 2017
3. Worker Rights: H.R. 15, the Raise the Wage Act
4. Women's Rights: H.R. 771, the Equal Access to Abortion Coverage in Health Insurance (EACH Woman) Act of 2017
5. Voting Rights: H.R. 2840, the Automatic Voter Registration Act
6. Environmental Justice: H.R. 4114, the Environmental Justice Act of 2017
7. Criminal Justice and Immigrant Rights: H.R. 3227, the Justice Is Not for Sale Act of 2017
8. Taxing Wall Street: H.R. 1144, the Inclusive Prosperity Act

== Ideology and political issues ==
A central priority of Justice Democrats is to effectively eliminate the role of money and conflicts of interests in politics. As such, any candidate running with Justice Democrats must pledge to refuse donations from corporate PACs and lobbyists. Declining money from corporate PACs and supporting Medicare for All have both been described as litmus tests for the organization. Justice Democrats supports publicly funded elections, banning Super PACs, and banning private donations to politicians and campaigns. It also advocates for the reinstatement of provisions of the Voting Rights Act of 1965 and a ban on gerrymandering for partisan gain. Several members have voiced support for a constitutional amendment to remove money from American politics.

To accompany its launch, Kulinski and Uygur published the following set of progressive founding principles for the coalition. Adjustments have been made since 2017, resulting in a slightly different platform appearing on the Justice Democrats webpage at a given time.

- Creating a new infrastructure program called the "Green New Deal"
- Ending arms sales to countries that it says violate human rights such as Saudi Arabia, Israel and Egypt
- Enacting a federal job guarantee, which would promise all Americans a job paying $15 per hour plus benefits
- Ending the death penalty
- Ending the practice of unilaterally waging war, except as a last resort to defend U.S. territory
- Ending the war on drugs in favor of legalization, regulation, and taxation of drugs, and pardoning all non-violent drug offenders and treating all drug addicts
- Ensuring free speech on college campuses and supporting net neutrality
- Ensuring universal education as a right, including free four-year public college and university education
- Ensuring universal healthcare as a right
- Establishing paid maternity leave, paid vacation leave, and free childcare
- Expanding anti-discrimination laws to apply to LGBT people
- Expanding background checks on firearms and banning high capacity magazines and assault weapons
- Funding Planned Parenthood and other contraceptive and abortion services, and recognizing reproductive rights
- Implementing electoral reform and publicly financed elections nationwide to make irrelevant and obsolete fundraising from large corporations and the wealthy
- Implementing instant-runoff voting nationwide in an effort to make third-party and independent candidates more viable
- Implementing the Buffett Rule, ending offshore financial centers, "chain[ing]" the capital gains and income taxes, and increasing the estate tax
- Making the minimum wage a living wage and tying it to inflation
- Pardoning Edward Snowden, prosecuting CIA torturers and DoD war criminals, shutting down the Guantanamo Bay detention camp and all other extrajudicial prisons, and ending warrantless spying and bulk data collection by the National Security Agency
- Passing the Paycheck Fairness Act
- Abolishing the U.S. Immigration and Customs Enforcement (ICE) agency
- Reforming police by mandating body cameras, establishing community oversight boards, eliminating broken windows policing, ending stop and frisk, and appointing special prosecutors to hold police accountable in courts
- Renegotiating CAFTA-DR and NAFTA, and opposing Permanent Normal Trade Relations with China and the World Trade Organization
- Stopping any reductions to Social Security, Medicare, and Medicaid, and establishing single-payer universal healthcare
- Stopping anthropogenic climate change through an ecological revolution and upholding the United States' participation in the Paris Climate Agreement
- Uncompromisingly rejecting President Trump's immigration proposals and policies, particularly Executive Order 13769 and deportation of illegal immigrants, and implementing comprehensive immigration reform which will include giving non-criminal illegal immigrants a path to citizenship

== Members ==
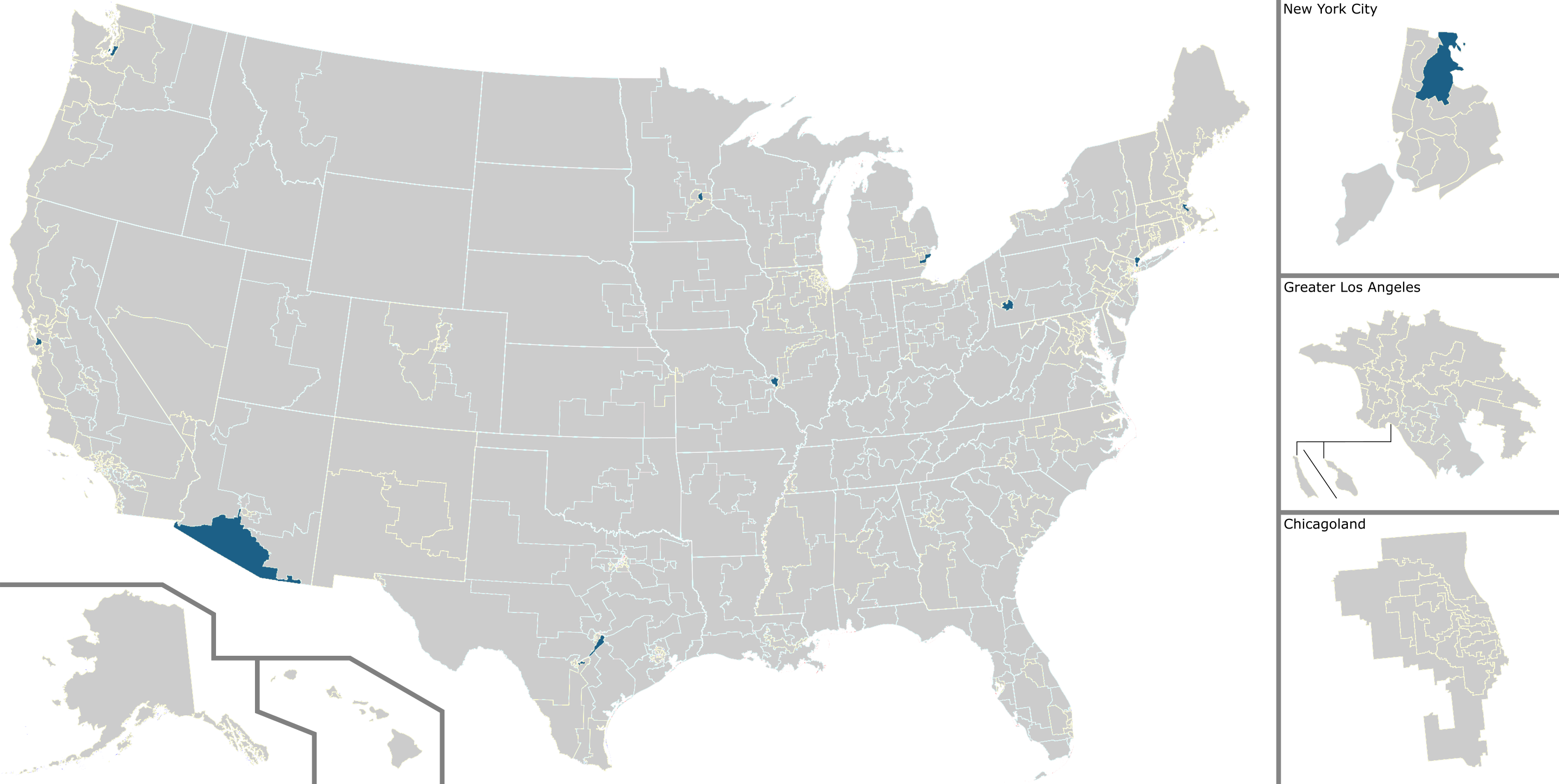
Justice Democrats in the 118th United States Congress

All Congressional Justice Democrats members are House of Representatives members from the Democratic Party. As of the 119th Congress, there are 9 declared Justice Democrats, all of whom are House members.

=== United States House of Representatives ===
==== Current (9) ====
Name	State	District	Tenure
Ro Khanna	California	CA–17	since 2017
Pramila Jayapal	Washington	WA–7	since 2017 (Note: Jayapal joined the Justice Democrats in April 2018.)
Alexandria Ocasio-Cortez	New York	NY-14	since 2019
Ilhan Omar	Minnesota	MN–5	since 2019
Ayanna Pressley	Massachusetts	MA–7	since 2019
Rashida Tlaib	Michigan	MI-13, MI-12	since 2019
Greg Casar	Texas	TX–35	since 2023
Summer Lee	Pennsylvania	PA–12	since 2023
Delia Ramirez	Illinois	IL–3	since 2023 (Note: Ramirez joined the Justice Democrats in January 2024.)

==== Former (4) ====
Name	State	District	Tenure	Reason
Marie Newman	Illinois	IL–3	2021–2023	Lost Primary
Jamaal Bowman	New York	NY-16	2021–2025	Lost Primary
Cori Bush	Missouri	MO-1	2021–2025	Lost Primary
Raúl Grijalva	Arizona	AZ–7, AZ–3	2003–2025 (Note: Grijalva joined the Justice Democrats in December 2017.)	Died

== Political activity ==
=== 2018 ===
Justice Democrats officially endorsed 79 candidates in the 2018 election cycle, seven of whom won general elections (three were incumbents). The four first-time officeholders in the U.S. House make up "The Squad".

Governor
Candidate	State	Office	Primary			General	
Candidate	State	Office	Date	Result	Votes	Result	Votes
Ben Jealous	Maryland	Governor of Maryland	June 26, 2018	Won	39.59%	Lost	43.51%
Abdul El-Sayed	Michigan	Governor of Michigan	August 7, 2018	Lost	30.24%	Did not qualify	N/A
Cynthia Nixon	(New York (state)) New York	Governor of New York	September 13, 2018	Lost	34.47%	Withdrew (Note: Despite losing the primary, Nixon had a slot in the general election as the nominee of the Working Families Party. On October 3, the Working Families Party offered their party's ballot line to the incumbent governor (and winner of the Democratic primary), Andrew Cuomo, and he accepted on October 5.)	N/A
Matt Brown	Rhode Island	Governor of Rhode Island	September 12, 2018	Lost	34.53%	Did not qualify	N/A
Christine Hallquist	Vermont	Governor of Vermont	August 14, 2018	Won	48.07%	Lost	40.25%

Lieutenant governor
Candidate	State	Office	Primary			General	
Candidate	State	Office	Date	Result	Votes	Result	Votes
Aaron Regunberg	Rhode Island	Lieutenant Governor of Rhode Island	September 12, 2018	Lost	48.93%	Did not qualify	N/A

U.S. Senate
Candidate	State	Office	Primary			General	
Candidate	State	Office	Date	Result	Votes	Result	Votes
Deedra Abboud	Arizona	U.S. Senator from Arizona	August 28, 2018	Lost	20.75%	Did not qualify	N/A
Alison Hartson	California	U.S. Senator from California	June 5, 2018	Lost	2.21%	Did not qualify	N/A
Kerri Evelyn Harris	Delaware	U.S. Senator from Delaware	September 6, 2018	Lost	35.41%	Did not qualify	N/A
Paula Jean Swearengin	West Virginia	U.S. Senator from West Virginia	May 8, 2018	Lost	30.14%	Did not qualify	N/A

U.S. House
Candidate	State	Office	Primary			General	
Candidate	State	Office	Date	Result	Votes	Result	Votes
Mary Matiella	Arizona	Arizona's 2nd congressional district	August 28, 2018	Lost	9.37%	Did not qualify	N/A
Raúl Grijalva (inc.)	Arizona	Arizona's 3rd congressional district	August 28, 2018	Won (Note: Ran unopposed)	100%	Won	63.39%
Brianna Westbrook	Arizona	Arizona's 8th congressional district	February 27, 2018 (Note: Special election to replace Trent Franks, who resigned on December 8, 2017)	Lost	39.72%	Did not qualify	N/A
Brianna Westbrook	Arizona	Arizona's 8th congressional district	August 28, 2018	Withdrew (Note: Running for the Arizona Senate in the 22nd district)	N/A	Did not qualify	N/A
Audrey Denney	California (Note: California and Washington use a nonpartisan blanket primary system, where all candidates run on one primary ballot, regardless of party affiliation, and the top two finishers advance to the general election.)	California's 1st congressional district	June 5, 2018	Advanced	17.92%	Lost	45.11%
Roza Calderon	California	California's 4th congressional district	June 5, 2018	Lost	6.43%	Did not qualify	N/A
Dotty Nygard	California	California's 10th congressional district	June 5, 2018	Withdrew	0.90%	Did not qualify	N/A
Ro Khanna (inc.)	California	California's 17th congressional district	June 5, 2018	Advanced	61.98%	Won	75.34%
Bryan Caforio	California	California's 25th congressional district	June 5, 2018	Lost	18.42%	Did not qualify	N/A
Laura Oatman	California	California's 48th congressional district	June 5, 2018	Withdrew	1.38%	Did not qualify	N/A
Doug Applegate	California	California's 49th congressional district	June 5, 2018	Lost	13.09%	Did not qualify	N/A
Ammar Campa-Najjar	California	California's 50th congressional district	June 5, 2018	Advanced	17.71%	Lost	48.28%
Saira Rao	Colorado	Colorado's 1st congressional district	June 26, 2018	Lost	31.75%	Did not qualify	N/A
Stephany Rose Spaulding	Colorado	Colorado's 5th congressional district	June 26, 2018	Won	100%	Lost	39.30%
Chardo Richardson	Florida	Florida's 7th congressional district	August 28, 2018	Lost	13.78%	Did not qualify	N/A
Sanjay Patel	Florida	Florida's 8th congressional district	August 28, 2018	Won	100%	Lost	39.50%
Pam Keith	Florida	Florida's 18th congressional district	August 28, 2018	Lost	39.71%	Did not qualify	N/A
Michael Hepburn	Florida	Florida's 27th congressional district	August 28, 2018	Lost	6.13%	Did not qualify	N/A
Lisa Ring	(Georgia (U.S. state)) Georgia	Georgia's 1st congressional district	May 22, 2018	Won	67.54%	Lost	42.26%
Kaniela Ing	Hawaii	Hawaii's 1st congressional district	August 11, 2018	Lost	6.35%	Did not qualify	N/A
Marie Newman	Illinois	Illinois's 3rd congressional district	March 20, 2018	Lost	48.87%	Did not qualify	N/A
Sameena Mustafa	Illinois	Illinois's 5th congressional district	August 11, 2018	Lost	24.12%	Did not qualify	N/A
Anthony Clark	Illinois	Illinois's 7th congressional district	March 20, 2018	Lost	26.13%	Did not qualify	N/A
David Gill	Illinois	Illinois's 13th congressional district	March 20, 2018	Lost	14.44%	Did not qualify	N/A
Dan Canon	Indiana	Indiana's 9th congressional district	May 8, 2018	Lost	30.69%	Did not qualify	N/A
Courtney Rowe	Iowa	Iowa's 1st congressional district	June 5, 2018	Lost	7.59%	Did not qualify	N/A
Pete D'Allesandro	Iowa	Iowa's 3rd congressional district	May 8, 2018	Lost	15.58%	Did not qualify	N/A
Brent Welder	Kansas	Kansas's 3rd congressional district	August 7, 2018	Lost	33.84%	Did not qualify	N/A
James Thompson	Kansas	Kansas's 4th congressional district	August 7, 2018	Won	65.23%	Lost	40.56%
Roger Manno	Maryland	Maryland's 6th congressional district	June 26, 2018	Lost	10.23%	Did not qualify	N/A
Juana Matias	Massachusetts	Massachusetts's 3rd congressional district	September 4, 2018	Lost	15.16%	Did not qualify	N/A
Ayanna Pressley	Massachusetts	Massachusetts's 7th congressional district	September 4, 2018	Won	58.60%	Won	98.25%
Matt Morgan	Michigan	Michigan's 1st congressional district	August 7, 2018	Won (Note: Due to a logistical error in his campaign filing, Morgan was unable to appear on the primary ballot. As he was the only Democrat to file to run in this district, he was able to win the primary with write-in votes.)	100%	Lost	43.68%
Rob Davidson	Michigan	Michigan's 2nd congressional district	August 7, 2018	Won	100%	Lost	42.96%
David Benac	Michigan	Michigan's 6th congressional district	August 7, 2018	Lost	21.27%	Did not qualify	N/A
Fayrouz Saad	Michigan	Michigan's 11th congressional district	August 7, 2018	Lost	19.41%	Did not qualify	N/A
Rashida Tlaib	Michigan	Michigan's 13th congressional district	August 7, 2018 (Note: Special election to replace John Conyers, who resigned on December 5, 2017)	Lost	35.84%	Did not qualify	N/A
Rashida Tlaib	Michigan	Michigan's 13th congressional district	August 7, 2018	Won	31.16%	Won	84.23%
Ilhan Omar	Minnesota	Minnesota's 5th congressional district	August 14, 2018	Won	48.21%	Won	77.96%
Cori Bush	Missouri	Missouri's 1st congressional district	August 7, 2018	Lost	36.92%	Did not qualify	N/A
Jamie Schoolcraft	Missouri	Missouri's 7th congressional district	August 7, 2018	Won	40.61%	Lost	30.08%
John Heenan	Montana	Montana's at-large congressional district	June 5, 2018	Lost	31.71%	Did not qualify	N/A
Kara H. Eastman	Nebraska	Nebraska's 2nd congressional district	May 15, 2018	Won	51.64%	Lost	49.00%
Amy Vilela	Nevada	Nevada's 4th congressional district	June 12, 2018	Lost	9.21%	Did not qualify	N/A
Tanzie Youngblood	New Jersey	New Jersey's 2nd congressional district	June 5, 2018	Lost	18.52%	Did not qualify	N/A
Peter Jacob	New Jersey	New Jersey's 7th congressional district	June 5, 2018	Lost	19.14%	Did not qualify	N/A
Antoinette Sedillo Lopez	New Mexico	New Mexico's 1st congressional district	June 5, 2018	Lost	20.60%	Did not qualify	N/A
Michael DeVito	(New York (state)) New York	New York's 11th congressional district	June 26, 2018	Lost	19.98%	Did not qualify	N/A
Alexandria Ocasio-Cortez	(New York (state)) New York	New York's 14th congressional district	June 26, 2018	Won	56.74%	Won	78.17%
Jeff Beals	(New York (state)) New York	New York's 19th congressional district	June 26, 2018	Lost	12.86%	Did not qualify	N/A
Patrick Nelson	(New York (state)) New York	New York's 21st congressional district	June 26, 2018	Lost	9.18%	Did not qualify	N/A
Ian Golden	(New York (state)) New York	New York's 23rd congressional district	June 26, 2018	Lost	13.36%	Did not qualify	N/A
Jenny Marshall	North Carolina	North Carolina's 5th congressional district	May 8, 2018	Lost	45.57%	Did not qualify	N/A
John Russell	Ohio	Ohio's 12th congressional district	May 8, 2018 (Note: Special election to replace Pat Tiberi, who resigned on January 15, 2018)	Lost	16.69%	Did not qualify	N/A
John Russell	Ohio	Ohio's 12th congressional district	May 8, 2018	Lost	16.26%	Did not qualify	N/A
Greg Edwards	Pennsylvania	Pennsylvania's 7th congressional district	May 15, 2018	Lost	25.57%	Did not qualify	N/A
Jess King	Pennsylvania	Pennsylvania's 11th congressional district	May 15, 2018	Won	100%	Lost	41.02%
J. Darnell Jones	Texas (Note: Texas uses a two-round primary system. If a candidate receives above 50% of the vote in the first round, they become the party's nominee; otherwise, the top two finishers advance to a second round.)	Texas's 2nd congressional district	March 6, 2018; First round	Lost	22.05%	Did not qualify	N/A
Lorie Burch	Texas	Texas's 3rd congressional district	March 6, 2018; First round	Advanced	49.60%	Runoff	N/A
Lorie Burch	Texas	Texas's 3rd congressional district	May 22, 2018; Runoff	Won	75.04%	Lost	44.23%
Laura Moser	Texas	Texas's 7th congressional district	March 6, 2018; First round	Advanced	24.34%	Runoff	N/A
Laura Moser	Texas	Texas's 7th congressional district	May 22, 2018; Runoff	Lost	32.91%	Did not qualify	N/A
Vanessa Adia	Texas	Texas's 12th congressional district	March 6, 2018	Won	100%	Lost	33.89%
Adrienne Bell	Texas	Texas's 14th congressional district	March 6, 2018	Won	79.80%	Lost	39.31%
Derrick Crowe	Texas	Texas's 21st congressional district	March 6, 2018; First round	Lost	23.06%	Did not qualify	N/A
Mary Wilson	Texas	Texas's 21st congressional district	March 6, 2018; First round	Advanced	30.92%	Runoff	N/A
Mary Wilson	Texas	Texas's 21st congressional district	May 22, 2018; Runoff	Lost	42.05%	Did not qualify	N/A
Rick Treviño	Texas	Texas's 23rd congressional district	March 6, 2018; First round	Advanced	17.48%	Runoff	N/A
Rick Treviño	Texas	Texas's 23rd congressional district	March 6, 2018; Runoff	Lost	32.09%	Did not qualify	N/A
Linsey Fagan	Texas	Texas's 26th congressional district	March 6, 2018	Won	52.69%	Lost	39.01%
Darlene McDonald	Utah	Utah's 4th congressional district	June 26, 2018	Eliminated (Note: In Utah, a state convention was held on April 21; of the 381 delegates present from the 4th district, McDonald won 25% of the votes and Salt Lake County mayor Ben McAdams won 72%. Since McAdams cleared the 60% threshold, he became the party's nominee, with no primary election taking place on June 26.)	N/A	Did not qualify	N/A
Dorothy Gasque	(Washington (state)) Washington	Washington's 3rd congressional district	August 7, 2018	Lost	4.87%	Did not qualify	N/A
Pramila Jayapal (inc.)	(Washington (state)) Washington	Washington's 7th congressional district	August 7, 2018	Advanced	82.66%	Won	83.56%
Sarah Smith	(Washington (state)) Washington	Washington's 9th congressional district	August 7, 2018	Advanced	26.86%	Lost	32.09%
Randy Bryce	Wisconsin	Wisconsin's 1st congressional district	August 14, 2018	Won	59.58%	Lost	42.26%

=== 2020 ===
Justice Democrats endorsed 17 candidates in the Democratic primaries for president, Senate and House. Twelve House candidates made it to the general election (7 incumbents, 5 newcomers). All the incumbents and three newcomers won.

U.S. President
Candidate	Office	Primary			General	
Candidate	Office	Name	Result	Votes	Result	Votes
Bernie Sanders	President of the United States	2020 Democratic Party presidential primaries	Withdrew	26.49%	Did not qualify	N/A

U.S. Senate
Candidate	State	Office	Primary			General	
Candidate	State	Office	Date	Result	Votes	Result	Votes
Betsy Sweet	Maine	U.S. Senator from Maine	July 14, 2020	Lost	22.94%	Did not qualify	N/A

U.S. House
Candidate	State	Office	Primary			General	
Candidate	State	Office	Date	Result	Votes	Result	Votes
Raúl Grijalva (inc.)	Arizona	Arizona's 3rd congressional district	August 4, 2020	Won	100%	Won	64.57%
Ro Khanna (inc.)	California	California's 17th congressional district	March 3, 2020	Advanced	68.64%	Won	71.34%
Georgette Gómez	California	California's 53rd congressional district	March 3, 2020	Advanced	19.96%	Lost	40.49%
Marie Newman	Illinois	Illinois's 3rd congressional district	March 17, 2020	Won	47.25%	Won	56.37%
Alex Morse	Massachusetts	Massachusetts's 1st congressional district	September 1, 2020	Lost	41.22%	Did not qualify	N/A
Ayanna Pressley (inc.)	Massachusetts	Massachusetts's 7th congressional district	September 1, 2020	Won	100%	Won	86.62%
Rashida Tlaib (inc.)	Michigan	Michigan's 13th congressional district	August 4, 2020	Won	66.27%	Won	78.07%
Ilhan Omar (inc.)	Minnesota	Minnesota's 5th congressional district	August 11, 2020	Won	57.18%	Won	64.26%
Cori Bush	Missouri	Missouri's 1st congressional district	August 4, 2020	Won	48.52%	Won	78.78%
Kara Eastman	Nebraska	Nebraska's 2nd congressional district	May 12, 2020	Won	62.15%	Lost	46.20%
Alexandria Ocasio-Cortez (inc.)	(New York (state)) New York	New York's 14th congressional district	June 23, 2020	Won	74.59%	Won	71.63%
Jamaal Bowman	(New York (state)) New York	New York's 16th congressional district	June 23, 2020	Won	55.44%	Won	84.17%
Morgan Harper	Ohio	Ohio's 3rd congressional district	April 28, 2020	Lost	31.87%	Did not qualify	N/A
Jessica Cisneros	Texas	Texas's 28th congressional district	March 3, 2020	Lost	48.20%	Did not qualify	N/A
Pramila Jayapal (inc.)	(Washington (state)) Washington	Washington's 7th congressional district	August 4, 2020	Advanced	79.97%	Won	82.98%

=== 2021 ===
U.S. House
Candidate	State	Office	Primary			General	
Candidate	State	Office	Date	Result	Votes	Result	Votes
Nina Turner	Ohio	Ohio's 11th congressional district	August 3, 2021 (Note: Special election to replace Marcia Fudge, who resigned on March 10, 2021)	Lost	44.55%	Did not qualify	N/A

=== 2022 ===
Justice Democrats endorsed 10 incumbents and 6 newcomers. All but one incumbent won, as did two newcomers.

U.S. House
Candidate	State	Office	Primary			General	
Candidate	State	Office	Date	Result	Votes	Result	Votes
Raúl Grijalva (inc.)	Arizona	Arizona's 7th congressional district (Note: Grijalva ran in the new 7th district, which was renumbered from the 3rd district in redistricting.)	August 2, 2022	Won	100%	Won	64.54%
Ro Khanna (inc.)	California	California's 17th congressional district	June 7, 2022	Advanced	65.95%	Won	70.92%
Marie Newman (inc.)	Illinois	Illinois's 6th congressional district (Note: Newman ran in the new 6th district after moving from the 4th district and previously representing the 3rd district prior to redistricting.)	June 28, 2022	Lost	29.23%	Did not qualify	N/A
Kina Collins	Illinois	Illinois's 7th congressional district	June 28, 2022	Lost	45.72%	Did not qualify	N/A
Ayanna Pressley (inc.)	Massachusetts	Massachusetts's 7th congressional district	September 6, 2022	Won	100%	Won	84.57%
Rashida Tlaib (inc.)	Michigan	Michigan's 12th congressional district (Note: Talib is running in the new 12th district after moving from the 13th district due to redistricting.)	August 2, 2022	Won	63.84%	Won	70.84%
Ilhan Omar (inc.)	Minnesota	Minnesota's 5th congressional district	August 9, 2022	Won	50.34%	Won	74.33%
Cori Bush (inc.)	Missouri	Missouri's 1st congressional district	August 2, 2022	Won	69.48%	Won	72.86%
Rana Abdelhamid	(New York (state)) New York	New York's 12th congressional district	August 23, 2022	Withdrew	N/A	Did not qualify	N/A
Alexandria Ocasio-Cortez (inc.)	(New York (state)) New York	New York's 14th congressional district	August 23, 2022	Won	100%	Won	70.59%
Jamaal Bowman (inc.)	(New York (state)) New York	New York's 16th congressional district	August 23, 2022	Won	54.16%	Won	64.23%
Summer Lee	Pennsylvania	Pennsylvania's 12th congressional district (Note: Lee ran in the new 12th district, which was renumbered from the 18th district in redistricting.)	May 17, 2022	Won	41.89%	Won	55.19%
Odessa Kelly	Tennessee	Tennessee's 7th congressional district (Note: Kelly ran in the new 7th district after moving from the 5th district due to redistricting.)	August 4, 2022	Won	100%	Lost	38.14%
Jessica Cisneros	Texas	Texas's 28th congressional district	March 1, 2022; First round	Advanced	46.62%	Runoff	N/A
Jessica Cisneros	Texas	Texas's 28th congressional district	May 24, 2022; Runoff	Lost	49.69%	Did not qualify	N/A
Greg Casar	Texas	Texas's 35th congressional district	March 1, 2022	Won	61.11%	Won	72.57%
Pramila Jayapal (inc.)	(Washington (state)) Washington	Washington's 7th congressional district	August 2, 2022	Advanced	84.86%	Won	85.38%

=== 2024 ===
Justice Democrats endorsed 12 incumbents, and all but two won re-election.

U.S. House
Candidate	State	Office	Primary			General	
Candidate	State	Office	Date	Result	Votes	Result	Votes
Raúl Grijalva (inc.)	Arizona	Arizona's 7th congressional district	August 6, 2024	Won	100%	Won	63.44%
Ro Khanna (inc.)	California	California's 17th congressional district	March 5, 2024	Advanced	62.90%	Won	67.66%
Delia Ramirez (inc.)	Illinois	Illinois's 3rd congressional district	March 19, 2024	Won	100%	Won	67.26%
Ayanna Pressley (inc.)	Massachusetts	Massachusetts's 7th congressional district	September 3, 2024	Won	100%	Won	97.11%
Rashida Tlaib (inc.)	Michigan	Michigan's 12th congressional district	August 6, 2024	Won	100%	Won	69.69%
Ilhan Omar (inc.)	Minnesota	Minnesota's 5th congressional district	August 13, 2024	Won	56.22%	Won	74.36%
Cori Bush (inc.)	Missouri	Missouri's 1st congressional district	August 6, 2024	Lost	45.64%	Did not qualify	N/A
Alexandria Ocasio-Cortez (inc.)	(New York (state)) New York	New York's 14th congressional district	June 25, 2024	Won	82.13%	Won	69.19%
Jamaal Bowman (inc.)	(New York (state)) New York	New York's 16th congressional district	June 25, 2024	Lost	41.41%	Did not qualify	N/A
Summer Lee (inc.)	Pennsylvania	Pennsylvania's 12th congressional district	April 23, 2024	Won	60.65%	Won	56.41%
Greg Casar (inc.)	Texas	Texas's 35th congressional district	March 5, 2024	Won	100%	Won	67.35%
Pramila Jayapal (inc.)	(Washington (state)) Washington	Washington's 7th congressional district	August 6, 2024	Advanced	79.86%	Won	83.91%

=== 2026 ===
Justice Democrats endorsed 9 incumbents, 1 former representative, and 14 newcomers.

U.S. House
Candidate	State	Office	Primary			General	
Candidate	State	Office	Date	Result	Votes	Result	Votes
Mai Vang	California	California's 7th congressional district	June 2, 2026	Advanced	30.85%	Lost	Pending
Saikat Chakrabarti	California	California's 11th congressional district	June 2, 2026	Lost	17.63%	Did not qualify	N/A
Ro Khanna (inc.)	California	California's 17th congressional district	June 2, 2026	Advanced	62.38%	Won	Pending
Angela Gonzales-Torres	California	California's 34th congressional district	June 2, 2026	Advanced	30.70%	Won	Pending
Melat Kiros	Colorado	Colorado's 1st congressional district	June 30, 2026	Won	53.11%	Won	Pending
Delia Ramirez (inc.)	Illinois	Illinois's 3rd congressional district	March 17, 2026	Won	100%	Won	Pending
Junaid Ahmed	Illinois	Illinois's 8th congressional district	March 17, 2026	Lost	26.88%	Did not qualify	N/A
Kat Abughazaleh	Illinois	Illinois's 9th congressional district	March 17, 2026	Lost	26.33%	Did not qualify	N/A
Ayanna Pressley (inc.)	Massachusetts	Massachusetts's 7th congressional district	September 1, 2026	Won	100%	Won	Pending
Rashida Tlaib (inc.)	Michigan	Michigan's 12th congressional district	August 4, 2026	Won	73.91%	Won	Pending
Donavan McKinney	Michigan	Michigan's 13th congressional district	August 4, 2026	Won	51.70%	Won	Pending
Ilhan Omar (inc.)	Minnesota	Minnesota's 5th congressional district	August 11, 2026	Won	80.71%	Won	Pending
Cori Bush	Missouri	Missouri's 1st congressional district	August 4, 2026	Lost	36.86%	Did not qualify	N/A
Adam Hamawy	New Jersey	New Jersey's 12th congressional district	June 2, 2026	Won	28.11%	Won	Pending
Claire Valdez	(New York (state)) New York	New York's 7th congressional district	June 23, 2026	Won	56.06%	Won	Pending
Darializa Avila Chevalier	(New York (state)) New York	New York's 13th congressional district	June 23, 2026	Won	49.41%	Won	Pending
Alexandria Ocasio-Cortez (inc.)	(New York (state)) New York	New York's 14th congressional district	June 23, 2026	Won	86.93%	Won	Pending
Nida Allam	North Carolina	North Carolina's 4th congressional district	March 3, 2026	Lost	48.23%	Did not qualify	N/A
Chris Rabb	Pennsylvania	Pennsylvania's 3rd congressional district	May 19, 2026	Won	44.63%	Won	Pending
Summer Lee (inc.)	Pennsylvania	Pennsylvania's 12th congressional district	May 19, 2026	Won	81.20%	Won	Pending
Justin Pearson	Tennessee	Tennessee's 9th congressional district	August 6, 2026	Won	65.80%	Lost	Pending
Frederick Haynes III	Texas	Texas's 30th congressional district	March 3, 2026	Won	72.62%	Won	Pending
Greg Casar (inc.)	Texas	Texas's 37th congressional district (Note: Casar ran in the new 37th district, which was renumbered from the 35th district in redistricting.)	March 3, 2026	Won	80.75%	Won	Pending
Pramila Jayapal (inc.)	(Washington (state)) Washington	Washington's 7th congressional district	August 4, 2026	Advanced	84.36%	Won	Pending

== See also ==
- Brand New Congress
- Wolf PAC
- Sunrise Movement
