= Waleed Shahid =

American activist (born 1990 or 1991)

- Born: 1990 or 1991 (age 35–36); Arlington County, Virginia, U.S.
- Education: Haverford College
- Political party: Democratic
- Other political affiliations: Working Families
- Movement: Progressive, Environmental justice

Waleed Shahid (born 1990 or 1991) is a political activist and strategist best known as the communications director and spokesperson for Justice Democrats, where he held leadership roles on campaigns to elect progressive candidates such as Cori Bush, Alexandria Ocasio-Cortez, Jamaal Bowman, and others. He is also a co-writer of the Green New Deal, a proposed economic stimulus program. He is currently the deputy communications director for economic justice in the mayoralty of Zohran Mamdani.

== Early life ==
Waleed Shahid grew up in Arlington County, Virginia, to immigrant Punjabi Muslim parents from Lahore, Pakistan. His father is a parking garage manager and his mother is a retired special education teaching assistant. After 9/11, his parents advised him to never talk about politics because of concern for his safety. Shahid credits his teenage rebellion with going in the opposite direction. Shahid said his first political action was attending a protest against the Border Protection, Anti-terrorism and Illegal Immigration Control Act of 2005, which motivated him to organize a walk-out at his school.

Shahid graduated from Haverford College in 2013.

Dissent has described Shahid as "a pragmatic thinker who sees the limits of the U.S. electoral system while maintaining that progressive political transformation requires working within it".

== Early career ==
After graduating from Haverford, Shahid began working for a nonprofit in Philadelphia providing social and legal services to immigrants and refugees. His role was to interview undocumented immigrants seeking a legal pathway to receiving status, and Shahid was disillusioned that most of them had no options. He was trained to tell them, “I’m sorry, there’s nothing we can do for you, but watch CNN because President Obama might pass something this year.”

Shahid has cited Tea Party challenger David Brat's surprise victory over Eric Cantor and the 15-M movement that resulted in the creation of Podemos as a blueprint for changing politics in the United States. Around the same time, Shahid attended community organizing training at Movement Mastery where he met organizers against the Keystone XL pipeline, as well as those in support of the DREAM Act, Black Lives Matter, and Occupy Wall Street.

In 2015, Shahid became a contributor to In These Times and he also became a movement-building trainer at Movement Mastery. In the same year he also co-founded AllOfUs with Max Berger, Yong Jung Cho, and nine other activists that was "somewhere between a book club and a discussion group," but formulated the theory for a Tea Party of the left. In 2016 he began contributing to The Nation, where he would later join the editorial board.

As the 2016 presidential campaign of Bernie Sanders started, Shahid was working as the political director of the Pennsylvania Working Families Party. He joined the Sanders field team and became a delegate for him at the Democratic National Convention. After Sanders was defeated, he and other activists wanted a way to continue the momentum from the campaign and see if they could form a "Tea Party of the left" to cause a left-oriented political realignment within the Democratic party.

In November 2017 AllOfUs and Justice Democrats, founded in January of that year, announced a merger, after Shahid met Alexandra Rojas, one of the co-founders, at a political action summit. Shahid and Berger joined the organization.

== Political career ==
=== Justice Democrats ===
Shahid was communications director for Justice Democrats, an organization formed in January 2017 to elect progressive Democrats including Alexandria Ocasio-Cortez, Jamaal Bowman, Cori Bush, Summer Lee, and others, who Shahid helped to recruit. Shahid also acted as spokesperson for Justice Democrats. During the upset victory of Ocasio-Cortez, Shahid was a senior advisor, and during the 2018 New York gubernatorial election he was the policy director for Cynthia Nixon.

In 2018, Shahid helped draft the Green New Deal along with Saikat Chakrabarti, Rhiana Gunn-Wright, Sean McElwee, and members of the Sunrise Movement.

Shahid stayed with the organization for six years, until he left to found the Uncommitted movement during the 2024 United States presidential election.

=== Uncommitted movement ===
In 2023, Shahid co-founded the Uncommitted movement, a protest campaign with the goal of pressuring the United States government to achieve a ceasefire in the Gaza war. He acted as the group's senior advisor.

In late 2024, Shahid became a fellow at the Institute of Politics and Public Service at Georgetown University where he taught an 8-week course titled "Protest to Politics, Grassroots to Governance."

=== The Bloc ===
In 2025, Shahid founded The Bloc, an organization to train progressive communications staff and provide strategic support. He acted as the organization's executive director until the organization folded in 2026 when Shahid took a position in the administration of New York City mayor Zohran Mamdani.

=== Zohran Mamdani administration ===
After the election of Zohran Mamdani as Mayor of New York City, Shahid served on the transition team on the Community Organizing committee. In 2026, Shahid joined the administration as deputy communications director of economic justice.

"New York City is a city of constant new arrivals and the story of the Irish and Italians in the cities, Jewish tenement workers, people from the Caribbean, Black families from the south. This city is constantly being renewed and it’s always a fight and it is never easy."

— Waleed Shahid, in 2026

== Personal life ==
Shahid lives in Brooklyn with his wife, Emily Mayer, co-founder of IfNotNow. The two met while they attended Haverford College. Their wedding was officiated by New York City Comptroller Brad Lander, a friend of the couple who became ordained for the occasion. Notable guests included Jamaal Bowman and Cynthia Nixon.

== See also ==
- Justice Democrats
- Progressivism in the United States
- Mayoralty of Zohran Mamdani
