= AllOfUs =

American progressive political organization

AllOfUs was an American progressive political action committee founded in September 2016 by Yong Jung Cho, Max Berger, Waleed Shahid and former members of Bernie Sanders' 2016 presidential campaign. The organization formed with the goal of transforming the Democratic Party. On November 1, 2017, AllOfUs was folded into Justice Democrats.

AllOfUs launched WeWillReplaceYou, a political action committee, in order to pressure Democrats into not cooperating with the Trump administration.
