= Jon Soltz =

American military officer and political advocate

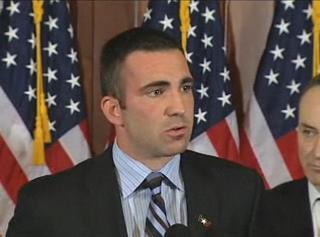
- Jon Soltz in a January 2007 press conference with U.S. Senate Democrats opposing the Iraq War troop surge of 2007
- Born: Jon Soltz; Gaithersburg, Maryland
- Military career
- Allegiance: United States
- Branch: United States Army
- Service years: 1999–2011
- Rank: Colonel
- Unit: 1st Armored Division
- Conflicts: Kosovo War; Iraq War

Jon Soltz served as a United States Army officer in the Iraq War and is chairman and co-founder of the veterans advocacy group VoteVets.org. Soltz served in both the Kosovo campaign in 2000 and later in Operation Iraqi Freedom in 2003. Based on his service, Soltz became an outspoken critic of the execution of Operation Iraqi Freedom. Soltz deployed in 2011 as part of Operation New Dawn in Iraq.

== Military service and background ==
Soltz was commissioned in 1999 from the University of Pittsburgh Army ROTC and attended the Armor Officer Basic Course at Fort Knox, Kentucky. Following his graduation he was stationed in Germany from 1999–2003. Between June and December 2000, he served as a tank platoon leader in the Kosovo War. Between May and September 2003, he served as a captain during Operation Iraqi Freedom, where he worked deployed logistics convoys with the 1st Armored Division.

Leaving active duty in 2004 and transferring to the U.S. Army Reserve, in 2005 he trained soldiers for combat at Fort Dix, New Jersey. He took a leave of absence from VoteVets.org in January 2011, to deploy as part of Operation New Dawn. Until he returned to the group in 2011, Ashwin Madia, an Iraq War veteran former U.S. Marine Corps Judge Advocate officer, and onetime candidate for U.S. Congress, assumed the role of interim chairman. On December 12, 2011, Soltz returned as chairman of VoteVets.org after completing his deployment to Iraq. On July 23, 2021, Soltz graduated from the US Army War College, earning his JPME 1 certification.

== Veterans' advocacy ==
In 2006, Soltz co-founded VoteVets.org, which originally was a PAC that endorsed a slate of veterans running for office.

Since that time, VoteVets has grown into a group that claims 700,000 supporters, including veterans, military families, and civilians who support them, and is made up of both a PAC and 501c(4), VoteVets Action Fund. The PAC has helped elect a number of veterans in every cycle at the Federal, state, and local levels.

Soltz volunteered for the John Kerry presidential campaign in 2004. Regarding his personal political views, Soltz told The Washington Post in 2007 that "I'm a conservative" and that he opposed the Iraq War troop surge of 2007 because "I don't think 20,000 more troops is Democratic, I don't think 20,000 troops is Republican. I think it's stupid."

He has been a frequent contributor to numerous shows, including All In with Chris Hayes, The Last Word with Lawrence O’Donnell, Morning Joe, AM Joy, Countdown with Keith Olbermann and The Dylan Ratigan Show on MSNBC. He has been interviewed by the Associated Press, Washington Post, New York Times, Los Angeles Times, Time magazine and Newsweek. He has appeared on NewsHour with Jim Lehrer, CNN, MSNBC, Fox News Channel, ABC News, Nightline, Air America Radio, The Ed Schultz Show, and The Bill Press Show.

== See also ==
- General John Batiste
- VoteVets.org
- Vet Voice Foundation
- A Responsible Plan to End the War in Iraq
- Global Zero (campaign)
