= Keith Wofford =

American attorney

Personal details
- Born: January 25, 1969 (age 57) Buffalo, New York, U.S.
- Party: Republican
- Spouse: Marla Wofford
- Children: 2
- Education: Harvard University (BA, JD)

Keith H. Wofford (born January 25, 1969) is an American attorney. He was a candidate in the 2018 New York Attorney General Election, running on the Republican and Conservative ballot lines. Wofford was the first African-American Republican nominee for the office of attorney general. He earned 35.2% of the vote, losing to then-New York City Public Advocate Letitia James, who received 62.4% of the vote.

== Early life and education ==
Wofford grew up in the Buffalo, New York area as one of two sons. His father, John, worked at a Chevrolet plant, and his mother, Ruby, worked two retail jobs. At 17, he attended Harvard University on a scholarship and graduated from Harvard Law School.

== Career ==
For many years, Wofford served as a corporate bankruptcy lawyer for the firm Ropes & Gray.

On May 22, 2018, Wofford announced that he would be seeking the Republican nomination for Attorney General of New York in 2018. He stated that addressing political corruption in state government was his top priority. Wofford was the first African-American Republican nominee for attorney general, and was considered an underdog. He campaigned on his outsider status. Leading up to the election, Letitia James was heavily favored to win. Wofford was endorsed by U.S. Representative Pete King, The Buffalo News, The Citizen, The Daily Gazette, Jewish Voice, New York Post, The Post Star, and Watertown Daily Times.

Wofford received 2,108,600 votes, finishing behind James, who earned 3,739,239 votes, and ahead of candidates from the Green, Libertarian, and Reform parties.

On October 13, 2020, Wofford was elected to the board of trustees for the New-York Historical Society.

In late 2020, Wofford was hired by the law firm White & Case and is based in its Miami, Florida office.

== Personal life ==
Keith and his wife, Marla, have two children.

== Electoral history ==
New York Attorney General election, 2018
Party	Candidate	Votes	%	±%
Democratic	Letitia James	3,497,213	58.38%	+12.89%
Working Families	Letitia James	152,350	2.54%	−1.79%
Independence	Letitia James	89,676	1.50%	−1.33%
Total	Letitia James	3,739,239	62.42%	+9.77%
Republican	Keith Wofford	1,851,510	30.91%	−1.68%
Conservative	Keith Wofford	257,090	4.29%	−2.31%
Total	Keith Wofford	2,108,600	35.20%	−4.24%
Green	Michael Sussman	72,512	1.21%	−0.85%
Libertarian	Christopher Garvey	43,767	0.73%	+0.10%
Reform	Nancy Sliwa	26,441	0.44%	N/A
Total votes		5,990,559	100.0%	N/A
Democratic hold				

Party political offices
Preceded by John P. Cahill	Republican nominee for Attorney General of New York; 2018	Succeeded by Michael Henry
