= Zack Exley =

American political consultant (born 1969)

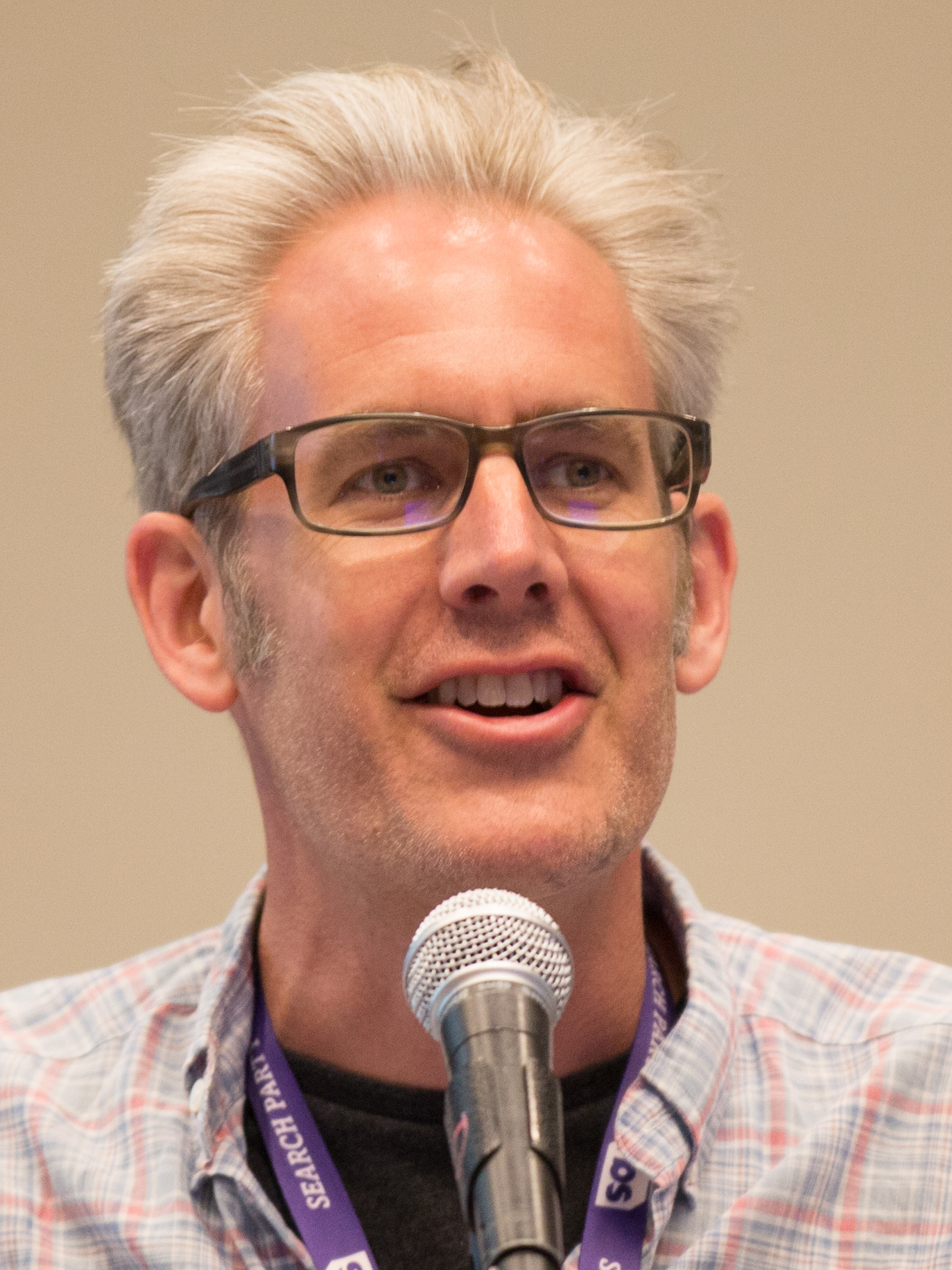
- Born: December 5, 1969 (age 56)
- Education: University of Massachusetts, Amherst (BA)
- Political party: Democratic
- Other political affiliations: Justice Democrats; Brand New Congress; New Organizing Institute
- Website: zackexley.com

Zack Exley (born December 5, 1969) is an American political and technology consultant.

== Early life and education ==
Exley was raised in West Hartford, Connecticut. He studied abroad at Shanxi Normal University before earning his B.A. in social thought and political economy from the University of Massachusetts Amherst in 1993. He also attended the John F. Kennedy School of Government.

== Career ==
=== 2000s ===
==== 2000 presidential election ====
Exley created the political parody website, GWBush.com, as well as cnndn.com, a site that parodied financial reporting. Both sites attracted legal action by Bush's 2000 election campaign and CNN, respectively. CNN successfully closed cnndn.com, but legal action from the Bush campaign led to increased publicity for Exley's site and set legal precedent that has allowed political websites to operate without Federal Election Commission regulation. In response to GWBush.com, then-candidate George W. Bush called Exley a "garbage man" and expressed his opinion that the website should be shut down, arguing "There ought to be limits to freedom."

Around the 2000 election controversy, Exley enabled citizens to self-organize over 100 protests around the United States through a website.

==== 2004 presidential election ====
Exley then served as Organizing Director at MoveOn.org during the group's campaign to prevent the Iraq War, and during its controversial involvement with the Howard Dean 2004 presidential campaign. He was criticized for "rigging" the 2003 "MoveOn Primary" in favor of Dean, a charge the group rejected.

In 2004, he was hired from MoveOn to be the Director of Online Communications and Organizing of the John Kerry 2004 presidential campaign, and directed internet operations for the UK Labour Party's re-election campaign in 2005.

In 2005, he co-founded the New Organizing Institute, a progressive political technology training organization, where he served as president.

In 2007, Exley started Revolution in Jesusland, a blog that sought to create dialog between the secular left and groups within Evangelical Christianity that promote economic and social justice as a matter of faith. The blog has been inactive since 2010.

In 2008, Exley joined ThoughtWorks, a global IT consultancy, helping to "pair developers with non-profits in need".

=== 2010s ===
Exley served as the Chief Revenue Officer (formerly Chief Community Officer) at the Wikimedia Foundation from 2010 to 2013. He continued to provide contracted fundraising consultation until 2017.

Politico reported in August 2015 that Exley had joined the 2016 Bernie Sanders presidential campaign as a senior advisor responsible for digital communications. Following Sanders loss in the 2016 Democratic Party presidential primaries, several staffers, including Exley, founded Brand New Congress.

After the 2016 United States presidential election, Exley, Saikat Chakrabarti, a former fellow Sanders campaign executive, Kyle Kulinski of Secular Talk and Cenk Uygur of The Young Turks created Justice Democrats to reform the Democratic Party and challenge President Donald Trump. Exley co-founded Middle Seat, a Washington, D.C.-based digital organizing firm, which worked extensively with Justice Democrats.

=== 2020s ===
As of 2025, Exley was managing Chakrabarti's campaign to challenge Nancy Pelosi in the Democratic primary for California's 11th congressional district.
