= New Organizing Institute =

American political organization

- Motto: For organizers, by organizers
- Founders: Judith Freeman, Zack Exley
- Established: 2005
- Focus: Campaign tactics
- Location: Washington, D.C.
- Dissolved: 2015

The New Organizing Institute (NOI) was a progressive grassroots organization located in Washington, D.C., until it dissolved in 2015. Founded in 2005 by Judith Freeman and Zack Exley, the non-profit organization was responsible for training many of the Democratic Party's digital organizers. NOI provided data, digital, and other trainings to progressive campaigners and organizers. The Washington Post called NOI "the left's think tank for campaign know-how."

== History ==
Rosalyn Lemieux served as the first executive director from 2006 through 2007. Judith Freeman served as the executive director from 2007 to 2013, with leave in 2008 to serve on Barack Obama's presidential campaign. Laura Packard served as interim executive director at that time. In 2013, Former Obama for America data director Ethan Roeder was tapped as executive director.

The first bootcamp for progressive digital organizers was held in the winter of 2006, and nine classes of bootcamps were held in total through the years. NOI was the sponsor RootsCamp, an annual political unconference. In 2011, NOI partnered with MoveOn.org, USAction, People for the American Way, and Rebuild the Dream in a drive to recruit, train and support 2,012 progressive candidates in 2012 for state, local and national office. Donors included the Open Society Foundations, the Bauman Foundation, the Ford Foundation, and the Atlantic Philanthropies.

In February 2015, eight senior staffers and a number of other paid employees were fired by NOI in response to a request that the board dismiss Executive Director Ethan Roeder due to frustrations over his lack of fundraising and management style. Another seven staffers were then let go. Several former staffers asked the National Labor Relations Board to investigate the matter. On October 9, 2015, NOI announced that it was closing shop and handing over certain aspects of its work to Wellstone Action.
