= VoteVets =

American non-profit organization

- Established: 2006; 20 years ago
- Founders: Jeremy Broussard; Jon Soltz
- Type: Non-profit 501(c)(4); Political action committee
- Tax ID no.: 51-0596352 a 501(c)(4); C00418897 a Hybrid PAC
- Purpose: National security; Veterans' care
- Members: Does not have members, only donors. Claims c. 700,000 donors. (2020)
- Website: www.votevets.org

VoteVets is a political action committee (PAC) and 501(c)(4) nonprofit organization in the United States.

The organization prioritizes American defense, national security, and veterans advocacy. It was co-founded in 2006 by Jon Soltz and Jeremy Broussard and initially composed of United States Iraq and Afghanistan war veterans. In 2020, the mission of the PAC is to elect veterans to public office that "fully support our men and women in uniform." According to the group's website, in 2020, the group is backed by over 700,000 supporters, including veterans, military families and civilians.

VoteVets endorses Democrats for elected office. In media, they have been described as "closely aligned with Congressional Democrats", and "liberal" by the Center for Public Integrity, The New York Times and The Washington Post.

== By election ==
=== 2006 ===
During the United States 2006 election cycle, VoteVets PAC spent between $1.2 and $2 million (sources differ) trying to influence the outcomes of various congressional races. Senators targeted by VoteVets's campaign for their support of the Iraq War included Republicans George Allen, Rick Santorum, Conrad Burns, and Jim Talent. For each congressional campaign, they released a television advertisement criticizing the (now former) senators for their vote against body armor for US troops in 2003. VoteVets claim was based, in part, on the Republican senators' vote against an amendment offered by Democratic Louisiana Senator Mary Landrieu, in 2003, to boost National Guard and Reserves equipment funding by $1 billion. The group FactCheck.org (a self-described non-partisan project of the Annenberg Center at the University of Pennsylvania) stated that the ad was misleading because the 2003 Senate budget amendment (on which the criticism was based) made no specific reference to "body armor". However, the progressive Media Matters for America repeatedly pointed out what it said were "misleading" statements about the ads by FactCheck.org.

The group also ran ads targeting now-former Republican Representatives Melissa Hart, Gil Gutknecht, John Sweeney, John Doolittle, and Jon Porter. In that ad, an Iraq veteran, Tomas Young, who was paralyzed in Iraq, criticized the members of Congress for voting against increases in funding for veterans' health care, while, in some cases, voting themselves a pay raise.

The group also made a number of contributions to candidates, but only to those candidates who served during the wars in Iraq or Afghanistan. In 2006, out of all the Iraq or Afghanistan veterans running for Congress, VoteVets supported all but one of them (Van Taylor, Republican in Texas). The endorsed candidates were: Patrick Murphy (D-PA), Joe Sestak (D-PA), Tammy Duckworth (D-IL), Sam Schultz (R-IN), Andrew Duck (D-MD), and David Harris (D-TX). The group also supported Tim Walz (D-MN), and Chris Carney (D-PA). Murphy, Sestak, Walz, and Carney were all elected to Congress, and VoteVets's site indicated they were endorsed for their 2008 reelection.

=== 2008 ===
In May 2007, retired Major General John Batiste appeared in a political video for VoteVets. As part of a $500,000 campaign, variations of the video were shown in a number of congressional districts and also included two other retired generals: Paul D. Eaton and Wesley K. Clark. Batiste had been an Iraq War news consultant for CBS News. However, following his appearance in the video, CBS stated that appearing in the advertisement violated their contract, and Batiste was asked to "vacate his position."

VoteVets Political Action Committee continued to endorse Iraq and Afghanistan veterans for Congress in the 2008 elections. These included Rick Noriega (D-TX) who ran for Senate in Texas against incumbent John Cornyn, and many who ran for the House, including John Boccieri (D-OH), Michael D. Lumpkin (D-CA), Ashwin Madia (D-MN), Jill Morgenthaler (D-IL), Steve Sarvi (D-MN), and Jonathan Powers (D-NY). The group endorsed candidates who are not Iraq or Afghanistan combat veterans, including Eric Massa (D-NY), and Gary Peters (D-MI), who had both served within the past decade. The group also held an on-line runoff, in which members were able to vote for one older veteran to endorse. That runoff was won by Charlie Brown (D-CA), who the group endorsed.

The group also endorsed the candidates who it endorsed in 2006 and reached Congress, Democratic Representatives Patrick Murphy, Joe Sestak, Tim Walz, and Chris Carney. Overall, VoteVets PAC contributed nearly $500,000 to candidates and other PACs during the 2008 election cycle.

While VoteVets did not officially endorse a candidate for president in 2008, the group did publicly support Barack Obama's plan for Iraq and actively opposed John McCain's campaign for President, despite McCain being an honored war veteran.

=== 2010 ===
In 2010, VoteVets endorsed the following candidates for House in the general election:

- Bryan Lentz (PA-7)
- Tommy Sowers (MO-8)
- Manan Trivedi (PA-6)
- then-Congressman John Boccieri (OH-16)
- then-Congressman Chris Carney (PA-10)
- then-Congressman Walt Minnick (ID-1)
- then-Congressman Patrick Murphy (PA-8)
- then-Congressman, now Senator Gary Peters (MI-9)
- then-Congressman Joe Sestak (PA-7)
- then-Congressman, now Governor Tim Walz (MN-1)

=== 2012 ===
In 2012, VoteVets endorsed the following candidates for House and Senate in the general election:

- Bob Kerrey (NE-Senate)
- Richard Carmona (AZ-Senate)
- Tammy Duckworth (IL-8)
- Bill Enyart (IL-12)
- Tulsi Gabbard (HI-2)
- John Douglass (VA-5)
- Brendan Mullen (IN-2)
- then-Congressman, now Senator Gary Peters (MI-14)
- Manan Trivedi (PA-6)
- then-Congressman, now Governor Tim Walz (MN-1)

=== 2014 ===
In 2014, VoteVets endorsed the following candidates for House and Senate in the general election:

- then-Congressman, now Senator Gary Peters (MI-Senate)
- Senator Jack Reed (RI-Senate)
- then-Congresswoman, now Senator Tammy Duckworth (IL-8)
- then-Congressman Bill Enyart (IL-12)
- Congresswoman Tulsi Gabbard (HI-2)
- Ruben Gallego (AZ-7)
- Ted Lieu (CA-33)
- Seth Moulton (MA-6)
- Kevin Strouse (PA-8)
- Wesley Reed (TX-27)
- Jerry Cannon (MI-1)
- then-Congressman, now Governor Tim Walz (MN-1)
- Jim Mowrer (IA-4)
- Mark Takai (HI-1)

=== 2016 ===
In 2016, VoteVets endorsed the following candidates for House and Senate in the general election:

- then-Congresswoman Tammy Duckworth (IL-Senate)
- then-Secretary of State Jason Kander (MO-Senate)
- Congresswoman Tulsi Gabbard (HI-2)
- then-Congressman, now Governor Tim Walz (MN-1)
- Congressman Ruben Gallego (AZ-7)
- Congressman Ted Lieu (CA-33)
- Congressman Seth Moulton (MA-6)
- Anthony Brown (MD-4)
- Jim Mowrer (IA-3)
- Doug Applegate (CA-49)
- Mike Derrick (NY-21)
- John Plumb (NY-23)
- Salud Carbajal (CA-24)
- DuWayne Gregory (NY-2)
- Jimmy Panetta (CA-20)

Additionally, the group endorsed a number of candidates for Governor:

- Governor John Bel Edwards (LA)
- then-Lt. Governor Ralph Northam (VA)
- Steve Hobbs (WA)

=== 2018 ===
In 2018, VoteVets endorsed the following candidates for House and Senate in the general election:

- then-Senator Bill Nelson (FL-Sen)
- Senator Tom Carper (DE-Sen)
- Congressman Ruben Gallego (AZ-7)
- Congressman Ted Lieu (CA-33)
- Congressman Seth Moulton (MA-6)
- Congressman Anthony Brown (MD-4)
- Congressman Salud Carbajal (CA-24)
- Congressman Jimmy Panetta (CA-20)
- Randy Bryce (WI-1)
- Gil Cisneros (CA-39)
- Jesse Colvin (MD-1)
- Jason Crow (CO-6)
- Den Feehan (MN-1)
- Jared Golden (ME-2)
- Ken Harbaugh (OH-7)
- MJ Hegar (TX-31)
- Chrissy Houlahan (PA-6)
- Brendan Kelly (IL-12)
- Joseph Kopser (TX-21)
- Elaine Luria (VA-2)
- Dan McCready (NC-9)
- Amy McGrath (KY-6)
- Richard Ojeda (WV-3)
- Gina Ortiz-Jones (TX-23)
- Max Rose (NY-11)
- Mikie Sherrill (NJ-11)
- George Scott (PA-10)
- Josh Welle (NJ-4)

The group also endorsed Conor Lamb in a special election in PA-18, and again in the general election, in November 2018.

Additionally, the group endorsed a number of candidates for Governor:

- then-Congressman Tim Walz (MN)
- David Garcia (AZ)
- James E. Smith Jr. (SC)

=== 2020 ===
VoteVets endorsed Pete Buttigieg in the 2020 Democratic Party presidential primaries.

=== 2024 ===
In 2024, VoteVets endorsed the following candidates for House and Senate in the general election:

- Ruben Gallego (AZ-Senate)
- Elissa Slotkin (MI-Senate)
- Tammy Baldwin (WI-Senate)

=== 2026 ===
In 2026, VoteVets stated that it spent $60 million in support of 331 Democratic candidates during the 2026 elections.

== Action Fund ==
VoteVets Action Fund, the group's non-profit wing, has also been active in the paid airwaves. The first ad generated by the action fund was an ad critical of then-Democratic Senator Joe Lieberman, for "failing to ask the tough questions" on the war. The group ran a newspaper ad and radio ad, featuring Jeremy Broussard, in Connecticut. The Action Fund also commissioned a 2006 poll, conducted by pollster Celinda Lake, of troops who had returned from Iraq. That poll found many troops did not feel they were given what they needed to succeed in Iraq, and even more had faced medical, mental, and financial hardship when they returned home.

The action fund ran a television ad that gained national prominence titled, "Because of Iraq". That ad was notable because it included the image of another television ad, featuring Osama bin Laden, produced by the Republican National Committee, commonly referred to as the "ticking time bomb" ad. The ad from VoteVets begins with a series of veterans of the war explaining what they felt was a negative impact of the war in Iraq. For example, one veteran said, "Because of Iraq, there are more terrorists in the world." At the end of the VoteVets ad, General Wesley Clark says, "So if you see commercials telling you to be afraid of terrorism, remember: It's because of Iraq."

In a series of ads that may have received the most attention for the group, VoteVets presented three generals, two of whom were commanders on the ground in Iraq, who became critical of President Bush's execution of the war. They were Major General (ret.) John Batiste, Major General (ret.) Paul Eaton, and General Wesley Clark. Major General Batiste had commanded the First Infantry Division in Iraq, and Major General Eaton had been the first to be in command of rebuilding Iraqi Defense Forces after the fall of the Saddam regime. Those ads ran in the districts of Congressmen and Senators that the group felt were ready to abandon the President on the war. In fact, four targets of the ad were part of the so-called "gang of eleven" Republicans who went to the White House to complain to President Bush about the war, right after the ad aired. Though some claimed the targets of the ad were "vulnerable Republicans", some of the targets, including Reps. Fred Upton and Mike Rogers, have easily won reelection in the past, and are considered "safe" seats.

In 2008, the Action Fund undertook two major actions that received national attention. First, the organization, along with Citizens for Responsibility and Ethics in Washington exposed an internal email from a Department of Veterans Affairs center in Temple, Texas, which read in part, "Given that we are having more and more compensation seeking veterans, I'd like to suggest that we refrain from giving a diagnosis of PTSD straight out. Consider a diagnosis of Adjustment Disorder, R/O PTSD. The exposing of the email caused Senator Barack Obama to call for hearings, and for Chairman of the Veterans Affairs Committee in the Senate, Senator Daniel Akaka, to hold such hearings.

The second major action was a public push for a 21st Century GI Bill, which would boost the amount troops received in education benefits. The Action Fund backed the bipartisan legislation sponsored by Senator Jim Webb and Senator Chuck Hagel. As part of the group's efforts, it released an internet video with Brave New Films, urging the passage of the bill, with an attached petition, which received 30,000 signatures, according to the group. It also aired television ads, targeting Senators John McCain and John Cornyn, who did not support the bill.

Since that time, VoteVets Action Fund has taken on a large number of other issues, including advocating for the close of the prison at Guantanamo Bay, cutting dependence on foreign oil and fossil fuels, taking on predatory lenders that target veterans, repeal of Don’t Ask Don’t Tell, and advocating for the Iran Nuclear Deal, with senior advisor Major General (Ret.) Paul Eaton even going so far as to call Senator Tom Cotton’s attempt to dissuade Iran from entering into the deal as "mutinous."

During the Trump administration, VoteVets Action Fund took the lead in opposing the reinstatement of the ban on transgender Americans serving in the military, shifting of funds meant for military bases and families to a wall on the southern border, and a military parade for Trump to review. The group also was a leading voice in the effort to rename Army bases currently named after Confederate military officers who opposed the US military, launching an online video that was retweeted over 33,000 times.

== PAC disbursements ==
According to OpenSecrets, VoteVets PAC is both a PAC and Super PAC for Democrats and Liberal causes in sync with the Congressional Majority Pac and the Bloomberg organization. It spent over $11 million in the 2016 election cycle and over $12 million in the 2018 cycle mostly to promote firearm security.

== See also ==
Other US veterans groups

- Veterans for Peace – American organization founded in 1985 consisting of combat and peacetime veterans who work to promote alternatives to war.
- American Legion – A large organization of veterans of the United States armed forces who served in wartime. The American Legion was founded in 1919 by veterans returning from Europe after World War I.
- Veterans of Foreign Wars – Originally formed in 1914 by merging two existing veterans organizations, the VFW is composed of combat veterans of the United States armed forces who served in wartime.
- About Face: Veterans Against the War – American political advocacy organization founded by Iraq veterans. Their stated purposes are bringing an end to the occupation of Iraq, obtaining benefits for returning veterans, and bringing reparations to the Iraqi people.
- Vets For Freedom – American political advocacy organization founded by veterans of the Iraq and Afghan wars. Its stated purpose is advocacy of victory in America's ongoing War on Terrorism, and support of candidates with positions consistent with this goal.

Views on Iraq War

- Opposition to the Iraq War – Article about opposition (from outside Iraq) to the 2003 invasion of Iraq and the Iraq War in general.
- Views on the 2003 invasion of Iraq – Article containing links to several topics relating to views on the invasion, and the subsequent occupation of Iraq.
- Iraq: Opposing Viewpoints – A book in the Opposing Viewpoints series, presenting selections of contrasting viewpoints on four central questions about the Iraq War and its aftermath.

Other

- Mar-a-Lago Crowd
