= John Batiste =

American army officer (born 1952)

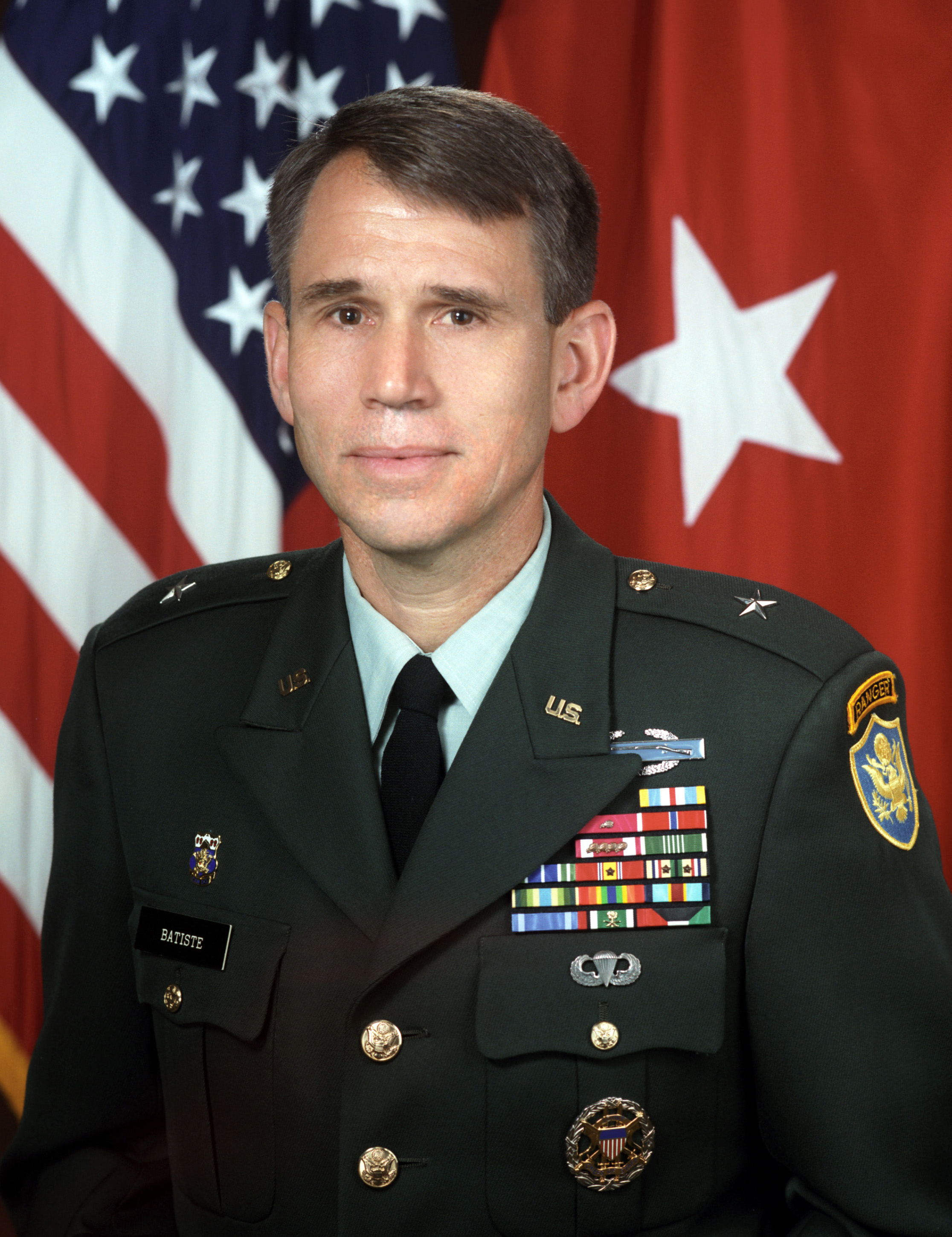
- Batiste as a Brigadier General in 2000
- Born: October 7, 1952 (age 74); Fairfax County, Virginia, U.S.
- Military career
- Allegiance: United States
- Branch: United States Army
- Service years: 1974–2005
- Rank: Major general
- Commands: 1st Infantry Division; 2nd Brigade, 1st Armored Division; 3rd Battalion, 15th Infantry Regiment
- Conflicts: Gulf War; Iraq War
- Awards: Defense Superior Service Medal; Legion of Merit; Bronze Star Medal

John Robinson Batiste (born October 7, 1952, in Fairfax County, Virginia) is a retired officer of the United States Army, author, and the co-founder of Batiste Leadership.

== Military career ==
John Batiste was commissioned as an infantry officer from West Point (Class of 1974) and served in five US Army heavy divisions over the next 31 years. He is a two-time combat veteran in both the Gulf War (brigade operations officer/S3, 24th Infantry Division) and Operation Iraqi Freedom (commanding general of the 1st Infantry Division). Previously, he commanded the 3rd Battalion, 15th Infantry Regiment, 24th Infantry Division from 1991 to 1993, served as the operations officer/G3 of the 3rd Infantry Division from 1994 to 1995, and commanded the 2nd Brigade of the 1st Armored Division from 1995 to 1997, during which time the brigade was deployed to Bosnia-Herzegovina as one of the two US brigades during the IFOR mission to implement the terms of the Dayton Peace Accords from December 1995 through November 1996. Following brigade command, he was promoted to brigadier general in 1997 and served as the plans officer for NATO's Southern Region (1997–1999), assistant division commander-maneuver of the 1st Cavalry Division (1999–2000), Joint Staff/J8 Deputy Director for Joint Warfighting Capability Assessment (2000–2001), and as the senior military assistant to the Deputy Secretary of Defense (2001–2002). While working for the Deputy Secretary of Defense, he was involved in the early planning stages of the War in Afghanistan and Iraq War. He was promoted to major general in 2002 and in the spring of 2002 General Eric Shinseki chose Batiste to be commander of the 1st Infantry Division of the United States Army, which was deployed to Iraq from February 2004 to March 2005, during the war. Batiste declined a promotion to the rank of lieutenant general and subsequently asked to be retired from active duty, because he was concerned about U.S. Defense Secretary Donald Rumsfeld's failed strategy and policies concerning the war.

== Post-military career ==
After retiring from the army as a major general in November 2005, Batiste entered into the private sector. He served as president and CEO of Klein Steel Service Inc in Rochester, NY from 2005 to 2013, during which time the company was recognized as an IndustryWeek Best Plant in 2011. He is currently president and CEO of Buffalo Armory, in Buffalo, New York. He is a past member of the board of advisors of the Johns Hopkins University Carey Business School, a board and executive committee member of the Metals Service Center Institute, a board member of the Rochester-based Veterans Outreach Center, the president of the Rochester Regional Veterans Business Council, and chair of the Warrior Salute Advisory Board (a non-profit focused on treating veterans with PTSD).

Batiste co-wrote the best-selling book, Cows in the Living Room: Developing an Effective Strategic Plan and Sustaining It. He is an active public speaker.

=== Iraq War views ===
In 2006, Batiste testified before the U.S. Senate where he criticized Donald H. Rumsfeld for a lack of leadership, and the failure of the Bush administration to develop a comprehensive strategy to deal with worldwide Islamic extremism with clearly defined goals. He said Rumsfeld "surrounded himself with like-minded, compliant subordinates who violated basic principles of war and sound military planning in the mission to change the regime in Iraq", and that the country "rushed to war without exhausting all diplomatic, political and economic options".

Batiste said, on CBS's The Early Show: "...we went to war with a flawed plan that didn't account for the hard work to build the peace after we took down the regime. We also served under a secretary of defense who didn't understand leadership, who was abusive, who was arrogant, and who didn't build a strong team."

Batiste also said: "I think the current administration repeatedly ignored sound military advice and counsel with respect to the war plans."

Regarding the idea of a "war-czar" post in president Bush's U.S. government cabinet, Batiste commented: "Standing up a war czar is just throwing in another layer of bureaucracy. Excuse me, but we have a chain of command already and it's time for our leaders to step up and take charge."

Batiste appeared on The NewsHour with Jim Lehrer in April 2006. When asked about his proposed strategy for Iraq, he said, "Well, to begin with, I think we must complete the mission in Iraq. We have no option; we need to be successful and protect our strategic interests in the region; we need to set the Iraqi people up for self-reliance with their form of representative government that takes into account tribal, religious, and ethnic complexity that has always defined Iraq. The Brits had a difficult time with that in the '10s and '20s of the last century; nothing new at all. And we must set the people of Iraq up for self-reliance so they can go on it on their own. I think we're going to be successful. There's nothing this country can't do, if we put our mind to it, but we need to do it right. We need to mobilize this country and employ a comprehensive regional and global strategy."

In May 2007, Batiste appeared in a political ad for VoteVets.org that was critical of President George W. Bush and the Iraq War. Two days later, CBS stated that appearing in the ad violated the network's regulations, and terminated his contract as a result.

In testimony before the U.S. House of Representatives in June 2007, Batiste said, "Secondary interests are that our withdrawal cannot create a humanitarian disaster or an Iraq dominated by another state(s) in the region. This may require a residual force of up to 30,000 US troops for decades to protect the US mission, train and advise the Iraqi security forces, provide a counter balance to unintended consequences of Iran and a greater "Kurdistan", and take direct action against residual Al Qaeda in Iraq. We cannot walk away from our strategic interests."

In late 2007, he asserted that the military alone would not be successful in Iraq. On December 8, 2007, Batiste co-wrote an editorial in the Washington Post stating, "Third, the counterinsurgency campaign led by Gen. David Petraeus is the correct approach in Iraq. It is showing promise of success and, if continued, will provide the Iraqi government the opportunities it desperately needs to stabilize its country. Ultimately, however, these military gains must be cemented with regional and global diplomacy, political reconciliation, and economic recover—tools yet sufficiently utilized. Today's tactical gains in Iraq—while a necessary pre-condition for political reconciliation—will crumble without a deliberate and comprehensive strategy". He argues that at the moment, such a strategy does not exist.

== Personal ==
Batiste and his sister Elizabeth are the children of John Olaf Batiste (June 30, 1922 – August 6, 1979) and Mary Day (Robinson) Batiste Payson (May 1, 1930 – July 7, 2013). Their father was a decorated infantry officer who served in World War II (Bronze Star and Purple Heart), Korea (Silver Star and second Bronze Star) and Vietnam (Legion of Merit), retiring as a colonel in 1977. Later in his military career, he was assigned to the Army War College in Carlisle, Pennsylvania, eventually serving as secretary and chief of staff for the college from 1971 to 1974. The elder Batiste was a 1969 graduate of the War College, while his son is a 1970 graduate of Carlisle Senior High School.
