= Kerri Evelyn Harris =

American activist and politician

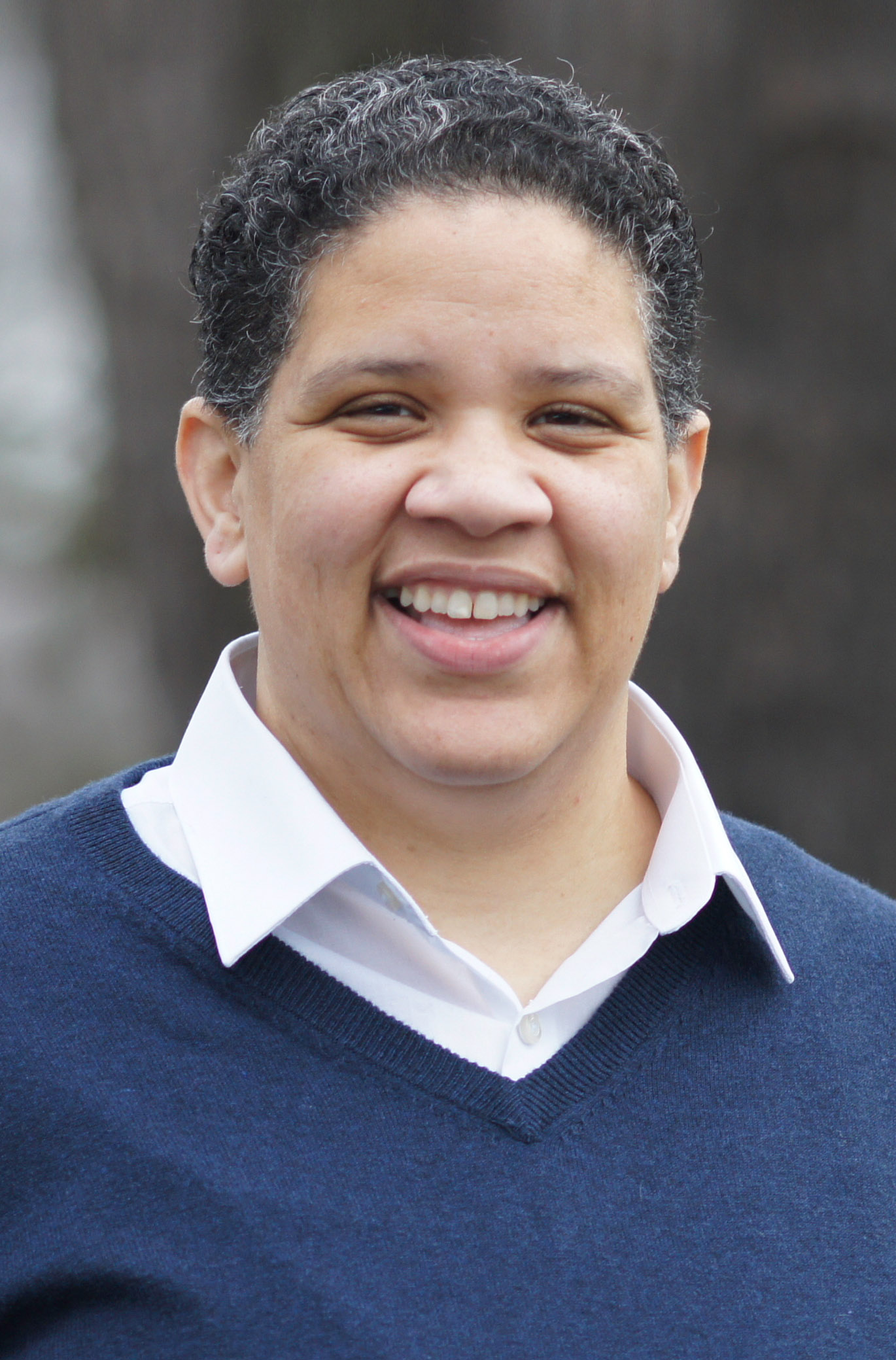

Majority Leader of the Delaware House of Representatives
- Incumbent
- Assumed office January 14, 2025
- Preceded by: Melissa Minor-Brown

Member of the Delaware House of Representatives from the 32nd district
- Incumbent
- Assumed office November 9, 2022
- Preceded by: Andria Bennett

Personal details
- Born: December 24, 1979 (age 46)
- Party: Democratic
- Children: 2
- Education: Howard Community College (AS); Wilmington University (attended)

Military service
- Allegiance: United States
- Branch: United States Air Force
- Service years: 2001–2008
- Conflict: Iraq War

Kerri Evelyn Harris (born December 24, 1979) is an American activist and politician who is the Democratic state representative for Delaware's 32nd district. She was previously a Democratic candidate for United States Senate in 2018, mounting an unsuccessful primary challenge to incumbent US Senator Tom Carper.

== Political career ==
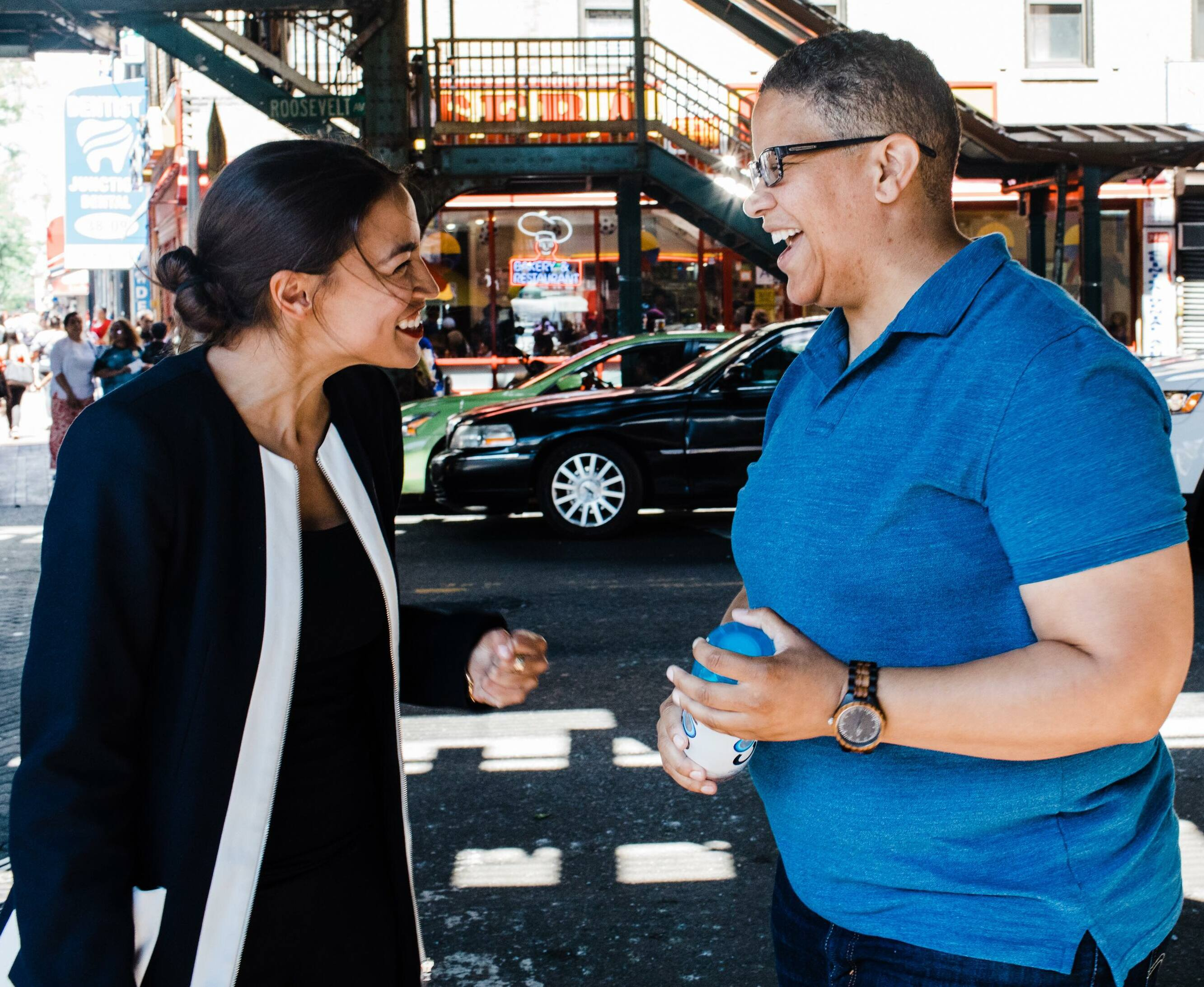
Harris with Alexandria Ocasio-Cortez in 2018

In February 2018, Harris announced that she would be challenging three-term incumbent US Senator Tom Carper in the Democratic primary election. She ran on a platform supporting Medicare for All, universal pre-K, a $15 an hour minimum wage, and criminal justice reform, among other progressive proposals. Harris identifies as a progressive, but has said she "doesn't necessarily consider herself" a democratic socialist. She received endorsements from progressive groups and individuals, including Justice Democrats, Our Revolution, state representative Sean Lynn, and future congresswomen Alexandria Ocasio-Cortez, Ilhan Omar, and Ayanna Pressley. Ocasio-Cortez held multiple rallies with Harris in Delaware after Harris assisted her with her own successful primary campaign against incumbent congressman Joe Crowley. Harris lost to incumbent Senator Tom Carper in the September 2018 primary, receiving 35% of the vote. Despite her loss, Harris received the highest vote share of a Democratic primary candidate challenging a statewide incumbent in Delaware in 20 years.

Harris announced in January 2022 that she would be launching a campaign for the Delaware House of Representatives in the 32nd district. Harris defeated three other candidates in the Democratic primary, receiving 65% of the vote. She defeated Republican Cheryl Precourt in the general election on November 8, 2022, by a 16-point margin.

Following Carper's retirement announcement in 2023, it was reported that Harris was looking at a 2024 run for U.S. House, since the seat will be vacant due to incumbent Representative Lisa Blunt Rochester's campaign for Carper's U.S. Senate seat. Harris ultimately decided against running.

In June 2023, Harris was elected majority whip for the Democrats in the Delaware House of Representatives.

== Personal life ==
Harris lives in Dover, Delaware. She joined the United States Air Force in 2001 following the September 11 terrorist attacks, served as a loadmaster, and retired from active duty in 2008. Harris is a lesbian and an African American. She has two children.

== Electoral history ==
2018 United States Senate Democratic primary results
Party	Candidate	Votes	%
Democratic	Tom Carper (incumbent)	53,633	64.6%
Democratic	Kerri Evelyn Harris	29,406	35.4%
Total votes		83,039	100%

2022 Delaware House of Representatives 32nd district Democratic primary
Party	Candidate	Votes	%
Democratic	Kerri Evelyn Harris	725	64.6%
Democratic	Phil McGinnis	270	24.0%
Democratic	Lamont C. Pierce	76	6.8%
Democratic	Lavaughn McCutchen	52	4.6%
Total votes		1,123	100%

2022 Delaware House of Representatives 32nd district general election
Party	Candidate	Votes	%
Democratic	Kerri Evelyn Harris	2,691	58.0%
Republican	Cheryl Precourt	1,951	42.0%
Total votes		4,642	100%
Democratic hold			

Delaware House of Representatives
Preceded by Melissa Minor-Brown	Majority Leader of the Delaware House of Representatives; 2025–present	Incumbent
