= The People for Bernie Sanders =

Political movement formed in 2015

- Formation: 2015
- Type: Grassroots movement
- Purpose: Progressive U.S. politics
- Location: United States
- Members: Over 1 million supporters
- Founders: Charles Lenchner; Winnie Wong
- Website: People for Bernie website People for Bernie Facebook

The People for Bernie Sanders (also known as People for Bernie) is a grassroots movement that arose to support the candidacy of Bernie Sanders during the Bernie Sanders 2016 presidential campaign. People for Bernie, independent from the official campaign and largely organized via social media, grew to over 1 million followers on Facebook. Founded by Occupy Wall Street participants, People for Bernie Sanders became a major organizing force for progressive figures during the 2016 presidential campaign, responsible for coining the hashtag #feelthebern. People for Bernie is closely linked to other progressive groups like National Nurses United and Democratic Socialists of America.

== Origins ==
People for Bernie was founded in early 2015 by Charles Lenchner and Winnie Wong, several months before the official campaign announcement on April 30, 2015. Their strategy and goals were heavily influenced by lessons learned during Occupy Wall Street, particularly the need for activist groups to demonstrate impact on electoral politics. Lenchner was a founder of Ready for Warren, a grassroots movement that aimed to convince Elizabeth Warren to run for president in 2016, and eventually endorsed Sanders. Many early supporters of People for Bernie emerged from the same group. People for Bernie officially launched with an open letter released the same day Sanders declared his candidacy for president. The letter was co-signed by notable representatives from progressive groups like Occupy Wall Street, Progressive Democrats of America, Coffee Party USA, Jacobin magazine, and Democratic Socialists of America. Around the same time, People for Bernie created a number of constituency groups to support Sanders's candidacy, notably Millennials for Bernie Sanders. These groups were entirely volunteer-run with little oversight from the main group. Activists including Moumita Ahmed (Millennials for Bernie Sanders), Stan L. Williams (African-Americans for Bernie), and Kat Brezler (National Digital Director) had leadership roles.

== Activities ==
=== 2016 primary ===
Early in the 2016 primary campaign, People for Bernie helped mobilize over 100,000 people in house parties and grassroots events across the country. Building on the success of #feelthebern, People for Bernie began networking with groups around the country to build support for Sanders's candidacy, organizing conference calls and social media collaborations.

Organizers Charles Lenchner, Kat Brezler, and Moumita Ahmed were Sanders delegates at the 2016 Democratic National Convention. Other People for Bernie supporters became formally involved the Sanders campaign, including Max Cotterill, who worked on Sanders's Digital Organizing team, and Shana East, who went on to become the Illinois Digital and Volunteer Coordinator. The deepening relationship between the Sanders campaign and People for Bernie (and other similar groups) was credited with helping Sanders break small-donor fundraising records.

=== People's Summit ===
In June 2016, People for Bernie Sanders was instrumental, together with National Nurses United, in organizing the People's Summit in Chicago. This was the first time that Sanders supporters from across the country came together to coordinate efforts. National Nurses United also funded People for Bernie, through a PAC called Progressive Kick, to expand their social media efforts.

=== 2016 general election ===
People for Bernie never formally endorsed Hillary Clinton, as Sanders did on July 12, 2016. The movement had as members Sanders supporters who later campaigned actively for Clinton, as well as some who actively opposed her. The latter were sometimes known as the "Bernie or Bust" movement. It was widely recognized that social media played much more significant role during the 2016 election than in any previous election.

=== Post-election ===
After the November 8, 2016, election, People for Bernie Sanders began working with other progressive groups to organize against President-elect Trump. Wong helped organize the Women's March on Washington, and People for Bernie collaborated with Fight for 15, supporters of single-payer healthcare, environmental activists like 350.org, and immigrants rights groups, among other local groups. People for Bernie also publicly supported Keith Ellison for Chairman of the Democratic National Committee.

On November 8, 2017, Wong reportedly refused to participate in a European United Left–Nordic Green Left panel at the European Parliament in Brussels because CIA whistleblower John Kiriakou had been invited to join it. Kiriakou spent two and a half years in prison for revealing the use of waterboarding. According to Kiriakou, Wong did not want to appear with him because he hosted a radio show on the Sputnik network, and the organizers of the panel removed him. Kiriakou participated in a later panel.

== Decentralized organizing model ==
The People for Bernie Sanders claims a decentralized organizing model that descends from the Occupy Movement. Their core operating principle is a "permission machine" – volunteers bring ideas to the group, and the group helps them achieve their goals without any centralized decision-making process.
