= Guido Girgenti =

American activist (born 1991 or 1992)

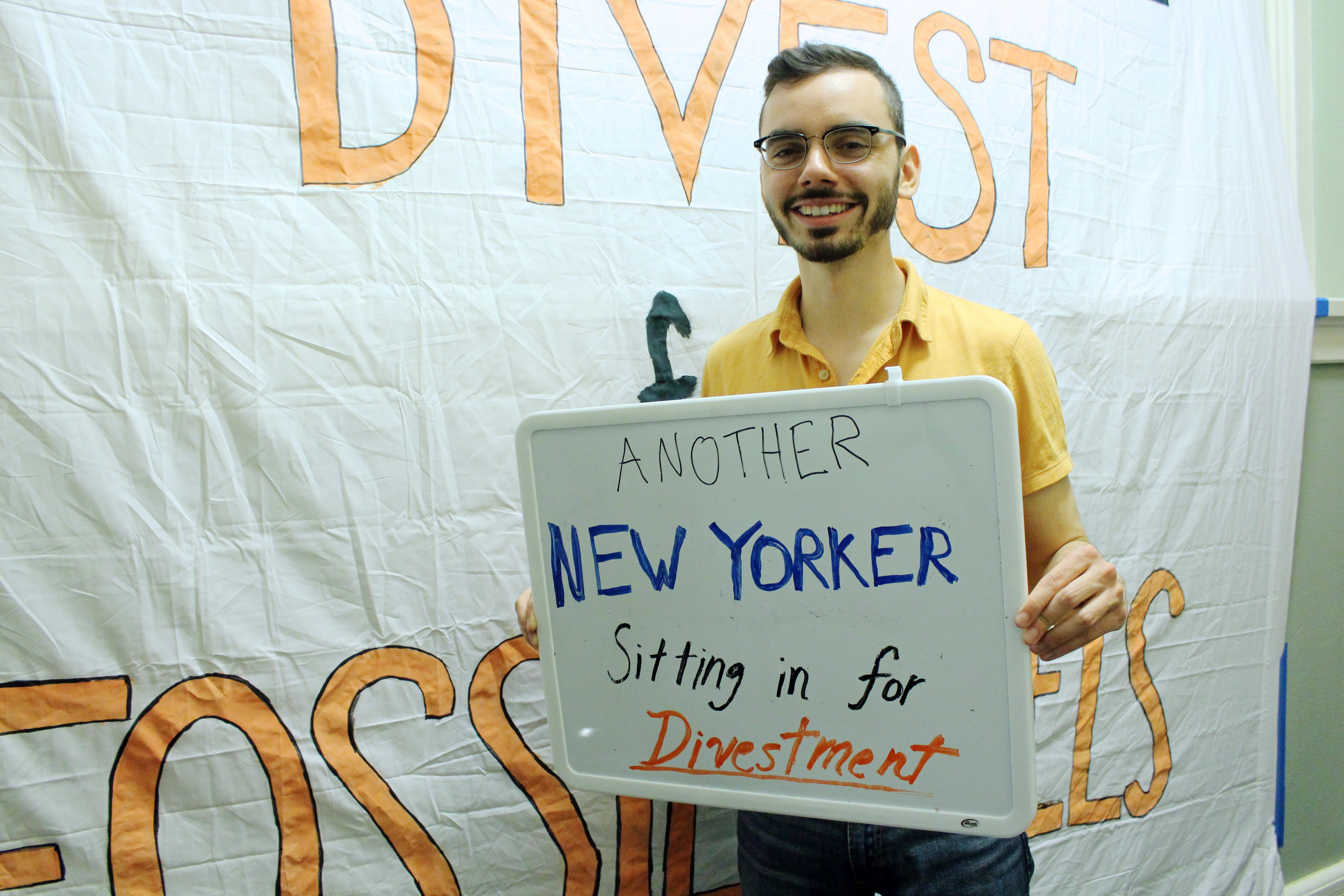
- Girgenti in 2015
- Born: 1991 or 1992 (age 34); Brooklyn, New York, U.S.
- Education: Occidental College (transfer); Swarthmore College
- Movement: Progressive, Environmental justice

Guido Girgenti (born 1991 or 1992) is an American activist best known for co-founding the Sunrise Movement, an organization that advocates political action on climate change. He has also worked on communications for Justice Democrats on campaigns to elect candidates who support a Green New Deal such as Cori Bush, Alexandria Ocasio-Cortez, Jamaal Bowman, and others.

== Early life ==
Guido Girgenti grew up in Brooklyn. Girgenti told the New York Times that a formative moment for his political beliefs was when he went on a volunteer trip to New Orleans in the aftermath of Hurricane Katrina to "view it through the lens of racial and economic injustice." In 2010 he began attending Occidental College to study Urban and Environmental Policy. After two years he left to become east coast coordinator of community organizing group 99 Rise, a position he stayed in for a year. He then began attending Swarthmore College in 2015 and to pursue a degree in political science.

While at Swarthmore, Girgenti was a regular contributor to the Global Nonviolent Action Database.

== Career ==
=== Occupy Los Angeles ===
While at Occidental College, Girgenti was among a group of 45 students and 30 adults who started the Occupy Los Angeles protests as part of the larger Occupy Wall Street mass protests against economic inequality and corporate greed. Girgenti received a $747 grant from the college's political science department to stay in Los Angeles over winter break to volunteer for Occupy Los Angeles and write a paper on the Occupy Wall Street movement. This enabled him to develop training on nonviolent protest and direct-action for attendees.

On November 11, 2011, Girgenti was named Activist of the Month by Occidental College.

Girgenti was arrested on November 29, 2011 for failure to disperse, but no charges were filed.

In 2016, Girgenti credited the Occupy Movement with jumpstarting the climate movement.

=== Swarthmore Mountain Justice ===
Much like other activists who would later go on to found Sunrise Movement, Girgenti was involved in efforts at Swarthmore College to divest the college's endowment from fossil fuels as part of a group called Mountain Justice. Girgenti participated in a sit-in to pressure the college administrators that lasted 32 days. He was an organizer of the sit-in.

"In the face of such an unprecedented crisis such as the climate crisis, we have to ask ourselves what is the greatest source of power we have. Our endowment is one of the greatest sources of power that we have, and it is perhaps the most powerful thing we can do to take that endowment and say we are no longer going to invest in an industry that is incompatible with a just and sustainable future that perpetuates social and economic injustice across the world."

— Guido Girgenti, 2014

1,100 faculty and alumni and 970 students (61 percent of the student body) signed a petition in favor of divestment. It even received support from Christiana Figueres, the United Nations climate chief, who graduated from Swarthmore in 1979. Despite the support, the college's board rejected the proposal. Had the college divested, it would have become the largest college endowment to do so, with over $1.9 billion. It was not the first time that the board had rejected the proposal, again citing a desire to maximize investment returns.

=== Sunrise Movement ===
The idea to found the group came after a 2015 march to the White House organized by various climate groups. In the summer of 2016, Girgenti and about a dozen others trained at Momentum, an organization that teaches community organizing.

In 2015, Girgenti co-founded Sunrise Movement with William Lawrence, Sara Blazevic, Victoria Fernandez, Varshini Prakash, and two others. The organization officially launched in 2017 with the goal to be a more confrontational environmental movement and utilize civil disobedience and non-violent protest to effect political change. They were inspired by past movements like Act Up, the anti-apartheid movement, and the anti-nuclear movement. The group also organized to elect politicians who would be strong supporters of renewable energy in the 2018 midterm elections, both in the Democratic primaries and the general election. Their goals on climate policy developed into the environmental program known as the Green New Deal. Girgenti acted as the organization's communications advisor.

In 2018, together with Justice Democrats and Alexandria Ocasio-Cortez, Blazevic and a group of other Sunrise members organized a sit-in in the office of Speaker of the House Nancy Pelosi. She was also responsible for ensuring that no one under 18 got arrested. Sunrise organized a similar event in February 2019, bringing a group of young people to confront Senator Dianne Feinstein in her office.

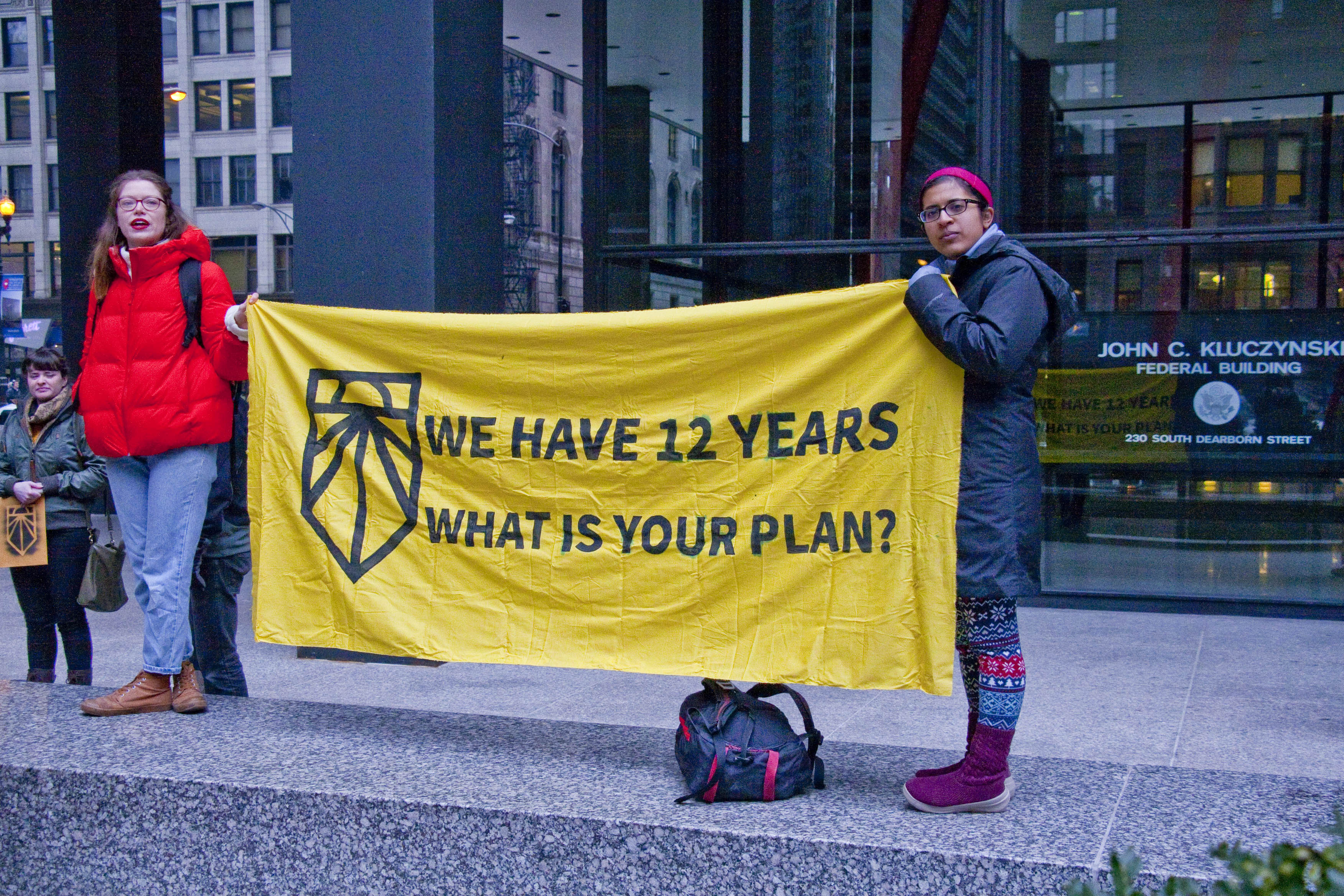
Members of the Sunrise Movement hold a banner that says "We have 12 years, what is your plan?" (2019)

By November 2019, Inside Philanthropy reported that the group had grown to 1,140 monthly donors, and had 90 volunteer hubs pop up in six weeks, across 33 states.

In 2020, Girgenti and Prakash edited a series of essays on climate change written by activists, policymakers, and journalists including Naomi Klein, William Barber II, Mariana Mazzucato, Rhiana Gunn-Wright, Joseph Stiglitz, Bill McKibben, Mary Kay Henry, David Wallace-Wells, and Kate Aronoff. They released the collection as a book titled Winning the Green New Deal: Why We Must, How We Can. In their review, Publishers Weekly said "By selecting contributors wisely, Prakash and Girgenti offer both a comprehensive representation of the climate movement and a practical road map for change. Young progressives will be especially affected by this impassioned and eloquent plea for progress." Socialist Alternative was more critical, stating "Unfortunately their strategy to win involves staying within the lanes of capitalism, a system that created and is unable to deal with this existential crisis."

=== Justice Democrats ===
By 2021, Girgenti was the media director of the Justice Democrats and was involved in the group's successful congressional election upsets by Jamaal Bowman and Cori Bush, as well as some candidates that were not successful like Jess King. He also created the group's podcast, Bloc Party, which ran from November 16, 2020 until June 29, 2023.

"For as long as I've been old enough to be conscious of politics, all I've known is a Democratic Party that has defined itself as ‘We’re less bad than Republicans.' With [Justice Democrats] and Sunrise, the starting point is more like, 'If we as a society didn’t accept the busted logic of anti-government austerity, what would that allow us to do?'"

— Guido Girgenti, in 2021

== Personal life ==
As of 2021, Girgenti lived in the Flatbush neighborhood of Brooklyn with his girlfriend Sara Blazevic.

== Bibliography ==
- Prakash, Varshini; Girgenti, Guido, eds. (August 25, 2020). Winning the Green New Deal: Why We Must, How We Can. Simon & Schuster. ISBN 198214243X.

== See also ==
- Sunrise Movement
- Green New Deal
- Justice Democrats
- Progressivism in the United States
