= To the End (2022 film) =

To The End
- Theatrical release poster
- Directed by: Rachel Lears
- Produced by: Sabrina Schmidt Gordon
- Starring: Alexandria Ocasio-Cortez; Rhiana Gunn-Wright; Varshini Prakash; Alexandra Rojas
- Edited by: Robin Blotnick
- Music by: Ryan Blotnick
- Distributed by: Roadside Attractions
- Release dates: January 23, 2022 (Sundance Film Festival); December 9, 2022
- Running time: 103 minutes
- Country: United States
- Language: English
- Box office: $15,801

To the End is a 2022 American documentary film directed by Rachel Lears. The film focuses on climate change and features U.S. Representative Alexandria Ocasio-Cortez, Varshini Prakash, the co-founder of the Sunrise Movement, Alexandra Rojas, executive director of the Justice Democrats, and Rhiana Gunn-Wright, the climate policy director for the Roosevelt Institute. The film debuted at the 2022 Sundance Film Festival and was presented at the Tribeca Film Festival in June 2022.

== Reception ==
The film was generally well received by critics. On the review aggregator website Rotten Tomatoes, 85% of 20 critics' reviews are positive, with an average rating of 6.5/10. The film failed to meet expectations at the box office. During its opening weekend, it was shown on 120 screens across the United States, earning $9,667.
