= Rachel Lears =

American independent documentary filmmaker

Rachel Lears is an American independent documentary filmmaker. She is the director of Knock Down the House (2019), a documentary film about four women running for Congress in the 2018 midterms, including Alexandria Ocasio-Cortez. The film premiered at Sundance Film Festival in January 2019 and was sold to Netflix for $10 million, releasing on May 1, 2019. Her other documentaries include The Hand That Feeds (2014), about undocumented immigrant workers in a labor dispute with owners at a Manhattan bakery café, and To the End (2022), about climate change.

== Life and education ==
Lears graduated from Yale University in 1999, with a BA in Music before earning an MA in Ethnomusicology, an Advanced Certificate in Culture and Media, and a PhD in Cultural Anthropology from New York University. Her doctoral dissertation, titled Between Two Monsters: Popular Music, Visual Media, and the Rise of Global Indie in 21st Century Uruguay and published in 2012, focuses on the first generation of young Uruguayan artists to come-of-age with digital media. Lears is married to Robin Blotnick, and they have a son.

Lears has published numerous articles for In These Times magazine, an independent, nonprofit magazine dedicated to advancing democracy and economic justice. Published works include Acoustic Ecology in 2004, What's Up Silverdocs? in 2007, The End of Indie? in 2010, and The Death and Life of Occupy in 2012.

Lears wrote original music for The Mystery Keys, along with a variety of musicians based in New York City and Montevideo, Uruguay from 2006 to 2010. The Mystery Keys released an EP called “Dance Big People” in January 2009.

Lears has collaborated with artist Saya Woolfalk on video art projects that have screened at numerous international galleries and museums since 2008. She was also the 2013 Sundance Creative Producing Fellow during production of The Hand That Feeds.

== Jubilee Films ==
Jubilee Films is a production company started by Lears and Blotnick. According to the company's website, the production house's mission is "to tell smart, nuanced, entertaining stories that transcend borders, engage audiences from all walks of life, and challenge popular assumptions".

== Filmography ==
=== Aves de paso/Birds of Passage (2009) ===
Aves de paso (Birds of Passage) is a film about two songwriters who live and perform in Montevideo: Ernesto Diaz, an author and percussionist from Artigas, Uruguay, and Yisela Sosa, a vocalist from Paysandu, Uruguay. Their music reflects their personal journeys of moving away from small hometowns to fulfill career aspirations.

Aves de paso premiered in Montevideo, Uruguay in 2009. It also received a Certificate of Outstanding Achievement in International Feature Film at the Williamsburg International Film Festival and had a national television broadcast in Brazil on Canal Futura in 2010.

=== The Hand That Feeds (2014) ===
The Hand That Feeds (2014) chronicles Undocumented immigrant workers who spar with their employers over low wages and poor work conditions. Mahoma Lopez and other workers at a Hot & Crusty bakery café in New York City send a list of demands to the owners and attempt to unionize after a period of silence. The workers have to win an election at the National Labor Relations Board in order to become a union. Amidst growing support for the workers, they win in a 12–8 decision, but they still have to negotiate terms with management. The company settles with the union workers but then closes a month later. The workers open a makeshift coffee shop on the street in front of Hot & Crusty, while the owners look for new investors. A potential new owner, Anthony Iluzzi, comes to the storefront to meet with Mahoma. Iluzzi is open to cooperating with the workers, but the landlord begins negotiations with Pax, a rival deli chain. The workers continue to protest outside the storefront, and Pax loses interest in the space. After two months of negotiations with Iluzzi, the Hot & Crusty location reopens with an updated contract between workers and owners that includes a voice in the hiring process and other increased benefits.

The film follows various characters who are each motivated by the abusive work conditions: Mahoma Lopez, Margarito Lopez, and Gonzalo Jimenez are sandwich makers at Hot & Crusty bakery café, and Diana O. and Gretel A. are cashiers. Nastaran Mohit, Ezequiel Martinez, and others from the Laundry Workers Center join in activism for the workers, and Anthony Iluzzi comes to an agreement through negotiations as the new owner.

The Hand That Feeds was produced by Jubilee Films in association with Latino Public Broadcasting, Chicken & Egg Pictures, and Vineyard Point Productions, with significant contributions provided by the Corporation for Public Broadcasting. The film was also supported by the Sundance Institute Documentary Film Program, The Cinereach Project at Sundance Institute, New York State Council on the Arts, Movement Resource Group, BRITDOC and Bertha BRITDOC Connect Fund, and New York Times Op-Docs. The film was a sponsored project of IFP and supported by Tribeca Film Institute, Good Pitch NY 2013, Sundance Creative Producing Lab and Summit 2013 and Independent Film Week Spotlight on Documentaries 2013.

The Hand That Feeds premiered at the Full Frame Documentary Film Festival on April 5, 2014, where it won the Audience Award for Best Feature. It also won the Audience Award at DOC NYC. It screened at the 2014 AFI Docs.

On June 21, 2016, The Hand That Feeds aired as Episode 19 of Season 4 of America ReFramed on the World Channel.

The Hand That Feeds received generally favorable reviews. It has a 93% rating on Rotten Tomatoes based on 15 reviews. On Metacritic, which assigns a normalized rating to reviews, the film has a weighted average score of 63 out of 100, based on 7 critics, indicating “generally favorable reviews”. Odie Henderson, writing for RogerEbert.com, said that "It has a beautiful, low-key approach that earns its cheers and tears without resorting to the manipulative or dramatic tricks of a typical feature film." Diana Clarke of Village Voice praised the strength of Lopez as a character, noting that he is a “singularly tender, compelling, and articulate campaigner in this high-stakes struggle for justice", while Jen Chaney of The Dissolve commented on Lears and Blotnick's ability to build the documentary around an ensemble cast. However, Martin Tsai of the Los Angeles Times considered the effort the squandering of a worthy subject. Tsai argued that the film "rarely substantiates the hardships workers and does not put their quality of life into any kind of statistical perspective", while also criticizing the film's "lighthearted digressions" and for allowing "white legal volunteers and Occupy Wall Street protesters to hijack the restaurant workers' story".

=== Knock Down the House (2019) ===
Knock Down The House follows three congressional campaigns and one campaign for US Senate in the 2018 Democratic primaries. Alexandria Ocasio-Cortez challenges Rep. Joe Crowley in New York's 14th District, Paula Swearengin challenges Senator Joe Manchin in West Virginia, Amy Vilela challenges Steven Horsford in Nevada's 4th district, and Cori Bush challenges Lacy Clay in Missouri's 1st District. The film shows these four women run their insurgent campaigns in attempts to take on establishment Democrats.

Alexandria Ocasio-Cortez became a political star as a result of the 2018 midterms. She ran as a challenger in a district that hadn't had a democratic primary in at least 20 years. Joe Crowley was known as an influential figure in the Democratic political machine in New York and in Washington. Ocasio-Cortez's energy and organizing effort led to a 57-43 upset victory on June 26, 2018, which nearly guaranteed a victory in the general election in the heavily Democratic district. The four women work in coordination with Justice Democrats and Brand New Congress, organizations that work to provide alternative paths to leadership so that working people have representation in Congress.

Lears started working on a project about insurgent Democrats after Donald Trump's 2016 election victory. She reached out to Brand New Congress and Justice Democrats to find “charismatic female candidates who weren't career politicians, but had become newly galvanized to represent their communities”. Lears raised $28,111 for the project via Kickstarter. Lears and Robin Blotnick used grant money and Kickstarter funds to follow each candidate for two weeks before their respective primary. Blotnick would edit the film while they were traveling and shooting in Las Vegas and St. Louis. Knock Down the House was supported by The Doc Society, IDA Enterprise Documentary Fund, Artemis Rising Foundation, Chicago Media Project, Wavelength Productions. Perspective Fund, Threshold Foundation's High Impact Documentary Funding Circle, the Gucci Tribeca Documentary Fund, Solidaire Action Fund, and Puffin Foundation. Knock Down the House is a sponsored project of IFP, with distribution advisory services from Cinetic Media.

The film premiered at Sundance Film Festival and was released on May 1, 2019. At Sundance, it won the Festival Favorite Award. The film also screened at the True/False Film Fest, the Athena Film Festival, SXSW, Full Frame Documentary Film Festival, and Hot Docs International Documentary Festival.

Knock Down the House holds an approval rating of 99% based on 108 reviews on the review aggregator website Rotten Tomatoes. On Metacritic, which assigns a normalized rating to reviews, the film has an average score of 85 of 100, based on 11 critic reviews, which indicates “universal acclaim”.

Richard Roeper of the Chicago Sun-Times praised the “excellent job of weaving in the stories of the three equally impressive candidates” and called Ocasio-Cortez "the unquestioned star of the stirring and inspirational documentary". Kenneth Turan of the Los Angeles Times noted that Lears "captured lightning in a bottle and now shows us the very genuine person behind the media firestorm". Kate Erbland of IndieWire praised the film's climactic moments, observing that the conclusion "has all the joy of anything written for the big screen, the kind of crowd-pleasing, fist-pumping, jaw-dropping final sequence of events that prove how much more compelling real-life can be than its fictionalized counterparts".

=== To the End (2022) ===
To the End focuses on the effects of climate change. It features Ocasio-Cortez, Varshini Prakash, the co-founder of the Sunrise Movement, Alexandra Rojas, executive director of the Justice Democrats, and Rhiana Gunn-Wright, the climate policy director for the Roosevelt Institute. The film debuted at the 2022 Sundance Film Festival and was presented at the Tribeca Film Festival in June 2022.
