= Rhiana Gunn-Wright =

American political scientist (born 1988)

Rhiana Gunn Wright
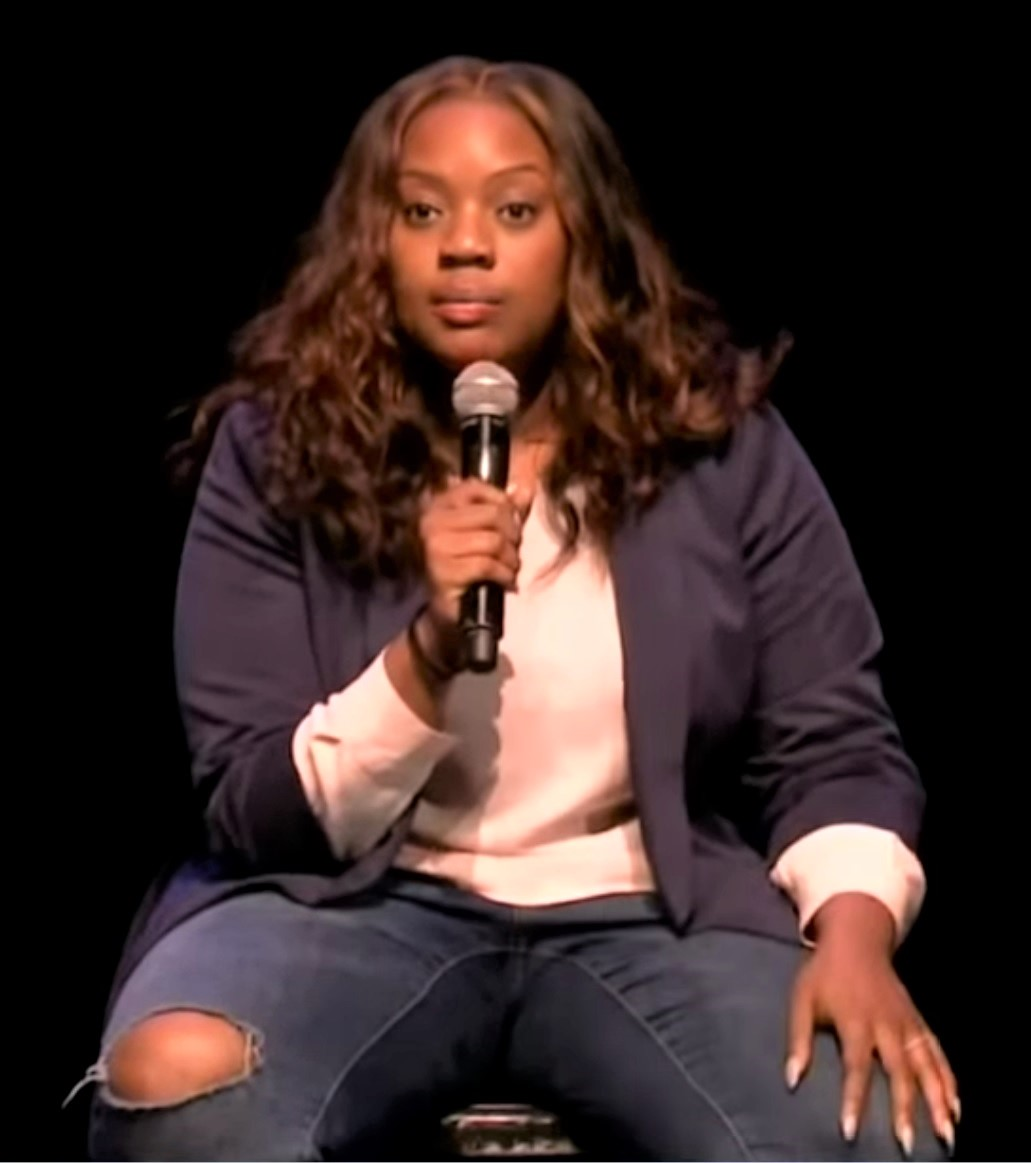
- Rhiana Gunn-Wright speaks at the Road to a Green New Deal Tour in 2019
- Born: 1988 (age 37–38)
- Education: Yale University; University of Oxford; Institute for Women's Policy Research
- Political party: Democratic Party of the United States
- Movement: Green New Deal

Rhiana Gunn-Wright (born 1988) is the Climate Policy Director at the Roosevelt Institute. She has worked with Alexandria Ocasio-Cortez as an author of the Green New Deal. Gunn-Wright was educated at Yale, before becoming a Rhodes Scholar at the University of Oxford in 2013.

== Early life and education ==
Gunn-Wright grew up in Englewood in the South Side of Chicago, where the local population are more likely to suffer from asthma because of their proximity to pollution. She was raised by her mother and her grandmother. At the age of fourteen Gunn-Wright moved to the Illinois Mathematics and Science Academy in Aurora, Illinois. Her asthma disappeared after a short amount of time. Gunn-Wright attended Yale University for her undergraduate degree, majored in African-American studies and graduated with honours in 2011. During her studies she worked with the community in New Haven, helping at the Polly McCabe Centre for pregnant adolescents. The centre offers parenting classes and health care to young mothers. She was inspired by the New Haven Promise initiative as a way to break the cycle of disadvantage. After graduating she joined the Institute for Women's Policy Research as a research fellow. Here she worked alongside Heidi Hartmann on paid maternity leave. In 2013 Gunn-Wright was selected as a Rhodes Scholar at the University of Oxford where she studied social policy.

== Research and career ==
After graduating, Gunn-Wright served as an intern to Michelle Obama. Gunn-Wright was appointed policy lead for Abdul El-Sayed's campaign for governor of Michigan. When he asked her to join his campaign, she asked if he was certain: "Are you sure? Because you’re very Muslim and I’m very Black, and this is Michigan." For El-Sayed, Gunn-Wright set out a bold policy agenda, including state-funded access to the internet and a shift to all renewable energy by 2030.

Gunn-Wright was head hunted by the Alexandria Ocasio-Cortez campaign to join New Consensus, a think-tank championed by Ocasio-Cortez in Washington, D.C. For some time New Consensus had been working with the Sunrise Movement on the development of an environmental policy program and with the Justice Democrats on identifying new progressive candidates. The Justice Democrats helped Ocasio-Cortez run her campaign, New Consensus appointed Gunn-Wright policy director in which capacity she has worked with Desmond Drummer on the Green New Deal. To Gunn-Wright, climate policy has always been connected to social justice. For example, over one million African-American people live half a mile from an oil and gas facility, and six million live in the same county as a refinery. She has established a "climate mobilisation office", through which she works on climate change policy. Gunn-Wright has called for Advanced Research Projects Agency–Energy (ARPA-E) to be as generously funded as DARPA, and the creation of a green bank that will offer financing to communities that do not have access to clean water or transportation. The Green New Deal includes a plan for 100% renewable energy, net zero greenhouse gas emissions, sustainable jobs and high-quality healthcare. She has since been involved with the Ocasio-Cortez town halls and the CNN climate town hall. Gunn-Wright appeared in Rachel Lears' 2022 documentary film, To the End, which focuses on the effects of climate change. The film debuted at the 2022 Sundance Film Festival and was presented at the Tribeca Film Festival in June 2022.

She has written for The Guardian and was included in Time magazine's list of the top women fighting to end climate change. Gunn-Wright was a signatory on the Women Lead Climate campaign.
