= William Lawrence (Michigan politician) =

American politician and activist (born 1990)

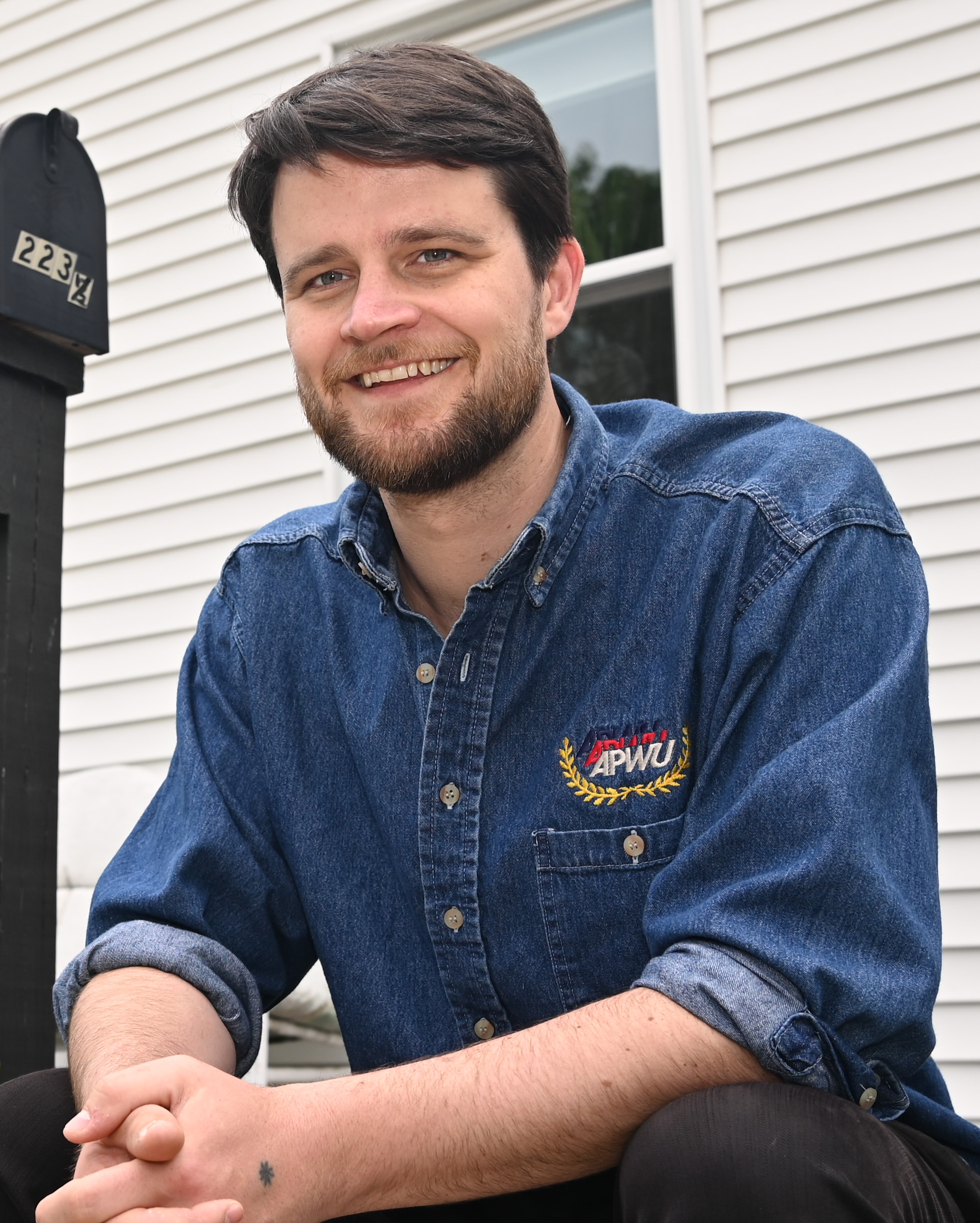
- Lawrence in 2026

Member-elect of the U.S. House of Representatives from Michigan's 7th district
- Assuming office January 3, 2027
- Succeeding: Tom Barrett

Personal details
- Born: William Michael Lawrence; August 23, 1990 (age 36) Madison, Wisconsin, U.S.
- Party: Democratic
- Other political affiliations: Working Families Party; Democratic Socialists of America (until July 2026) (Note: The Democratic Socialists of America (DSA) are not a registered political party. Instead, they are a political organization for those with democratic socialist ideologies.)
- Spouse: Dinah
- Education: Swarthmore College (BA)
- Website: Campaign website

William Michael Lawrence (born August 23, 1990) is an American politician and activist who co-founded the Sunrise Movement, a climate action organization. A member of the Democratic Party, Lawrence is the U.S. representative-elect for Michigan's 7th congressional district after winning the 2026 election.

Lawrence graduated from Swarthmore College with a bachelor's degree in sociology and anthropology. In 2015, he co-founded the Sunrise Movement to help elect politicians focused on climate policy, protest on behalf of the environmental movement, and support the Green New Deal.

In August 2025, Lawrence announced his candidacy for Michigan's 7th congressional district, winning the Democratic primary in August 2026. He challenged incumbent Republican Tom Barrett in the general election. In November 2026, he won his election against Barrett. He is described as a progressive Democrat.

== Early life ==
William Michael Lawrence was born in Madison, Wisconsin, in 1990 and moved to East Lansing, Michigan, as a child when his parents became law professors at Michigan State University. He graduated from East Lansing High School in 2008. After attending Whitman College in Washington for one year, he transferred to Swarthmore College, where he earned a degree in sociology and anthropology. He remained in the Philadelphia area for several years before returning to Lansing around 2016.

At Swarthmore, Lawrence was involved in campaigns to convince the college to divest from fossil fuels, echoing student activity during the anti-Apartheid movement in the United States. After graduation, he founded a nonprofit, the Fossil Fuel Divestment Student Network, and invited Varshini Prakash to join. The rest of the group of activists who would later found the Sunrise Movement met at a 2015 march to the White House. In the summer of 2016, Lawrence and about a dozen others trained at Momentum, an organization that teaches community organizing.

In July 2013, at age 22, Lawrence was one of 11 protesters arrested at an Enbridge pipeline work site near Stockbridge in Ingham County, where the company was expanding the capacity of its Line 6B pipeline, which had ruptured in the 2010 Kalamazoo River oil spill. As an act of civil disobedience, he locked himself to construction equipment and declined to release himself when warned by a sheriff's sergeant that he could be charged; deputies cut the protesters free. Lawrence was charged with resisting and obstructing a police officer, a felony under Michigan law, and with misdemeanor trespassing. He pleaded guilty to the felony, the trespassing charge was dismissed, and he was sentenced to fines and probation. The conviction was later expunged.

== Early career ==
=== Sunrise Movement ===
Lawrence at a fossil fuel divestment event in 2015, the same year he co-founded the Sunrise Movement.

Lawrence co-founded the Sunrise Movement in 2015 alongside Sara Blazevic, Victoria Fernandez, Guido Girgenti, and Varshini Prakash. When officially launched in 2017, the movement's goal was to be a more confrontational environmental movement and utilize civil disobedience and protest, similar to ACT UP and the anti-nuclear movement. The group also organized to elect politicians who would be strong supporters of renewable energy in the 2018 midterm elections, both in the Democratic primaries and the general election. Their goals on climate policy developed into the environmental program known as the Green New Deal. Lawrence originally acted as the organization's Development Director, but in 2020 he was the director of strategic partnerships.

In 2018, together with Justice Democrats and Alexandria Ocasio-Cortez, Lawrence and a group of other Sunrise members organized a sit-in in the office of Speaker of the House Nancy Pelosi. Sunrise organized a similar event in February 2019, bringing a group of young people to confront Senator Dianne Feinstein in her office.

By November 2019, Lawrence told Inside Philanthropy that the group had grown to 1,140 monthly donors, and had 90 volunteer hubs pop up in six weeks, across 33 states.

"We believe at our core that the only successful social movements in American history are powered by the unpaid effort of tens of thousands of people, and we've always strived to build an organization that wasn't asking how many staff can we hire, but how many people can we engage as volunteers."

— William Lawrence, in 2019

Lawrence left the Sunrise Movement in 2020.

=== Housing advocacy ===
In 2020, Lawrence founded the Mid-Michigan Tenant Resource Center and became focused on housing advocacy in Michigan as a coordinator for the Michigan Rent Is Too Damn High coalition, a tenant union. Despite his prominent role as a cofounder of a large national organization, the Lansing City Pulse said that locally, he is best known for his housing advocacy and tenant organizing.

== Political career ==
=== 2026 congressional campaign ===
Lawrence (standing at back) with Michigan's Democratic delegation in November 2026.

Lawrence announced his candidacy for the Democratic Party nomination for U.S. Representative in Michigan's 7th congressional district on August 26, 2025. The seat was held by Tom Barrett, a Republican.

A progressive, Lawrence has been endorsed by the Working Families Party and National Nurses United. He has also been endorsed by the Michigan Democratic Party Progressive Caucus, Showing Up for Racial Justice, Sunrise Movement, Track AIPAC, and Bernie Sanders.

During the 2025 government shutdown, Lawrence organized a 36-hour sit-in outside incumbent Rep. Barrett's Lansing district office to protest a lapse in Supplemental Nutrition Assistance Program (SNAP) federal food assistance benefits. Lawrence slept on the sidewalk in several winter coats as it rained while he collected nearly $1,600 plus "boxes and boxes" of food for the food banks. In total, his campaign has collected more than 5,000 meals for families in the district through the Greater Lansing Food Bank. Barrett's staff called the police on him.

Lawrence held a fundraiser for medical debt relief that canceled $100,000 in outstanding medical debt for local residents.

At a March 2026 No Kings protest, Lawrence addressed the crowd and stated that because President Trump was never held accountable for his role in the January 6 attacks, he was more emboldened during his second term. He advocated that Trump should be impeached, prosecuted, and barred from public office.

In July 2026, comments from a 2024 podcast in which Lawrence described "the older generation of Black political leadership" as "a pillar, frankly, for establishment, capitalist, imperialist American power" and said that their role "really defangs the white left," received criticism. Lawrence said his remarks were "taken out of context," and added, "The way I made this point was clumsy, and I regret my choice of words."

On August 4, 2026, Lawrence won the Democratic primary election, defeating Ambassador Bridget Brink and former Navy SEAL Matt Maasdam.

Lawrence's expunged 2013 conviction became an issue in the general election campaign. He had discussed the arrest publicly in an Instagram video, in which he said of the protest, "Was it righteous? Absolutely. Was it wise? Perhaps not," acknowledged that the protesters had failed to stop the pipeline, and said he would not advise others to do what he did. His campaign described the guilty plea as a practical decision to resolve the case. In August 2026, Barrett criticized Lawrence over the protest, and the National Republican Congressional Committee labeled him a felon. Lawrence responded, "I stand by the righteousness of that action," adding that he was proud to have taken part while conceding that the action may not have been the wisest course. He said he had acted to prevent another spill like the one in 2010 and accused Barrett and his allies of trying to distract from the conduct of the Trump administration.

On November 4, 2026, Lawrence defeated Barrett with 51 percent to Barrett's 48 percent. While Lawrence carried only two of the district's seven counties, he swamped Barrett in Ingham County, home to Lansing, by 48,700 votes, far more than his overall margin of 13,100 votes.

== Political positions ==
Lawrence said the 2003 Iraq war, which started when he was 13, was a "formative political experience of my life."

Lawrence has said he would invest in affordable housing, quality health care, elder care, and child care. He has also sharply criticized the United States' involvement in the 2026 Iran war, support for Israel in the Gaza war and the Gaza genocide. He is an advocate for Medicare for All and a Green New Deal, as well as creating more public housing. He has spoken out against the construction of a new ICE detention processing center in Romulus, Michigan, and ICE administrative offices in Southfield, Michigan.

Lawrence has criticized the growing push to bring large data centers to Michigan.

In September 2026, CNN's KFile reported that Lawrence had deleted hundreds of posts made under a previous Twitter account, largely between 2020 and 2022. In the posts, he expressed support for police and prison abolition and "free and open migration", called for nationalizing fossil-fuel companies to wind down production, and advocated abolishing the U.S. Senate and a "fundamental overhaul" of the Constitution. In 2022 he described the nuclear-family home as an "isolating, individualistic, violent way of organizing society". In December 2021, in song lyrics he posted about Senator Joe Manchin's opposition to Democrats' climate agenda, he wrote, "Our generation says fuck you for everything. Hurry up and die so that we can get started." Other posts attacked moderate Democrats: he called then-Rep. Abigail Spanberger's criticism of "defund the police" a "tantrum", wrote that it was "time for the Dem civil war to rage", said it was "better to be a minority party that stands for something than a majority party that can't govern", and in 2020 wrote that he was "ashamed to be represented" by then-Rep. Elissa Slotkin. Lawrence responded that he had "done my fair share of thinking out loud on the internet", that he disagreed with some of his earlier posts, that he did not support defunding the police or open borders, and that he regretted his comment about Slotkin.

== Personal life ==
Lawrence lives in Lansing with his wife Dinah. He is a member of the Working Families Party. Lawrence was a member of the Democratic Socialists of America until July 2026.

== See also ==
- Progressivism in the United States

U.S. House of Representatives
Preceded by Tom Barrett	Member of the U.S. House of Representatives from Michigan's 7th congressional district Taking office 2027	Elect
