= Sara Blazevic =

American activist (born 1992 or 1993)

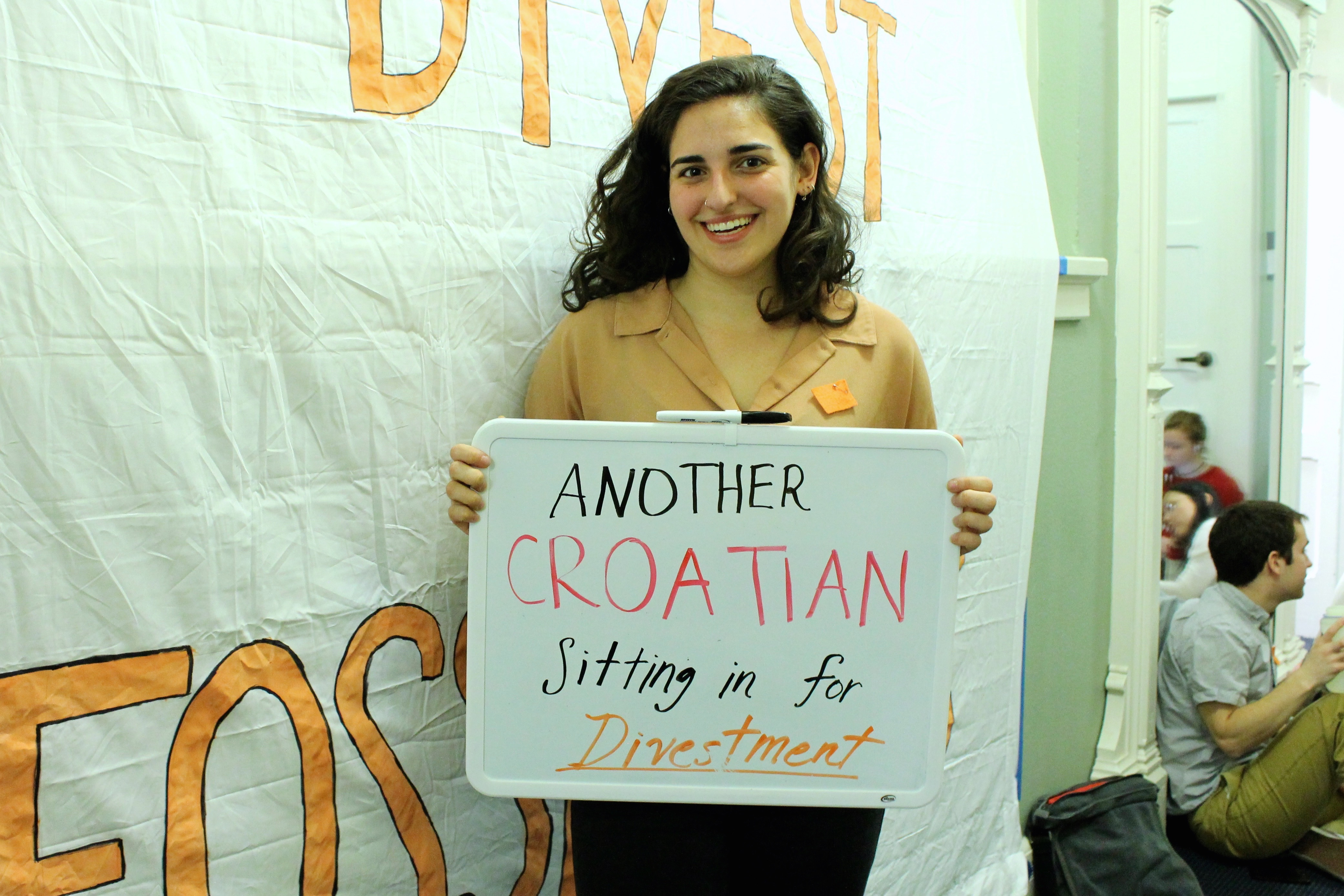
- Blazevic in 2015
- Born: 1992 or 1993 (age 33); Manhattan, New York, U.S.
- Education: Swarthmore College
- Movement: Progressive, Environmental justice

Sara Blazevic (born 1992 or 1993) is an American activist best known for co-founding the Sunrise Movement, an organization that advocates political action on climate change.

== Early life ==
Sara Blazevic grew up in Manhattan in New York City in a family of Croatian descent. When she was 16, she went on a volunteer trip to New Orleans in the aftermath of Hurricane Katrina, an experience that was a "personal awakening" about climate change.

== Career ==
=== Campus climate organizing ===
Blazeric attended Swarthmore College, where she began working as a campus strategy coordinator of the Fossil Fuel Divestment Student Network, an organization fighting for divestment on the national level. Her chapter was trying to get the college to divest from the 200 largest fossil fuel companies, and pressured leadership by organizing a sit-in outside the office of the vice president of finance with more than 100 students that lasted over three weeks. Nearly two-thirds of the students signed a petition in support on divestment.

Her involvement in that group is also where she met Varshini Prakash, who would later become another one of the co-founders of Sunrise Movement. Blazevic graduated from Swarthmore in 2015 with a degree in comparative literature and began working on Bernie Sanders 2016 presidential campaign soon after.

The group of activists who would eventually go on to found the Sunrise Movement met at a 2015 march to the White House. In the summer of 2016, Blazevic and about a dozen others trained at Momentum, an organization that teaches community organizing.

=== Sunrise Movement ===
In 2015, Blazevic co-founded Sunrise Movement with William Lawrence, Guido Girgenti, Victoria Fernandez, and Varshini Prakash. When the organization officially launched in 2017, their goal was to be a more confrontational environmental movement and utilize civil disobedience and protest to effect political change. The group has pointed to historic movements like Act Up, the anti-apartheid movement, and the anti-nuclear movement as inspiration. The group also organized to elect politicians who would be strong supporters of renewable energy in the 2018 midterm elections, both in the Democratic primaries and the general election. Their goals on climate policy developed into the environmental program known as the Green New Deal. Blazevic acted as the organization's managing director, and by 2021 had become training director.

In 2018, together with Justice Democrats and Alexandria Ocasio-Cortez, Blazevic and a group of other Sunrise members organized a sit-in in the office of Speaker of the House Nancy Pelosi. Blazevic told the crowd "We thought they owed us more than lip service on the biggest issue facing our generation." She was also responsible for ensuring that no one under 18 got arrested. Sunrise organized a similar event in February 2019, bringing a group of young people to confront Senator Dianne Feinstein in her office.

By November 2019, Inside Philanthropy reported that the group had grown to 1,140 monthly donors, and had 90 volunteer hubs pop up in six weeks, across 33 states.

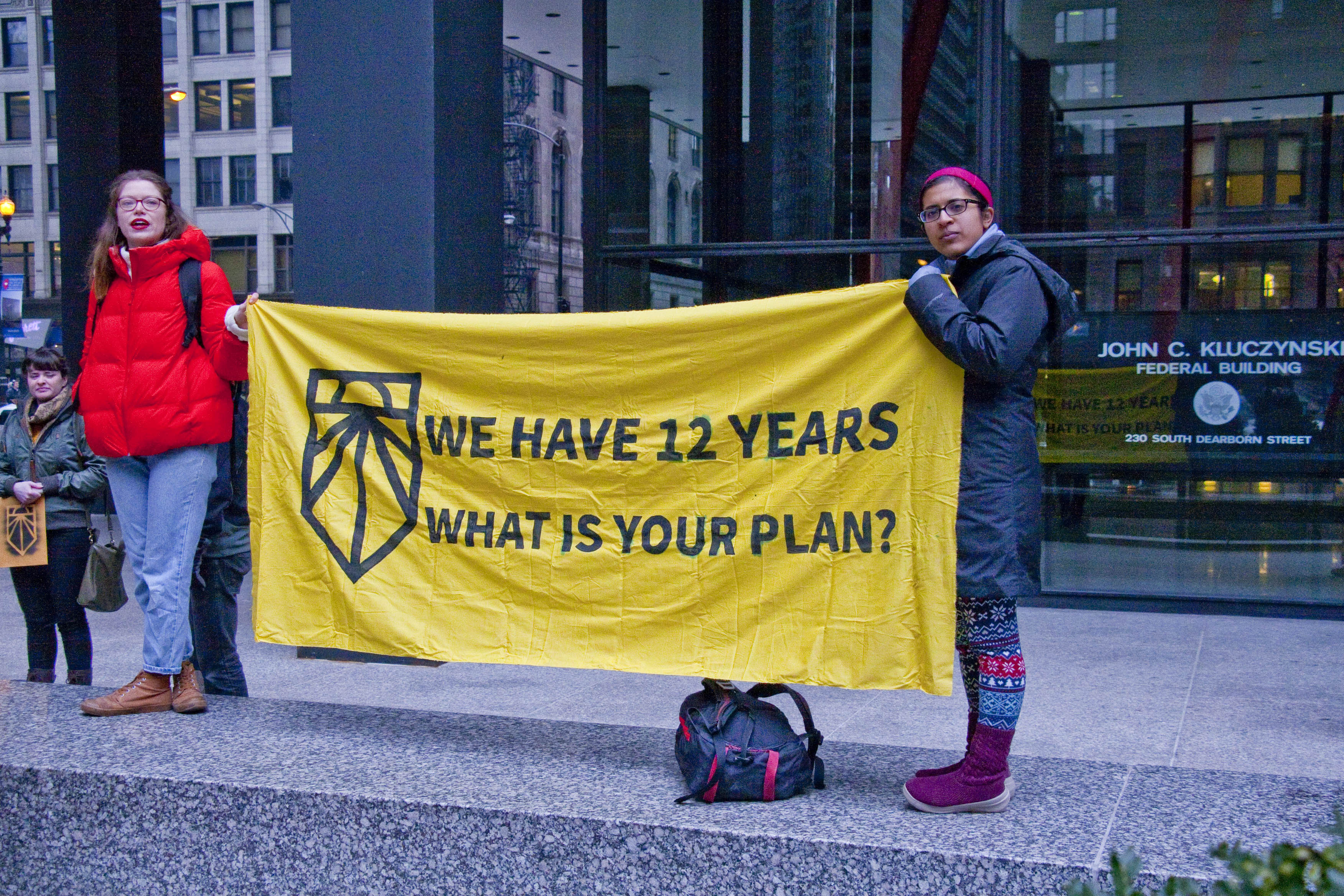
Members of the Sunrise Movement hold a banner that says "We have 12 years, what is your plan?" (2019)

In 2021, Blazevic and Prakash were named by Fortune as number 28 on their list of the "World's 50 Greatest Leaders."

=== 2025 New York City mayoral election ===
Blazevic supported Zohran Mamdani in his successful 2025 campaign for Mayor of New York. After the election, she became part of Our Time for NYC, a nonprofit political group formed by members of the New York City Democratic Socialists of America to maintain the organizing energy among those who might be apprehensive about joining DSA. She was the group's organizing director until mid-2026 when nearly all of its staff left because NYC-DSA had nearly tripled in size. As Emma Saltzberg, a member of Our Time's board, said, "It turns out that democratic socialism is more popular than we thought it was."

== Personal life ==
As of 2021, Blazevic lived in the Flatbush neighborhood of Brooklyn with her boyfriend Guido Girgenti.

== See also ==
- Sunrise Movement
- Green New Deal
- Progressivism in the United States
