= The Hand That Feeds (film) =

- Directed by: Robin Blotnick; Rachel Lears
- Screenplay by: Robin Blotnick; Rachel Lears
- Produced by: Alex Rivera; Patricia Benabe
- Starring: Virgilio Aran; Benjamin Dictor; Diego Ibeanez
- Cinematography: Rachel Lears
- Edited by: Robin Blotnick; David Meneses
- Music by: Ryan Blotnick
- Production company: Jubilee Films
- Release date: April 5, 2014
- Running time: 84 minutes
- Country: United States

The Hand That Feeds is a 2014 American documentary film written and directed by Robin Blotnick and Rachel Lears. It chronicles the struggles of undocumented immigrant workers in New York City as they attempt to achieve fair wages and better working conditions.

The film premiered at the Full Frame Documentary Film Festival in April 2014, and has received multiple awards, including a nomination for the 2017 Outstanding Business and Economic Documentary Emmy.

== Plot summary ==
The film focuses on a group of undocumented immigrants who prepare and serve food and coffee to residents of New York City's Upper East Side. The bakery café at which they work, 63rd Street Hot & Crusty, appears from the outside to be a fair and efficient business; however, the film reveals a situation in which workers face sub-legal wages, dangerous machinery, and abusive managers who will fire them for calling in sick. In January 2012, led by sandwich maker Mahoma Lopez, the group unionized in an attempt to get their voice heard and achieve fair working conditions.

With the assistance of a number of inspired organizers from the Occupy Wall Street movement, the workers risk deportation and the loss of their livelihood as they embark on a year-long battle for a living wage against reluctant New York investors. Their plight is complicated when their complaint to the New York State Department of Labor is ignored, as well as their requests to join larger unions on the grounds that their restaurant is too small. Their case is fought in court and on the streets as they endeavour to promote a greater recognition of undocumented workers within the United States' economy and the injustices they face.

== Cast ==
- Virgilio Arán
- Benjamin Dictor
- Diego Ibanez
- Gonzalo Jimenez
- Elizabeth Lopez
- Mahoma Lopez
- Margarito Lopez
- Nastraran Mohit
- Diana Ortiz
- Rosanna Rodriguez
- Felicito Tapia

== Production ==
The film was produced by Blotnick and Lears' own production company Jubilee Films, in association with Latino Public Broadcasting, Chicken & Egg Pictures, and Vineyard Point Productions. It was shot on location in New York City.

== Release ==
The film debuted in April 2014 at the 22nd Annual Full Frame Documentary Film Festival held in Durham, North Carolina, where it won the Audience Award for Best Feature.

In June 2016 it aired as an episode of America ReFramed on the World Channel.

== Reception ==
=== Critical response ===
The Hand That Feeds Us has a 93% rating on Rotten Tomatoes based on 15 reviews. On Metacritic, the film has a weighted average score of 63 based on 7 reviews, indicating "generally favorable reviews".

Ben Kenisberg of The New York Times, complimented Robin Blotnick and Rachel Lears' ability to illuminate an important political issue, lauding the film as "an effective portrayal of the intricacies of activism – and of a situation in which victories seem all too brief." Peter Keough of The Boston Globe commends the positive motivation for the film and the intelligent delivery of its message, claiming it to be "socially conscious documentary film-making at its best." Diana Clark of The Village Voice applauded the documentary’s entertainment value, writing that it was "filmed with the urgency and suspense of a Hitchcock thriller."

Despite the majority of critical reviews praising both the political message of the film and the technical prowess of its makers, it has induced some more negative responses. Such reviews predominately have issue with the imbalance of opinions represented in the film. Martin Tsai for the Los Angeles Times articulates this concern saying that "when the employer declined an interview, the filmmakers could have - but apparently didn’t - reach out to unaffiliated legal or labor experts for comment. Instead, we got lots of blurred-out signs, unnamed parties, first-name-only interviewees, pointless establishing shots and a manipulative score." Further, he believes the film "barely substantiates the hardships of workers and does not put their quality of life into any kind of statistical perspective."

=== Accolades ===
- Full Frame Documentary Film Festival (2014) - Audience Award for Best Feature (Won)
- DOC NYC (2014) - SundanceNow Doc Club Audience Award (Won)
- DOC NYC (2014) - Metropolis Grand Jury Prize (Nominated)
- Sidewalk Film Festival (2014) - Best Documentary Feature (Won)
- Cleveland International Film Festival (2015) - Greg Gund Memorial Standing Up Award (Nominated)
- News and Documentary Emmy Awards (2017) - Outstanding Business and Economic Documentary (Nominated)

== Changing The Food Chain ==
Changing The Food Chain is a collaboration between Food Chain Workers Alliance and The Hand That Feeds. An online interactive map aims to facilitate community engagement with organizations that support workers in the American food industry.

Organizations within Changing The Food Chain are divided into four different categories.

- Work Centers: Organizations that provide assistance to low-wage, often immigrant workers who are not represented by a union or similar advocacy bodies or those who are not subject to labor laws.
- Advocacy Groups: Any group seeking to promote the agendas of the public in order to affect policy change at the local, state and national level.
- Service Organizations: Organisations that provide services such as legal assistance, education or real estate agency.
- Unions: Organizations that are legally recognized to equip groups of workers with collective bargaining powers when disputing issues regarding working conditions, wages and contract violations.

Changing The Food Chain advises those that are interested in contributing to the cause to find an organization near them, learn more about local issues, learn their rights, organize their workplace, become a community supporter, advocate for change, and actualize the movement.
