= United States House Select Committee on the Climate Crisis =

Congressional committee (2019–2023)

Select Committee on the Climate Crisis
Select committee
- Defunct United States House of Representatives

History
- Formed: 2019
- Disbanded: January 3, 2023

Leadership
- Chair: Kathy Castor (D)
- Vice Chair: Garret Graves (R)

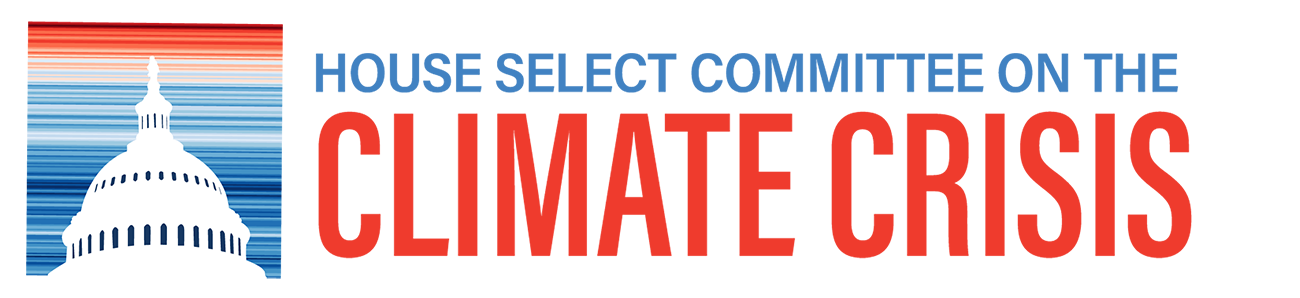
The committee's logo, showing a silhouette of the Capitol dome before a warming stripes graphic depicting annual global temperature rise

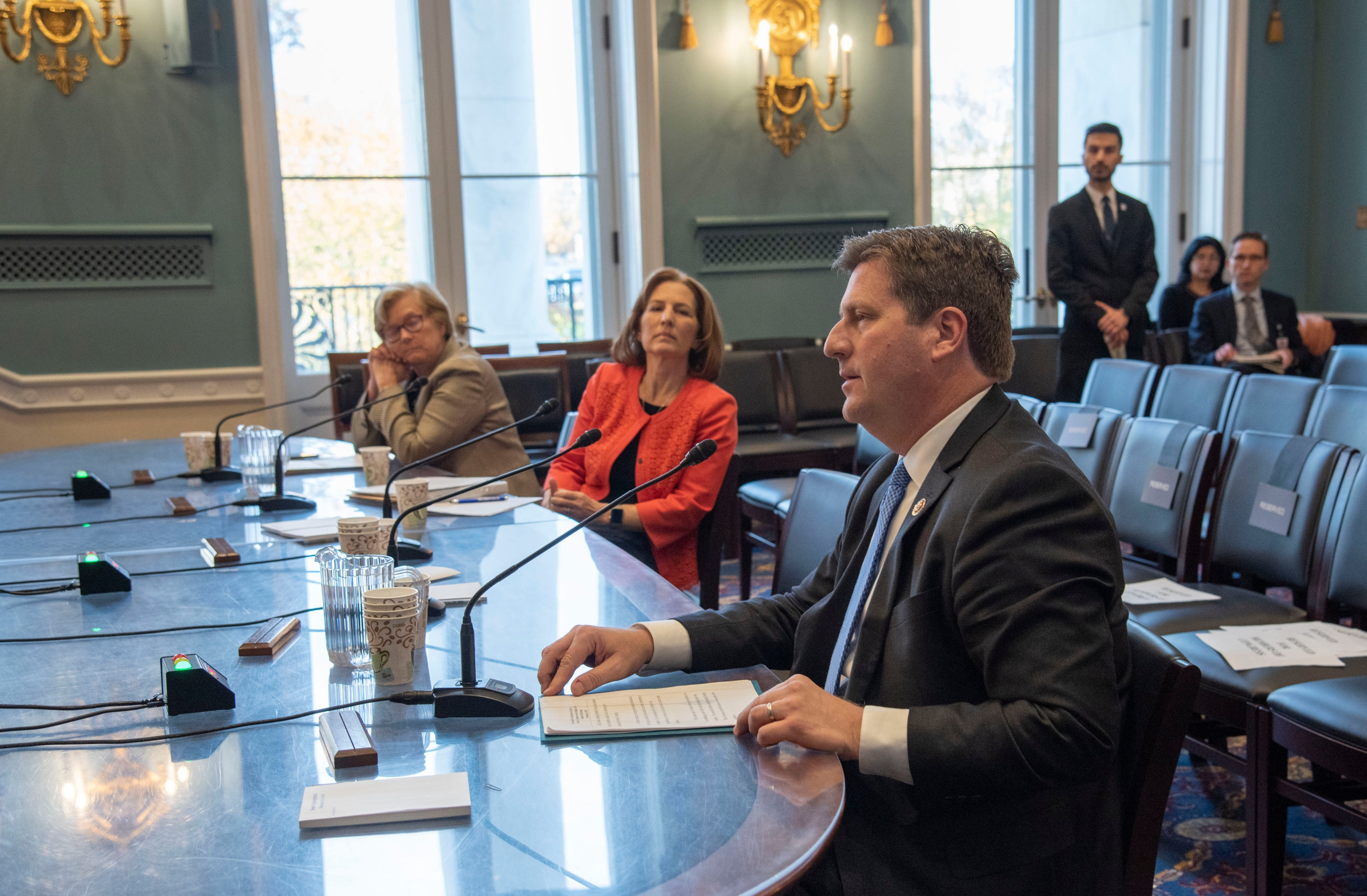
Greg Stanton speaking to the Committee about climate change in 2019

The House Select Committee on the Climate Crisis was a select committee established in the 116th United States Congress in 2019 when Democrats regained a majority in the United States House of Representatives. Its chair was Congresswoman Kathy Castor of Florida. The committee had no mandate or subpoena power to compel witnesses to testify.

Its predecessor was the United States House Select Committee on Energy Independence and Global Warming, which existed from 2007 to 2011, and was not renewed when Republicans gained control of the House for the 112th Congress.

Nancy Pelosi, in her role as House Minority Leader, called for the Select Committee a week prior to the 2018 House elections, telling The New York Times she wanted it to "prepare the way with evidence" for legislation to mitigate climate change. In November and December 2018, youth climate activists with the Sunrise Movement pushed House Democrats to form a select committee with the mandate to draft "Green New Deal" legislation, working with incoming freshman Rep. Alexandria Ocasio-Cortez, who proposed language for the committee's authorization. The activists staged a series of sit-ins in the offices of Nancy Pelosi, Steny Hoyer, and Jim McGovern, the incoming Speaker, Majority Leader, and Rules Committee chair. About two dozen Democratic members of Congress supported their proposal, but the incoming chairs of the Energy & Commerce and Natural Resources Committees, Reps. Frank Pallone and Raúl Grijalva, opposed it.

The committee held its first field hearing on August 1, 2019, at the University of Colorado Boulder. The witnesses started with Colorado governor Jared Polis, followed by a panel that included the mayors of Boulder and Fort Collins, an expert in rural agricultural energy issues from Colorado State University, a representative of the oil and gas industry, and the director of the university's chief sustainability officer.

Following the November 2022 elections, the Republican Party obtained a majority in the House of Representatives. Garret Graves, the committee's ranking Republican, expressed an intent to end the committee. On December 14, 2022, the committee released its final report. The committee ceased to exist at the beginning of the 118th Congress on January 3, 2023.

== Historical committee rosters ==
=== 116th Congress ===
Majority	Minority
Kathy Castor, Florida, Chair; Ben Ray Luján, New Mexico; Suzanne Bonamici, Oregon; Julia Brownley, California; Sean Casten, Illinois; Jared Huffman, California; Mike Levin, California; Donald McEachin, Virginia; Joe Neguse, Colorado	Garret Graves, Louisiana, Ranking Member; Gary Palmer, Alabama; Morgan Griffith, Virginia; Kelly Armstrong, North Dakota; Carol Miller, West Virginia; Buddy Carter, Georgia

=== 117th Congress ===
Majority	Minority
Kathy Castor, Florida, Chair; Suzanne Bonamici, Oregon; Julia Brownley, California; Jared Huffman, California; Mike Levin, California; Sean Casten, Illinois; Joe Neguse, Colorado; Veronica Escobar, Texas; Donald McEachin, Virginia (Note: Served until his death on November 28, 2022.)	Garret Graves, Louisiana, Ranking Member; Gary Palmer, Alabama; Buddy Carter, Georgia; Carol Miller, West Virginia; Kelly Armstrong, North Dakota; Dan Crenshaw, Texas; Anthony Gonzalez, Ohio

== See also ==
- Climate change policy of the United States
- Climate crisis
- Effects of climate change
- Efficient energy use
- Climate change
- Energy resilience
- Climate Change Science Program
