= Alexandra Rojas =

American political activist

- Born: February 25, 1995 (age 31); East Hartford, Connecticut, U.S.
- Education: Orange Coast College
- Political party: Democratic

Alexandra Rojas (born February 25, 1995) is an American activist and political commentator who is the executive director of Justice Democrats. She has provided political commentary on CNN.

== Education ==
Between 2009 and 2013, Alexandra Rojas attended Glastonbury High School in Glastonbury, Connecticut. She went to Orange Coast College in Orange County, California, from 2014 to 2016 to study political science and economics. While at college, she was actively involved in campus politics and became the Students Senate President in 2015. In 2016, she received a degree in political science and economics.

== Political activism ==
After joining Bernie Sanders' 2016 campaign as an intern, she served as digital field manager from January 2016 to June 2016 and helped run the volunteer-led "barnstorm" program.

After the campaign ended, she became one of the founders of Brand New Congress, working on candidate recruitment. Justice Democrats split from Brand New Congress to focus on running Democratic candidates and launching progressive primary challenges against long-time Democratic incumbents. Rojas became the group's executive director in May 2018, taking over from Saikat Chakrabarti who went on to become chief of staff for Alexandria Ocasio-Cortez in Congress.

Rojas appeared in Rachel Lears' 2022 documentary film, To the End, which focuses on the effects of climate change. The film debuted at the 2022 Sundance Film Festival and was presented at the Tribeca Film Festival in June 2022.

== Accolades ==
In 2019, Rojas was placed on Time's Top 100 Next List for her work with Justice Democrats.
