= Varshini Prakash =

American climate activist

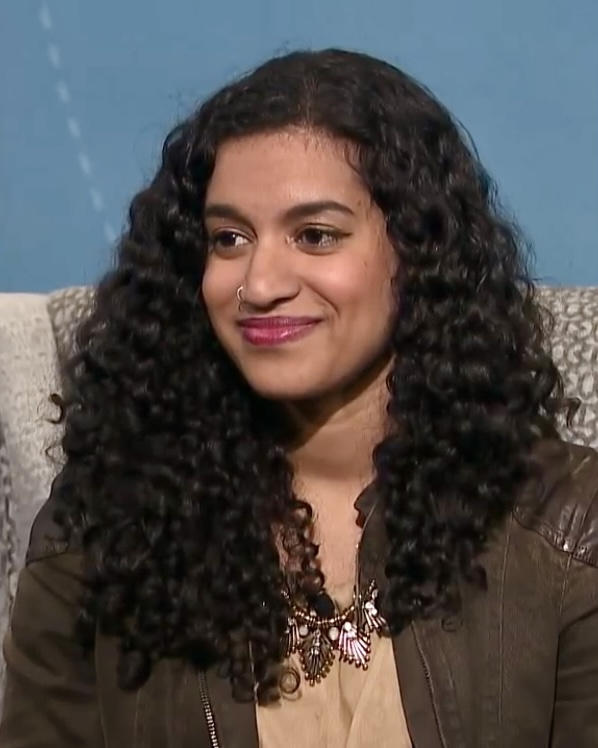
- Born: 1992 or 1993 (age 32–33); Massachusetts, U.S.
- Education: University of Massachusetts, Amherst (BA)
- Known for: Former executive director and co-founder of the Sunrise Movement
- Political party: Democratic

Varshini Prakash (born 1992/1993) is an American climate activist. She co-founded the Sunrise Movement in 2017, serving as its executive director until 2023. She was named on the 2019 Time 100 Next list, and was a co-recipient of the Sierra Club John Muir Award in 2019.

== Early life and education ==
Prakash was born to and raised in Massachusetts by parents from Southern India; her father was from Tamil Nadu. She first became aware of climate change when she was 11 while watching news coverage of the 2004 Indian Ocean tsunami which impacted Chennai, where her grandparents lived. Growing up, she wanted to become a doctor.

Prakash went to college at the University of Massachusetts Amherst where she began organizing around climate issues. In late 2015, devastating floods in South India seized her attention, having caused flooding up to the level of her grandparents' apartment in Chennai. To help combat climate change, Prakash became a leader of the school's fossil fuel divestment campaign. Prakash also worked with a national organization, Fossil Fuel Divestment Student Network. In 2016, a year after she graduated, UMass Amherst became the first large, public university to divest.

== Career ==
In 2017, Prakash launched the Sunrise Movement, an American youth-led political movement and 501(c)(4) that advocates political action on climate change, with seven other co-founders. Those other founders include Sara Blazevic, Victoria Fernandez, Guido Girgenti, and William Lawrence

In 2018, she became the Sunrise Movement's executive director after the group organized a protest occupying U.S. House Speaker Nancy Pelosi's office asking that a congressional task force be established to address climate change.

As part of her work with the Sunrise Movement, Prakash advocated for proposals like the Green New Deal. In 2020, the organization endorsed U.S. senator Bernie Sanders in the Democratic Primary for the presidency. Prakash was named as an adviser to Joe Biden's climate task force in 2020. She is also an advisory board member of Climate Power 2020, a group that includes Democrats and activists advocating for increasing the interest American voters take in climate action.

Prakash edited the book written by Girgenti, Winning the Green New Deal: Why We Must, How We Can, released August 2020. She also is a contributor to The New Possible: Visions of Our World Beyond Crisis. Prakash appeared in Rachel Lears' 2022 documentary film, To the End, which focuses on the effects of climate change. The film debuted at the 2022 Sundance Film Festival and was presented at the Tribeca Film Festival in June 2022.

In September 2023, Prakash stepped down as Sunrise executive director, succeeded by Sunrise activist Aru Shiney-Ajay.

== Recognition ==
Prakash was named on the 2019 Time 100 Next list of emerging global leaders. She was a finalist for the 2019 Pritzker Emerging Environmental Genius Award from the University of California, Los Angeles. She received Dickinson College's Rose-Walters Prize for Environmental Activism with a college residency in the 2021–2022 academic year.

== Bibliography ==
- Prakash, Varshini; Girgenti, Guido, eds. (August 25, 2020). Winning the Green New Deal: Why We Must, How We Can. Simon & Schuster. ISBN 198214243X.
