= Aru Shiney-Ajay =

American climate activist (born 1998)

Aru Shiney-Ajay (born 1998) is an American climate activist and the executive director of the Sunrise Movement. She succeeded Varshini Prakash in September 2023 after serving as the organization's training director.

She was born in Connecticut and grew up in Minnesota, raised in an Indian immigrant household with deep ties to the Global South. After experiencing the 2018 Kerala floods, she interrupted her studies at Swarthmore College and started working for Sunrise as its training director full-time. Since she became director the Sunrise Movement since trained 35,000 new recruits. She has a dog named Gem.

In 2026, she led Sunrise Movement organizing efforts in Minneapolis in response to expanded Immigration and Customs Enforcement (ICE) operations. The campaign included efforts to pressure hotel chains and other corporations not to provide lodging to federal agents.
