= Sunrise Movement =

American youth movement advocating political action on climate change

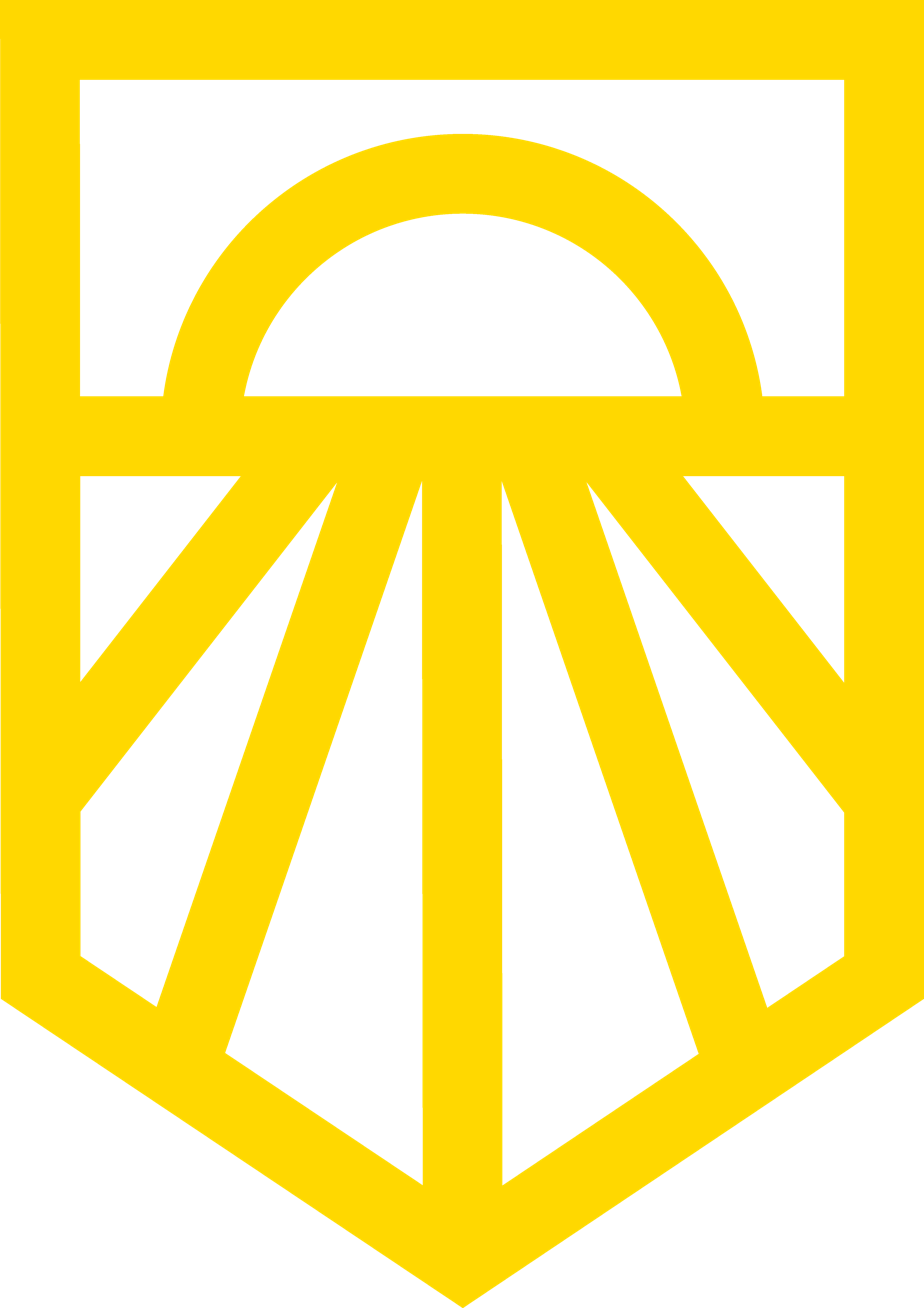
- Founded: April 2017 in Washington, D.C.
- Founders: Sara Blazevic, Victoria Fernandez, Guido Girgenti, William Lawrence, and Varshini Prakash
- Legal status: 501(c)(4), 501(c)(3)
- Headquarters: Washington, D.C.
- Region served: United States
- Method: Grassroots
- Executive Director: Aru Shiney-Ajay
- Affiliations: Progressive International
- Website: www.sunrisemovement.org

Sunrise Movement is a progressive 501(c)(4) advocating political action on climate change in the United States. When launched in 2017, the movement's goal was to elect proponents of renewable energy in the 2018 midterm elections, first in the Democratic primaries and then in the general election held on November 6, 2018. Since the midterm elections, the movement has been working towards shifting the Overton window on climate policy to center the environmental program known as the Green New Deal.

Together with Justice Democrats and Alexandria Ocasio-Cortez, the group organized a sit-in in the office of Speaker of the House Nancy Pelosi, which brought Sunrise its first significant press coverage. Sunrise organized a similar event in February 2019, bringing a group of young people to confront Senator Dianne Feinstein in her office.

Since the sit-in, the movement has been attracting media attention with their direct actions, such as the Wide Awake series of actions in the summer of 2020.

== History ==
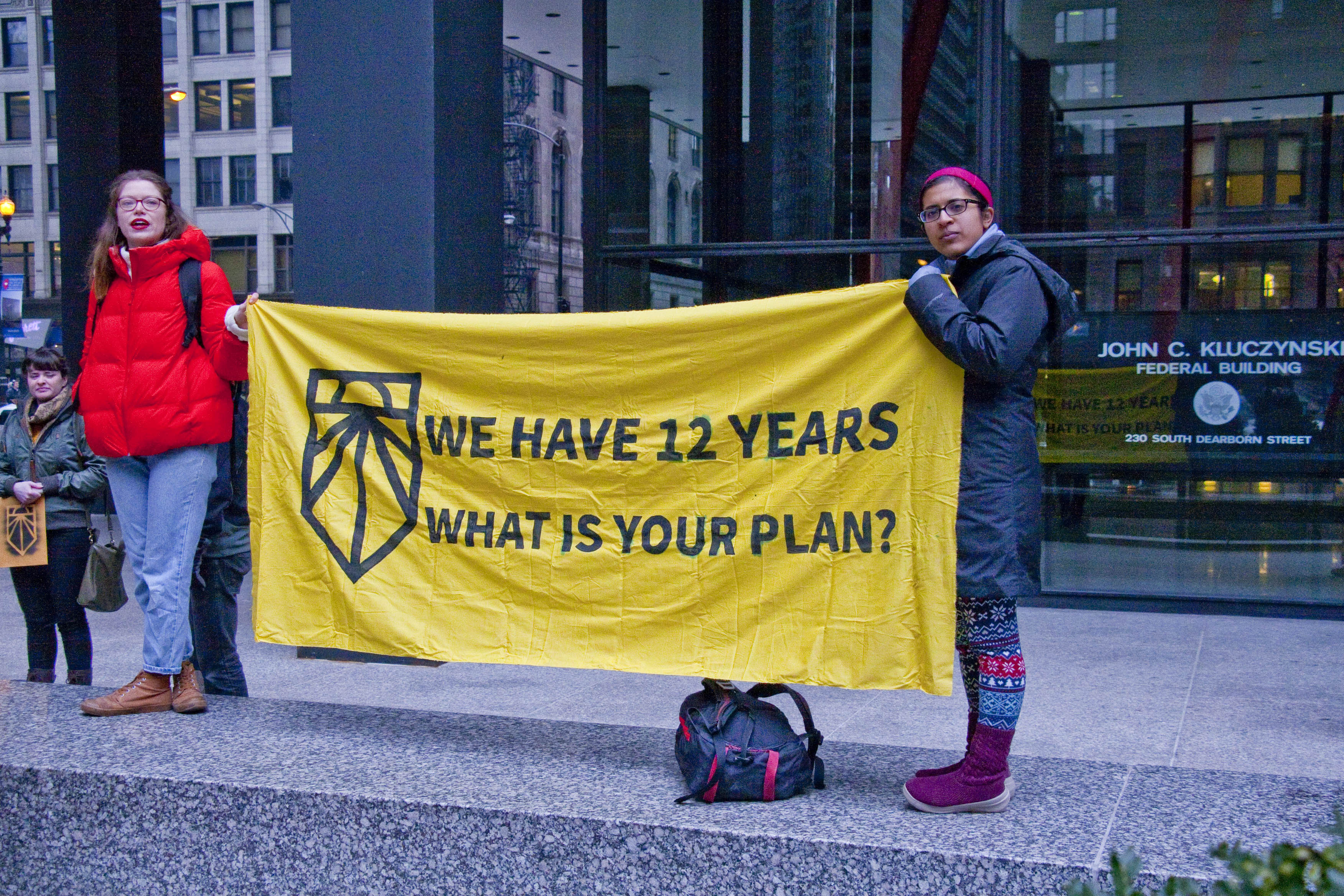
Banner "We have 12 years, what is your plan?" (2019)

In the summer of 2013, Evan Weber, Matthew Lichtash, and environmentalist Michael K. Dorsey used a $30,000 grant and free office space provided by the Sierra Club and the Wesleyan University Green Fund to draft a plan for climate action. This led to the incorporation of the US Climate Plan in January 2014.

Sara Blazevic, William Lawrence, Varshini Prakash, Victoria Fernandez, Guido Girgenti, and three others started the Sunrise Movement on the East Coast in 2015. Blazevic, Prakash, Lawrence, and other early leaders trained at Momentum, an organization that teaches community organizing.

The Sunrise Movement launched as a 501(c)(4) in 2017. During the 2018 midterms, they worked to oust candidates who would not refuse funding from the fossil fuel industry and to elect proponents of renewable energy. Half of the group's first 20 endorsements won their elections. Deb Haaland, Alexandria Ocasio-Cortez, Rashida Tlaib, and Ilhan Omar won election to the House of Representatives—and six other endorsed candidates won election to state House or Senate seats in Florida, New York, and Pennsylvania.

Since the 2018 elections, the Sunrise Movement has focused on the climate change proposals collectively known as the Green New Deal, whose core principles have been described as "decarbonization, jobs, and justice". Its proposals include a transition to renewable energy, expanded public transportation, and an economic plan to drive job growth. Several publications have reported that the Green New Deal opposes nuclear power and carbon capture as well as some other technologies. However, Senator Ed Markey, the co-sponsor of the Green New Deal resolution in the United States Senate, stated that the resolution's language is technology-agnostic and does not exclude nuclear power or carbon capture.

In March 2019, a group of activists in the UK called on the Labour Party to commit to taking radical steps to decarbonize the UK economy within a decade. Calling their movement "Labour for a Green New Deal", a group spokesperson said they got their inspiration from the Sunrise Movement and the work that Ocasio-Cortez has done in the US. Group members have met with Zack Exley, co-founder of the progressive group Justice Democrats, to learn from the experiences that he and Ocasio-Cortez have had in working for the Green New Deal campaign in the US.

In the summer of 2020, the Sunrise Movement began organizing Wide Awake actions, in which protesters show up at politicians' houses early in the morning, chanting and making a noise to wake them up.

Among controversies, the Washington, D.C., chapter of the movement was accused of antisemitism after canceling a planned appearance at a rally for democratic rights over the simultaneous appearance and participation of several prominent Jewish organizations who they claim support Israeli Zionism: "Given our commitment to racial justice, self-governance, and indigenous sovereignty, we oppose Zionism and any state that enforces its ideology," the chapter stated, while calling on the rally coalition to remove the Jewish groups with the implicit notion of D.C. chapter support afterwards. The national leadership denounced the D.C. chapter's decision as "unacceptable and antisemitic" because it singled out Jewish groups without mentioning other participating groups with similar views on Zionism and Israel.

In a Noam Chomsky interview in April 2021, Chomsky was asked what in more than 60 years of speaking he was most proud of. Mentioning the Sunrise Movement specifically, he replied: "The most gratifying thing is the work of the Sunrise Movement and many others who are carrying things forward in the face of severe difficulties, unflinching and moving forward on crucial challenges—that's gratifying."

The Sunrise Movement Education Fund, which is the Sunrise Movement's 501(c)(3) nonprofit, was recommended as a top climate-change charity by Giving Green, a nonprofit charity assessment organization, in November 2020. Giving Green removed its recommendation in November 2021 because the Sunrise Movement Education Fund had more funding than it used to and because of uncertainty about the Sunrise Movement's future plans, saying, "post-2020, Sunrise did not play a key role in crafting and pushing approval for subsequent climate bills."

In September 2025, the organization formally expanded its mission to include fighting authoritarianism of the Trump administration.

== Activities ==
=== November 2018 sit-in ===
After taking control of the House of Representatives in the 2018 midterm elections, Democrats disagreed about the best way to address climate change with legislation. Sunrise planned a sit-in in Pelosi's office and asked Representative-elect Alexandria Ocasio-Cortez to help them publicize the event, which she instead decided to join herself. The sit-in demands were that all members of the Democratic leadership in the House would refuse donations from the fossil fuel industry, and that Pelosi work to build consensus in the House over Green New Deal legislation to be passed when Democrats regain control of government. The latter would be accomplished by a "Committee on a Green New Deal". The sit-in took place on November 13. Over 250 protesters showed up to occupy Pelosi's office, with 51 being arrested by Capitol Police. Representative Rashida Tlaib voiced support for the protest over social media. Speaker Pelosi responded by welcoming the protest over Twitter, offering to reinstate the Committee on the Climate Crisis and noting that the already-promised infrastructure bill could address many of the Sunrise Movement's concerns.

=== Green New Deal Committee ===
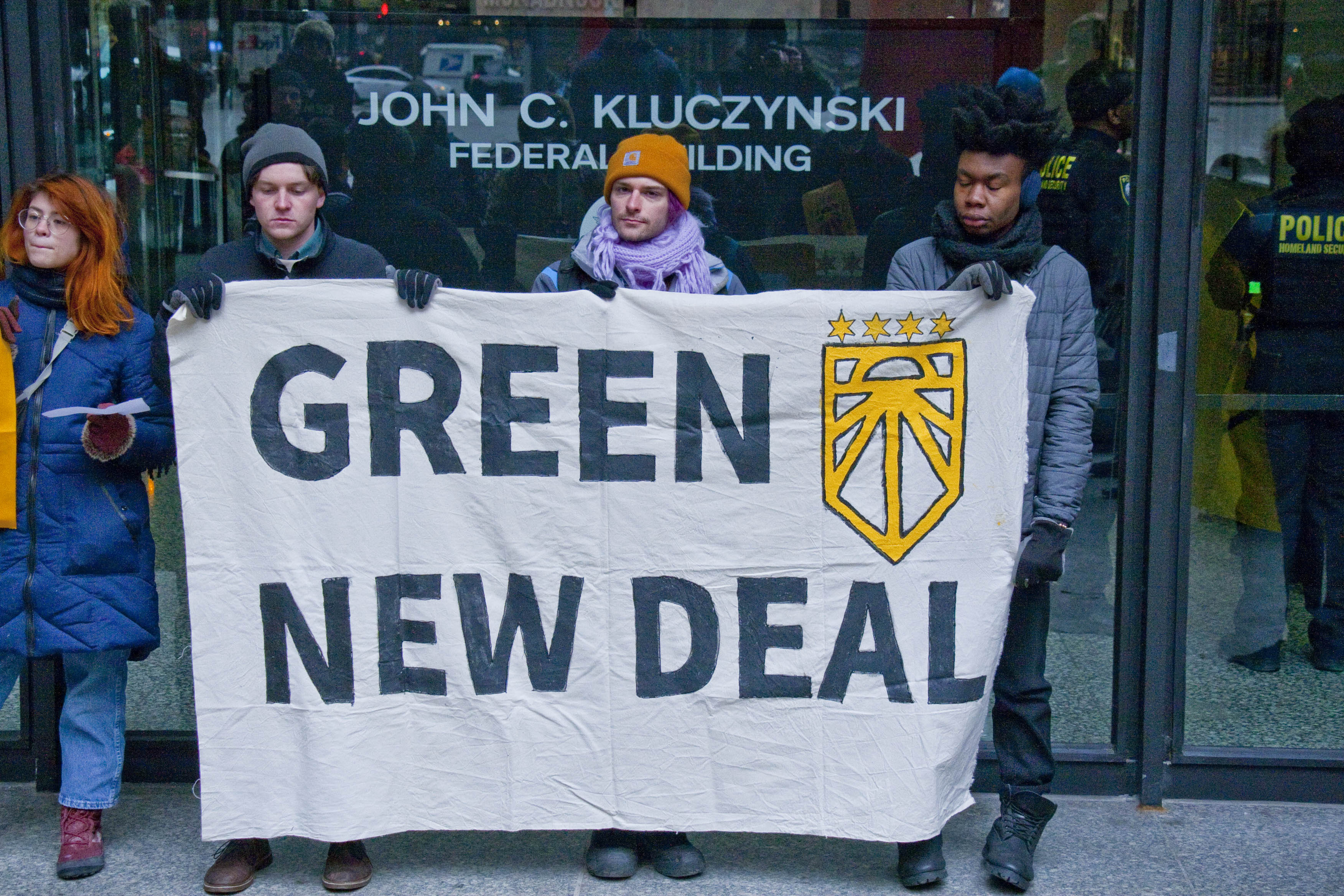
Rallies in Chicago for a Green New Deal (2019)

One major goal has been to create a select committee on the Green New Deal, a plan opposed by some in the Democratic House leadership.

The Sunrise Movement continued to campaign for House members to sign onto the plan to create a select committee for the Green New Deal, as opposed to simply resurrecting the old committee. On December 10, they staged a second sit-in at the offices of Nancy Pelosi and Jim McGovern. Over 1000 protesters showed up. By December 19, 40 members of Congress had signed on to support the creation of the committee.

Instead, Speaker Pelosi and Majority Leader Steny Hoyer decided to recreate the Committee on the Climate Crisis, appointing Representative Kathy Castor as chair.

=== Meeting with Senator Feinstein ===
In February 2019, several San Francisco Bay Area children along with their adult sponsors met with Senator Dianne Feinstein to urge her to vote to support Green New Deal legislation. Feinstein told the children that she was working on an alternative bill and that she could not support the proposed legislation, which she believed was "unworkable" and had no chance of passing the Republican-controlled Senate. However she allowed that she might vote for it as a symbolic gesture. The Sunrise Movement shared a video of the interaction, shortened so that it "focused on clips of the most tense moments" via social media and on its website. The shortened version has been viewed more than three million times. Sunrise also later posted the longer, unedited video on Facebook, resulting in controversy over whether the short version emphasized scenes intended to make Feinstein appear less sympathetic to the viewer. Senator Feinstein characterized the discussion as "spirited", whilst the executive director of the Sunrise movement said that Feinstein's treatment of the children was evidence that the Democratic Party required "fundamental change".

=== Road to a Green New Deal Tour ===
In April 2019, the Sunrise Movement held their Road to a Green New Deal Tour. The tour was intended to garner support for the Green New Deal resolution, introduced in Congress by Representative Alexandria Ocasio-Cortez and Senator Ed Markey in February 2019. The tour spanned 8 cities and over 200 town halls, featuring local politicians, activists, and leading figures in the climate movement speaking about the importance of a Green New Deal and how to achieve it. The Road to a Green New Deal Tour kicked off in Boston with the lineup of speakers including Senator Ed Markey, Representative Ayanna Pressley, Sunrise co-founder Varshini Prakash, Reverend Mariama White-Hammond, and more leaders from the community speaking at the Strand Theater in Dorchester. It concluded in Washington, D.C., at Howard University. Speakers included Senator Bernie Sanders, Representative Alexandria Ocasio-Cortez, journalist Naomi Klein, and Justice Democrats co-founder Alex Rojas.

=== Climate change debate campaign ===
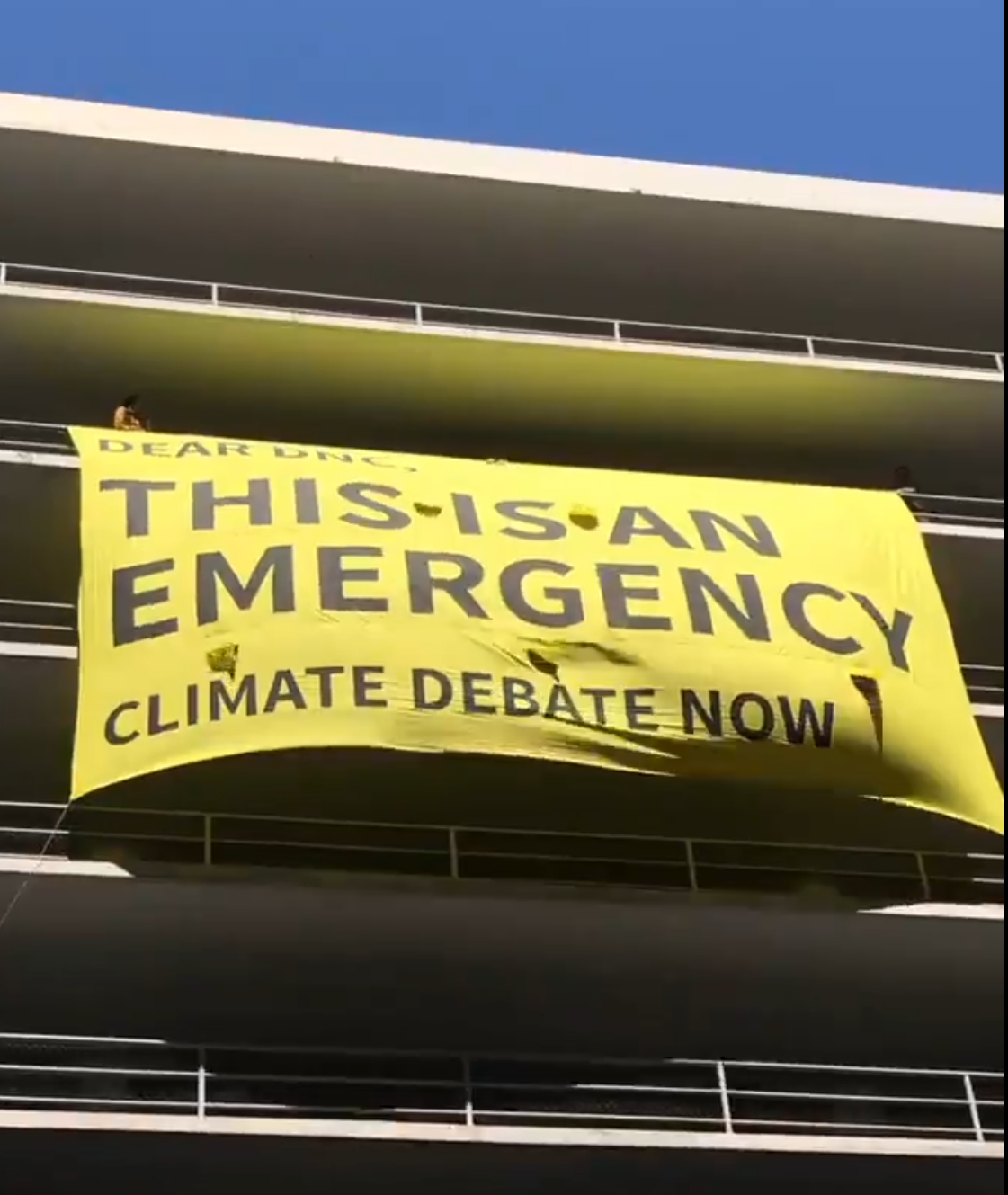
Sunrise Movement banner dropped in front of a DNC meeting (2019)

In early 2019, the Sunrise Movement defined one of its major goals as pressuring the Democratic National Committee (DNC) to hold a single-issue presidential debate on climate change. The DNC currently bars candidates from participating in outside debates (defined as multiple candidates on stage interacting with each other) but has no policy regarding participation in outside forums and town halls.

On June 26, 2019, Sunrise Movement activists slept on the steps of the DNC office in Washington, D.C., to protest the lack of focus of the Democratic primary debates on the climate crisis, and to call for a focused debate on climate change. On July 25, CNN and MSNBC announced they would be hosting a climate change Town Hall and Forum, respectively. On August 22, the DNC Resolutions Committee voted 8–17 against hosting a DNC presidential climate change debate. During the session, a resolution was passed to allow multiple candidates to appear on a stage together at a climate change town hall or forum. However, in the breakout session on August 24, the resolution was voted down 222–137, with the DNC chair voting no.

=== Wide Awake campaign ===
In the summer of 2020, the Sunrise Movement began performing Wide Awake demonstrations, in which a group of protestors would gather outside a politician's house and make noise early in the morning. The movement was inspired by the 1860 Wide Awakes, and is in protest of issues including police brutality and climate change. Politicians who have been "woken up" during these demonstrations include Mitch McConnell, Ted Cruz, Larry Hogan, Bill Barr, and Betsy DeVos.

=== Climate Mandate campaign ===
In late 2020, the Sunrise Movement began their Climate Mandate campaign by putting pressure on Joe Biden to pick a "climate cabinet" that would work towards Sunrise's goals such as the Green New Deal, and pushing for Biden to establish the "Office of Climate Mobilization".

=== 2025 DNC chair selection ===
In mid-January 2025, two months after the Democrats' loss to the Republicans, and with the imminent control of a second Trump administration, Sunrise launched a campaign - "People, Not Billionaires" - calling on upcoming Democratic National Committee (DNC) 2025 chair election candidates to pledge to "revive the Obama-era ban on corporate lobbyist donations to the DNC and to ban super PAC spending in Democratic primaries."

=== Protests against ICE ===
During Operation Metro Surge, a federal immigration enforcement operation in the Twin Cities region that killed two, the Sunrise Movement were involved in protests against the operation. The group held protest trainings and led noise protests targeting hotels that hosted ICE agents.

In response to the protests, the Department of Homeland Security launched Operation Puppet Master and Project Whipple Shield, two surveillance operations targeting progressive organizations, labor unions, and other groups opposed to Operation Metro Surge, including the Sunrise Movement. Undercover agents attended Sunrise Movement protest trainings and infiltrated protest group chats, attempting to entice people into discussing or committing crimes. In March 2026, ICE filed subpoenas to the Federal Reserve Bank of New York and the Clearing House for the organization's financial records.

== Organizational structure ==
=== Local work ===
The Sunrise Movement is organized into decentralized "hubs" that operate in cities and towns across the United States. While the National organization is the main public-facing front of the organization, there are over 400 hubs spread over all 50 states that conduct their own actions, endorsements, and more. Hubs typically follow the campaigns set by the National team, such as the Wide Awake actions conducted over the summer of 2020, but also have the authority to decide their own structure and actions. This falls in line with Sunrise Principle 7: We Take Initiative, which states that any group of 3 can take action in the name of Sunrise. In the past, hub actions have included participating in climate strikes, making their own endorsements, and staging direct actions.

==== Work at universities ====
The connection between the Sunrise Movement and universities predates its formal establishment. Early members, including the first executive director, Varshini Prakash, were leaders in the fossil fuel divestment campaign at University of Massachusetts Amherst in 2015. Today, the university is home to a hub of the modern organization.

The Sunrise Movement at American University launched an initiative for a Green New Deal at AU. The campaign was launched during a rally on the first day of voting for the spring 2023 student government elections. The movement gathered over 500 signatures to get a GND for AU on the ballot for a campus-wide referendum. The referendum received 83% of students voting in favor of the question. Candidates for Student Body President and Vice President of American University incorporated the American University Green New Deal into their official platforms. Senators in the Undergraduate Senate have come out in large support of the deal.

The Green New Deal for AU (GND4AU) is a vision for a sustainable and thriving campus for American University. The GND4AU applies the Green New Deal framework to the American University campus and community. It would position American University to be a leader in combating the climate crisis both in its operations and in the students and research it produces. Like the Green New Deal policy, it also targets economic inequality and centers social justice values.

The Sunrise Movement at the University of Florida, in conjunction with the student club Climate Action Gator and non-profit Youth Action Fund, worked towards a similar effort to that of AU. The effort was led chiefly by Student Government Senator Meagan Lamey, a member of the Change Party representing Yulee Area, and Florida youth organizer Cameron Driggers. Lamey and Driggers co-authored a five-volume resolution calling for adoption of the Climate Action Plan 2.0, greater transparency, divestment from fossil fuels, a pledge for clean research, and a call for a just transition. It was adopted unanimously by the Student Senate on February 21.

Proponents of the effort claimed the effort was the first by a major public university. Across the five volumes, there was over 30 establishing details clauses and nearly 25 specific demands. The resolutions demands will be brought to the university's board of trustees for further enactment.

=== Movement houses ===
Members of Sunrise have created "movement houses", which are shared living spaces where activists work and live together. These houses have appeared in Philadelphia, Washington, D.C., Michigan, and more cities across the country.

== Policy positions ==
The Sunrise Movement's agenda centers on the Green New Deal, a program it summarizes as "decarbonization, jobs, and justice". Its positions emphasize a rapid shift to renewable energy, federal action on job creation, and investment in the communities most affected by pollution and climate change.

=== Green New Deal ===
Sunrise describes the Green New Deal in terms of several core pillars: moving the U.S. economy to 100 percent clean energy, investing in racial and economic justice, and guaranteeing well-paid jobs through the transition. In a 2019 interview, co-founder Varshini Prakash framed the program around three goals: reaching 100 percent clean energy by 2030, investing in communities on the front lines of poverty and pollution, and guaranteeing a quality job to anyone who needs one.

=== Fossil fuels and a just transition ===
Sunrise calls for an end to the fossil fuel era, opposing the construction of new oil, gas, and coal infrastructure and seeking a transition away from fossil fuels by 2030. The group advocates a "just transition" for workers in polluting industries—including guaranteed wages and benefits for displaced fossil fuel workers—and labor protections such as project labor agreements and the expansion of worker cooperatives on Green New Deal projects. As part of its electoral strategy, Sunrise has pressed candidates, particularly Democrats, to refuse campaign contributions from the fossil fuel industry, and has worked to defeat those who decline.

=== Nuclear energy ===
The movement's stated goal is a transition to 100 percent renewable energy, and its leaders have said they see little role for building new nuclear plants. In 2019, communications director Varshini Prakash said the group did not see a pathway to bringing large numbers of new nuclear plants online given its renewable-energy target. At the same time, the movement opposes closing existing nuclear plants, arguing that doing so often leads to their replacement by fossil fuels.

=== Democracy and the Trump administration ===
In September 2025, Sunrise formally broadened its mission beyond climate to include opposing what it characterizes as the authoritarianism of the second Trump administration, framing democratic backsliding and climate inaction as linked threats.

== Reception and criticism ==
Alongside praise—including recognition as a leading climate charity and favorable comments from figures such as Noam Chomsky—the Sunrise Movement has drawn criticism over the feasibility of its agenda, its political strategy, and its internal organization. In May 2026, the conservative Manhattan Institute for Policy Research criticized Sunrise's tactics for potentially crossing legal and regulatory lines.

=== Feasibility and political strategy ===
Opponents have characterized the Green New Deal that Sunrise champions as unrealistic. During the group's February 2019 meeting with Senator Dianne Feinstein, Feinstein described the proposed resolution as "unworkable" and unlikely to pass the Republican-controlled Senate.

Commentators on the left have also questioned the effectiveness of Sunrise's tactics. Writing in Jacobin in 2021, Johnathan Guy and Sam Zacher credited the movement with popularizing the Green New Deal but argued it had "hit a wall," noting that media attention to its direct actions had waned and that it appeared unable to stop climate legislation from being watered down in Congress. They cited the columnist Matthew Yglesias, who argued that Sunrise had achieved little beyond favorable press coverage—an assessment the authors disputed.

In 2022, Time reported that the group was attempting to "reboot" amid a changed political environment, comparing its difficulties to the leadership disputes and declining influence that affected other high-profile movements of the same era, such as the Women's March and Time's Up.

=== Internal disputes ===
In 2021, the movement experienced internal conflict over its treatment of members of color. A group calling itself the Black Sunrise Caucus alleged that the organization had "tokenized" Black members and called on its leaders to step down. Alex O'Keefe, the group's creative director, said he was dismissed after circulating the caucus's letter of demands, and publicly accused the leadership of building a nonprofit co-opted by major donors. Sunrise responded that the level of Black participation had remained steady and that, by 2021, most of the caucus's demands had been met.

== Gallery ==
Logo until 2023

== See also ==
- Brand New Congress
- Citizens' Climate Lobby
- Extinction Rebellion
- Green New Deal
- Justice Democrats
- 2017 People's Climate March
- Project Hot Seat
- School Strike for Climate
