= Kathy Castor =

American lawyer & politician (born 1966)

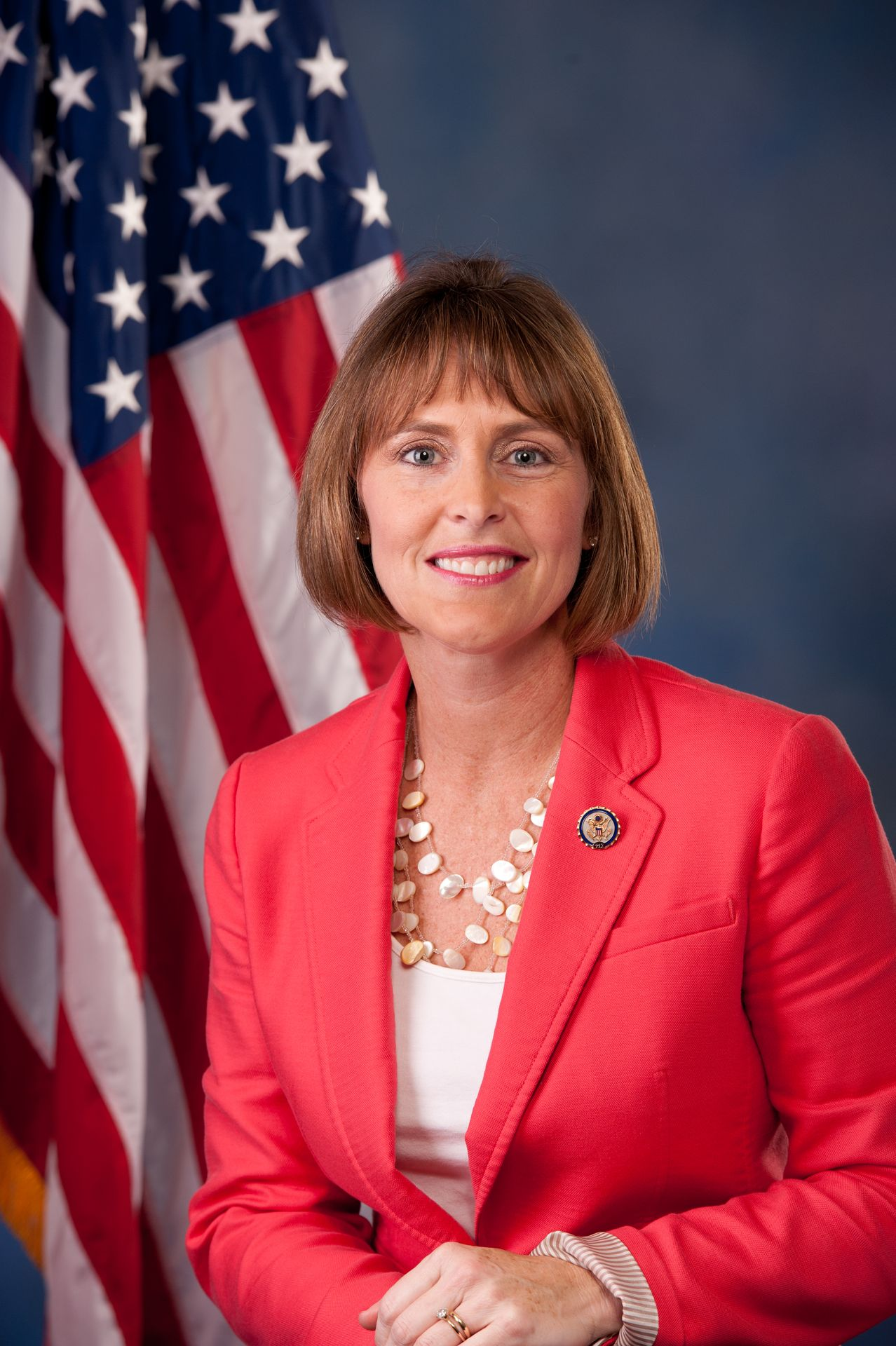
- Official portrait, 2012

Chair of the House Climate Crisis Committee
- In office January 3, 2019 – January 3, 2023
- Preceded by: Position established
- Succeeded by: Position abolished

Member of the U.S. House of Representatives from Florida
- Incumbent
- Assumed office January 3, 2007
- Preceded by: Jim Davis
- Constituency: 11th district (2007–2013); 14th district (2013–present)

Member of the Hillsborough County Commission from the 1st district
- In office January 2003 – January 2007
- Preceded by: Stacey Easterling
- Succeeded by: Rose Ferlita

Personal details
- Born: Katherine Anne Castor; August 20, 1966 (age 60) Miami, Florida, U.S.
- Party: Democratic
- Spouse: William Lewis
- Children: 2
- Relatives: Betty Castor (mother); Karen Castor Dentel (sister)
- Education: Emory University (BA); Florida State University (JD)
- Website: House website Campaign website
- Castor's voice Castor supporting the Climate Action Now Act. Recorded May 1, 2019

Katherine Anne Castor (/kæstər/ KASS-tər; born August 20, 1966) is an American politician and lawyer serving as the U.S. representative for Florida's 14th congressional district since 2007. The district, based in Tampa, was numbered as the 11th district from 2007 to 2013. A member of the Democratic Party, she previously served on the Hillsborough County Commission from 2002 to 2006.

== Early life and education ==
Kathy Castor was born in Miami and raised in Tampa. She is the daughter of politician and educator Betty Castor (née Elizabeth Bowe), who served as a Hillsborough County commissioner, Florida education commissioner, president of the University of South Florida, and member of the Florida Senate. Her father, Donald Castor, was a Hillsborough County judge. She has a brother and sister.

Castor attended Chamberlain High School and graduated in 1984. She then attended Emory University, where she earned a Bachelor of Arts in political science in 1988. As an undergraduate, she interned for U.S. Senator Lawton Chiles. She later received a Juris Doctor from the Florida State University College of Law in 1991.

== Early career ==
After graduating from law school, she served as an assistant general counsel for the Florida Department of Community Affairs until 1994. Her work there included issues related to growth management and land-use policy. She then worked in private practice as a land use attorney, including as a partner at the law firm Broad and Cassel. In 2000, she ran unsuccessfully for the Florida Senate.

== Hillsborough County Commission ==
Castor served on the Hillsborough County Board of Commissioners from 2002 to 2006. During her tenure, she worked on issues including transportation, health care, and growth management, and chaired the county’s Environmental Protection Commission. In 2005, she was the lone commissioner to vote against a resolution barring county recognition of gay pride events. She left the board following her election to the United States House of Representatives in 2006.

== U.S. House of Representatives ==
=== Elections ===
==== 2006 ====
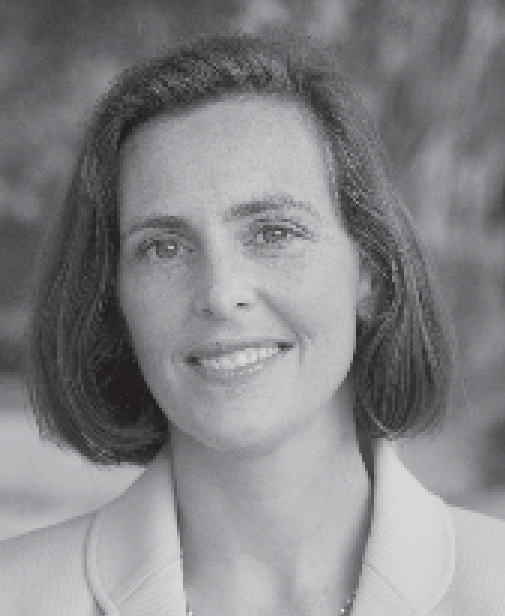
Castor in the 110th Congress, 2007

Castor entered the race for what was then the 11th district when five-term incumbent Jim Davis chose to run for governor, a race he later lost to Charlie Crist in the general election.

Castor won the September 5 Democratic primary—in what was widely regarded as the decisive contest in the only safe Democratic district on Florida’s Gulf Coast—defeating State Senator Les Miller, Al Fox, Scott Farrell, and Michael Steinberg. She received 54% of the vote, finishing more than 20 points ahead of Miller in the five-way race.

Eddie Adams Jr., an architect and former hospital laboratory technologist, was the only Republican to file. Castor was endorsed by the pro-choice political action committee EMILY's List, the League of Conservation Voters, Oceans Champions, The Tampa Tribune, The St. Petersburg Times and The Bradenton Herald.

Castor won the November general election, 70% to 30%, becoming the first woman to represent the Tampa Bay area in Congress and only the third person to represent this Tampa-based district since its creation in 1963 (it was the 10th district from 1963 to 1967, the 6th from 1967 to 1973, the 7th from 1973 to 1993, the 11th from 1993 to 2013, and has been the 14th since 2013).

==== 2010 ====
Castor defeated Republican nominee Mike Prendergast, a career military officer who retired in 2008 as a colonel in the United States Army, with 60% of the vote to Prendergast's 40%. It was the best showing for a Republican in this district since 1994.

==== 2012 ====
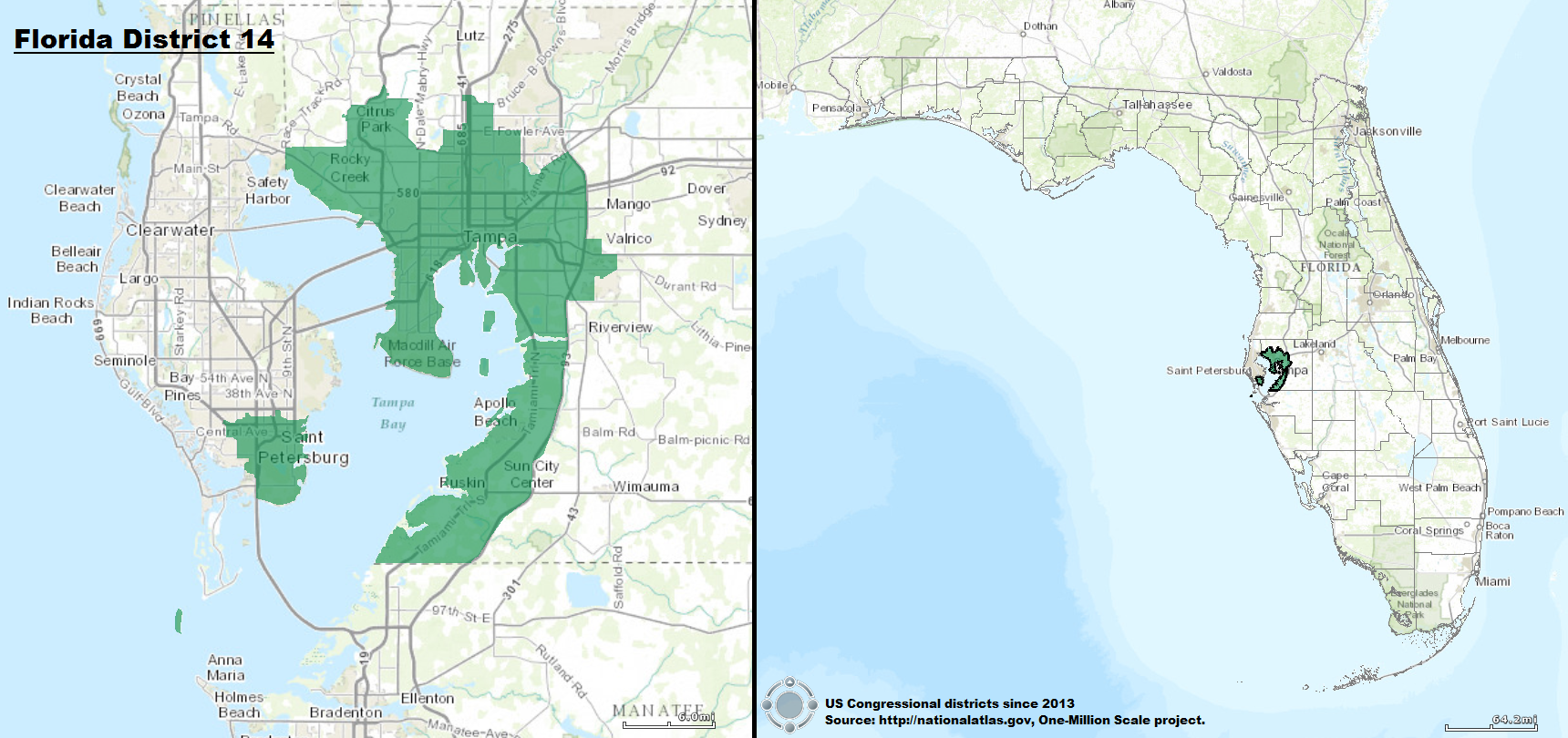
Florida's 14th congressional district, from 2013 to 2017

After the 2010 census, Florida gained two more congressional seats. As a result, Castor's district was renumbered the 14th. It was no less Democratic than its predecessor, and Castor was reelected with 70.2% of the vote over Republican E. J. Otero.

==== 2016 ====
Prendergast considered a rematch against Castor in 2016, but instead opted to run for sheriff of Citrus County. Christine Quinn, the founder of My Family Seasonings, challenged Castor instead, running on a pro-business and anti-immigration platform. A court-ordered redistricting cut out the district's share of St. Petersburg while pushing it further into Tampa, but it was no less Democratic than its predecessor, and Castor defeated Quinn with 61.8% of the vote to Quinn's 38.2%.

==== 2020 ====
In a rematch, Castor defeated Quinn in a slightly tighter race than four years prior with 60.3% of the vote to Quinn's 39.7%.

=== Tenure ===
==== Bush presidency (2007–2009) ====
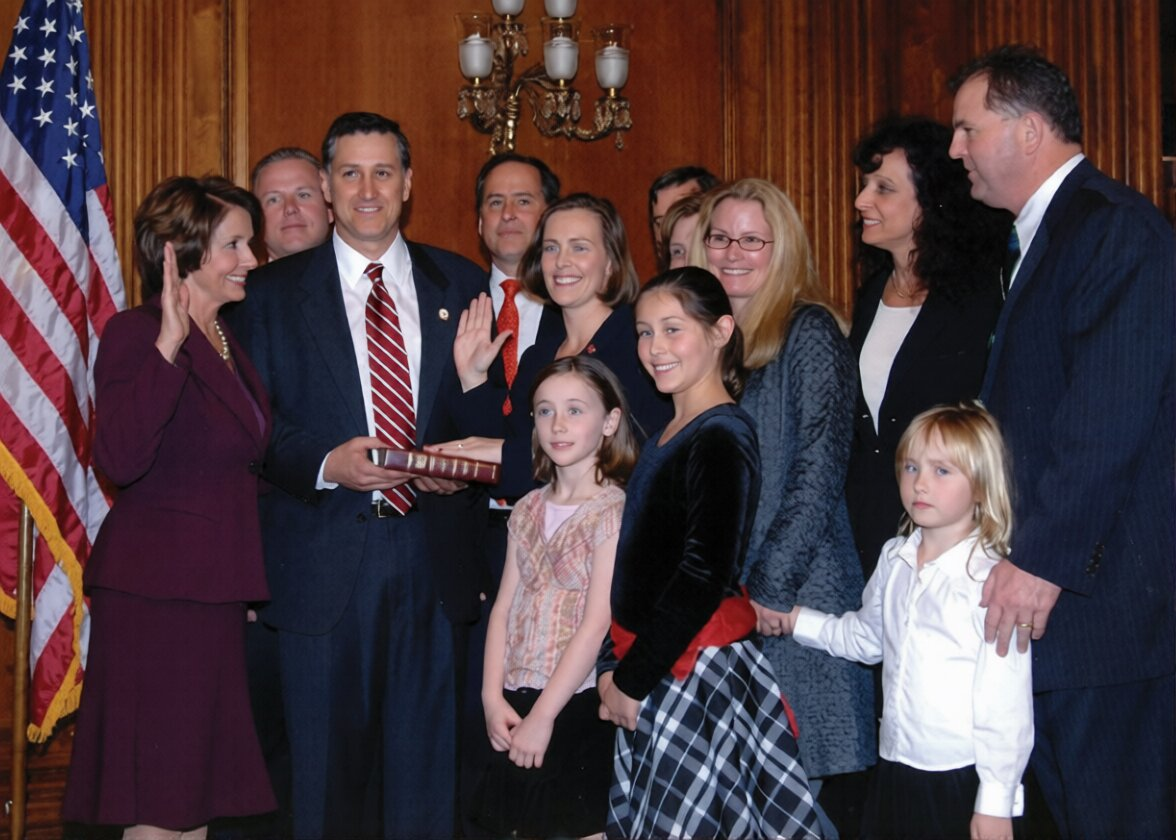
House Speaker Nancy Pelosi swears in Castor alongside her husband and family in 2007

Castor began serving in the U.S. House of Representatives in 2007, following the 2006 midterm elections, in which Democrats regained control of the House for the first time in 12 years. In her first term, she was appointed to the House Armed Services Committee, the House Rules Committee, and the House Steering and Policy Committee. Her early congressional priorities focused on housing, health care, veterans’ affairs, and energy policy. She backed coastal protection and energy provisions affecting Florida, including measures that maintained offshore drilling buffers in the eastern Gulf of Mexico.

As a freshman member of the 110th Congress, Castor sponsored legislation expanding benefits for Iraq and Afghanistan veterans, including improved educational assistance and health care services for wounded veterans treated at the James A. Haley Veterans’ Hospital in Tampa. She also pushed for the redeployment of forces in Afghanistan and in 2007 voted in favor of measures to withdraw U.S. troops from Iraq. The following year, she successfully championed legislation to allow low-income families with overdue medical bills to still be eligible for student loans. She also opposed the Emergency Economic Stabilization Act of 2008, also known as the "bailout bill", arguing it did not sufficiently protect middle-class families or taxpayers. She instead backed the Neighborhood Stabilization Program.

==== Obama presidency (2009–2017) ====
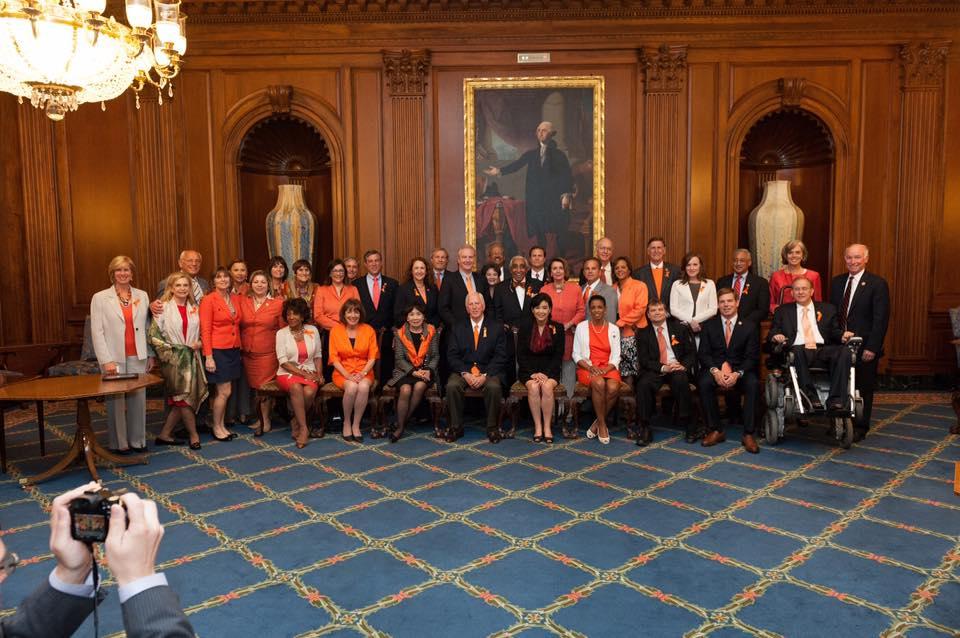
Castor wears orange with House members for gun violence awareness day in 2015

After winning reelection in 2008, during the election cycle that brought Barack Obama to the presidency, Castor was appointed to the House Energy and Commerce Committee in the 111th Congress. She later supported the American Recovery and Reinvestment Act of 2009, which she described as a key measure in stabilizing the economy. Recovery Act funds supported transportation, education, housing, research, law enforcement, and infrastructure projects in the Tampa Bay area, including the I-4/Crosstown Connector.

Republicans regained control of the House in the 2010 midterm elections. Castor later criticized the 2013 Republican sequester cuts affecting Head Start programs as well as research programs at Moffitt Cancer Center and the University of South Florida.

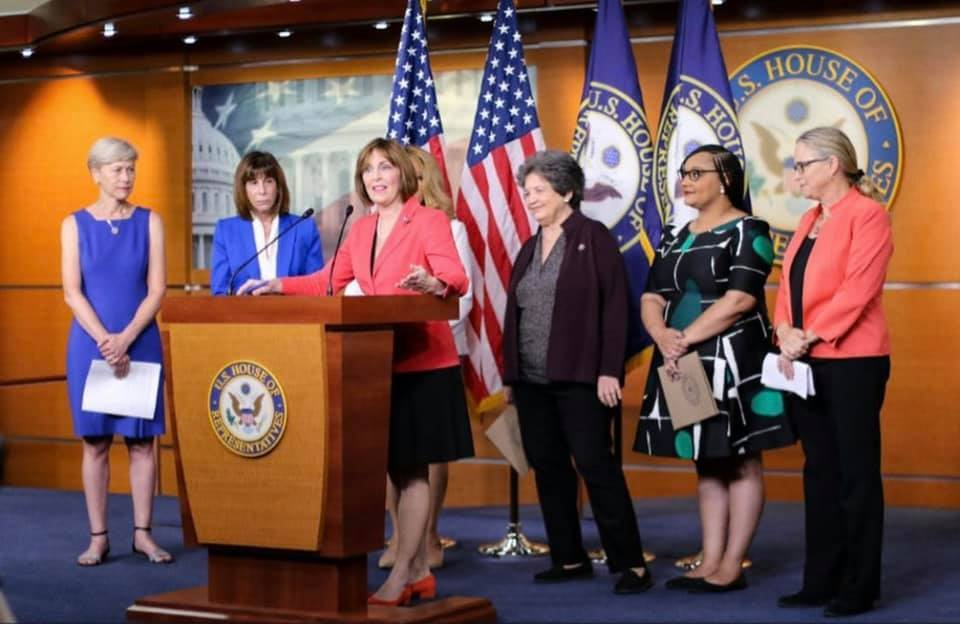
Castor pushes for expanded Medicaid coverage in Florida in 2021

In 2013, Castor supported the Affordable Care Act and later worked to educate Floridians about patient protections, health care rights, and enrollment in the health insurance marketplace. She criticized Governor Rick Scott and the Republican-controlled Florida Legislature for declining more than $50 billion in federal funding to expand Medicaid coverage in the state. In 2014, she supported a bipartisan budget agreement that restored Head Start funding with an increase of $1 billion over sequestration levels and $612 million over the previous year's enacted level.

During Obama's presidency, Castor supported improved relations between the United States and Cuba, and visited Cuba as part of a congressional delegation. In 2013, she filed an amicus brief supporting the Supreme Court striking down Section 3 of the Defense of Marriage Act (DOMA), and later welcomed the Court's 2015 decision in Obergefell v. Hodges legalizing same-sex marriage.

In 2016, Castor invited an undocumented immigrant to be her guest at the State of the Union address.

After the 2016 Pulse nightclub shooting in Orlando, she participated in John Lewis's congressional sit-in to demand that those on the No Fly List lose the right to purchase firearms. While acknowledging that not allowing those on the No Fly List from buying guns or banning assault rifles might not have prevented the shooting, she argued that "common sense laws" could help prevent future tragedies. Following the Stoneman Douglas High School shooting in Parkland, Florida, in 2018, Castor again called for expanded federal funding for gun violence prevention research through repeal of the Dickey Amendment, which had limited such funding for the CDC.

==== First Trump presidency (2017–2021) ====
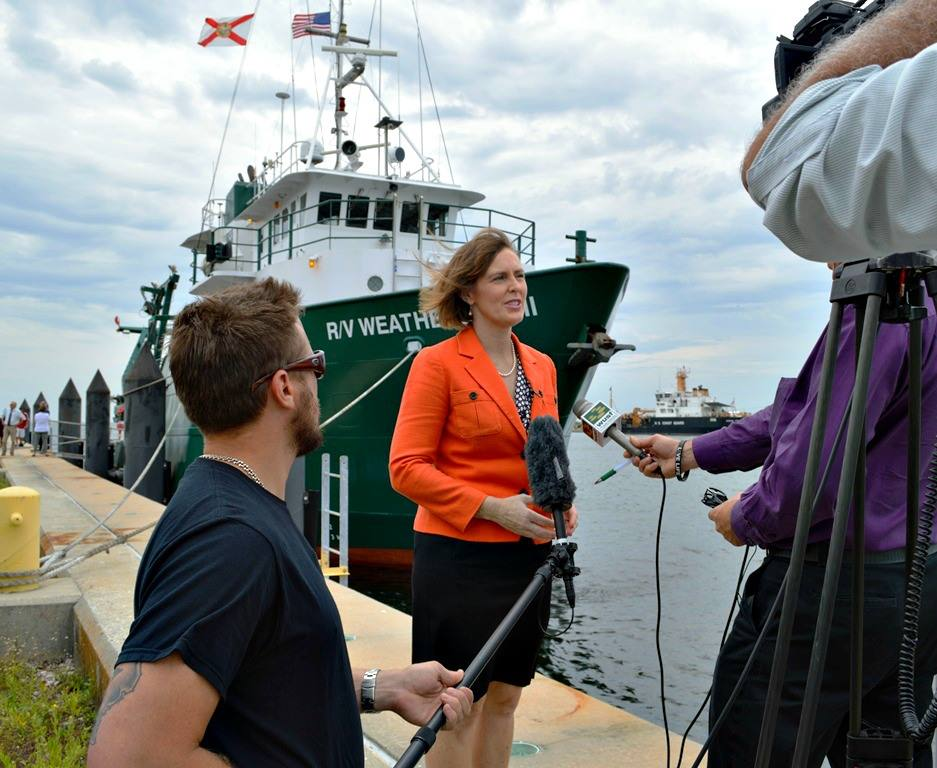
Castor speaks on water quality and harmful algal blooms, 2018

After Democrats regained control of the House in the 2018 midterm elections, Castor was appointed chair of the House Select Committee on the Climate Crisis, which was established at the start of the 116th Congress in 2019 to develop recommendations on climate policy. The panel later produced a broad climate action framework that influenced subsequent Democratic climate legislation. As chair, Castor was credited with helping advance congressional climate policy initiatives. In December 2019, Castor voted to impeach President Donald Trump on charges of abuse of power and obstruction of Congress.

==== Biden presidency (2021–2025) ====
In 2021, after President Trump left office, Castor joined 267 members of the House in voting to repeal the Authorization for Use of Military Force Against Iraq Resolution of 2002. She argued the repeal would restore Congress's constitutional authority over the use of military force and prevent future presidents from using the authorization to justify unrelated military actions. Castor stated that repealing the resolution would allow Congress to "once more execute its solemn constitutional responsibility" and "end the blank check for war."

Republicans regained control of the House in the 2022 midterm elections. The following year, Castor voted in favor of security assistance for Israel after the Hamas attacks on October 7. In July 2024, she called for President Joe Biden to withdraw from the presidential election, which was later won by Donald Trump.

==== Second Trump presidency (2025–present) ====
In 2025, Castor proposed legislation to prohibit power companies from using ratepayer revenues for lobbying and campaign donations. The following year, ahead of the 2026 midterm elections, Florida Republicans approved a redistricting map that opponents described as a partisan gerrymander and that significantly weakened several Democratic-held districts, including Castor's. Castor described the map as "blatantly unconstitutional" but committed to seeking reelection in Florida's 14th congressional district.

In September 2026, Castor voted for a resolution which denounced socialism and the Democratic Socialists of America, and called for the passage of the SAVE America Act.

=== Committee assignments ===
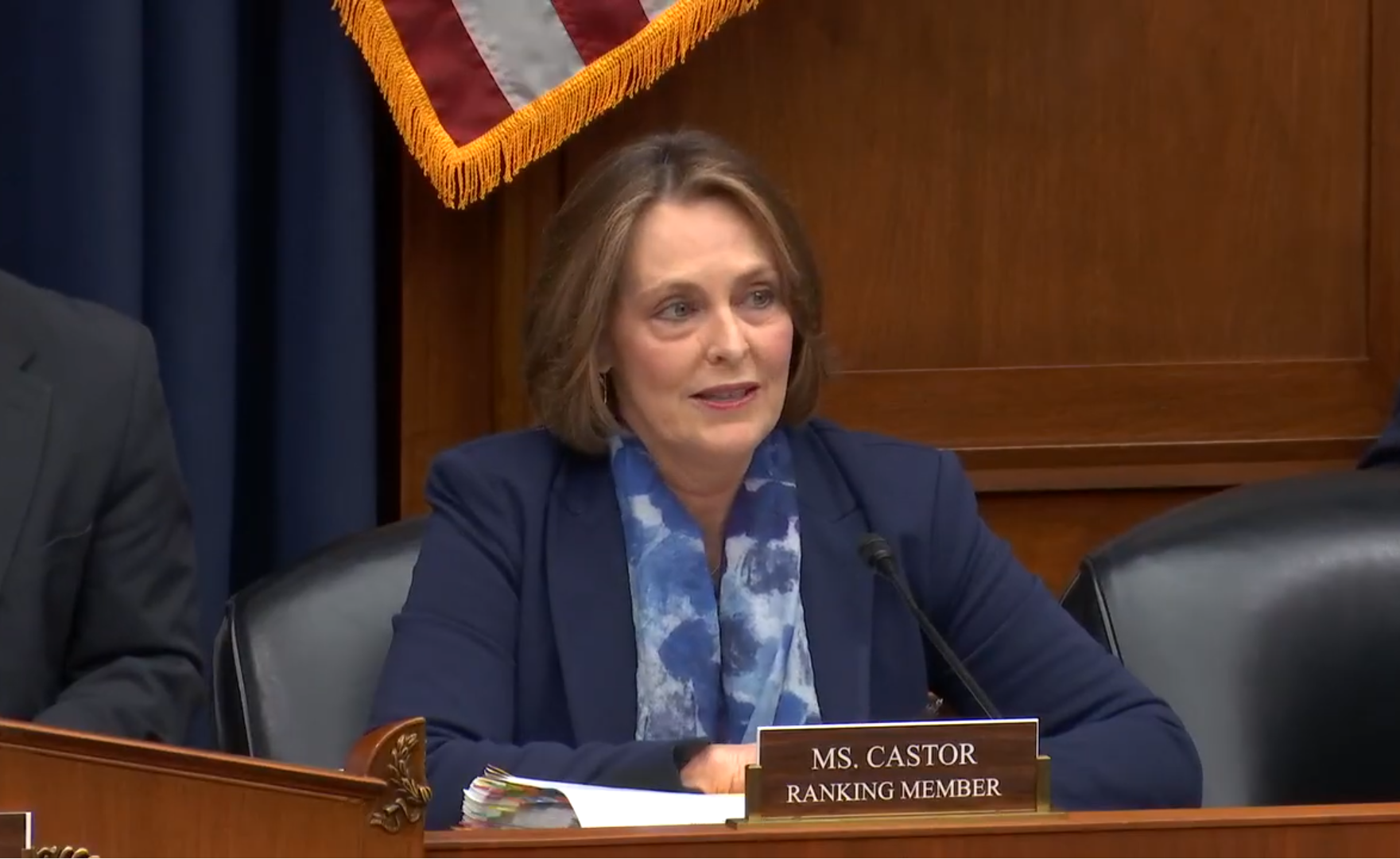
Castor on the Energy and Commerce Committee in 2025

For the 119th Congress:

- Committee on Energy and Commerce
  - Subcommittee on Commerce, Manufacturing, and Trade
  - Subcommittee on Communications and Technology
  - Subcommittee on Energy (Ranking Member)
- Select Committee on Strategic Competition between the United States and the Chinese Communist Party

=== Caucus memberships ===
Castor's caucus memberships include:

- Special Operations Caucus (co-chair)
- Academic Medicine Caucus (co-chair)
- Children's Health Care Caucus (co-chair)
- Air Force Caucus (co-chair)
- Congressional Soccer Caucus (co-chair)
- Congressional Arts Caucus
- Congressional Equality Caucus

== Personal life ==
Castor is married to William Lewis, whom she met while attending law school. They live in Tampa, Florida, and have two children. She is a member of the Presbyterian Church.

She is not related to Tampa mayor Jane Castor.

== Electoral history ==
2006 U.S. House of Representatives election, Florida's 11th district
Primary election
Party	Candidate	Votes	%
Democratic	Kathy Castor	21,310	53.96%
Democratic	Les Miller	13,474	34.12%
Democratic	Scott Farrell	1,721	4.36%
Democratic	Al Fox	1,653	4.19%
Democratic	Michael Steinberg	1,336	3.38%
Total votes		39,494	100
General election
Democratic	Kathy Castor	97,470	69.65%
Republican	Eddie Adams, Jr.	42,454	30.34%
Write-in		18	0.01%
Total votes		139,942	100
Democratic hold			

2008 U.S. House of Representatives election, Florida's 11th district
Party	Candidate	Votes	%
Democratic	Kathy Castor (incumbent)	184,106	71.66%
Republican	Eddie Adams, Jr.	72,825	28.34%
Total votes		256,931	100
Democratic hold			

2010 U.S. House of Representatives election, Florida's 11th district
Primary election
Party	Candidate	Votes	%
Democratic	Kathy Castor (incumbent)	29,556	85.29%
Democratic	Tim Curtis	5,097	14.71%
Total votes		34,653	100
General election
Democratic	Kathy Castor (incumbent)	91,328	59.63%
Republican	Mike Prendergast	61,817	40.37%
Total votes		153,145	100
Democratic hold			

2012 U.S. House of Representatives election, Florida's 14th district
Party	Candidate	Votes	%
Democratic	Kathy Castor (incumbent)	197,121	70.25%
Republican	EJ Otero	83,480	29.75%
Total votes		280,601	100
Democratic hold			

2014 U.S. House of Representatives election, Florida's 14th district
Party	Candidate	Votes	%
Democratic	Kathy Castor (incumbent)	unopposed	100%
Total votes		N/A	100
Democratic hold			

2016 U.S. House of Representatives election, Florida's 14th district
Party	Candidate	Votes	%
Democratic	Kathy Castor (incumbent)	195,789	61.79%
Republican	Christine Quinn	121,088	38.21%
Total votes		316,877	100
Democratic hold			

2018 U.S. House of Representatives election, Florida's 14th district
Party	Candidate	Votes	%
Democratic	Kathy Castor (incumbent)	unopposed	100%
Total votes		N/A	100
Democratic hold			

2020 U.S. House of Representatives election, Florida's 14th district
Party	Candidate	Votes	%
Democratic	Kathy Castor (incumbent)	224,240	60.26%
Republican	Christine Quinn	147,896	39.74%
Total votes		372,136	100
Democratic hold			

2022 U.S. House of Representatives election, Florida's 14th district
Primary election
Party	Candidate	Votes	%
Democratic	Kathy Castor (incumbent)	62,562	90.35%
Democratic	Christopher Bradley	6,684	9.65%
Total votes		69,246	100
General election
Democratic	Kathy Castor (incumbent)	149,737	56.90%
Republican	James Judge	113,427	43.10%
Total votes		263,164	100
Democratic hold			

2024 U.S. House of Representatives election, Florida's 14th district
Party	Candidate	Votes	%
Democratic	Kathy Castor (incumbent)	199,423	56.95%
Republican	Robert "Rocky" Rochford	145,643	41.59%
Independent	Christopher Bradley	2,595	0.74%
Libertarian	Nathaniel Snyder	2,524	0.72%
Total votes		350,185	100
Democratic hold			

== See also ==
- Women in the United States House of Representatives

U.S. House of Representatives
Preceded by Jim Davis	Member of the U.S. House of Representatives from Florida's 11th congressional district 2007–2013	Succeeded by Rich Nugent
Preceded by Connie Mack	Member of the U.S. House of Representatives from Florida's 14th congressional district 2013–present	Incumbent
New office	Chair of the House Climate Crisis Committee; 2019–2023	Position abolished
U.S. order of precedence (ceremonial)
Preceded by Vern Buchanan	United States representatives by seniority 55th	Succeeded by Yvette Clarke
Preceded by Vern Buchanan	Order of precedence of the United States	Succeeded by Adrian Smith
