= Project Hot Seat =

Political campaign by Greenpeace

- Founded: 2006
- Dissolved: 2009
- Ideology: Climate movement Progressivism
- Political position: Center-left

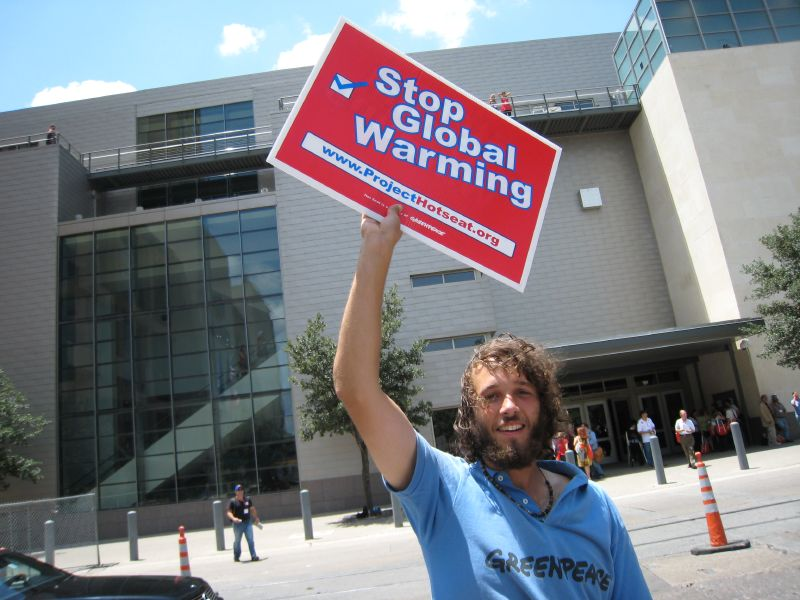
Man holding a sign promoting the campaign outside of the venue for Netroots Nation 2008

Project Hot Seat (PHS) was a Greenpeace USA campaign to pressure Congress members in order to implement policies that will cut greenhouse gas emissions. PHS was created in 2006. In 2009, PHS was renamed to Climate Rescue.

== Purpose ==
PHS goals included:

- A national cap and trade system
- A national renewable energy standard of at least 20% by 2020
- An increase in average fuel economy to 40 mpg

Phil Radford said PHS was the "kind of organizing that is going to be key to making the environmental movement into a viable political force in Congress and around the country".

== Activities ==
PHS members worked to raise awareness of global warming by organizing events, such as "The International Day of Action", in which volunteers held rallies and outreach events. The most recent was held on December 8, 2007. In one event, 25 people took a polar bear swim in Puget Sound. In another, 300 participants on a Florida beach used their bodies to spell out the words "Save our State". PHS members collected postcards to send to Congress.

In 2006, PHS supported Henry Waxman's Safe Climate Act.
