= Boston Green New Deal =

Policies by the mayor of Boston, US

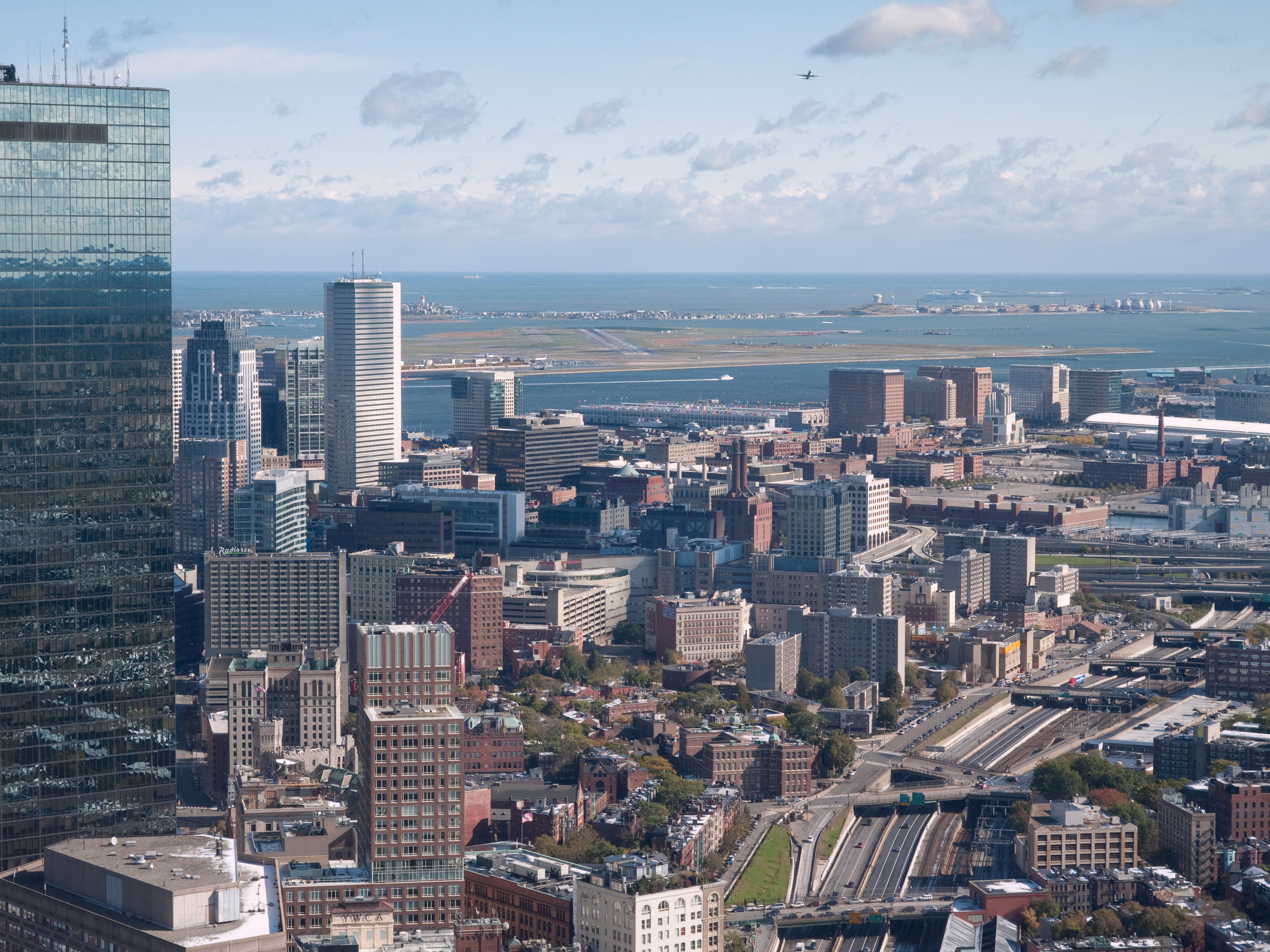
City of Boston in 2011

The municipal "Green New Deal" of Boston, Massachusetts in the United States is a Green New Deal policy agenda promoted by Michelle Wu (the current mayor of Boston). She first proposed it in August 2020 when she was a member of the Boston City Council. During Wu's mayoralty, which began in November 2021, she has implemented a number of environmental policies and projects in-line with the goals of her Green New Deal plan.

== Initial proposal ==
Cover page of the Boston Green New Deal & Just Recovery

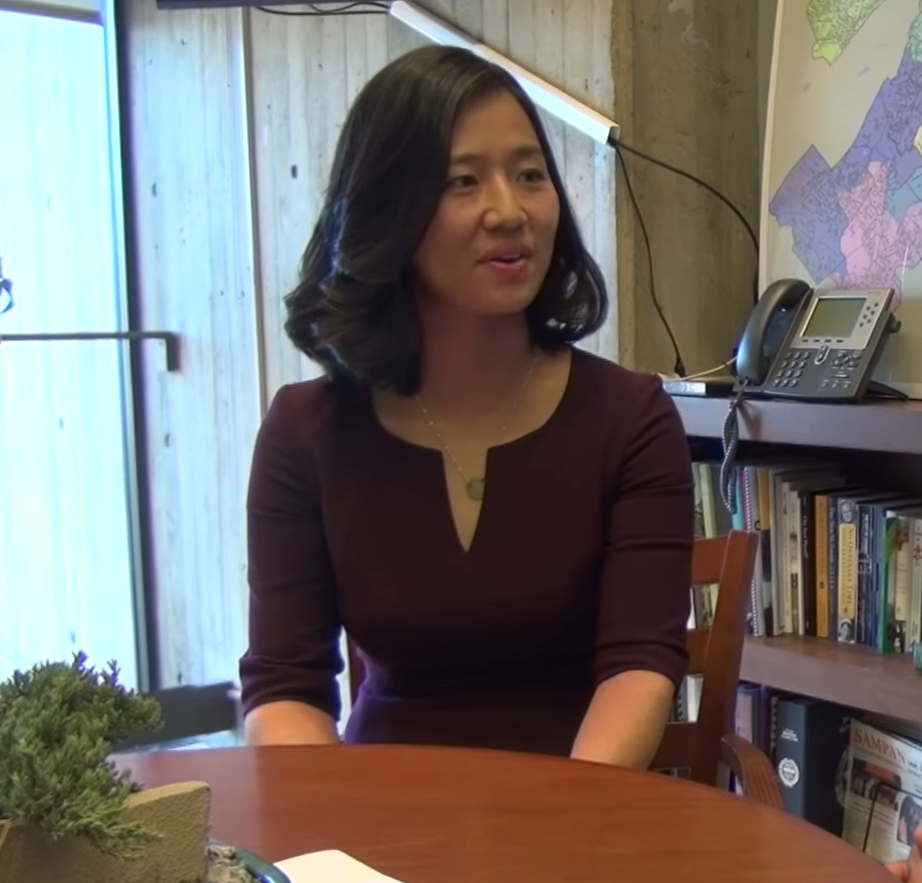
Michelle Wu in 2019

In August 2020, Wu released a document outlining plans for a "Boston Green New Deal & Just Recovery". The proposal aimed to achieve carbon neutrality (net-zero carbon footprint) for the municipal government buildings by 2024, running the city on 100% renewable energy by 2030, and achieving citywide carbon neutrality by 2040.

The document also outlined a need for the city to facilitate an equitable recovery from the impacts of the COVID-19 pandemic in Boston. Included in this priority was "equitable small business recovery".

The document called for the city to divest from fossil fuel industries as well as "harmful industries", such as gun manufacturers and private prisons. It called for the city to instead invest in the clean energy industries and community-based financial institutions. The document also called for food justice. Wu had already worked on the issue of food justice as a City Council member: in March 2019, the City Council unanimously passed the Good Food Purchasing Program ordinance authored by Wu, an ordinance which set new requirements for public food purchasers, such as Boston Public Schools.

The document included plans related to housing. These called for "decommodifying housing" through the expansion of cooperative housing, community land trusts, and community ownerships. It also called for the establishment of a renters' right to counsel, giving legal representation to tenants in order to protect them against unwanted or potentially illegal evictions. The document also called for creating "just and resilient development" through the establishment of affordable green overlay districts and standard community benefits agreements. The document included a plan to use priority planning zones informed by urban heat island maps, in order to expand the urban tree canopy. The stated benefits of planting more trees would be carbon sequestration, cleaner air, temperature regulation, and community benefit.

The document called for "transportation justice" by having the city improve, "the accessibility and reliability of multimodal infrastructure by prioritizing and allocating street space for active transportation modes." It also called for the city to pursue fare-free transit. Fare-free public transit was a cause that Wu had already been promoting. Wu had first brought up the idea of fare-free public transit in Boston in a January 2019 op-ed she published in The Boston Globe. Later in 2019, she and fellow councilor Kim Janey proposed making the MBTA Route 28 bus fare-free. Wu was a local leader in promoting the idea of fare-free public transit. Crediting Wu as a leader on fare-free public transit, in January 2021, the editorial board of The Boston Globe endorsed the idea of making the city's buses fare-free. Wu's promotion of fare-free public transit also inspired Lawrence, Massachusetts mayor Daniel Rivera to implement it in his city.

The Green New Deal document also called for a "local blue new deal" which would address coastal and ocean-related climate concerns. This would include using coastal and ocean resources for clean energy generation, sustainable food systems, carbon capture, and jobs. Another proposal it contained was for Boston to utilize Green Municipal Bonds and the city's Property Assessed Clean Energy program to remove barriers to installing solar energy and efficiency measures in order to accelerate their adoption by the municipal government, private residents, and private businesses. It also proposed having a comprehensive justice audit to identify institutional harms, and using the findings of such an audit to shape a citywide justice framework to reshape decision-making. It also called for "green workforce development" and the creation of an urban climate corps.

== Initial pursuit of goals before Wu's mayoralty ==
In March 2021, Wu, along with Councilors Lydia Edwards and Matt O'Malley, introduced an ordinance that would have divested city funds from the private prison industry, as well as from the fossil fuel and tobacco industries. This aligned with such a proposal contained in the original Green New Deal document.

In 2021, Acting Mayor Kim Janey funded a pilot program to make the MBTA Route 28 bus fare-free for three months. This is something she and Wu had previously proposed together. This aligned with Wu's Green New Deal's proposal for fare-free bus transit.

On the matter of an equitable recovery from the COVID-19 pandemic, Wu chaired City Council hearings on the subject. In February 2021, Wu proposed legislation that would seek to create an equitable distribution of the COVID-19 vaccine in Boston by requiring that at least one vaccination site be established in each residential neighborhood. In the late summer of 2021, Wu's office compiled data that suggested that half of the city's COVID-19 pandemic Restaurant Revitalization Fund money that had been allocated to restaurants was given to establishments in only three of the city's 23 neighborhoods (Back Bay, Downtown Boston, and the Seaport District). It was noted that these were largely white and wealthy neighborhoods in comparison to the rest of the city.

On the matter of food justice, October 2020 Wu published a report on a "food justice" agenda in Boston. The agenda laid out included increasing the minimum wage for food-sector workers and providing guaranteed paid sick leave to them. The plan also called for the city government to support state legislation that would gradually phase out the tipped wage for restaurant and bar workers.

== Pursuit of goals during Wu’s mayoralty ==
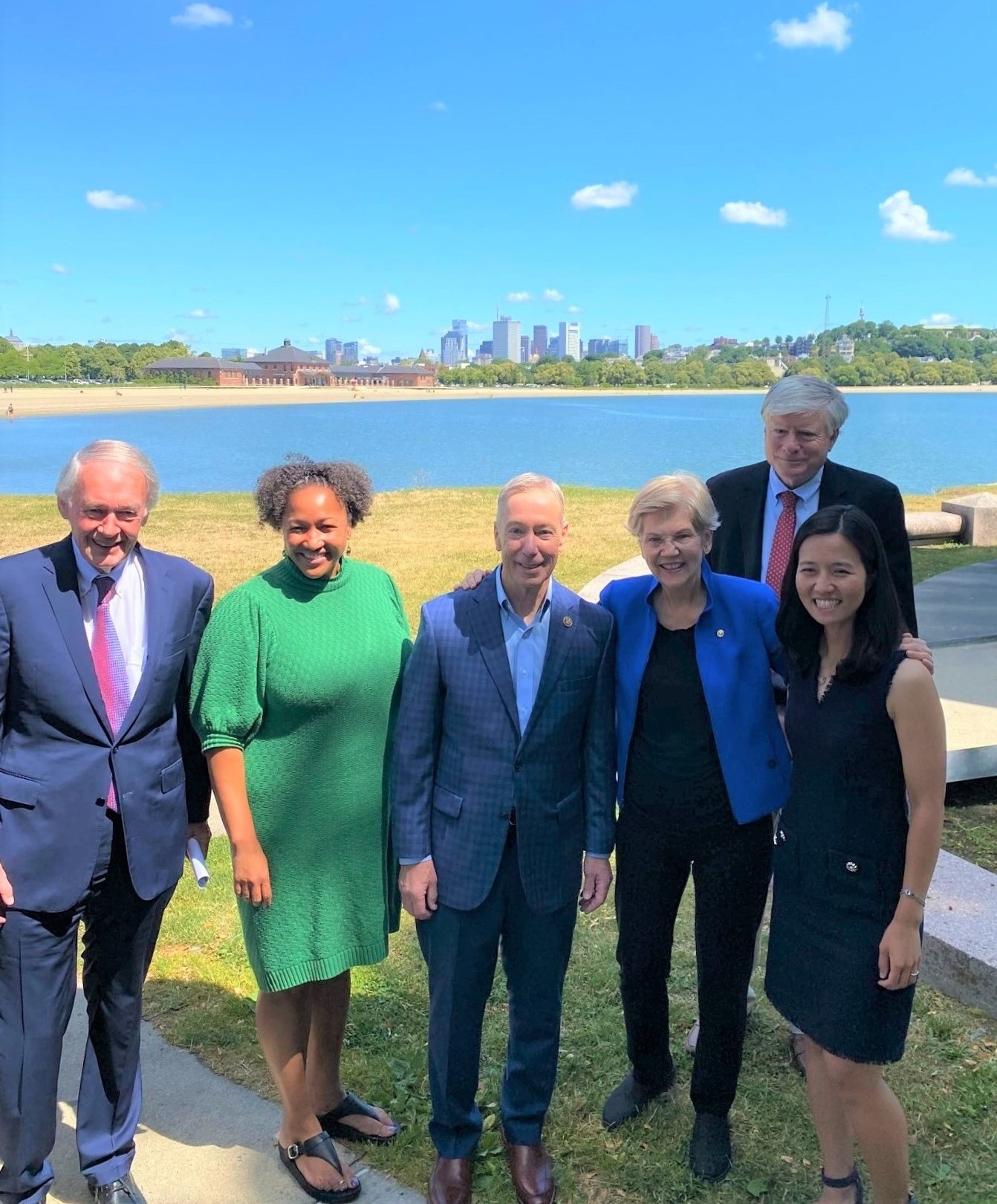
Wu (far right) celebrates federal funding for climate resilience efforts at an event held at Moakley Park in June 2023, joined by other political leaders, including U.S. Senator Ed Markey, Boston Chief of Environment Mariama White-Hammond, U.S. Congressman Stephen Lynch, and U.S. Senator Elizabeth Warren

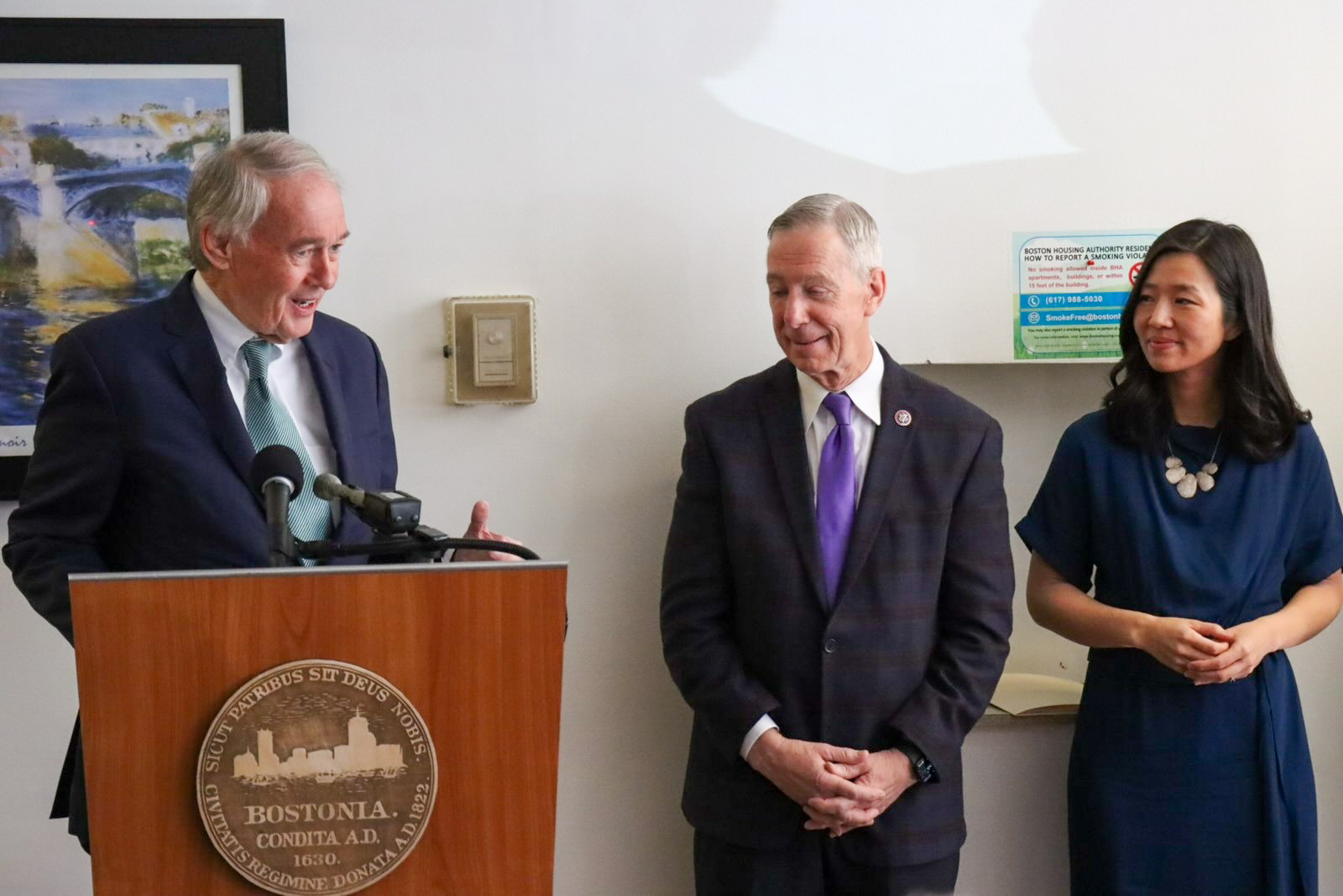
Wu (right) joins U.S. Senator Ed Markey (left) and U.S. Congressman Stephen Lynch at the March 2023 announcement of federal funding to make Ausonia Apartments more energy-efficient and climate-resilient

Wu's platform in her 2021 mayoral campaign included a "climate justice" plan that featured her municipal Green New Deal. Wu touted her proposed municipal Green New Deal as helping to combat the racial wealth gap. Wu's campaign also tied her proposed municipal Green New Deal into its plan for economic justice and workers rights. During her mayoral campaign, her platform's plan for education further outlined what she dubbed a "Green New Deal" for Boston Public Schools. Her plan described this as addressing a need for a, "wholesale shift in how we manage our school facilities to lift up our school communities, build healthy and nurturing physical environments, and align with our broader civic goals of equity, opportunity, engagement." It envisioned schools as becoming, "full-service community hubs that can adapt to meet the evolving needs of our students and our city."

Wu retained Mariama White-Hammond in her role as the city's chief of environment, energy, and open space; a position focused on environmentalism. In August 2022, Wu announced that, in the following month, Oliver Sellers-Garcia would begin serving in the newly created senior advisory position of "green new deal director". This position advises the mayor's office on steps towards climate resiliency. In September 2022, Wu announced the creation of the Cabinet for Worker Empowerment. One of the tasks this new department was given is to oversee the implementation of her Green New Deal for Boston Public Schools.

As mayor, Wu extended the pilot for fare-free public transit on the route 28 bus, adding two additional routes to serve other lower-income areas of the city free of charge for all riders beginning March 1, 2022, and extending for two years. The charges were picked up by the city using funds from $8 million in federal pandemic relief funds. Wu's advocacy is seen as popularizing the idea of fare-free public transportation in Boston.

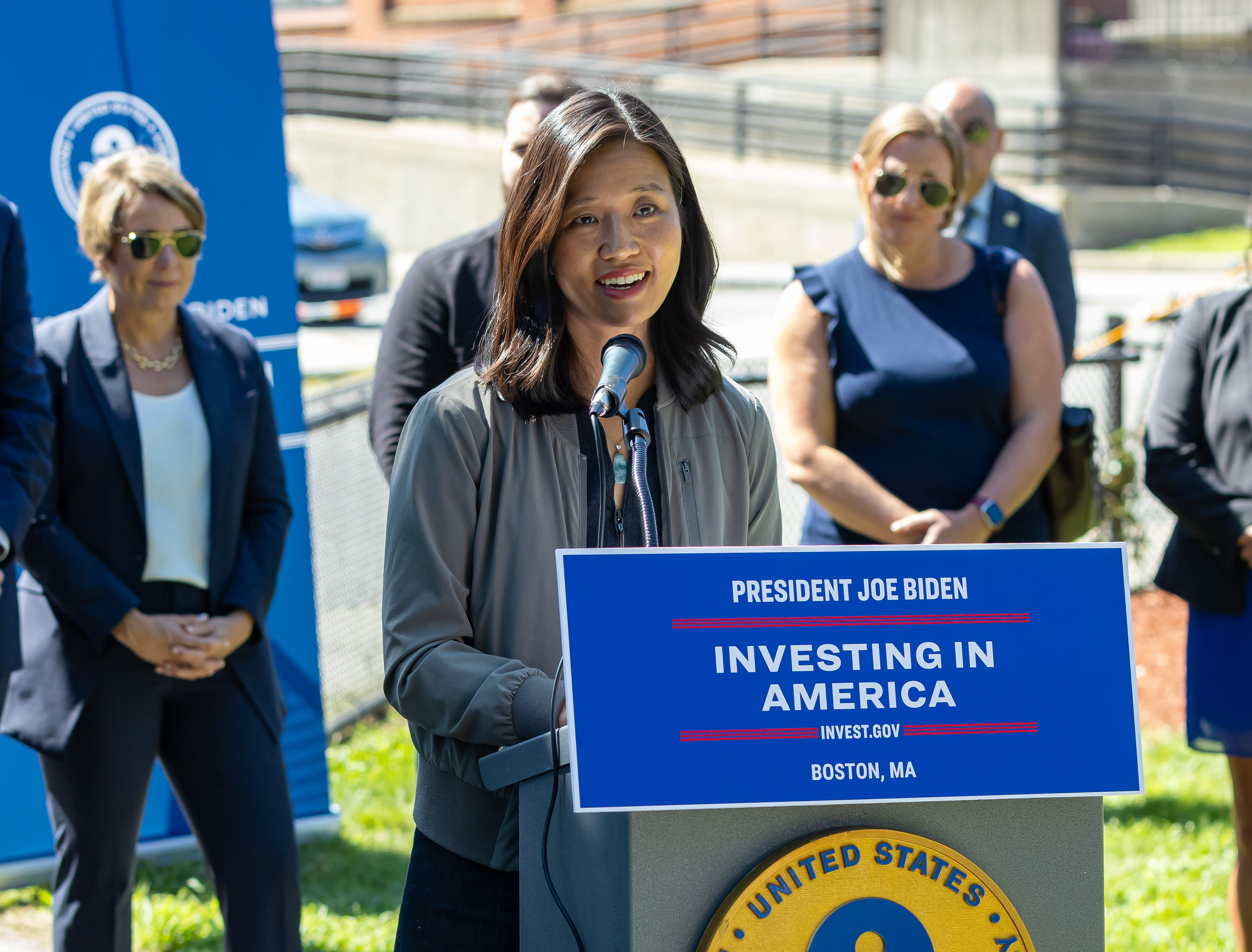
Wu at a 2023 event promoting local projects being funded with support from the Environmental Protection Agency's new $27 billion Greenhouse Gas Reduction Fund

In 2021, Boston's government created a green jobs program called Power Corps. As mayor, Wu has served on the steering committee of Climate Mayors.

On November 22, 2021, Wu signed an ordinance to divest city investments from companies that derive more than 15 percent of their revenue from fossil fuels, tobacco products, or prison facilities. This is seen as being part of her pursuit of a municipal Green New Deal for Boston. The process will entail the divestment of $65 million in city assets. The new rules do not apply to Boston's employee pension fund, which is governed by state law. While a member of the city council, she had fought for the adoption of such a policy, which is included in her original Green New Deal document.

In August 2022, Wu unveiled a proposed home rule petition that would see the city request entrance to the state's pilot program for municipalities to ban fossil fuels from most new buildings, with the exception of labs and hospitals. The following month, the Boston City Council approved the home rule petition 9–3. However, the petition further required state approval in order to be granted. In July 2023, Wu signed an executive order formally barring the use of fossil fuels such as heating oil and natural gas in new city-owned buildings, and requiring or in major renovations of municipal government buildings. It also requires the elimination of combustion and fossil fuels when any municipal government buildings undergo a replacement of their HVAC, water heating, or cooking appliances. In November 2023, Wu stated in an interview that the city government would not be participating in a state government pilot program for 10 cities and towns to require property developers in their communities to only construct all-electric buildings (despite 70% of the city's greenhouse gas inventory being accounted for by emissions from buildings) because the pilot program did not appear to be designed for the city and because she received "clear indications that Boston would not be chosen for the one available spot." In April 2024, the Wu administration announced the appointment of the city government's first chief climate officer and $75 million in capital funding under the city government's 2025 fiscal year budget to procure state and federal climate resilience grants.

On May 16, 2022, Wu pledged that the city would implement a "Green New Deal" for Boston Public Schools (BPS) school buildings, which will see renovation of existing facilities and the construction new ones. This plan expands the funding the city is to invest in school construction from the $1 billion outlined in Marty Walsh's 2015 BuildBPS plan to $2 billion. In September 2022, Wu announced the creation of the Cabinet for Worker Empowerment. One of the tasks this new department was given is to oversee the implementation of her Green New Deal for Boston Public Schools.

In April 2022, on Earth Day, as part of the city's Climate Ready Boston efforts, Wu unveiled the Heat Resilience for Boston plan. This plan centers on combatting the impacts of rising heat extremes, focusing on the "environmental justice communities" of Chinatown, Dorchester, East Boston, Mattapan, and Roxbury. Wu also announced the creation of the Boston Extreme Temperatures Response Task Force to coordinate efforts across the city related to handling heat extremes.

In August 2022, Wu announced that, in the following month, Oliver Sellers-Garcia would begin serving in the newly created senior advisory position of "green new deal director". This position advises the mayor's office on steps towards climate resiliency.

In April 2022, Wu announced that the city would replace its entire fleet of school buses with electric vehicles (EVs) by 2030, beginning with an acquisition 30 EV buses during the 2022–23 school year. She also announced that she would launch a program to train workers in EV maintenance. In May 2022, Wu's administration awarded a $17 million contract to City Fresh Foods, a local Black-owned business, to be a vendor for Boston City Schools. The contract was characterized as helping to achieve the goals of the Good Food Purchasing Program that was created by an ordinance that had been authored by Wu as a city councilwoman targeted at "food justice". As part of a $20 million housing program funded through COVID recovery funds, Wu's mayoral administration launch a "Large Building Green Energy Retrofits Program" providing building owners of buildings with fifteen or more units up to $10,000 to support efforts to reduce their buildings' energy use through "deep energy retrofits". The program is targeted at retrofitting the city's existing housing stock.

In September 2022 the Boston City Council voted 9–3 to allow the city to potentially enter the State of Massachusetts' new pilot program that would permit ten communities to prohibit most newly-constructed buildings (including private development) from relying on fossil fuels –with exceptions for the construction of labs and hospitals. Wu initially applied for the city to enter the program. However, in November 2023, she announced that she would no longer be pursuing inclusion of Boston in the program, claiming that its specifics were not workable in Boston due to its large populace and the constraints of the city's existing electrical system. She also claimed that there had been indications given that the state was not intending to select Boston as a participant in the pilot program.

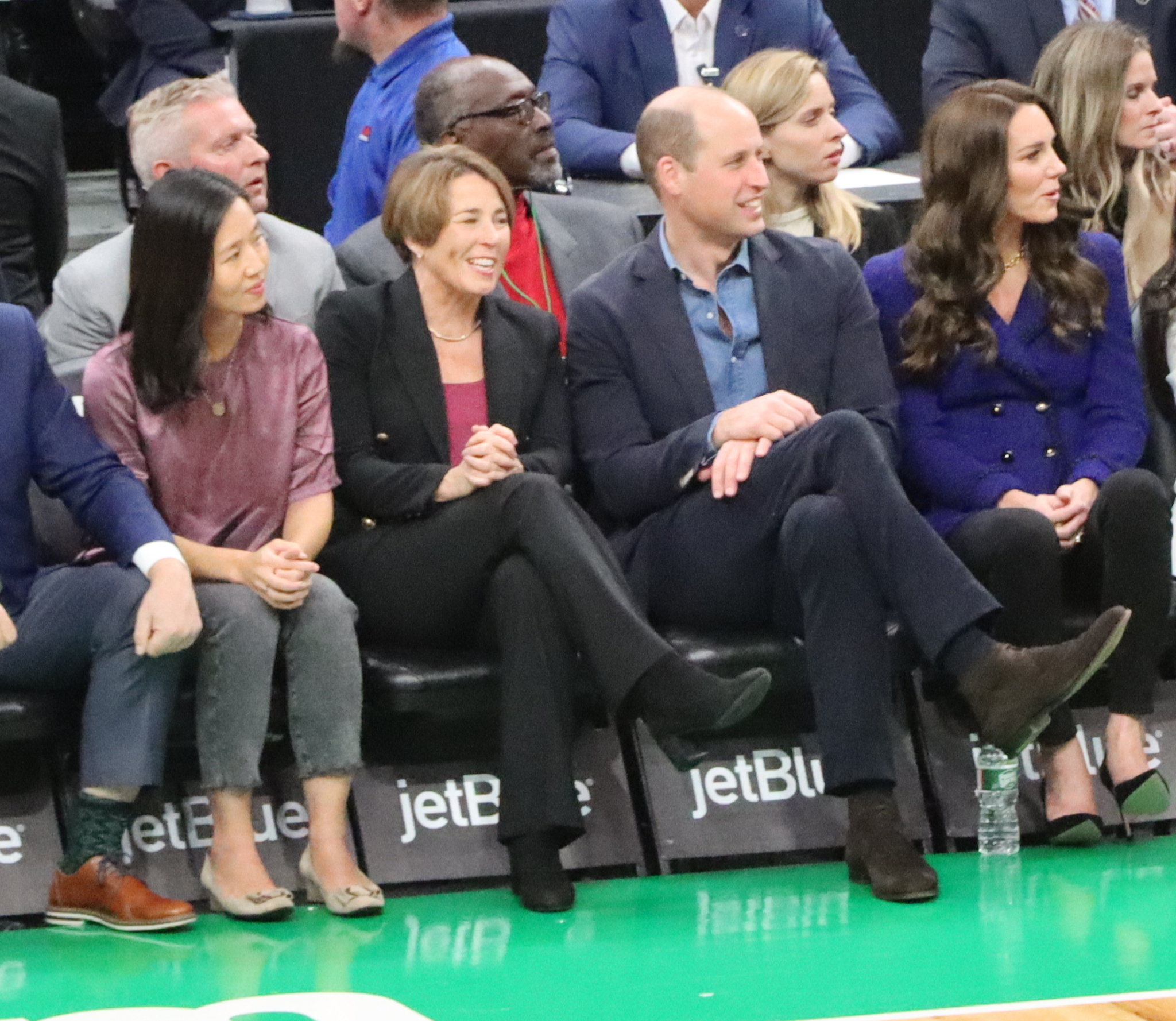
Wu (far left) at a November 2022 Boston Celtics game with Governor-elect Maura Healey, Celtics alum Satch Sanders and diplomatic guests William, Prince of Wales and Catherine, Princess of Wales (who were in Boston for the 2022 Earthshot Prize)

In July 2022, it was announced that the ceremonies for the second edition of the Earthshot Prize, an environmentalism award founded by William, Prince of Wales and The Royal Foundation, would be held in Boston in December 2022. The City of Boston joined the John F. Kennedy Presidential Library and Museum as host partners for the award ceremony. Wu spoke with Prince William about arrangements for the event. In early November 2022, it was announced that the event's official host committee would include Wu, along with Governor Charlie Baker, John Kerry (the U.S. special presidential envoy for climate), Karen Spilka (president of the Massachusetts Senate), and Ronald Mariano (speaker of the Massachusetts House of Representatives). During their time in Boston for the awards, Wu spent time with William, Prince of Wales and Catherine, Princess of Wales.

In 2023, Wu announced that the city would be offering deep energy retrofit grants to help fund the retrofitting of affordable housing units to greater energy efficiency. Wu has also aimed to transition Boston Housing Authority properties away from using fossil fuels.

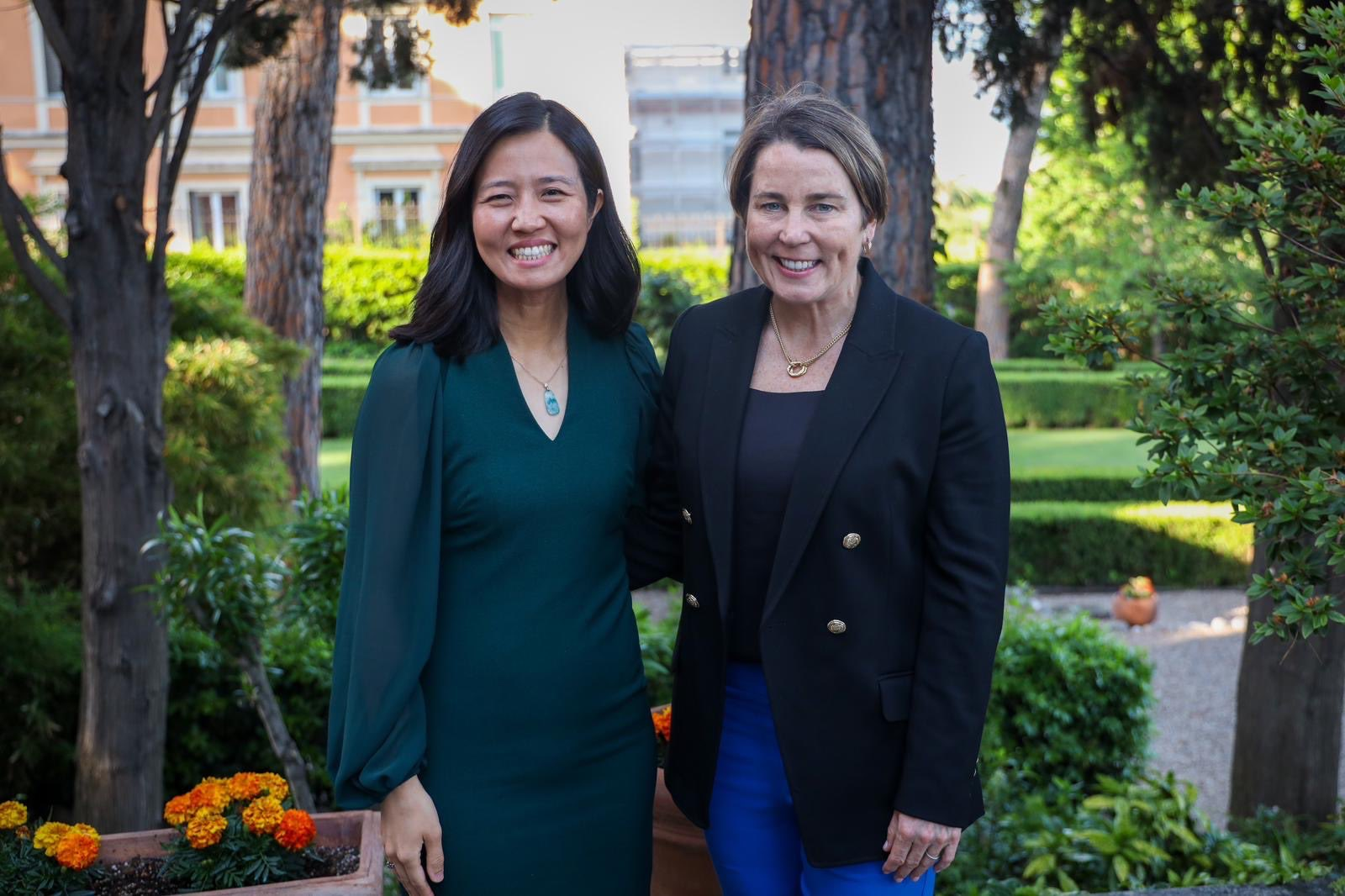
Wu and Massachusetts Governor Maura Healey pose for a photograph during their trip to the 2024 Vatican Climate Conference

In May 2024, Wu attended the Vatican Climate Conference (held at the Vatican City). Wu was the only United States mayor to be a participant at the conference, where she delivered a speech that The Boston Globe characterized as havbing been Wu's "first international address". While in the Vatican City and the city of Rome, Italy (of which the Vatican City is an enclave), Wu also met with Pope Francis and Rome mayor Roberto Gualtieri. This trip marked first diplomatic mission since becoming mayor. Also traveling to the conference with Wu was Massachusetts Governor Maura Healey.

== Decreased use of term "Green New Deal" by Wu ==
While Wu has, over the course of her first term as mayor, made progress on a number of initiatives related to her earlier-published "Green New Deal", Emma Platoff and Niki Griswold of The Boston Globe observed the by early 2025 she had largely ceased using the term "Green New Deal" to refer to this work. However, Platoff and Griswold also observed that many who support environmental causes believed that regardless of this shift in the language used to brand such work, Wu had remained steadfast in her commitment to such issues. Platoff and Griswold quoted Larry Chretien (executive director of Green Energy Consumers Alliance) as remarking that under Wu, "progress is being made in Boston that I don’t see [occurring in other cities]...[Wu is] committed to tangible actions and she's so accessible...[making] herself available to those of us who want her to do more [and not hiding] from us."

== See also ==
- Recognizing the duty of the Federal Government to create a Green New Deal, the proposed federal "Green New Deal" authored by Massachusetts U.S. Senator Ed Markey and New York Congresswoman Alexandria Ocasio-Cortez
