= Red Deal: Indigenous Action to Save Our Earth =

2021 political proposal

- Author: The Red Nation
- Language: English
- Subjects: Indigenous decolonization, ecology, Social movement
- Genre: Political proposal
- Publisher: Common Notions Press
- Publication date: April 2021
- Pages: 176
- ISBN: 9781942173434

The Red Deal is proposed ecological and social movement framework, presented in book format, and published by The Red Nation. The proposals are to supplement the Green New Deal proposals to address climate change. Its full title is The Red Deal: Indigenous Action to Save Our Earth

== Publication ==
The Red Deal was conceptualised by The Red Nation co-founder Nick Estes in 2019. The Red Nation is a Native American advocacy group, based in Albuquerque, New Mexico, that focuses on decolonisation and anti-capitalism as means to liberate Indigenous peoples. It was produced by The Red Nation in April 2021.

The Red Deal is sold as a 176-page paperback book, that is published by Common Notions Press, ISBN 9781942173434.

== Ambitions ==
The Red Deal proposals radically exceed the ambitions of the Green New Deal, presenting a framework to end the climate emergency through actions that centre Indigenous people and traditional territories. The proposals urge the rejection of capitalism and a shift towards left wing governance models. They incorporate The Red Nation's ambition of liberation for Indigenous peoples.

== Synopsis ==
The Red Deal is a short document that presents the view that climate change is a consequence of capitalist colonisation. It presents a framework for decolonizing as a means to tackle environmental harm. It reports on how Indigenous peoples have led climate-related protests at Dooda Desert Rock (2006), Unist’ot’en Camp (2010), the Keystone Pipeline (2011), Idle No More (2012), the Trans Mountain pipeline (2013), Mauna Kea (2014), Oak Flat (2015), Bayou Bridge Pipeline (2017), and on both O’odham land (in 2019) and Kumeyaay land the year later.

The Red Deal proposes collaboration between justice-seeking groups, including the Indigenous Environmental Network. It proposes the return of land that was stolen from Indigenous peoples, and for coexistence of different groups, replacing the current hierarchal system in the United States, which it frames as imperialism. The Red Deal advocates for using modern technology in combination with Indigenous land management and farming practises, including controlled forest burning. To replace capitalist ways of land use, the Red Deal includes proposals such as seed sharing and seed banks. Other elements of the proposal include effective diplomatic relations between different groups, and increased respect for non-human animals.
