= Green New Deal =

Proposed economic stimulus program

- Date: First introduced 2019
- Duration: 10-year mobilization plan
- Venue: United States Congress
- Location: Washington, D.C., United States
- Also known as: GND, H.Res. 109 / S.Res. 59
- Type: Non-binding resolution / Policy framework
- Theme: Climate change mitigation, economic justice, renewable energy
- Cause: Climate crisis, economic inequality, crumbling infrastructure
- Participants: Alexandria Ocasio-Cortez, Ed Markey, Sunrise Movement
- Outcome: Shifted national climate debate; inspired components of later legislation

The Green New Deal (GND) is a conceptual environmentalist movement that calls for public policy to address climate change, along with achieving other social aims like job creation, economic growth, and reducing economic inequality. The name refers to the New Deal, a set of changes and public works projects undertaken by President Franklin D. Roosevelt in 1933–1935 in response to the Great Depression in the United States. The Green New Deal combines Roosevelt's economic approach with modern ideas such as renewable energy and resource efficiency.

Starting in the 2000s and especially since 2019, proposals for a "Green New Deal" have arisen in Europe, the United States, and other parts of the world. The first U.S. politician to run on a Green New Deal platform was Howie Hawkins of the Green Party when he ran for governor of New York in 2010. In her 2012 campaign, Green Party presidential candidate Jill Stein became the first presidential candidate to run on a Green New Deal platform and has continued to do so in each of her campaigns since then. A prominent 2019 attempt to get legislation passed for a Green New Deal was sponsored by Rep. Alexandria Ocasio-Cortez (D-NY) and Sen. Ed Markey (D-MA) during the 116th United States Congress, though it failed to advance in the Senate. In the European Union, a 2019 proposal from the European Commission for a European Green Deal was supported by the European Council and, in January 2020, by the European Parliament as well.

== History ==
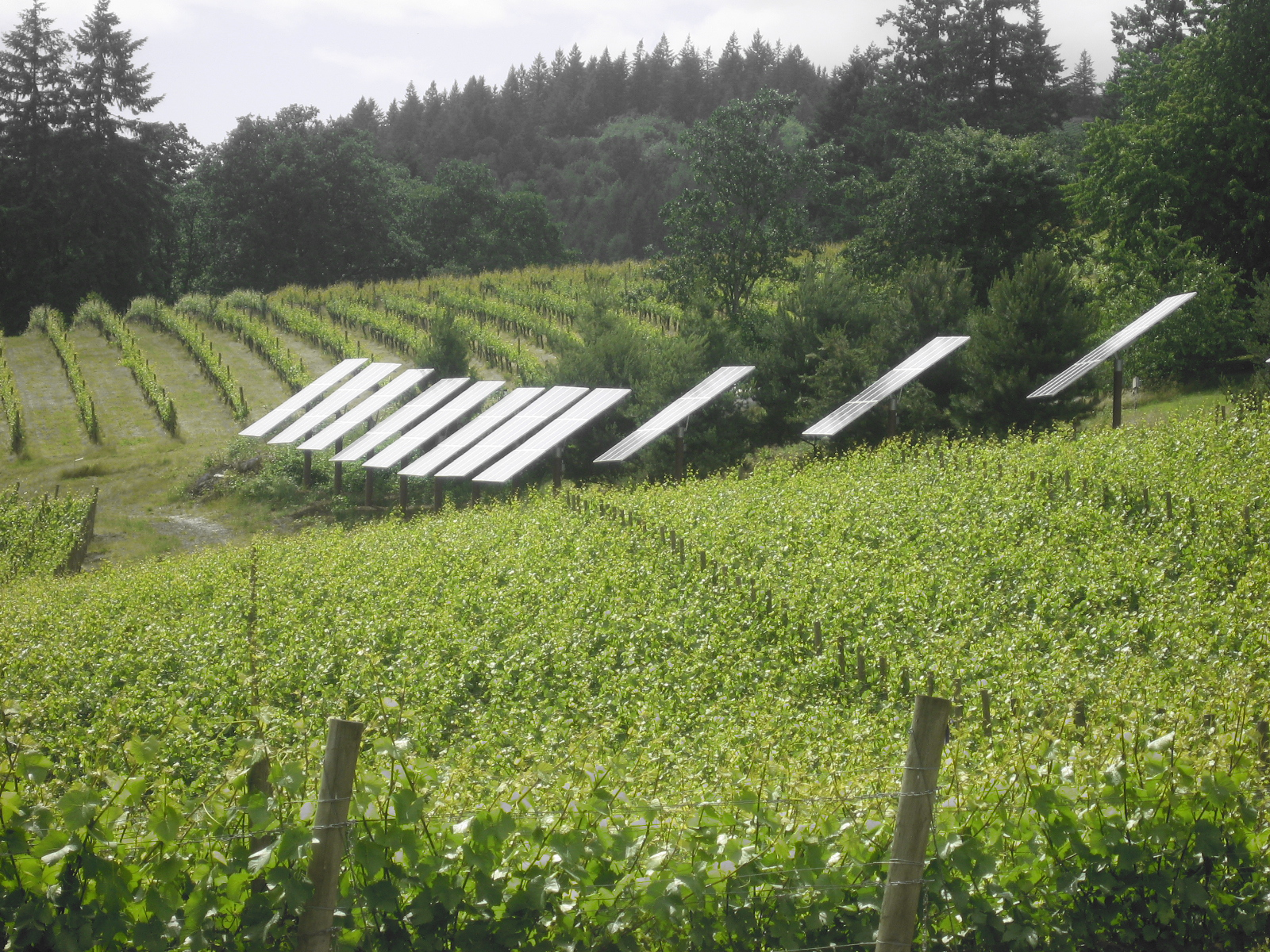
Sustainable agriculture combined with renewable energy generation

Throughout the 1970s and 1990s, an economic policy to move the United States economy away from nonrenewable energy was developed by activists in the labor and the environmental movements. During this period, the concept of green politics emerged as a result of increasing awareness and concern surrounding issues of climate change. The public contended that the US needed to address the climate crisis with a large-scale initiative, similar to the New Deal that was implemented under the Roosevelt administration. This sparked the emergence of various proposals on an international scale, particularly in the UK coalition and the UN Environmental Programme. In the 1980s, the UN promoted the concept of "sustainable development" to frame environmentalism as an economic and social policy, contributing to later efforts by the UK such as the 2008 Climate Change Act. This act was a targeted, preemptive measure against climate change and contributed to a sustainability transition within the US. The Green New Deal ultimately emerged as a result of an increasingly political historical context that was undergoing a sustainability transition.

An early use of the phrase "Green New Deal" was by journalist Thomas Friedman. He argued in favor of the idea in The New York Times and The New York Times Magazine. In January 2007, Friedman wrote:

If you have put a windmill in your yard or some solar panels on your roof, bless your heart. But we will only green the world when we change the very nature of the electricity grid – moving it away from dirty coal or oil to clean coal and renewables. And that is a huge industrial project – much bigger than anyone has told you. Finally, like the New Deal, if we undertake the green version, it has the potential to create a whole new clean power industry to spur our economy into the 21st century.

Friedman expanded upon the idea in his September 2008 book Hot, Flat, and Crowded. This approach was taken up in Britain by the Green New Deal Group, which published its eponymous report on July 21, 2008. The concept was further popularized and put on a wider footing when the United Nations Environment Programme (UNEP) began to promote it internationally.

In early 2008, author Jeff Biggers launched a series of challenges for a Green New Deal from the perspective of his writings from coal country in Appalachia. Biggers wrote that then-presidential-candidate Obama "should shatter these artificial racial boundaries by proposing a New 'Green' Deal to revamp the region and bridge a growing chasm between bitterly divided Democrats, and call for an end to mountaintop removal policies that have led to impoverishment and ruin in the coal fields." Biggers followed up with other Green New Deal proposals over the next four years. While the discussion of the Green New Deal was relevant and widespread during this time, there were limitations to fully implementing it within the context of the Obama campaign. The framework of this initiative was weak, and primarily existed as a response to growing concern surrounding the climate crisis that had been accelerated due to increased reliance on fossil fuel extraction and consumption.

Global carbon dioxide emissions by country in 2023:
1. China (31.8%)
2. United States (14.4%)
3. European Union (4.90%)
4. India (9.50%)
5. Russia (5.80%)
6. Japan (3.50%)
7. Other (30.1%)

In 2009, the economist Edward Barbier authored the United Nations’ Global Green New Deal, which was a strategy for greening the global economic recovery after the Great Recession. He further elaborated on this strategy in a 2010 book. By the 2009 European Parliament election, the European Green Party's manifesto was titled A Green New Deal for Europe and called for:

a Europe of solidarity that can guarantee its citizens a good quality of life based on economic, social, and environmental sustainability; a truly democratic Europe that acts for its citizens and not just narrow industry interests; a Europe that acts for a green future.

The Green Party of the United States and Green Party presidential candidate Jill Stein proposed a "Green New Deal" beginning in 2012. A Green New Deal remains officially part of the platform of the Green Party of the United States.

In late 2018/ early 2019, a series of extreme weather events led to the official "rebirth" of the Green New Deal, reflecting the sense of urgency that reverberated throughout the global population that struggled with addressing the consequences of climate change. The Green New Deal can be considered a product of a broader shift towards environmentalism and action against climate change. According to historian and urban policy specialist Jon Bloomfield, "the Green New Deal was reborn in February 2019 as a package of proposed US legislation linking radical environmental and economic programmes, presented by Democrats Alexandria Ocasio-Cortez and Edward Markey."

=== COVID-19 recovery programs ===
By 2019, international calls for a Green New Deal had already become more prominent. This reflected the popular support the GND had received in the US in late 2018, growing recognition of the global warming threat resulting from recent extreme weather events, the Greta effect and the IPCC 1.5 °C report. In addition to activity within conventional national & multilateral politics, there has been support for a Green New Deal within city diplomacy. In October 2019, the C40 committed to supporting a Global Green New Deal, announcing there will be determined action from all its 94 cities, with 30 cities having already peaked their emissions and progressing rapidly towards net-zero.

There were further proposals to include a GND, both in the US and internationally, in the recovery program for the COVID-19 pandemic. In December 2020, however, the United Nations released a report saying that a high proportion of the world's COVID-19 recovery stimulus was not going towards clean energy. UN secretary-general António Guterres declared the world's governments were "doubling down" on fossil fuels. As of 2021, commentators such as the Council on Foreign Relations have noted that in addition to climate-friendly policies being enacted in the U.S. by Joe Biden, other major economies such as China, India, and the European Union have also begun "implementing some of the policies envisioned by the Green New Deal."

== Environmental justice ==
In the context of the Green New Deal, environmental justice refers to the promotion of policies that recognize historical and ongoing injustices perpetuated against vulnerable populations such as communities of color, Indigenous populations, and low-income communities. Environmental justice also involves advocating for a just energy transition, job development, and the integration of economic policy and equity. Environmental justice is explicitly referenced as a crucial component of the Green New Deal, integrating various principles into its framework. Ensuring that communities of color, low-income populations, and Indigenous peoples are involved and represented within the policy of the Green New Deal is an important aspect of environmental justice. The Green New Deal commits to the equitable distribution of and access to resources, healthcare, and sustainable infrastructure in order to address systemic inequalities.

The 2019 United States congressional resolution Recognizing the duty of the Federal Government to create a Green New Deal introduced by Alexandria Ocasio-Cortez and Ed Markey advocated a "just transition", counteracting previous systemic injustices that had disproportionally hurt vulnerable communities. A “just transition” relies on increasing social and economic equity and access to opportunity which are crucial components of the Green New Deal and principles of environmental and social justice. Specifically, this equitable environmental transition relies on the even distribution of clean energy investments throughout various communities in order to address issues of historic oppression and the exacerbation of environmental damage for vulnerable populations. The integration of multiple sectors and investments in climate mitigation, adaptation, and resilience offers approaches to including climate justice principles in the mission of decarbonization efforts. The central argument is that the Green New Deal for Public Housing offers a persuasive plan for simultaneously addressing inadequate housing, climate threats, and economic injustice that exposes millions of Americans to public health issues. The plan proposes to increase spending to allow for zero-carbon homes to thrive, whether through decarbonization unit upgrades or new homes. Experts argue that through these methods, we could eliminate approximately 5.7 million metric tonnes of carbon emissions, which is equivalent to 1.26 million fewer cars.

A 2021 academic paper led by climate policy scholar Alaina Kinol states that "all the GND proposals dedicate space in the introduction to reference research on historic environmental, economic, and social injustices that relate to climate and jobs investments." The preservation of public lands and resources, emphasis on community-led decision-making, and development of affordable healthcare, housing, and clean environments throughout various communities connects the Green New Deals to principles of environmental justice.

AOC, who was heavily involved in the rebirth of the Green New Deal, specifically emphasized respecting Indigenous sovereignty and gaining the consent of these communities in respect to use their land for development and extraction. In this sense, environmental justice is emphasized by considering how clean energy developments will and should benefit marginalized communities. This furthers the concept of procedural justice through the Green New Deal in which communities historically excluded from crucial decision-making processes that directly impact these groups have the opportunity to contribute to such discussions.

== Australia ==
The Australian Greens have advocated for a "Green Plan", similar to the Green New Deal, since 2009. Deputy leader Christine Milne discussed the idea on the ABC's panel discussion program Q&A on February 19, 2009, and it was the subject of a major national conference of the Australian Greens in 2009.

== Canada ==
In early May 2019, with rising concerns about the need for urgent global environmental action to reduce potentially catastrophic effects of climate change, a non-partisan coalition of nearly 70 groups launched the Pact for a Green New Deal (New Deal vert au Canada in French). With press conferences in Montreal, Toronto, and Vancouver, the coalition called for fossil fuel emissions to be halved by 2030. On May 16, 2019, the Green Party released a 5-page summary of their plan entitled "Mission: Possible: The Green Climate Action Plan".

In 2026, Avi Lewis, Leader of the New Democratic Party, proposed the implementation of a Green New Deal as a core part of his platform for leadership election.

== European Union ==
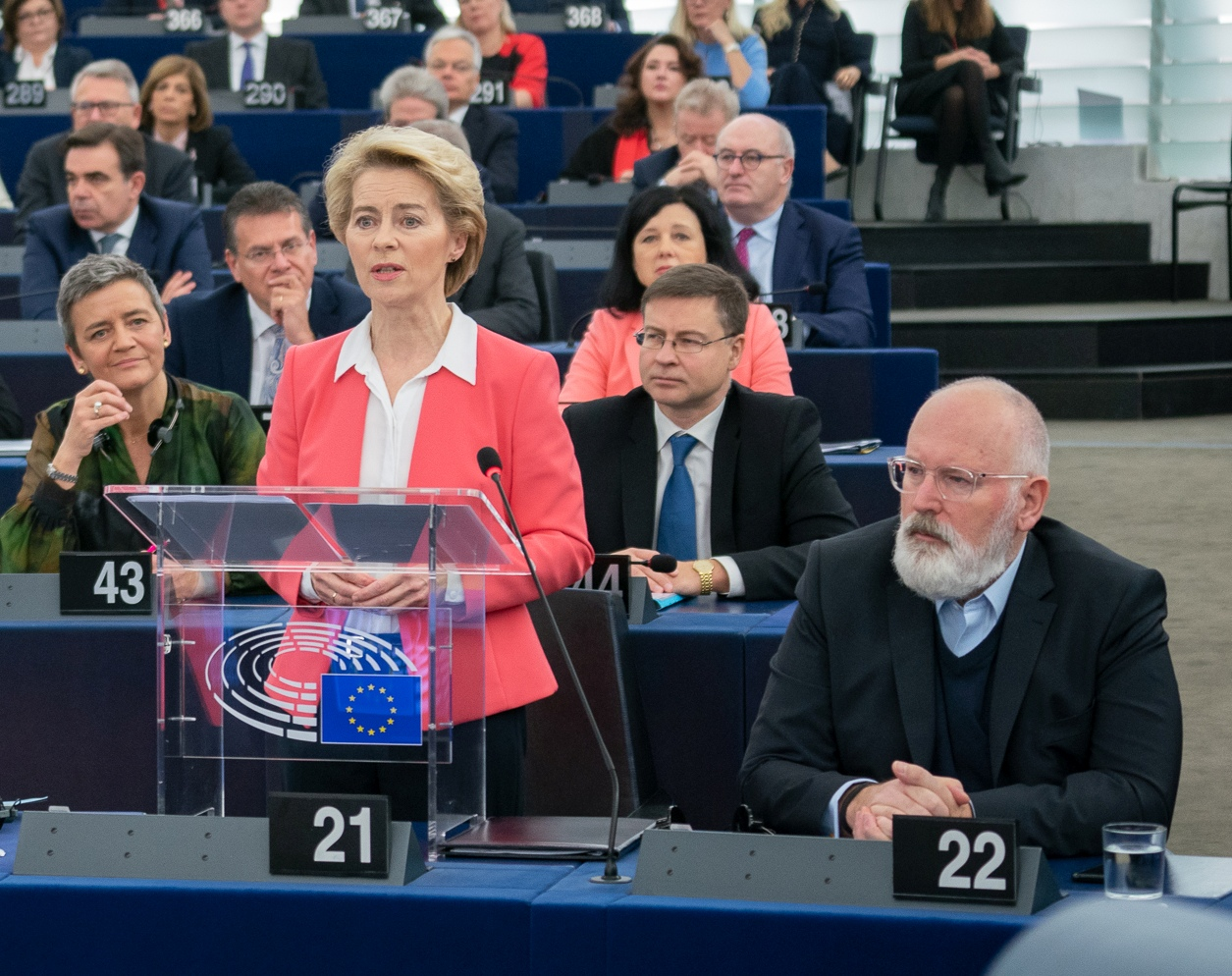
Ursula von der Leyen and Frans Timmermans in 2019

On continental Europe, the European Spring coalition campaigned under the banner of a "Green New Deal" for the 2019 EU elections. In December 2019, the newly elected European Commission under Von der Leyen presented a set of policy proposals under the name European Green Deal. Compared to the United States plan, it has a less ambitious decarbonisation timeline, with an aim of carbon neutrality in 2050. The policy proposal involves every sector in the economy and the option of a border adjustment mechanism, a 'carbon tariff', is on the table to prevent carbon leakage from outside countries.

A pilot program for a four-day workweek, under development by Spain's Valencian Regional Government, has been described as a "helpful counter to ... fearmongering about the bleak, hamburger-free world climate activists are allegedly plotting to create with a Green New Deal."

In April 2020 the European Parliament called to include the European Green Deal in the recovery program from the COVID-19 pandemic.

The proposals were criticised for falling short of the goal of ending fossil fuels, or being sufficient for a green recovery after the COVID-19 pandemic. In its place, it has been proposed that the EU enacts a "Green New Deal for Europe", which includes more investment, and changes the legal regulation that enables global warming from coal, oil, and gas to continue.

In July 2021, the European Commission released its "Fit for 55" legislation package, which contains important guidelines for the future of the automotive industry; all new cars on the European market must be zero-emission vehicles from 2035. According to European Commissioner for Climate Action Frans Timmermans, "the best answer" to the 2021 global energy crisis is "to reduce our reliance on fossil fuels." ETS2 is the new EU Emissions Trading System that will enter into force in 2027 and, for the first time in history, will set a price for CO2 emissions from fuels used in the building and road transport sectors.

== South Korea ==
In 2020, after the Democratic Party won an absolute majority in the National Assembly, the leadership of the country began to advance a Green New Deal. It includes:

- Achieving carbon neutrality by 2050. South Korea is the first country in east Asia committing to this target.
- Expanding investments in renewable energy.
- Stopping investments in coal in the country and outside it.
- Establishing a carbon tax.
- Creating a Regional Energy Transition Centre to ensure that the coal workers will not suffer and will be transitioned to green jobs.

== United Kingdom ==
In the UK, the Green New Deal Group and the New Economics Foundation produced the A Green New Deal report asking for a Green New Deal as a way out of the Great Recession, demanding a reform of the financial and tax sectors and a revolution of the energy sector in the country. Also, Green MP for Brighton Pavilion, Caroline Lucas, raised the idea during an economic debate in 2008.

In March 2019, Labour Party members launched a grassroots campaign called Labour for a Green New Deal. The aim of the group is to push the party to adopt a radical Green New Deal to transform the UK economy, tackle inequality and address the escalating climate crisis. It also wants a region-specific green jobs guarantee, a significant expansion of public ownership and democratic control of industry, as well as mass investment in public infrastructure. The group states that they got their inspiration from the Sunrise Movement and the work that congresswoman Alexandria Ocasio-Cortez has done in the US. Group members have met with Zack Exley, co-founder of the progressive group Justice Democrats, to learn from the experiences that he and Ocasio-Cortez have had in working for the Green New Deal campaign in the US.

On April 30, former Labour Party leader Ed Miliband joined Caroline Lucas and former South Thanet Conservative MP Laura Sandys in calling for a Green New Deal in the UK. The left-wing campaigning group Momentum also wish to influence the Labour Party's manifesto to include a Green New Deal.

In September 2019, the Labour party committed to a Green New Deal at its 2019 annual conference. This included a target to decarbonise by 2030. Polling undertook by YouGov in late October 2019 found that 56% of British adults support the goal of making the UK carbon neutral by 2030 or earlier.

In July 2020, while the UK government promised a "green recovery" from the COVID-19 pandemic, this was criticised as being insufficient, and lacking changes to regulation that enabled coal, oil, and gas pollution to continue. An alternative "Green Recovery Act", widely endorsed by politicians and the media, was published by an academic and think tank group that would target nine fields of law reform, on transport, energy generation, agriculture, fossil fuels, local government, international agreement, finance and corporate governance, employment, and investment. This has the goal of establishing duties on all public bodies and regulators to end use of all coal, oil and gas "as fast as technologically practicable", with strict exceptions if there are not yet technical alternatives.

== United States ==
=== Early efforts ===
In 2006, a Green New Deal was created by the Green New Deal Task Force as a plan for one hundred percent clean, renewable energy by 2030 utilizing a carbon tax, a jobs guarantee, free college, single-payer healthcare, and a focus on using public programs.

Since 2006, the Green New Deal has been included in the platforms of multiple Green Party candidates, such as Howie Hawkins' gubernatorial campaigns in 2010, 2014, and 2018, and Jill Stein's 2012 and 2016 presidential campaigns.

In the 2014 Congressional race in California, Independent candidate for CA-33 and author Marianne Williamson endorsed the Green New Deal in her campaign platform.

=== The Rep. Ocasio-Cortez and Sen. Markey Green New Deal ===
==== Background ====
A "Green New Deal" wing began to emerge in the Democratic Party after the November 2018 elections. A possible program in 2018 for a "Green New Deal" assembled by the think tank Data for Progress was described as "pairing labor programs with measures to combat the climate crisis."

A November 2018 article in Vogue stated, "There isn't just one Green New Deal yet. For now, it's a platform position that some candidates are taking to indicate that they want the American government to devote the country to preparing for climate change as fully as Franklin Delano Roosevelt once did to reinvigorating the economy after the Great Depression."

A week after the 2018 midterm elections, climate justice group Sunrise Movement organized a protest in Nancy Pelosi's office calling on Pelosi to support a Green New Deal. On the same day, freshman congresswoman Alexandria Ocasio-Cortez launched a resolution to create a committee on the Green New Deal. Following this, several candidates came out supporting a "Green New Deal", including Deb Haaland, Rashida Tlaib, Ilhan Omar, and Antonio Delgado. They were joined in the following weeks by Reps. John Lewis, Earl Blumenauer, Carolyn Maloney, and José Serrano.

By the end of November, eighteen Democratic members of Congress were co-sponsoring a proposed House Select Committee on a Green New Deal, and incoming representatives Ayanna Pressley and Joe Neguse had announced their support. Draft text would task this committee with a "'detailed national, industrial, economic mobilization plan' capable of making the U.S. economy 'carbon neutral' while promoting 'economic and environmental justice and equality,'" to be released in early 2020, with draft legislation for implementation within 90 days.

Organizations supporting a Green New Deal initiative include the Sunrise Movement, 350.org, Greenpeace, Sierra Club, Extinction Rebellion and Friends of the Earth.

A Sunrise Movement protest on behalf of a Green New Deal at the Capitol Hill offices of Nancy Pelosi and Steny Hoyer on December 10, 2018, featured Lennox Yearwood and speakers as young as age 7, resulting in 143 arrests. Euronews, the pan-European TV network, displayed video of youth with signs saying "Green New Deal," "No excuses", and "Do your job" in its "No Comment" section.

On December 14, 2018, a group of over 300 local elected officials from 40 states issued a letter endorsing a Green New Deal approach. That same day, a poll released by Yale Program on Climate Change Communication indicated that although 82% of registered voters had not heard of the "Green New Deal," it had strong bi-partisan support among voters. A non-partisan description of the general concepts behind a Green New Deal resulted in 40% of respondents saying they "strongly support", and 41% saying they "somewhat support" the idea.

On January 10, 2019, over 600 organizations submitted a letter to Congress declaring support for policies to reduce greenhouse gas emissions. This includes phasing out fossil fuel extraction and ending fossil fuel subsidies, transitioning to 100% clean renewable energy by 2035, expanding public transportation, and strict emission reductions rather than reliance on carbon emission trading.

==== Green New Deal Resolution ====
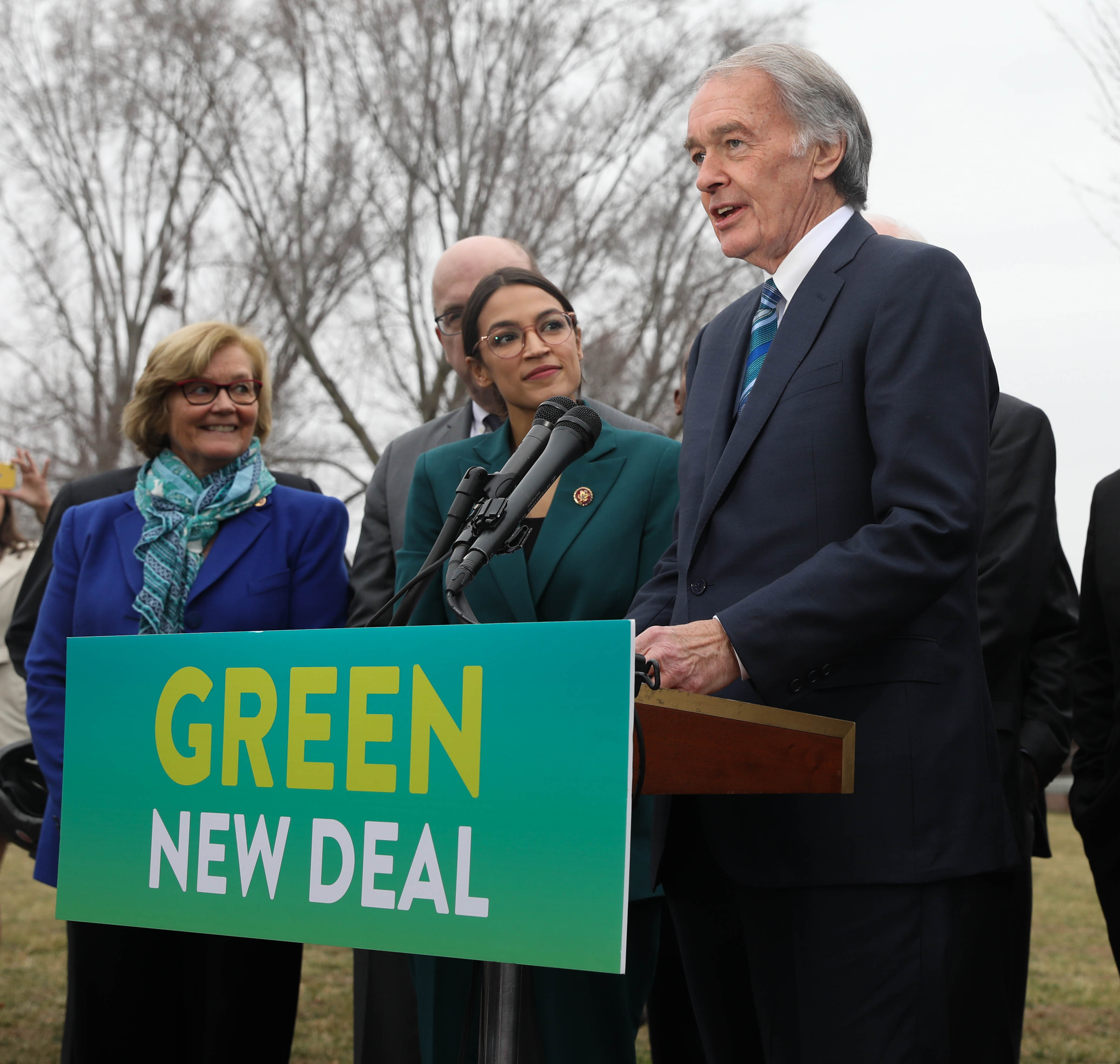
Ed Markey speaks on a Green New Deal in front of the Capitol Building in February 2019.

On February 7, 2019, Representative Alexandria Ocasio-Cortez and Senator Edward Markey released a fourteen-page resolution for their Green New Deal (House Resolution 109, closely related to S. Res. 59). Their proposal advocated transitioning the United States to 100% renewable, zero-emission energy sources, along with investment in electric cars and high-speed rail systems, and implementing the "social cost of carbon" that had been part of the Obama administration's plan for addressing climate change within 10 years. Besides increasing state-sponsored jobs, this Green New Deal also sought to address poverty by aiming much of the improvements in "frontline and vulnerable communities" which include poor and disadvantaged people. The resolution included calls for universal health care, increased minimum wages, and preventing monopolies.

According to The Washington Post (February 11, 2019), the resolution called for a "10-year national mobilization" whose primary goals would be:

"Guaranteeing a job with a family-sustaining wage, adequate family and medical leave, paid vacations, and retirement security to all people of the United States."
"Providing all people of the United States with – (i) high-quality health care; (ii) affordable, safe, and adequate housing; (iii) economic security; and (iv) access to clean water, clean air, healthy and affordable food, and nature."
"Providing resources, training, and high-quality education, including higher education, to all people of the United States."
"Meeting 100 percent of the power demand in the United States through clean, renewable, and zero-emission energy sources."
"Repairing and upgrading the infrastructure in the United States, including . . . by eliminating pollution and greenhouse gas emissions as much as technologically feasible."
"Building or upgrading to energy-efficient, distributed, and 'smart' power grids, and working to ensure affordable access to electricity."
"Upgrading all existing buildings in the United States and building new buildings to achieve maximal energy efficiency, water efficiency, safety, affordability, comfort, and durability, including through electrification."
"Overhauling transportation systems in the United States to eliminate pollution and greenhouse gas emissions from the transportation sector as much as is technologically feasible, including through investment in – (i) zero-emission vehicle infrastructure and manufacturing; (ii) clean, affordable, and accessible public transportation; and (iii) high-speed rail."
"Spurring massive growth in clean manufacturing in the United States and removing pollution and greenhouse gas emissions from manufacturing and industry as much as is technologically feasible."
"Working collaboratively with farmers and ranchers in the United States to eliminate pollution and greenhouse gas emissions from the agricultural sector as much as is technologically feasible."

==== House Select Committee on the Climate Crisis ====
Various perspectives emerged in late 2018 as to whether to form a committee dedicated to climate, what powers such a committee might be granted, and whether the committee would be specifically tasked with developing a Green New Deal.

Incoming House committee chairs Frank Pallone and Peter DeFazio indicated a preference for handling these matters in the House Energy and Commerce Committee and the House Transportation and Infrastructure Committee. Congressman Pallone has committed to the development of renewable fuel storage and “more federal funding to help offset the lack of investment from the private sector in electricity storage research, development, and demonstration” and the need to develop a “federal energy storage roadmap, similar to those established by some states, in order to increase coordination among the various private initiatives, the national labs, and other federal agencies.”

In contrast, Representative Ro Khanna thought that creating a Select Committee specifically dedicated to a Green New Deal would be a "very commonsense idea", based on the recent example of the Select Committee on Energy Independence and Global Warming (2007–2011), which had proven effective in developing a 2009 bill for cap-and-trade legislation.

Proposals for the House Select Committee on the Climate Crisis did not contain "Green New Deal" language and lacked the powers desired by Green New Deal proponents, such as the ability to subpoena documents or depose witnesses.

Representative Kathy Castor of Florida was appointed to chair the committee.

==== January 2019 letter to Congress from environmental groups ====
On January 10, 2019, a letter signed by 626 organizations in support of a Green New Deal was sent to all members of Congress. It called for measures such as "an expansion of the Clean Air Act; a ban on crude oil exports; an end to fossil fuel subsidies and fossil fuel leasing; and a phase-out of all gasoline-powered vehicles by 2040."

The letter also indicated that signatories would "vigorously oppose ... market-based mechanisms and technology options such as carbon and emissions trading and offsets, carbon capture and storage, nuclear power, waste-to-energy and biomass energy."

Six major environmental groups did not sign on to the letter: the Sierra Club, the Natural Resources Defense Council, the Environmental Defense Fund, Mom's Clean Air Force, Environment America, and the Audubon Society.

An article in The Atlantic quoted Greg Carlock, who prepared "a different Green New Deal plan for the left-wing think tank Data for Progress" as responding, "There is no scenario produced by the IPCC or the UN where we hit mid-century decarbonization without some kind of carbon capture."

The MIT Technology Review responded to the letter with an article titled, "Let's Keep the Green New Deal Grounded in Science". The MIT article states that, although the letter refers to the "rapid and aggressive action" needed to prevent the 1.5 ˚C of warming specified in the UN climate panel's latest report, simply acknowledging the report's recommendation is not sufficient. If the letter's signatories start from a position where the options of carbon pricing, carbon capture for fossil plants, hydropower, and nuclear power, are not even on the table for consideration, there may be no feasible technical means to reach the necessary 1.5 ˚C climate goal.

A report in Axios suggested that the letter's omission of a carbon tax, which has been supported by moderate Republicans, did not mean that signatories would oppose carbon pricing.

The Director of the Center for Science, Technology, and Innovation Policy at George Mason University was quoted as saying, "As long as organizations hold onto a rigid set of ideas about what the solution is, it's going to be hard to make progress ... And that's what worries me."

==== Criticism ====
Many who support some goals of the Green New Deal express doubt about feasibility of one or more of its parts. John P. Holdren, former science advisor to Obama, thinks the 2030 goal is too optimistic, saying that 2045 or 2050 would be more realistic.

Many members of the Green party have also attacked the plan due to its cutting of multiple parts of their plan, such as the elimination of nuclear power and jobs guarantee, and the changing of the goal from a one hundred percent clean, renewable energy economy by 2030 to the elimination of the U.S. carbon footprint by 2030.

Paul Bledsoe of the Progressive Policy Institute, the think tank affiliated with the Democratic Leadership Council, expressed concern that setting unrealistic "aspirational" goals of 100% renewable energy could undermine "the credibility of the effort" against climate change.

Economist Edward Barbier, who developed the "Global Green New Deal" proposal for the United Nations Environment Programme in 2009, opposes "a massive federal jobs program," saying "The government would end up doing more and more of what the private sector and industry should be doing." Barbier prefers carbon pricing, such as a carbon tax or cap-and-trade system, in order to "address distortions in the economy that are holding back private sector innovation and investments in clean energy."

When Senator Dianne Feinstein (D-CA) was confronted by youth associated with the Sunrise Movement on why she does not support the Green New Deal, she told them "there's no way to pay for it" and that it could not pass a Republican-controlled Senate. In a tweet following the confrontation, Feinstein said that she remains committed "to enact real, meaningful climate change legislation." According to Bloomberg Businessweek, Wall Street is willing to invest significant resources toward GND programs, but not unless Congress commits to moving it forward.

The AFL–CIO, in a letter to Ocasio-Cortez, expressed strong reservations about the GND, saying, "We welcome the call for labor rights and dialogue with labor, but the Green New Deal resolution is far too short on specific solutions that speak to the jobs of our members and the critical sections of our economy."

In an op-ed for Slate, Alex Baca criticizes the Green New Deal for failing to address the environmental, economic, and social consequences of urban sprawl. Adam Millsap criticizes the GND's overreliance on public transit to make cities more environmentally friendly, since public transit integrates better in monocentric cities than in polycentric ones. He suggests land use reforms to increase density, congestion pricing, and eliminating parking requirements as measures that can be applied more flexibly to cities with monocentric and polycentric layouts.

Although the Green New Deal is often presented as a left-wing proposal, criticism of it has come from left-wing commentators who have argued that the Green New Deal fails to tackle the real cause of the climate emergency, namely the concept of unending growth and consumption inherent in capitalism, and is instead an attempt to greenwash capitalism. Left wing critics of the Green New Deal argue that it is not the monetization of Green policies and practices within capitalism that are necessary, but an anti-capitalist adoption of policies for de-growth.

Similar criticisms, particularly held by indigenous communities, have been expressed in terms of the potential for “green colonialism” under the Green New Deal. The negative repercussions of the development and promotion of clean technology to reduce carbon emissions will particularly affect Global South nations, perpetuating ideals of colonial dispossession in the name of decarbonization. Rather than addressing the underlying systemic roots of environmental degradation and climate change, these communities argue that the prioritization of the development of clean technology may restructure the problem and inflict environmental burden on other global nations. Indigenous concern regarding the Green New Deal’s potential to further “Eurocentric and techno optimistic character of mainstream green capitalism” suggests the need for reparations, structural reform, sovereignty, and self-determination for all people, particularly these indigenous communities

==== Supporters ====
In September 2019, Naomi Klein published On Fire: The (Burning) Case for a Green New Deal. On Fire is a collection of essays focusing on climate change and the urgent actions needed to preserve the planet. Klein relates her meeting with Greta Thunberg in the opening essay in which she discusses the entrance of young people into those speaking out for climate awareness and change. She supports the Green New Deal throughout the book and in the final essay she discusses the 2020 U.S. election saying "The stakes of the election are almost unbearably high. It's why I wrote the book and decided to put it out now and why I'll be doing whatever I can to help push people toward supporting a candidate with the most ambitious Green New Deal platform—so that they win the primaries and then the general."

Former vice presidents

- Al Gore

Individuals

- Mike Gravel, former US Senator from Alaska and candidate in the 2020 Democratic Party presidential primaries
- Howie Hawkins, Green party co-founder and first American political candidate to run on the promise of a Green New Deal
- Paul Krugman, Nobel laureate in economics, professor at the Graduate Center of the City University of New York, and a columnist for The New York Times
- Bill Maher, comedian, political commentator, and television host
- Jill Stein, former Green party presidential candidate in 2012 and 2016
- Joseph Stiglitz, Nobel laureate in economics, professor at Columbia University, and chief economist of the Roosevelt Institute.
- Bria Vinaite recorded a "Green New Deal" video for Vogue Magazine in 2018
- Marianne Williamson, candidate in the 2020 Democratic Party presidential primaries
- Andrew Yang, candidate in the 2020 Democratic Party presidential primaries

Senators

- Richard Blumenthal US Senator from Connecticut
- Cory Booker, US Senator from New Jersey
- Kirsten Gillibrand, US Senator from New York
- Martin Heinrich, US Senator from New Mexico
- Mazie Hirono, US Senator from Hawaii
- Amy Klobuchar, US Senator from Minnesota
- Ed Markey, US Senator from Massachusetts
- Jeff Merkley, US Senator from Oregon
- Bernie Sanders, US Senator from Vermont, Ranking Member of the Senate Budget Committee
- Tom Udall, US Senator from New Mexico
- Chris Van Hollen, US Senator from Maryland
- Elizabeth Warren, US Senator from Massachusetts
- Ron Wyden, US Senator from Oregon

Representatives

- Karen Bass, US Representative from California's 37th congressional district.
- Earl Blumenauer, US Representative from Oregon's 3rd congressional district.
- Suzanne Bonamici, US Representative from Oregon's 1st congressional district.
- Salud Carbajal, US Representative from California's 24th congressional district.
- David Cicilline, US Representative from Rhode Island's 1st congressional district.
- Katherine Clark, Vice Chair of the House Democratic Caucus and US Representative from Massachusetts's 5th congressional district.
- Bonnie Watson Coleman, US Representative from New Jersey's 12th congressional district.
- Gerry Connolly, US Representative from Virginia's 11th congressional district.
- Susan Davis, US Representative from California's 53rd congressional district.
- Peter DeFazio, Chair of the House Transportation Committee and US Representative from Oregon's 4th congressional district.
- Rosa DeLauro, US Representative from Connecticut's 3rd congressional district.
- Lloyd Doggett, US Representative from Texas 35th congressional district.
- Eliot Engel, Chairman of the House Foreign Affairs Committee and US Representative from New York's 16th congressional district.
- Veronica Escobar, US Representative from Texas 16th congressional district.
- Anna Eshoo, US Representative from California's 18th congressional district.
- Adriano Espaillat, US Representative from New York's 13th congressional district.
- John Garamendi, US Representative from California's 3rd congressional district.
- Jesús "Chuy" García, US Representative from Illinois's 4th congressional district.
- Dan Goldman, US Representative from New York's 10th congressional district.
- Jimmy Gomez, US Representative from California's 34th congressional district.
- Raúl Grijalva, Chair of the House Natural Resources Committee and US Representative from Arizona's 3rd congressional district.
- Deb Haaland, US Representative from New Mexico's 1st congressional district.
- Jahana Hayes, US Representative from Connecticut's 5th congressional district.
- Jared Huffman, US Representative from California's 2nd congressional district.
- Pramila Jayapal, US Representative from Washington's 7th congressional district.
- Bill Keating (politician), US Representative from Massachusetts's 9th congressional district.
- Joe Kennedy III, US Representative from Massachusetts's 4th congressional district and 2020 US Senate candidate.
- Ro Khanna, US Representative from California's 17th congressional district.
- John Larson, US Representative from Connecticut's 1st congressional district.
- Barbara Lee, US Representative from California's 13th congressional district.
- Andy Levin, US Representative from Michigan's 9th congressional district.
- Mike Levin, US Representative from California's 49th congressional district.
- Nita Lowey, Chair of the House Appropriations Committee and US Representative from New York's 17th congressional district.
- Ben Ray Luján, Assistant Speaker of the US Representative from New Mexico's 1st congressional district and 2020 candidate for US Senate.
- Carolyn Maloney, US Representative from New York's 12th congressional district.
- Sean Patrick Maloney, US Representative from New York's 18th congressional district.
- Betty McCollum, US Representative from Minnesota's 4th congressional district.
- James McGovern, Chair of the House Rules Committee and US Representative from Massachusetts's 2nd congressional district.
- Seth Moulton, US Representative from Massachusetts' 6th congressional district and former 2020 Presidential candidate.
- Grace Napolitano, US Representative from California's 32nd congressional district.
- Joe Neguse, US Representative from Colorado's 2nd congressional district.
- Alexandria Ocasio-Cortez, US Representative from New York's 14th congressional district.
- Beto O'Rourke, former US Representative From Texas 16th congressional district, 2018 US Senate Nominee in Texas.
- Bill Pascrell, US Representative from New Jersey's 9th congressional district.
- Chellie Pingree, US Representative from Maine's 1st congressional district.
- Mark Pocan, Co-Chair of the Congressional Progressive Caucus and US Representative from Wisconsin's 2nd congressional district.
- Ayanna Pressley, US Representative from Massachusetts's 7th congressional district.
- Mike Quigley, US Representative from Illinois's 5th congressional district.
- Jamie Raskin, US Representative from Maryland 8th congressional district.
- Dutch Ruppersberger, US Representative from Maryland's 2nd congressional district.
- Gregorio Sablan, Delegate to the US House of Representatives from the Northern Mariana Islands' at-large district.
- John Sarbanes, US Representative from Maryland's 3rd congressional district.
- Janice Schakowsky, US Representative from Illinois 9th congressional district.
- Bobby Scott (politician), Chair of the House Education and Labor Committee and US Representative from Virginia's 3rd congressional district.
- Brad Sherman, US Representative from California's 30th congressional district.
- Adam Smith, Chair of the House Armed Services Committee and US Representative from Washington's 9th congressional district.
- Thomas Suozzi, US Representative from New York's 3rd congressional district.
- Mike Thompson, US Representative from California's 5th congressional district.
- Rashida Tlaib, US Representative from Michigan's 13th congressional district.
- Lori Trahan, US Representative from Massachusetts's 3rd congressional district.
- Juan Vargas, US Representative from California's 51st congressional district.
- Peter Welch, US Representative from Vermont At Large.

Governors

- Andrew Cuomo, while he was Governor of New York.
- Jay Inslee, Governor of Washington
- Michelle Lujan Grisham, Governor of New Mexico.
- Janet Mills, Governor of Maine.

Mayors

- Bill De Blasio, Mayor of New York City and former 2020 Presidential candidate
- Wayne Messam, Mayor of Miramar, Florida
- Michelle Wu, Mayor of Boston see Boston Green New Deal
- Eric Garcetti, former Mayor of Los Angeles see Los Angeles Green New Deal

Organizations

- The Climate Mobilization, which advocates a "World War II-scale economic mobilization to restore a safe climate."
- The Democracy in Europe Movement 2025 (DieM25), a pan-European political activist group of over 100.000 members for progressive EU and global economics policy, founded by Yanis Varoufakis
- The European Green Party and The Greens–European Free Alliance campaigned on the Green New Deal in the 2009 European Parliament election and maintain an ongoing European "Green New Deal" campaign
- The Global Greens support a Global Green New Deal.
- Green Party of the United States has endorsed the Green New Deal in its party platform.
- The Heinrich Böll Foundation published proposals for a Green New Deal in Germany, the European Union, as well as North America, Israel, and Ukraine.
- The League of Conservation Voters is an American advocacy group for environmental issues
- The New Economics Foundation and The Green New Deal Group (United Kingdom)
- openDemocracy
- Sierra Club Living Economy Program
- The United Nations Economic and Social Commission for Asia and the Pacific, who developed the Low Carbon Green Growth Roadmap for Asia and the Pacific
- The United Nations Environment Programme launched a Green Economy Initiative known as the "Global Green New Deal".
- The Global Marshall Plan Initiative advocates for a sustainable global economy

==== Detractors ====
Individuals

- On February 9, 2019, United States President Donald Trump voiced his opposition using sarcasm via Twitter as follows: "I think it is very important for the Democrats to press forward with their Green New Deal. It would be great for the so-called "Carbon Footprint" to permanently eliminate all Planes, Cars, Cows, Oil, Gas & the Military – even if no other country would do the same. Brilliant!"
- Democratic Senator Dianne Feinstein objected to the plan saying "there's no way to pay for it" and is drafting her own narrowed down version. Democratic Senator Joe Manchin criticized the plan as a "dream" adding that 'it would hurt regions dependent on reliable, affordable energy."
- Republican White House aide Sebastian Gorka has referred to the deal as "what Stalin dreamed about but never achieved" and that "they [proponents of the deal] want to take your pickup truck. They want to rebuild your home. They want to take away your hamburgers." The comments about hamburgers are a common criticism of the deal by conservatives, who have gone on to criticize Representative Ocasio-Cortez for allowing her chief of staff to eat a hamburger with her at a Washington restaurant.
- On February 13, 2019, Rep. Mark Walker (R-NC) released a parody video on his verified Twitter account comparing the Green New Deal to the failed Fyre Festival, using the hashtag #GNDisFyre.
- On March 14, 2019, Rep. Rob Bishop, a Republican representing Utah's 1st congressional district, said that the legislation was "tantamount to genocide," adding shortly afterward that his comment was "maybe an overstatement, but not by a lot."
- During a Fox Business interview on August 13, 2020, President Donald Trump again voiced his opposition, declaring that adopting the Green New Deal would result in demolishing the Empire State Building and abolishing all animals.

==== Legislative outcome ====
On March 26, in what Democrats called a "stunt," Republicans called for an early vote on the resolution without allowing discussion or expert testimony. In protest, 42 Democrats and one Independent who caucuses with Democrats voted "present" resulting in a 57–0 defeat on the Senate floor. Three Democrats and one Independent who caucuses with Democrats voted against the bill, while the other votes were along party lines.

==== 2020 presidential campaign ====
Howie Hawkins, the Green Party's 2020 presidential candidate, ran on a Green New Deal platform calling for the U.S. to reach zero greenhouse emissions and 100% clean energy by 2030.

Democratic Party presidential candidate and president-elect Joe Biden has declined to endorse the full Green New Deal plan proposed by members of his party, but he has promised to increase generation of renewable energy, transition to more energy efficient buildings and increase fuel efficiency standards for automobiles. The joint policy proposals developed by the Biden and Sanders campaigns, which were released on July 8, 2020, do not include a Green New Deal.

=== The Biden climate plan ===
In 2021, commentators noted that early climate-related executive actions by President Biden, such as re-joining the Paris Agreement, have much in common with the 2019 GND proposed by Rep. Ocasio-Cortez and Sen. Markey. According to Mike Krancer, while he sees the Biden Plan For A Clean Energy Revolution And Environmental Justice and the 2019 proposal as very similar, a key difference is that the Biden plan includes a prominent role for carbon capture and storage technology. President Biden's infrastructure package, which pledges to halve 2005 U.S. greenhouse gas emissions levels by 2030, has been criticized by progressives, including Rep. Ocasio-Cortez, as not being ambitious enough to achieve the scale required to mitigate climate change. Biden's climate plan is incorporated in his American Jobs Plan and American Families Plan, which would in part lead to the creation of a Civilian Climate Corps modeled after the Civilian Conservation Corps.

In August 2022, President Joe Biden signed into law the Inflation Reduction Act, which contains the largest climate investment by the U.S. federal government in history.

=== 2021 reintroduction ===
On April 20, 2021, Rep. Ocasio-Cortez, Sen. Markey and fellow Democratic lawmakers reintroduced the Green New Deal Resolution at the National Mall. The resolution reaffirms the threat produced by climate change and the responsibility of the US to recommit to meeting the emission goals outlined by the Intergovernmental Panel on Climate Change.

=== The Red Deal ===
In April 2021, The Red Nation Indigenous advocacy group released the Red Deal. The Red Deal is a proposal designed to supplement the Green New Deal, and incorporates a range of anti-capitalism and Indigenous decolonisation proposals designed to halt climate change.

The framework of the Red Deal relies on an understanding of climate change as intrinsically connected to colonization and capitalist economics. According to the Red Deal, an American history of imperialism and industrial development has led to an excessive and destructive reliance on the Earth’s natural resources which must be countered by reevaluating these systems and their modern implications. The Red Deal operates under an anti-capitalist framework, addressing root causes of environmental injustice and other interrelated areas such as prison abolition, demilitarization, Indigenous treaty rights, land restoration, sovereignty, self-determination, decolonization, and liberation. These areas of focus criticize extractive processes and violence that limit the sovereignty of Indigenous peoples and marginalized communities.

Framers of the Red Deal call for revolutionary resistance that involves caretaking and responsibility of human and non-human relations. It involves a collaborative effort, addressing various communities such as indigenous and nonindigenous people, activists, scholars, and those seeking to develop an understanding of anticolonial and anticapitalistic environmentalism. This framework extends the vision of the Green New Deal by centering indigenous movements against capitalism and colonialism as crucial to the mission of the Green New Deal.

This proposal centers indigenous perspective and insight to facilitate environmental justice which is a core principle of the Green New Deal. It focuses on the concept of Indigeneity which recognizes the unique perspectives and experiences that have shaped indigenous relationship with the land, centering indigenous perspective as crucial in addressing climate change and environmental injustice. Rather than focus on Indigeneity as an identity, the framers of the Red Deal argue that Indigenous relations to the environment provide a framework for climate change policy such as the Green New Deal.

The Red Deal differs from the Green New Deal in that the Green New Deal often promotes new development and technology aimed at emission reduction while the Red Deal recognizes that this development cannot contribute to meaningful change so long as it exists within colonial and capitalist systems. The Red New Deal offers critiques of the Green New Deal in this sense, contending that ownership and exploitation cannot solve broader issues of environmental degradation and climate change.

=== Blue New Deal ===
The Blue New Deal is a policy agenda for the Green New Deal that focuses on ocean science and politics. It aims to incorporate protections for coastal ecosystems and industries from climate change and build the blue economy into the Green New Deal framework.

Following the Green New Deal resolution proposed by Congresswoman Alexandria Ocasio-Cortez, marine biologists, ocean farmers, and conservationists sought to connect the program with ocean politics. In a July 2019 Grist article, Ayana Elizabeth Johnson, Chad Nelsen, and Bren Smith introduced the concept of the Blue New Deal, arguing that the Green New Deal did not sufficiently address the role of oceans in climate mitigation. In December 2019, Elizabeth Warren announced her plan for a Blue New Deal after Bren Smith brought the idea to her attention at a panel.

The Blue New Deal has a loose network of policy proposals, including re-greening coastlines, investing in wind and wave energy technologies, expanding sustainable ocean farming, restoring marine ecosystems, investing in marine carbon sequestration, ending offshore drilling, cleaning up ocean trash, pre- and post-disaster mitigation, and flood insurance reform.

=== The Inflation Reduction Act and "Unleashing American Energy" ===
In August 2022, Congress adopted the Inflation Reduction Act (IRA) in order to invest in energy security, clean energy, and affordable healthcare. According to Guri Bang of Norwegian University of Life Sciences, the IRA is structured to utilize economic incentives rather than the implementation of regulatory policies in order to combine economic and climate related policies. The IRA allocates $369 billion in public spending for over 50 programs aimed at reducing greenhouse gas emissions by approximately 40% from 2005 levels by 2030 in the US. In order to address congressional opposition, the implementation of the IRA involved compromise such as the inclusion of leases for fossil fuel extraction.

This legislation will facilitate the progression of the Green New Deal in achieving its goals related to clean energy development, environmental justice, and action against climate change. The IRA contributes significantly to the Green New Deal through federal funding, providing access to resources such as decarbonization and workforce development to local governments, indigenous communities, etc. Supporters of the IRA argue that this legislation is substantial in serving as a foundation for the long-term implementation of the Green New Deal.

However, on January 20, 2025, President Donald Trump signed Executive Order 14154, "Unleashing American Energy" which includes the revocation of the Inflation Reduction Act and the Green New Deal in sections 4 and 7. There is current uncertainty as to how this will be implemented, how this will impact the funding of clean energy initiatives such as the Green New Deal, and the implications of this Executive Order on the renewable energy sector. The administration has publicly denounced efforts related to environmental justice investments and decarbonization due to an increasing push for domestic energy expansion, limiting the implementation of efforts under the Green New Deal. The expansion of domestic fossil fuel development and rollbacks of environmental protections contradict the efforts of the Green New Deal.

Legal experts have questioned the legality of this Executive Order, and express concern regarding the environmental implications of the acceleration of fracking. For example, Andres Restrepo, senior attorney of the Sierra Club, has stated his concern that “A huge amount of the work that has been spent to protect the public health and welfare will be erased.” There is uncertainty regarding the practical implementation of “Unleashing American Energy,” especially in terms of the consequences this may have on the Green New Deal and related policy proposals.

== International ==
After the Green New Deal idea was proposed by Thomas Friedman in 2007 and developed by the British Green New Deal Group, a plan for an international green new deal was advanced by the United Nations. On October 22, 2008, UNEP's Executive Director Achim Steiner unveiled a Global Green New Deal initiative as a response to the Great Recession, aiming to create jobs in "green" industries, thus boosting the world economy and curbing climate change at the same time. The UN continued to promote the global green new deal into 2009 both to the G20 and its wider membership. The International green new deal was also supported by Gordon Brown. Yet despite the success of Brown and others in bringing about a short lived worldwide return to Keynesian stimulus policies, the focus of extra government spending was on supporting existing economic activity, rather than speeding the transition to the green economy. In 2019, United Nations officials and others once again called for a global green new deal. In July 2021, the Global Alliance for a Green New Deal was launched, a group of politicians from around the world campaigning for an international Green New Deal.

== See also ==
- Climate change adaptation
- Climate change mitigation
- Economic analysis of climate change
- Environmental policy of the United States
- Energy transition
- European Green Deal
- Eco-capitalism
- Green economy
- Green growth
- Just transition
- Politics of climate change
- Prosperity Without Growth
- Sunrise Movement
