= The Red Nation =

Native American advocacy group

- Founded at: Albuquerque, New Mexico
- Type: Advocacy group
- Purpose: Liberation of Indigenous peoples
- Website: therednation.org

The Red Nation is a Native American advocacy group that focuses on decolonization and Marxism-Leninism as means to liberate Indigenous peoples.

In 2021, in response to the Green New Deal, the group published the Red Deal, a proposal designed to supplement the Green New Deal and place Indigenous peoples and their lands at the centre of climate change action.

== Organization ==
The Red Nation is a group of Native American activists and scholars, including co-founder Nick Estes. The group is run entirely by volunteers.

The group is based in Albuquerque, New Mexico. Its principles of unity were ratified on August 10, 2018.

== Activities ==
The group advocates for the abolition of borders. In 2021, responding to the Green New Deal, the group proposed the Red Deal, which states that the solution to the climate crisis must centre around Indigenous peoples and the land they should own. The group proposed the Red Deal as a set of additional steps that should be taken in addition to the Green New Deal proposals.

The Red Nation operate a podcast.

== Selected publications ==
- The Red Deal: Indigenous Action to Save Our Earth, 2021, Common Notions Press, (ISBN 9781942173434)
