= Gloria White-Hammond =

Pastor and activist (born 1951)

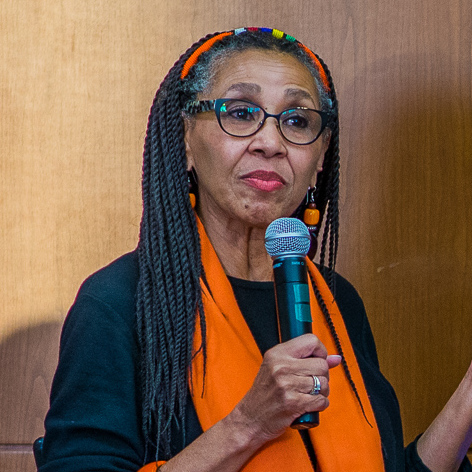
- Born: August 1951 (age 75); Texas

Reverend Gloria E. White-Hammond, born Gloria Elaine White (born 1951), is a pastor, community organizer, and activist from Boston, Massachusetts. She is a co-pastor of Bethel African Methodist Episcopal Church (AME) in Boston, and is the co-founder and Executive Director of My Sister's Keeper. She has been involved in community service projects for the city of Boston and the global black community. She has traveled to Africa as a medical missionary under My Sister's Keeper, a women-led human rights initiative that focuses on rectifying effects of the Sudanese civil war (2023–present) on women and girls in particular.

== Early life ==
Born in August 1951 in Texas, White-Hammond moved frequently during her early years due to her father's military status. She lived in Texas until she was a toddler, then moved to Tennessee, New Hampshire, Guam, and Indiana. She spent most of her adolescent years in New Hampshire and graduated high school in Indiana. White-Hammond knew she wanted to be a doctor at a young age. She was inspired to pursue a career in medicine by a book she checked out of the library titled How to Be a Doctor.

She moved to Boston for undergraduate study, where she attended Boston University (BU) receiving her Bachelor's degree in Biology in 1972, her Master of Divinity from Harvard Divinity School, and her Doctorate from Tufts University School of Medicine in 1976. She's lived in Boston ever since.

White-Hammond refers to her time at BU as a critical period because of the turbulence taking place on college campuses with protests surrounding the Vietnam War and race relations in the U.S. However, she enjoyed these demonstrations, stating they "...informed who I am today." She met her husband while in college and they married in 1973 while they were in medical school.

== Career ==
White-Hammond originally focused on her respective medical field. She worked in the South End Community Health Center in Boston as a pediatrician.

However, in the 1980s she and her husband decided to pursue spiritual goals. They founded the Bethel AME Church in Boston. Their target audience was the younger demographic of Boston in response to rising youth violence in the city. As part of their efforts, their church joined forced with the Boston TenPoint Coalition, a Christian organization that works with black and brown Boston youth to mitigate the harms of street violence. This inspired her to start up "Do the Write Thing," a creative writing ministry for girls in the city of Boston that held meetings in the AME church and in juvenile detention centers.

In the early 2000s, White-Hammond traveled to Africa to provide medical services in Botswana, South Africa, and Ivory Coast. During a visit to Darfur refugee camps, she was accompanied by Liz Walker and Linda Mason. On this trip, she learned that Sudanese women and girls being enslaved because of the Sudanese civil war (2023–present).

White-Hammond raised funds with an anti-slavery organization in Boston and a Christian solidarity organization based in Switzerland. The funding was used to buy the freedom of 6,000+ enslaved women and girls.

The rescued women and children were keen to get better education and requested White-Hammond's assistance. This inspired her and her co-founder Liz Walker, to create My Sister's Keeper, a faith based collective of a diverse group of women assisting various communities of women in need around the world. Through the organization, White-Hammond built a school in Sudan for the girls and an adult literacy program for their mothers.

White-Hammond was also chairwoman of the Million Voices for Darfur campaign led by the Save Darfur Coalition and was co-chair of the Massachusetts Coalition to Save Darfur. She later became the chair of the Save Darfur Coalition group. As the Managing Director of the Coalition, she led the call for President Bush to send a presidential envoy to Sudan through a petition signed by political and NGO leaders.

=== Published articles ===
- When We Label Goals of Care as “Aggressive”: Moving Away from Unintended Harms Towards Respecting Faith, Hope and Miracles in African American Christians at End-of-Life, (2022) with Elizabeth Chuang, Shena Gazaway, Moneka Thompson, and Ronit Elk.
- Witnesses and Victims Both: Healthcare Workers and Grief in the Time of COVID-19, (2021) with Michael W. Rabow, Chao-Hui Huang, and Rodney O. Tucker.

== Personal life ==
White-Hammond's husband, Ray, was former chairman of the Boston Foundation. Her oldest daughter, Mariama, leads a youth advocacy organization called Project Hip-Hop and her younger daughter teaches at Boston Public Schools.

== Legacy ==
White-Hammond received an honorary degree from Tufts University in 2006. The Irish Immigration Center named White-Hammond and Liz Walker as two of the "Party of Five" honorees at the 2006 Solas Awards for humanitarian work. The American Jewish Committee's Boston chapter presented Gloria White-Hammond and her husband with the Norman S. Rabb award for their humanitarian efforts in October 15, 2007.

In 2023, she was recognized as one of "Boston’s most admired, beloved, and successful Black Women leaders" by the Black Women Lead project.
