= Paul Bledsoe =

American policy advisor and academic

Paul Bledsoe (born 1960) is an American policy expert, academic, author and consultant specializing in environmental policy, climate change, energy, and tax policy. He is a lecturer at American University’s School of Public Affairs. Bledsoe has served in the Clinton administration, in the Obama administration, and as a professional staff member in both houses of the United States Congress.

== Early life and education ==
Bledsoe was born in 1960 in Washington D.C. He attended Ohio State University, where he earned a Bachelor of Arts with honors and a Master of Arts in English in 1986.

== Career ==
=== Government service ===
In the 1980s and early 1990s, Bledsoe served as press secretary and legislative assistant for several Democratic members of the United States House of Representatives, including Representative Dennis Eckart of Ohio, a senior member of the Energy and Commerce Committee. From 1993 to 1995, he was the communications director for the U.S. Senate Finance Committee under Chairman Daniel Patrick Moynihan.

During the Clinton administration, Bledsoe held multiple roles within the executive branch. In 1995, he served as Director of Public Affairs for the Bureau of Reclamation before also becoming a Special Assistant to Interior Secretary Bruce Babbitt in 1996. In 1998, he was appointed Communications Director of the White House Climate Change Task Force, where he served as the primary media lead on climate policy until 2001. Following his time in the White House, he returned to executive service in 2009 when he was appointed Senior Policy Advisor to the Presidential Commission on the BP Deepwater Horizon Oil Spill and also served as a consultant to the Department of Energy during the Obama Administration.

=== Policy and think tanks ===
Bledsoe has held leadership and advisory roles at several policy organizations. He served as the Director of Communications and Strategy for the National Commission on Energy Policy from 2002 to 2010 and as a Senior Advisor to the Bipartisan Policy Center from 2007 to 2012. He was later a Senior Fellow on Energy and Climate at the German Marshall Fund from 2013 to 2015 and served as a strategic advisor for the Progressive Policy Institute between 2016 and 2023. Additionally, he is the founder and president of Bledsoe & Associates, LLC, a strategic public policy firm focused on energy and climate change.

=== Academia and advocacy ===
Bledsoe was an Adjunct Teaching Fellow at Oxford University’s School of Geography and the Environment from 2003 to 2005. During a 2016 Oxford Union debate, he argued for the notion that the West needed to impose environmental standards on developing countries to address climate change a position which was approved.

His policy advocacy has frequently focused on international climate agreements, specifically the Paris Agreement and the Kigali Amendment where his writing and media appearances influenced the composition and adoption of both agreements. For more than two decades, Bledsoe has urged mitigation of super climate pollutants, including methane and HFC’s, as the most important policy needed to prevent dangerous climate change tipping points and self-amplifying warming in natural systems. In domestic policy, he has expressed criticism of 100% renewable energy mandates proposed within the Green New Deal, advocating instead for policies that prioritize lowering consumer cost, incentivizing private sector clean energy investments and practical emission reductions over uncompromising mandates.

== Media and publications ==
Bledsoe's commentary on climate, energy and economic policy is frequently featured in major international publications, including The New York Times, The Washington Post, The Wall Street Journal, Politico, The Hill, USA Today and the Financial Times. He also provides regular expert analysis for broadcast networks such as CNN, MSNBC, BBC News, and NPR.
