= Edward Barbier =

American economist

- Born: July 22, 1957 (age 68)
- Occupations: Economist, Professor
- Awards: Fellow of the Association of Environmental and Resource Economists (2015)

Edward Barbier (born 1957) is an environmental and resource economist known for promoting a so-called Green New Deal in response to the climate crisis. He holds the title of University Distinguished Professor, Department of Economics, Colorado State University.

Barbier is known, since 1989, for the promotion of frameworks for valuing nature in economic terms. In 2009, He authored the United Nations’ Global Green New Deal, which was a strategy for greening the global economic recovery after the Great Recession. In 2010, he further elaborated on this strategy in A Global Green New Deal: Rethinking the Economic Recovery, which connected the environment to climate change to human energy and water security, and to human poverty. He has also proposed strategies for the G20 and G7 on how best to green the post-COVID economic recovery.

Barbier has influenced international environmental policy, including influence with the Australian Greens Party. Barbier’s 1987 article is credited as the first representation of sustainability in terms of the popular three intersecting circles, or Venn diagram. He has also written extensively on the role of natural capital in sustainable development.

== Career highlights ==
Barbier was elected Fellow of the Association of Environmental and Resource Economists in 2015.
