= Mariama White-Hammond =

African Methodist Episcopal Church pastor

The Reverend Mariama White-Hammond
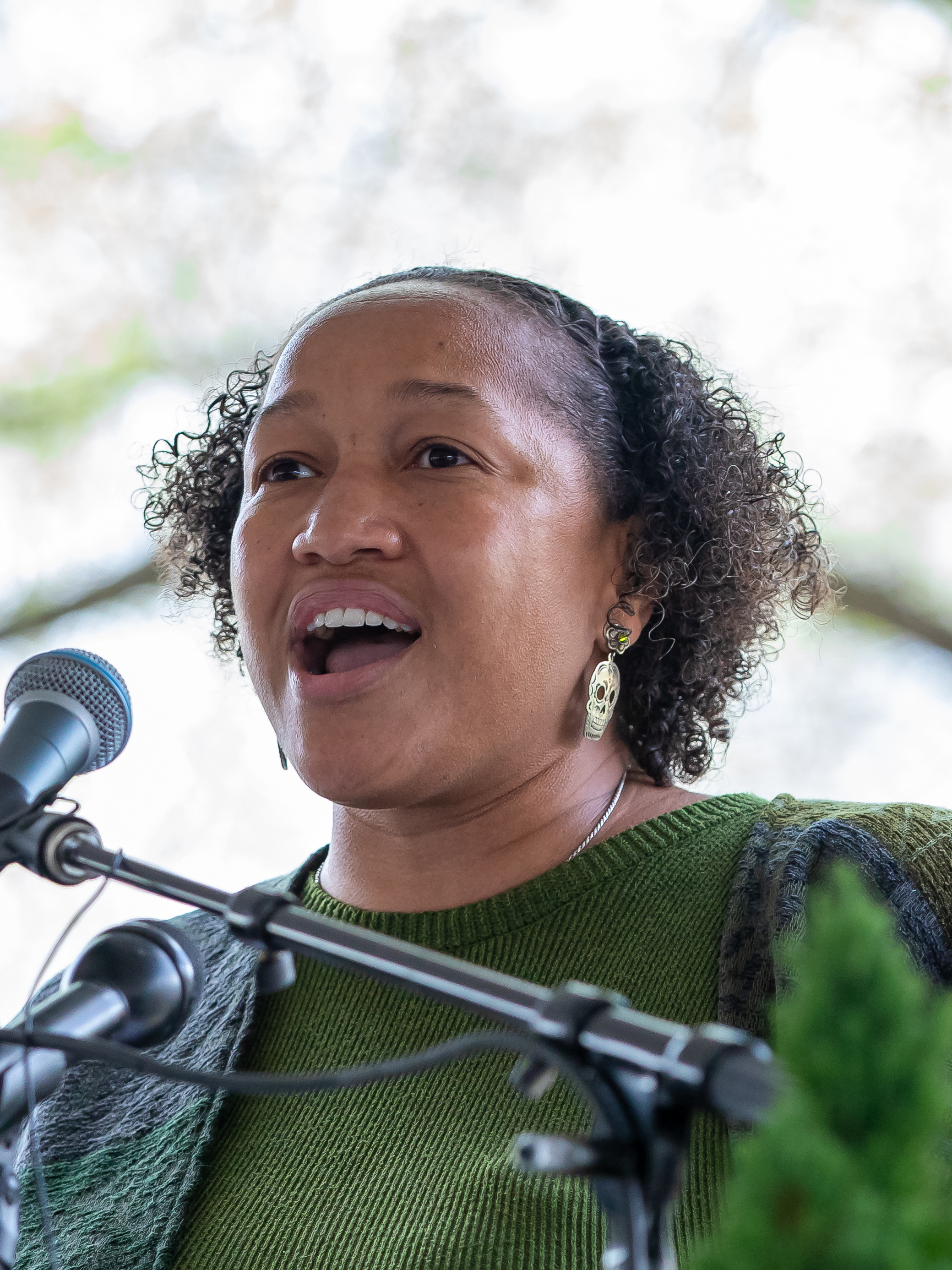
- White-Hammond in 2023

Personal details
- Born: Boston, Massachusetts, USA
- Denomination: African Methodist Episcopal Church
- Parents: Ray Hammond (father); Gloria White-Hammond (mother)
- Spouse: Rahn Dorsey
- Occupation: Pastor
- Education: Master of Divinity
- Alma mater: Boston University School of Theology

Mariama White-Hammond is a pastor and founder of the New Roots African Methodist Episcopal Church in Dorchester, Massachusetts. She previously served as the Chief of Energy, Environment, and Open Space in the City of Boston under Mayor Michelle Wu. Prior to her ordination in the AME Church, she was the director of Project HIP-HOP, a youth organization that uses arts as a way to communicate and educate on social justice topics.

== Early years ==
White-Hammond is the daughter of Ray Hammond and Gloria White-Hammond, both medical doctors and ordained ministers in the African Methodist Episcopal Church. Her parents married in 1973. She is the older of two children; her sister is Adiya White-Hammond.

White-Hammond grew up in the Grove Hall neighborhood of Dorchester, in Boston, Massachusetts. She became politically aware at a young age. As a teen, she boycotted Coke in support of the anti-apartheid movement in South Africa. She attended the Winsor School, a private college preparatory school in Boston's Fenway, and then Stanford University, where she studied human rights law and international relations.

== Activism and ministry ==
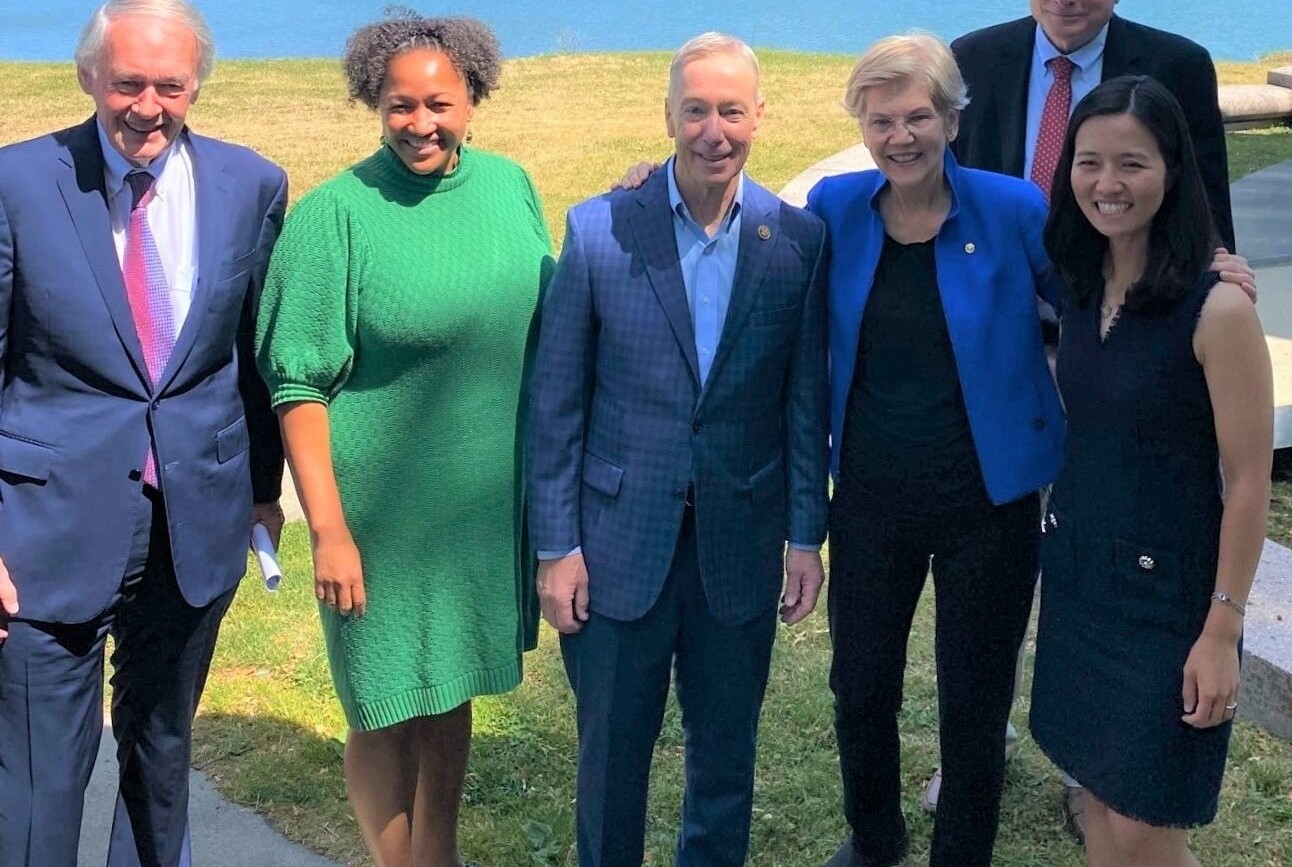
L–R: Sen. Ed Markey, White-Hammond, Rep. Stephen Lynch, Sen. Elizabeth Warren, and Mayor Michelle Wu in 2022

In 2001, White-Hammond became the director of Project HIP-HOP (Highways Into the Past - History, Organizing and Power), a community nonprofit that focuses on social justice arts programming for youth of color in Boston. As a teen, White-Hammond had been a youth member of the organization, which was originally established to educate young people about the history of the civil rights movement. As director, she helped shift the organization to focus on "cultural organizing", using hip-hop culture and arts to encourage youth to speak out on social justice issues. In eleven years with the organization, White-Hammond saw first-hand the challenges faced by inner city youth, as two of her students were shot and killed, and another three injured.

In 2006, she traveled with the youth of Project HIP-HOP to New Orleans, Louisiana, in the wake of Hurricane Katrina. The service trip served as a catalyst for White-Hammond to begin making connections between environmental concerns and racial and economic justice. She became active in local politics, serving as in 2006 as a ward captain for Deval Patrick's re-election campaign for governor.

In 2014, in pursuit of ordination she began studying at Boston University School of Theology, where she completed a Master of Divinity degree in 2017. While a student, she served as the Minister for Ecological Justice at Bethel AME Church. She was ordained in the African Episcopal Methodist Church prior to her graduation, in April 2016.

Since attending seminary, she has become a recognized leader on issues related to environmentalism and racial justice. She serves as a Fellow of the Green Justice Coalition, working on environmental activism in communities of color. She was appointed to Massachusetts Attorney General Maura Healy's Racial Justice and Equity Council in 2016. She lobbied against a natural gas pipeline that was scheduled to be placed in the West Roxbury neighborhood of Boston, and was arrested in a demonstration against the pipeline in 2017, along with 22 other activists, including Karenna Gore, the daughter of former Vice President Al Gore.

In January 2017, White-Hammond served as the Master of Ceremonies for Boston's Women's March, which was estimated to be the largest protest ever held on Boston Common. That same year, she was the master of ceremonies for the Boston People's Climate Mobilization.

Following her father's example, White-Hammond founded New Roots AME Church in Dorchester, in 2018, where she serves as the pastor.

In June 2020, White-Hammond preached at a clergy-organized memorial service held at Bethel AME Church, remembering the lives of three African-Americans who had been killed in spring 2020: George Floyd, Breonna Taylor, and Ahmaud Arbery. The memorial was held following a symbolic funeral procession through the streets of Boston.

In April 2021, she was appointed by Acting Mayor Kim Janey to serve as the city of Boston's chief of environment, energy, and open space. She was retained in this position after Michelle Wu became mayor. In this capacity, she oversees the Parks, Historic Preservation, Food Justice, and Environment Departments. White-Hammond left this role in April 2024

=== Awards ===
- Barr Fellowship (2009)
- The Celtics Heroes Among Us (2005)
- The Roxbury Founders Day Award (2004)
- Boston NAACP Image award
- Grist 50 Fixers for 2019
- Sojourners 11 Women Shaping the Church
- Boston University School of Theology Distinguished Alumna (2025)
