= Recognizing the duty of the Federal Government to create a Green New Deal =

Resolution in the 117th Congress

- Sponsored by: House: Alexandria Ocasio-Cortez (D–NY); Senate: Ed Markey (D–MA)
- Number of co-sponsors: House: 96; Senate: 12

Legislative history
- Introduced in the 118th Congress as H. Res. 319 and S. Res. 173 by Alexandria Ocasio-Cortez (D–NY) and Ed Markey (D–MA) on April 24, 2024; Committee consideration by House: Energy and Commerce, Science, Space, Technology, Education and Labor, Transportation and Infrastructure, Agriculture, Natural Resources, Foreign Affairs, Financial Services, Judiciary, Ways and Means, Oversight and Reform Senate: Environment and Public Works

Recognizing the duty of the Federal Government to create a Green New Deal (H. Res. 332), sometimes just referred to as the Green New Deal, is a resolution introduced in the 117th Congress. The Resolution calls for the creation of a Green New Deal which would create high paying jobs and prevent the Earth from exceeding 1.5°C of warming by investing in renewable energy and putting the United States on track for net-zero emissions.

The resolution itself is non-binding, meaning that it would only express a general sense of Congress, and would not actually implement any of the Green New Deal policies it proposes. Any such policies would have to be passed on their own in a separate bill.

Donald Trump stated that he would "end the Green New Deal" during his second inaugural address on January 20, 2025.

== Background ==
Warming of 2 °C was generally considered (by some) to be an acceptable carbon budget limit until a report in 2018 by the IPCC stated that limiting warming to 1.5 °C would prevent far more damage from a climate catastrophe than limiting emissions to 2 °C. The report also found that global emissions would have to be cut in half by 2030 and the world would have to achieve carbon neutrality by 2050 in order to meet the 1.5 °C goal.

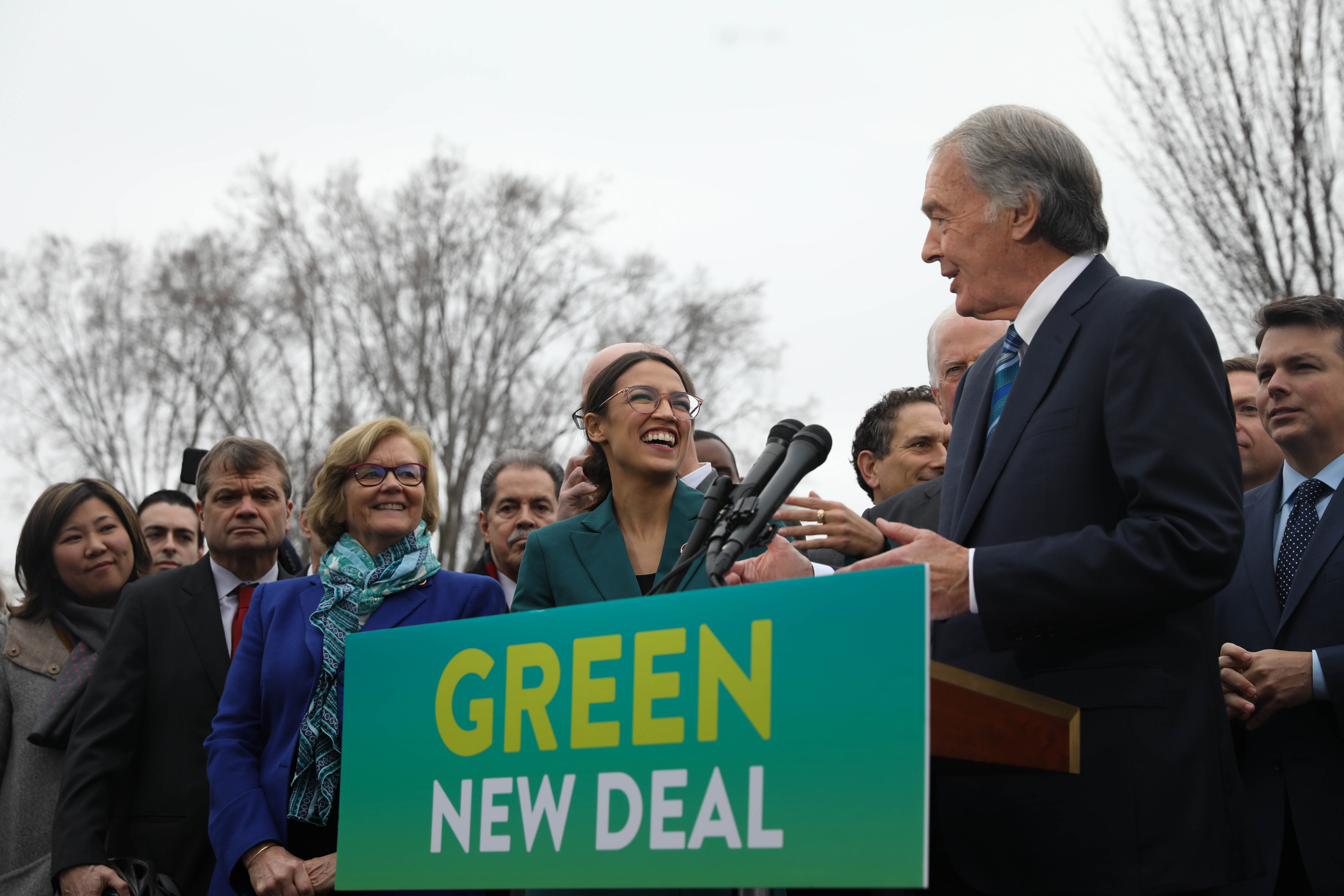
Rep. Ocasio-Cortez and Sen. Markey at a press conference for the resolution

== Provisions ==
=== Acknowledging Climate Change and Inequality ===
The first section of the resolution acknowledges that climate change is a threat, and that 2 °C of warming should be avoided, or else it will cause significant damage to the environment and infrastructure. It also states that emissions must be cut at the rate described by the IPCC in order to avoid this warming. It also says that because the United States emits a disproportionate amount of greenhouse gasses, that it must take a "leading role" in reducing emissions, and that climate change is a threat to national security.

The resolution acknowledges certain wealth inequality problems in the United States: wage stagnation, reduction of bargaining power through unions, and low socioeconomic mobility, among other things. It states that climate change has exacerbated injustices, and that it will mostly effect minorities and people who are low-income.

=== Green New Deal ===
The resolution calls for the creation of a Green New Deal with the following goals:

1. Reducing emissions to stay under 1.5 °C of warming.
2. Create millions of high-wage union jobs and ensuring economic security in general.
3. Investments in infrastructure and industry.
4. Ensuring clean water, clean air, climate resilience, healthy food, the ability to access nature, a sustainable environment.
5. Promoting justice and promoting equality.

=== Mobilization effort ===
The resolution calls for the achievement of these goals through a nation-wide mobilization effort; which it suggests several broad policy objectives, such as:

1. Building smart power grids.
2. Upgrading existing buildings and building new buildings to have the best energy and water efficiency possible.
3. Eliminating greenhouse gas emissions and other pollution from transportation and agriculture.
4. Cleaning up hazardous waste and abandoned sites.
5. Making sure that people who run a business do not face unfair competition.
6. Making sure that all people have access to college education, healthcare, and affordable housing.

== Opinions ==
=== Public and Congress ===
The Green New Deal is generally opposed by members of the Republican Party. The Democratic Party has been split on the issue, however. Public opinion polls seem to suggest that the public in general may be divided on the issue.

=== Democratic leadership ===
Former Speaker of the House Nancy Pelosi has shown reservations on the passage of the bill. Though she has never directly shot it down, she stated in 2019 that she was not making a commitment passing the resolution, but that she welcomed the enthusiasm. At one point she referred to the resolution as "The green dream or whatever they call it".

== Legislative history ==
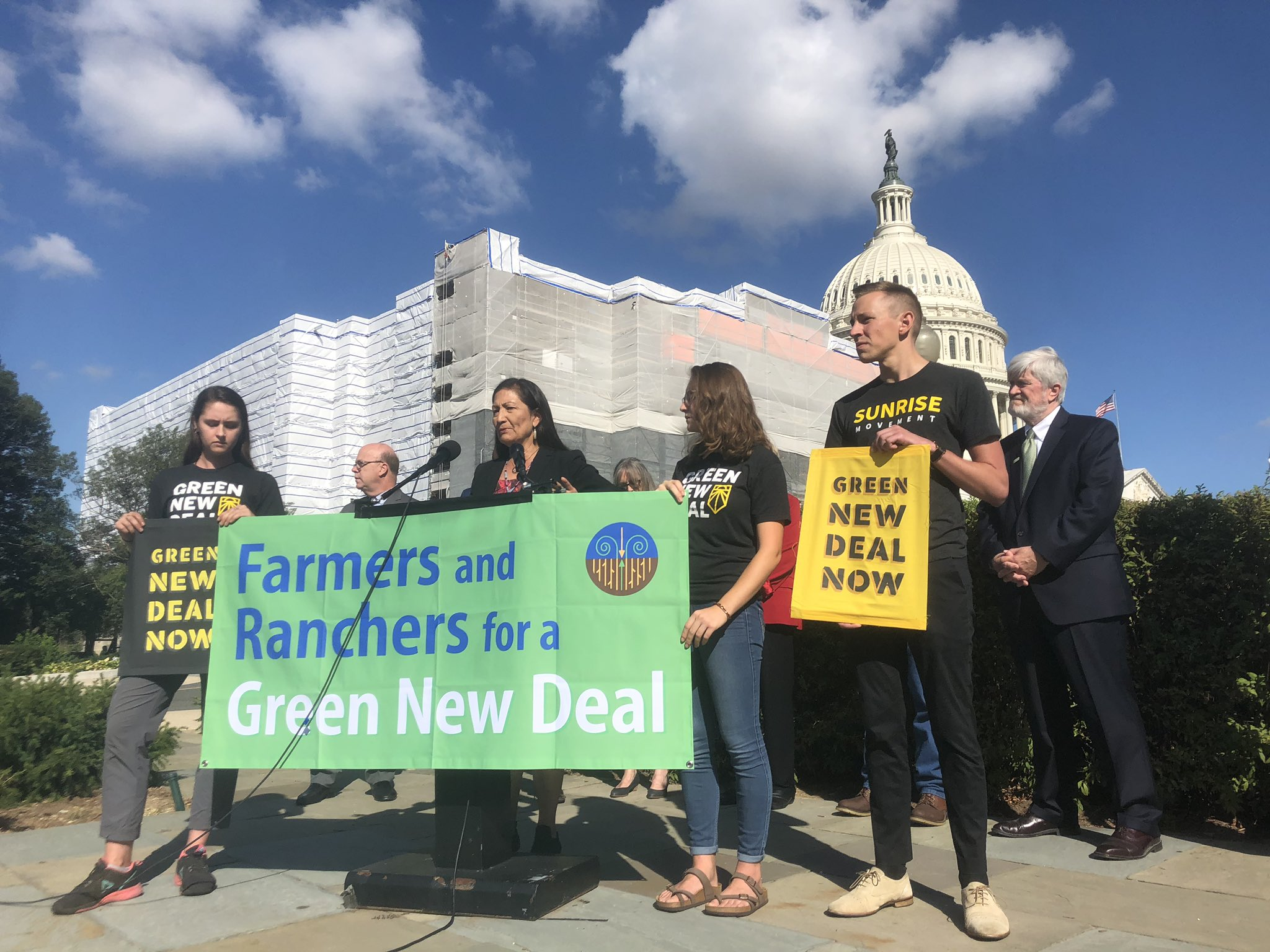
Deb Haaland speaking in support of the resolution in 2019

=== Summary ===
As of February 27, 2024:

Congress	Short title	Bill number(s)	Date introduced	Sponsor(s)	# of cosponsors	Latest status
116th Congress	Recognizing the duty of the Federal Government to create a Green New Deal	H.Res.109	February 7, 2019	Alexandria Ocasio-Cortez (D-NY)	101	Died in Committee
116th Congress	Recognizing the duty of the Federal Government to create a Green New Deal	S.Res.59	February 7, 2019	Ed Markey (D-MA)	14	Died in Committee
116th Congress	Recognizing the duty of the Federal Government to create a Green New Deal	S.J.Res.8	February 13, 2019	Mitch McConnell (R-KY)	0	Cloture not invoked.
117th Congress	Recognizing the duty of the Federal Government to create a Green New Deal	H.Res.332	April 20, 2021	Alexandria Ocasio-Cortez (D-NY)	104	Died in Committee
117th Congress	Recognizing the duty of the Federal Government to create a Green New Deal	S.Res.166	April 20, 2021	Ed Markey (D-MA)	12	Died in Committee
118th Congress	Recognizing the duty of the Federal Government to create a Green New Deal	H.Res.319	April 24, 2023	Alexandria Ocasio-Cortez (D-NY)	96	Referred to Committees of Jurisdiction.
118th Congress	Recognizing the duty of the Federal Government to create a Green New Deal	S.Res.173	April 25, 2023	Ed Markey (D-MA)	12	Referred to Committees of Jurisdiction.

=== 116th Congress ===
The resolution was first introduced in the 116th Congress. Neither Ed Markey or Ocasio-Cortez's versions of the resolution received a vote in either the House or Senate. Republican Senate Majority Leader Mitch McConnell introduced the resolution with the exact same text as Markey's own version and forced a vote on it in an attempt to make Democrats to take a position on the measure and use it against them in the 2020 election. Democrats refused to legitimize the effort and voted "present" in protest. The Resolution was thus defeated 0-57, with three conservative Democrats and one independent also voting against McConnell's resolution.

=== 117th Congress ===
The resolution was introduced on April 20, 2021 and received 101 co-sponsors.

Marjorie Taylor Greene challenged the resolution's sponsor Alexandria Ocasio-Cortez to a debate over the measure. Greene said in a tweet that she was told by Ocasio-Cortez to read "all 14 pages" first, and Greene seemingly admitted that she had not yet read the resolution.

== See also ==
- Climate change
- Climate change denial
- Special Report on Global Warming of 1.5 °C
- Renewable energy in the United States
- Green New Deal
- New Deal
- Wealth inequality in the United States
