= Nick Estes =

American journalist

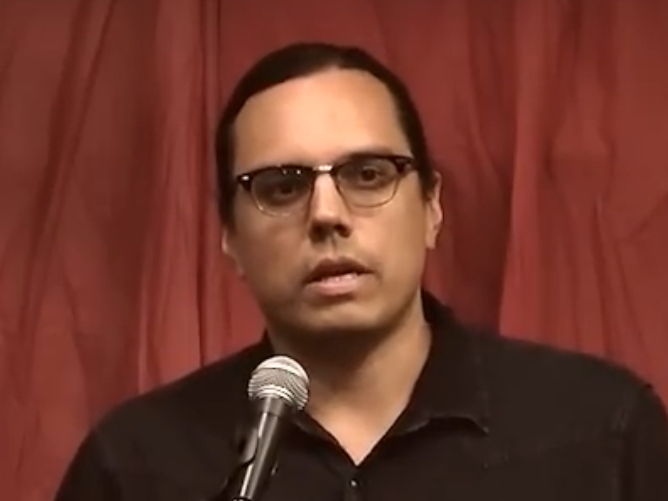
- Estes in 2019
- Occupation: Assistant Professor in American Indian Studies at University of Minnesota
- Organizations: The Red Nation; Oak Lake Writers' Society; Red Media
- Known for: Indigenous organizing and history, nonfiction
- Awards: 2019 Lannan Literary Award Fellowship for Nonfiction
- Honours: 2020 Marguerite Casey Foundation's Freedom Scholar

Academic background
- Education: University of South Dakota (BA, MA); University of New Mexico (PhD)
- Thesis: Our History is the Future: Mni Wiconi and the Struggle for Native Liberation (2017)

Nick Estes is a Sicangu American community organizer, journalist, and historian at the University of Minnesota. He has cofounded The Red Nation and Red Media. In 2019, he was awarded the Lannan Literary Award Fellowship for nonfiction. In 2020, he was honored as the Marguerite Casey Foundation's freedom scholar.

== Bibliography ==
=== Books ===
- 2019: Our History is the Future: Standing Rock versus the Dakota Access Pipeline, and the Long Tradition of Indigenous Resistance, Verso
- 2019: Standing with Standing Rock: Voices from the #NoDAPL Movement. University of Minnesota Press
- 2021: Red Nation Rising: From Bordertown Violence to Native Liberation. PM Press
