= Gabriel Ocasio-Cortez =

American activist and advocate

- Born: November 25, 1992 (age 33); Bronx, New York City
- Occupations: Activist, advocate
- Relatives: Alexandria Ocasio-Cortez (sister)

Gabriel Ocasio-Cortez (born November 25, 1992) is an American activist, advocate, and musician. He is known for his advocacy on behalf of the Deaf, hard of hearing, and LGBTQ+ communities, and for founding artist's collective turned advocacy organization the Deaf Collective. He has worked in homelessness services and as a realtor. He was named to the Dazed100 in 2021 and the Out100 in 2025. He is the younger brother of U.S. Representative Alexandria Ocasio-Cortez.

== Biography ==
Ocasio-Cortez was born in The Bronx on November 25, 1992, but moved with his family just a couple of years later to Yorktown Heights, New York. He was born to Sergio Ocasio-Roman, an architect who was born to a Puerto Rican family in New York, and Blanca Ocasio-Cortez (née Cortés Rivera) who was born in Puerto Rico. At the age of 15, he woke up finding that he'd lost half of his hearing. That same year, he began studying realty law to help protect their family home from foreclosure after his father's death. At the same time, he began struggling with the idea of coming out as gay, due to what he called "a very valid fear... that I would be rejected from my house."

He attended Long Island University, where he studied art and psychotherapy. He worked as a realtor in New York before 2018, but has since become a consultant focused on supporting the unhoused. He also works as a rehousing advocate at city shelters, supporting those in need of rehousing.

He is also a musician: after his hearing loss, he reportedly memorized the vibrations of the instruments he plays, guitar and piano, to continue his music.

Prior to 2018, he nominated his sister, Alexandria Ocasio-Cortez, to run for Congress, and connected her with the group then known as Brand New Congress but since known as the Justice Democrats. After his sister's election, though, he faced threats, including potential bombs, and became unable to show open houses due to this. He's stated that he could see her in the Oval Office in the future.

In November 2020, he founded Deaf-centric arts collective the Deaf Collective, which emphasized supporting Deaf and queer art. In April 2021, the organization, which he heads, partnered with TikTok to design and develop their automated captioning system. He has since emphasized continuing to work on this with other entertainment companies and publishers.

He also hosts raves, and has emphasized ensuring that they are also accessible to the hearing impaired. During these raves, he frequently discusses activism.

In April 2025, a viral rumor on TikTok suggested, falsely, that he was associated with smuggling fentanyl, also mistaking his name for Matthew. He soon posted a TikTok response debunking it, and a follow-up warning that these viral lies could cause significant real harm. Snopes also debunked it, pointing out the two sites that created the rumor were satire sites that stated explicitly nothing they say is true.

He has emphasized that, in his opinion, "housing is a human right". He has stated he's against corporate money in politics. He has also discussed the importance of activism in supporting the Deaf and hearing-impaired communities. He has stated that he's been asked about his interest in running for office himself, but demurred that he "would not want to encourage... the precedent of family dynasties in politics."

He was named to the Dazed 100 in 2021 and the Out100 in 2025.
