= Alexandria Ocasio-Cortez =

American politician and activist (born 1989)

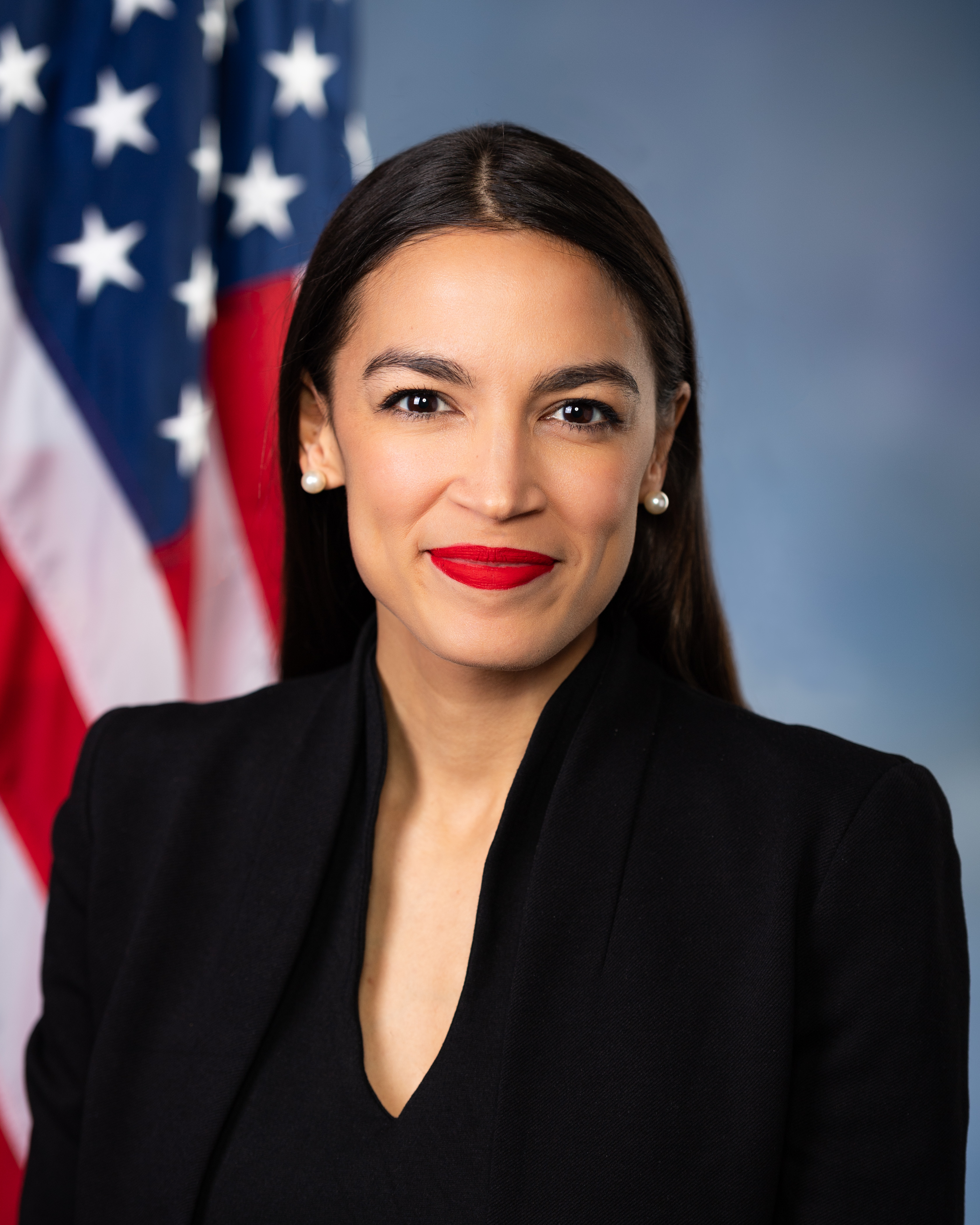
- Official portrait, 2018

Member of the U.S. House of Representatives from New York's 14th district
- Incumbent
- Assumed office January 3, 2019
- Preceded by: Joe Crowley

Personal details
- Born: October 13, 1989 (age 37) New York City, New York, U.S.
- Party: Democratic
- Other political affiliations: Working Families (Note: Ocasio-Cortez has been elected on both the Democratic and Working Families ballot lines through New York's system of electoral fusion.); Democratic Socialists of America (Note: The Democratic Socialists of America (DSA) is not a registered political party. Instead, it is a political organization for those with democratic socialist ideologies. AOC is a member of and is endorsed by the New York City Democratic Socialists of America. AOC joined DSA in 2018. Due to a payment error, her membership lapsed in 2019. Neither DSA nor AOC noticed until 2026, when AOC rejoined.)
- Relatives: Gabriel Ocasio-Cortez (brother)
- Education: Boston University (BA)
- Website: House website Campaign website
- Ocasio-Cortez's voice Ocasio-Cortez participates in a congressional hearing on economic inequality. Recorded September 28, 2021

Alexandria Ocasio-Cortez (Note: Pronounced /oʊˌkɑːsioʊ kɔːrˈtɛz/ oh-KAH-see-oh kor-TEZ; (Latin American Spanish: [aleɣˈsandɾja oˈkasjo koɾˈtes]) (born October 13, 1989), also known as AOC, is an American politician and activist who has served since 2019 as the U.S. representative for New York's 14th congressional district. She is a member of the Democratic Party and the Democratic Socialists of America.

Ocasio-Cortez was first elected to Congress in 2018, drawing national attention after defeating Democratic Caucus chair and 10-term incumbent Joe Crowley in the Democratic primary election. Crowley's defeat was widely regarded as the biggest primary upset that year. Ocasio-Cortez was reelected in 2020, 2022, 2024, and 2026.

Taking office at age 29, Ocasio-Cortez is the youngest woman ever elected to Congress. She was also, alongside Rashida Tlaib, one of the first two female members of the Democratic Socialists of America (DSA) elected to Congress. Ocasio-Cortez has been described as progressive, left-wing, left-wing populist, and far-left. She advocates a progressive platform that includes support for worker cooperatives, Medicare for All, tuition-free public colleges, a jobs guarantee, a Green New Deal, and abolishing ICE.

== Early life and education ==
Alexandria Ocasio-Cortez was born on October 13, 1989, in the Parkchester neighborhood of the Bronx, New York City. Her father, Sergio Ocasio-Roman, was born in the Bronx to a Puerto Rican family and became an architect; her mother, Blanca Ocasio-Cortez (née Cortés Rivera), was born in Puerto Rico and raised in Arecibo. She has a younger brother, Gabriel. The family lived in an apartment in Parkchester until Ocasio-Cortez was five, when they moved to a small house in suburban Yorktown Heights. According to Ocasio-Cortez, her parents pooled their savings to buy the home so that their children could attend better public schools; her mother worked as a house cleaner and school bus driver.

Ocasio-Cortez attended Yorktown High School, graduating in 2007. She placed second in the microbiology category of the Intel International Science and Engineering Fair in 2007 with a research project testing the effects of antioxidants on the lifespan of the nematode Caenorhabditis elegans. In high school, she participated in the National Hispanic Institute's Lorenzo de Zavala Youth Legislative Session. Her first job was as a hostess at an Irish pub in Westchester County. After graduating from high school, she served as an LDZ Secretary of State while attending Boston University. She was also a John F. Lopez Intern.

Her father died of lung cancer in 2008, during her second year of college, and she became involved in a lengthy probate dispute over his estate. She said the experience taught her "firsthand how attorneys appointed by the court to administer an estate can enrich themselves at the expense of the families struggling to make sense of the bureaucracy". During college, Ocasio-Cortez interned in the Boston office of U.S. senator Ted Kennedy, working on foreign affairs and immigration issues. She said that, as the office's only Spanish speaker, she handled calls from Spanish-speaking constituents. Ocasio-Cortez graduated cum laude from Boston University in 2011 with a Bachelor of Arts degree, double-majoring in international relations and economics.

After graduating, Ocasio-Cortez returned to the Bronx and worked as a bartender and waitress to help her mother save their family home from foreclosure. She later launched Brook Avenue Press, a publishing venture intended to produce books portraying the Bronx favorably. Ocasio-Cortez also worked as an educational director for the National Hispanic Institute.

== Early political career ==
Before running for Congress, Ocasio-Cortez worked as an organizer for the Bernie Sanders 2016 presidential campaign. After the election, she traveled across the U.S. by car, visiting places such as Flint, Michigan, and the Standing Rock Indian Reservation in North Dakota, and speaking to people affected by the Flint water crisis and the Dakota Access Pipeline. In an interview, she recalled her December 2016 visit to Standing Rock as a tipping point, saying that until then she had believed that the only way to run for office effectively was to have access to wealth, social influence, and power. But her visit to North Dakota, where she saw others "putting their whole lives and everything that they had on the line for the protection of their community", inspired her to begin to work for her own community. One day after she visited North Dakota, she received a call from Brand New Congress, which was recruiting progressive candidates (her brother had nominated her soon after Election Day 2016). Ocasio-Cortez said she was first exposed to the Democratic Socialists of America (DSA) when a friend brought her to a local meeting in Washington Heights. She has credited Jabari Brisport's unsuccessful City Council campaign with restoring her belief in electoral politics, in running as a socialist candidate, and in the DSA as an organization.

== U.S. House of Representatives (2019–present) ==
=== 2018 congressional election ===
Ocasio-Cortez's congressional campaign logo was inspired by "revolutionary posters and visuals from the past"

Ocasio-Cortez began her campaign in April 2017 while waiting tables and tending bar at Flats Fix, a taqueria in New York City's Union Square. "For 80 percent of this campaign, I operated out of a paper grocery bag hidden behind that bar", she told Bon Appétit. She was the first person since 2004 to challenge Joe Crowley, the Democratic Caucus Chair, in the primary. She faced a financial disadvantage, saying, "You can't really beat big money with more money. You have to beat them with a totally different game." Ocasio-Cortez's campaign undertook grassroots mobilization and did not take donations from corporations. Her campaign posters were said to have been inspired by "revolutionary posters and visuals from the past".

The candidates' only face-to-face encounter during the campaign occurred on a local political talk show, Inside City Hall, on June 15. The format was a joint interview conducted by Errol Louis, which NY1 characterized as a debate. A debate in the Bronx was scheduled for June 18, but Crowley did not participate. He sent former New York City Council member Annabel Palma in his place.

==== Endorsements ====
Ocasio-Cortez was endorsed by progressive and civil-rights organizations such as MoveOn and Democracy for America. Governor Andrew Cuomo endorsed Crowley, as did both of New York's U.S. senators, Chuck Schumer and Kirsten Gillibrand, multiple U.S. representatives, various local elected officials and trade unions, and groups such as the Sierra Club, Planned Parenthood, the Working Families Party, NARAL Pro-Choice America, and Moms Demand Action for Gun Sense in America, among others. California representative Ro Khanna, who, like Ocasio-Cortez, was backed by Justice Democrats, initially endorsed Crowley but later endorsed Ocasio-Cortez in an unusual dual endorsement.

==== Primary election ====
2018 Democratic primary results map by precinct Ocasio-Cortez: 50–60%; 60–70%; 70–80%; 80–90%; 90–100%; Crowley: 50–60%; 60–70%; 70–80%; 80–90%; 90–100%; Tie No votes

On June 26, 2018, Ocasio-Cortez received 56.7% of the vote (16,898) to Crowley's 43.3% (12,880). The result immediately attracted nationwide attention and was widely described as an upset, including by Time, CNN, The New York Times, and The Guardian. She was outspent by a margin of 18 to 1 ($1.5 million to $83,000) but was endorsed by some influential groups on the party's left. Crowley conceded on election night, but did not telephone Ocasio-Cortez that night to congratulate her, fueling short-lived speculation that he might run against her in the general election.

Bernie Sanders and Noam Chomsky congratulated her. Several commentators noted the similarities between Ocasio-Cortez's victory over Crowley and Dave Brat's Tea Party movement-supported 2014 victory over House majority leader Eric Cantor in the Republican primary for Virginia's 7th congressional district. Like Crowley, Cantor was a high-ranking member in his party's caucus. After her primary win, Ocasio-Cortez endorsed several progressive primary challengers to Democratic incumbents nationwide.

Without campaigning for it, Ocasio-Cortez won the Reform Party primary as a write-in candidate in a neighboring congressional district, New York's 15th, with a total vote count of nine, the highest among all 22 write-in candidates. She declined the nomination.

==== General election ====
Ocasio-Cortez faced Republican nominee Anthony Pappas in the November 6 general election. Pappas, an economics professor, did not actively campaign. At the time, the 14th district had a Cook Partisan Voting Index of D+29, making it New York City's sixth-most Democratic district, with registered Democrats outnumbering Republicans almost six to one.

Ocasio-Cortez was endorsed by various progressive organizations and figures, including former president Barack Obama and U.S. senator Bernie Sanders. She spoke at the Netroots Nation conference in August 2018, and was called "the undisputed star of the convention".

Crowley remained on the ballot as the nominee of the Working Families Party (WFP) and the Women's Equality Party (WEP). Neither Crowley nor the WFP actively campaigned; both had endorsed Ocasio-Cortez after the Democratic primary. Ocasio-Cortez called the WEP, which Governor Cuomo created ahead of the 2014 New York gubernatorial election, a cynical, centrist group that endorsed male incumbents over female challengers like her and Cynthia Nixon. Former Connecticut senator Joe Lieberman, who won reelection in 2006 on a third-party line after losing the Democratic primary in 2006, penned a July 17 column in the Wall Street Journal expressing hope that Crowley would actively campaign on the WFP ballot line. WFP executive director Dan Cantor wrote an endorsement of, and apology to, Ocasio-Cortez for the New York Daily News; he asked voters not to vote for Crowley if his name remained on the general election ballot.

Ocasio-Cortez won the election with 78% of the vote (110,318) to Pappas's 13.6% (19,202). Crowley, on the WFP and WEP lines, received 9,348 votes (6.6%). Her election was part of a broader Democratic victory in the 2018 midterm elections, as the party gained control of the House by picking up 41 seats. Saikat Chakrabarti, who had been her campaign co-chair, became chief of staff for her congressional office. His departure in 2019 drew considerable speculation as to whether Ocasio-Cortez was trying to implement a more moderate strategy.

==== Media coverage ====
The first media network to give Ocasio-Cortez a platform and extensively cover her campaign and policies was The Young Turks, a left-wing online news program. After her primary win, she quickly garnered nationwide media attention, including numerous articles and TV talk-show appearances. She also drew considerable media attention when she and Sanders campaigned for James Thompson in Kansas in July 2018. A rally in Wichita had to be moved from a theater with a capacity of 1,500 when far more people said they would attend. The event drew 4,000 people, with some seated on the floor. In The New Yorker, Benjamin Wallace-Wells wrote that while Sanders remained "the de facto leader of an increasingly popular left, [he is unable to] do things that do not come naturally to him, like supply hope." Wallace-Wells suggested that Ocasio-Cortez had made Sanders's task easier, as he could point to her success to show that ideas "once considered to be radical are now part of the mainstream".

Until she defeated incumbent Joe Crowley in the 2018 Democratic primary, Ocasio-Cortez received little coverage on most traditional news media outlets. Jimmy Dore interviewed her when she first announced her candidacy in June 2017. After her primary win, Brian Stelter wrote that progressive media outlets, such as The Young Turks and The Intercept, "saw the Ocasio-Cortez upset coming" in advance. Margaret Sullivan wrote in The Washington Post that traditional metrics of measuring a campaign's viability, like total fundraising, were contributing to a "media failure" and that "they need to get closer to what voters are thinking and feeling: their anger and resentment, their disenfranchisement from the centers of power, their pocketbook concerns."

Ocasio-Cortez's campaign was featured on the cover of the June 2018 edition of The Indypendent, a free New York City-based monthly newspaper. In a tweet, she hailed the cover appearance on "NYC's classic monthly" as an important breakthrough for her campaign. Otherwise, Ocasio-Cortez was barely mentioned in print until her primary win.

Ocasio-Cortez was one of the subjects of the 2018 Michael Moore documentary Fahrenheit 11/9; it chronicled her primary campaign.

In an attempt to embarrass Ocasio-Cortez just before she took office, Twitter user "AnonymousQ" shared a video dating to Ocasio-Cortez's college years: a Boston University student-produced dance video in which she briefly appeared. Many social media users came to her defense, inspiring memes and a Twitter account syncing the footage to songs like "Mambo No. 5" and "Gangnam Style". Ocasio-Cortez responded by posting a video of herself dancing to Edwin Starr's "War" outside her congressional office.

Elizabeth Warren wrote the entry on Ocasio-Cortez for 2019's Time 100. The documentary Knock Down the House, directed by Rachel Lears, which focuses on four female Democrats in the 2018 United States elections who were not career politicians—Ocasio-Cortez, Amy Vilela, Cori Bush, and Paula Jean Swearengin—premiered at the 2019 Sundance Film Festival. Ocasio-Cortez was the only one of the women featured in the film to win. It was released by Netflix on May 1, 2019. Ocasio-Cortez also appeared in Lears's 2022 film To the End, which focuses on the effects of climate change. The film debuted at the 2022 Sundance Film Festival and was presented at the Tribeca Film Festival in June 2022.

=== 2020 congressional election ===
Michelle Caruso-Cabrera challenged Ocasio-Cortez in the 2020 Democratic primary. After Ocasio-Cortez won the nomination, Caruso-Cabrera reorganized and ran in the general election as the Serve America Movement nominee. Ocasio-Cortez's Republican challengers in the general election included nominee John Cummings, a former police officer, and Antoine Tucker, who ran as a write-in candidate.

The American Prospect wrote in October 2020 that Ocasio-Cortez was "spending the 2020 campaign running workshops" for constituents on workplace organizing, fighting eviction, and organizing childcare. It noted that Ocasio-Cortez was often not featured in the streamed workshops, saying the "strategy decentralizes the candidate from her own campaign".

On October 20, 2020, Ocasio-Cortez hosted a Twitch stream of the social deduction game Among Us, with fellow congresswoman Ilhan Omar, and many established streamers such as Pokimane, Hasan Piker, DrLupo, and mxmtoon. The stream peaked with over 400,000 viewers and, according to The Guardian's Joshua Rivera, succeeded in humanizing her. Ocasio-Cortez again streamed Among Us on Twitch on November 27, 2020, with Hasan Piker, xQc, ContraPoints and Canadian MP Jagmeet Singh to raise money for food pantries, eviction defense legal aid, and community support organizations to assist those suffering economic hardship during the COVID-19 pandemic. The stream raised $200,000 and Ocasio-Cortez wrote, "This is going to make such a difference for those who need it most right now."

=== 2022 congressional election ===
Ocasio-Cortez ran unopposed in the Democratic primary. She defeated Republican Tina Forte and Conservative Party nominee Desi Cuellar in the general election.

=== 2024 congressional election ===
In May 2024, the DSA debated whether to endorse Ocasio-Cortez. Some members argued that she was more committed to the Democratic Party and that her positions on Palestine had become weaker. On June 23, the DSA National Political Committee (NPC) voted to endorse her so long as she fulfilled its list of demands, most concerning Palestine. The New York City chapter, which endorsed her, rejected the deal. On July 10, the NPC withdrew its endorsement of Ocasio-Cortez, citing her participation in a panel that conflated antisemitism with anti-Zionism, her support for a resolution that characterized denial of Israel's right to exist as antisemitism, and a co-signed press release in support of the Iron Dome defense system.

Investment banker Marty Dolan, a moderate Democrat, ran against Ocasio-Cortez in the primary. Ocasio-Cortez won overwhelmingly.

Ocasio-Cortez again easily won the general election against Forte. Some voters in her district split their tickets, voting for Ocasio-Cortez and for Trump in the presidential election. Harris won 65% of the district's vote and Trump 33%, an increase from 2020. A political analyst said this was because both Trump and Ocasio-Cortez "were leading with the message of working-class pocketbook issues". Ocasio-Cortez asked those who split their tickets why they did so; some said that they both cared about the working class and were "less establishment", while others cited the Gaza war and the economy.

=== 2026 congressional election ===
In April 2026, the New York City chapter of the DSA formally endorsed Ocasio-Cortez for reelection. According to unofficial election-night results, Ocasio-Cortez defeated Felipe Garcia and Marty Dolan in the June 23 Democratic primary, receiving 30,189 votes. She advanced to the general election against Republican nominee Diamant Hysenaj.

=== Tenure ===
Ocasio-Cortez's maiden speech as a Representative, addressing the 2018–2019 United States federal government shutdown

Taking office at age 29 in 2019, Ocasio-Cortez was the youngest woman ever to serve in the United States Congress, and also the youngest member of the 116th Congress.

When the 116th Congress convened on January 3, 2019, Ocasio-Cortez entered with no seniority but with a large social media presence. Axios credited her with "as much social media clout as her fellow freshman Democrats combined". In December 2024, she became the first Bluesky user to reach one million followers. Her colleagues appointed her to teach them social media lessons upon her arrival in Congress. In July 2019, two lawsuits were filed against her for blocking Joey Salads and Dov Hikind on Twitter in light of the Second Circuit Court of Appeals ruling that it was a violation of the First Amendment for President Trump to block people on Twitter. On November 4, 2019, it was announced that the lawsuit had been settled; Ocasio-Cortez issued an apology.

In a 2019 interview, Ocasio-Cortez said she had stopped using her private Facebook account and was minimizing her usage of all social media accounts and platforms, calling them a "public health risk".

==== Arrival ====
In November 2018, on the first day of congressional orientation, Ocasio-Cortez participated in a climate change protest outside the office of House Minority Leader Nancy Pelosi. Also that month, she backed Pelosi's bid to be Speaker of the House on the condition that Pelosi "remains the most progressive candidate for speaker".

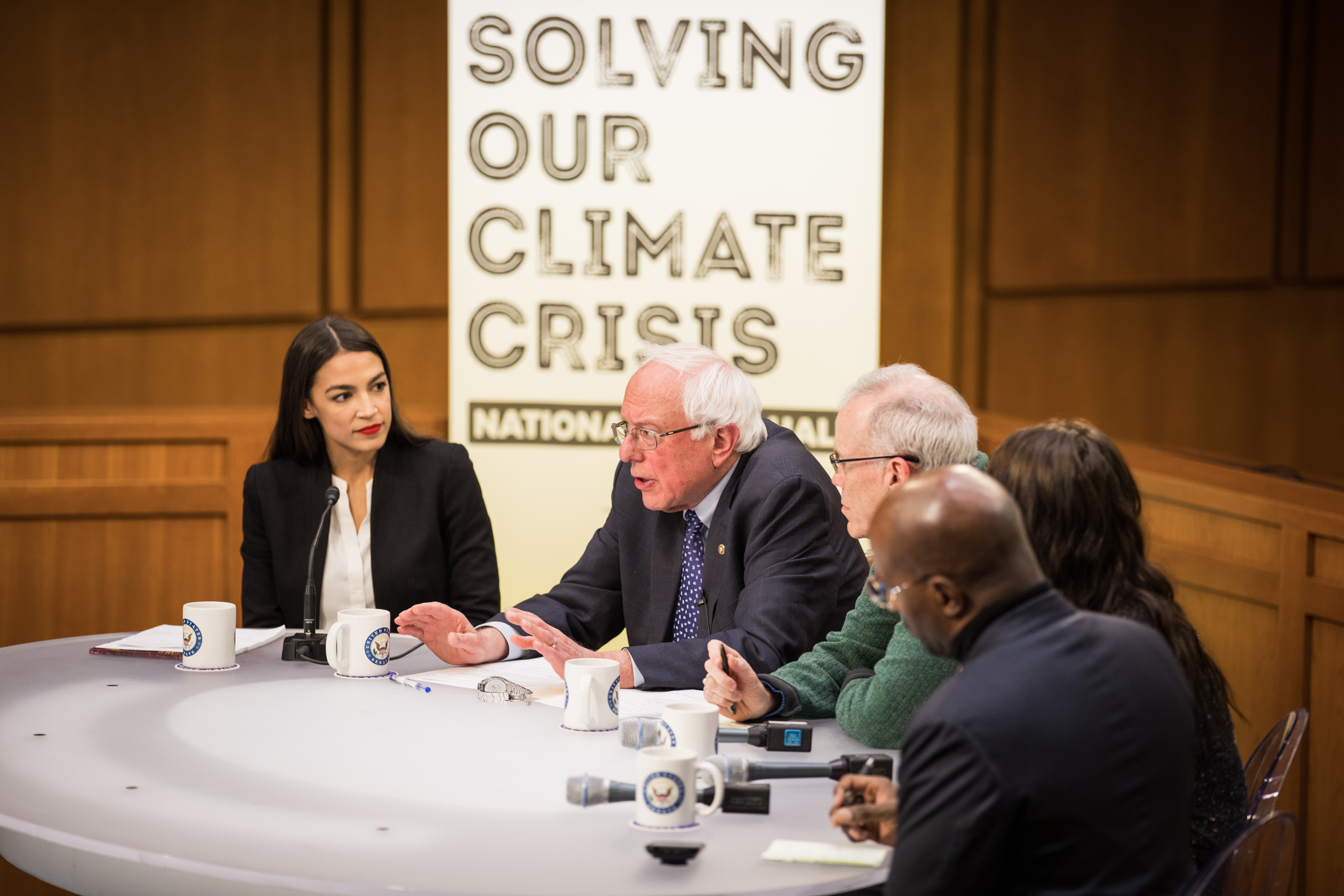
Ocasio-Cortez and Senator Bernie Sanders in December 2018

When Ocasio-Cortez made her first speech on the floor of Congress in January 2019, C-SPAN tweeted the video. Within 12 hours, the video of her speech set the record as C-SPAN's most-watched Twitter video of a member of the House of Representatives.

==== Hearings ====
In February 2019, speaking at a congressional hearing with a panel of representatives from campaign finance watchdog groups, Ocasio-Cortez questioned the panel about ethics regulations as they apply to both the president and members of Congress. She asserted that no regulations prevent lawmakers "from being bought off by wealthy corporations". With more than 37.5 million views, the clip became the most-watched political video posted on Twitter.

When President Donald Trump's former lawyer Michael Cohen appeared before the Oversight Committee in February 2019, Ocasio-Cortez asked him whether Trump had inflated property values for bank or insurance purposes. Cohen's reply suggested that Trump may have committed tax fraud and bank fraud. The president of the American Constitution Society named Ocasio-Cortez as the committee member best at obtaining specific information from Cohen about Trump's "shady practices, along with a road map for how to find out more". The New York Times columnist David Brooks praised her questioning of Cohen. Cohen's testimony helped prompt an investigation by New York attorney general Letitia James, who later cited it when seeking compliance with investigative subpoenas. The resulting civil case found Trump and associated defendants liable for fraud and initially imposed approximately $355 million in disgorgement against Trump, plus interest and business restrictions. In August 2025, an appellate court vacated the monetary awards while otherwise affirming the judgment's injunctive relief.

==== Media coverage ====
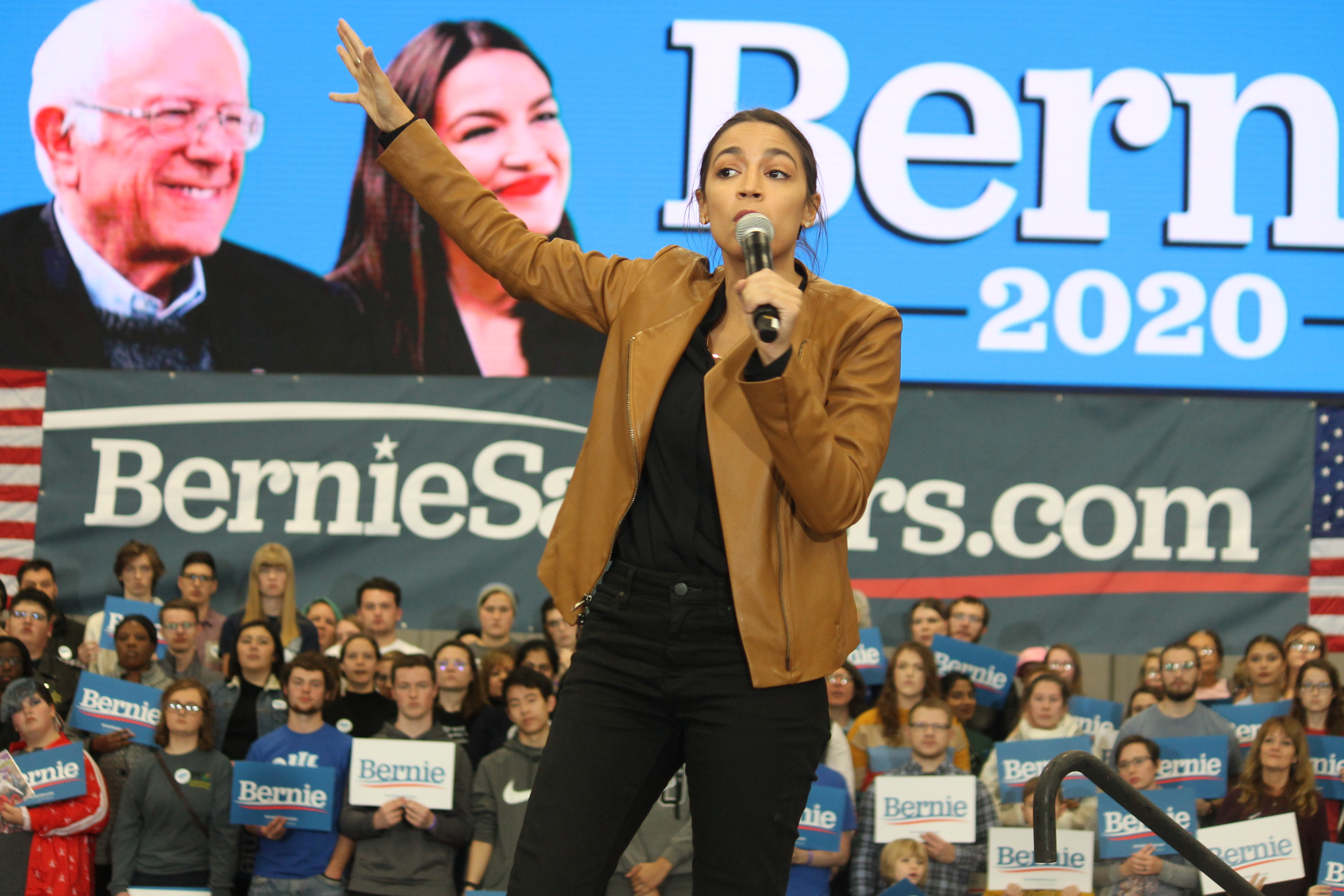
AOC at a Bernie Sanders rally in Council Bluffs, Iowa, 2019

According to reports in March 2019, Ocasio-Cortez continued to receive media coverage early in her congressional tenure on par with that of the 2020 presidential candidates and was considered "one of the faces of the Democratic party" and one of the most talked-about politicians in the United States. Between July 8 and 14, 2019, she drew more social media attention than the Democratic presidential candidates. Tracking company NewsWhip found that interactions with news articles on Ocasio-Cortez numbered 4.8 million, while no Democratic presidential candidate got more than 1.2 million. David Bauder of the Associated Press wrote that Trump's supporters were thus having "some success" in having "Ocasio-Cortez be top of mind when people think of" the Democratic Party.

According to a Media Matters for America study, Ocasio-Cortez was intensely discussed on sister television channels Fox News and Fox Business, being mentioned every day from February 25 to April 7, 2019, for a total of 3,181 mentions in 42 days. The Guardian's David Smith wrote that this is evidence that Fox is "obsessed by Ocasio-Cortez, portraying her as a radical socialist who threatens the American way of life". Brian Stelter of CNN Business found that between January and July 2019, she had nearly three times as many mentions on Fox News as on CNN and MSNBC. Stelter wrote that the attention Ocasio-Cortez is receiving has caused "the perception, particularly on the right, that her positions and policies are representative of the Democratic Party as a whole". In March 2019, Time said Ocasio-Cortez was the "second-most talked about politician" in the United States, after Trump, and called her "the Wonder Woman of the left".

In March 2019, PolitiFact reported that Ocasio-Cortez was "one of the most targeted politicians for hoax claims, despite the fact that she just entered Congress as a freshman". Fake quotes attributed to her, fake photos of her, and false rumors about her have spread on social media. Some of these have originated from 4chan and r/The_Donald. By July 2019, the fake material included attributing things Trump said to Ocasio-Cortez, such as "I have a very good brain and I've said lots of things." On July 18, 2019, Charlie Rispoli, a police officer from Gretna, Louisiana, posted on Facebook an apparent threat to shoot Ocasio-Cortez, calling her a "vile idiot" who "needs a round, and I don't mean the kind she used to serve" as a bartender. Rispoli posted the comment in response to a fake news article that falsely quoted Ocasio-Cortez as saying, "We pay soldiers too much". Rispoli was fired for his post and his Facebook account was deleted.

In a skincare tutorial for Vogue, Ocasio-Cortez said that beauty and femininity were important to her because they were often used against women in politics and society, and described self-love as a "mini protest" against misogynistic criticism.

===== Met Gala appearance =====
The "Tax the Rich" print from Ocasio-Cortez's 2021 Met Gala dress

Ocasio-Cortez attended the 2021 Met Gala, which had the theme "In America: A Lexicon of Fashion". The Met Gala is an annual fundraiser for the Metropolitan Museum of Art that is overseen by Vogue editor-in-chief Anna Wintour, who selects every invitee and designer pairing. Ocasio-Cortez wore an organza gown emblazoned with the phrase "Tax the Rich". As an elected official in New York City, she was considered a guest of the museum and, as such, did not have to buy a ticket, which cost at least $35,000 for attendees who were not invited public officials. In response, Ocasio-Cortez said her critics were using a sexist double standard and that she "punctured the fourth wall of excess and spectacle". Designer Aurora James said the event's wealthy attendees needed to see the message in person.

In September 2021, the American Accountability Foundation filed an ethics complaint against Ocasio-Cortez for attending the Met Gala. The AAF claimed that her attendance amounted to accepting an illegal gift since her estimated $35,000 ticket was paid for by Condé Nast, a for-profit company, not a charity. In July 2025, the House Ethics Committee found that Ocasio-Cortez had impermissibly accepted free admission for her partner and had not paid full fair-market value for some attire, accessories, and services associated with the gala. The committee found no evidence that the violations were knowing or willful and directed her to make additional payments totaling $2,983.28, after which it would consider the matter closed.

==== The Squad ====
Ocasio-Cortez is a member of an informal group of progressive members of Congress called "the Squad", initially including Ilhan Omar, Ayanna Pressley, and Rashida Tlaib. On July 14, 2019, Trump attacked the Squad (which had only four members at the time) in a tweet, saying that they should "go back and help fix" the countries they came from rather than criticize the American government. He continued to make similar comments over the next several days, even though three of the women, including Ocasio-Cortez, were born in the United States. Ocasio-Cortez responded in a tweet that "the President's words [yesterday], telling four American Congresswomen of color 'go back to your own country' is hallmark language of white supremacists." She later added, "We don't leave the things that we love, and when we love this country, what that means is that we propose the solutions to fix it." Days later, Trump falsely asserted that Ocasio-Cortez called "our country and our people 'garbage'"; she had actually said that Americans should not be content with moderate policies that are "10% better from garbage". Trump also falsely claimed that Ocasio-Cortez said "illegal immigrants are more American" than Americans who tried to keep them out; she actually said that "women and children on that border that are trying to seek refuge and opportunity" in America "are acting more American" than those who tried to keep them out. The Squad expanded after the 2020 and 2022 elections, with Jamaal Bowman, Cori Bush, Greg Casar, Summer Lee, and Delia Ramirez joining.

==== Green New Deal ====
H. Res. 109, "Recognizing the duty of the Federal Government to create a Green New Deal"

Ocasio-Cortez introduced the Green New Deal resolution in the House on February 7, 2019. She and Senator Ed Markey released a joint non-binding resolution laying out the main elements of a 10-year "economic mobilization" that "would phase out fossil fuel use and overhaul the nation's infrastructure". Their plan called for implementing the "social cost of carbon" that was part of the Obama administration's plans to address climate change. In the process, it aimed to create jobs. FAQ materials released by Ocasio-Cortez's office alongside the resolution called for "completely ditching fossil fuels, upgrading or replacing 'every building' in the country and 'totally overhaul[ing] transportation' to the point where 'air travel stops becoming necessary'". Her office later said that an unfinished FAQ draft had been posted on its website by mistake. The materials set a goal of achieving net-zero greenhouse-gas emissions within ten years, explaining: "We set a goal to get to net-zero, rather than zero emissions, in 10 years because we aren't sure that we'll be able to fully get rid of farting cows and airplanes that fast." Activist groups such as Greenpeace and the Sunrise Movement came out in favor of the plan. No Republican lawmakers voiced support. The plan gained support from some Democratic senators, including Elizabeth Warren, Bernie Sanders, and Cory Booker; other Democrats, such as Senator Dianne Feinstein and House speaker Nancy Pelosi, dismissed the proposal (Pelosi has referred to it as "the green dream, or whatever they call it").

On March 26, Senate Republicans called for an early vote on the Green New Deal without allowing discussion or expert testimony. Markey said Republicans were trying to "make a mockery" of the debate and called the vote a "sham". In protest, Senate Democrats voted "present" or against the resolution, resulting in a 57–0 defeat on the Senate floor.

In March 2019, a group of UK activists proposed that the Labour Party adopt a similar plan, "Labour for a Green New Deal". The group said it was inspired by the Sunrise Movement and the work Ocasio-Cortez had done in the U.S.

=== Harassment ===
External videos
- Rep. Alexandria Ocasio-Cortez (D-NY) Responds to Rep. Ted Yoho (R-FL), C-SPAN, 10:24, July 23, 2020

On July 20, 2020, U.S. representatives Ted Yoho and Roger Williams accosted Ocasio-Cortez on the Capitol steps, where Yoho (as overheard by a journalist) called her "disgusting" and told her "You are out of your freaking mind" for recently suggesting that poverty and unemployment were driving a spike in crime in New York City during the COVID-19 pandemic amid her ongoing advocacy for cutting police budgets. Ocasio-Cortez told Yoho that he was being "rude". As she walked away from Yoho into the Capitol, Yoho called her a "fucking bitch". Yoho addressed the matter on the House floor and, without naming Ocasio-Cortez, apologized for the "abrupt manner of the conversation" with her, claiming that "offensive name calling, words attributed to me by the press, were never spoken to my colleagues", and concluding: "I cannot apologize for my passion". Ocasio-Cortez responded with a speech saying that the incident was emblematic of a "culture ... accepting of violence and violent language against women ... In using that language, in front of the press, he gave permission to use that language against his wife, his daughters, women in his community, and I am here to stand up to say that is not acceptable."

In November 2021, Representative Paul Gosar posted a version of the title sequence of the anime series Attack on Titan on social media that he had edited with the faces of Ocasio-Cortez, Joe Biden, and himself superimposed on the show's characters, depicting Gosar attacking them with swords and killing Ocasio-Cortez. Speaker Nancy Pelosi called for law enforcement and the House Ethics Committee to investigate it as a threat. Pelosi opened discussion on the House floor, saying that Gosar's actions demanded a response: "We cannot have members joking about murdering each other or threatening the president of the United States. This is both an indictment of our elected officials and an insult to the institution of the House of Representatives. It's not just about us as members of Congress. It is a danger that it represents to everyone in the country." When Republican House members refused to condemn the video, Ocasio-Cortez responded that she believed the video was "part of a pattern that normalizes violence", adding, "I believe this is a part of a concerted strategy and I think it's very important for us to draw a strict line, a strong line for material consequence". She gave a six-minute floor speech, saying, "This is not about me. This is not about Representative Gosar. This is about what we're willing to accept." The House voted to censure Gosar, mostly along party lines. The last time the House had censured a lawmaker was in 2010.

=== January 6 Capitol attack ===
In a nearly 90-minute Instagram Live video made in February 2021, Ocasio-Cortez said that she had previously experienced sexual assault, and recounted her experience of fear during the 2021 storming of the United States Capitol, when she was in her office (in the Cannon House Office Building). She said she had hidden in her office bathroom before being startled by a Capitol Police officer who entered her office suite and shouted "Where is she?" before ordering her and her staff to evacuate to a different House Office Building. Ocasio-Cortez said the officer did not self-identify, and said she first believed the officer's voice was that of an attacker. She described sheltering in place in Representative Katie Porter's office and preparing for what she believed would be an assault by rioters on their offices. She said, "I had a very close encounter where I thought I was going to die." She later said in an interview with Dana Bash, "I didn't think that I was just going to be killed." When Bash asked whether she thought she was going to be raped, she answered in the affirmative.

=== 2024 Democratic National Convention ===
Ocasio-Cortez gave her first major convention speech in a prime-time slot at the 2024 Democratic National Convention. She expressed support for the Harris–Walz campaign and heavily criticized Trump, calling him a union buster who would "sell this country for a dollar if it meant lining his own pockets and greasing the palms of his Wall Street friends". Ocasio-Cortez addressed the Gaza war, saying Harris was "working tirelessly" for a ceasefire and hostage deal. Politico wrote that Ocasio-Cortez was one of the party's "most celebrated stars" and that the establishment acknowledged it. The speech also led to speculation about whether Ocasio-Cortez would run for higher office.

=== Committee leadership bid ===
In December 2024, Ocasio-Cortez ran for ranking member of the House Oversight Committee, but lost to the more senior Gerry Connolly, 131–84 in the House Democratic Caucus. She emphasized her platform and communication skills while running, while Connolly's supporters highlighted his experience. When Connolly announced in May 2025 that he was leaving his position because his cancer had returned, Ocasio-Cortez declined to run again, saying, "It's actually clear to me that the underlying dynamics in the caucus have not shifted with respect to seniority".

=== Second Trump administration ===
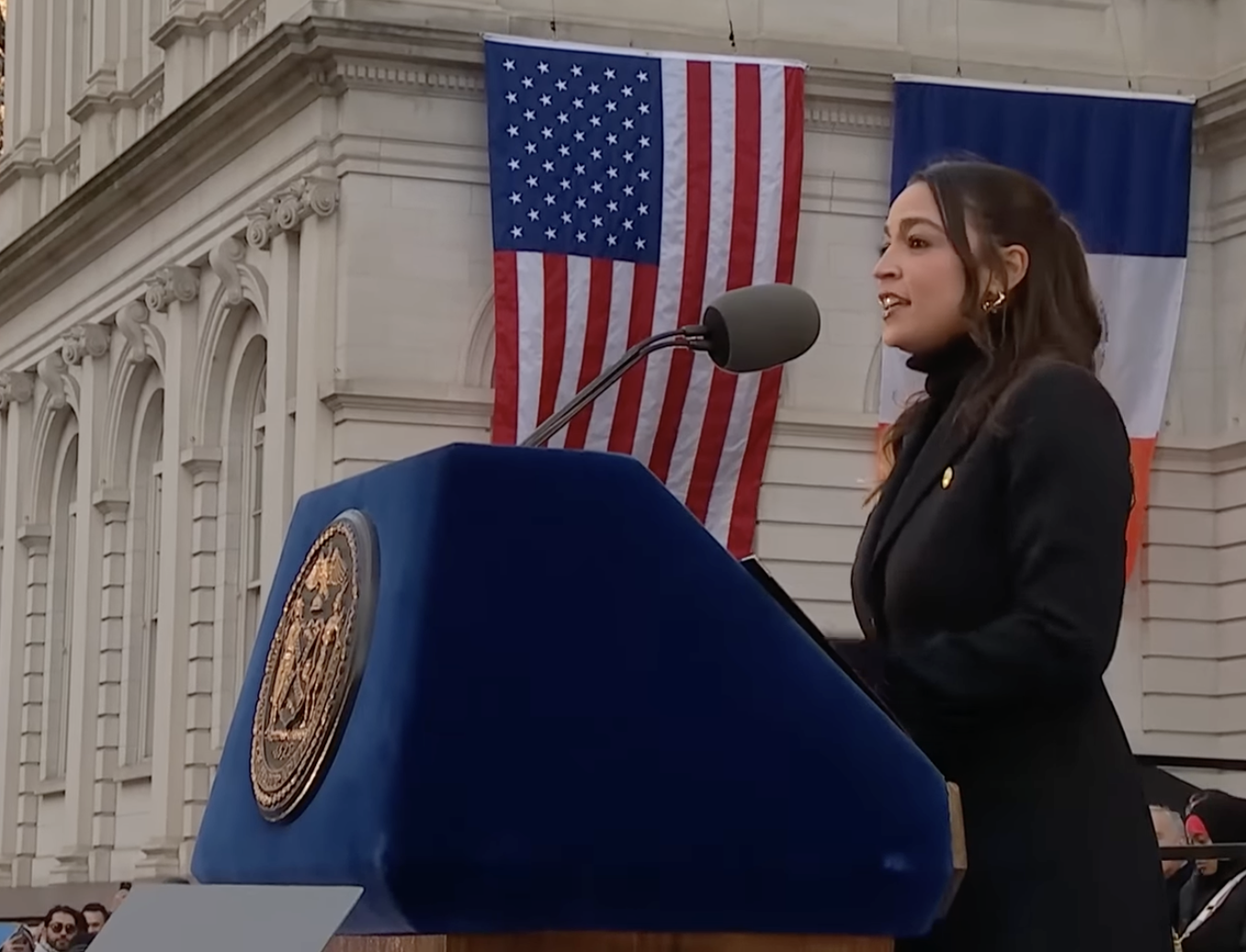
Ocasio-Cortez at Zohran Mamdani's inauguration

In February 2025, "border czar" Tom Homan called Ocasio-Cortez "the dumbest congresswoman ever" and accused her of "educat[ing] criminal illegal aliens" after her efforts to teach people their rights, separately suggesting that she could be "in trouble" legally. She responded by saying that "this is why you fight these cowards", arguing her efforts were protected under the Fourth Amendment.

In March 2025, Ocasio-Cortez spoke out against the federal budget proposal, saying it would empower Trump and Elon Musk, and urged Democrats to vote against it. When Schumer announced he would vote for the bill to avoid a government shutdown, she called it "a tremendous mistake" and criticized Senate Democrats for allowing it. Several House Democrats, including Ro Khanna, urged Ocasio-Cortez to challenge Schumer in the Democratic primary for the 2028 New York Senate elections.

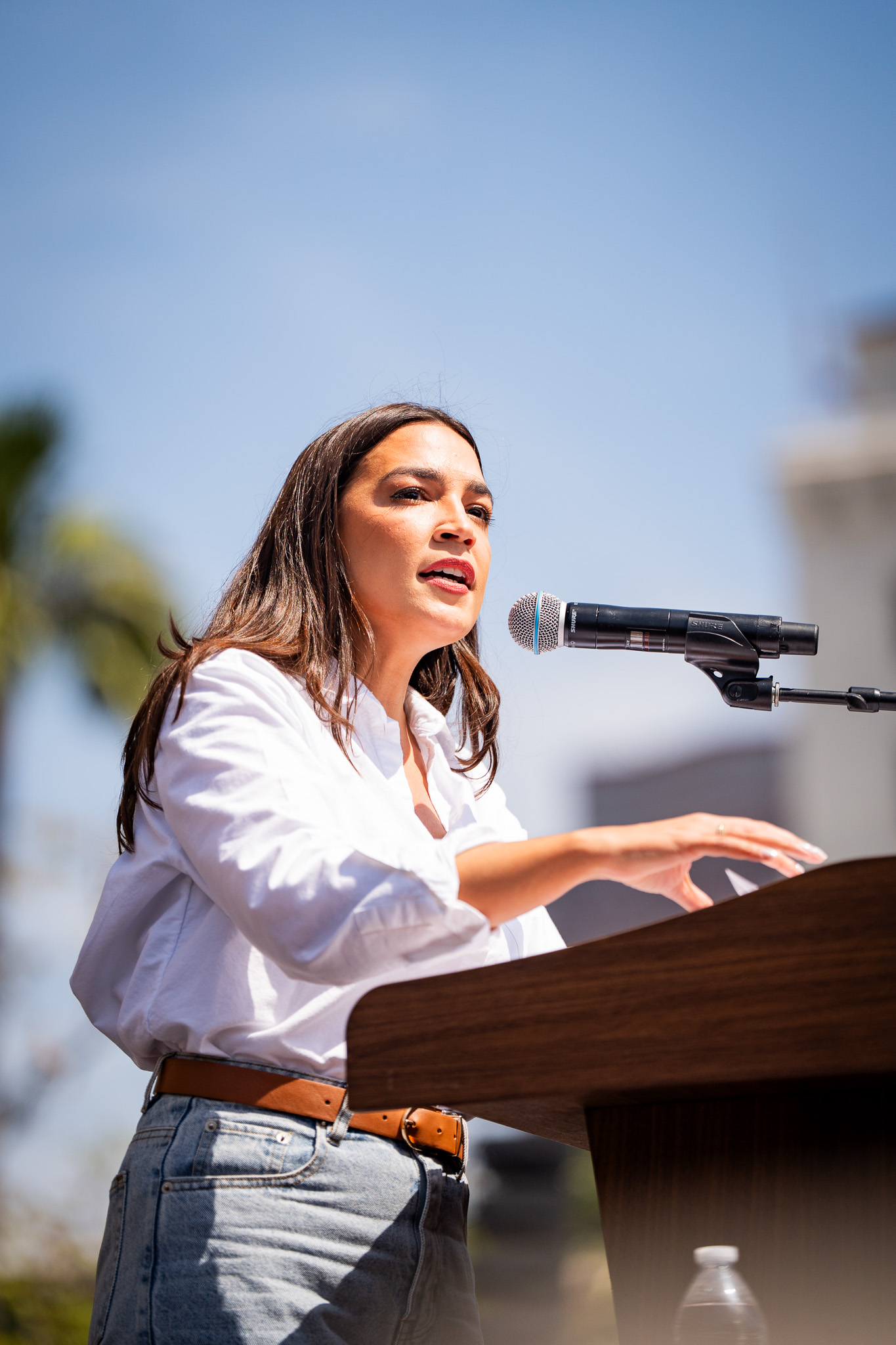
Ocasio-Cortez on the Fighting Oligarchy Tour in Los Angeles, California

Later that month, Ocasio-Cortez joined Sanders on the "Fighting Oligarchy Tour", giving speeches opposing Trump's policies in multiple cities. She said that Trump's tariff policy was "disastrous" and market manipulation, called Trump's immigration crackdown "authoritarian", criticized activist detentions, drew attention to economic inequality, and called for the "courage to brawl for the working class". Ocasio-Cortez became increasingly viewed as a possible successor to Sanders and a candidate for the 2028 presidential election. In the first quarter of 2025, she raised $9.6 million with an average donation of $21, more than she had ever received. In May 2025, Harris called her someone who was "speaking with moral clarity about this moment", Vice President JD Vance told Fox News that Ocasio-Cortez running for president was "the stuff of nightmares", and Trump said that she had charisma but questioned her debating skills. In June 2025, she endorsed Zohran Mamdani in the New York City Democratic mayoral primary. Politico described her endorsement as highly sought after among liberal Democrats nationwide and said that her reach had expanded since the last mayoral race.

=== Other issues ===
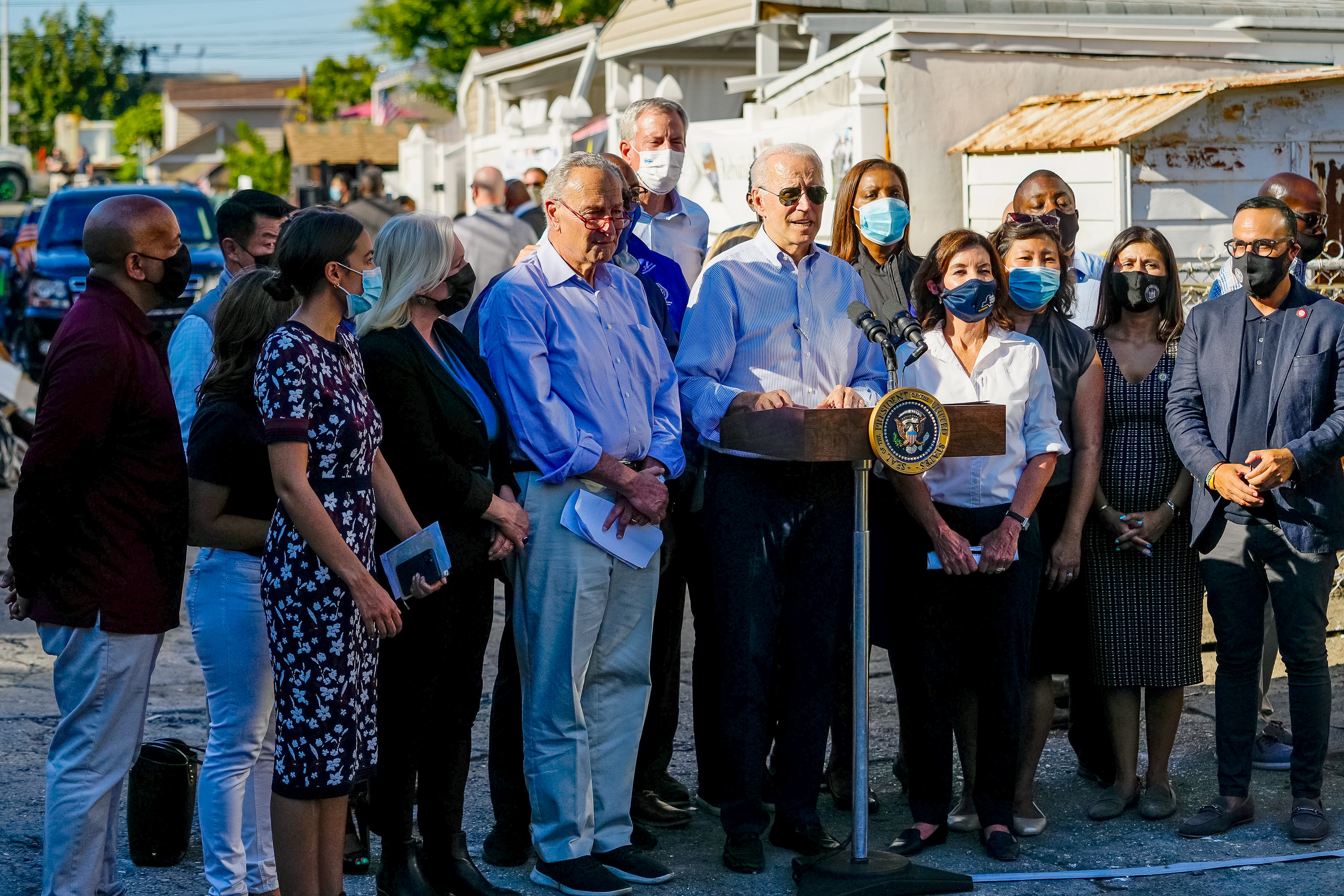
Ocasio-Cortez looks on as President Joe Biden speaks about the administration's response to Hurricane Ida on September 7, 2021

Ocasio-Cortez reacted to the 2021 Texas power crisis by organizing a fundraiser to provide food, water, and shelter to affected Texans. The fundraiser, which began on February 18, raised $2 million in its first day and $5 million by February 21. The money was given to organizations such as the Houston Food Bank and the North Texas Food Bank. Ocasio-Cortez also traveled to Houston to help volunteers with recovery.

On April 15, 2021, Ocasio-Cortez and three members of Congress held a press conference to announce a bill that they had introduced to implement postal banking pilot programs in rural and low-income urban neighborhoods where millions of households cannot access or afford standard banking services. Ocasio-Cortez described the families she sees in her urban community who need to rely on check-cashing companies that charge exorbitant interest rates due to the absence of mainstream banks. "They'll show up to a check cashing place and imagine cashing your stimulus check...and having 10 to 20% of that check taken away from you."

On November 5, 2021, Ocasio-Cortez was one of six House Democrats to break with their party and vote against the Infrastructure Investment and Jobs Act, as it was decoupled from the social safety net provisions in the Build Back Better Act.

In September 2022, Ocasio-Cortez was asked about running for president. She said, "I hold two contradictory things [in mind] at the same time. One is just the relentless belief that anything is possible. But at the same time, my experience here has given me a front-row seat to how deeply and unconsciously, as well as consciously, so many people in this country hate women. And they hate women of color. People ask me questions about the future. And realistically, I can't even tell you if I'm going to be alive in September [of 2022]. And that weighs very heavily on me. And it's not just the right wing. Misogyny transcends political ideology: left, right, center."

In May 2023, Ocasio-Cortez was part of a bipartisan group, including Matt Gaetz, Brian Fitzpatrick, and Raja Krishnamoorthi, that introduced the "Bipartisan Restoring Faith in Government Act". The bill would bar members of Congress from owning or trading individual stocks. In 2025, she was one of 16 original cosponsors of the Restore Trust in Congress Act (H.R. 5106), introduced on September 3 by Chip Roy. As of July 2026, the bill had 128 cosponsors. It would ban members of Congress and their spouses and dependents from owning or trading individual stocks.

In June 2024, following reports that Clarence Thomas accepted undisclosed gifts from conservatives, Ocasio-Cortez said the Court was "corrupted by money and extremism" and undemocratic. She and Representative Jamie Raskin led a congressional meeting about the Court, and explored options for holding justices accountable. On June 25, they introduced the "High Court Gift Ban Act", which would impose restrictions on the gifts given to justices.

In July 2024, Ocasio-Cortez supported and co-led the "DEFIANCE Act", which would allow people to sue creators and distributors of non-consensual deepfake pornography of themselves, something that had previously been done to her.

Ocasio-Cortez introducing articles of impeachment for Samuel Alito and Clarence Thomas in 2024

On July 1, after the Supreme Court ruled in Trump v. United States that presidents have immunity from criminal prosecution for official actions, Ocasio-Cortez announced she would file articles of impeachment against justices. She said the court was corrupt and that Congress must defend the nation against an "authoritarian capture". On July 10, Ocasio-Cortez officially introduced articles of impeachment against Justices Clarence Thomas and Samuel Alito, cosponsored by seven House Democrats. The resolution accused the justices of failing to recuse themselves from cases despite personal bias and of not disclosing lavish gifts they received. The resolution cited Ginni Thomas's involvement in attempts to overturn the 2020 United States presidential election and the presence of "Stop the Steal" symbols on Alito's properties as personal bias. In a statement, she said that corruption in the court had become a constitutional crisis that threatened democracy. Legal experts said the case would likely fail, but was still important because it drew attention to the justices' conduct.

In February 2026, Ocasio-Cortez attended the 62nd Munich Security Conference in Munich, Germany. She argued that liberal democracies must deliver "material gains for the working class" to resist authoritarian movements and said that Trump's foreign policy sought to create "an age of authoritarianism" by replacing the rules-based order with spheres of influence. She described the war in Gaza as a genocide and said that Western powers' inconsistent application of the rules-based order weakened democracies. At the conference, when asked whether the United States should commit troops to defend Taiwan against a Chinese invasion, Ocasio-Cortez paused before referring to the United States' longstanding policy and saying that the goal should be to avoid reaching that point. Later during the trip, at an event at the Technical University of Berlin, she incorrectly said that Venezuela was "below the equator".

=== Committee assignments ===
- Committee on Energy and Commerce (2025–present)
  - Subcommittee on Energy
  - Subcommittee on Health
  - Subcommittee on Oversight and Investigations

Past committee assignments

- Committee on Oversight and Accountability (2019–2025; vice ranking member, 2023–2025)
- Committee on Financial Services (2019–2023)
- Committee on Natural Resources (2023–2025)
  - Subcommittee on Energy and Mineral Resources (ranking member, 2023–2025)

=== Caucus memberships ===
Ocasio-Cortez's caucus memberships include the House Pro-Choice Caucus, Democratic Women's Caucus, Congressional Hispanic Caucus, Congressional Progressive Caucus, Congressional Equality Caucus, Congressional Bangladesh Caucus, Congressional Labor Caucus, Congressional Albanian Issues Caucus, Sustainable Energy and Environment Coalition, Congressional Addiction Treatment and Recovery Caucus, Congressional Renters Caucus, Congressional Brazil Caucus, Medicare for All Caucus, and Quiet Skies Caucus. In May 2026, she co-founded and became a co-chair of the End Corruption Caucus with representatives Jason Crow and Mike Levin.

== Political positions ==
Ocasio-Cortez has been described as progressive, left-wing, left-wing populist, and far-left.

=== Economic policy ===
"I believe that in a modern, moral and wealthy society, no person in America should be too poor to live."

— Ocasio-Cortez, June 29, 2018

Ocasio-Cortez has rejected state socialism, calling it "undemocratic" and "easily corrupted", and has argued from a liberal socialist framework in support of unionization and worker cooperatives. She has argued that free-market economies and democratic socialism are compatible, citing cooperatives as a model.

Ocasio-Cortez supports raising the marginal tax rate on top income earners to fund the implementation of her policy goals. She was among the 46 House Democrats who voted against final passage of the Fiscal Responsibility Act of 2023. Ocasio-Cortez has called for reducing defense spending. In December 2022, she was the only House Democrat to vote against an omnibus spending package because it increased funding for defense and federal agencies that oversee immigration.

In late 2020, Ocasio-Cortez and Rashida Tlaib proposed a public banking bill to encourage creation of state and local public banks by giving them access to facilities from the Federal Reserve and setting national guidelines on public banking. In April 2021, Ocasio-Cortez announced a bill that she and three senators had introduced to implement postal banking pilot programs in rural and low-income urban neighborhoods where millions of households cannot access or afford standard banking services.

Ocasio-Cortez has been a vocal supporter of labor rights, including a $15 hourly federal minimum wage. In May 2019, she returned to bartending at the Queensboro Restaurant in Jackson Heights, Queens, to promote the Raise the Wage Act, which would increase the minimum hourly wage for restaurant servers and other tipped workers from $2.13 to $15. Speaking to restaurant workers, customers, and reporters, she criticized an exemption in the U.S. minimum-wage law for restaurants and the service sector that allows them to be paid less than $7.25 per hour, saying, "Any job that pays $2.13 per hour is not a job, it is indentured servitude." On January 20, 2021, Ocasio-Cortez skipped the inauguration of Joe Biden to join the 2021 Hunts Point Produce Market strike in the Bronx.

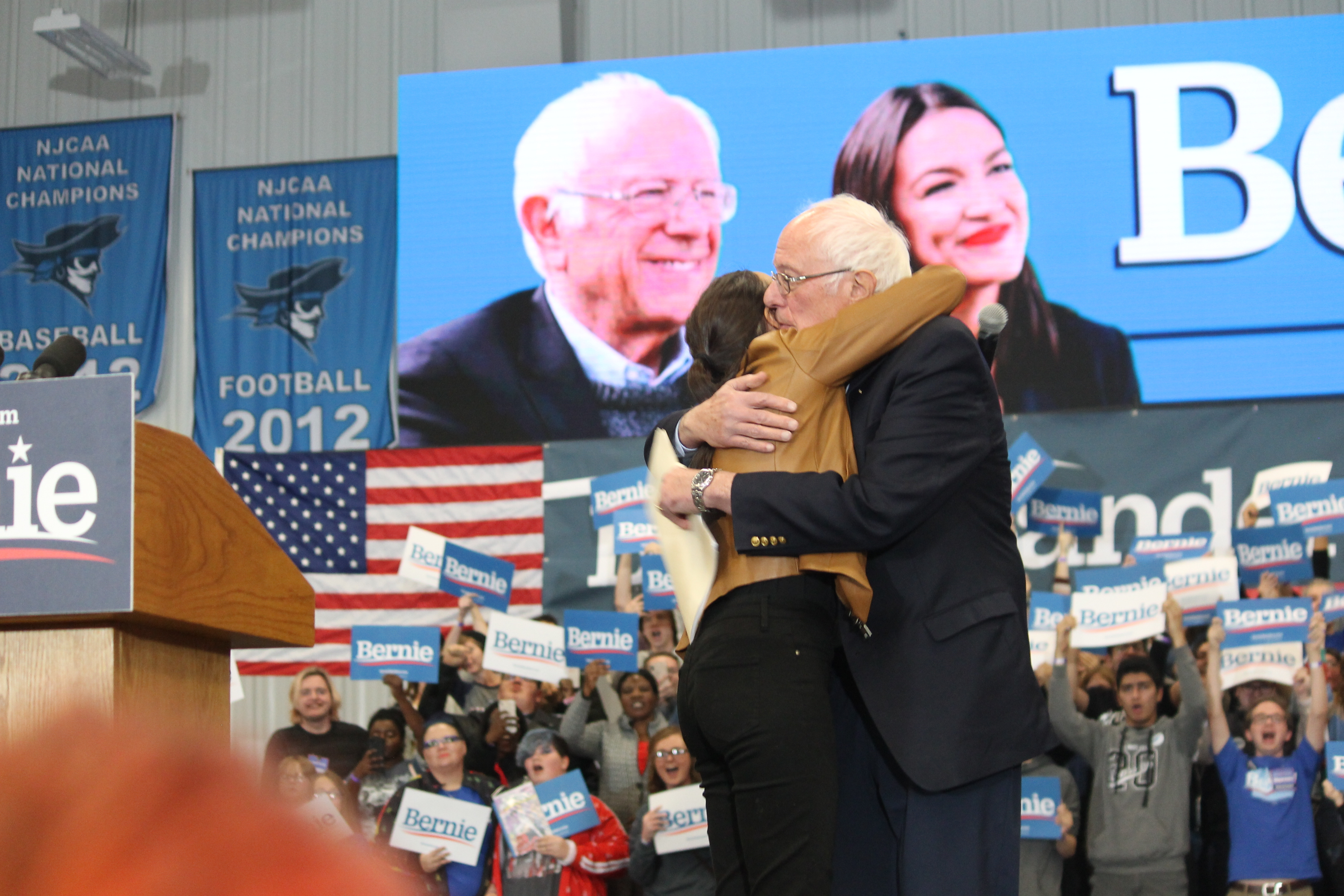
Ocasio-Cortez and Bernie Sanders in 2019

In September 2019, Ocasio-Cortez introduced a poverty-reduction policy proposal (packaged in a bundle called "A Just Society") that would take into account the cost of childcare, health care, and "new necessities" like Internet access when measuring poverty. The proposal would cap annual rent increases and ensure access to social welfare programs for people with convictions and undocumented immigrants.

Ocasio-Cortez has proposed a marginal tax rate as high as 70% on income above $10 million to pay for the Green New Deal. According to tax experts contacted by The Washington Post, this tax would bring in extra revenue of $720 billion per decade. Ocasio-Cortez has opposed and voted against the pay-as-you-go rule supported by Democratic leaders, which requires deficit-neutral fiscal policy, with all new expenditures balanced by tax increases or spending cuts. She and Representative Ro Khanna have condemned the rule for hamstringing new or expanded progressive policies. Drawing a parallel with the Great Depression, she has argued that the Green New Deal needs deficit spending like the original New Deal.

Ocasio-Cortez opposed a planned deal by New York City to give Amazon.com $3 billion in state and city subsidies and tax breaks to build a secondary headquarters (Amazon HQ2) that was expected to bring in $27 billion in tax revenue for the city and state, in an area near her congressional district, saying that the city should instead itself invest $3 billion in the district. Conservative columnist Marc Thiessen argued that "New York does not have $3 billion in cash" it would "give" to Amazon, and that between 25,000 and 40,000 new jobs, in addition to the high-paying tech jobs Amazon would have created, disappeared when Amazon left and "her economic illiteracy is dangerous" because "by helping to drive Amazon away, she did not save New York $3 billion; she cost New York $27 billion." After Amazon delayed construction of the second phase of its Virginia headquarters, Ocasio-Cortez reiterated her opposition to the New York subsidy proposal. The progressive think tank Data for Progress wrote that New York taxpayers "would be subsidizing Amazon's activities in the city by surrendering $3 billion in would-be tax revenue", that there were "enormous hidden costs associated with Amazon's residence" and that "the argument that the city would not literally pay cash to Amazon is superficial and semantic". Data for Progress also noted that Amazon instead announced it would bring 1,500 jobs to New York without a tax break. Former New York mayor Mike Bloomberg also opposed the tax breaks.

In 2024, Ocasio-Cortez took part in a live-streamed roundtable with Federal Trade Commission chair Lina Khan, discussing "efforts to check unlawful corporate power". Later, in response to investor and Harris supporter Mark Cuban saying he would not support keeping Khan, Ocasio-Cortez wrote, "anyone goes near Lina Khan and there will be an out and out brawl".

=== Environment ===
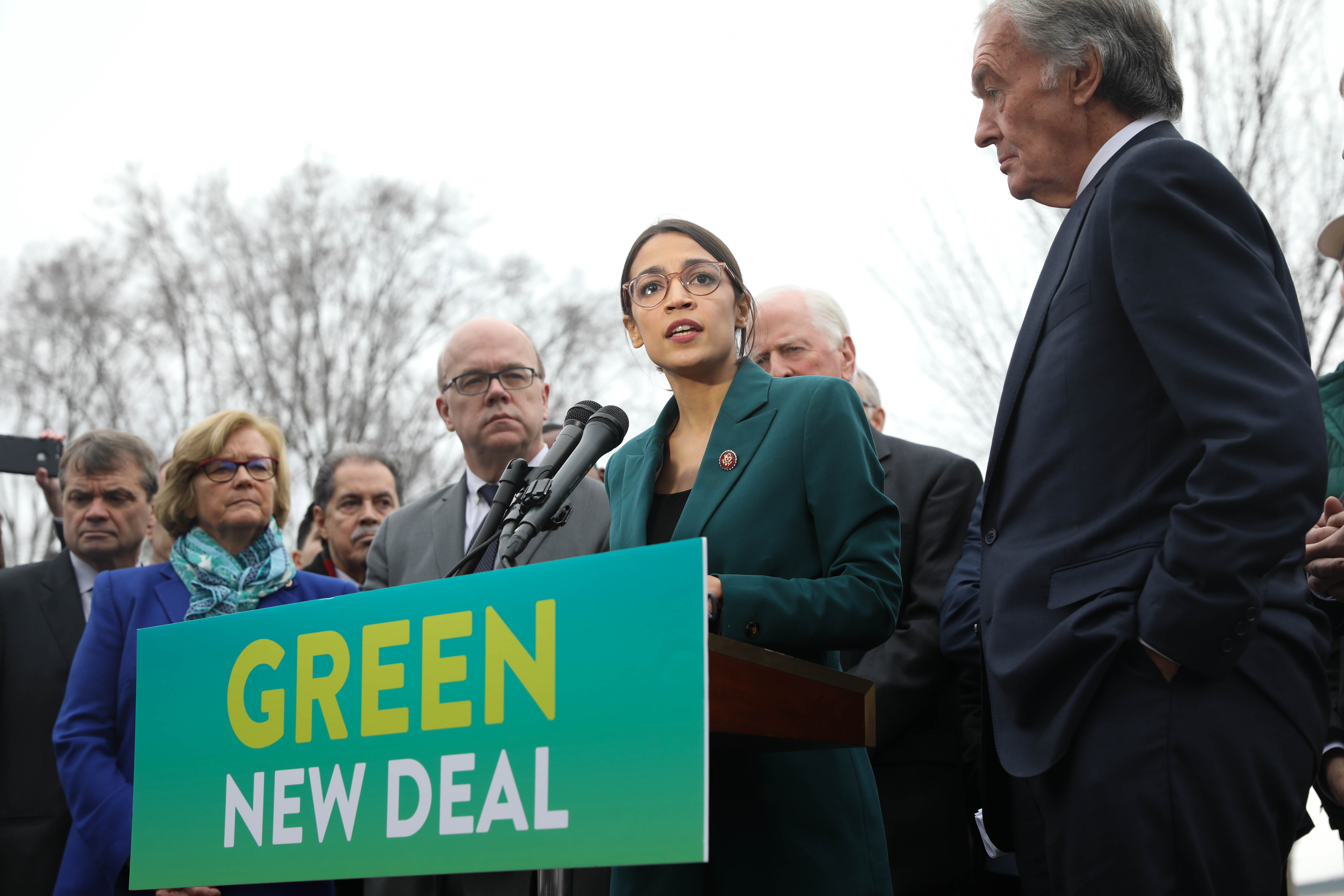
Ocasio-Cortez speaks on a Green New Deal in front of the Capitol Building in February 2019

Ocasio-Cortez has called for "more environmental hardliners in Congress", calling climate change "the single biggest national security threat for the United States and the single biggest threat to worldwide industrialized civilization". Referring to a 2018 United Nations report indicating that the effects of climate change could become irreversible unless carbon emissions are reined in within 12 years of the report's publication, she has argued that global warming must be addressed immediately to avert human extinction.

Ocasio-Cortez's environmental plan, the Green New Deal, advocates for the United States to transition to an electrical grid running on 100% renewable energy and to end the use of fossil fuels within ten years. The changes, estimated to cost roughly $2.5 trillion per year, would be financed in part by higher taxes on the wealthy. She has said she has an open mind about nuclear power's role in the Green New Deal.

In 2024, Ocasio-Cortez, supported by Bowman and Sanders, introduced the "Green New Deal for Public Housing", a plan to fund the New York City Housing Authority (NYCHA) and help it transition to clean energy.

In 2026, Ocasio-Cortez partnered with More Perfect Union to film a documentary about reports of contaminated well water near a 2,500,000 sq ft (230,000 m^{2}) Meta AI data center in Morgan County, Georgia, whose construction began in 2018. She suggested she was opposed to these data centers due to their environmental harm, saying she would support a national congressional inquiry and that some Morgan County residents had been forced to "ship water to their house [in a rural area] in order to cook and bathe themselves". She also said that AI data centers could adversely affect water supplies across entire states and criticized lobbyists who dismissed the problem as an "urban legend" or refused to acknowledge it. Locals said they had not had clean drinking water since construction of the data center began in 2018. To illustrate her concerns, Ocasio-Cortez brought two jars of dirty water from private citizens' wells in Morgan County to a hearing with United States Environmental Protection Agency (EPA) officials; after the hearing, EPA officials promised to investigate the issue.

=== Foreign policy ===
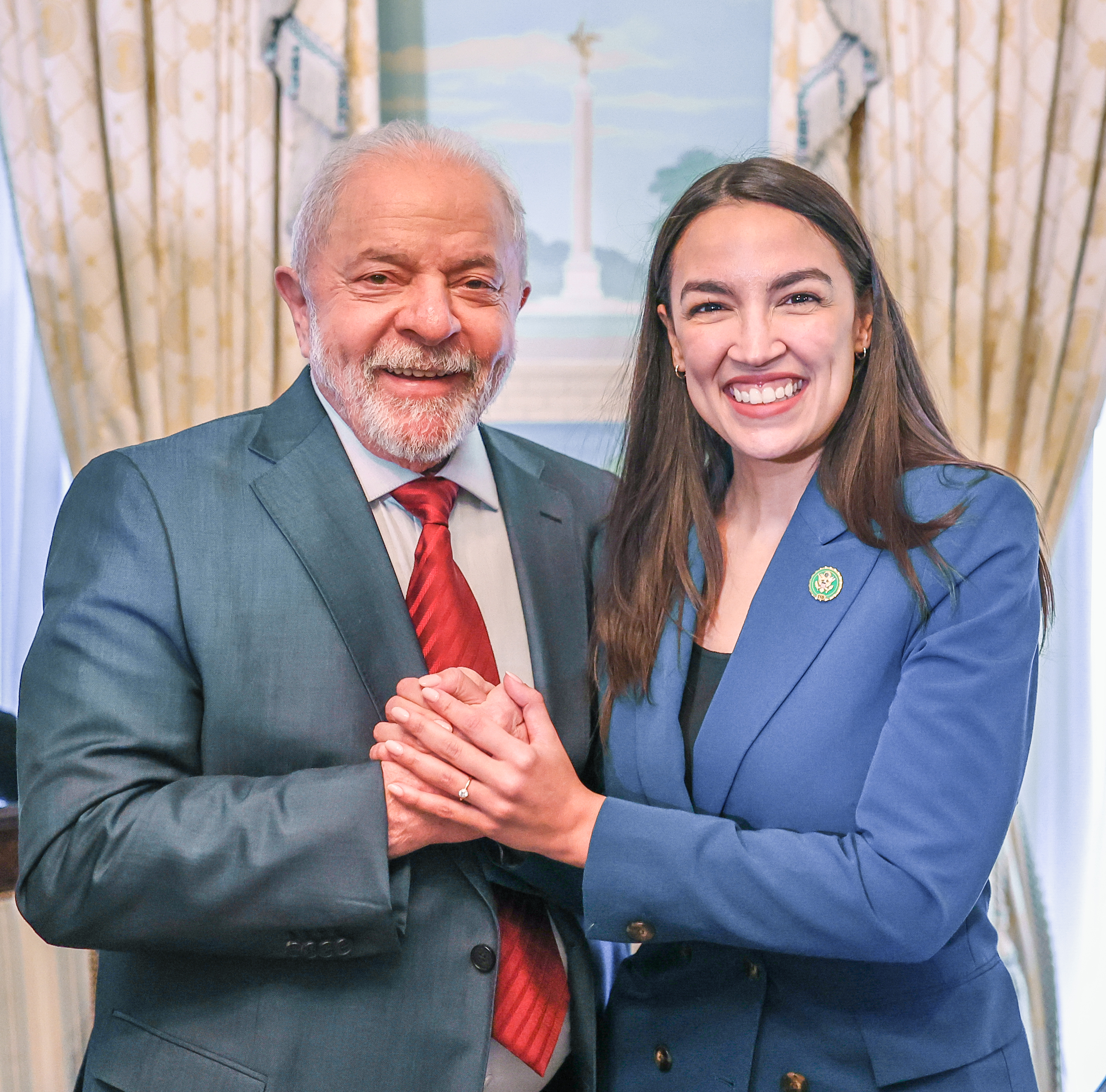
Ocasio-Cortez with Brazilian president Luiz Inácio Lula da Silva in February 2023

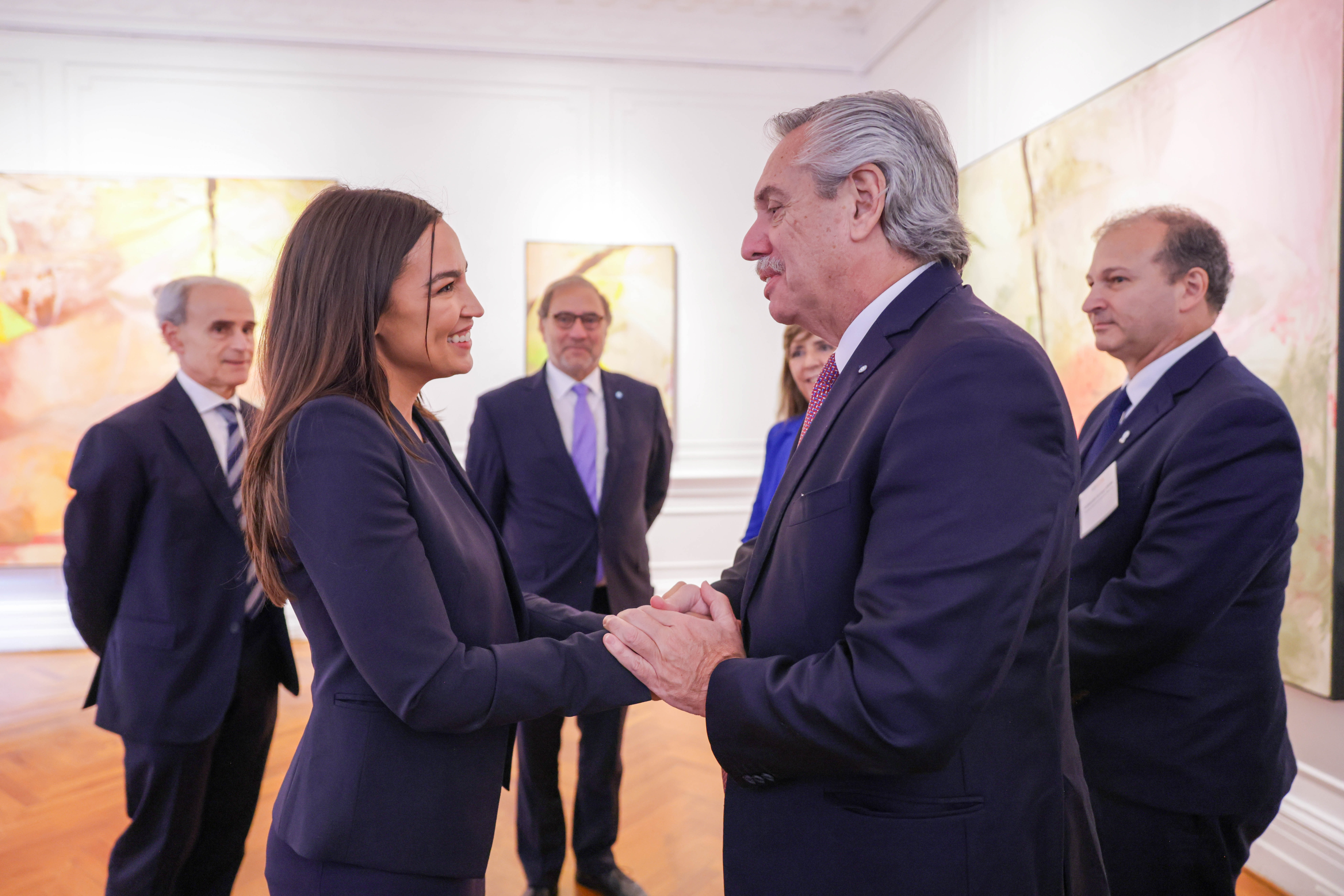
Ocasio-Cortez with Argentine president Alberto Fernández in September 2023

==== China ====
Ocasio-Cortez criticized the American companies Activision Blizzard and Apple for censoring pro-democracy protesters in Hong Kong. She co-signed a letter to Activision Blizzard CEO Bobby Kotick that read, "As China amplifies its campaign of intimidation, you and your company must decide whether to look beyond the bottom line and promote American values—like freedom of speech and thought—or to give in to Beijing's demands in order to preserve market access."

A bipartisan letter by Ocasio-Cortez and seven other lawmakers fiercely criticized the NBA's handling of a controversy involving a tweet by Houston Rockets general manager Daryl Morey supporting pro-democracy protesters in Hong Kong. The lawmakers wrote that the NBA's response not only "sold out an American citizen" but also "reinforces the Chinese Communist Party view that those who point to Chinese repression in Hong Kong are at best stating opinions, not facts", as well as being "a betrayal of fundamental American values".

==== Middle East ====
Ocasio-Cortez voted to withdraw U.S. military support for the Saudi Arabian-led intervention in Yemen, and she was among 56 Democrats to vote in favor of H.Con.Res. 21, which directed President Joe Biden to remove U.S. troops from Syria within 180 days.

Ocasio-Cortez criticized the Trump administration for escalating tensions with Iran, saying it would bring the U.S. into a "military conflict that is completely irresponsible".

Ocasio-Cortez supported the Mahsa Amini protests, saying, "Mahsa Amini was senselessly murdered by the same patriarchal and autocratic forces repressing women the world over" and that the "right to choose belongs to us all, from hijabs to reproductive care".

In 2025, Ocasio-Cortez opposed American strikes on Iranian nuclear sites, calling them "absolutely and clearly grounds for impeachment".

==== Israel–Palestine ====
Ocasio-Cortez supports a two-state solution to the Israeli–Palestinian conflict and opposes the occupation of the West Bank. She was one of 17 representatives to vote against a resolution condemning the Global Boycott, Divestment, and Sanctions Movement. She was also one of nine progressive Democrats to vote against a resolution that read "the State of Israel is not a racist or apartheid state" and "the United States will always be a staunch partner and supporter of Israel". In 2021, she said of Israel, "Apartheid states aren't democracies."

Ocasio-Cortez condemned the October 7 attacks, calling them "horrifying attacks against innocent civilians". She has called Israel's subsequent assault on Gaza and the Gaza Strip famine a genocide and advocates halting weapons transfers to Israel because of it. She boycotted Israeli prime minister Benjamin Netanyahu's 2024 speech to Congress, calling him a war criminal.

Ocasio-Cortez cosponsored the Block the Bombs Act, which would restrict transfers of specified defense articles and defense services to Israel. She also voted for Thomas Massie's unsuccessful amendment to prohibit funding for Israel under H.R. 8595 and reduce the Foreign Military Financing Program by $3.3 billion.

In September 2021, Ocasio-Cortez abruptly changed her vote from "no" to "present" on a bill providing funding for the Iron Dome, and in July 2025 she voted against an amendment that would have cut $500 million in Iron Dome funding. In both instances she faced criticism from the left for her votes. She maintains that she has never voted for aid to Israel because she voted against the overall defense spending bill that included the Iron Dome funding. At a March 2026 NYC-DSA forum, Ocasio-Cortez committed not to vote to fund weapons for Israel.

Ocasio-Cortez opposed funding cuts to the United Nations Relief and Works Agency for Palestine Refugees in the Near East (UNRWA) over allegations that certain staff members participated in the Hamas attacks. She has said the U.S. should not give Israel defensive weapons when it is "well able to fund" them, and that all military aid must be "consistent with the Leahy amendment", which restricts assistance to foreign security-force units credibly implicated in gross human-rights violations. During a panel discussion at the 62nd Munich Security Conference in Germany, Ocasio-Cortez said the situation in Gaza was "enabled by U.S. policy" and that the U.S. has a legal obligation to enforce its laws governing military assistance, including the Leahy laws. She argued that unconditional aid to Israel had contributed to avoidable civilian deaths, including women and children. Ocasio-Cortez has criticized pro-Israel lobbying organizations, particularly AIPAC, for their influence on U.S. electoral politics and foreign policy, calling AIPAC "racist and bigoted".

When asked what the Biden administration could have done better in the situation, Ocasio-Cortez said it could have enforced its red line on the Rafah offensive, investigated its weapons shipments to Israel, imposed tougher sanctions in response to the occupation of the West Bank, and reined in Benjamin Netanyahu. Later, she criticized the Biden administration's support of Israel and again called for an arms embargo.

==== Russia–Ukraine ====
Ocasio-Cortez called the 2022 Russian invasion of Ukraine "indefensible" and supported targeted sanctions on Vladimir Putin and his oligarchs. She also called on the U.S. to work with allies to prepare for a Ukrainian refugee crisis on a massive scale, and insisted that any military action take place with congressional approval.

Ocasio-Cortez introduced the Ukraine Comprehensive Debt Payment Relief Act, which would support the immediate suspension of Ukraine's debt payments and help coordinate comprehensive debt relief. She said the U.S. has "a moral obligation to assist any way we can".

In May 2022, Ocasio-Cortez voted for a $40.1 billion emergency aid package responding to Russia's invasion of Ukraine. Also that month, she drew criticism when she was one of only eight House members to vote against the Asset Seizure for Ukraine Reconstruction Act. She defended the vote by arguing that the bill directed the president to seize private property without due process, calling it "a risky new precedent in the event future presidents may seek to abuse that expansion of power". An Ocasio-Cortez spokesperson said that she had "participated in designing and voted for the toughest sanctions in recent memory".

Ocasio-Cortez has backed aid to Ukraine in its war against Russia. When a package combining Ukraine aid with military assistance to Israel came up for a vote, she opposed the bundled legislation, writing: "Ukraine aid should not be contingent on unconditional military aid to Netanyahu and the forced famine of Gazans. Decouple them and I'll sign on tomorrow. Ukraine aid on its own has the votes to pass, incl mine."

At the 62nd Munich Security Conference in February 2026, Ocasio-Cortez opposed any settlement that would reward Russian aggression, saying, "We shouldn't reward imperialism, and I don't think that we should allow Russia to continue, or any nation, to continue, violating a nation's sovereignty." She also accused the Trump administration of insufficient commitment to the defense of Ukraine and its European allies.

=== Governance ===
==== Judiciary ====
After the contentious confirmation of Supreme Court justice Amy Coney Barrett, Ocasio-Cortez urged Democratic presidential nominee Joe Biden to expand the court if he won and their party achieved a Senate majority. In April 2021, she supported a bill to increase the Court's size. She again called for expansion in September 2021 after the Court voted not to grant an emergency stay of the Texas Heartbeat Act.

In March 2022, Ocasio-Cortez called on Justice Clarence Thomas to resign over his wife's texts urging President Trump's chief of staff to overturn the 2020 presidential election, raising a possible impeachment effort if he did not. After the Supreme Court overturned Roe v. Wade in June 2022, Ocasio-Cortez called for the impeachment of justices Neil Gorsuch and Brett Kavanaugh. She alleged that the two had lied under oath about their views on Roe during their confirmation hearings.

In June 2022, after the Supreme Court made several consequential rulings and granted certiorari to Moore v. Harper, which could affect future elections, Ocasio-Cortez tweeted that the United States was "witnessing a judicial coup in progress". The next month, she claimed the Court had "gone rogue" and that impeachment, expansion, introduction of ethics rules and recusal requirements should be considered. She added that Thomas should certainly be impeached. Two days later, she led House progressives calling on the Democratic leadership in Congress to strip the Court of its jurisdiction "in the areas of abortion, marriage equality, non-procreative intimacy, and contraception". They pointed to Thomas's concurring opinion in Dobbs, which suggested revisiting cases that established a constitutional right to contraception, same-sex marriage, and gay sex.

==== Pay raises for Congress ====
In 2019, Ocasio-Cortez supported pay raises for Congress. She wrote, "It's not a fun or politically popular position to take. But consistency is important. ALL workers should get cost of living increases. That's why minimum wage should be pegged to inflation, too." Members of Congress make $174,000 annually; the speaker makes $223,500 and House leaders make $193,400. Republican Kevin McCarthy joined her in supporting the pay raise, saying he did not want Congress to be a place where only the wealthy can afford to serve. Colleagues such as Joe Cunningham opposed the measure, saying, "We didn't come up here to give ourselves a raise".

==== Trump impeachments ====
On June 28, 2018, Ocasio-Cortez told CNN she supported impeaching President Trump, citing Trump's alleged violations of the Emoluments Clause and saying, "we have to hold everyone accountable and that no person is above that law."

Ocasio-Cortez supported impeaching Trump a second time for his attempts to overturn the 2020 United States presidential election. On January 3, 2021, she said that the Trump–Raffensperger phone call constituted an impeachable offense, and called it a "despicable abuse of power". After January 6, she and many other Democrats cosponsored an article of impeachment against Trump. Ocasio-Cortez said that Trump should be permanently barred from office and impeached.

==== Andrew Cuomo scandals ====
In April 2020, Ocasio-Cortez was one of 77 representatives to call for public reports of data on COVID-19 cases in nursing homes and long-term care facilities. In March 2021, she and Representative Jamaal Bowman called on New York governor Andrew Cuomo to resign, citing the sexual misconduct allegations against him as well as the New York COVID-19 nursing home scandal about the Cuomo administration's reported undercounting of COVID-19 nursing home deaths.

==== Puerto Rico ====
Ocasio-Cortez has called for "solidarity with Puerto Rico". She has advocated for granting Puerto Ricans further civil rights, regardless of Puerto Rico's legal classification. She advocates for voting rights and disaster relief. Ocasio-Cortez was critical of FEMA's response to Hurricane Maria and the federal government's unwillingness to address Puerto Rico's political status. She believes the federal government should increase investment in Puerto Rico. In August 2020, Ocasio-Cortez and Nydia Velázquez introduced the Puerto Rico Self-Determination Act of 2020, which was referred to the House Committee on Natural Resources.

On March 18, 2021, Ocasio-Cortez, Velázquez, and Senator Bob Menendez introduced a new version, the Puerto Rico Self-Determination Act of 2021, with over 70 co-sponsors in the House and seven co-sponsors in the Senate, including one Republican.

==== Withdrawal of Biden ====
After the June 2024 presidential debate, Ocasio-Cortez, who previously supported Biden during the campaign, said that she had spoken with Biden and that he made clear he was staying in the race. She said that she supported him and that her focus was on defeating Republicans in the election. Later, on July 19, she held an Instagram Live in which she said that replacing Biden was risky and legally challenging, but suggested that nominating Vice President Kamala Harris was better than an open convention. When Biden withdrew from the race, she endorsed Harris.

=== Health care ===
Ocasio-Cortez supports transitioning to a single-payer healthcare system and considers medical care a human right. She has said that a single government health insurer should cover every American, reducing overall costs. Her campaign website says, "Almost every other developed nation in the world has universal healthcare. It's time the United States catch up to the rest of the world in ensuring all people have real healthcare coverage that doesn't break the bank." Many 2020 Democratic presidential candidates adopted the Medicare-for-all proposal.

In June 2019 and July 2021, Ocasio-Cortez proposed legislation that would remove restrictions placed on researching the medical use of psilocybin.

In 2024, Ocasio-Cortez said of the killing of UnitedHealthcare CEO Brian Thompson, "This is not to say that an act of violence is justified", adding, "people interpret and feel and experience denied claims as an act of violence against them".

Ocasio-Cortez is a vocal opponent of efforts to cut Medicaid. She said that a bill Republicans introduced would result in depriving 13.7 million people of Medicaid and create a situation where "once you are kicked off Medicaid, you then can't even buy your own health insurance", and that private health care premiums would "skyrocket". When Ocasio-Cortez raised concerns before the House Energy and Commerce Committee about the effects of the proposed work requirements on patients experiencing miscarriages or other medical emergencies, Representative Randy Weber told her to look toward Republicans rather than the camera. She replied, "There are 13.7 million Americans on the other side of that screen there", including in Republican districts, and "they deserve to see what is happening here". Weber then asked her to yield, to which she replied, "I will not yield because it was a terribly disrespectful comment, and I will not yield to disrespectful men".

=== Social issues ===
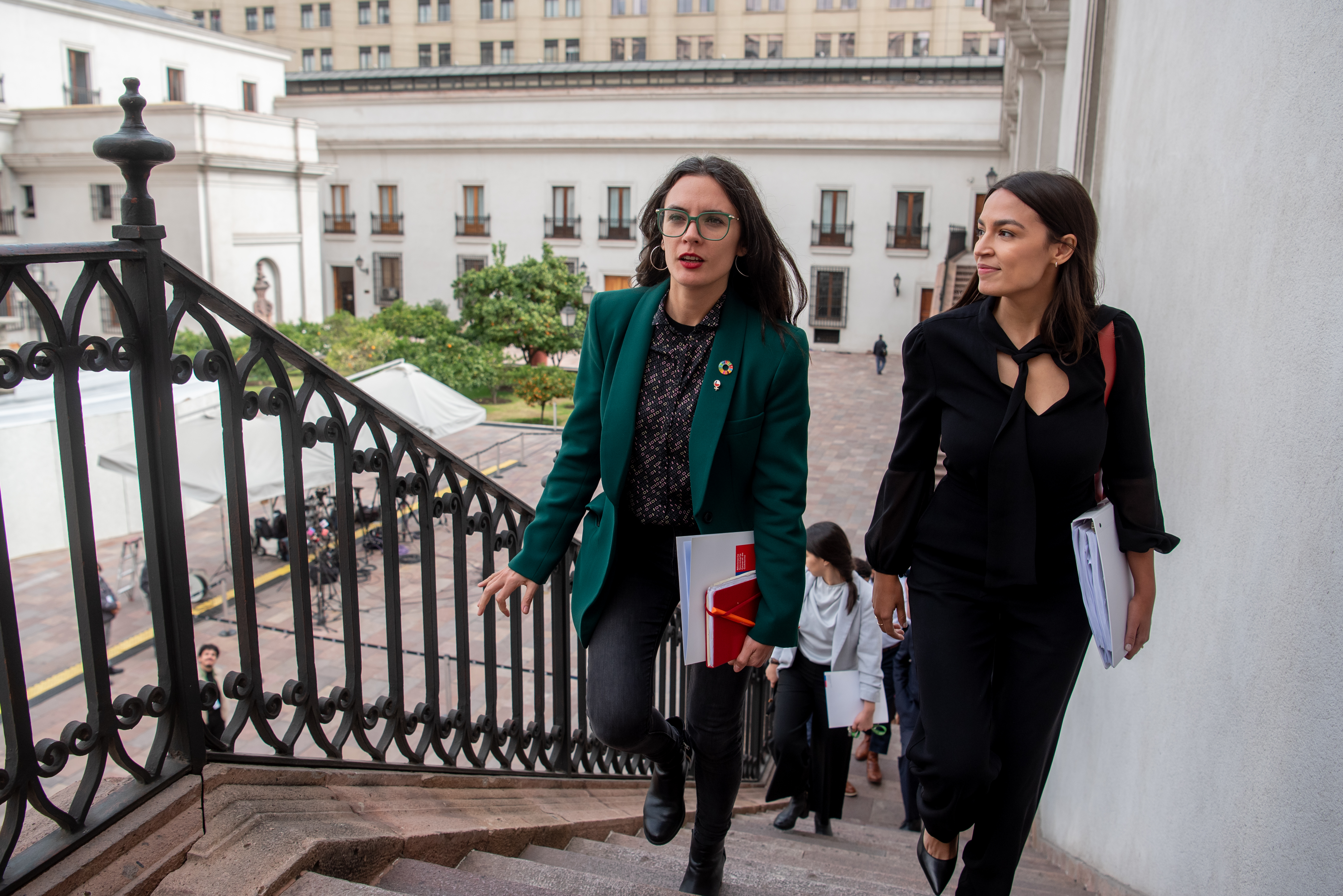
Ocasio-Cortez with Camila Vallejo in Chile in 2023

==== Abortion rights ====
Ocasio-Cortez supports codifying the right to abortion and is a member of the House Pro-Choice Caucus. On July 19, 2022, after the Supreme Court overruled Roe v. Wade in Dobbs v. Jackson Women's Health Organization, she and 17 other members of Congress were arrested in an act of civil disobedience for refusing to clear a street during a protest for reproductive rights outside the Supreme Court Building. Soon after, she appeared at a pro-choice rally in Union Square and recalled being raped in her early 20s and taking a pregnancy test shortly afterward and thinking "thank God I have at least a choice" while waiting for the result.

==== Education ====
Ocasio-Cortez campaigned in favor of establishing tuition-free public colleges and trade schools. She has said she is still paying off student loans herself and wants to cancel all student debt.

==== Immigration ====
Ocasio-Cortez has expressed support for defunding and abolishing the U.S. Immigration and Customs Enforcement (ICE) agency on multiple occasions. In February 2018 she called it "a product of the Bush-era Patriot Act suite of legislation" and "an enforcement agency that takes on more of a paramilitary tone every single day". That June, she said she would "stop short of fully disbanding the agency", and would rather "create a pathway to citizenship for more immigrants through decriminalization". She later clarified that this does not mean ceasing all deportations. Two days before the primary election, Ocasio-Cortez attended a protest at an ICE child-detention center in Tornillo, Texas. She was the only Democrat to vote against H.R. 648, a bill to fund and reopen the government, because it funded ICE.

In June 2019, Ocasio-Cortez compared the detention centers for undocumented immigrants under the Trump administration at the Mexico–United States border to "concentration camps". She cited "expert analysis", linking to an Esquire article quoting Andrea Pitzer, author of One Long Night: A Global History of Concentration Camps, who had made a similar claim. Some academics supported Ocasio-Cortez's use of the term for the forced detention of immigrants; others strongly criticized it, saying it showed disrespect for Holocaust victims. In response to criticism from both Republicans and Democrats, Ocasio-Cortez said they had conflated concentration camps ("the mass detention of civilians without trial") with death camps. She refused to apologize for using the term: "If that makes you uncomfortable, fight the camps, not the nomenclature."

In July 2019, Ocasio-Cortez visited migrant detention centers and other facilities in Texas as part of a congressional delegation to witness the border crisis firsthand. She called the conditions "horrifying". She said that women in one cell said they had not had access to showers for two weeks and were told to drink water from the toilet when their sink broke, and that one woman said that her daughters had been taken from her two weeks earlier and she did not know where they were.

In 2021, Ocasio-Cortez was an original cosponsor of the New Way Forward Act, which would overhaul federal immigration enforcement by eliminating mandatory detention, decriminalize unauthorized entry and reentry, narrow criminal grounds for deportation, and expand judicial discretion in removal proceedings. She also expressed support for Representative Pramila Jayapal's Roadmap to Freedom resolution to guide future immigration policy. The resolution aims to safeguard vulnerable migrants while reducing criminal prosecutions of migrants.

In February 2021, when the Biden administration reopened a Carrizo Springs, Texas, center to house unaccompanied migrant children, Ocasio-Cortez responded that such actions "never will be okay—no matter the administration or party". For short-term measures to address the situation, she called for mandatory licensing for such centers and urged reconsideration of how the centers are "contracted out".

==== LGBTQ rights ====
Ocasio-Cortez is a proponent of LGBTQ rights and equality. She has said she supports the community and thanked its members for their role in her campaign. At the January 2019 New York City Women's March in Manhattan, Ocasio-Cortez gave a detailed speech in support of measures needed to ensure LGBTQ equality in the workplace and elsewhere. She has also spoken in support of transgender rights, specifically saying, "Trans rights are civil rights are human rights." Later, she appeared on a video game live stream to help raise money for Mermaids, a UK-based charity for transgender children.

At the House Committee on Oversight and Reform on February 27, 2020, Ocasio-Cortez argued for LGBTQ equality in the context of her religious background. Referencing a Catholic hospital that refused a hysterectomy for a transgender man, she argued, "[t]here is nothing holy about rejecting medical care of people, no matter who they are, on the grounds of what their identity is. There is nothing holy about turning someone away from a hospital."

==== Police funding ====
When asked what America would look like if it defunded the police, she responded on Instagram:

It looks like a suburb. Affluent white communities already live in a world where they choose to fund youth, health, housing etc more than they fund police. When a teenager or preteen does something harmful in a suburb (I say teen bc this is often where lifelong carceral cycles begin for Black and Brown communities), White communities bend over backwards to find alternatives to incarceration for their loved ones to protect their future, like community service or rehab or restorative measures. Why don't we treat Black and Brown people the same way?

== Electoral history ==
=== 2018 ===
2018 New York's 14th congressional district election
Primary election
Party	Candidate	Votes	%
Democratic	Alexandria Ocasio-Cortez	16,898	56.7
Democratic	Joseph Crowley (incumbent)	12,880	43.3
Total votes		29,778	100.0
General election
Democratic	Alexandria Ocasio-Cortez	110,318	78.1
Republican	Anthony Pappas	19,202	13.6
Working Families	Joseph Crowley	8,075	5.7
Women's Equality	Joseph Crowley	1,273	0.9
Total	Joseph Crowley (incumbent)	9,348	6.6
Conservative	Elizabeth Perri	2,254	1.6
Write-in		82	0.1
Total votes		141,204	100.0
Democratic hold			

=== 2020 ===
2020 New York's 14th congressional district election
Primary election
Party	Candidate	Votes	%
Democratic	Alexandria Ocasio-Cortez (incumbent)	46,577	74.4
Democratic	Michelle Caruso-Cabrera	11,337	18.1
Democratic	Badrun Khan	3,119	5.0
Democratic	Sam Sloan	1,406	2.2
Write-in		143	0.2
Total votes		62,582	100.0
General election
Democratic	Alexandria Ocasio-Cortez (incumbent)	152,661	71.6
Republican	John Cummings	52,477	24.6
Conservative	John Cummings	5,963	2.8
Total	John Cummings	58,440	27.4
SAM	Michelle Caruso-Cabrera	2,000	0.9
Write-in		222	0.1
Total votes		213,323	100.0
Democratic hold			

=== 2022 ===
2022 New York's 14th congressional district election (Note: Ocasio-Cortez ran unopposed in her primary.)
Party	Candidate	Votes	%
Democratic	Alexandria Ocasio-Cortez	74,050	63.4
Working Families	Alexandria Ocasio-Cortez	8,403	7.2
Total	Alexandria Ocasio-Cortez (incumbent)	82,453	70.6
Republican	Tina Forte	31,935	27.3
Conservative	Desi Cuellar	2,208	1.9
Write-in		194	0.2
Total votes		116,790	100.0
Democratic hold			

=== 2024 ===
2024 New York's 14th congressional district election
Primary election
Party	Candidate	Votes	%
Democratic	Alexandria Ocasio-Cortez (incumbent)	20,136	82.2
Democratic	Martin Dolan	4,355	17.8
Total votes		24,491	100.0
General election
Democratic	Alexandria Ocasio-Cortez (incumbent)	123,269	68.9
Republican	Tina Forte	55,580	31.1
Total votes		178,849	100.0

=== 2026 ===
2026 New York's 14th congressional district election
Primary election
Party	Candidate	Votes	%
Democratic	Alexandria Ocasio-Cortez (incumbent)	31,202	86.9
Democratic	Felipe Garcia	2,429	6.8
Democratic	Marty Dolan	2.136	5.9
Total votes		35,767	100.0
General election
Democratic	Alexandria Ocasio-Cortez (incumbent)	0	0
Republican	Diamant Hysenaj	0	0
Total votes		0	100.0

== Awards and honors ==
The MIT Lincoln Laboratory named the asteroid 23238 Ocasio-Cortez after her when she was a senior in high school in recognition of her second-place finish in the 2007 Intel International Science and Engineering Fair. Ocasio-Cortez was named the 2017 National Hispanic Institute Person of the Year by Ernesto Nieto. In 2019, Ocasio-Cortez received the Adelle Foley Award. She was named one of the BBC 100 Women of 2019. In 2019, she co-wrote and narrated the short film A Message from the Future; it was nominated for an award at the 41st News and Documentary Emmy Awards.

In August 2026, Politico named Ocasio-Cortez one of the "biggest social media stars in Congress" alongside Louisiana senator John Kennedy, Vermont senator Bernie Sanders, Kentucky senator Rand Paul, and Texas representative Brandon Gill.

== Personal life ==
After the death of Ocasio-Cortez's father in 2008, her mother and grandmother moved to Florida due to financial hardship. She still has family in Puerto Rico, where her grandfather lived in a nursing home before dying in the aftermath of Hurricane Maria. Ocasio-Cortez has said that "to be Puerto Rican is to be the descendant of ... African Moors [and] slaves, Taino Indians, Spanish colonizers, Jewish refugees, and likely others. We are all of these things and something else all at once—we are Boricua." She has said that her family has Sephardic Jewish ancestry.

Ocasio-Cortez is a Catholic. She discussed her faith and its impact on her life and her campaign for criminal justice reform in a 2018 article she wrote for America, the magazine of the Jesuit order in the United States.

Ocasio-Cortez began dating Riley Roberts while they were both attending Boston University. They broke up after graduating, but later rekindled their relationship. Roberts moved to New York City to be with her and the couple lived in a one-bedroom apartment in Parkchester, the Bronx. In January 2020, they acquired a French Bulldog named Deco, after the Art Deco style. Ocasio-Cortez and Roberts became engaged in Puerto Rico in April 2022. The couple ended their engagement in 2024.

In May 2025, it was reported that Ocasio-Cortez lived in East Elmhurst, Queens. In August 2026, she announced that she intended to freeze her eggs and began documenting the process on Instagram to educate women about their reproductive options.

Based on her 2018 financial disclosure, OpenSecrets estimated that Ocasio-Cortez had a net worth of no more than $30,000, placing her among the least wealthy members of the 116th Congress.

In February 2021, Ocasio-Cortez said that earlier in her life she had been sexually assaulted. In 2022, she elaborated that, when she was 22 or 23, she had been raped by a man she was dating at the time and that the assault had been "pivotal" in leading her to run for office, though she did not realize that at the time. She said she did not report the assault to police and that the man later denied raping her when she confronted him about the incident.

In February 2021, Ocasio-Cortez recounted her experience of the January 6 United States Capitol attack in an Instagram Live broadcast. She called Republicans' statements about the attack the "tactics of abusers" and related them to her experience of sexual assault. In May 2021, she said that she had undergone psychotherapy after the attack, which she called "extraordinarily traumatizing", adding that she "did not know if I was going to make it to the end of that day alive".

Ocasio-Cortez is a fan of the New York Yankees.

== See also ==
- List of Democratic Socialists of America public officeholders
- List of Hispanic and Latino Americans in the United States Congress
- List of Latino Democrats
- Nuyorican – Puerto Ricans located in or around New York City
- Puerto Ricans in New York City
- Puerto Ricans in the United States
- Women in the United States House of Representatives

== Notes ==
U.S. House of Representatives
Preceded by Joe Crowley	Member of the US House of Representatives from New York's 14th congressional district 2019–present	Incumbent
Honorary titles
Preceded by Elise Stefanik	Baby of the House; 2019–2021	Succeeded by Madison Cawthorn
U.S. order of precedence (ceremonial)
Preceded by Joe Neguse	United States representatives by seniority 217th	Succeeded by Ilhan Omar
